= Lalgudi taluk =

Lalgudi
- taluk
- Location within Tamil Nadu
- Coordinates: 10.87°N 78.83°E
- country: India
- state: Tamil Nadu
- Region: Chola Nadu
- zone: Central
- District: Tiruchirappalli district
- division: Lalgudi

language
  - Official: Tamil
- Time zone: UTC+5.30 (IST)
- PIN: 621 601
- Telephone code: 0431
- ISO 3166 code: IN-TN
- Vehicle registration: TN-48

Lalgudi taluk is an administrative area of Tiruchirapalli district of the Indian state of Tamil Nadu. The headquarters of the taluk is the town of Lalgudi. The taluk of Lalgudi was formed 100 years ago by the British East India Company. Lalgudi taluk consists of two revenue blocks named Pullambadi block and Lalgudi block.

== Transport ==
The taluk is well connected by roadways as well as railways. NH227 runs longitudinally across the taluk. Government and private buses connect the villages with taluk and district headquarters, and the major towns and cities of central Tamil Nadu. Lalgudi, Pullambadi, Dalmiapuram and Valadi are the major railway stations. The nearest airport is the Tiruchirapalli International Airport, And nearest Railway Junction is the Tiruchirapalli Junction.

== Urban areas ==
1. Lalgudi
2. Pullambadi
3. Dalmiapuram
4. Poovalur

== Number of revenue villages ==
The taluk hosts 78 villages. 45 are under the revenue block of Lalgudi. The remaining 33 villages are under the revenue block of Pullambadi.

== Rivers ==
Kollidam, Peruvalai, Iyan, Panguni, and Pullambadi are the important channels which traverse the taluk.

== Demographics ==
Religions in Lalgudi taluk (2011)
Religion	Percent
Hinduism	78.39%
Christianity	18.19%
Islam	3.31%
Other or not stated	0.11%

According to the 2011 census, Lalgudi had a population of 254,705 with 124,855 males and 129,850 females. 23.24% of the population lived in urban areas. Scheduled Castes made up 20.95% of the population. Lalgudi taluk had a sex ratio of 1038 females per 1000 males and a literacy rate of 75.56%. The under-6 age group held 11,821 Males and 11,296 Females.
