= Anbil, Tamil Nadu =

Panchayat village in Tamil Nadu, India

Anbil
- Panchayat village
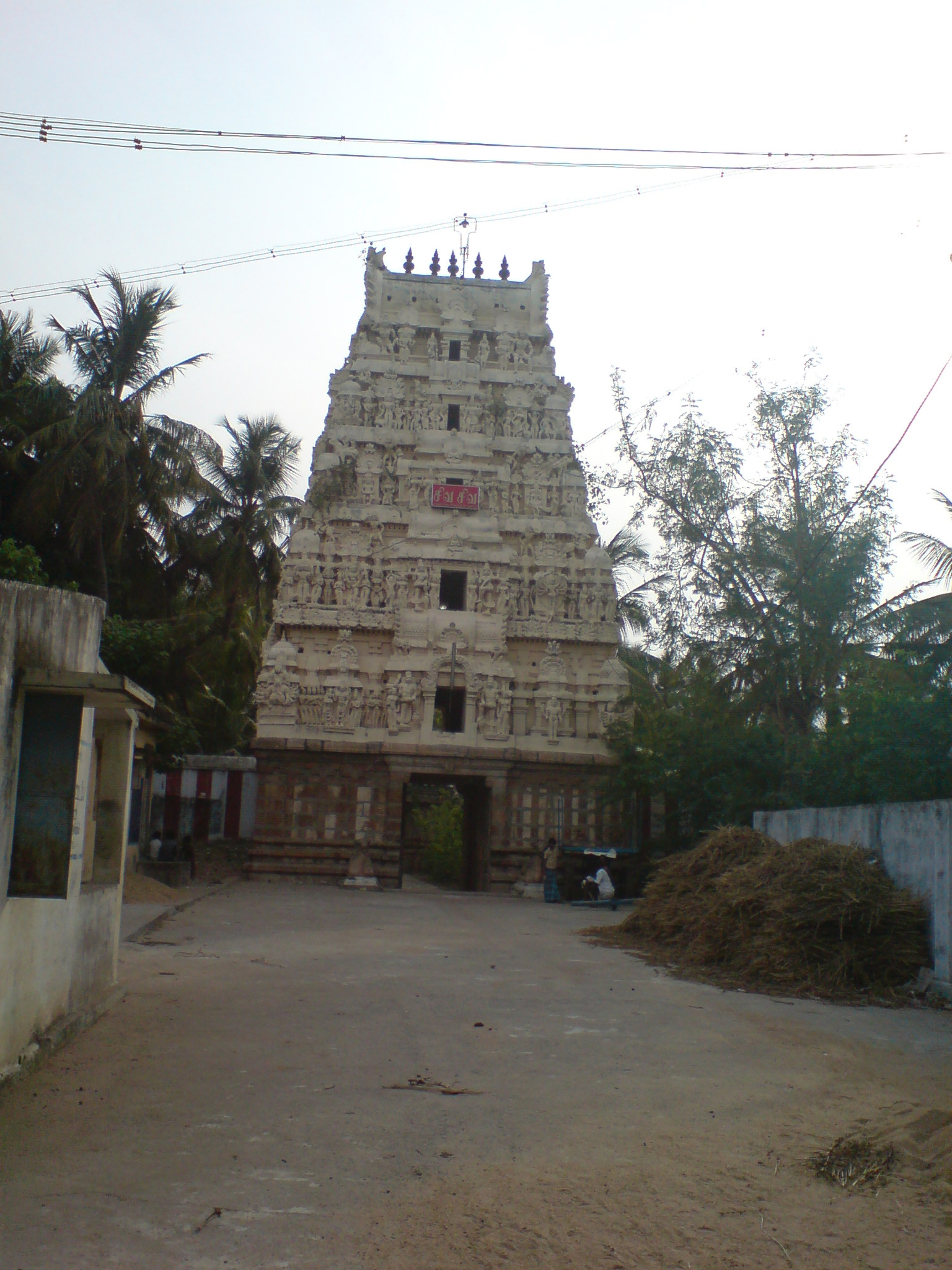
- Anbilanthurai temple

- Location in Tamil Nadu, India Anbil (India)
- Coordinates: 11.27°N 78.52°E
- Country: India
- State: Tamil Nadu
- District: Tiruchirappalli
- Taluk: Lalgudi
- Division: Lalgudi

Government
  - Type: Local government of Tamil Nadu
- Elevation: 194 m (636 ft)

Population (2011)
  - Total: 8,113

Languages
  - Official: Tamil
- Time zone: UTC+5:30 (IST)
- Postal code: 621703
- Website: Anbil Panchayat

Anbil is a village in India's Tiruchirappalli district, close to Lalgudi, and situated on the banks of the Kollidam River.

Anbil is known for its temples. These include the Sundararaja Perumal Temple (also called the Vadivalagiya Nambi Perumal Temple), which is dedicated to the Hindu god Vishnu; also the Anbil Mariamman Kovil temple, dedicated to the South Indian mother goddess Mariamman. The latter temple also holds a popular annual car festival.

Anbil is the birthplace of many prominent figures in Tamil Nadu politics, including Anbil P. Dharmalingam, one of the founding members of the DMK Political Party and previous Cabinet Minister in the Tamil Nadu government.

== Temples ==
The Sundararaja Perumal temple was constructed in the Dravidian style of architecture and is mentioned in the Nalayira Divya Prabandham, the religious canon of the Alvar saints of the 7th–9th centuries CE. The temple priests, who belong to the Vaishnava community, perform the pooja (rituals) daily and during festivals. The Theerthavari festival celebrated in the Tamil month of Masi (February–March), and Vaikuntha Ekadashi celebrated during the Tamil month of Margali (December–January), are the major festivals celebrated in the temple. The Sundararaja Perumal temple is one of the 108 Divya Desam temples dedicated to Vishnu.

The Anbil Alanthurai temple is dedicated to Shiva, Alanthuraiar and Soundaranayagi. The architecture is of the Chola period (Parantaka Chola). Here the form of Vinayagar is called "Sevi saitha Vinayagar." It is one of the 275 Paadal Petra Sthalam. This place was referred to in Tevaram, written by the saint-poets (7th century) Thirugnana Sambandhar and Appar.

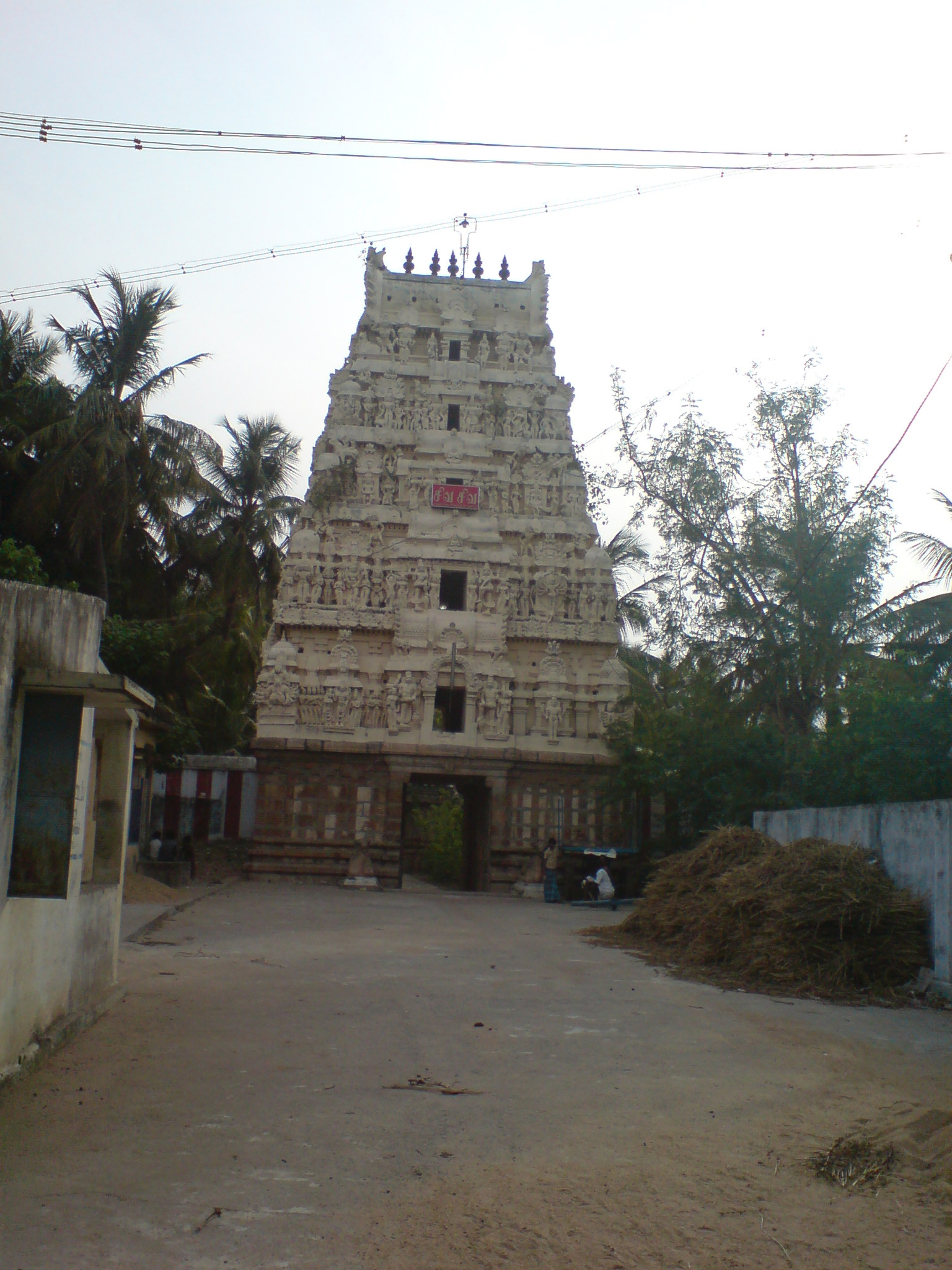
Anbil Alanthurai Temple

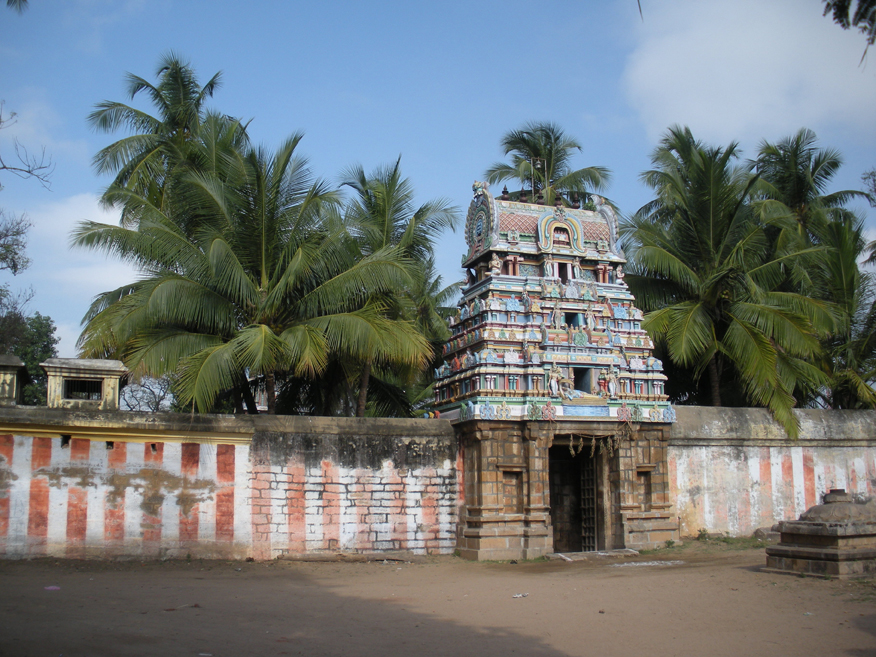
Sundararaja Perumal Temple

== Agriculture ==
The economy of the village is predominantly agrarian. There has been a scarcity of labor for harvesting, but this has been addressed by use of mechanical harvesting. The main crops cultivated are sugarcane and paddy.
