= Anbil Sathyavaheesvarar Temple =

Shiva temple in Thanjavur district, Tamil Nadu, India

- Anbil Sivan Temple
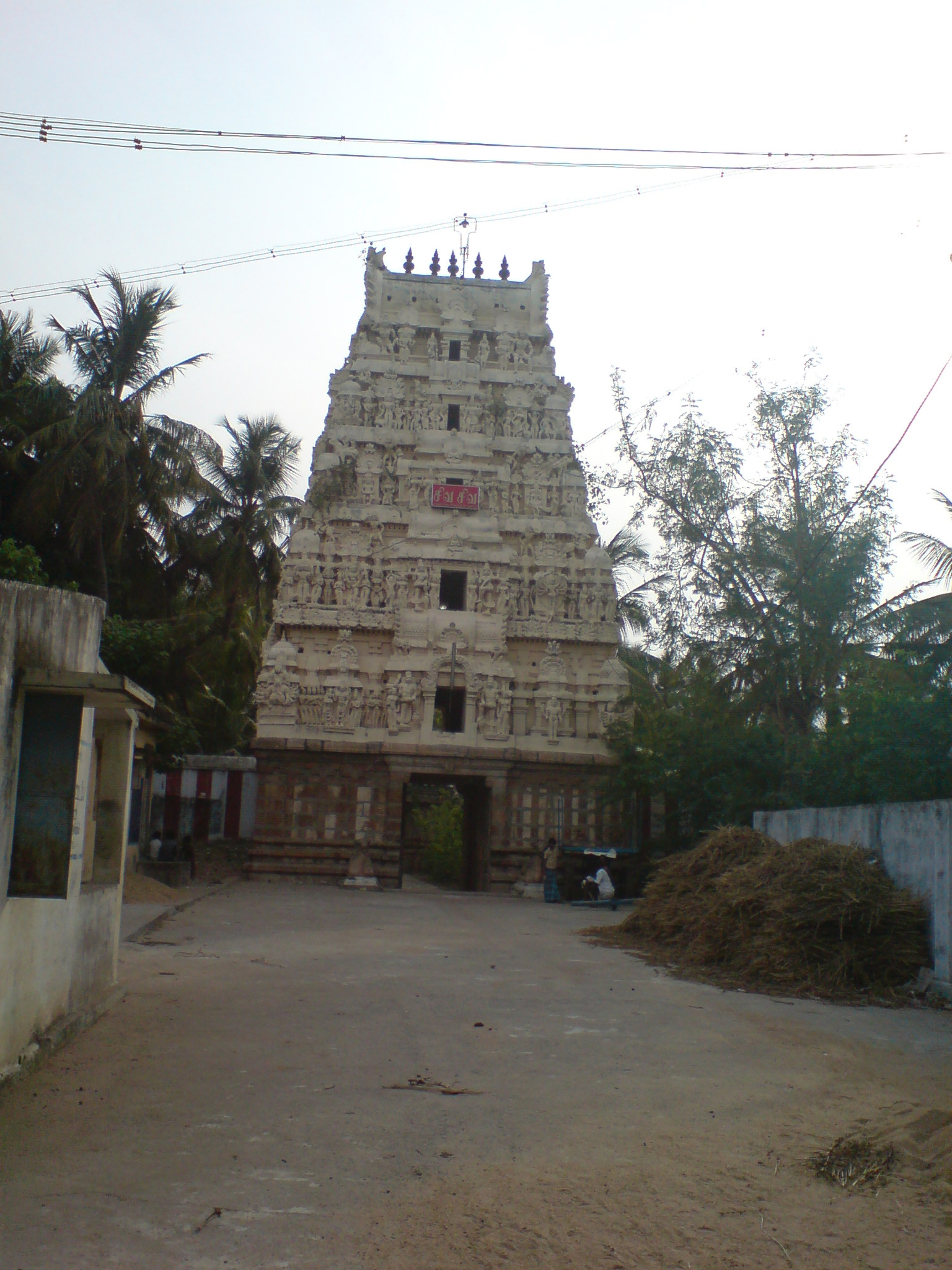

- Location in Tamil Nadu

Religion
- Affiliation: Hinduism
- District: Trichy
- Deity: Sathyavageesar, Alanthuraiar(Shiva) Soundranayagi
- Features: Temple tank: Chandra Theertham

Location
- Location: Anbil
- State: Tamil Nadu
- Country: India
- Coordinates: 10°51′0″N 78°52′0″E

Architecture
- Type: Dravidian architecture

Anbil Alanthurai Temple (also called Sathyavaheeswarar temple) is a temple dedicated to Shiva, located on the banks of the Kollidam river in Anbil, a small village near Lalgudi. is a Hindu temple dedicated to Shiva located in the village of Tiruchotruthurai, Tamil Nadu, India. Shiva is worshiped as Sathyavaheeswarar, and is represented by the lingam and his consort Parvati is depicted as Soundaranayagi. The presiding deity is revered in the 7th century Tamil Saiva canonical work, the Tevaram, written by Tamil poet saints known as the nayanars and classified as Paadal Petra Sthalam.

There are many inscriptions associated with the temple indicating contributions from Cholas, Thanjavur Nayaks and Thanjavur Maratha kingdom. The oldest parts of the present masonry structure were built during the Chola dynasty in the 9th century, while later expansions, are attributed to later periods, up to the Thanjavur Nayaks during the 16th century.

The temple house a five-tiered gateway tower known as gopurams. The temple has numerous shrines, with those of Sathyavaheeswarar and Soundaranayagi being the most prominent. The temple complex houses many halls and three precincts. The temple has four daily rituals at various times from 6:30 a.m. to 8 p.m., and five yearly festivals on its calendar. The temple is now maintained and administered by Hindu Religious and Charitable Endowments Department of the Government of Tamil Nadu.

== Legend ==
As per Hindu legend, the Vinayagar, Ganesa, is called "Sevi Saitha Vinayagar" and is believed to have lent his ears (sevi) for the songs of Sambandar. Sambandar was the divine child who was fed by Parvathi in Sirkali. He started singing praise of Shiva and visited various temples along the banks of river Kaveri. On reaching this place, he saw the temple on the other bank. Shiva wanted to test him and created a flood in the river. The child could not cross the river Kollidam due to flooding and started singing praise from the other side. Vinayaga, the sone of Shiva, was very much pleased, bent his knees and started listening to the songs. Following the legend, there is a structural representation of Sevisaitha Vinayagar indicating the legend. The place was also inhabited by Brahmins who used to recite Sama Veda every day. The Vinayagar of the temple is also called "Samaganam ketta Vinayagar" as the one who listened to the recital of the Veda. Following the legend, the temple is surrounded by Brahmins till date who recite Sama Veda every day.

== History ==
Anbil is a village in the Trichy district, which has many Chola temples, including Varadharaja Perumal temple, Siva temple, Mariyamman temple, and Aachi raama valli amman temple. The temple has many inscriptions recorded as a part of 1902 and 1938. There are 13 inscriptions from 1902 recorded as 595 to 601 and six of 1938. Out of the totals, seven were recorded from the Sundararaja Perumal temple. Parantaka Chola I is believed to have built the temple. The inscriptions mention the presiding deity as Brahmapureeswarar. The inscriptions are from various kings like Maravarman Kulasekara Pandyan I, Rajendra Chola III, Hoysala Veeramadevar, Parakesarivarman and Rajarajadevan. The temple is now maintained and administered by Hindu Religious and Charitable Endowments Department of the Government of Tamil Nadu.

== Architecture ==
The temple is located in Anbil, a village in Thanjavur district in the Indian state of Tamil Nadu. It is situated on the northern banks of the river Kollidam, 15 km from Trichy, and 3 km from Lalgudi on the Trichy - Thirumazhapadi road. The temple has three prakarams (closed precincts of a temple) and many mandapams (halls). The temple faces east and is entered via a five-tiered pyramidal rajagopuram (gateway tower). The presiding deity in the form of lingam is housed in the sanctum in square shape. The attached hall, the ardhamandapa measures the same width as the sanctum, while its length is twice the sanctum. The ardhamandapa projects towards the east. The Mukhamandapa has a square structure. There are five devakoshtas that cover the exterior walls of the sanctum. The images of Dakshinamurthy and Brahma are the only ones remaining out of the five. There are two large Dvarapala, guardian deities on either side of the entrance of the ardhamandapa. The water bodies associated with the temple are Gayathri Theertham and Kollidam. There is a unique sculpture on one of the pillars showing a snake head emanating from one end and its tail on the other side of the pillar. There is a separate shrine for Brahma in the temple.

== Status ==
Tirugnana Sambandar and Appar, the 7th-century Tamil Saivite poets, venerated Sathyavaheeswarar in Tevaram, compiled in the Tirumurai. The temple is classified as Paadal Petra Sthalam, one of the 275 temples mentioned in the Saiva canon.
