= Mayiladuthurai Sarangapani =

- Born: Mayavaram Sarangapani; 1947; Mudikondan, Mayiladuthurai, Tamil Nadu, India
- Died: 15 March 1965 (aged 18); A.V.C. College, Mayiladuthurai, Tamil Nadu, India
- Cause of death: Burns from self-immolation
- Occupations: Student, Tamil activist
- Known for: Self-immolation for the Anti-Hindi agitations movement

Mayiladuthurai Sarangapani (1947–1965), also known as Mayavaram Sarangapani, was a student and participant in the anti-Hindi agitations who died by self-immolation during the anti-Hindi agitations in 1965, amid protests over the implementation of Hindi as the sole official language under the Official Languages Act, 1963, enacted by the Union Government of India.

== Background ==
=== Agitation of 1937–1940 ===
The anti-Hindi agitations in Tamil Nadu involve several mass protests, riots, student and political movements in Tamil Nadu concerning the official status of Hindi in the state. The first anti-Hindi agitation was launched in 1937 after the Indian National Congress (INC) won the 1937 elections in Madras Province. The INC government was led by C. Rajagopalachari (Rajaji). On 11 August 1937, within a month of coming to power, he announced his intention to introduce Hindi language teaching in secondary schools by issuing a policy statement. This move was immediately opposed by E. V. Ramasamy (Periyar) and the opposition Justice Party (later Dravidar Kazhagam).

The agitation, which lasted for about 30 months, was multifaceted and involved fasts, conferences, marches, picketing and protests. The government responded with a crackdown resulting in the death of two protesters and the arrest of 1,198 persons including women and children. Mandatory Hindi education was later withdrawn by the British governor of Madras Lord Erskine, in February 1940 after the resignation of the Congress government in 1939.

=== Agitation of 1965 ===
After India's independence in 1947, the new Constitution, which came into effect on 26 January 1950, provided that Hindi would become the sole official language of the Union government after 26 January 1965. The Dravida Munnetra Kazhagam (DMK), which split from the Dravidar Kazhagam in 1949, inherited the anti-Hindi policies of its parent organisation. DMK founder C.N. Annadurai had earlier participated in the anti-Hindi imposition agitations of 1938–40 and again in the 1940s.

In July 1953, the DMK launched the Kallakudi demonstration to protest the renaming of the town of Kallakudi as Dalmiapuram. The party argued that the new name, derived from industrialist Ramkrishna Dalmia, symbolised North Indian exploitation of South India.

As 26 January 1965 approached, the anti-Hindi agitation in Madras State intensified in both scale and urgency. In January 1965, the Tamil Nadu Students' Anti-Hindi Agitation Council was formed as an umbrella student organisation to coordinate the protests. Several student conferences were held across the state to oppose the imposition of Hindi.

On 16 January, Annadurai announced that 26 January (India's Republic Day) would be observed as a day of mourning. On 25 January, a clash between protesting students and Congress Party workers in Madurai escalated into a riot. The violence quickly spread to other parts of the state.

The police responded with lathi charges and opened fire on student processions. During the two weeks of unrest, around 70 people were killed according to official estimates, while some unofficial reports placed the death toll as high as 500. A large number of students were arrested, and property damage was estimated at ten million rupees.

=== Mayiladuthurai agitation ===
Sarangapani was a second-year B.Com student at A.V.C. College in Mayiladuthurai (formerly known as Mayavaram). He came from a farming family in the village of Mudikondan, which is located on the state highway between Mayiladuthurai and Thiruvarur.

Sarangapani and his friends were concerned about the violence in Madurai involving members of the INC and the subsequent police action, including reported attacks and firing on students. In March 1965, he and his friends went to the Government Girls' School on Pattamangalam Street in Mayiladuthurai, where classes were in session, and urged the students to boycott classes and participate in the anti-Hindi protest.

== Self-immolation ==
On 15 March 1965, in the early morning on the campus of A.V.C. College, Sarangapani set himself on fire while shouting, "Tamil Vazhga! Hindi Ozhiga!" (loosely translated as "Long live Tamil! Down with Hindi!"). The act was described as a form of protest against the Indian National Congress (INC) Union Government's language policies promoting Hindi, as well as against reported police action against students and the deployment of paramilitary forces in parts of Madras State.

On the same day, he was transported to Thanjavur Medical College Hospital for specialized treatment for his burn injuries. Despite medical efforts, he later succumbed to his injuries.

== Honors and recognition ==
In recognition of his sacrifice, a statue of Sarangapani was erected on the campus of A.V.C. College, Mayiladuthurai. Additionally, a railway bridge in the town has been named after him.
