= M. Gopala Krishna Iyer =

M.Gopala Krishna Iyer Panditha
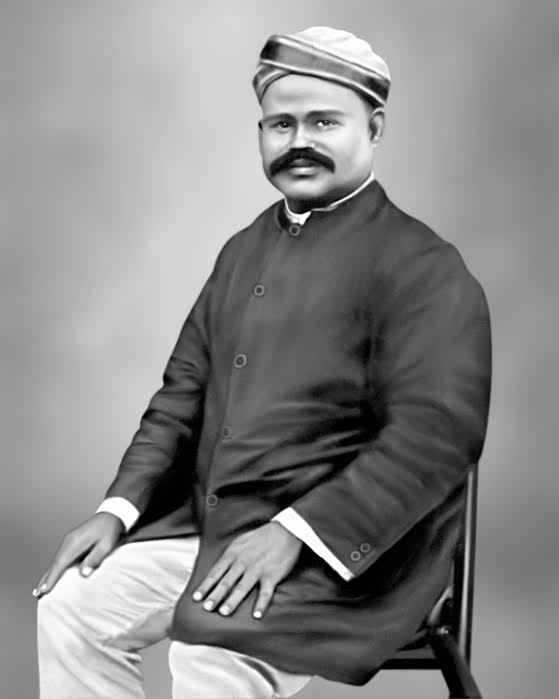

M. Gopala Krishna Iyer (1878–1927), known by the pen name Ma.Ko., was a Tamil-language poet, translator, essayist, playwright and educator. He taught Tamil at Madura College and later headed the Tamil department at National College, Tiruchirappalli. He edited the literary journals Vivekodayam and Nachinarkkiniyan and produced Tamil translations of English poetry for use by students.

== Early life ==
Gopala Krishna Iyer was born in 1878 in the village of Lalgudi, then in Tiruchirapalli district. His father, Mahadeva Iyer, worked as a shirastedar (head clerk) at the Madurai sub-court; his mother, Pravartha Srimathi, taught him and his siblings stories from the Indian epics and the Puranas. He had two elder brothers, Jagadeesan and Paramasivam; a younger brother, Duraiswamy; and two younger sisters, Chellameenakshi and Parvatham.

After passing the FA examination, he studied Tamil under the scholar Cholavandan Arasan Shanmukanar. His writings began appearing in Tamil journals from 1896, when he was eighteen.

In 1897, at the age of nineteen, he accompanied Bhaskara Sethupathi, the ruler of Ramnad, to Pamban to receive Swami Vivekananda on his return to India from the United States. Vivekananda had composed a thirteen stanza poem, The Song of the Sannyasin, at Thousand Island Park, New York, in July 1895; Gopala Krishna Iyer later produced a Tamil translation of the set. Iyer also served as the secretary of the Vivekananda Union, Madurai.

Gopala Krishna Iyer married Dharmambal, daughter of Annasami Iyer. They had four daughters — Perunthiru, Annapurani, Savitri and Gomathi — and two sons, Sidhamoorthy and Krishnamoorthy.

== Career ==
Gopala Krishna Iyer taught Tamil at Madura College (then known as Madura Native High School) for more than a decade.

On 5 May 1901, at the age of twenty-three, he founded the Madurai Manavar Senthamizh Sangam to promote the study of Tamil among students; he later said that Madurai, as a centre of Tamil learning, lacked a dedicated sangam and that he founded the organisation to fill that gap. This preceded the founding of the Madurai Tamil Sangam by Pandithurai Thevar, which was inaugurated on 14 September 1901; Gopala Krishna Iyer, a friend of Pandithurai, later served as an examiner and governing-body member of that sangam as well. Scholars and philanthropists associated with his own Manavar Sangam included U. Ve. Saminatha Iyer, Pethachi Chettiyar, Ragunatha Rajaliar, V. Krishnasamy Iyer and Pandithurai Thevar.

He also founded a library named after the mediaeval Tamil scholar Naccinarkkiniyar. Subramania Bharati was a regular visitor to the library, and the two men became friends through it. In 1904, after Bharati left his position in Ettayapuram, Gopala Krishna Iyer helped him secure a post at Sethupathi High School. Separately, when Sudesamitran editor G. Subramania Iyer visited Madurai looking for a sub-editor, Gopala Krishna Iyer recommended Bharati for the post; Subramania Iyer subsequently invited Bharati to Chennai to join the paper.

In 1907 Ma.Ko attended the Surat Congress session and wrote an account of the split in the Indian National Congress for the Madurai-based journal Vivekabhanu; the piece, titled "Congress Mahasabai", is described as the first published Tamil-language report on the session. He supported Bal Gangadhar Tilak and Aurobindo Ghosh, as did Bharati and V. O. Chidambaram Pillai, who both attended the December 1907 Surat Session.

When Rabindranath Tagore visited Madurai in early 1919, Gopala Krishna Iyer presented him with a poem of felicitation at a gathering of Tamil scholars.

In 1919 he was invited to head the Tamil department at National College, Tiruchirappalli, and moved there from Madurai, holding the post until his death. His students won gold medals for standing first in the Madras Presidency, and he translated into Tamil the English poems prescribed in his students' syllabus, publishing them in his journal alongside editorials and poems on patriotic themes.

== Literary works ==
=== Translations ===
Gopala Krishna Iyer translated English poetry into Tamil, selecting more than forty pieces spanning four centuries of English verse, from Shakespeare to Tennyson, for the benefit of Tamil-speaking students. Among his translations is a rendering of the "Seven Ages of Man" speech from As You Like It. Describing the schoolboy, Shakespeare writes:

Then the whining schoolboy with his satchel
And the shining morning face, creeping like a snail
Unwillingly to school.

Gopala Krishna Iyer's translation reads:

தூண்டா நிற்ப, வேண்டா வெறுப்பொடு
புத்தகப் பையொடு நத்தைபோல் ஊர்ந்து
மினுங்கிய வதனம் சிணுங்கிச் சிணுங்கிக்
காலைப் பொழுதிற் கல்விக் கழகம்
மெள்ளச் செல்லும் பள்ளிப் பிள்ளை

His translation work was noted by the missionary-scholar Rev. G. U. Pope and, according to a family-published account, by Bharati and by the Tamil scholar U. V. Swaminatha Iyer.

In 1915 he compiled his poems, translations and essays into a single volume, Arumporuttirattu, sponsored by the philanthropist Pethachi Chettiyar and published by the Madurai Tamil Sangam. It includes felicitatory and elegiac poems written for public figures such as Tagore, U. V. Saminatha Iyer, Parithimal Kalaignar and Pandithurai Thevar, poems on social themes including women's education, and biographical sketches of Greek philosophers such as Socrates and Plato.

=== Filial Duty (புதல்வர் கடமை) ===
Filial Duty, prescribed by the textbook committee in the 1920s, recounts the lives of forty historical and literary figures noted for devotion to their parents, drawing on the Ramayana and Mahabharata as well as figures from European history and literature such as Alexander the Great, Quintus Cicero and Samuel Johnson. Filial Duty and the play Visvanathan (see below) were both prescribed texts for the TLSC public examination from 1921 to 1926. According to the article as previously written, S. N. Kandasami of the Centre for Higher Research – World Classical Languages at Tamil University, Thanjavur, said the book would help younger readers develop stronger values; this attribution is currently unsourced and should be verified.

=== Plays ===
Gopala Krishna Iyer wrote two plays. Visvanathan (விஸ்வநாதன்), also referred to as Kadamai Muran, staged at the anniversary celebrations of several Tamil sangams including the Madurai Tamil Sangam, depicts the historical figure Visvanatha Nayakkan caught between conflicting duties, across six acts. Mouna Desikar, an eight-act comedy, concerns a Pandya king who claims to employ a sign-language expert in order to save face before a rival kingdom's envoy.

=== Essays ===
Gopala Krishna Iyer wrote essays collected under several themes, including science, health, history, ethics, patriotism and education.

=== Commentary on Valluvar Nerisai ===
Gopala Krishna Iyer's teacher, Arasan Shanmuganar, had written Valluvar Nerisai, pairing each kural of the Tirukkural with a short story from the Indian epics and puranas. After Shanmuganar's death, his family gave Gopala Krishna Iyer the manuscript; he wrote a commentary and published it serially in Vivekodayam. The first hundred kurals were published as a standalone volume in 1919, with a foreword by V. Muthusami Iyer, personal assistant to the Inspector of Schools. He continued the commentary in Nachinarkkinian from 1923, stating his intention to compile the next hundred kurals, but did not complete this before his death.

== Journalism ==
In 1909, Gopala Krishna Iyer and the poet Kandasami Kavirayar launched a journal, Vidyabhanu. In 1916, under the auspices of the Madurai Manavar Senthamizh Sangam, he started a second journal, Vivekodayam, which published his own editorials alongside contributions from Tamil scholars, articles on physics and chemistry, translations, poetry, and commentary on government language policy. After his move to Tiruchirappalli in 1919, he founded a third journal, Nachinarkkiniyan, at his students' request; it carried similar content.

== Advocacy for women's education ==
Gopala Krishna Iyer wrote and campaigned on women's education. When he launched Vivekodayam in 1916 he offered women a subscription discount and appointed his cousin, V. Balammal, as assistant editor. That year, following a government notice requesting state-level recommendations on women's education by 12 September 1916, Vivekodayam argued that state governments should consult women's forums directly before finalising their recommendations. He invited women speakers — including Pandithai Asalambikai Ammayar (1875-1955), a Tamil scholar and orator whose poems and essays appeared in periodicals, as well as Krishnaveni and Padmavathi — to address the Manavar Sangam, and published poems in their honour in the journal. When a memorial fund was proposed for Sudesamitran editor Subramania Iyer, the journal proposed that half the fund go toward improving women's status; Balammal separately proposed vocational centres to support women's economic independence.

Several essays and poems in his 1915 collection Arumporuttirattu address women's education, including the essay மதனலீலையார், in which he addresses women as his "sisters" and argues that timidity is not a virtue. One of his poems on the subject, Pen Kalvipperu (பெண் கல்விப்பேறு), is reproduced below:

நாற்பொருளும் நாம்பெற்றேம்: நன்மக்கட் பேறுற்றேம்:
நாற்குணத்தேம் நாமகளின் நல்லருளால் – நாற்றிசையீர்!
மண்கல் விலங்காதி மானஇரேம்: பெற்றேமால்
பெண்கல்வி என்னுமொரு பேறு.

He is described in family-published sources as having valued daughters as highly as sons, and as having celebrated the birth of his own first daughter at a time when many families favoured a male firstborn.

In 1914, in the aftermath of the widely publicised suicide of Snehalata Mukhopadhyay in Calcutta, Gopala Krishna Iyer wrote an article opposing dowry for the journal Poorna Chandrodayam, urging young men to recognise its harms and to help spread awareness against the practice.

== Advocacy for Tamil language and education ==
Gopala Krishna Iyer argued for Tamil as a medium of instruction in science education. He recalled a conversation with a Bengali scholar, Pandavanatha Simham, who attributed Bengal's high rate of postgraduate qualification to students being able to study physics, chemistry and mathematics without first needing English. In a speech at a training school in Dindigul, he argued that Indian students spent years mastering English before they could properly grasp science that an English-speaking child learned far younger, and called on scholars to translate scientific works into Tamil so that Tamil-speaking students would not lose years of their education to language acquisition.

He himself wrote essays on science topics for Tamil students, drawing on English-language science journals and books, and translated English poems using a range of Tamil metres (சந்தம்); Bharati is said to have admired this work.

M. Gopala Krishna Iyer was the first head of the Tamil dept. An adept in translating into Tamil, poems from English without missing their original beauty, he improved the standards of education in Tamil language and literature even at the time when prominence was given only to English. We remember him today for elevating the status of Tamil even then.

— Golden Jubilee Souvenir. National College, Tiruchirappalli. 1959.

In an essay on Tamil's development, he set out reasons for the language's diminished status and suggested ways to elevate it. In an elegy for Parithimarkalaignar, who died in November 1903 and who in 1902 became the first person to petition for Tamil to be recognised as a classical language, predicted that Tamil would in future be recognised as a "Classical Language."

He criticised Tamils who took pride in not knowing their own language, arguing that such people mistakenly believed their command of English would be admired in proportion to their ignorance of Tamil. At the same time, he did not blame the English language or English people for this attitude, reserving his criticism for Tamils who had the means and standing to support the language's development but failed to do so.

His two journals carried reports on the activities of various Tamil sangams, including the Madurai Tamil Sangam, alongside essays on physics and chemistry in Tamil, translations of poems from other languages, and commentary on government and university language policy.

== Death and legacy ==
In 1927, as Meenakshi College was preparing to become Annamalai University, Gopala Krishna Iyer received an invitation to join its faculty, which he accepted, planning to begin in June 1927. He fell ill and died in April 1927 before taking up the post. Anticipating his death, he announced in March 1927, as editor of Nachinarkkiniyan, that subscribers who had paid in advance could take his books in place of a refund if the journal ceased publication.

He was admired by contemporaries for his sustained efforts toward the development of Tamil. An elegy for him written by Lakshmi Narasimha Iyer appears in Tamil Pulavar Agara Varisai:

எக்காலும் முயற்சியோடு மேதாவ
தொன்றுரைத்தோ எழுதி யேயோ
தொக்கார்கண் டுவந்திடநின் னுடல்பொருளா
வியாம்மூன்றும் சோர்வில் லாமல்
மிக்காரும் தமிழ்மொழிக்கே விழைந்துதவும்
மேன்மையினை விதியி லாதேன்
எக்காலம் கண்டிடுவேன் கோபால
கிருட்டிணனே எங்கு சென்றாய்?
