= Lalgudi division =

- Revenue Division
- country: India
- state: Tamil Nadu
- District: Tiruchirappalli
- region: chola Nadu
- Zone: Central

Languages
  - Official: Tamil
- Time zone: UTC+5.30
  - Summer (DST): IST
- PIN: 620 xxx
- Telephone: 0431
- ISO 3166 code: [[ISO 3166-3:IN|]]
- Vehicle registration: TN-48

Location of Lalgudi division headquarters

Lalgudi division is a revenue division in the Tiruchirapalli district of Tamil Nadu, India. It comprises the taluks of Manachanallur and Lalgudi. Town of lalgudi is the headquarters of lalgudi revenue division. It is the one of three revenue divisions in the district of Tiruchirapalli.

== Urbans in the division ==
1. lalgudi,
2. manachanallur,
3. dalmiapuram,
4. pullambadi,
5. samayapuram,
6. Tolgate.
