= Lalgudi block =

- Union
- Country: India
- state: Tamil Nadu
- Region: Chola Nadu
- Zone: Central
- District: Tiruchirapalli district
- Division: Lalgudi division
- Taluk: Lalgudi taluk

Lalgudi block is a revenue block in the Tiruchirappalli district of Tamil Nadu, India. It has a total of 45 panchayat villages. Lalgudi block is one of the two revenue blocks in the taluk of Lalgudi, the other one is Pullambadi revenue block. Lalgudi union office is in the small town of Puvallur just 2 km from Lalgudi. Most area of this block are fertile wet lands. very few areas are dry lands. Kothari sugars and chemicals pvt ltd. Kattur is present in this block.
