= Raghunath Vinayak Dhulekar =

Indian politician

Pandit Raghunath Vinayak Dhulekar
- Born: 6 January 1891; Jhansi, United Province, British India
- Died: Jhansi, Uttar Pradesh, India
- Citizenship: Indian
- Occupations: pleader, Social Leader; Freedom fighter Political activist
- Organization: Indian National Congress
- Movement: Indian Independence Movement

Pandit Raghunath Vinayak Dhulekar (6 January 1891 – 1980) was a prominent Indian freedom fighter, notable pleader & a social leader from Jhansi, Uttar Pradesh who took an active part in the Indian National Movement and Salt March and held many responsible positions in Indian politics including Member of the Parliament of India and Constituent Assembly in 1952.

== Early life ==
He was born on 6 January 1891 in Jhansi, Uttar Pradesh in a Marathi speaking family; and married Janki Bai on 10 May 1912. He graduated from Calcutta University with a Bachelor of Arts degree in English in 1914. In 1916, he graduated from Allahabad University with a Master of Arts and Bachelor of Laws. He later set up his practice at District Court Jhansi.

== Amendment in constitution for Hindi language ==
In December 1946, he produced an amendment bill before parliament to work and speak in parliament in Hindi and then translated in English language for all parliamentary members. On 10 December 1946 he delivered his first major speech in Hindustani. In his speech he said that people who do not know Hindustani have no right to stay in India. People who are present in this House to fashion out a constitution for India and do not know Hindustani are not worthy to be members of this Assembly. They better leave. He was declared out of order but returned to the seat after a request from Jawaharlal Nehru.

== Career ==
Pandit Raghunath Dhulekar was a practicing pleader prominent in civil and revenue matters at the District court, Jhansi and later in the Divisional Court, Jhansi. Babu Narayan Das Shrivastava, notable pleader and a social leader of Bundelkhand region was his associate during his early days at District Court, Jhansi.

From 1920 to 1925, he published the Hindi newspapers Swaraja Prapti and Free India. As a result of his involvement with the India freedom movement, Dhulekar was arrested by British forces in 1925.

In 1937, he was elected as Congressman for the Uttar Pradesh Legislative Assembly. The support by leading public figure of Lucknow, Chaubey Mukta Prasad, helped him sail through the election.

From 1937 to 1944, he was imprisoned for continuing to participate with the freedom movement. In 1946, he presented a bill to establish Hindi as India's national language. The bill was passed and ruled that Hindi would become the nation's official language in 1965. However, Hindi was never made the national language as a result of the Anti-Hindi agitations of Tamil Nadu.

In 1946, Dhulekar was elected as a member of Constituent Assembly of India. From 1952 to 1957, he served one term as a member of the Parliament of India, 1st Lok Sabha.

From 1958 to 1964, he was also elected as Chairman of Uttar Pradesh Legislative Council.He conducted the proceedings and efficiently presided over the House by seeking support and guidance from senior Congress Leader Nirmal Chandra Chaturvedi, MLC.

== Books ==
- Shweta-shwatrupanishad Bhashya
- Prashnapanishad Saral Bhashya
- Atmadarshi Geeta Bhashya
- Pillars of Vedant
- Chaturvedanugami Bhashya
- Kathopnishad Saral Bhasyha
