= Poovalur =

Poovalur (Puvalur)
- Town Panchayat
- Location in Tamil Nadu, India Poovalur (Puvalur) (India)
- Coordinates: 10°54′01″N 78°49′51″E
- Country: India
- State: Tamil Nadu
- District: Tiruchirappalli
- Taluk: Lalgudi

Population (2007)
  - Total: 10,234

Languages
  - Official: Tamil
- Time zone: UTC+5:30 (IST)
- Postal code: 621 712
- Vehicle registration: TN 48

Poovalur is a panchayat town in Tiruchirappalli district in the Indian state of Tamil Nadu. Poovalur is just 3 km from its taluk headquarters Lalgudi. It lies on the Tiruchirappalli–Chidambaram national highway NH 227 . Generally the livelihood of this town's people is agriculture. Banana, paddy, and sugarcane are the notable crops grown in this area.

== Demographics ==
As of 2001 India census, Puvalur had a population of 7745. In 2007, Poovalur has 10,234 people. It is a developing panchayat. Males constitute 50% of the population and females 50%. Puvalur has an average literacy rate of 76%, higher than the national average of 59.5%: male literacy is 84%, and female literacy is 69%. In Puvalur, 10% of the population is under 6 years of age.

== Notable inhabitants ==
- Trichy Sankaran, mridangam player and teacher
