= Anti-Hindi agitations of Tamil Nadu =

Agitation against the imposition of the Hindi language

- Part of India-wide anti-Hindi imposition protests, Self-Respect Movement, and Tanittamil Iyakkam
- Date: 11 August 1937 – present (89 years, 1 month)
- Location: * Present-day Tamil Nadu, India * Tamil Nadu diaspora
- Caused by: Various attempts by the Government of India (1947–present) and the Government of Madras (during 1937–65) to promote Hindi language in the State
- Goals: To prevent the imposition of Hindi in the State
- Methods: Non-violent- Conferences, fasts, legislations, marching, media activism, internet activism, picketing, rallying, slogans, street protests, student activism.; Violent- Riots (arson, defacement, blockade, stone-throwing, crime of passion), suicide.

Parties
Government of Tamil Nadu (1967–present) Electoral parties Justice Party †; Dravida Munnetra Kazhagam; Anna Dravida Munnetra Kazhagam; Marumalarchi Dravida Munnetra Kazhagam; Viduthalai Chiruthaigal Katchi; Communist Party of India; Communist Party of India (Marxist); All-India Muslim League †; Indian Union Muslim League; Manithaneya Makkal Katchi; Tamizhaga Vazhvurimai Katchi Non-electoral organizations Self-Respect Movement †; Dravidar Kazhagam; Periyar Dravidar Kazhagam †; Dravidar Viduthalai Kazhagam; Thanthai Periyar Dravidar Kazhagam Other Tamil organizations and general public	Government of India (1947–present): Central Reserve Police Force (in 1965); Government of Madras (1937–65): Madras State Police; Auxiliary units (1965); Kerala Police; Andhra Pradesh Police; Maharashtra Police Electoral parties Indian National Congress (1937–65); Akhil Bharatiya Jana Sangh †; Janata Party †; Bharatiya Janata Party Non-electoral organizations Hindustani Seva Dal; Hindustani Hitashi Sabha; Rashtriya Swayamsevak Sangh: Other Sangh Parivar organizations

Units involved
	1965 33,000 Madras State Police personnel 5,000 military/para-military personnel

Casualties and losses
1939; 2 (Natarajan and Thalamuthu) 1965 70 (official); ~500 (unofficial) 2026; 1 (Siva Dileepan)	1965 2 Madras State Police personnel

Casualties
- Damage: 10 million
- † = defunct parties / organizations

The anti-Hindi agitations in Tamil Nadu have been ongoing intermittently in the southern Indian state of Tamil Nadu (formerly Madras State and part of Madras Presidency) since the early 20th century. The agitations involve several mass protests, riots, student and political movements in Tamil Nadu concerning the official status of Hindi in the state.

The first agitation was launched in 1937, to protest the introduction of compulsory teaching of Hindi in the schools of Madras Presidency by the first Indian National Congress (INC) government led by C. Rajagopalachari. This faced immediate opposition by Soma Sundara Bharathiyar, E. V. Ramasamy (later known as 'Periyar') and the opposition Justice Party. The three-year-long agitation was multifaceted and involved fasts, conferences, marches, picketing and protests. Government crackdown resulted in the deaths of two protesters and the arrests of 1,198 persons (including women and children). After the government resigned in 1939, the mandatory Hindi education was withdrawn in 1940. After India's independence from the United Kingdom, the adoption of an official language for the (to be) Republic was a hotly debated issue during the framing of the Indian Constitution. Succeeding an exhaustive and divisive debate, Hindi was adopted as the official language of India with English continuing as an associate official language for a pre-set period of 15 years. After the new Constitution came into effect on 26 January 1950, many non-Hindi States opposed efforts by the Union government to make Hindi the sole official language after 26 January 1965.

The Dravida Munnetra Kazhagam (DMK), a descendant of the Dravidar Kazhagam (DK) in the then Madras State, led the opposition to Hindi. To allay their fears, Prime Minister Jawaharlal Nehru enacted the Official Languages Act in 1963 to ensure the use of English beyond 1965. Still, there were apprehensions that his assurances might not be honoured by successive governments. As 26 January 1965 approached, the anti-Hindi movement gained momentum in Madras State with increased support from college students. On 25 January, a minor altercation between agitating students and INC party members triggered a full-scale riot in Madurai, eventually spreading all over the State. The riots (marked by violence, arson, looting, police firing and lathi charges) continued unabated for the next two months. Paramilitary involvement (on the request of the State government headed by INC) resulted in the deaths of about 70 people (by official estimates) including two policemen. To calm the situation, the then Prime Minister Lal Bahadur Shastri assured that English would continue as the official language as long as the non-Hindi States wanted. The riots and student agitation subsided after this.

The agitations led to major political changes in the state. The DMK won the 1967 assembly election and the INC never managed to recapture power in the state since then. The Official Languages Act was eventually amended in 1967 by the Union government (headed by Indira Gandhi) to guarantee the indefinite use of Hindi and English as official languages. This effectively ensured the current "virtual indefinite policy of bilingualism" of the Indian Republic. There were also two similar (but smaller) agitations in 1968 and 1986 which had varying degrees of success. In the 21st century, numerous agitations in various forms have been continuing intermittently in response to covert and overt attempts of Hindi promulgation.

== Background ==
The Republic of India has hundreds of languages. During the British Raj, English was the official language. When the Indian independence movement gained momentum in the early part of the 20th century, efforts were undertaken to make Hindi as a common language to unite linguistic groups against the British government. As early as 1918, Mahatma Gandhi established the Dakshin Bharat Hindi Prachar Sabha (Institution for the Propagation of Hindi in South India). In 1925, the Indian National Congress switched the language of its official business from English to Hindi. Both Gandhi and Jawaharlal Nehru were supporters of Hindi and Congress wanted to propagate the learning of Hindi in non-Hindi speaking provinces of India. The idea of making Hindi the common language forcefully, was not acceptable to Periyar, who viewed it as an attempt to make Tamils subordinate to North Indians.

== Agitation of 1937–1940 ==
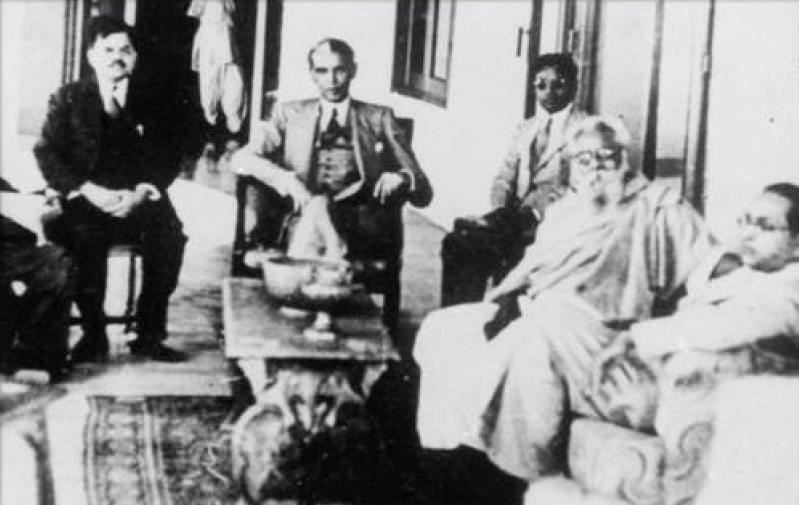
Right to left: B. R. Ambedkar, Periyar and Jinnah at Jinnah's residence in Bombay (8 January 1940)

The Indian National Congress won the 1937 elections in Madras Presidency. Rajaji became the chief minister on 14 July 1937. He was a supporter of propagating Hindi in South India. On 11 August 1937, within a month of coming to power, he announced his intention to introduce Hindi language teaching in secondary schools by issuing a policy statement. On 21 April 1938, he issued a government order making the teaching of Hindi compulsory in 125 secondary schools in the presidency. Periyar and the opposition Justice Party led by A. T. Panneerselvam immediately opposed the move. They started state-wide protests against Rajaji and Hindi.

The agitation was backed by Periyar's Self-Respect Movement and Justice Party. It also had the support of Tamil scholars like Maraimalai Adigal, Somasundara Bharathiar, K. Appadurai, Mudiyarasan and Ilakkuvanar. In December 1937, Tamil Saivite scholars were among the first to announce their opposition to the Hindi teaching in the Saiva Sidhandha Maha Samaja conference at Velur. Women also participated in the agitation in large numbers. Moovalur Ramamirtham, Narayani, Va. Ba. Thamaraikani, Munnagar Azhagiyar, Dr. S. Dharmambal, Malar Mugathammaiyar, Pattammal and Seethammal were some of the women who were arrested for participating in the agitation. On 13 November 1938, the Tamil Nadu Women's Conference was convened to demonstrate women's support for the movement. The agitation was marked by anti-Brahmin sentiments as the protesters believed Brahmins were attempting to impose Hindi and Sanskrit over Tamil. Despite the general anti-Brahminism of the agitation, a few Brahmins like Kanchi Rajagopalachari also participated in the movement. The Tamil speaking Muslims in the Madras presidency supported the agitation (in contrast to the Urdu-speaking Muslims, who supported the propagation of Hindi, since Hindi and Urdu are linguistically the same language called Hindustani). The agitation was marked by fasts, protest marches, processions, picketing of schools teaching Hindi and government offices, anti-Hindi conferences, observing an anti-Hindi day (1 July and 3 December 1938) and black flag demonstrations. It was active in the Tamil speaking districts of the presidency – Ramnad, Tirunelveli, Salem, Tanjore and North Arcot. During the course of the agitation, two protesters – Natarajan and Thalamuthu – lost their lives in police custody.

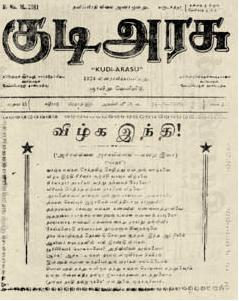
Front page of Periyar E. V. Ramasamy's periodical Kudiyarasu (3 September 1939). The headline reads "Veezhga Indhi" (Down with Hindi)

The ruling Congress Party was divided on the Hindi issue. While Rajaji and his supporters stuck to their position, Sathyamurti and Sarvepalli Radhakrishnan were against it. They wanted Rajaji to make Hindi optional or to provide a conscience clause for allowing parents to withhold their children from Hindi classes. But Rajaji was firm in his stance. The police response to the agitation grew progressively brutal in 1939. During the agitation, a total of 1,198 protesters were arrested and out of them 1,179 were convicted (73 of those jailed were women and 32 children accompanied their mothers to prison). Periyar was fined 1,000 rupees and sentenced to one year of rigorous imprisonment for inciting "women to disobey the law" (he was released within six months on 22 May 1939 citing medical grounds) and Annadurai was jailed for four months. On 7 June 1939, all those arrested for participating in the agitations were released without explanation. Rajaji also organised pro-Hindi meetings to counter the agitators. On 29 October 1939, the Congress government resigned protesting the involvement of India in the Second World War, and the Madras provincial government was placed under governor's rule. On 31 October, Periyar suspended the agitation and asked the governor to withdraw the compulsory Hindi order. On 21 February 1940, Governor Erskine issued a press communique withdrawing compulsory Hindi teaching and making it optional.

== Agitations of 1946–1950 ==
From 1946 to 1950, there were sporadic agitations against Hindi by the Dravidar Kazhagam (DK) and Periyar. Whenever the government introduced Hindi as a compulsory language in schools, anti-Hindi protests happened and succeeded in stopping the move. The largest anti-Hindi imposition agitations in this period occurred from 1948 to 1950. After India's independence in 1947, the Congress government at the centre urged all states to make Hindi compulsory in schools. The Congress government of Madras Presidency under Omandur Ramasamy Reddiar complied and made Hindi compulsory in the 1948–49 academic year. It also introduced a minimum qualification in Hindi for the promotion of students to higher classes. Periyar once again launched agitation against the imposition of Hindi. The 1948 agitation was supported by former Congress nationalists like M. P. Sivagnanam and Thiru. Vi. Ka, who recanted their earlier pro-Hindi policies. On 17 July, the DK convened an all party anti-Hindi conference to oppose the compulsory Hindi teaching. As in the agitation from 1938 to 1940, this agitation was also characterized by strikes, black flag demonstrations and anti-Hindi processions. When Rajaji (then the Governor-General of India) visited Madras on 23 August, the DK staged a black flag demonstration against his visit. On 27 August, Periyar and Annadurai were arrested. The government did not change its position on Hindi and the agitation continued. On 18 December, Periyar and other DK leaders were arrested again. A compromise was reached between the government and agitators. The government stopped the legal action against the agitators and they in turn dropped the agitation on 26 December 1948. Eventually, the government made Hindi teaching optional beginning in 1950. Students who did not want to learn Hindi were allowed to participate in other school activities during Hindi classes.

== Official languages and the Indian Constitution ==
The Indian Constituent Assembly was established on 9 December 1946, for drafting a Constitution when India became independent. The Constituent Assembly witnessed fierce debates on the language issue. The adoption of a National Language, the language in which the Constitution was to be written in and the language in which the proceedings of the Constituent Assembly were to be conducted were the main linguistic questions debated by the framers of the Constitution. On one side were members from the "Hindi-speaking provinces" like Algu Rai Sastri, R.V. Dhulekar, Balkrishna Sharma, Purushottam Das Tandon, (all from United Provinces), Babunath Gupta (Bihar), Hari Vinayak Pataskar (Bombay) and Ravi Shankar Shukla, Seth Govind Das (Central Provinces and Berar). They moved a large number of pro-Hindi amendments and argued for adopting Hindi as the sole National Language. On 10 December 1946, Dhulekar declared "People who do not know Hindi have no right to stay in India. People who are present in the House to fashion a constitution for India and do not know Hindi are not worthy to be members of this assembly. They had better leave."

The members of the Constituent Assembly in favor of recognizing Hindi as the National Language of India was further divided into two camps: the Hindi faction comprising Tandon, Ravi Shankar Shukla, Govind Das, Sampurnanand, and K. M. Munshi; and the Hindi faction represented by Jawaharlal Nehru and Abul Kalam Azad. The adoption of Hindi as the national language was opposed by certain Constituent Assembly members from South India like T.T. Krishnamachari, G. Durgabai, T. A. Ramalingam Chettiar, N. G. Ranga, N. Gopalaswamy Ayyangar (all belonging to "Madras") and S. V. Krishnamurthy Rao (Mysore). This anti-Hindi block favoured "retaining" English as the "official" language. Their views were reflected in the following pronouncement of Krishnamachari:

We disliked the English language in the past. I disliked it because I was forced to learn Shakespeare and Milton, for which I had no taste at all. If we are going to be compelled to learn Hindi, I would perhaps not be able to learn it because of my age, and perhaps I would not be willing to do it because of the amount of constraint you put on me. This kind of intolerance makes us fear that the strong Centre which we need, a strong Centre which is necessary will also mean the enslavement of people who do not speak the language at the centre. I would, Sir, convey a warning on behalf of people of the South for the reason that there are already elements in South India who want separation ..., and my honourable friends in U.P. do not help us in any way by flogging their idea of "Hindi Imperialism" to the maximum extent possible. So, it is up to my friends in Uttar Pradesh to have a whole India; it is up to them to have a Hindi-India. The choice is theirs.

After three years of debate, the assembly arrived at a compromise at the end of 1949. It was called the Munshi-Ayyangar formula (after K.M. Munshi and Gopalaswamy Ayyangar) and it struck a balance between the demands of all groups. Part XVII of the Indian Constitution was drafted according to this compromise. It did not have any mention of a "National Language". Instead, it defined only the "Official Languages" of the Union:

Hindi in Devanagari script would be the official language of the Indian Union. For fifteen years, English would also be used for all official purposes (Article 343). A language commission could be convened after five years to recommend ways to promote Hindi as the sole official language and to phase out the use of English (Article 344). Official communication between states and between states and the Union would be in the official language of the union (Article 345). English would be used for all legal purposes – in court proceedings, bills, laws, rules and other regulations (Article 348). The Union was duty bound to promote the spread and usage of Hindi (Article 351).

India became independent on 15 August 1947 and the Constitution was adopted on 26 January 1950.

== The language commission ==
The adoption of English as official language along with Hindi was heavily criticized by pro-Hindi politicians like Jana Sangh's founder Syama Prasad Mookerjee, who demanded that Hindi should be made National language. Soon after the Constitution was adopted on 26 January 1950, efforts were made to propagate Hindi for official usage. In 1952, the Ministry of Education launched a voluntary Hindi teaching scheme. On 27 May 1952, use of Hindi was introduced in warrants for judicial appointments. In 1955, in-house Hindi training was started for all ministries and departments of the central government. On 3 December 1955, the government started using Hindi (along with English) for "specific purposes of the Union".

As provided for by Article 343, Nehru appointed the First Official Language Commission under the chairmanship of B. G. Kher on 7 June 1955. The commission delivered its report on 31 July 1956. It recommended a number of steps to eventually replace English with Hindi (the report registered "dissenting notes" from two members – P. Subbarayan from Madras State and Suniti Kumar Chatterji from West Bengal. The Parliamentary Committee on Official Language, chaired by Govind Ballabh Pant was constituted in September 1957 to review the Kher commission report. After two years of deliberations, the Pant Committee submitted its recommendations to the President on 8 February 1959. It recommended that Hindi should be made the primary official language with English as the subsidiary one. The Kher Commission and the Pant Committee recommendations were condemned and opposed by self-described "non-Hindi" politicians like Frank Anthony and P. Subbarayan. The Academy of Telugu opposed the switch from English to Hindi in a convention held in 1956. Rajaji, once a staunch supporter of Hindi, organised an All India Language Conference (attended by representatives of Tamil, Malayalam, Telugu, Assamese, Oriya, Marathi, Kannada and Bengali languages) on 8 March 1958 to oppose the switch, declaring [that] "Hindi is as much foreign to non-Hindi speaking people as English is to the protagonists of Hindi."

As the opposition to Hindi grew stronger, Nehru tried to reassure the concerns of "non-Hindi speakers". Speaking in the parliamentary debate on a bill introduced by Anthony to include English in the Eighth Schedule, Nehru gave an assurance to them (on 7 August 1959):

I believe also two things. As I just said, there must be no imposition. Secondly, for an indefinite period – I do not know how long – I should have, I would have English as an associate, additional language which can be used not because of facilities and all that ... but because I do not wish the people of Non-Hindi areas to feel that certain doors of advance are closed to them because they are forced to correspond – the Government, I mean – in the Hindi language. They can correspond in English. So I could have it as an alternate language as long as people require it and the decision for that – I would leave not to the Hindi-knowing people, but to the non-Hindi-knowing people.

This assurance momentarily allayed the fears of the South Indians. But the Hindi proponents were dismayed and Pant remarked "Whatever I achieved in two years, the prime minister destroyed in less than two minutes".

== DMK's "Anti-Hindi imposition" policies ==
The Dravida Munnetra Kazhagam (DMK) which split from the Dravidar Kazhagam in 1949, inherited the anti-Hindi policies of its parent organisation. DMK's founder Annadurai had earlier participated in the anti-Hindi imposition agitations during 1938–40 and in the 1940s. In July 1953, the DMK launched the Kallakudi demonstration against changing the name of a town from Kallakudi to Dalmiapuram. They claimed that the town's name (after Ramkrishna Dalmia) symbolised the exploitation of South India by the North. On 15 July 1953, M. Karunanidhi (later Chief Minister of Tamil Nadu) and other DMK members erased the Hindi name in Dalmiapuram railway station's name board and lay down on the tracks. In the altercation with the police that followed the protests, two DMK members lost their lives and several others including Karunanidhi and Kannadhasan were arrested.

In the 1950s DMK continued its anti-Hindi policies along with the secessionist demand for Dravida Nadu. On 28 January 1956, Annadurai along with Periyar and Rajaji signed a resolution passed by the Academy of Tamil Culture endorsing the continuation of English as the official language. On 21 September 1957 the DMK convened an anti-Hindi Conference to protest against the imposition of Hindi. It observed 13 October 1957 as "anti-Hindi Day". On 31 July 1960, another open air anti-Hindi conference was held at Kodambakkam, Madras. In November 1963, DMK dropped its secessionist demand in the wake of the Sino-Indian War and the passage of the anti-secessionist 16th Amendment to the Indian Constitution. But the anti-Hindi stance remained and hardened with the passage of Official Languages Act of 1963. The DMK's view on Hindi's qualifications for official language status were reflected in Annadurai's response to the "numerical superiority of Hindi" argument: "If we had to accept the principle of numerical superiority while selecting our national bird, the choice would have fallen not on the peacock but on the common crow."

== Official Languages Act of 1963 ==
As the deadline stipulated in Part XVII of the Constitution for switching to Hindi as primary official language approached, the central government stepped up its efforts to spread Hindi's official usage. In 1960, compulsory training for Hindi typing and stenography was started. The same year, India's president Rajendra Prasad acted on the Pant Committee's recommendations and issued orders for preparation of Hindi glossaries, translating procedural literature and legal codes to Hindi, imparting Hindi education to government employees and other efforts for propagating Hindi. Nehru said that the presidential orders did not contradict his earlier assurance and reassured that there would be no imposition of Hindi on non-Hindi speakers.

To give legal status to Nehru's assurance of 1959, the Official Languages Act was passed in 1963. In Nehru's own words:

This is a Bill, in continuation of what has happened in the past, to remove a restriction which had been placed by the Constitution on the use of English after a certain date i.e. 1965. It is just to remove that restriction that this is placed.

The Bill was introduced in Parliament on 21 January 1963. Opposition to the Bill came from DMK members who objected to the usage of the word "may" instead of "shall" in section 3 of the Bill. That section read: "the English language may ... continue to be used in addition to Hindi". The DMK argued was that the term "may" could be interpreted as "may not" by future administrations. They feared that the minority opinion would not be considered and non-Hindi speakers' views would be ignored. On 22 April, Nehru assured the parliamentarians that, for that particular case "may" had the same meaning as "shall". The DMK then demanded, if that was the case why "shall" was not used instead of "may". Leading the opposition to the Bill was Annadurai (then a Member of the Rajya Sabha). He pleaded for an indefinite continuation of the status quo and argued that continued use of English as official language would "distribute advantages or disadvantages evenly" among Hindi and non-Hindi speakers. The Bill was passed on 27 April without any change in the wording. As he had warned earlier, Annadurai launched statewide protests against Hindi. In November 1963, Annadurai was arrested along with 500 DMK members for burning part XVII of the Constitution at an anti-Hindi Conference. He was sentenced to six months in prison. On 25 January 1964, a DMK member, Chinnasamy, committed suicide at Trichy by self-immolation, to protest the "imposition of Hindi". He was claimed as the first "language martyr" of the second round of the anti-Hindi struggle by the DMK.

Nehru died in May 1964 and Lal Bahadur Shastri became Prime Minister of India. Shastri and his senior cabinet members Morarji Desai and Gulzari Lal Nanda were strong supporters of Hindi being the sole official language. This increased the apprehension that Nehru's assurances of 1959 and 1963 would not be kept despite Shastri's assurances to the contrary. Concerns over the preference of Hindi in central government jobs, civil service examinations and the fear that English would be replaced with Hindi as medium of instruction brought students into the anti-Hindi imposition agitation camp in large numbers. On 7 March 1964, the chief minister of Madras State, M. Bhaktavatsalam at a session of the Madras Legislative Assembly recommended the introduction of Three-language formula (English, Hindi and Tamil) in the state. Apprehension over the Three-language formula increased student support for the anti-Hindi cause.

== Agitation of 1965 ==
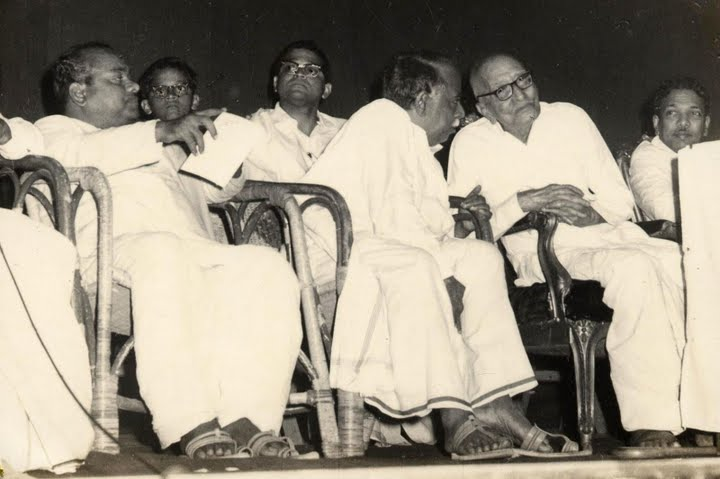
(Front row : left to right) K. A. Mathialagan, C. N. Annadurai, Rajaji and M. Karunanidhi

As 26 January 1965 approached, the anti-Hindi imposition agitation in Madras State grew in numbers and urgency. The Tamil Nadu Students Anti Hindi Agitation Council was formed in January as an umbrella student organisation to coordinate the anti-Hindi efforts. The office bearers of the council were student union leaders from all over Madras State including P. Seenivasan, K. Kalimuthu, Jeeva Kalaimani, Na. Kamarasan, Seyaprakasam, Ravichandran, Tiruppur. S. Duraiswamy, Sedapatti Muthaiah, Durai Murugan, K. Raja Mohammad, Navalavan, M. Natarajan and L. Ganesan.

Several student conferences were organised throughout the state to protest against Hindi imposition. On 17 January, the Madras State Anti-Hindi Conference was convened at Salem and was attended by 700 delegates from Madras, Maharashtra, Kerala and Mysore. They called for the indefinite suspension of Part XVII of the constitution. The Home and Information & Broadcasting ministries of the central government (headed by Nanda and Indira Gandhi respectively) upped the ante and issued circulars for replacing English with Hindi from 26 January. On 16 January, Annadurai announced that 26 January (also the Republic Day of India) would be observed as a day of mourning. Chief minister Bhaktavatsalam warned that the state government would not tolerate the sanctity of the Republic day blasphemed and threatened the students with "stern action" if they participated in politics. The DMK advanced the "Day of Mourning" by a day. On 25 January, Annadurai was taken into preventive custody along with 3000 DMK members to forestall the agitations planned for the next day. On 26 January, 50,000 students from Madras city's colleges marched from Napier park to the Government secretariat at Fort St. George and unsuccessfully tried to petition the chief minister.

On 25 January, a clash between agitating students and Congress party workers in Madurai went out of control and became a riot. Rioting soon spread to other parts of the State. Police responded with lathi charges and firing on student processions. Acts of arson, looting and damage to public property became common. Railway cars and Hindi name boards at railway stations were burned down; telegraph poles were cut and railway tracks displaced. The Bhaktavatsalam Government considered the situation as a law and order problem and brought in para military forces to quell the agitation. Incensed by police action, violent mobs killed two police men. Several agitators committed suicide by self-immolation and by consuming poison. In two weeks of riots, around 70 people were killed (by official estimates). Some unofficial reports put the death toll as high as 500. A large number of students were arrested. The damage to property was assessed to be ten million rupees.

On 28 January, classes in Madras University, Annamalai University and other colleges and schools in the state were suspended indefinitely. Within the Congress, opinion was divided: one group led by K. Kamaraj wanted the government not to impose Hindi on the Tamils; but others like Morarji Desai did not relent. Home minister Nanda agreed with Bhaktavatsalam's handling of the agitation. Rioting continued throughout the first week of February and by the second week students lost control of the agitation. Violence continued despite Annadurai's appeal for calm. Efforts were made by both sides to find a compromise. On 11 February, C. Subramaniam and O. V. Alagesan, two union ministers from Madras state, resigned protesting the government's language policy. President Sarvepalli Radhakrishnan refused to accept the Prime Minister Shastri's recommendation that their resignations be accepted. Shastri backed down and made a broadcast through All India Radio on 11 February. Expressing shock over the riots, he promised to honour Nehru's assurances. He also assured Tamils that English would continue to be used for centre-state and intrastate communications and that the All India Civil Services examination would continue to be conducted in English.

=== Impact ===
Shastri's assurances calmed down the volatile situation. On 12 February, the students council postponed the agitation indefinitely and on 16 February, C. Subramaniam and O. V. Alagesan withdrew their resignations. Sporadic acts of protests and violence continued to happen throughout February and early March. On 7 March, the administration withdrew all the cases filed against the student leaders and on 14 March, the Anti-Hindi Agitation Council dropped the agitation. Shastri's climbdown angered the pro-Hindi activists in North India. Members of Jan Sangh went about the streets of New Delhi, blackening out English signs with tar. The agitation for imposition slowly changed into a general anti-Congress organisation. In the 1967 election, student leader P. Seenivasan contested against Kamaraj in the Virudhunagar constituency. A large number of students from all over the state campaigned for him and ensured his victory: the Congress party was defeated and DMK came to power for the first time in Madras State.

The Anti-Hindi imposition agitations in Tamil Nadu also had a considerable impact on the neighbouring states of Andhra Pradesh, Mysore and Kerala. The 1965 agitations evoked a strong response from the Tamils of Bangalore city. In Mysore, over 2000 agitators gathered to protest Hindi and the police had to launch a lathi charge when the agitation grew violent. In Andhra Pradesh, trains were damaged and colleges were shut down.

== Official Languages (Amendment) Act of 1967 ==
=== Amendment efforts in 1965 ===
Efforts to amend the Official Languages Act according to Shastri's assurances given in February 1965 faced stiff resistance from the pro-Hindi lobby. On 16 February 55 MPs from 8 different states publicly expressed their disapproval of any change in the Language policy. On 19 February 19 MPs from Maharashtra and Gujarat voiced their opposition for change and on 25 February 106 Congress MPs met the Prime Minister to request him not to amend the act. However, Congress MPs from Madras did not debate the issue on the Parliament floor but met the Prime Minister on 12 March. Congress and opposition parties hesitated to debate the issue in Parliament as they did not wish to make their bitter divisions in public. On 22 February at a meeting in Congress Working Committee, K. Kamaraj pressed for the amendment to Official Languages Act, but received instant opposition from Morarji Desai, Jagjivan Ram and Ram Subhag. The Congress working committee finally agreed to a resolution which amounted to slowing down of Hindi-isation, strong implementation of the three language formula in Hindi and non-Hindi speaking states, and conduct of the public services exam in all regional languages. These decisions were agreed upon during the Chief Ministers' meeting which was held on 24 February.

The three language formula was not strictly enforced either in South or Hindi-speaking areas. The changes to public services exams were impractical and not well received by government officials. The only real concession to the south was the assurance that the Official Languages Act would be modified. However, any effort to follow through with that pledge received stiff resistance. In April 1965, a meeting of a cabinet sub-committee comprising Gulzari lal Nanda, A. K. Sen, Satyanarayan Sinha, Mahavir Tyagi, M. C. Chagla and S. K. Patil and but no southern members debated the issue and could not come to any agreement. The sub-committee recommended the continuation of English and Hindi as joint link languages and was not in favour of either quota system or use of regional languages in public services exams. They drafted an amendment to Official Languages Act incorporating Nehru's assurances explicitly. This Bill guaranteeing the use of English in inter-state and state-Union communications as long as desired by Non-Hindi states was approved for discussion by the Speaker on 25 August. But it was withdrawn after a bitter debate citing inopportune time due to the ongoing Punjabi Suba movement and Kashmir crisis at that time.

=== Amendment in 1967 ===
Shastri died in January 1966 and Indira Gandhi became prime minister. The election of 1967 saw Congress retaining power with a reduced majority in the centre. In Madras State, Congress was defeated and DMK came to power thanks to the support of the entire student community who had taken up the challenge thrown by Kamaraj to defeat him in the elections. The Students' Election Army did door to door campaign urging people to vote against Congress to teach them a lesson for all the atrocities committed by the Bhaktavatsalam Government to students under Defence of India Rules etc., P. Sreenivasan defeated Kamaraj in Virudhunagar. In November 1967, a new attempt to amend the Bill was made. On 27 November, the Bill was tabled in Parliament; it was passed on 16 December (by 205 votes to 41 against). It received presidential assent on 8 January 1968 and came into effect. The Amendment modified section 3 of the 1963 act to guarantee the "virtual indefinite policy of bilingualism" (English and Hindi) in official transactions.

== Later agitations ==
=== 1968 ===
The anti-Hindi imposition activists from Madras State were not satisfied with the 1967 Amendment, as it did not address their concerns about the three language formula. However, with DMK in power, they hesitated to restart the agitation. The Tamil Nadu Students' Anti-Hindi Agitation council split into several factions. The moderate factions favored letting Annadurai and the government to deal with the situation. The extremist factions restarted the agitations. They demanded scrapping of the three language formula and an end to teaching of Hindi, abolishing the use of Hindi commands in the National Cadet Corps (NCC), banning of Hindi films and songs and closure of the Dakshina Bharat Hindi Prachara Sabha (Institution for Propagation of Hindi in South India).

On 19 December 1967, the agitation was restarted. It turned violent on 21 December and acts of arson and looting were reported in the state. Annadurai defused the situation by accepting most of their demands. On 23 January 1968, a resolution was passed in the Legislative Assembly. It accomplished the following:

The Three-Language Policy was scrapped and Hindi was eliminated from the curriculum. Only English and Tamil were to be taught and the use of Hindi commands in the NCC was banned. Tamil was to be introduced as the medium of instruction in all colleges and as the "language of administration" within five years, the Central Government was urged to end the special status accorded to Hindi in the Constitution and "treat all languages equally", and was urged to provide financial assistance for development of all languages mentioned in the Eighth Schedule of the Constitution. These measures satisfied the agitators and "normalcy" returned by February 1968.

=== 1986 ===
In 1986, Indian Prime minister Rajiv Gandhi introduced the "National Education Policy". This education policy provided for setting up Navodaya Schools, where the DMK claimed teaching of Hindi would be compulsory. The Anna Dravida Munnetra Kazhagam (ADMK) led by M. G. Ramachandran (which had split from the DMK in 1972), was in power in Tamil Nadu and the DMK was the main opposition party. Karunanidhi announced an agitation against the opening of Navodaya schools in Tamil Nadu. The Jawahar Navodaya Vidyalaya program, supported fully by the Ministry of Human Resource Development, was established to identify gifted and talented students from economically disadvantaged and historically neglected communities, throughout every state and Union Territory in India and provide for them an education on par with elite residential schools traditionally available in India only for children of the wealthy as well as children of the political class. On 13 November, the Tamil Nadu Legislative Assembly unanimously passed a resolution demanding the repeal of Part XVII of the constitution and for making English the sole official language of the union.

On 17 November 1986, DMK members protested against the new education policy by burning Part XVII of the Constitution. 20,000 DMK members, including Karunanidhi, were arrested. 21 persons committed suicide by self-immolation. Karunanidhi was sentenced to ten weeks of rigorous imprisonment. Ten DMK MLAs including K. Anbazhagan were expelled from the Legislative Assembly by the speaker P. H. Pandian. Rajiv Gandhi assured Members of Parliament from Tamil Nadu that Hindi would not be imposed. As part of the compromise, Navodaya schools were not established in Tamil Nadu. Currently, Tamil Nadu is the only state in India without Navodaya schools.

=== 2014 ===
In 2014, the Home Ministry ordered that "government employees and officials of all ministries, departments, corporations or banks, who have made official accounts on social networking sites should use Hindi, or both Hindi and English but give priority to Hindi". This move was immediately opposed by all the political parties in Tamil Nadu. Terming the move on use of Hindi as being "against letter and spirit" of the Official Languages Act the Tamil Nadu Chief Minister Jayalalithaa cautioned that this direction may "cause disquiet to the people of Tamil Nadu who are very proud of and passionate about their linguistic heritage", and asked the prime minister to suitably modify the instructions to ensure that English was the language of communication on social media. The major opposition party Indian National Congress advised prudence, expressing fear that such directions may result in a backlash in non-Hindi states, especially Tamil Nadu and also said that the "Government would be well-advised to proceed with caution". These protests ensured the continuous official usage of English.

=== 2026 ===
In 2026, Southern Railway named the newly constructed divisional office in Tiruchirappalli as “Kartavya Dwar,” using Hindi along with transliterations in Tamil and English. The naming decision led to controversy in the state of Tamil Nadu, where several political leaders, including Chief Minister M. K. Stalin, criticized it as an instance of Hindi imposition. Members of the DMK organized a protest in front of the divisional office, during which the words “Kartavya Dwar” were defaced with black paint. Following the protest, authorities of the Tiruchirappalli Railway Division removed the name from the building. The May 17 Movement organised protests at various railway stations against changes to the signboards, in which Hindi was moved to the middle position instead of the bottom as in the earlier design; during the protests, Hindi lettering on the boards was defaced with black paint. Siva Dileepan, a member of the May 17 Movement, died after reportedly jumping in front of a train during the protest.

== Impact ==
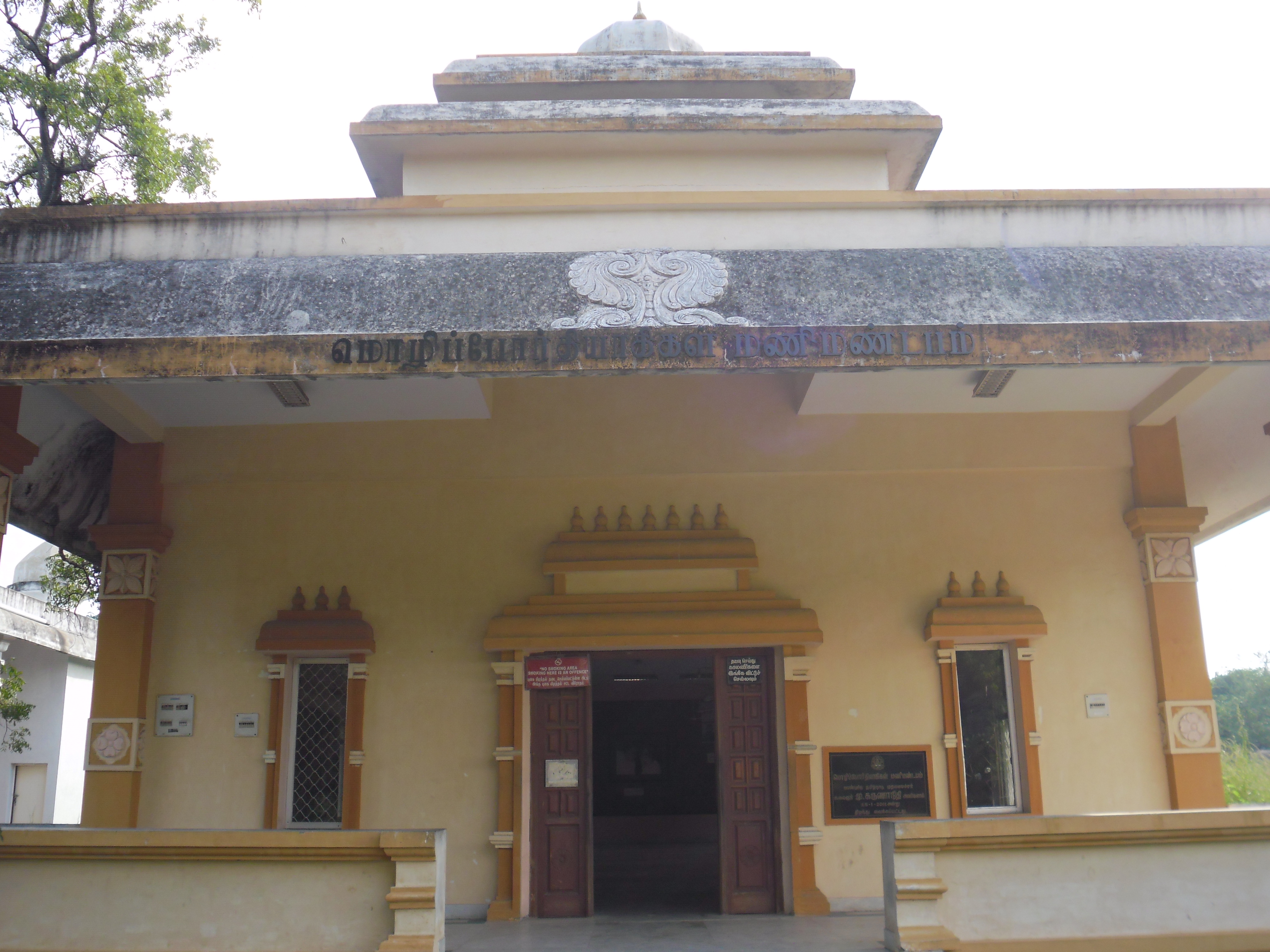
A memorial for those who died in the Anti-Hindi imposition agitations in Chennai

The anti-Hindi imposition agitations of 1937–40 and 1940–50 led to a change of guard in the Madras Presidency. The main opposition party to the Indian National Congress in the state, the Justice Party, came under Periyar's leadership on 29 December 1938. In 1944, the Justice Party was renamed as Dravidar Kazhagam. The political careers of many later leaders of the Dravidian Movement, such as C. N. Annadurai and M. Karunanidhi, started with their participation in these agitations. The agitations stopped the compulsory teaching of Hindi in the state. The agitations of the 1960s played a crucial role in the defeat of the Tamil Nadu Congress party in the 1967 elections and the continuing dominance of Dravidian parties in Tamil Nadu politics. Many political leaders of the DMK and ADMK, like P. Seenivasan, K. Kalimuthu, Durai Murugan, Tiruppur. S. Duraiswamy, Sedapatti Muthaiah, K. Raja Mohammad, M. Natarajan and L. Ganesan, owe their entry and advancement in politics to their stints as student leaders during the agitations, which also reshaped the Dravidian Movement and broadened its political base, when it shifted from its earlier pro-Tamil (and anti-Brahmin) stance to a more inclusive one, which was both anti-Hindi and pro-English. Finally, the current two-language education policy followed in Tamil Nadu is also a direct result of the agitations.

In the words of Sumathi Ramaswamy (professor of history at Duke University),

[The anti-Hindi imposition agitations knit] together diverse, even incompatible, social and political interests ... Their common cause against Hindi imposition had thrown together religious revivalists like Maraimalai Atikal (1876–1950) with avowed atheists like "Periyar" Ramasami and Bharathidasan (1891–1964); men who supported the Indian cause like T.V. Kalyanasundaram (1883–1953) and M. P. Sivagnanam with those who wanted to secede from India like Annadurai and M. Karunanidhi (b. 1924); university professors like Somasundara Bharati (1879–1959) and M.S. Purnalingam Pillai (1866–1947) with uneducated street poets, populist pamphleteers and college students.

The anti-Hindi imposition agitations ensured the passage of the Official Languages Act of 1963 and its amendment in 1967, thus ensuring the continued use of English as an official language of India. They effectively brought about the "virtual indefinite policy of bilingualism" of the Indian Republic.

== In popular culture ==
The song "Chera Chola Pandiyar" from the Tamil film Raman Ethanai Ramanadi (1970) features a line "Tēṉaip pōṉṟa tamiḻ irukka vēṟu pāṣai etaṟku" (transl. “When Tamil is as [sweet as] honey, why [impose/accept] another language?”). This line is a possible allusion to the spirit of the agitations.

In the political satire film Muhammad bin Tughluq (1971), the titular character (actually an imposter named Mahadevan - played by Cho Ramaswamy) becomes the Prime Minister of India and introduces Persian as the national language. The film uses archival footage of actual anti-Hindi protests to depict the subsequent demonstrations.

The film Indru Poi Naalai Vaa (1981) is famous for a comic scene in which one of the protagonists - Rajendran (G Ramli) - attends a home tuition by IC Govindasamy (John Amirtharaj). In this scene, Govindasamy wants Rajendran to repeat a Hindi sentence "Ek gaon mein ek kisan rehta tha" (transl. “There was a farmer who lived in a village”). But however much he tries, Rajendran can only finish the sentence as "...raghu thatha" (transl. “Grandpa Raghu” ; 'thatha' in Tamil means "grandpa") instead of "rehta tha" (transl. “lived”). About this scene, filmmaker K. Bhagyaraj said, "When I wrote that character..., I thought it would be a comedy that would strike a chord with the people. Because even when I was studying, there were all these protests against Hindi imposition. So, Hindi as a language is always looked at from a different perspective."

The film Uzhaippali (1993) features a comic scene in which the protagonist Tamilarasan alias Tamilazhagan (Rajinikanth), dressed up as the deity Shiva, is pursued by the police. He gets a lift from a scooter rider. When the scooter is about to enter a road marked 'No Entry', Tamilarasan shouts "Aise mat jao!" (transl. “Don't go like that!”) to the rider. The latter replies "Is Bhagavan supposed to speak Hindi?...If [one] speaks [it] in this town, [people] will smear [it/you] with tar". His warning is an allusion to instances during the agitations where Hindi signs were blackened out with tar.

The biopic film Kamaraj (2004) features scenes of the 1965 agitation, with a voiceover supposed to be Annadurai's, explaining his opposition to Hindi imperialism. This scene occurs after the resignation of Kamaraj (played by Richard Madhuram) as Chief Minister of Madras State and the succession of Bhaktavatsalam.

The film Raghu Thatha (2024) has anti-Hindi imposition as a theme. Its title is inspired by the scene from Indru Poi Naalai Vaa. Also, it features a song "Ek Gaon Mein", inspired by the famous phrase from the earlier film.

The film Parasakthi (2026) follows two brothers participating in the 1965 agitation.

== See also ==
- Linguistic imperialism
- Hindi–Urdu controversy
- Bengali language movement
- Bengali Language Movement (Barak Valley)
- Bengali Language Movement (Manbhum)
- International Mother Language Day
- Hindi imposition in India
- Mayiladuthurai Sarangapani
