= La Sa Ra =

Lalgudi Saptarishi Ramamrutham
- Born: Lalgudi Saptarishi Ramamrutham; 30 October 1915
- Died: 30 October 2007 (aged 92); Chennai
- Citizenship: Indian
- Occupation: Banker at Punjab National Bank
- Spouse: Hemavathi
- Children: Gayathri (Daughter),Jayaraman, Kannan, Saptarishi, Chandrasekaran,Srikanth (Sons).
- Parent(s): Saptarishi (Father) & Srimathi (Mother)
- Writing career
- Pen name: La Sa Ra
- Language: Tamil
- Subject: Literature
- Notable awards: Sahitya Akademi Award 1989

Lalgudi Saptarishi Ramamrutham (30 October 1915 – 30 October 2007) was an eminent Tamil novelist, who authored 300 short stories, 6 novels and 10 collections of essays. He won Sahitya Akademi Award for his contributions to Tamil literature. He died on his ninety-second birthday.

== Early life and education ==
La Sa Ra was bortn to his parents Saptarishi & Srimathi on 30 October 1915. His ancestors were natives of Lalgudi, Trichy District and one of the writers of the Manikodi era. He spent his entire childhood and adolescent years in Ayyampettai village near Kanchipuram. His father took special care on his son and personally home tutored him advanced Tamil and English that instilled in him a love of Tamil and English Classics even at an early age. He studied from 8th to 10 Standard in Government School. He started writing when he was 20, originally in English and then changed over to Tamil. He worked for the Punjab National Bank for 30 years and settled down in Chennai after his retirement.

== Family ==
La. Sa. Ramamirtham was married to Hymavathi. They had four sons and one daughter — Jayaraman, Kannan, Chandrasekaran, and Srikanth, and a daughter named Gayathri.

Srikanth, known by his pen name La. Ra. Ananthapadmanaban, is the youngest son of La. Sa. Ramamirtham. He is a Tamil fiction writer recognized for his distinctive storytelling style and for continuing his father’s literary legacy. He has published over 130 independent Tamil short stories, including notable works such as Akka, Harthy, Pilot, Thanimai, Thagappan, Adaiyaalam, and Penn. His works are digitally catalogued under the verified author profile La. Ra. Ananthapadmanaban, acknowledged by Google for his contributions to contemporary Tamil digital literature.

La. Ra. Ananthapadmanaban is qualified in Computer Science, blending analytical precision with creativity in his storytelling. He cared for both his parents, La. Sa. Ramamirtham and Hymavathi, until their final days, and continues their literary tradition with dedication. He is known for maintaining a quiet literary presence

== Film career ==
La Sa Ra worked for three years as a typist in Vauhini Pictures, which then produced a series of landmark Telugu films like Vande Mataram, Sumangali, and Devata. It was then K. Ramnoth, another South Indian film director, told La Sa Ra not to waste his gift indicating that his hoping for a career in films would not be salutary.

== Banking Career ==
La Ra Sa retired as banker in Punjab National Bank

== Literary career ==
He was a pioneer of modern Tamil literature renowned for introducing a poetic, deeply psychological, and stream-of-consciousness narrative style. Beginning his literary journey around age 20 in English before switching to Tamil, he pursued writing alongside a 30-year career as a banker, ultimately producing over 300 short stories, 6 novels, and 10 essay collections. His works—most notably novels like Puthra and Abitha, and story collections like Janani—frequently explored complex human emotions, spiritual philosophy, and strong female characters. Honored with the prestigious Sahitya Akademi Award in 1989 for his autobiographical essay collection for Chintha nathi, a collection of autobiographical essays.

In 2008, his works were nationalised by the Government of Tamil Nadu

== Awards and recognition ==
- Sahitya Akademi Award in 1989

== Bibliography ==
=== Novels ===
- Puthra (புத்ர) - 1965
- Abitha (அபிதா) -1970
- Kal Sirikkirathu (கல் சிரிக்கிறது)
- Sindha Nadhi (சிந்தா நதி)
- Prayachiththam (பிராயச்சித்தம்)
- La Ra Sa Novelgal (லா.ச.ரா. நாவல்கள்)
- Kazhugu (கழுகு)
- Keralathil Engo (கேரளத்தில் எங்கோ?)
- Pancha Bootha Kathaigal (பஞ்சபூதக் கதைகள்)
- Paarkadal (பாற்கடல்)

=== Short Stories ===
- Janani (ஜனனி) - 1957
- Ithalgal (இதழ்கள்) - 1959
- Pachai Kanavu (பச்சைக்கனவு) - 1961
- Ganga (கங்கா) - 1962
- Anjali (அஞ்சலி) - 1963
- Alaigal (அலைகள்) - 1964
- Dhaya (தயா) - 1966
- Meenottam (மீனோட்டம்)
- Uththarayanam (உத்தராயணம்)
- Nesam (நேசம்)
- Putru (புற்று)
- Thulasi (துளசி)
- En priyamulla Snegithanukku (என் பிரியமுள்ள சிநேகிதனுக்கு)
- Aval (அவள்)
- Dhvani (த்வனி)
- Vilimbil (விளிம்பில்)
- Alaigal Oivathillai (அலைகள் ஓய்வதில்லை)
- Naan (நான்)
- Sowndarya (சௌந்தர்ய)
- La.sa.ra Thernthedutha Sirukathaikal (லா.ச.ரா தேர்ந்தெடுத்த சிறுகதைகள்)
- Kelvikuri: La.sa.ra Sirukathaikal (கேள்விக்குறி: லா. ச. ரா. சிறுகதைகள்)

=== Essays ===
- Mutruperatha Thedal (முற்றுப் பெறாத தேடல்)
- Unmaiyin Dharisanam (உண்மையின் தரிசனம்)
- Dharisanam (தரிசனம்)

== See also ==
- List of Sahitya Akademi Award winners for Tamil
- List of Indian writers
- List of Tamil-language writers
