= Somasundara Bharathiar =

Tamil writer

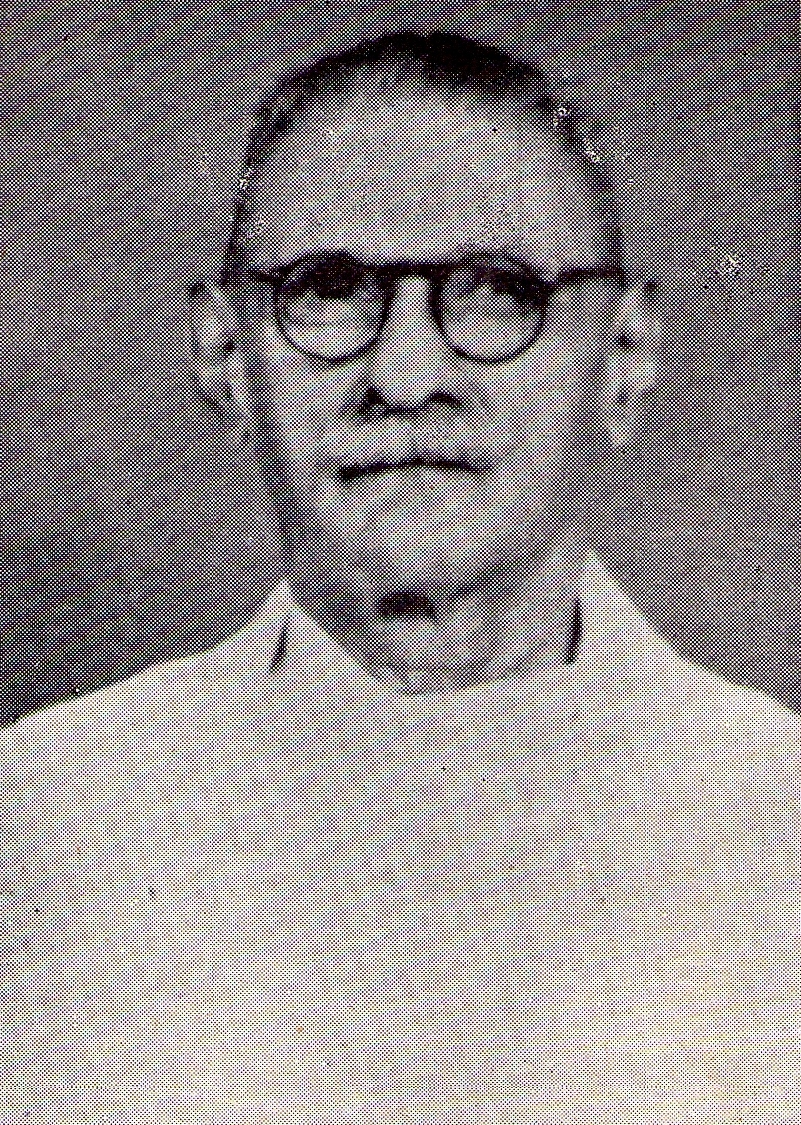
- Somasundara Bharathiar in his old age
- Born: Satyananda Somasundaran; 27 July 1879; Ettayapuram Thoothukudi district
- Died: 14 December 1959 (aged 80); Madurai
- Education: post graduate in arts, undergraduate in law
- Occupations: Lawyer, Tamil professor
- Employer(s): Annamalai University, Chidambaram
- Known for: Tamil research
- Title: Navalar, Kanakkayar.
- Spouse(s): (1) Meenatchi (2) Vasumathi
- Children: (1) Dr. Rajaram Bharathi (2) Lakmirathan Bharathi (3) Lakshmi Bharathi (4) Meenatchi (5) Dr. Lalitha Kameshwaran
- Parent(s): Ettappa Pillai, Muthammal.

Satyananda Somasundaran (27 July 1879 – 14 December 1959), also known as Somasundara Bharathiar, was a Tamil researcher, writer, professor and lawyer. He participated in the Anti-Hindi agitations of Tamil Nadu. He also headed the movement for the abolition of untouchability in Madurai.

== Early life ==
He was born to Subramaniya Nayakkar (Ettappa Pillai) - Muthammal on 27 July 1879 in Ettayapuram. He was a friend of Subramania Bharati, whose father worked with Somasudara Bharathi's father. Both Somasundaran and Subramaniyam went to a poetry competition. Both their poems were selected as best poems. Both were given the title Bharathi.
