= Pullambadi block =

Pullambadi block is a revenue block in the Tiruchirappalli district of Tamil Nadu, India. It has a total of 33 panchayat villages. It is one of the two revenue blocks in lalgudi taluk, the other one is the revenue block of lalgudi. The notable villages and towns are Kallakkudi, Malvai, Kallagam, Thapai, E.Vellanur, P.Sangenthi.
