= Kallakudi demonstration =

Political protest

1953 Kallakudi demonstration
- Part of Anti-Hindi agitations of Tamil Nadu
- Date: 15 July 1953 (72 years ago)
- Location: Kallakudi, Tiruchirappalli district, Madras State (now Tamil Nadu), India; 10.96668525367306°N 78.94989321455444°E
- Caused by: Renaming of Kallakudi as Dalmiapuram
- Goals: To revert the name Dalmiapuram to Kallakudi
- Methods: Picketing, rail blockade, defacement
- Result: Protesters arrested and sentenced to imprisonment and fine

Parties
Protesters supported by the Dravida Munnetra Kazhagam (DMK)	Government of India Government of Madras: Tiruchirappalli District Police; Dalmia Group

Lead figures
M. Karunanidhi; 4 others Rama Subbaiah; 25 others Kannadasan; 40 others: Nagore E. M. Hanifa	District Magistrate of Tiruchirappalli Constables headed by the district Deputy Superintendent of Police (DSP) and a Circle Inspector (CI)

Casualties
- Deaths: 6
- Injuries: 28 (policemen - 12; civilians - 16)
- Arrested: 31+
- Detained: M. Karunanidhi and 4 others sentenced to 5 months in prison
- Fined: M. Karunanidhi and 4 others fined ₹.35 each

The Kallakudi demonstration was organised by the Dravida Munnetra Kazhagam (DMK) on 15 July 1953 in Kallakudi, Tiruchirappalli district against naming the place as Dalmiapuram. Ramakrishna Dalmia, a businessman from Bihar, established a cement factory in Kallakudi and the place was renamed Dalmiapuram on his request. DMK opposed the move as a suppression of South Indians by North India. It was the first notable demonstration by M Karunanidhi, the five-time Chief Minister of Tamil Nadu and his party, the DMK. The DMK party blocked passenger trains during the protest.

The police opened fire on the demonstration killing two civilians and injuring 16 others. Twelve policemen were injured, including The Deputy Superintendent of Police and the Circle Inspector and ten other constables. The demonstration was the first notable demonstration by DMK and for M Karunanidhi who would go on to become the five-time Chief Minister of Tamil Nadu.

The government ordered an open judicial enquiry into the incident headed by the District Magistrate of Madurai and the Principal Subordinate Judge of Tuticorin. The judicial enquiries and later court proceedings led to Karunanidhi and the four others arrested getting sentenced to five months in prison and a fine of 35 Rupees on each. The demonstration was a part of Anti-Hindi agitations of Tamil Nadu, which has lasting political impact on Tamil Nadu.

== Background ==
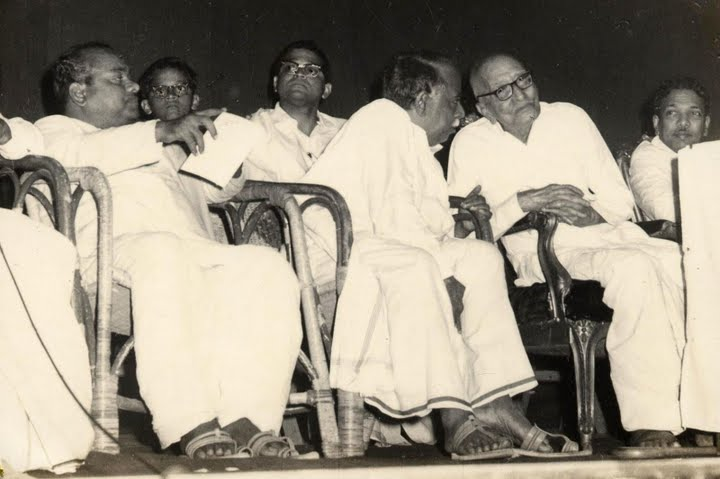
Mathialagan, VPRaman, Anna, Rajagopalachari, and Karunanidhi from left to right

The Dravida Munnetra Kazhagam (DMK) party under the leadership of Anna, wanted to launch a demonstration against the ruling Congress Party for three reasons. First, it was against the Hindi policies imposed by C. Rajagopalachari, the then Chief Minister of Madras State, and the plan was to demonstrate outside his house. Second, the party wanted to protest against Nehru who called Tamilians as "nonsense". The third reason was to oppose the request made by industrialist Ramakrishna Dalmia who established cement factory in Kallakudi and wanted to rename it as Dalmiapuram. In Annadurai's own words, "I am sending a brother to the war against educational programme and another one to the Kallakudi battlefield". Ramakrishna Dalmia, 46-year-old, who inherited a sugar mill in Bihar, started two cement industries, one each in Bihar and Kallakudi. He was challenging the Associated Cement Companies (ACC), by importing foreign machinery. While the industry at Rohat Nagar in Bihar was started without any issue, he faced opposition in Kallakudi against naming the place as Dalmiapuram.

== Demonstration ==
As per the official report as discussed during the debate in the assembly, during the early part of 15 July 1953, attempts were made to deface the name of the railway station board. A group of six people who tried to stop the morning passenger train towards Ariyalur were arrested. During the afternoon, around 2 p.m., there was larger crowd who stopped the passenger train bound to Ariyalur. The attempt of persuasion by the subdivisional Magistrate failed and police had to resort to lathi-charge. While the train was moved to the South, the obstruction by the mob and stone-throwing continued. The Deputy Superintendent of Police and the Circle Inspector on duty already sustained injuries and a shootout was ordered by the Magistrate. After the shootout, two people were killed and the crowd started dispersing in all directions. Thirteen people were treated at Lalgudi hospital, while three others in Trichy hospital. In all, the casualties were placed at two, while 16 other civilians injured. Among the police, there were twelve injuries, including that of The Deputy Superintendent of Police and the Circle Inspector and ten other constables. The government ordered an open judicial enquiry into the incident headed by the District Magistrate of Madurai and the Principal Subordinate Judge of Tuticorin. The judicial enquiries and later court proceedings ordered Karunanidhi and the four others arrested were sentenced to five months in prison and a fine of 35 Rupees was levied on each. It was found out that the two killed were passengers in the train not related to the protest.

== Legacy ==
The demonstration was the first notable demonstration by DMK, which separated from its parent Dravidar Kazhagam in 1949 and for M Karunanidhi who would go on to become the five-time Chief Minister of Tamil Nadu. It was helping the party build momentum against the ruling Congress Party. The DMK continued running the Anti-Hindi agitations of Tamil Nadu along with the secessionist demand for Dravida Nadu. C. Rajagopalachari, who was the ruling Chief Minister of the state from Congress Party had to resign in 1954 on account of internal compulsions from his own party men. K. Kamaraj who was leading the internal opposition against Rajagopalachari under the aegis of E V Ramasami (EVR), went on to become the Chief Minister of the state.

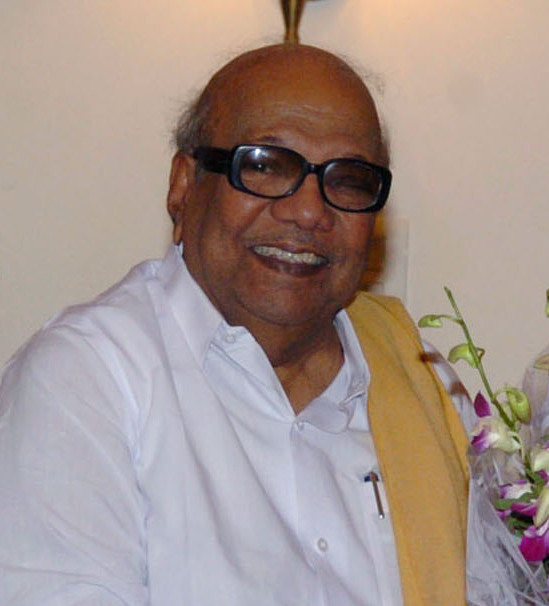
M. Karunanidhi led the protest when he was 29. He would go on to become the Chief Minister of Tamil Nadu

Whenever the government introduced Hindi as a compulsory language in schools, anti-Hindi protests happened led by Dravidar Kazhagam (DK) (erstwhile Justice Party) and E V Ramasami (EVR). EVR, who was opposing Congress on Hindi grounds so far, softened his stand and started to support Kamaraj through his regime from 1954 to 1963 as one of his demands of a non-Brahmin chief minister was met. While DK was supporting Congress and the Kamaraj regime, DMK continued opposing the Congress moves with mass demonstrations in the themes of separate Dravidian state. Some of the political historians believe that DMK used the demonstration to lobby for high representation in parliament. On 28 January 1956, Annadurai along with E V Ramasami and Rajagopalachari signed a resolution passed by the Academy of Tamil Culture endorsing the continuation of English as the official language. M. Karunanidhi who became the Chief minister after the death of Annadurai in 1969, renamed the Dalmiapuram station to Kallakudi.

=== Criticism ===
Critics have pointed out that Karunanidhi in later years as Chief Minister, renamed the Old Mahabalipuram Road to Rajiv Gandhi Salai as opposed to Tamil sentiments. Another criticism about the incident is that it did not create any impact or lasting legacy on socio-political landscape. As per historian Thanjai Nalankilli, "the Dalmiapuram – Kallakudi agitation did not have a burning root cause or a lasting impact on Tamil Nadu. Yet this rather "unimportant" agitation became front-page news and a prominent event in the history of Dravidian parties because of the dramatic lying down before the train and the subsequent high-handed police actions". Another view from the experts state that Karunanidhi carefully crafted his image during the 6 months of imprisonment utilizing double theme of dead men and earth. As per another view, Anna was upset with Karunanidhi was overdoing the agitation as it led to the death of six people.

== In popular culture ==
=== Literature ===
Kannadasan wrote a long poem titled Kallakudi Maakaaviyam, detailing the agitation. The poem was serialized in his Thendral magazine, starting from 23 July 1955.

=== Film ===
A loose allusion to the agitation is found in a scene from the film Viduthalai Part 2 (2024), wherein Tamil Nadu's PWD minister (Ilavarasu) angrily says to Chief Secretary A. Subramaniyan (Rajiv Menon) "Because an illiterate man like me put his head on a railway track, people like you got the right to educate [sic]".
