= The Song of the Sannyasin =

Poem by Swami Vivekananda

- by Swami Vivekananda
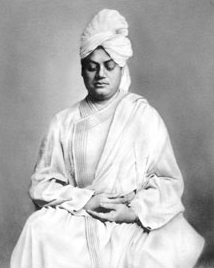
- First published in: 1895
- Country: United States
- Language: English

The Song of the Sannyasin is a poem of thirteen stanzas written by Swami Vivekananda. Vivekananda composed the poem in July 1895 when he was delivering a series of lectures to a groups of selected disciples at the Thousand Island Park, New York. In the poem he defined the ideals of Sannyasa or monastic life.

== Background ==
In the beginning of 1895, American disciples of Vivekananda requested him to organize a special session of lectures throughout the summer. Though Vivekananda was very tired at this time after multiple long sessions of public and private lectures, he assented. From mid-June to early August 1895, Vivekananda delivered a series of lectures to a group of selected disciples at the Thousand Island Park, New York.

In this period, sometime in July 1895 Vivekananda wrote The Song of the Sannyasin.

== Theme ==
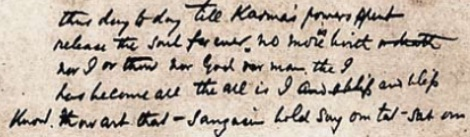
A portion of the manuscript in Vivekananda's own handwriting.

In the poem, Vivekananda glorified Hindu concepts on Sannyasa and defined the ideals of monastic life. For centuries, it has been a tradition in India to revere Sannyasis and encourage people (especially the younger ones) to work for self-realization God realization. According to Hindu beliefs, Sannyasa is the best path of life one can take. In these 13 short poems, Vivekananda discusses the concept, beliefs and ideals of Sannyasa or monastic life.

Mohit Chakrabarti in his book Swami Vivekananda: A Poetic Visionary, called these poems as Vivekananda's religious introspection. Chakrabarti told— "Quite apart from the utilitarian and segmentary approach to religion more often than not prone to achieving a platform of materialistic superiority, the religion that Vivekananda highlights here is one of emancipation of man by means of sustained devotion to and involvement in knowledge, truth and freedom."

== Stanzas ==
The Song of the Sannyasin (excerpts)
Stanza I

Wake up the note! the song that had its birth
Far off, where worldly taint could never reach,
In mountain caves and glades of forest deep,
Whose calm no sigh for lust or wealth or fame
Could ever dare to break; where rolled the stream
Of knowledge, truth, and bliss that follows both.
Sing high that note, Sannyâsin bold! Say—
"Om Tat Sat, Om!"

Stanza II

Strike off thy fetters! Bonds that bind thee down,
Of shining gold, or darker, baser ore;
Love, hate—good, bad—and all the dual throng,
Know, slave is slave, caressed or whipped, not free;
For fetters, though of gold, are not less strong to bind;
Then off with them, Sannyâsin bold! Say—
"Om Tat Sat, Om!"

Stanza III

Let darkness go; the will-o'-the-wisp that leads
With blinking light to pile more gloom on gloom.
This thirst for life, for ever quench; it drags
From birth to death, and death to birth, the soul.
He conquers all who conquers self. Know this
And never yield, Sannyâsin bold! Say—
"Om Tat Sat, Om!"

- Read all 13 stanzas of The Song of the Sannyasin at Wikisource

== Legacy ==
According to Kalpana Mohapatra, The Song of the Sannyasin is the Bible of Bengal. This is also considered as a source of inspiration for Hindu monks, specially the monks of Ramakrishna Order find solace, inspiration and guidance from these poems. Satguru Sivaya Subramuniyaswami decided to renounce the world after reading this poem in his teenage.
