= Asalambikai =

Tamil scholar and an orator

Pandithai Asalambikai Ammaiyar
- Born: 16 July 1875
- Died: 1955 (aged 79–80)
- Writing career
- Language: Tamil

Asalambikai, also known as Pandithai Asalambikai Ammaiyar, was a Tamil scholar and an orator associated with Indian National Congress.

== Early life and education ==
Asalambikai Ammaiyar was born on 16 July 1875 in Thirukovilur, North Arcot District. Married at the age of 8, she was widowed by the age of 11. Despite these early personal challenges, she pursued her education at home, studying Tamil literature and the Puranas under the guidance of Thiruvaduthurai Adheenam teacher, Subi Ramani Tamburan.

== Involvement in freedom movement ==
Asalambikai Ammaiyar was an active participant in the Indian freedom struggle. When Gandhi visited Cuddalore on 17 September 1921, Asalambikai met him on behalf of the women's organization of South Arcot district. She participated and spoke at the political and religious conferences held at various places like Tiruvannamalai during 1921, 1924 and 1929. She was part of the Civil Disobedience movement, advocated for social reforms such as the abolition of untouchability, and agitated against toddy shops.

== Literary contributions ==
After Karaikkal Ammaiyar, Asalambikai was the first one to write Anthathi Pattu – a type of poetry where the last word of the previous verse is used as the first word of the following verse. Asalambikai Ammaiyar was a prolific writer who contributed serial stories to the Swadesamitran newspaper. She authored several significant works, including:

- Gandhi Puranam: Consisting of 2034 songs, it narrates the life and teachings of Mahatma Gandhi. The first two volumes describing the events leading up to his arrest and imprisonment were published in December 1923 and the third and fourth volumes about Gandhi's services through the Khadi movement, in December 1925. The remaining four volumes were published after 1947.
- Thilakar Manmiyam: Comprising 415 songs, this work celebrates the life and contributions of Bal Gangadhar Tilak, another prominent leader of the Indian freedom movement.
- Thirivamathur Tiribu Andhadhi
- Ramalinga Swamaigal Varalatru Paadal
- Athichoodi Venba
- Kuzhanthai Swamigal Pathigam
