= Pullambadi =

- Town
- Location in Tamil Nadu, India Pullambadi (India)
- Coordinates: 10°58′N 78°55′E
- Country: India
- State: Tamil Nadu
- District: Tiruchirappalli

Government
  - Type: Town
  - Body: Town Panchayat

Population (2001)
  - Total: 9,985

Languages
  - Official: Tamil
- Time zone: UTC+5:30 (IST)
- Postal code: 621711
- Telephone code: 04329
- Vehicle registration: TN 48

Pullambadi is a Panchayat town in Tiruchirappalli district in the Indian state of Tamil Nadu. Pullambadi town panchayat heads the revenue block of Pullambadi in the taluk of Lalgudi.

== History ==
The village of Pullambadi was upgraded into town panchayat during later 19th century. The name pullambadi was derived from the word "pullinambadi" which means the village of birds.

== Demographics ==
As of 2001 India census, Pullambadi had a population of 9985. Males constitute 49% of the population and females 51%. Pullambadi has an average literacy rate of 72%, higher than the national average of 59.5%: male literacy is 80%, and female literacy is 65%. In Pullambadi, 10% of the population is under 6 years of age.

== Geography ==
This small town is situated on the Banks of river Nandhiyar which is tribute to River Kollidam.

== Attractions ==
Lord Chidambareswara Temple which is built by Kulothunga Chola I is main attraction. Recent Excavations of inscriptions at Temple reveals many Historical events during Early Chola period. Now the age of temple is around 950 years .

Devi Temple Called Kulunthalamman (Selliamman) Festival During April/May is famous in Tiruchirapalli District after Samayapuram Mariamman Temple. The festival starts with Muthal kaappu on first Tuesday of "chithirai" Tamil month followed by second kaapu on second Tuesday. Then the 10 days long festival will start.

== Education ==
- Government Industrial Training Institute (Women and men)

=== Schools ===
- Kalaivani Matriculation school
- Government Higher Secondary School
- T. E. L. C School
- R. C. School
- S. R. Matriculation school
- Pari Matriculation school
- Child Jesus Matriculation school
- Panchayat union elementary school (west)

== Hospitals ==
- Sagayamatha Hospital
- Parkavan Hospital
- Government Hospital
- Sarasvathi Hospital

== Economy ==
Agriculture is the main occupation and Paddy is main crop grown in this region. Pullambadi Canal passes through the town. Pullambadi Canal Scheme Work started during 1956-57. This canal was constructed by Mr.K.Kamaraj Former CM of Tamil Nadu during the 1960s. This was one of the biggest irrigation projects in Tamil Nadu.

== Temples ==
- Lord Shiva temple
- Kulunthalamman temple
- Om Shakthi temple
- Mariyamman temple
- Old Murugan temple
- Rahmaniya Masjid

== Gallery ==
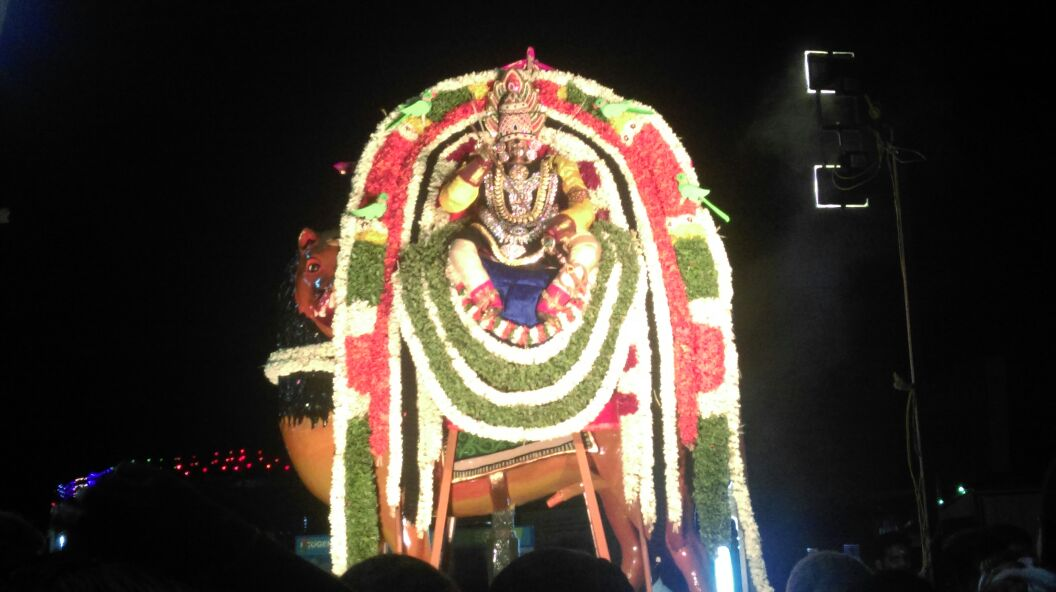
Selliamman

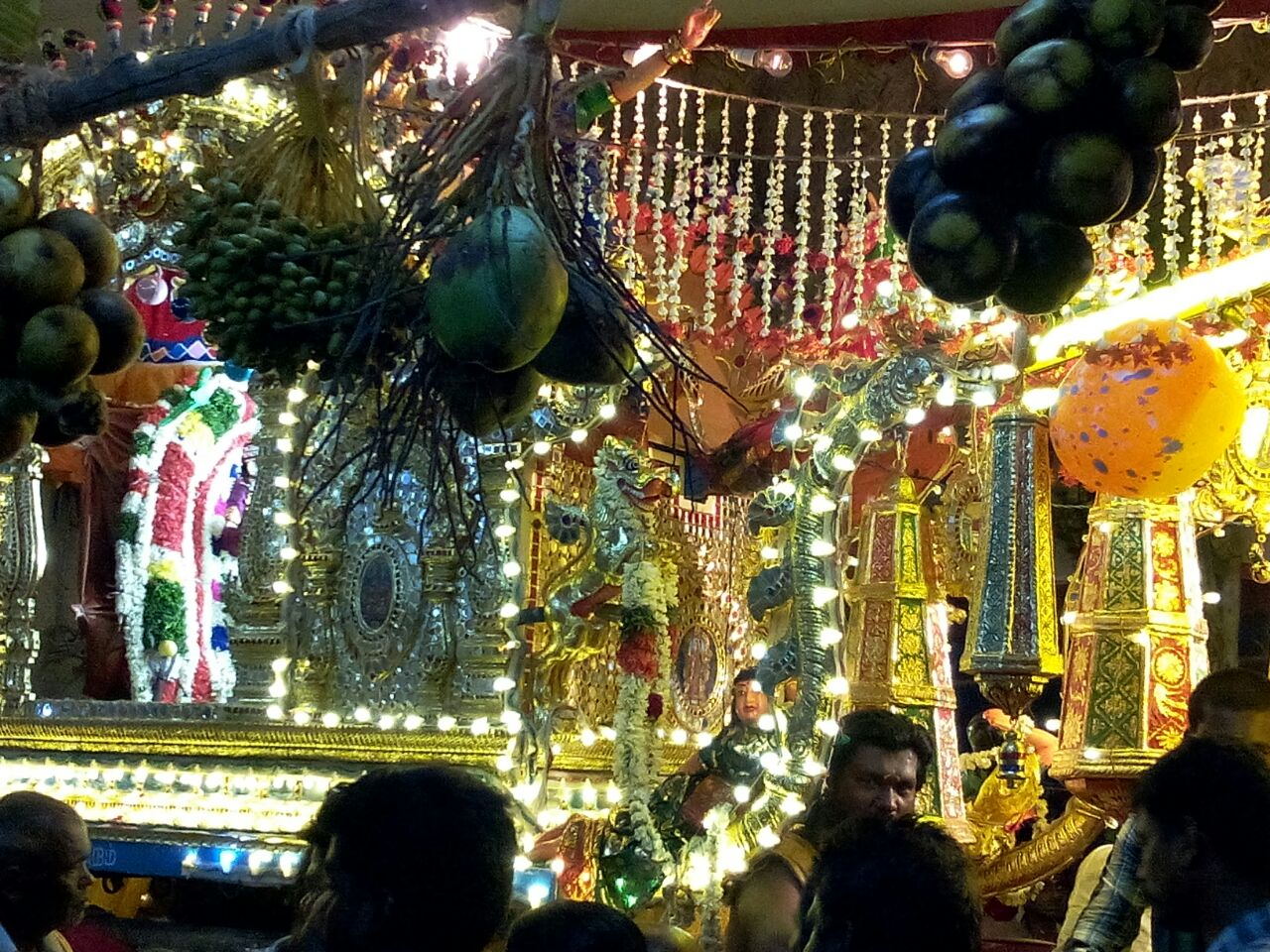
Pallaku

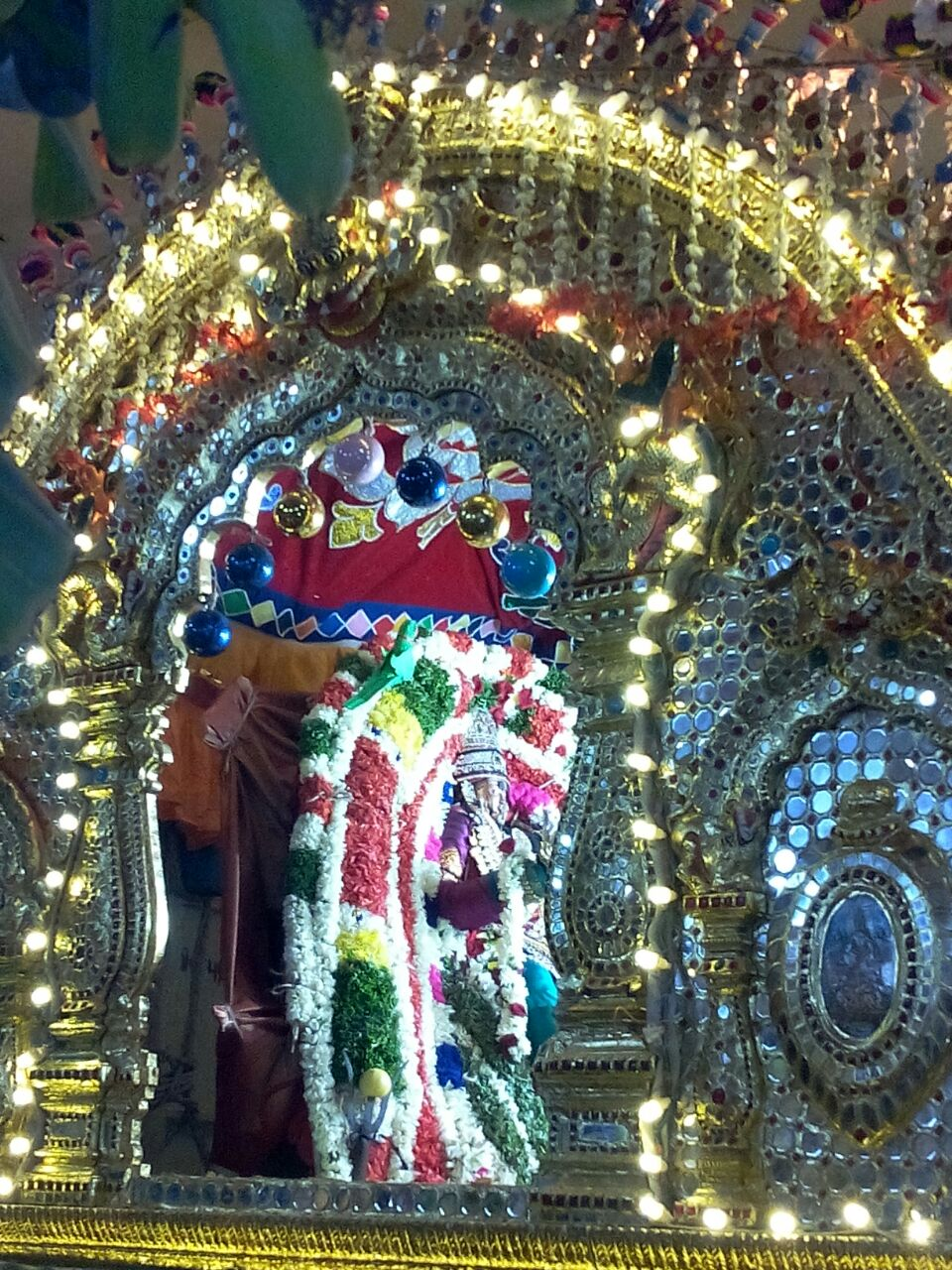
Pallaku
