= Sundararaja Perumal temple, Tiruchirapalli =

Vishnu temple in Tiruchirapalli, India

Sundararaja Perumal Temple
- Thiruanbil Temple
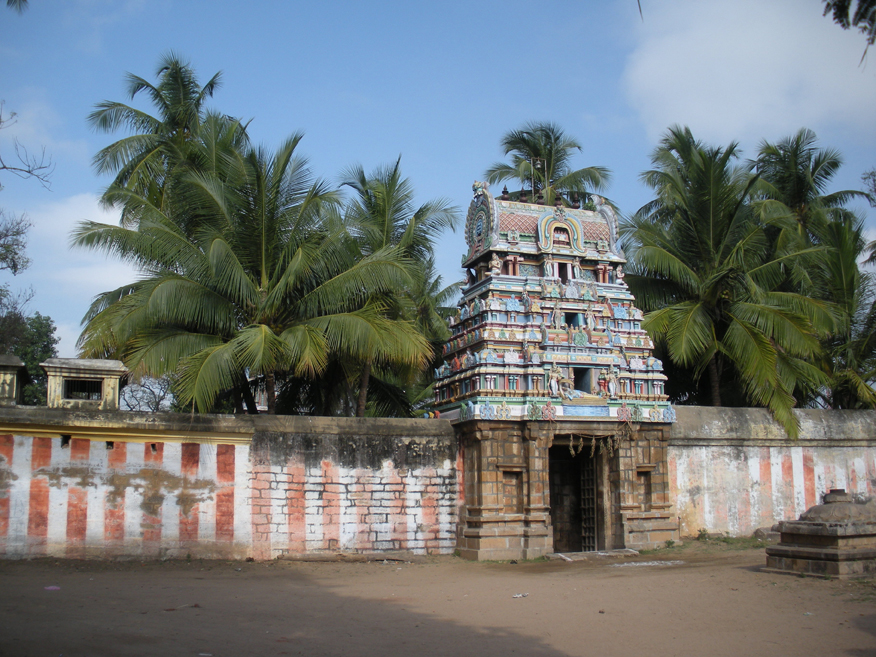

- Location in Tamil Nadu

Religion
- Affiliation: Hinduism
- District: Tiruchirapalli
- Deity: Sundararaja Perumal (Vadivazhagiya Nambi) (Vishnu); Sundaravalli Thayar (Lakshmi)
- Features: Tower: Tharaga Vimanam; Temple tank: Manduka Theertham

Location
- Location: Tamil Nadu, India
- State: Tamil Nadu
- Country: India
- Coordinates: 10.8678°N 78.8822°E

Architecture
- Type: Dravidian architecture
- Creator: Cholas

Thiru Anbil, or Sundararaja Perumal Temple (also called Vadivazhagiya Nambi Perumal Temple), in Anbil, a village in the outskirts of Tiruchirappalli in the South Indian state of Tamil Nadu, is dedicated to the Hindu god Vishnu. Constructed in the Dravidian style of architecture, the temple is glorified in the Naalayira Divya Prabandham, the early medieval Tamil canon of the Alvar saints from the 6th–9th centuries CE. It is one of the 108 Divya Desams dedicated to Vishnu, who is worshipped as Sundararajan and his consort Lakshmi as Sundaravalli.

The temple is believed to have been built by the Medieval Cholas of the late 8th century CE, with later contributions from Vijayanagara kings and Madurai Nayaks. The copper plate inscriptions from Anbil indicate generous contribution by the Chola kings to the temple. A granite wall surrounds the temple, enclosing all its shrines and bodies of water. The rajagopuram, the temple's gateway tower, is east facing and has a 3-tier structure. The temple is located on the banks of river Kollidam.

Sundararajan is believed to have appeared to Brahma (the Hindu god of creation) and sage Sutapa. Six daily rituals and two yearly festivals are held at the temple, of which the Tirthavari festival, celebrated during the Tamil month of Maasi (February–March), is the most prominent. The temple is maintained and administered by the Hindu Religious and Endowment Board of the Government of Tamil Nadu.

== Legend ==
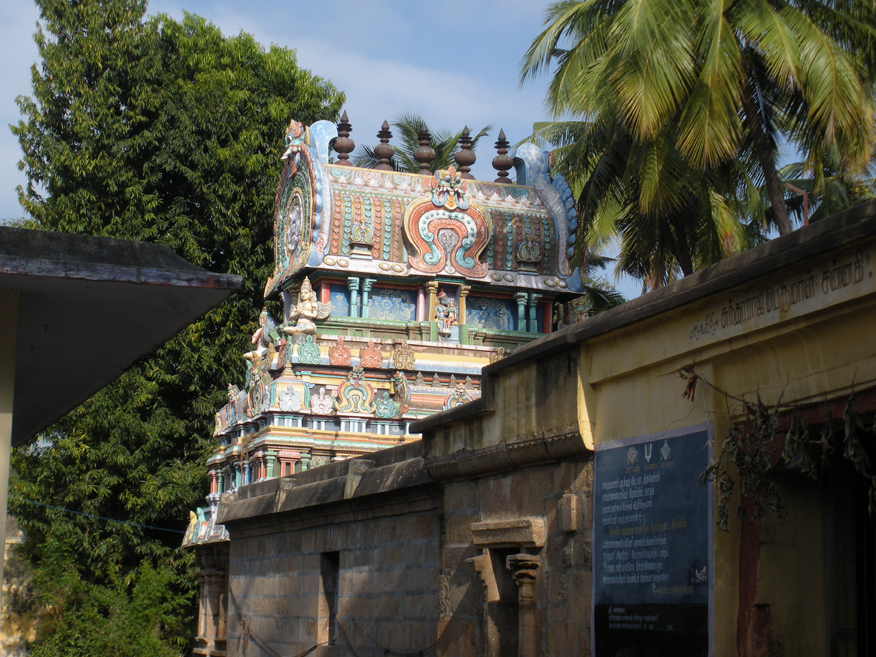
Tharaga Vimanam, the roof over the sanctum

As per Hindu legend, the sage Suthaba was doing penance under water at this place. As such, he did not observe that the sage Durvasa was waiting for him. The irritated Durvasa cursed Suthaba to become a frog (Mendaka). Suthaba requested Durvasa to relieve him of the curse. Durvasa explained to him that the curse was on account of the sin he had committed in his previous birth and the god Vishnu would free him. Suthaba, as a frog, continued his penance under water in the Mendaka Theertham in the temple and Vishnu appeared to him as Sundararajan.

As per another legend, the Hindu god of creation Brahma believed that he was the most handsome individual in the world as he created all the human beings. Vishnu learned this and cursed Brahma to be born as an earthly being. Brahma worshiped Vishnu for deliverance from the curse. Vishnu appeared as a handsome young man in front of him. Awed by the Vishnu's personality, Brahma inquired about him. Vishnu revealed his true form and conveyed to Brahma that physical appearance is temporary and one has to be good by heart.

== History and administration ==
The temple is located on the Northern bank of the river Kollidam, at a distance of 25 km (16 mi) from Trichy. King Sundara Chola, the ruler of the area, was a devotee of the temple. Upon his war victories, he donated immense wealth to this temple. His prime minister Anirudha Brahmarayar is believed to be from Anbil, the village where the temple is located. The copper plates from the Chola period from Anbil indicate generous contribution from the Medieval Cholas. The temple inscriptions indicate the legend of Vishnu appearing before sage Valmiki at this place.

The temple is maintained and administered by the Hindu Religious and Endowment Board of the Government of Tamil Nadu. An Executive officer appointed by the Board manages the temple along with Srirangam Ranganathaswamy temple, Pundarikakshan Perumal Temple at Thiruvellarai, Sri Alagiya Manavala Perumal Temple at Woraiyur and Mariamman Temple at Anbil. Annadhanam scheme, which provides free food to devotees, is implemented in the temple by the Board. Under the scheme, free food is offered to hundred devotees every day in the temple and the expenditure is fully funded by the contributions from devotees.

== Architecture ==
The main entrance of the temple faces the east and has a 3-tiered rajagopuram, the gateway tower. The main shrine has the image of the presiding deity Sundararaja Perumal (Vishnu) in reclining posture over his divine serpent Adisesha. The images of his consorts Sridevi (Lakshmi) and Bhudevi and Brahma are present in the sanctum. The festive image of Sundararajan - Vadivalagiya Nambi - is housed in the sanctum. The precinct around the sanctum houses the shrines of the twelve Alvars, Narasimha, Venugoplar, Lakshmi Narasimha (Lakshmi with Narasimha) and Hanuman. The structure of the roof over the sanctum is in the form of a gopuram, which is usually a feature in gateway tower. The front hall of the sanctum has a shrine for Andal in standing posture and has her bronze image in seated posture.

== Religious significance ==
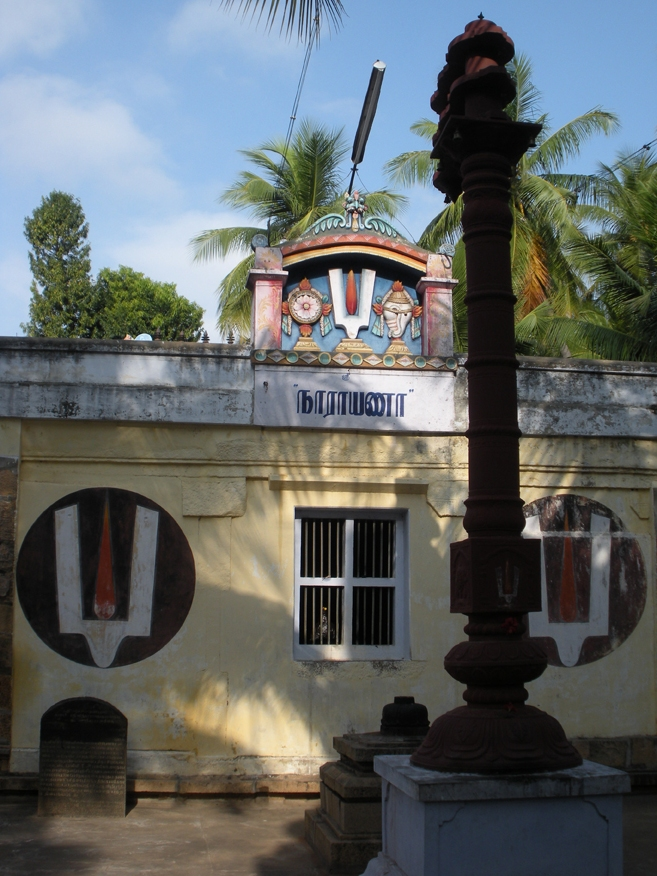
The temple mast found at the entrance of the temple

The temple is revered in Naalayira Divya Prabandham, the 7th–9th century Vaishnava canon, by Tirumalisai Alvar in two hymns. The temple is classified as a Divya Desam, one of the 108 Vishnu temples that are mentioned in the book. This temple is referred in a verse where the seven shrines featuring Vishnu in a reclining position - Tirukkudandai at Kumbakonam, Tiruvekkaa at Kanchipuram, Thiruevvul at Tiruvallur, Srirangam Rangathaswamy Temple, Tiruppernagar, Anbil and Tirupparkadal are mentioned. The temple is thronged by devotees praying for marriage. Special ablution is also performed for Andal seeking their wishes.

== Festival and religious practises ==
The temple priests perform the pooja (rituals) during festivals and on a daily basis. As at other Vishnu temples of Tamil Nadu, the priests belong to the Vaishnavaite community, a Brahmin sub-caste. The temple rituals are performed six times a day: Ushat-kalam at 7 a.m., Kalashanti at 8:00 a.m., Ucchi-kalam at 12:00 p.m., Sayarakshai at 6:00 p.m., Irandam kalam at 7:00 p.m. and Ardha Jamam at 8:00 p.m. Each ritual has three steps: alangaram (decoration), naivedyam (food offering) and dipa aradhanai (waving of lamps) for both Sundararajan and Sundaravalli. During the last step of worship, nadasvaram (pipe instrument) and tavil (percussion instrument) are played, religious instructions in the Vedas (sacred text) are recited by priests, and worshippers prostrate themselves in front of the temple mast. There are weekly, monthly and fortnightly rituals performed in the temple. The Tirthavari festival celebrated in the Tamil month of Maasi (February–March) and Vaikuntha Ekadashi celebrated during the Tamil month of Margazhi (December–January) are the major festivals celebrated in the temple.
