= Kallakudi =

- Panchayat town
- Location in Tamil Nadu, India Kallakudi (India)
- Coordinates: 10°58′36″N 78°57′09″E
- Country: India
- State: Tamil Nadu
- District: Tiruchirappalli

Population (2001)
  - Total: 11,625

Languages
  - Official: Tamil
- Time zone: UTC+5:30 (IST)

Kallakudi is a panchayat town in Tiruchirappalli district in the Indian state of Tamil Nadu.

== History ==
On 15 July 1953, the Dravida Munnetra Kazhagam (DMK) organised a demonstration in Kallakudi against naming the place as Dalmiapuram. A businessman named Ramakrishna Dalmia, from Bihar, established a cement factory in Kallakudi and the place was renamed Dalmiapuram on his request. DMK opposed the move as a suppression of South Indians by North India. It was the first notable demonstration by M Karunanidhi, the five-time Chief Minister of Tamil Nadu and his party, the DMK. The DMK party blocked goods trains during the protest.

The police opened fire on the demonstration killing two civilians and injuring 16 others. Twelve policemen were injured, including The Deputy Superintendent of Police and the Circle Inspector and ten other constables. The demonstration was the first notable demonstration by DMK and for M Karunanidhi who would go on to become the five-time Chief Minister of Tamil Nadu.

The government ordered an open judicial inquiry into the incident headed by the District Magistrate of Madurai and the Principal Subordinate Judge of Tuticorin. The judicial inquiries and later court proceedings led to Karunanidhi and the four others arrested getting sentenced to five months in prison and a fine of 35 Rupees on each. The demonstration was a part of Anti-Hindi agitations of Tamil Nadu, which has lasting political impact on Tamil Nadu.

== Demographics ==
As of 2001 India census, Kallakudi (கல்லக்குடி) had a population of 11,625. Males constitute 50% of the population and females 50%. Kallakudi has an average literacy rate of 83%, higher than the national average of 59.5%: male literacy is 86%, and female literacy is 80%. In Kallakudi, 11% of the population is under 6 years of age.

== Achievement ==
Kallakudi won the first prize for best town panchayat at Independence day awards 2021 by Government of Tamilnadu.
