= Lalgudi =

Town in Tiruchirappalli district, Tamil Nadu, India

Lalgudi Thiruthavathurai
- Town
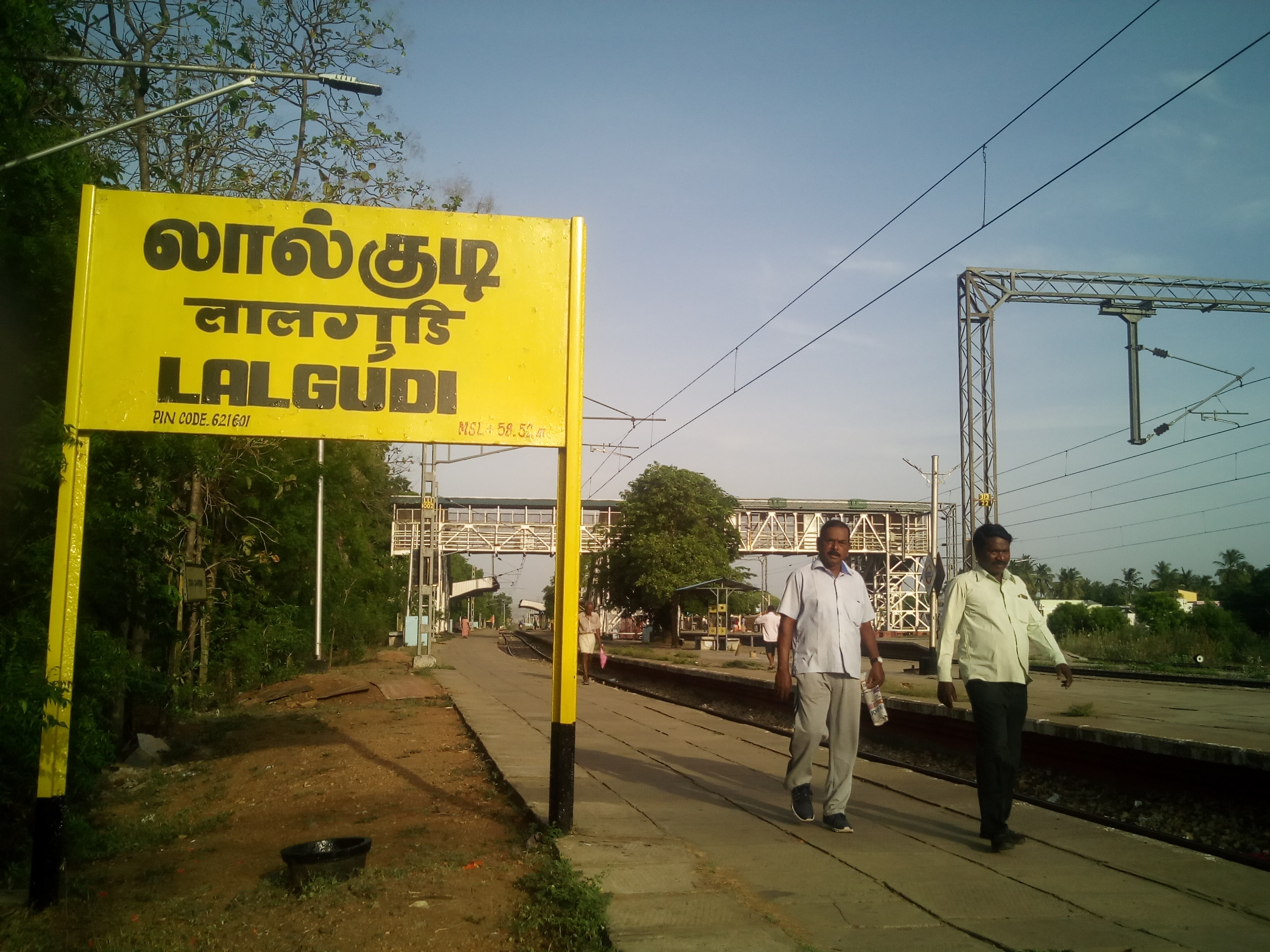

- Location in Tamil Nadu, India
- Coordinates: 10.8712°N 78.8197°E
- Country: India
- State, Region: Tamil Nadu, Chola Nadu
- District: Tiruchirapalli
- Division: Lalgudi division
- Taluk: Lalgudi taluk
- State Assembly Constituency: Lalgudi (1952 onwards)
- Lok Sabha Constituency: Perambalur since 2009
- Named after: red colour temple tower during 12th century

Government
  - Type: Town
  - Body: Municipality
- Elevation: 83.26 m (273.2 ft)

Population (2011)
  - Total: 23,740

Languages
  - Official: Tamil
- Time zone: UTC+5:30 (IST)
- PIN: 621601
- Telephone code: 0431
- Vehicle registration: TN-48

Lalgudi is a prominent town located in the Tiruchirapalli district of Tamil Nadu, India. This region has historical and cultural significance, serving as the administrative center for various divisions including Lalgudi taluk, Lalgudi Educational District, and Lalgudi DSP. Its importance stems from its governance structure, educational institutions, and constituency representation, as it has been part of the legislative assembly since 1952.

Known for its agricultural activities, Lalgudi benefits from fertile lands irrigated by the Cauvery River, making it a key region for rice and other crop cultivation. It is also known for traditional handicrafts and brassware production, contributing to the local economy.

== Etymology ==
The term lalgudi consists of two words – lal means "red" and gudi means "victory flag" in Hindi. Originally the place is called as "Thiruthavathurai" in Tamil which consists of 3 words - thiru - respect, thava - indicating saptharishis did thapas (thavam in tamil) on lord Shiva in this place, thurai - place. In short "place where thavam irundhanar". Hence the Shiva temple in this town is hailed as saptharishiswarar temple.

== Geography ==
Lalgudi is located around 20 km from Tiruchirapalli on NH-227 Tiruchirapalli-Chidambaram. Lalgudi lies close to the Kollidam River. Ayyan Vaikal is the river passing through Lalgudi Muthuvathur Aiyanar kovil (dalmiapuram near). The Shiva temple in lalgudi is called as Saptharisheeswarar temple which is known for worship for any delay in marriages. Thiruvadhirai is celebrated in the Tamil month Margazhi in this temple. There is a big temple car festival which is famous among the local residents. Anbil mahamariamman, Divya Desam 004, Thiru Vadivazhagiya Nambi (Sundararaja) Perumal Temple, Thiru Anbil are other famous temples in this town.

== Demographics ==
Historical population
| Year | Pop. | ±% |
|---|---|---|
| 1921 | 16,453 | — |
| 1931 | 9,376 | −43.0% |
| 1941 | 7,314 | −22.0% |
| 1951 | 12,742 | +74.2% |
| 1961 | 13,874 | +8.9% |
| 1971 | 16,122 | +16.2% |
| 1981 | 17,930 | +11.2% |
| 1991 | 19,917 | +11.1% |
| 2001 | 23,405 | +17.5% |
| 2011 | 23,740 | +1.4% |
Source: Government of India

Religion in Lalgudi at the 2011 census
1. Hinduism (76.9%)
2. Christianity (11.6%)
3. Islam (11.4%)
4. Sikhism (0.03%)
5. Buddhism (0.01%)
6. Other (0.07%)

=== Population ===
In 2011, the population of Lalgudi was 23,740, with 11,755 males and 11,985 females. This gives a sex ratio of 1,019 females per 1,000 males. The population of Lalgudi grew by 1.4% from 2001, when it had a population of 23,405. Children make up about 10% of the population. The literacy rate in Lalgudi is 91.9%, with the male rate at 95.3% and female rate at 88.63%. This is much higher than the average in Tamil Nadu, which is about 80%.

=== Religion ===
The biggest religion in Lalgudi is Hinduism, with about three-quarters of people in the town practicing it. Christianity and Islam are second, with both having about 11.5% of the population.

== Government and politics ==
Lalgudi assembly constituency is one of the original constituencies in the state of Tamil Nadu formerly known as madras state. (from 1952 onwards). From the year of 2009 Lalgudi Constituency is part of Perambalur (Lok Sabha constituency).

== Economy ==
Lalgudi is surrounded by many villages in which Agriculture is the main business. Rice, Banana, lentils crops done throughout the year which gain main economy to Lalgudi town.

== Transport ==
=== By air ===
The nearby airport is Tiruchirapalli International Airport just 25–30 km from the town of lalgudi.

=== By rail ===
Through a rail network the town is well connected with major cities like Chennai, Tiruchirapalli, Madurai, and Dindigul, and towns like Ariyalur, Srirangam, Villupuram, and Cuddalore.

=== By road ===
Every two minutes there is a regular bus which connects the town with the intra-city terminal of its district headquarters (Chathiram bus stand) otherwise (main guard gate). And there is regular buses to reach the towns of Perambalur, Ariyalur, Jayankondam, Chidambaram, Thiruvaiyaru, Cuddalore, Puducherry and some buses to reach the cities like Thanjavur, Chennai, Dindigul, Tirupur Karur, Madurai, and Coimbatore. The town connects with the nearby villages, with numerous town and mini buses.

== Education ==
The town of Lalgudi heads the Educational District of Lalgudi which comprises the taluks of Lalgudi and Manachanallur. The government-operated Lalgudi Boys Higher Secondary School and the Management-operated Girls Higher Secondary School, Don Bosco school manakkal are major schools at which most of the rural boys and girls study. Other schools include Panchayat Union Middle School, St. Anne's Primary Convent, St. Anne's Girls High school, Government Elementary Schools near Omakulam (near the police station, 1st cross - Paramasivapuram, Nannimangalam), Lions Mat Higher Secondary School, Sri Vivekananda Matriculation School for the past 28 years. Government Boys Higher Secondary School is more than 100 years old.

A majority of students pursue higher education only at Tiruchirapalli due to lack of standard institutions in Lalgudi. "Agricultural Engineering College and Research Institute" (AEC&RI) affiliated with Tamil Nadu Agricultural University (TNAU) is functioning in Kumulur village in an area of 300 acres 4 km near to Lalgudi offering B.Tech. Agricultural Engineering.

There is also a polytechnic college in Lalgudi - Mandhurai, Don Bosco private Industrial training Institute, Lalgudi-Manakkal to provide technical studies. Mmany students travel to Trichy city every day by train to pursue their college education. A government arts & science college (Bharathidasan University College) was opened in Paramasivapuram fourth cross and now it has shifted to Kumulur village.

== Notable residents ==
- M. Gopala Krishna Iyer, poet, translator, essayist, dramatist, and editor
- Lalgudi Jayaraman, violinist
- La Sa Ra (Lalgudi Saptarishi Ramamirtham), writer
