= Geography of Tiruchirappalli =

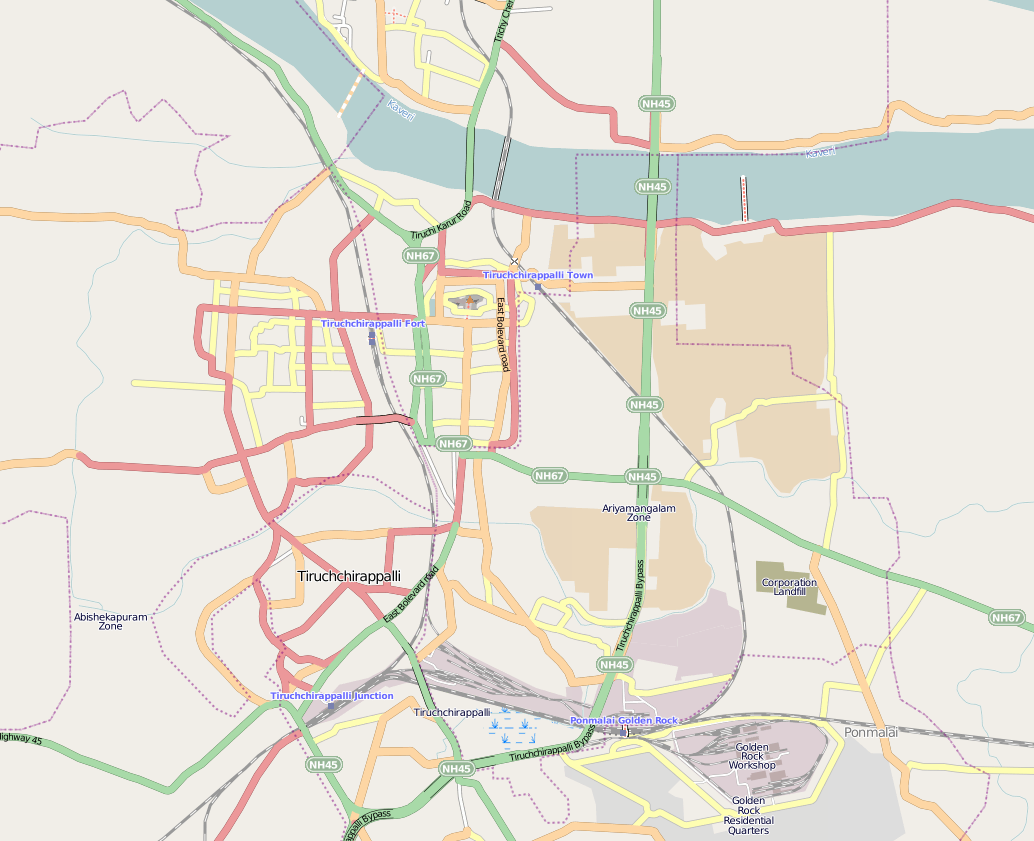
Map of Tiruchirappalli

Tiruchirappalli (Tamil: திருச்சிராப்பள்ளி (tiruccirāppaḷḷi) (spelled Trichinopoly in the records of British India), also called Tiruchi or Trichy (Tamil: திருச்சி), is a city in the Indian state of Tamil Nadu and the administrative headquarters of Tiruchirapalli District. It is the fourth largest municipal corporation in Tamil Nadu and also the fourth largest urban agglomeration in the state. It is located almost at the geographic centre of the state.

== Location ==
Tiruchirappali is located at 10.8050°N 78.6856°E. The city is at a distance of 325 kilometres (202 mi) south-west of Chennai and 402 kilometres (250 mi) north of Kanniyakumari on the National Highway NH 45 and 200 kilometres (120 mi) south-east of Coimbatore and 128 kilometres (80 mi) west from the Bay of Bengal coast, The city of Madurai is situated 161 kilometres (100 mi) south of Tiruchirappalli.

== Topology ==
The topology of Tiruchirappalli is almost flat with a few isolated hillocks rising above the surface, the highest of which is the Rockfort. The average elevation is 289 feet (88 m). The city spread over an area of 146.7 square kilometres (56.6 sq mi) is situated on the plains between the Shevaroy Hills to the north and the Palni Hills to the south and south-west. The city is situated at the head of the Cauvery Delta which commences 16 kilometres (9.9 mi) west of Tiruchirappalli where the Cauvery River branches into two streams forming the island of Srirangam.

A belt of cretaceous rock known as the Trichinopoly Group lies to the north of the city. It commences from the banks of the Kaveri River and extends northwards gradually thinning before joining another belt of cretaceous rock known as the Ariyalur Group. Both the northern and southern corners of the Trichinopoly Group rests on a layer of gneiss.

== Divisions ==
The city is divided into three parts: The Cantonment area to the south, the temples to the north and the bazaar in the center of the city. Most of Tiruchirapalli's hotels and government and post offices are situated in the cantonment while most of Tiruchirapalli's temples are located in the north. The Rockfort and its temple are situated in the centre of the city and surrounded by a bazaar.

The earliest political divisions of the city were into the Cantonment and the city. The Cantonment was situated one and a half miles to the south of the city and was bounded by Uraiyur to the north and Tennur, Yeddatharavu and Beemanaickenpalaiyam to the south. As of 1866, the town had a population of 57,177 while the Cantonment had a population of 19,375. Currently, Tiruchirappalli is divided into four administrative zones: Srirangam, Ariyamangalam, Golden Rock and Abhishekapuram, which are further sub-divided into 60 wards.

The city along with suburban areas such as Pappankurichi, Thiruverumbur, Koothappar, Krishnasamudram, Thuvakudi, Navalpattu, Manachanallur and Bikshandarkoil form the urban agglomeration of Tiruchirappalli.

== Climate ==
During the summer months of March to May, Tiruchirappalli is extremely hot and dry during daytime. However, the evenings are rendered cool by cold winds that blow from the south-east. It is quite sultry during September and October but cool and pleasant from November to February. According to a popular saying, the climate of Tiruchirappalli is "eight months hot and four hotter." The city receives an average annual rainfall of 83 centimetres (33 in)

== Civic amenities ==
The city gets its drinking water supply from five headworks on the Cauvery River and 1,470 bore wells linked to 60 service reservoirs in and around the city. There are a total of 286 slums in Tiruchirappalli with a population of about 162,000.
