= Vairichettipalayam =

Panchayat Town in Tamil Nadu, India

Vairichettipalayam வைரிசெட்டிபாளையம்
- Panchayat town
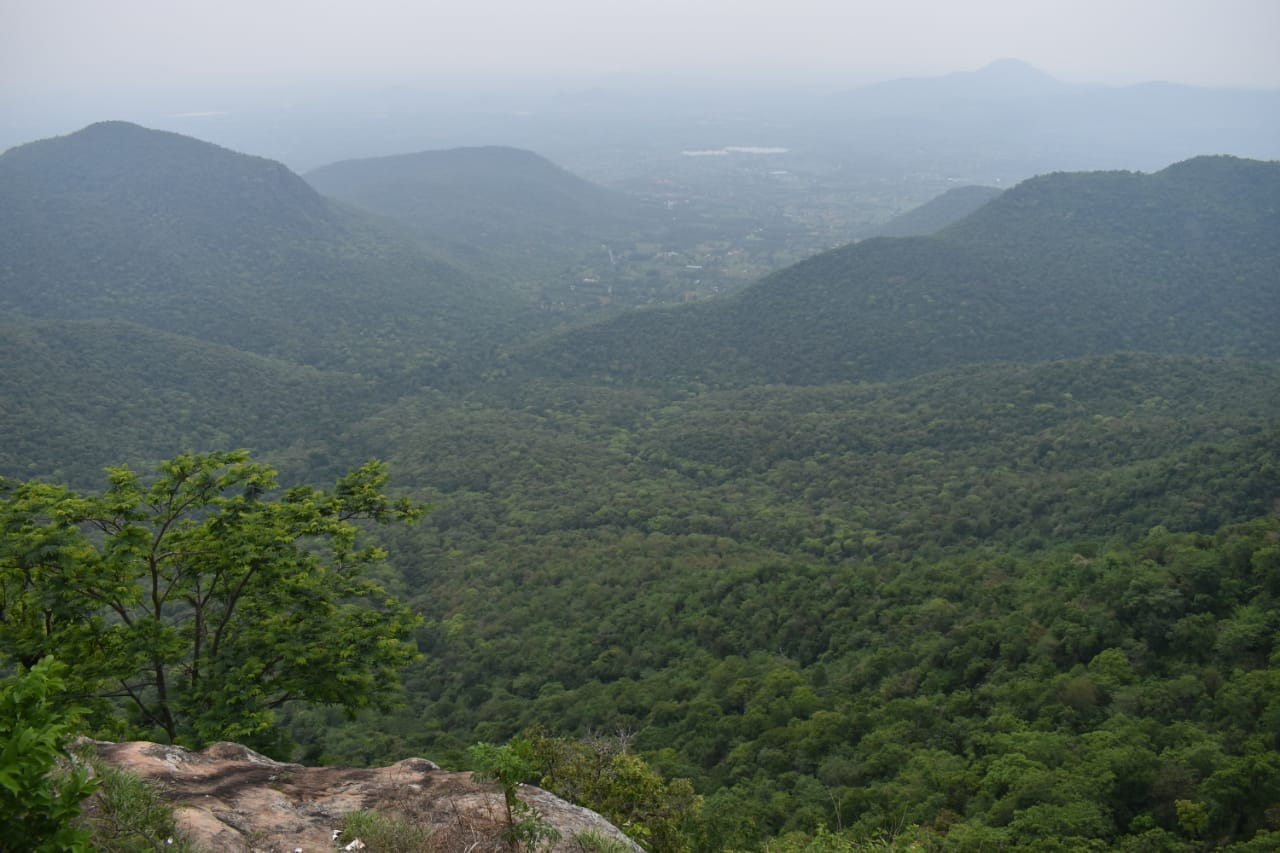
- Pasarikombai for Kollimalai

- Location in Tamil Nadu, India Vairichettipalayam (India)
- Coordinates: 11.27°N 78.52°E
- Country: India
- State: Tamil Nadu
- District: Tiruchirappalli
- Taluk: Thuraiyur
- Region: Kongu Nadu
- Founder: Tiruchirappalli City Municipal Corporation

Government
  - Type: Nagar Panchayat
  - Body: Local government in Tamil Nadu

Population (2021)
  - Total: 8,831

Languages
  - Official: Tamil
- Time zone: UTC+5:30 (IST)
- Postal code: 621012
- Vehicle registration: TN-48 Srirangam division
- Website: Vairichettipalayam Panchayat town

Vairichettipalayam is a panchayat town and Reserved forest area in Musiri division and Thuraiyur taluk in Tiruchirappalli district, Tamil Nadu, India. It is famous for the Masi Periyannasamy Temple.

== Transport ==
Vairichettipalayam is well connected by road to cities like Thuraiyur, Tiruchirappalli, Namakkal, Musiri, Thathaiyangarpet. In addition to the main bus routes, mini buses play an important role in connecting town within the hinterland. The nearest railway station is located in Tiruchirappalli. The nearest airport is Tiruchirappalli International Airport which offers international and domestic flights.

== Government and politics ==
Thuraiyur (state assembly constituency) is a separate assembly constituency falling under Perambalur (Lok Sabha constituency).

== List of areas in Vairichettipalayam ==
- Pasarikombai
- Sukkalampatti kombai
- Sengampatti kombai
- Erikadu
- South street
- North street
- East street
- Kalvi nagar
- perumal kovil street
- Reddyar street
- kattukotai
- Naidu street
- Kalipatti street
