= Tiruchirappalli metropolitan area =

Greater Tiruchirappalli Tiruchirappalli Metropolitan Area
- Metropolitan area
- Nickname: Rock Fort City
- Country: India
- State: Tamil Nadu
- Planning Authority: Tiruchirappalli Urban Development Authority (TUDA)
- Seat: Tiruchirappalli
- Districts: parts of Tiruchirappalli district

Government
  - Type: Municipal Corporation
  - Body: TCMC

Area
  - Metropolitan area: 300 km^{2} (120 sq mi)
  - Metro: 167.23 km^{2} (64.57 sq mi)

Population
  - Metro: 1,181,912 (2,011 census)
- Demonym: Thiruchikaran
- Time zone: UTC+5:30 (IST)
- Vehicle registration: TN-45 (West), TN-48 (Srirangam) & TN-81 (East)
- Website: www.trichycorporation.gov.in

The Greater Tiruchirappalli or Tiruchirappalli Metropolitan Area, is the 51st largest urban agglomeration in India and is the fourth largest metropolitan city in the state of Tamil Nadu next to Chennai, Coimbatore, Madurai. The Tiruchirappalli Metropolitan Area consists of the city of Tiruchirappalli and its suburbs in Tiruchirappalli district.

== Municipal corporations ==
1. Tiruchirappalli City Municipal Corporation

== Municipalities ==
1. Thuvakudi

== Districts ==
1. Tiruchirappalli district (partial)

== Taluks ==
From Tiruchirapalli district

1. Manachanallur (partial)
2. Srirangam
3. Tiruchirappalli East
4. Tiruchirappalli West
5. Thiruverumbur (partial)
6. Lalgudi (partial)

== Transport ==
The Regional Transport offices in the Tiruchirappalli metropolitan area are TN-45 (Tiruchirappalli West), TN-48 (Srirangam), TN-81 (Tiruchirappalli East).

== See also ==
- Chennai metropolitan area
- Coimbatore metropolitan area
- Madurai metropolitan area
- Salem metropolitan area
- List of million-plus urban agglomerations in India
- List of districts in Tamil Nadu by Human Development Index
