= Puthanampatti =

Neighbourhood in Tiruchirappalli district, Tamil Nadu, India

Puthanampatti புத்தனாம்பட்டி
- Village
- Country: India
- State: Tamil Nadu
- District: Tiruchirappalli
- Taluk: musiri

Population (2001)
  - Total: 3,163

Languages
  - Official: Tamil
- Time zone: UTC+5:30 (IST)
- PIN: 621 007
- Telephone code: 04327
- Sex ratio: 1021 ♂/♀

Puthanampatti is a village in Musiri block and Musiri taluk, Tiruchirappalli district of Tamil Nadu, India.

== Etymology ==
Puthanampatti was formerly known as "Punathai". From 1 September 2018, the taluk (township) was changed from Musiri to Thuraiyur.

== History ==
One historical event that defines Puthanampatti is the building of a government-aided arts and science college in 1967. This college was called Nehru Memorial College, it is an autonomous college affiliated to Bharathidasan University, also located in Puthanampatti. The college is recognized by the University Grants Commission (India) under Sec 2(f) and 12(B) of the UGC Act, 1956.

In 1967, Puthanampatti covered Thuraiyur, Perambalur, Ariyalur, Jeyamkondam, Musiri, Lalgudi, Mannachanallur, Karur (combined Trichy district) and Thammampatti, Athur, Vazhapadi in Salem dist, Chinna Selam, Kallakurichi, Sangarapuram, Moongilthuraipattu, Ulundurpet in Villupuram dist, Thozhudur, Thittagudi, Pennadam, Virudhachalam, Neyveli in Cuddalore district. Now it covers mainly Thuraiyur and Mannachanalur taluk.

The latitude 11.0665807 and longitude 78.6867964 are the geo coordinate of the Puthanampatti. Chennai is the state capital for Puthanampatti village. It is located around 285.1 kilometer from Puthanampatti. The other nearest state capital from Puthanampattiti is Pondicherry and its distance is 158.0 km. The other surrounding state capitals are Pondicherry (158.0 km)., Bangalore (244.9 km), Thiruvananthapuram (333.2 km).

== Temples ==
- SHRI MAHA MARIYAMMAN TEMPLE, THENUR ROAD.
- MAAVADI KARUPU KOVIL, THENUR ROAD.
- PUTHU KARUPU KOVIL, TRICHY ROAD
- KALLIYADI KARUPU - SHRI SEEYALAMMAN TEMPLE, THURAIYUR ROAD.

== Road Directions ==
=== From Trichy district headquarters ===
1. TRICHY - TOLLGATE - SAMAYAPURAM - SIRUGANUR -EDUMALAI - VELLAKALPATTI -PUTHANAMPATTI (NH45)

2. TRICHY - TOLLGATE - NOCHIYAM - MANNACHANALLUR- THIRUVELLARAI -OMANDUR - PUTHANAMPATTI (SH 62)

3. TRICHY - TOLLGATE - NOCHIYAM - MANNACHANALLUR- PERAMANGALAM -OMANDUR - PUTHANAMPATTI (SH 62)

4. TRICHY - TOLLGATE - NOCHIYAM - MANNACHANALLUR- S.AYYAMPALAIYAM-THATHTHAMANGALAM- -VELLAKALPATTI-PUTHANAMPATTI (MDR244)

5. TRICHY - TOLLGATE - SAMAYAPURAM - 94.KARIYAMANIKKAM - VELLAKKALPATTI - PUTHANAMPATTI (NH45)

=== From Thuraiyur Taluk headquarters ===
1. THURAIYUR B.S - SORATHUR - MUTHIYAMPALAIYAM - NADUVALUR -PUTHANAMPATTI.

2. THURAIYUR B.S - KALIPATTI - MUTHIYAMPALAIYAM - NADUVALUR -PUTHANAMPATTI.

3. THURAIYUR B.S - KARATTAMPATTI - ILLUPAIYUR - PUTHANAMPATTI ( FAST LANE)

4. THURAIYUR B.S - ADIVARAM - KOTTATHOOR - PUTHANAMPATTI

5. THURAIYR B.S - ADIVARAM - KEELA KUNNUPATTI - KOTTATHOOR -PUTHANAMPATTI.

=== Nearest district - Perambalur ===
1. PERAMBALUR - CHETTIKULAM - PERAKAMBI - EDUMALAI - PUTHANAMPATTI

2. PERAMBALUR -CHETTIKULAM - THENUR - PUTHANAMPATTI - SHORTEST DISTANCE.

=== From National Highway NH45 ===
1. SANAMANGALAM -EDUMALAI -PUTHANAMPATTI.

2. SIRUGANOOR - THIRUPATOOR - -EDUMALAI -PUTHANAMPATTI.

3. M.R.PALAIYAM - THIRUPATOOR - -EDUMALAI -PUTHANAMPATTI.

EAST DIRECTION : PERAMBALUR

WEST DIRECTION : MUSIRI

NORTH DIRECTION : THURAIYUR

SOUTH DIRECTION : TRICHY.

NEAREST RAILWAY STATION : SRIRANGAM - SRGM (30 KILOMETERS)

NEAREST MAJOR RAILWAY STATION : TIRUCHIRAPPALLI - TPJ (38 KILOMETERS)

NEAREST AIRPORT : TIRUCHIRAPPALI AIRPORT - TRZ (40 KILOMETERS)

NEAREST COASTAL AREA : BOOMBUGAR - CAUVERY POOM PATINAM

NEAREST HOLY RIVER : CAUVERY RIVER (30 KILOMETERS)

==== Nearest holy places ====
1. TRICHY THAYUMAANAVAR TEMPLE - ROCKFORT PILLAIYAR TEMPLE

2. SRIRANGAM - RANGANATHA SWAMY TEMPLE

3. THIRUVANAIKOVIL TEMPLE

4. SAMAYAPURAM MARIAMMAN TEMPLE

5. VAYALUR MURUGAN TEMPLE

6. CHURCH - TRICHY MAIN GUARD GATE

7. MOSQUE - MADURAI ROAD MOSQUE

8. MOSQUE - PULIVALAM, TRICHY TO THURAIYUR MAIN ROAD.

9. MOSQUE - T.KALATHUR

== Demographics and geography ==
As of 2001 India census, Puthanampatti had a population of 2756. Males constitute 50% of the population and females 50%. Puthanampatti has an average literacy rate of 78%, higher than the national average of 59.5%: male literacy is 85%, and female literacy is 75%. In Puthanampatti, 13% of the population is under 6 years of age.

Puthanampatti is located about 36 km away from the Rock City - Trichy in North West, about 18 km away from Thuraiyur in South East and about 32 km away in South West from Perambalur.
