= Musiri (disambiguation) =

Musiri is a town in Tamil Nadu, India.

Musiri may also refer to:

- Musiri block
- Musiri taluk
- Musiri division
- Musiri (state assembly constituency)
