= Kattuputhur =

- Panchayat town
- Location in Tamil Nadu, India, [south Asia] Kattuputhur (India)
- Coordinates: 10.9833°N 78.2333°E
- Country: India
- State: Tamil Nadu
- District: Tiruchirappalli
- Taluk: Thottiyam
- Established: 1908

Government
  - Type: Nagar Panchayat
  - Body: Local government in Tamil Nadu
- Elevation: 102 m (335 ft)

Population (2001)
  - Total: 11,115

Languages
  - Official: Tamil
- Time zone: UTC+5:30 (IST)
- PIN: 621207
- Telephone code: 04326

Kattuputhur is a Panchayat town in the Thottiyam taluk Tiruchirappalli district of the Indian state of Tamil Nadu. The town sits at an altitude of 102 metres (335 ft).

== Population ==
The 2001 Census of India reported that Kattuputhur had a population of 11,115 (5,546 male and 5,569 female). Around 10% (1058 individuals) of the population was under one year old (552 male and 536 female).

== Industry ==
The main occupational sector in the town is agriculture. Kattuputhur has some of the most fertile lands in the Kaveri delta of Tamil Nadu. Rice and bananas are grown alternately throughout the year, reliant on water from the Kaveri delta, mainly flowing 3 km (1.9 mi) from Kattuputhur. Water from the Kaveri delta is made available to Kattuputhur and surrounding villages through canals branching out from the main river.

Many small canals provide water for the agriculture-dependent inhabitants. The Mayanur Check Dam south of Kattuputhur was built for irrigation purposes.

The nearest Railway Station is Mayanor. The town has a bus stop, police station, government hospital, library, and a number of banks including Lakshmi Vilas Bank, Indian Overseas Bank, Trichy District Central Co-Operative Bank, Kattuputhur Co-Operative Bank, and the State Bank of India. The Kattuputhur branch of the State Bank of India had the town's first ATM.

Kattuputhur has a primary health center.

Internet and telecommunication service providers that cover the area include BSNL, Airtel, Aircel, Reliance, Vodafone, Tata Docomo, and Idea.

== Transport ==
Travel to Kattuputhur may done by bus, taxi, or car. Kattuputhur is connected to nearby towns such as Trichy, Karur, Chennai, and Namakkal via government or private buses. Salem and Trichy are equidistant to Kattuputhur.

== Temple ==
Prasanna Venkatesa, a Hindu temple dedicated to Lord Vishnu, is located at Kattuputhur village near Thiru Narayana Puram in the Trichy District of Tamil Nadu. The presiding Deity of the temple is Prasanna Venkatesa Perumal with Sridevi and Bhoodevi Thaayars. The Temple is around 300 years old.
