= Uppiliapuram =

- panchayat town
- Location in Tamil Nadu, India Uppiliapuram (India)
- Coordinates: 11.27°N 78.52°E
- Country: India
- State: Tamil Nadu
- District: Tiruchirappalli
- Taluk: Thuraiyur
- Elevation: 194 m (636 ft)

Population (2001)
  - Total: 6,697

Languages
  - Official: Tamil
- Time zone: UTC+5:30 (IST)

Uppiliapuram (also spelt as Uppiliyapuram) is a panchayat town in Thuraiyur taluk, Tiruchirappalli district in the Indian state of Tamil Nadu.

== Geography ==
Uppiliyapuram is located at 11.27°N 78.52°E. It has an average elevation of 194 m (636 ft).

== Demographics ==
As of 2001 India census, Uppiliapuram had a population of 6697. Males constitute 50% of the population and females 50%. Uppiliapuram has an average literacy rate of 65%, higher than the national average of 59.5%: male literacy is 74%, and female literacy is 55%. In Uppiliapuram, 10% of the population is under 6 years of age.

== Politics ==
Thuraiyur assembly constituency (ST) is part of Perambalur (Lok Sabha constituency).
