= Tiruchirappalli division =

Revenue in Tiruchirapalli Of Tamil Nadu

Tiruchirappalli division is a revenue division in the Tiruchirapalli district of Tamil Nadu, India. It comprises the taluks of Tiruchirappalli West taluk, Tiruchirappalli East taluk, Thiruverumbur taluk.
