= M. Ravisankar =

Indian politician (born 1985)

Deputy Speaker of Tamil Nadu Legislative Assembly
- Incumbent
- Assumed office 12 May 2026
- Speaker: J. C. D. Prabhakar
- Chief Minister: C. Joseph Vijay
- Preceded by: K. Pitchandi

Member of the Tamil Nadu Legislative Assembly
- Incumbent
- Assumed office 6 May 2026
- Preceded by: S. Stalinkumar
- Constituency: Thuraiyur

Personal details
- Born: Manachanallur, Tamil Nadu, India
- Party: Tamilaga Vettri Kazhagam
- Parent: P. Muthu (father)
- Education: National College, Tiruchirappalli (Class 12); MIET (Diploma in Electronics and Electrical Engineering)
- Occupation: Politician, Electrician

Muthu Ravisankar (born 1985) is an Indian politician from Tamil Nadu. He currently serves as the 15th Deputy speaker of Tamil Nadu Legislative Assembly since 2026. He is a member of the Tamil Nadu Legislative Assembly from the Thuraiyur Assembly constituency, which is reserved for Scheduled Caste community in Tiruchirappalli district, representing the Tamilaga Vettri Kazhagam.

== Early life and education ==
Ravisankar is from Manachanallur, Tiruchirappalli district, Tamil Nadu. He is the son of P. Muthu. He studied E. R. Higher Secondary School, Mela Chintamani, Tiruchirappalli and passed Class 10 in 2000 and completed Class 12 at National College. He later did a Diploma in Electronics and Electrical Engineering at MIET, also in Trichy from 2003 to 2006. He works as an electrician. He declared assets worth Rs.11 lakhs in his affidavit to the Election Commission of India.

== Career ==
Ravisankar became an MLA for the first time winning the Thuraiyur Assembly constituency representing Tamilaga Vettri Kazhagam in the 2026 Tamil Nadu Legislative Assembly election. He polled66,263 votes and defeated his nearest rival, E. Saroja of the All India Anna Dravida Munnetra Kazhagam, by a margin of 9,614 votes.

== Controversies ==
On 08 November 2026, a resident of Tiruchirappalli district, alleged Ravi Shankar, the deputy speaker of Tamil Nadu assembly and MLA, assaulted him when he approached the legislator over drinking water shortages and garbage accumulation in his neighbourhood. A video purportedly showing the MLA kicking and chasing resident away circulated on social media, triggering criticism of the legislator. However, the following day, on 9 November 2026, resident appeared in a video alongside Ravi Shankar and withdrew his allegations, stating that there had been only pushing and shoving in a crowd and that the incident had been misrepresented on social media.
