= M.Karuppampatti =

M.Karuppampatti karuvai
- village
- Location in Tamil Nadu, India M.Karuppampatti (India)
- Coordinates: 11.1681059538°N 78.4251524071°E
- Country: India
- State: Tamil Nadu
- District: Tiruchirappalli

Government
  - Type: State
  - Body: DMK

Area
  - Total: 4 km^{2} (1.5 sq mi)
  - Rank: 1

Population
  - Total: 2,342
  - Density: 590/km^{2} (1,500/sq mi)

Languages
  - Official: Tamil
- Time zone: UTC+5:30 (IST)
- Postal code: 621210

M.Karuppampatti is a village in Tiruchirappalli district, Musiri Taluk, Thathaiyangarpet union, Mettupalayam, Tiruchirappalli town panchayat in the Indian state of Tamil Nadu.

== Administration Authorities ==
- Mettupalayam, Tiruchirappalli Town panchayat
- Thathaiyangarpet Panchayat Union
- Musiri Taluk
- Tiruchirapalli District
- Tamil Nadu
- India

== Facilities available ==
- Government Child care
- Government Preliminary School
- Library
- Agriculture Co-operative Society
- Preliminary Health Assistant Center
- Branch Post Office

== Economy ==
- Majority of the people (90%) are small scale farmers and farm labours.
- Government officials (2%)

== Transport ==
Several bus connections are available.

== Government Sponsored ongoing project ==
- Tamil Nadu Afforestation Project (Japan Aided)
