= Eragudi =

Village in Tamil Nadu, India

Erakudi
- Village
- Location in Tamil Nadu, India Erakudi (India)
- Coordinates: 11°11′16″N 78°30′14″E
- Country: India
- State: Tamil Nadu
- District: Tiruchirappalli
- Taluk: Thuraiyur
- Elevation: 194 m (636 ft)

Population (2011)
  - Total: 6,697

Languages
  - Official: Tamil
- Time zone: UTC+5:30 (IST)

Eragudi is a village in Thuraiyur taluk in Tiruchirappalli district in the Indian state of Tamil Nadu.

== Demographics ==
According to 2011 census, Eragudi had a population of 6472 with a sex-ratio of 1,032 females for every 1,000 males, much above the national average of 929.[3] A total of 487 were under the age of six. The average literacy of the town was 58.96%, compared to the national average of 72.99%.[3] The town had a total of : 4826 households. There were a total of 396 workers, 5280 main
agricultural labourers.

== Economy ==
Most people in Eragudi were employed in the agriculture sector. Paddy and corn are the predominant crops grown in the area. Currently, the economy of this town is based on agricultural products.

Eragudi is one of the very few towns in Tamil Nadu to have a high grade water management system. During the Monsoon, rain water from the nearby hills fill the lakes used to irrigate the surrounding agricultural lands. When the lake reaches its maximum level, safety valves are opened to drain the excess water into the neighbouring temple tank through an underground canal.

== Transport ==
Eragudi is well connected by road to cities like Thuraiyur, Trichy, Namakkal, Musiri, Karur, and Attur . In addition to the main bus routes, mini buses play an important role in connecting village within the hinterland. The nearest railway station is located in Trichy. The nearest airport is Tiruchirappalli International Airport which offers international and domestic flights.

== Culture ==
Periyasamy temple, situated in Puliyancholai, is the most prominent temple in the town. The temple is located at the bottom of Kollihills, which lies 3640 ft below from kollimalai hills, 29 km from Thuraiyur in Tiruchirappalli district. The site is accessible via a roadway.
