= Madurai metropolitan area =

Greater Madurai Madurai Metropolitan Area
- Metropolitan area
- Nickname: Athens of the East
- Country: India
- State: Tamil Nadu
- Planning Authority: Madurai Urban Development Authority (MUDA)
- Seat: Madurai
- Districts: parts of Madurai District

Government
  - Type: Municipal Corporation
  - Body: MCMC

Area
  - Metropolitan area: 1,254.93 km^{2} (484.53 sq mi)
  - Metro: 147.97 km^{2} (57.13 sq mi)

Population
  - Metro: 2,263,115 (2,011 Census)
- Demonym: Maduraikaran
- Time zone: UTC+5:30 (IST)
- Vehicle registration: TN-58 (South), TN-59 (North) & TN-64 (Central)
- Website: maduraicorporation.co.in

The Greater Madurai or Madurai Metropolitan Area, is the 17th largest metropolitan area in India and is the third largest metropolitan area in the state of Tamil Nadu only next to Chennai and Coimbatore. The Madurai Metropolitan Area consists of the city of Madurai and its suburbs in Madurai district.

== Composition ==
The Madurai urban agglomeration is a metropolitan area in Tamil Nadu state, consisting of the city of Madurai and its suburbs. It consists of a municipal corporation and suburban areas spread out in parts of Madurai district.

== Municipal corporations ==
1. Madurai City Municipal Corporation

== Municipalities ==
1. Tirumangalam
2. Melur
3. Usilampatti

== Town Panchayats ==
1. Vadipatti
2. Paravai
3. Sholavandan

== Census Towns ==
1. Kannanendal
2. Melamadai
3. Chinna Anuppanadi
4. Nagavakulam

== Districts ==
1. Madurai district (partial)

== Taluks ==
From Madurai district

1. Madurai-North (partial)
2. Madurai-South
3. Melur (partial)
4. Thirumangalam (partial)
5. Thiruparankundram
6. Vadipatti (partial)

== Transport ==
The Regional Transport offices in the Madurai metropolitan area are TN-58 (Madurai South), TN-59 (Madurai North), and TN-64 (Madurai Central).

== Madurai Metro Rail ==
In 2021, the Tamil Nadu Government proposed a metro for the city of Madurai.

== See also ==
- Chennai metropolitan area
- Coimbatore metropolitan area
- Salem metropolitan area
- Tiruchirappalli metropolitan area
- List of million-plus urban agglomerations in India
- List of districts in Tamil Nadu by Human Development Index
- List of million-plus urban agglomerations in Tamilnadu
