= Mettupalayam, Tiruchirappalli district =

Coordinates: 11°10′29″N 78°26′33″E

Mettupalayam Mettupalayam
- panchayat towntrichy
- Interactive map of Mettupalayam
- Country: India
- State: Tamil Nadu
- District: Tiruchirappalli
- Taluk: Musiri

Government
  - Type: Town Panchayat
  - Body: Local government in Tamil Nadu

Population (2001)
  - Total: 7,538

Languages
  - Official: Tamil
- Time zone: UTC+5:30 (IST)
- Area code: 04326(XXXXXX)
- Vehicle registration: TN-48 Srirangam Division

Mettupalayam is a panchayat town in Musiri taluk, Tiruchirappalli district in the Indian state of Tamil Nadu.

== Demographics ==
As of 2001 India census, Mettupalayam had a population of 7538. Males constitute 50% of the population and females 50%. Mettupalayam has an average literacy rate of 70%, higher than the national average of 59.5%: male literacy is 79%, and female literacy is 60%. In Mettupalayam, 9% of the population is under 6 years of age.

M.Karuppampatti, Thevarayapatti, Konangipatti, Moruppatty, Ganapathy Nagar, AmaravathySalai, MuthuRajaPalayam, Eluppur, and Salakkadu villages are administered under Mettupalayam Town panchayat

== Tourist Places ==
=== Puliyancholai ===
A scenic spot on the foothills of Kolli Hills located 10 km from Mettupalayam. Puliyancholai is well known for greenish trees and tamarind groves. This forest region is cool and green with added attraction of the stream. The stream is the natural bathing area for the tourists throughout the year. There is a waterfall in the higher hills which is called Akaya Gangai, Besides, the water here has medicinal value. The 18th day of the Tamil month 'Adi' is the time for worshiping the river here and more people visit Puliyancholai that day. Accommodation of two resorts and one Dormitory Building are available here. Puliyancholai to Agaya Gangai Falls (Hill top) is five hours hard Trek. One can have fantastic views of prehistoric curved rocks, Dolmens, Pithukkuli Cave, forest produces on the way and at the top plain- honey, guava, orange, mustard, fenugreek, garlic, paddy, maze, millets, jackfruits etc. Other than Puliyancholai, is also located near to Mettupalayam.
