= Nehru Memorial College, Puthanampatti =

Autonomous arts and science college in Tiruchirapalli district

Nehru Memorial College
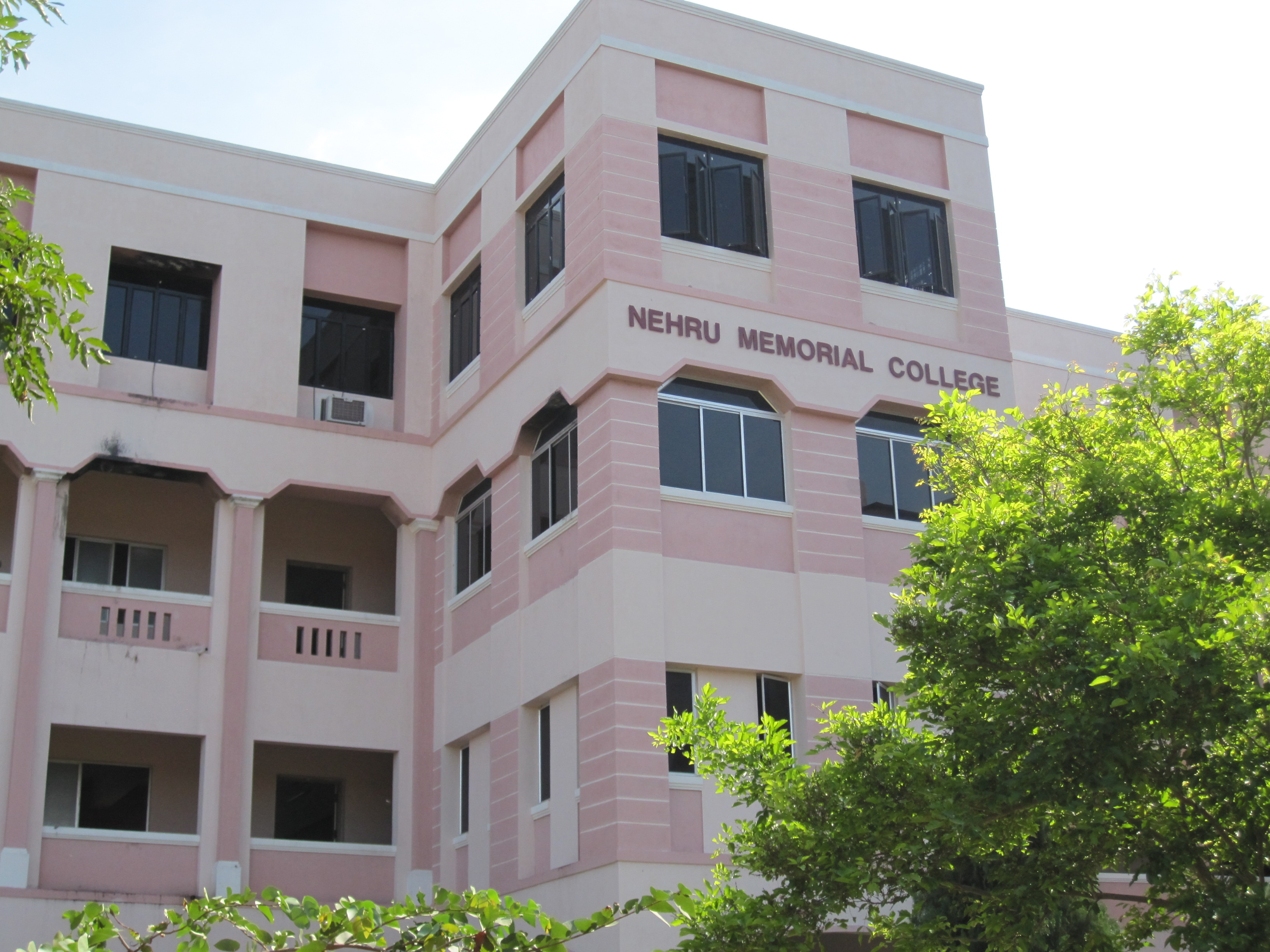
- Motto: Knowledge, Justice and Peace
- Type: Private - Government-aided
- Established: 1967
- Principal: Dr. A. Venkatesan
- Location: Trichy, Tamil Nadu, India
- Website: www.nmc.ac.in

Nehru Memorial College, Puthanampatti is an autonomous college affiliated to Bharathidasan University in Puthanampatti, Trichy, Tamil Nadu. The college is recognized by the University Grants Commission (India) under Sec 2(f) and 12(B) of the UGC Act, 1956.

The college offers numerous undergraduate and postgraduate courses besides research & doctoral studies in various disciplines with a special focus on information technology.

The college is a trendsetter in introducing B.Sc Computer Science in the Arts and Science Colleges at national level as early as 1983 along with St.Joseph College, Trichy.

The first institution to introduce Data Science programs in the Bharathidasan University affiliated colleges during the academic year 2017-2018.

== History ==
The college was established in 1967 by the Philanthropist Shri M. Mooka Pillai and inaugurated by the then Chief Minister of Tamil Nadu, Dr. C. N. Annadurai.

== Departments ==
NMC Puthanampatti has 15 departments.

- Tamil
- Biotechnology
- Botany
- Business Administration
- Chemistry
- Commerce
- Computer Science
- Data Science
- Economics
- English
- Hotel Management
- Mathematics
- Physics
- Zoology
- Embedded Systems

== Programmes ==
University Grants Commission has approved two year Post Graduate Degree Programme M.Sc Embedded Systems from the academic year 2012-2013. The University Grants Commission sanctioned Rs 43.5 lakhs towards strengthening Laboratory Facilities.

== Events ==
Year	Event
1967	Nehru Memorial College is established by Shri M. Mooka Pillai and inaugurated by the then Chief Minister of Tamil Nadu, Dr. C. N. Annadurai.
1983	Commencement of Post Graduate Programs for the first time.
1983	We become the first to introduce B.Sc. Computer Science in the Southern districts of Tamilnadu.
2000	Department of Commerce is recognized as a Research centre by Bharathidasan University
2001	Department of Physics is recognized as a Research centre by Bharathidasan University
2004	University Grants Commission (India) has granted Autonomous status
2005	Department of Zoology is recognized as a Research centre by Bharathidasan University
2010	Department of Science and Technology (India), FIST has sanctioned 35.5 lacs to Department of Physics to strengthen it's laboratory facilities [DST -FIST]
2012	University Grants Commission (India) has sanctioned M.Sc Embedded System as an innovative Programme
2013	Department of Computer Science is recognized as a Research Centre by Bharathidasan University
2013	Re-Accreditation by National Assessment and Accreditation Council with "A" Grade
2015	The college has expanded its course offerings to include a Bachelor of Education (B.Ed.) Programme
2017	The college has introduced a cutting-edge program, Master of Science (M.Sc.) in Data Science.
2019	Nehru Memorial College Commemorates 50 Glorious Years of Education. Grand Golden Jubilee Observance.
2019	A State-of-the-Art Research Block was established to enhance research activities, promote research excellence and to attract more research scholars.
2019	DST - FIST (College)
2022	The College was Nationally Reaccredited with "A+" grade by National Assessment and Accreditation Council in Second Cycle.

== Physical facilities and infrastructure ==
=== Land and building ===
- Land Area (in Acres): 35 Acres 75 cent
- Built up Area: 22390.87 Sqmt
- Play ground / Sports / Games Area: 15 Acres

=== Teaching / Learning ===
- Number of Class Rooms: 69
- Number of Tutorial Rooms: 67
- Number of Laboratories: 09
- Number of Seminar Rooms: 02
- Number of Conference Rooms: 02
- Number of Committee Rooms: 01

=== Hostel facilities ===
- Number of Seats in Boys Hostel: 600
- Number of Seats in Girls Hostel: 1500

=== Library ===
- Seating Capacity of Library Reading Room: 72 + 15
- Number of Books in the Library: 50500
- Number of Journals Subscribed: 72
- Number of Multimedia Literature: 05

=== ICT Infrastructure ===
- Number of PCs in Computer Centre: 350
- Number of PIV or higher OCs: 5 Servers
- Number of LAN Terminals: 350
- Wi-fi Connectivity: Yes
- Type and Speed of Internet Connectivity: 1 GBPS

== Location ==
The college is situated around 30 km from Trichy and 15 km from Thuraiyur. The nearest domestic airport, the international airport and the railway junction are located at Trichy about 45 km from Puthanampatti.
