= Balakrishnampatti =

- Panchayat Town
- Location in Tamil Nadu, India Balakrishnampatti (India)
- Coordinates: 11°15′4″N 78°28′25″E
- Country: India
- State: Tamil Nadu
- District: Tiruchirappalli
- Taluk: Thuraiyur

Population (2001)
  - Total: 8,596

Languages
  - Official: Tamil
- Time zone: UTC+5:30 (IST)

Balakrishnampatti is a Panchayat town in Thuraiyur taluk, Tiruchirappalli District in the state of Tamil Nadu, India.

== Demographics ==
At the 2001 India census, Balakrishnampatti had a population of 8596. Males constituted 49% of the population and females 51%. Balakrishnampatti had an average literacy rate of 62%, higher than the national average of 59.5%; with 57% of the males and 43% of females literate. 11% of the population were under 6 years of age.
