= Musiri division =

Revenue division in Tamil Nadu, India

- Revenue Division
- country: India
- state: Tamil Nadu
- District: Tiruchirappalli
- region: chola Nadu
- Zone: Central

Languages
  - Official: Tamil
- Time zone: UTC+5.30
  - Summer (DST): IST
- PIN: 620 xxx
- Telephone: 04327
- ISO 3166 code: [[ISO 3166-3:IN|]]
- Vehicle registration: TN-48

Musiri division is a revenue division in the Tiruchirapalli district of Tamil Nadu, India. It comprises the taluks of Musiri, Thottiyam and Thuraiyur.
