= Manamedu Trichy =

Manamedu
- Village
- Manamedu, Tiruchirapalli, Tamil Nadu
- Coordinates: 10°58′25.7″N 78°23′18.2″E
- Country: India
- State: Tamil Nadu
- District: Trichy
- Elevation: 116.24 m (381.4 ft)

Population (2011)
  - Total: 2,813

Languages
  - Official: Tamil, Telugu
- Time zone: UTC+5:30 (IST)
- PIN: 621209
- Telephone code: +914326xxxxxx
- Sex ratio: 50% ♂/♀

Manamedu is a village in Thottiyam taluk in the district of Tiruchirapalli (Trichy) with population of roughly 13,500 people. Land ruling community saliyar are land lord and powerful ruling community in Manamedu. It is one of 27 villages in Thottiyam Block along with villages like Alagarai and Mullipadi which lies on the banks of Cauvery River and it is peculiar for banana cultivation, especially one of the banana variety, the "rasathaali". Main source of income of this population is agriculture and hand loom weaving. Poverty level is intense despite their traditional weaving of hand loom voile.

The Tamil Nadu Wakf board says that 8 villages in Tiruchirapalli, including Manamedu, belong to it and the land owners in Manamedu are astonished by this announcement.

== People and lifestyle ==
The main occupation of People living here is Agriculture and Handloom Weaving. Having approximately 3000 men and 1500 women weavers with average earning of US$ 1.35 per day for a family. depending availability of work. They have mastery on handloom weaving of finer yarn. Products manufactured by them are fine and of good quality specially meant for Indian traditional Sarees but lack of demand in Indian market due to import of polyester autoloom fabrics and yarns has made them to suffer. They now survive mainly because of exports of home furnishings.

Mediator (master weaver) plays important role in procuring and sending back to the exporters or other buyers. His role is to collect dyed yarn and distribute to weavers and send back fabric to the customer. Mainly wage rate is based on the demand and supply but involvement of master weaver most of the times make sure that weaver does not earn more than the earlier wage.

Almost all houses in Manamedu have one long, rectangular room with an elevated platform and a thari, the in-house handloom machine. Once a thriving handloom centre, Manamedu has deteriorated from the nearly 400 handlooms it supported even a decade ago into around 127 looms.

The Manamedu Saliyar Handloom Weaver Cooperative Production and Sales Society is a two-roomed office that manages Manamedu’s handloom production, worth around 12 lakh a year. It is through this society that co-optex outsources its weaving work to traditional handloom weavers like P. Meganathan. Co-optex pays the weavers Rs.840 every 10 days when they collect the finished pieces. "Nowadays, many handloom weavers have closed down their looms to take up jobs offered under the MNREGS program, or at construction sites, where they earn more." Though the industry witnessed an export boom post 2000, the demand hit rock bottom in 2006 when several export orders were redirected to China.
