= Pettavaithalai =

Pettavaithalai Tiruchirappalli District
- Panchayat town
- Location in Tamil Nadu, India
- Coordinates: 10.90°N 78.58°E
- Country: India
- State: Tamil Nadu
- Named for: Pettavaithalai

Area
  - Total: 10 km^{2} (3.9 sq mi)
  - Rank: Panchayath

Population (2011)2021
  - Total: 10,000
  - Density: 10/km^{2} (26/sq mi)

Languages
  - Official: Tamil, English
- Time zone: UTC+5:30 (IST)
- Postal code: 639112
- Vehicle registration: TN48 Srirangam

Pettavaithalai is a panchayat town in Srirangam taluk Tiruchirappalli district in the Indian state of Tamil Nadu.

== History ==
Balu Mahendra shot his 1979 film Aziyatha Kollangal in 27 days at Pettavaithalai, Sirugamani and Inungoor for Rs 8 lacs.

== Geography ==
Pettavaithalai is by the river Cauvery and this is the takeoff point for the Uyyakondan canal which is the major irrigation canal for the fertile lands in Trichy district.

== Demographics ==
=== Languages ===
The native language of Pettavaithalai is Tamil

== Government and politics ==
Pettavaithalai is part of Srirangam (state assembly constituency) in Tiruchirappalli District of Tamil Nadu State in India.

== Transport ==
=== By Air ===
Trichirapalli International Airport.

Pettavaithalai's nearest airport is Tiruchirapalli International Airport situated at 30.2 km distance. Few more airports around Pettavaithalai are Tiruchirapalli International Airport 30.2 km. Thanjavur Air Force Station 72.6 km. Salem Airport 109.0 km.

=== By Rail ===
Pettavaithalai Railway station.

The nearest railway station to Pettavaithalai is Pettavaithalai which is located in and around 4.0 kilometer distance.

=== By Road ===
Pettavaithalai bus stand.

The distance from Pettavaithalai to Trichy is 24 km and Pettavaithalai to Karur is 54 km.

== Education ==
Government higher secondary school Pettavaithalai 500 m K.r.r. Nursery & Primary School, Pettavaithalai 2.4 km Rathna Higher Secondary School Pettavaithalai 4.4 km.

Sevai Shandhi matriculation school, Pettavaithalai 5 km. Cabriyal metriculation school, palancovery 1 km. Government high school, Dhevasdhanam 3 km.
