= Tamil Nadu Planning Commission =

Indian governmental institution

Tamil Nadu State Planning Commission

Agency overview
- Jurisdiction: Tamil Nadu
- Agency executives: M. K. Stalin Chairman of TNSPC (CM of Tamil Nadu); Dr J Jeyaranjan Vice Chairman of TNSPC
- Parent agency: Government of Tamil Nadu
- Website: spc.tn.gov.in

The Tamil Nadu State Planning Commission is an institution in the Government of Tamil Nadu.

== See also ==
- Planning Commission (India)
- Investment commission of India
- Five-Year Plans of India
- Ministry of Finance, Government of India
- Finance Commission of India
