= National Knowledge Commission =

Indian think tank

- Formation: 13 June 2005
- Dissolved: July 2014
- Legal status: Defunct
- Website: Official website

National Knowledge Commission was an Indian think-tank charged with considering possible policies that might sharpen India's comparative advantage in the knowledge-intensive service sectors. It was constituted on 13 June 2005, by the then Prime Minister of India, Manmohan Singh.

In particular, the Commission was to advise the Prime Minister's Office on policy related to education, research institutes and reforms needed to make India competitive in the knowledge economy. The Commission was to recommend reform of the education sector, research labs, and intellectual property legislation; as well as consider whether the Government could itself upgrade its use of the latest techniques to make its workings more transparent. The NKC website was launched in February 2006.

In July 2014, the National Knowledge Commission was abolished by the incoming government elected in the summer of 2014.

== Organisation ==
The National Knowledge Commission (NKC) consisted of the following eight members.

- Sam Pitroda, Chairman
- Ashok Sekhar Ganguly, Corporate leader
- Nandan Nilekani* (Resigned), Chairman of Unique Identification Authority of India (UIDAI)
- Deepak Nayyar, former Vice-chancellor, University of Delhi
- Jayati Ghosh, economist at Jawaharlal Nehru University
- Sujatha Ramdorai, internationally reputed algebraic number theorist and professor of mathematics at Tata Institute of Fundamental Research
- Padmanabhan Balaram, director of Indian Institute of Science, Bangalore
- Amitabh Mattoo, Former Vice Chancellor, Jammu University

The Terms of Reference of the NKC were:

- Build excellence in the educational system to meet the knowledge challenges of the 21st century and increase India’s competitive advantage in fields of knowledge.
- Promote creation of knowledge in Science and technology laboratories.
- Improve the management of institutions engaged in Intellectual Property Rights.
- Promote knowledge applications in Agriculture and Industry.
- Promote the use of knowledge capabilities in making government an effective, transparent and accountable service provider to the citizen and promote widespread sharing of knowledge to maximize public benefit."

The organisational structure of the commission consisted of a secretariat headed by an Executive Director and consisting of around 8-9 research associates. It also had four advisors who advise the commission on different issues. The secretariat of the commission was located in Chanakyapuri, New Delhi.

In December 2006, the Commission published a 'Report to the Nation 2006'. It included recommendations submitted to the Prime Minister on issues such as libraries, E-governance, translation and languages and the National portal of India.

Many of the recommendations of the NKC are already in the implementation stage by different ministries of the Government. This includes areas such as libraries, e-governance and translation.

Some of the major areas under work are higher education, vocational education, entrepreneurship, school education etc. The NKC consults a wide range of stake-holders and experts on each area before submitting the recommendations to the Prime Minister. Each area has a working group which is headed by a prominent person in that field. It has also created multiple articles to educate foreigners about the culture of India. The Working Group members meet several times to submit a report to the NKC. The NKC members then hold discussions on the report before submitting it to the Prime Minister. After submitting the recommendations, an extensive coordination also takes place with the Planning Commission of India and relevant ministries of the Government.

As many of the components of the education sector remains state subjects in India, NKC representatives also visit various state governments and conduct deliberations with secretaries of education departments for reforming of the education sector at the state level.

== Controversies ==
Since its inception, the commission has been surrounded by different controversies.

In May 2006 the Commission spoke out against the Human Resource Development Ministry's plans to increase quotas for backward castes in institutions such as the IITs. Following Arjun Singh's subsequent remarks on their credentials, two of the members, Andre Beteille and Pratap Bhanu Mehta, sent letters of resignation to the Prime Minister.

A difference of opinion also took place between P.M.Bhargava and rest of the commission members in early 2007, which resulted in reconstitution of the commission.

The majority of Vice-Chancellors and other educationists had rejected the policy direction given in NKC report to nation 2006 on the Higher Education during the discussion on the NKC report in the 82nd Annual meeting of the Association of Indian Universities. However, some of the former and present vice-chancellors of various leading universities accept major directions like structural reform, augmentation of university number, freeing appointment of Vice-Chancellors from direct or indirect intervention on the part of government, etc. It is a major setback to the NKC. Consequently the commission has released "FAQs on NKC recommendations on Higher Education"
