= Prasanna Venkatachalapathi Temple, Thuraiyur =

Perumal temple in Tiruchirapalli district, Tamil Nadu, India

Prasanna Venkatachalapathi Temple is a Perumal temple situated on the top of a hill called Perumalmalai, located at about 3 km from Thuraiyur in Tiruchirappalli district, Tamil Nadu, India. The presiding deity is the Hindu god Vishnu. The temple is believed to have been constructed by the grandchildren of Karikala, who are worshipped here.
