= Badepalli, Karnataka =

Badepalli
- village
- Location in Karnataka, India Badepalli (India)
- Coordinates: 16°34′22″N 077°22′15″E
- Country: India
- State: Karnataka
- District: Yadgir
- Taluka: Yadgir
- Gram panchayat: Ajlapur

Government
  - Type: Panchayat raj
  - Body: Gram panchayat

Population (2001)
  - Total: 3,027

Languages
  - Official: Kannada
- Time zone: UTC+5:30 (IST)
- ISO 3166 code: IN-KA
- Vehicle registration: KA
- Website: karnataka.gov.in

Badepalli is a village in the southern state of Karnataka, India. Administratively, Badepalli is under Ajlapur gram panchayat, Yadgir Taluka of Yadgir District in Karnataka. Badepalli is 10 km by road south of the village of Madhawar, and 14 km by road east of the town of Saidapur, where Narayanpet Road Station is the nearest railway station.

== Demographics ==
As of 2001 India census, Badepalli had a population of 3,027 with 1,497 males and 1,530 females.

== See also ==
- Yadgir
