= Ujjelli =

- Village
- Location within Telangana Location within India
- Coordinates: 16°34′09″N 077°26′41″E
- Country: India
- State: Telangana
- District: Narayanpet district
- Mandal: Maganoor

Population (2001)
  - Total: 1,400

Languages
  - Official: Telugu
- Time zone: UTC+5:30 (IST)
- Vehicle registration: TG

Ujjelli is a panchayat village in the southern state of Telangana, India. Administratively, Ujjelli is under Maganoor Mandal of Narayanpet district in Telangana. The village of Ujjelli is 3.5 km by road southeast of the village of Azalapur, Karnataka, and 17 km by road north of the village of Maganoor.

There are two villages in the gram panchayat: Ujjelli and Bhairampalle.

== Demographics ==
At the 2001 census, the village of Ujjelli had 1,400 inhabitants, with 701 males and 699 females. 15% of the population was below the age of six.
