= S. Stalinkumar =

Indian politician

Member of the Tamil Nadu Legislative Assembly
- In office 19 May 2016 – 4 May 2026
- Preceded by: T. Indragandhi
- Constituency: Thuraiyur

Personal details
- Party: Dravida Munnetra Kazhagam

S. Stalinkumar is an Indian politician who is a Former Member of Legislative Assembly of Tamil Nadu. He was elected from Thuraiyur as a Dravida Munnetra Kazhagam candidate in 2016 and 2021.

== Elections contested ==
Election	Constituency	Party	Result	Vote %	Runner-up	Runner-up Party	Runner-up vote %	Ref.
2021 Tamil Nadu Legislative Assembly election	Thuraiyur	DMK	Won	50.37%	T. Indragandhi	AIADMK	37.71%	
2016 Tamil Nadu Legislative Assembly election	Thuraiyur	DMK	Won	48.10%	A. Maivizhi	AIADMK	43.33%	
