= List of districts in Tamil Nadu by Human Development Index =

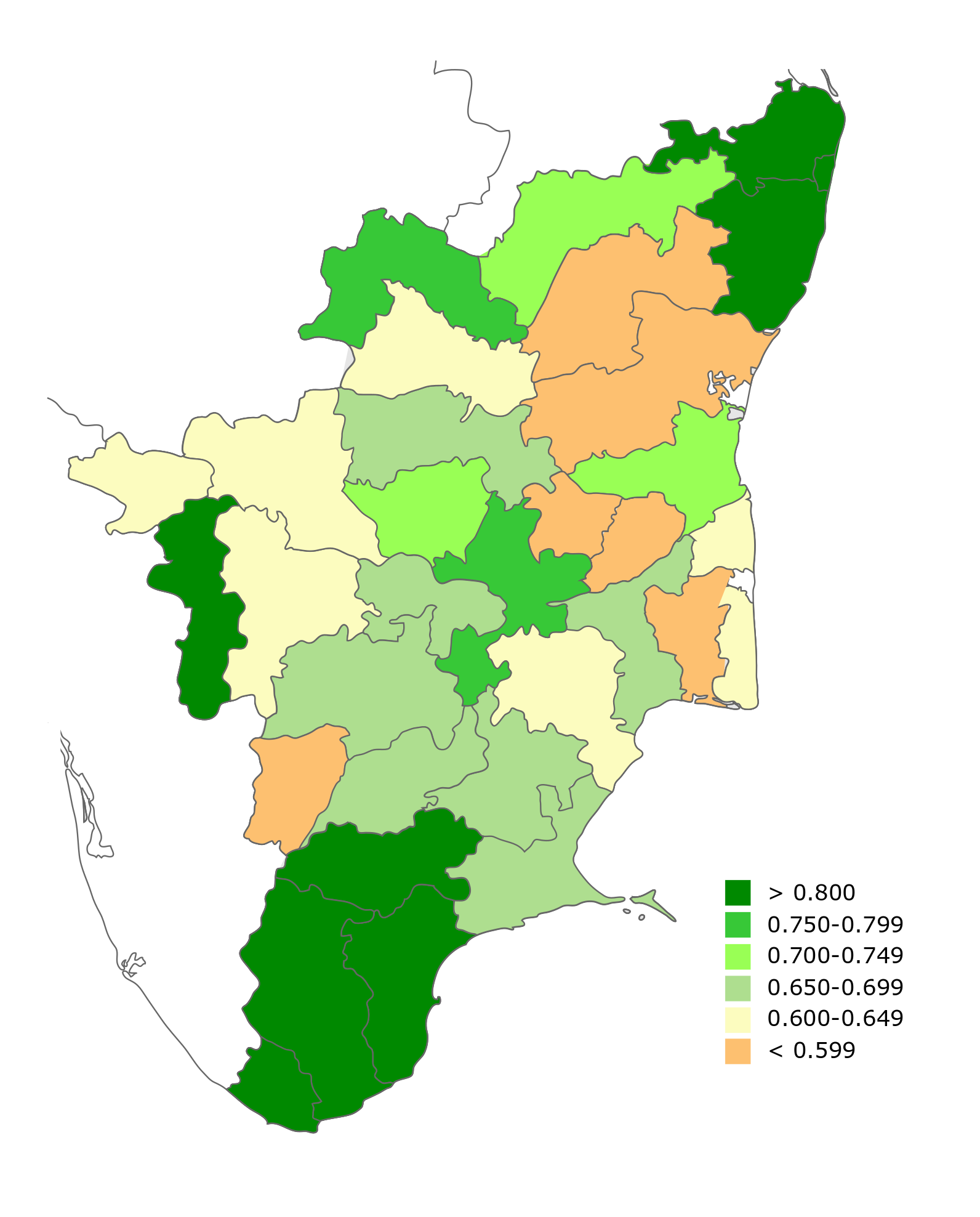
Map of the Tamil Nadu districts by HDI in 2017

The average Human Development Index (HDI) for the state of Tamil Nadu in 1996 calculated by the government's State Planning Commission was 0.636. By 2001, the average HDI for the state calculated by the State Planning Commission had risen to 0.657. The 2017 Human development Index was calculated by the state planning commission by the methodology of United Nations Development Programme (UNDP) was 0.708. While comparing with the 2003 data, the latest report has also shown that the two sets of reports are not strictly comparable. Besides, some districts in Tamil Nadu had seen separation in the last fourteen years.

While the Human development index in the report of 2003 had placed Chennai, Kanchipuram, Kanyakumari, Thoothukudi and Coimbatore as the districts in the top five positions, the latest report of 2017 shows that Kanyakumari has taken the first position. Virudhunagar district has the second place now, succeeded by Thoothokudi and Chennai went to the fourth place, followed by Kanchipuram.

Human Development Index is a composite index that takes into consideration:

1. Life expectancy
2. Education
3. Per capita income.

== HDI from 1995–2017 ==
Human Development Index of Indian states since 1995 by the State Planning Commission of Tamil Nadu (1995-2017):

No	District	HDI 1995	HDI 2001	HDI 2007	HDI 2011	HDI 2017 (UNDP Method)
1	Ariyalur					0.282
2	Chennai	0.752	0.757	0.842	0.859	0.847
3	Coimbatore	0.663	0.699	0.775	0.807	0.844
4	Cuddalore	0.59	0.644	0.709	0.745	0.719
5	Dharmapuri	0.576	0.584	0.656	0.706	0.644
6	Dindigul	0.599	0.641	0.705	0.735	0.691
7	Erode	0.644	0.658	0.721	0.755	0.616
8	Kanchipuram	0.685	0.712	0.778	0.809	0.845
9	Kanyakumari	0.679	0.711	0.763	0.812	0.944
10	Karur	0.628	0.647	0.737	0.785	0.668
11	Krishnagiri			0.665	0.742	0.788
12	Madurai	0.633	0.661	0.759	0.777	0.689
13	Nagapattinam	0.618	0.654	0.738	0.777	0.601
14	Namakkal	0.611	0.636	0.715	0.764	0.738
15	Nilgiris	0.667	0.685	0.745	0.767	0.624
16	Perambalur	0.592	0.596	0.697	0.703	0.447
17	Pudukottai	0.612	0.618	0.705	0.738	0.631
18	Ramanathapuram	0.622	0.629	0.703	0.737	0.653
19	Salem	0.622	0.626	0.717	0.762	0.669
20	Sivaganga	0.608	0.64	0.701	0.733	0.671
21	Thanjavur	0.586	0.63	0.714	0.754	0.655
22	Theni	0.618	0.628	0.726	0.726	0.539
23	Thiruvallur	0.654	0.654	0.767	0.801	0.801
24	Thiruvarur	0.598	0.637	0.719	0.743	0.568
25	Thoothukudi		0.703	0.791	0.802	0.852
26	Tirunelveli	0.652	0.658	0.74	0.77	0.802
27	Tiruppur					0.627
28	Tiruvannamalai	0.586	0.612	0.678	0.721	0.596
29	Trichy	0.638		0.732	0.784	0.774
30	Vellore	0.635	0.658	0.71	0.75	0.742
31	Villupuram		0.587	0.667	0.71	0.561
32	Virudhunagar	0.639	0.651	0.737	0.773	0.855
	Tamil Nadu	0.636	0.657	0.736	0.768	0.708

== Trend analysis ==
Compared with the previous Tamil Nadu's Human Development Reports by the state planning commission and the latest district-level government statistical report, Tamil Nadu has significantly improved its HDI in all of its administrative subdivisions.

The decline of the poverty rate has been very significant for Tamil Nadu, that it takes much of the pain to the political criticism against the Dravidian parties about corruption in the administration. The substantial reduction in urban and rural poverty at a huge level since the economic improvements of the 1990s, shows that poverty reduction and social well-being programmes have brought in rising incomes for the poor.

Kanyakumari is the district with the highest Human Development Index in the report of 2017. Kanyakumari also has the highest literacy rate in the state. Ariyalur has the lowest HDI in the 2017 report. Thoothukudi, with high life expectancy and high literacy rate, is in the top five districts. Ariyalur and Perambalur, due to its Per capita income being so low, came in the bottom five. Coimbatore, in spite of its high degree of industrialisation and Per capita income, does not rank in the top five districts with high Human Development Index in the report of 2017.

The previous report of 2003 showed that Chennai, Kanchipuram, Kanyakumari, Thoothukudi and Coimbatore were the top five districts. Though the two sets of reports are not strictly comparable given the separation of some districts between the two time points, some relative observations are made. According to the latest report, Kanyakumari has reached the top position, while Coimbatore does not even figure in the top five. The new entrant in the top five district category is Virudhunagar in the latest Human development report. Virudhunagar's rise to the top has been primarily due to its relatively higher per capita income which in turn can be connected to the spread of small scale industries, and a vibrant agricultural marketing economy. The five districts in the bottom of the previous report are Perambalur, Villupuram, Dharmapuri, Tiruvannamalai and Pudukottai. Many of these districts have been separated, but Perambalur and Villupuram continue to be at the bottom. Theni has newly entered into the bottom five.
