= Ashok Sekhar Ganguly =

Indian executive

Dr Ashok Sekhar Ganguly CBE

Member of Parliament, Rajya Sabha
- In office 18 November 2009 – 17 November 2015
- Preceded by: Chandan Mitra, BJP
- Constituency: Nominated

Personal details
- Born: 28 July 1935 (age 91) Patna
- Spouse: Shrimati Rooma Ganguly
- Education: Mumbai University; University of Illinois Urbana-Champaign

Ashok Shekar Ganguly CBE (born July 28, 1935) is an Indian industry expert and former chairman of Hindustan Lever, was a nominated member of the Rajya Sabha. His term ended on 17 November 2015.

== Early life and education ==
He was born on 28 July 1935 in Patna to Sekhar Nath and Binapani Ganguly. He was educated at the Master Tutorial High School, Mumbai, and obtained his B.Sc. degree from the Jaihind College, Mumbai. He completed his M.S. in 1959 and Ph.D. in 1961 from the University of Illinois Department of Food Science and Human Nutrition, College of Agriculture, Consumer and Environmental Sciences.

== Career ==
Much of Ganguly's working life has been with Unilever, where he spent over 35 years. He was the Chairman of Hindustan Lever from 1980 to 1990 and a member of the Unilever Board from 1990 to 1997. Ganguly has held board level positions with various other multinationals, including Hindustan Lever, ICI India, British Airways, Wipro, Tata AIG Life Insurance, Hemogenomics, and Firstsource Solutions. He was a member of the board of British Airways from 1996 to 2005.

== Public Service ==
Ganguly has been on various advisory boards to governments across the world

- Member, Science Advisory Council to the Prime Minister of India (1985–1989)
- Member, UK Advisory Board of Research Councils (1991–1994).
- Director on the central board of the Reserve Bank of India (2000–2009)
- Member, Prime Minister of India's Council on Trade and Industry
- Member, Investment commission of India
- Member, India-USA CEO Council
- Member, National Knowledge Commission, India

== Honours and awards ==
- Padma Vibhushan, 2009
- CBE, 2006
- Padma Bhushan, 1987
- Made Hon Professor by the Chinese Academy of Science, Shanghai (1996)
- Selected as ‘Outstanding Alumnus’ by University of Illinois in 1997
- Recipient of the International Alumni Award, University of Illinois, 2003
- Elected Fellow of the Royal Society of Chemistry, 1991
- Honorary Fellowship of Jawaharlal Nehru Centre for Advanced Scientific Research, Bangalore, 1995
