= Pappankurichi =

Pappakurichi
- Neighborhood of Tiruchirappalli
- Location in Tamil Nadu, India
- Coordinates: 10°48′42″N 78°44′41″E
- Country: India
- State: Tamil Nadu
- District: Tiruchirappalli

Population (2001)
  - Total: 20,439

Languages
  - Official: Tamil
- Time zone: UTC+5:30 (IST)

Pappakurichi is a neighbourhood of the city of Tiruchirappalli in Tamil Nadu, India. It was merged with the Tiruchirappalli Corporation in 2011.

== Demographics ==
As of 2001 India census, Pappakurichi had a population of 20,439. Males constitute 50% of the population and females 50%. Pappakurichi has an average literacy rate of 78%, higher than the national average of 59.5%: male literacy is 82%, and female literacy is 73%. In Pappakurichi, 10% of the population is under 6 years of age.
