= Krishnasamudram =

- Census town
- Location in Tamil Nadu, India
- Coordinates: 10°47′33″N 78°48′42″E
- Country: India
- State: Tamil Nadu
- District: Tiruchirappalli

Population (2001)
  - Total: 9,254

Languages
  - Official: Tamil
- Time zone: UTC+5:30 (IST)

Krishnasamudram is a census town in Tiruchirappalli district in the Indian state of Tamil Nadu.

== Demographics ==
As of 2001 India census, Krishnasamudram had a population of 9254. Males constitute 51% of the population and females 49%. Krishnasamudram has an average literacy rate of 84%, higher than the national average of 59.5%: male literacy is 87%, and female literacy is 80%. In Krishnasamudram, 8% of the population is under 6 years of age.
