= Manachanallur taluk =

Coordinates: 10°54′28″N 78°42′08″E

Manachanallur taluk is a taluk of Tiruchirapalli district of the Indian state of Tamil Nadu. The headquarters of the taluk is the town of Manachanallur.

== Demographics ==
According to the 2011 census, the taluk of Manachanallur had a population of 192,818 with 96,142 males and 96,676 females. There were 1006 women for every 1000 men. The taluk had a literacy rate of 74.64. Child population in the age group below 6 was 9,284 Males and 8,930 Females.

Its area istaluk is 36383.85 hectares and its villages are Perakambi, Seedevimangalam (North), Seedevimangalam (South), Shanamangalam, azhaiyur, Edumalai, Omandhur, Sirugudi, Valaiyur, Palaiyur, Thiruppattur, Siruganur, Konalai, Avaravelli, Thiruvallarai, Ayyampalayam, Ayikudi, Irungalur, Kallakkudi, S. Kannanoor (West), S. Kannanoor East), Samayapuram, Kalpalayam, Siruppathur, Thathamangalam, 94 Kariyamanickam, Rajampalayam, Poonampalayam, Theerampalayam, Thiruppangali (North), Thiruppangali (South), Solanganallur, Kariyamanickam (West), Kariyamanickam (East), Kariyamanickam (East), Killiyanallur (North), Killiyanallur (South), Killiyanallur, Melpathu, Thiruvasi, Kovathakudi, Alagiyamanavalam, Vengangudi, Koothur, Madavarperumalkovil, Pichandarkovil.
