= Azalapur =

Azalapur Ajlapur, Azlapur
- Village
- Location within Karnataka Location within India
- Coordinates: 16°35′22″N 077°25′25″E
- Country: India
- State: Karnataka
- District: Yadgir district
- Taluka: Gurumitkal

Government
  - Type: Panchayati raj (India)
  - Body: Gram panchayat

Area
  - Total: 16.8541 km^{2} (6.5074 sq mi)

Population (2011)
  - Total: 2,254
  - Density: 133.7/km^{2} (346.4/sq mi)

Languages
  - Official: Kannada
- Time zone: UTC+5:30 (IST)
- PIN: 585315
- ISO 3166 code: IN-KA
- Vehicle registration: KA
- Website: karnataka.gov.in

Azalapur is a panchayat village in the southern Indian state of Karnataka. Administratively, Azalapur is under Gurumitkal Taluka of Yadgir District.

== Geography ==
The village is 3.5km by road northwest of the village of Ujjelli in Telangana, and 20km by road east of the town of Saidapur in Yadgir Taluka. The nearest railhead is in Yadgir. Two lakes are located there.

== Government ==
Azalapur is administered by an elected sarpanch.

== Demographics ==
According to the 2011 census, Azalapur had a population of 2,254, of whom 1,098 were male and 1,156 female.

== Education ==
Azalapur has a government higher primary school that teaches in Kannada and Urdu, and two government high schools that offer instruction in Kannada. It has three anganwadi.

== Medical facilities ==
Azalapur has a government primary health centre.

== Scenic places ==
The Old Hanuman temple is located nearby.

== Festivals ==
Festivals include Dussehra.
