= Thottiyam =

- Town / Taluk
- Location in Tamil Nadu, India
- Coordinates: 10.9833°N 78.3333°E
- Country: India
- State: Tamil Nadu
- District: Tiruchirappalli
- Region: Central Tamil Nadu
- Taluk: Thottiyam

Population (2001)
  - Total: 13,757

Languages
  - Official: Tamil
- Time zone: UTC+5:30 (IST)
- Vehicle registration: TN-48

Thottiyam is a Selection Grade Nagar Panchayat and Taluk in Tiruchirappalli district in the Indian state of Tamil Nadu. It is situated 60 km north-west of Tiruchirapalli on Tiruchy-Namakkal State Highway (SH-25) and further it connects Namakkal-Salem-Bangalore National Highway (NH 7). It is located near the Kaveri River, about 12 km north-west of Musiri. Koranganatha Temple located in the outskirts of the town is a historic temple built during the Chola period in the 10th century. There is a village near by this town called Thirunarayana puram which has the famous Vedanarayana perumal temple, Thirunarayanapuram.

== Demographics ==
As of 2001 India census, Thottiyam had a population of 23,357. Males constitute 50% of the population and females 50%. Thottiyam has an average literacy rate of 73%, higher than the national average of 59.5%; male literacy is 81%, and female literacy is 66%. In Thottiyam, 10% of the population is under 6 years of age.

== Politics ==
Thottiyam current town panchayat president is Thamilselvi Thirugnanam. Thottiyam assembly constituency was a part of Karur (Lok Sabha constituency) and recently merged with the Perambalur (Lok Sabha constituency). The election commission has decided to merge the state assembly constituency of Thottiam with the Musiri constituency; political observers fear that it may affect the identity of this constituency.
