= Investment Commission =

Investment Commission of India

The Investment Commission of India (ICI) was a three-member investment commission, set up in the Ministry of Finance in December 2004 by the Government of India. Ratan Tata was the Chairman and Deepak Parekh and Dr. Ashok Sekhar Ganguly, former Hindustan Lever chairman, were members.

== History ==
The Investment Commission had been set up to enhance and facilitate investment in India. The Commission made recommendations to the Government of India on policies and procedures to facilitate investment, recommends projects and investment proposals that should be fast-tracked/mentored, and promotes India as an investment destination.

ICI is now abolished.

== See also ==
- Planning commission of India
