= T. Indragandhi =

Indian politician

T. Indragandhi (born 23 January 1968) is an Indian politician and was a member of the 14th Tamil Nadu Legislative Assembly from the Thuraiyur constituency, which is reserved for candidates from the Scheduled Castes. She represents the All India Anna Dravida Munnetra Kazhagam party and has been active in politics for the last 20 years.

Indragandhi was born in Analai on 23 January 1968. She has an MA degree and is married with three children. She was a member of Tiruchirappalli Corporation between 2001 and 2006. Hailing from a well educated family, she successfully contested in 2011 assembly elections and was the first MLA for the constituency and won by a good margin.
