= Maganoor mandal =

Maganoor
- village
- Country: India
- State: Telangana
- District: Narayanpet

Languages
  - Official: Telugu
- Time zone: UTC+5:30 (IST)
- Vehicle registration: TG 38
- Climate: hot (Köppen)

Maganoor is a Mandal in Narayanpet district, Telangana.

== Villages ==
The villages in Maganoor mandal include:

- Adivisatyar
- Ainapur
- Alampalle
- Chegunta
- Gudeballur
- Hindupur
- Kolpur
- Kothapalle
- Krishna
- Kunsi
- Maganoor
- Mandipalli
- Mudmal
- Neradgum
- Thangadigi
- Ujjelli
- Wadwat
- Warkoor
