= Sirugamani =

- Panchayat town
- Location in Tamil Nadu, India Sirugamani (India)
- Coordinates: 10°53′51″N 78°30′51″E
- Country: India
- State: Tamil Nadu
- District: Tiruchirappalli

Population (2001)
  - Total: 10,031

Languages
  - Official: Tamil
- Time zone: UTC+5:30 (IST)

Sirugamani is a panchayat town in Srirangam taluk Tiruchirappalli district in the Indian state of Tamil Nadu. It is on the bank of river Kaveri, a few miles away from Trichy. It is between Perugamani and Kaavalkara Palayam near Pettavaaithalai.

== Demographics ==
As of 2001 India census, Sirugamani had a population of 10,031. Males constitute 50% of the population and females 50%. Sirugamani has an average literacy rate of 72%, higher than the national average of 59.5%: male literacy is 80%, and female literacy is 64%. In Sirugamani, 11% of the population is under 6 years of age. Mr KRR Rajalingam was the only person to become chairman of Sirugamani town panchayat for two times (1996–2001) and (2006–2011). His father Mr R. Rathinagiri was the former chairman of Sirugamani town Panchayat.
