= Saidapur, Yadgir =

Saidapur
- Location within Karnataka Location within India
- Coordinates: 16°33′49″N 077°15′58″E
- Country: India
- State: Karnataka
- District: Yadgir district
- Taluka: Yadgir

Population (2011)
  - Total: 5,432

Languages
  - Official: Kannada
- Time zone: UTC+5:30 (IST)
- PIN: 585221
- Telephone code: 08473
- ISO 3166 code: IN-KA
- Vehicle registration: KA-33
- Website: karnataka.gov.in

Saidapur is a census town and panchayat village in the southern state of Karnataka, India. Administratively, Saidapur is under Yadgir Taluka of Yadgir District in Karnataka. The village of Saidapur is 14 km by road west of the village of Badepalli, and 33 km by road south of the town of Yadgir. Saidapur has its own railway station which comes on Bangalore-Mumbai and Mumbai-Chennai main corridor.

There are five villages in the gram panchayat: Saidapur, Balched, Kyathanhalli, Rachanhalli, and Rampur.

== Demographics ==
As of 2011 census, the village of Saidapur had 5,432 inhabitants, with 2,726 males and 2,706 females.
