= Koothappar =

Koothaippar koothappar
- Neighborhood
- Location in Tamil Nadu, India
- Coordinates: 10°47′45″N 78°47′50″E
- Country: India
- State: Tamil Nadu
- District: Tiruchirappalli

Population (2001)
  - Total: 17,061

Languages
  - Official: Tamil
- Time zone: UTC+5:30 (IST)
- Pincode: 620013

.

== Geography ==
Koothappar is located at 10.795833°N 78.797222°E. It lies close to Kaveri River and the famous Kallanai Dam (also known as the Grand Anicut) is just 5 km from here.

== Demographics ==
As of 2001 India census, Koothappar had a population of 17,061. Males constitute 50% of the population and females 50%. Koothappar has an average literacy rate of 87%, higher than the national average of 59.5%. Male literacy is 91%, and female literacy is 84%. In Koothappar, 7% of the population is under 6 years of age.

== Transportation ==
Regular bus service connects the town with the intra-city terminal Chathiram Bus Station, Tiruchirappalli (also called as Main Guard Gate). The nearest railway station is Thiruverumbur and the nearby airport is Tiruchirapalli International Airport.
