= Sirugudi =

- village
- Location in Tamil Nadu, India Sirugudi (India)
- Coordinates: 10.262723°N 78.308804°E
- Country: India
- State: Tamil Nadu
- District: Dindigul district

Languages
  - Official: Tamil
- Time zone: UTC+5:30 (IST)
- PIN: 624 402
- Lok Sabha constituency: Dindigul
- Avg. summer temperature: 35 °C (95 °F)
- Avg. winter temperature: 18 °C (64 °F)

Sirugudi is a village located in Natham Taluk in dindigul District, Tamil Nadu State, India. Sirugudi is located 12.6 km distance from its Taluk Main Town Natham.

It is 48 km far from its District Main City Dindigul. It is 413 km far from its State Capital City Chennai.

According to Census 2011 information the location code or village code of Sirugudi village is 635305. Sirugudi village is located in Natham Tehsil of Dindigul district in Tamil Nadu, India. It is situated 13 km away from sub-district headquarter Natham and 48 km away from district headquarter Dindigul. As per 2009 stats, Sirugudi village is itself a gram panchayat.

The total geographical area of village is 1846.67 hectares. Sirugudi has a total population of 9,524 people. There are about 2,315 houses in Sirugudi village. Natham is nearest town to Sirugudi.

Sirugudi has total 2315 families. The Sirugudi village has population of 9524 of which 4770 are males while 4754 are females as per Population Census 2011. In Sirugudi village population of children with age 0-6 is 928.

Pin Code of Sirugudi is 624 402
