= Thuraiyur =

Thuraiyur Theerthapuri
- Municipality
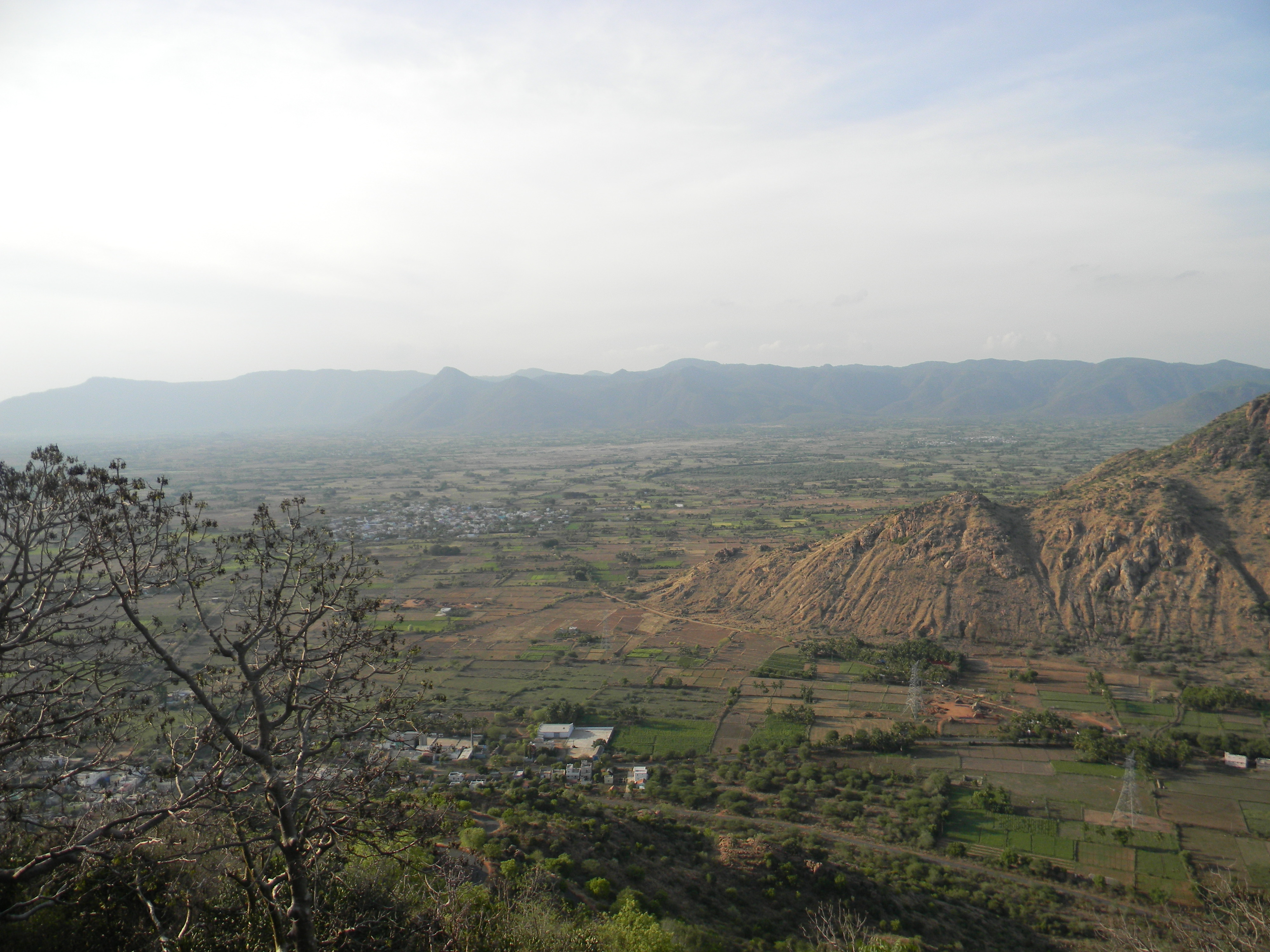
- A view from Thuraiyur Perumal malai (hill)

- Location in Tamil Nadu, India
- Coordinates: 11°10′7″N 78°37′16″E
- Country: India
- State: Tamil Nadu
- Region: Kongu Nadu
- District: Tiruchirappalli
- Taluk: Thuraiyur

Government
  - Type: Urban
  - Body: Selected Grade Municipality

Area
  - Total: 15 km^{2} (5.8 sq mi)
  - Rank: A grade

Population (2011)
  - Total: 32,439
  - Density: 2,200/km^{2} (5,600/sq mi)

Languages
  - Official: Tamil
- Time zone: UTC+5:30 (IST)
- PIN: 621010
- Telephone code: 04327(XXXXXX)
- Vehicle registration: TN-48
- Website: Thuraiyur Municipality

Thuraiyur is a Municipality in the Tiruchirappalli district in the Indian state of Tamil Nadu. It was upgraded to a III Grade Municipality from Town Panchayat on 17 January 1970, and to a II Grade Municipality in May 1998. It was upgraded to Selection Grade Municipality in the year 2008. It is also a taluka (administrative centre). It is located 310 km away from Chennai.

== Demographics ==
Religious census
Religion	Percent(%)
Hindu	95.36%
Muslim	3.27%
Christian	1.3%
Other	0.05%
No religion	0.01%

According to the 2011 census, Thuraiyur had a population of 32,439 with a sex-ratio of 1,032 females for every 1,000 males which is far above the national average of 929. A total of 2,936 individuals were under the age of six, consisting of 1,493 males and 1,443 females. Scheduled Castes and Scheduled Tribes accounted for 18.18% and .59% of the population respectively. The average literacy of the town was 78.96%, compared to the national average of 72.99%. The town had a total of 8,674 households. There was a total of 11,935 workers, comprising 230 cultivators, 1,188 agricultural labourers, 303 in household industries, 9,880 other workers, 334 marginal workers, 9 marginal cultivators, 80 marginal agricultural labourers, 18 marginal workers in household industries and 227 other marginal workers. As per the religious census of 2011, Thuraiyur (M) had 95.36% Hindus, 3.27% Muslims, 1.3% Christians, 0.05% following other religions and 0.01% following no religion or did not indicate any religious preference.

== Economy ==
Most people in Thuraiyur are employed in the agriculture sector. Paddy and corn are the predominant crops grown in the area. Currently, the economy of this town is based on agricultural products and jewelry. Thuraiyur's economy has witnessed a significant change brought about by handloom manufacturers. With the advancement of powerlooms, traditional handlooms have begun to lose their significance. However, handloom is one of the main occupations among the people of Thuraiyur.

Thuraiyur is one of the very few towns in Tamil Nadu to have a high grade water management system. During the Monsoon, rain water from the nearby hills fill the lakes used to irrigate the surrounding agricultural lands. When the lake reaches its maximum level, safety valves are opened to drain the excess water into the neighbouring temple tank through an underground canal. Another underground canal also runs through the heart of town from Periya Eri to Chinna Eri, to irrigate the fields located south of Thuraiyur.

== Transport ==
Thuraiyur is well connected by road to cities like: Trichy, Namakkal, Musiri, Perambalur, Ariyalur, Jayankondam, Coimbatore, Ooty, Chennai, Karur, Attur, Thammampatti and Salem and& Madurai. In addition to the main bus routes, mini buses play an important role in connecting villages within the hinterland. The nearest railway station is located in Trichy and Ariyalur. The nearest airport is Tiruchirappalli International Airport which offers international and domestic flights, and Madurai International Airport. It has a separate Regional Transport Unit Office Numbered as TN-48-Z-****. It has a Tamil Nadu State Transport Corporation (TNSTC) depot under the Thiruchirappali Division.

== Nearby places ==
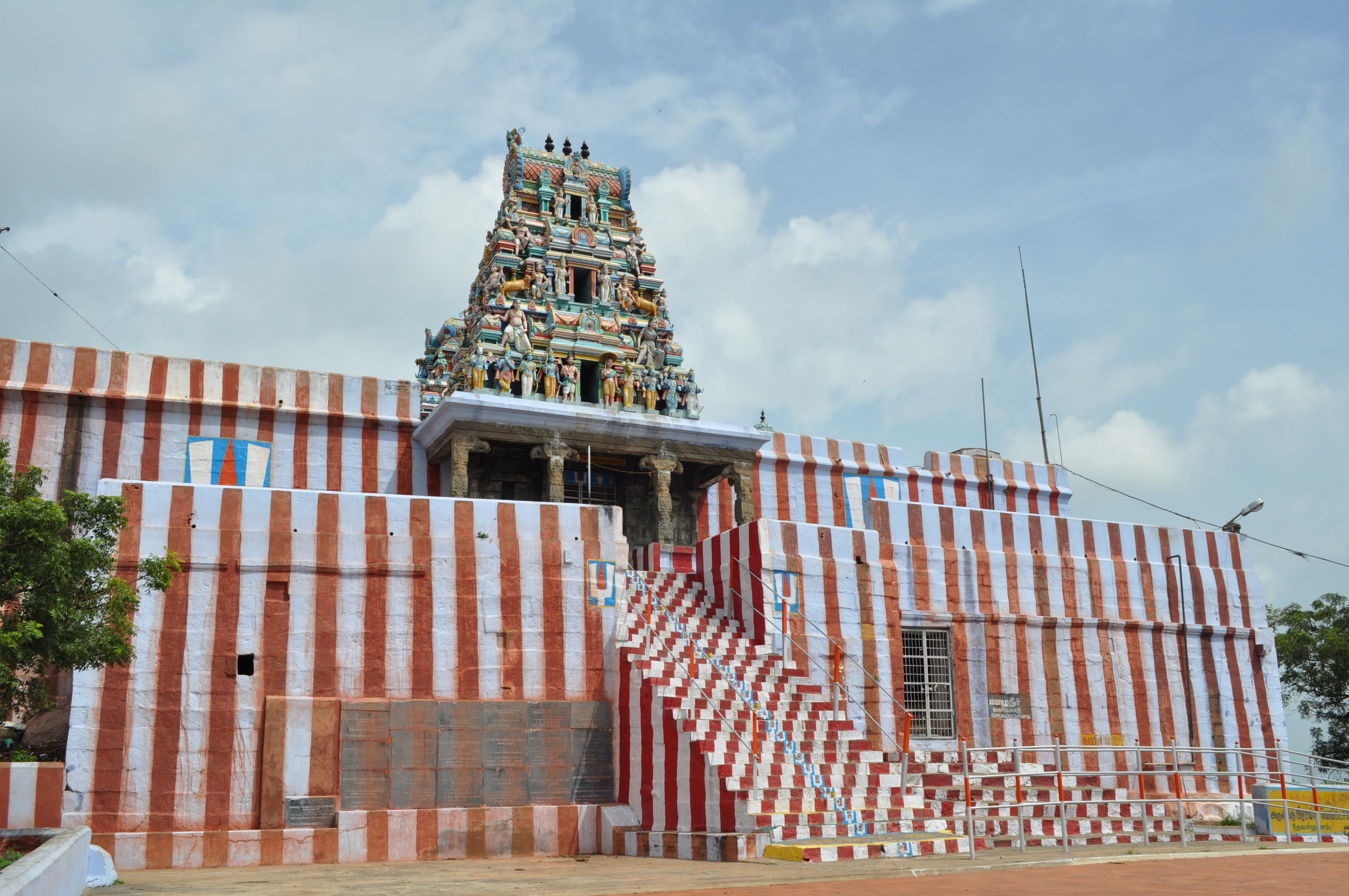
Perumal Malai Temple

=== Prasanna Venkatachalapathi Temple ===
Prasanna Venkatachalapathi Temple, situated on the Thuraiyur-Perambalur road, is the most prominent temple in the town. It temple is located at the top of Perumalmalai, which lies 960 ft (290 m) above ground level in the Pachamalai hills, 3 km (1.9 mi) from Thuraiyur in Tiruchirappalli district. The site is accessible via a mountain road. The temple is believed to have been constructed by the grandson of Karikala Chozhan. The kings were later named Karuppannar and Veeraswamy and they are worshiped at the temple. Thousands of devotees take part in the Girivalam (circumambulation around a mountain or hill) procession around the Perumalmalai hillock on all full-moon days. In the Tamil month of Puratassi, Saturday is very popular. Many devotees from different places come to worship. The buildings are up to 1800 years old and include one of the remaining examples of Chola temple construction. The temple contains the "Sabthasvara thoongal", the seven musical pillars that produce musical sounds when banged. It is also called South Tripathi because where this temple is located on mountain also contains seven hills like Thirumazha Tripathy.
