= Thottiyam taluk =

Coordinates: 10.995646°N 78.324636°E

Thottiyam taluk is a taluk of Tiruchirapalli district of the Indian state of Tamil Nadu. The headquarters of the taluk is in the town of Thottiyam.

== Demographics ==
According to the 2011 census, Thottiyam Taluk had an estimated population of 135,118 people with 67,258 males and 67,860 females. Approximately 1009 women live there for every 1000 men. Thottiyam Taluk has a literacy rate of 67.87%. Childhood (age 0–6 years) literacy in 2011 was estimated to be about 12,873, with around 6,695 males and 6,178 females. The village of Manamedu Trichy is located within Thottiyam taluk. There is a Facebook page for the taluk.
