= Tiruchirappalli East taluk =

In Tiruchirapalli district, Tamil Nadu, India

Tiruchirappalli East Taluk is a taluk in the Tiruchirapalli district in the Indian state of Tamil Nadu. It was formed in 2013 when the Tiruchirappalli taluk was bifurcated into Tiruchirappalli East and Tiruchirappalli West. Wards 7 to 38 and 43 of the Tiruchirappalli Municipal Corporation come under the East Taluk. This taluk covers most parts of Tiruchirappalli East constituency and has a separate regional transport office at Sanjeevi Nagar at Devadhanam.

== Demographics ==
According to the 2001 census, Tiruchirappalli East covered an area of 67.27 square kilometres (25.97 sq mi) and had a population of 314,493. The taluk had a literacy rate of 82.25%.
