= Thiruverumbur taluk =

Coordinates: 10°47′15″N 78°46′35″E

Thiruverumbur taluk is a taluk of Tiruchirappalli district of the Indian state of Tamil Nadu. The headquarters is the town of Thiruverumbur.Corporation wards 61 to 65 are located here. This taluk consists of 30 revenue villages.

== Demographics ==
According to the 2011 census, the taluk of Thiruverumbur had a population of 225,338 with 114,623 males and 110,715 females. There were 966 women for every 1,000 men. The taluk had a literacy rate of 81.74%. Child population in the age group below 6 years were 9,902 Males and 9,580 Females.
