= Planning Commission (India) =

Indian economic commission and advisory agency

- Planning commission of India

Agency overview
- Formed: 15 March 1950; 76 years ago
- Dissolved: 17 August 2014; 11 years ago
- Superseding agency: NITI Aayog
- Headquarters: Yojana Bhavan, New Delhi
- Agency executive: Prime Minister of India
- Parent agency: Government of India
- Website: planningcommission.gov.in

The Planning Commission was an institution in the Government of India which formulated India's Five-Year Plans, among other functions.

In his first Independence Day speech in 2014, Prime Minister Narendra Modi announced his intention to dissolve the Planning Commission. It has since been replaced by a new institution named NITI Aayog.

== History ==
Rudimentary economic planning, deriving from the sovereign authority of the state, was first initiated in India in 1938 by Congress President Netaji Subhash Chandra Bose, Atul Tiwari, Pandit Jawaharlal Nehru who had been persuaded by Meghnad Saha to set up a National Planning Committee. M. Visvesvaraya had been elected head of the Planning Committee. Meghnad Saha approached him and requested him to step down, putting forward the argument that planning needed a reciprocity between science and politics. M. Visvesvaraya generously agreed and Jawaharlal Nehru was made head of the National Planning Committee. The British Raj also formally established the Advisory Planning Board under K. C. Neogy that functioned from 1944 to 1946.

Industrialists and economists independently formulated at least three development plans. Some scholars have argued that the introduction of planning as an instrument was intended to transcend the ideological divisions between Mahatma Gandhi and Nehru. Other scholars have argued that the Planning Commission, as a central agency in the context of plural democracy in India, needs to carry out more functions than rudimentary economic planning.

After India achieved independence, a formal model of planning was adopted, and accordingly the Planning Commission, reporting directly to the Prime Minister of India, was established on 15 March 1950, with Prime Minister Jawaharlal Nehru as the chairman. Authority for creation of the Planning Commission was not derived from the Constitution of India or statute; it is an arm of the Central Government of India.

The first Five-Year Plan was launched in 1951, focusing mainly on development of the agricultural sector. Two subsequent Five-Year Plans were formulated before 1965, when there was a break because of the Indo-Pakistan conflict. Two successive years of drought, devaluation of the currency, a general rise in prices and erosion of resources disrupted the planning process and after three Annual Plans between 1966 and 1969, the fourth Five-Year Plan was started in 1969.

The Eighth Plan could not take off in 1990 due to the fast changing political situation at the centre, and the years 1990–91 and 1991–92 were treated as Annual Plans. The Eighth Plan was finally launched in 1992 after the initiation of structural adjustment policies.

For the first eight Plans the emphasis was on a growing public sector with massive investments in basic and heavy industries, but since the launch of the Ninth Plan in 1997, the emphasis on the public sector has become less pronounced and the current thinking on planning in the country, in general, is that it should increasingly be of an indicative nature.

In 2014, the Narendra Modi government decided to wind down the Planning Commission. It was replaced by the newly formed NITI Aayog.

== Organisation ==
The composition of the Commission underwent considerable changes since its initiation. With the Prime Minister as the ex officio Chairperson, the committee had a nominated deputy chairperson, with the rank of a full Cabinet Minister. Cabinet Ministers with certain important portfolios acted as ex officio members of the commission, while the full-time members were experts in various fields like economics, industry, science and general administration.

Ex officio members of the Commission included the Finance Minister, Agriculture Minister, Home Minister, Health Minister, Chemicals and Fertilisers Minister, Information Technology Minister, Law Minister, Human Resource Development Minister and Minister of State for Planning.

The Commission worked through its various divisions, of which there were two kinds:

- General Planning Divisions
- Programme Administration Divisions

The majority of the experts in the commission were economists, making the commission the biggest employer of the Indian Economic Service.

== Functions ==
The Indian Planning Commission's functions as outlined by the Government's 1950 resolution are following:

1. To make an assessment in the material, capital and human resources of India, including technical personnel, and investigate the possibilities of augmenting those are related resources which are found to be deficient in relation to the nation's requirement.
2. To formulate a plan for the most effective and balanced utilisation of country's resources.
3. To define the stages, on the basis of priority, in which the plan should be carried out and propose the allocation of resources for the due completion of each stage.
4. To indicate the factors that tend to retard economic development.
5. To determine the conditions which need to be established for the successful execution of the plan within the incumbent socio-political situation of the country.
6. To determine the nature of the machinery required for securing the successful implementation of each stage of the plan in all its aspects.
7. To appraise from time to time the progress achieved in the execution of each stage of the plan and also recommend the adjustments of policy and measures which are deemed important vis-a-vis a successful implementation of the plan.
8. To make necessary recommendations from time to time regarding those things which are deemed necessary for facilitating the execution of these functions. Such recommendations can be related to the prevailing economic conditions, current policies, measures or development programmes. They can even be given out in response to some specific problems referred to the commission by the central or the state governments.

== Social media ==
In March 2013, Planning Commission launched a massive social media campaign for spreading Awareness about 12th Five Year Plan. It was followed by a series of Google+ Hangouts and a Plan Hackathon. By September 2013, it had made a considerable presence on social media with over a hundred thousand Twitter followers and a considerable size on Facebook, YouTube, SlideShare, and Instagram.

== See also ==
- Investment commission of India
- Five-Year Plans of India
- Ministry of Finance, Government of India
- Finance Commission of India
- NITI Aayog
