= Thuraiyur Assembly constituency =

One of the 234 State Legislative Assembly Constituencies in Tamil Nadu in India

Coordinates: 11.14°N 78.60°E

Thuraiyur
- Constituency No. 146 for the Tamil Nadu Legislative Assembly

Constituency details
- Country: India
- Region: South India
- State: Tamil Nadu
- District: Tiruchirappalli
- Lok Sabha constituency: Perambalur
- Established: 1957
- Total electors: 2,10,753
- Reservation: SC

Member of Legislative Assembly
- 17th Tamil Nadu Legislative Assembly
- Incumbent Ravisankar.M; Deputy Speaker of the Tamil Nadu Legislative Assembly
- Party: TVK
- Elected year: 2026

Thuraiyur is a state assembly constituency in Tiruchirappalli, Tamil Nadu, India newly formed after constituency delimitations in 1957. Its State Assembly Constituency number is 146. It is included in Tiruchirappalli Lok Sabha constituency. It is one of the 234 State Legislative Assembly Constituencies in Tamil Nadu in India.

== Members of the Legislative Assembly ==
Year	Name	Party
2011	T. Indragandhi	All India Anna Dravida Munnetra Kazhagam
2016	S. Stalinkumar	Dravida Munnetra Kazhagam
2021	S. Stalinkumar	Dravida Munnetra Kazhagam
2026	Ravisankar.M	Tamilaga Vettri Kazhagam

== Election results ==
Vote share of winning candidates
2026	35.93%
2021	50.37%
2016	48.10%
2011	50.67%
1952	42.17%

=== 2026 ===
2026 Tamil Nadu Legislative Assembly election: Thuraiyur
Party	Candidate	Votes	%	±%
TVK	Ravisankar.M	66,263	35.93	New
AIADMK	E. Saroja	56,649	30.72	▼6.99
INC	M. Lenin Prasath	49,222	26.69	New
NTK	S Kowsalya	8,436	4.57	▼2.98
NOTA	NOTA	697	0.38	▼0.53
BSP	P.Srinivasan	588	0.32	New
TVK	Gnanavettiyan Sivaperumal.K	513	0.28	New
Independent	M. Ravichandran	391	0.21	New
Independent	K.Selvam	356	0.19	New
Independent	G. Dhineshkumar	326	0.18	New
PT	T. Rajamanickam	236	0.13	New
Independent	N. Muthazhagu	213	0.12	New
Independent	Selvam.G	193	0.10	New
Independent	P.Saroja	141	0.08	New
Independent	K.Saroja	107	0.06	New
Independent	E.Saroja	95	0.05	New
Margin of victory		9,614	5.21	▼7.45
Turnout		1,84,426	87.51	▲10.45
Registered electors		2,10,753		▼15,399
TVK gain from DMK		Swing	▲35.93	

=== 2021 ===
2021 Tamil Nadu Legislative Assembly election: Thuraiyur
Party	Candidate	Votes	%	±%
DMK	S. Stalinkumar	87,786	50.37%	+2.27
AIADMK	T. Indragandhi	65,715	37.71%	−5.63
NTK	R. Tamilzhselvi	13,158	7.55%	+6.65
MNM	T. N. Yuvarajan	2,528	1.45%	New
AMMK	K. Subramanian	2,435	1.40%	New
NOTA	NOTA	1,594	0.91%	−0.53
Margin of victory		22,071	12.66%	7.90%
Turnout		174,282	77.06%	−3.39%
Rejected ballots		101	0.06%	
Registered electors		226,152		
DMK hold		Swing	2.27%	

=== 2016 ===
2016 Tamil Nadu Legislative Assembly election: Thuraiyur
Party	Candidate	Votes	%	±%
DMK	S. Stalinkumar	81,444	48.10%	+4.79
AIADMK	A. Maivizhi	73,376	43.33%	−7.34
VCK	L. R. Sujadevi	6,281	3.71%	New
NOTA	NOTA	2,441	1.44%	New
NTK	S. Sathya	1,532	0.90%	New
Margin of victory		8,068	4.76%	−2.60%
Turnout		169,329	80.46%	−1.57%
Registered electors		210,463		
DMK gain from AIADMK		Swing	-2.58%	

=== 2011 ===
2011 Tamil Nadu Legislative Assembly election: Thuraiyur
Party	Candidate	Votes	%	±%
AIADMK	T. Indragandhi	75,228	50.67%	New
DMK	S. Parimala Devi	64,293	43.31%	New
BJP	S. Rengaraji	1,828	1.23%	New
Independent	V. Ganesan	1,753	1.18%	New
Independent	A. Dharmalingam	1,295	0.87%	New
BSP	M. Arivalagan	1,289	0.87%	New
Independent	S. Sumathi	945	0.64%	New
Independent	J. K. Senthilkumar	811	0.55%	New
Margin of victory		10,935	7.37%	
Turnout		148,452	82.02%	
Registered electors		180,988		
AIADMK win (new seat)				

=== 1952 ===
1952 Madras Legislative Assembly election : Thuraiyur
Party	Candidate	Votes	%	±%
Independent	P. Rangaswami Reddiar	20,097	42.17%	New
INC	A. V. Rangaswami	19,804	41.56%	New
Independent	P. Ramanathan	4,104	8.61%	New
Socialist Party (India)	Annamalai	2,313	4.85%	New
Independent	Thiruloga Sitharama	1,336	2.80%	New
Margin of victory		293	0.61%	
Turnout		47,654	59.53%	
Registered electors		80,054		
Independent win (new seat)				
