= Manachanallur =

- Neighbourhood/Taluk
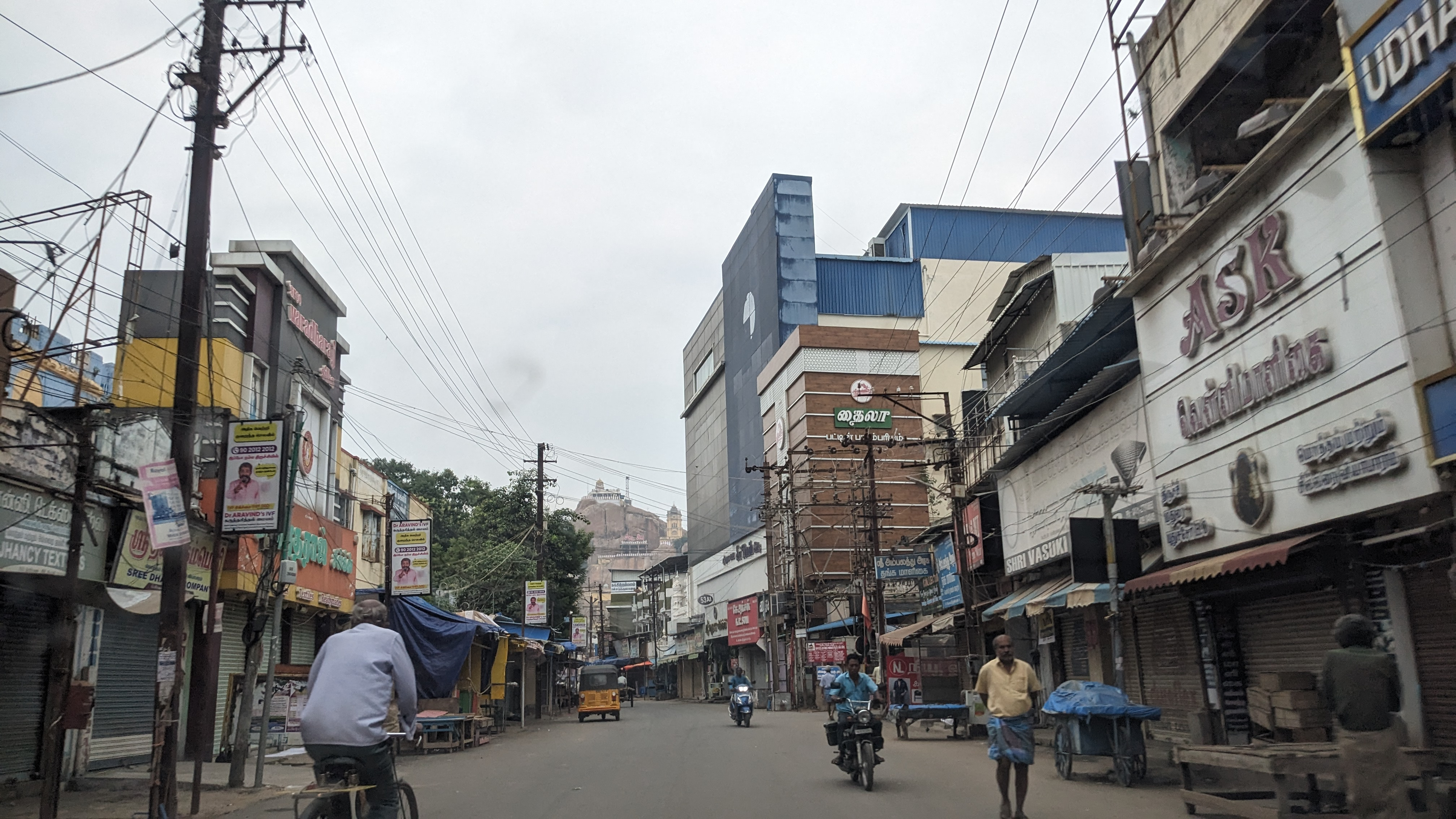
- Nickname: RiceFort/Mannai Maanagaram
- Location in Tamil Nadu, India
- Coordinates: 10°54′28″N 78°42′08″E
- Country: India
- State: Tamil Nadu
- District: Tiruchirappalli
- Division: Lalgudi
- Taluk: Manachanallur

Government
  - Type: City municipal Corporation
  - Body: Tiruchirappalli City Municipal Corporation

Population (2011)
  - Total: 25,931

Languages
  - Official: Tamil
- Time zone: UTC+5:30 (IST)
- PIN: 621005
- Vehicle registration: TN 48

Mannachanallur is a neighbourhood in the city of Tiruchirapalli (Trichy or Tiruchi) and Taluk in the Indian state of Tamil Nadu. It was merged with the Tiruchirappalli Corporation in 2023. Mannachanallur is famous for rice mills

== Demographics ==
As of 2011 India census, Mannachanallur had a population of 25,931. Males constitute 49% of the population and females 51%. Mannachanallur has an average literacy rate of 78%, higher than the national average of 59.5%: male literacy is 80%, and female literacy is 69%. In Mannachanallur, 11% of the population is under 6 years of age. There are 40 villages in this taluk.

== Transportation ==
Mannachanallur is well connected by road. The state highways SH62 pass through Mannachanallur. There are regular buses to Thuraiyur. Mannachanallur is also well connected to the neighbouring villages by mini buses. The nearest railway station and airport is located in Trichy, near connected Samayapuram by pass Chennai highway.

== Importance and news ==
Mannachanallur became a new assembly constituency of Tamil Nadu since the last elections. The constituency's Former MLA Mr.T.P.Poonachi Muthuraja had also become a minister for Khadi and Village Industries in the current Tamil Nadu cabinet. Current MLA of Mannachanallur - Mr.Mannachanallur S.Kathiravan Manachanallur Giridharan, a noted music director hails from this town.
