= Musiri taluk =

Coordinates: 10.93°N 78.45°E

Musiri
- taluk
- Interactive map of Musiri
- Country: India
- State: Tamil Nadu
- District: Tiruchirapalli district
- Taluk: Musiri

Population (2011)
  - Total: 226,372

Languages
  - Official: Tamil
- Time zone: UTC+5:30 (IST)
- PIN: 621211

Musiri taluk is a taluk of Tiruchirapalli district of the Indian state of Tamil Nadu. The headquarters of the taluk is the town of Musiri.

== Demographics ==
According to the 2011 census, the taluk of Musiri had a population of 226,372 (113,033 males and 113,339 females); there were 1,003 women for every 1,000 men. The taluk had a literacy rate of 69.68%. Child population in the age group below 6 was 11,336 males and 10,488 females. Among the total population, 157,739 people are literates.
