= Thuraiyur taluk =

Taluk in Tamil Nadu, India

Population
  - Total: 249,060

Thuraiyur taluk is a taluk of Tiruchirapalli district of the Indian state of Tamil Nadu. The headquarters of the taluk is the town of Thuraiyur.

== Demographics ==
According to the 2011 census, the taluk of Thuraiyur had a population of 249,060 with 123,062 males and 125,998 females. There were 1,024 women for every 1,000 men. The taluk had a literacy rate of 71.42%. Child population in the age group below 6 years were 11,705 males and 10,708 females.

== Climate ==
In spite of hills surrounding this region, this taluk is very hot. In the summer temperatures rises up to 43 °C. In the winter the temperature is mild and at night falls to 14 °C. It is foggy in December and January. During June and July wind speed is less in this region in comparison to other parts of Tamil Nadu.
