= Musiri =

- Town
- Location in Tamil Nadu, India
- Coordinates: 10.93°N 78.45°E
- Country: India
- State: Tamil Nadu
- Elevation: 82 m (269 ft)

Population (2011)
  - Total: 27,941

Languages
  - Official: Tamil
- Time zone: UTC+5:30 (IST)
- Postal code: 621211
- Area code: 04326
- Vehicle registration: TN-48 (formerly TN-47)

Musiri is a Municipality and major town in the Tiruchirappalli district .And fastest growing town in Tamil Nadu It has an average elevation of 155 metres (269 feet).

== Etymology ==
The original name for Musiri comes from the Tamil word Musiram

== History ==
Musiri, located in the Tiruchirappalli district of Tamil Nadu, India, holds a place of historical and cultural significance that spans back to prehistoric times. The region’s antiquity is evidenced by archaeological finds and epigraphical records, as well as its strategic location along the northern bank of the Cauvery River.

== Demographics ==
=== Population ===
As of 2011 India census, Musiri had a population of 27,941. Males constitute 50% of the population and females 50%. Musiri has an average literacy rate of 75%, male literacy is 80%, and female literacy is 69%. In Musiri, 11% of the population is under 6 years of age.

== Government and politics ==
Musiri (state assembly constituency) is a separate assembly constituency falling under Perambalur (Lok Sabha constituency). It is a Taluk and Revenue Division headquarters in Tiruchirappalli District of Tamil Nadu state in India.

== Economy ==
Agriculture is the main occupation in this town situated on the northern bank of Kaveri river having a broad width of more than 1km. The crops include paddy, sugar cane, banana and vegetables. Korai grass(Reed) mat/Chatai mat weaving is done here.

== Transport ==
Musiri Bus Stand

=== By Road ===
The town is connected to Kulithalai town by a 1.45-kilometre-long (0.90 mi) bridge across river Kaveri.
