= Tiruchirappalli district =

- District of Tamil Nadu
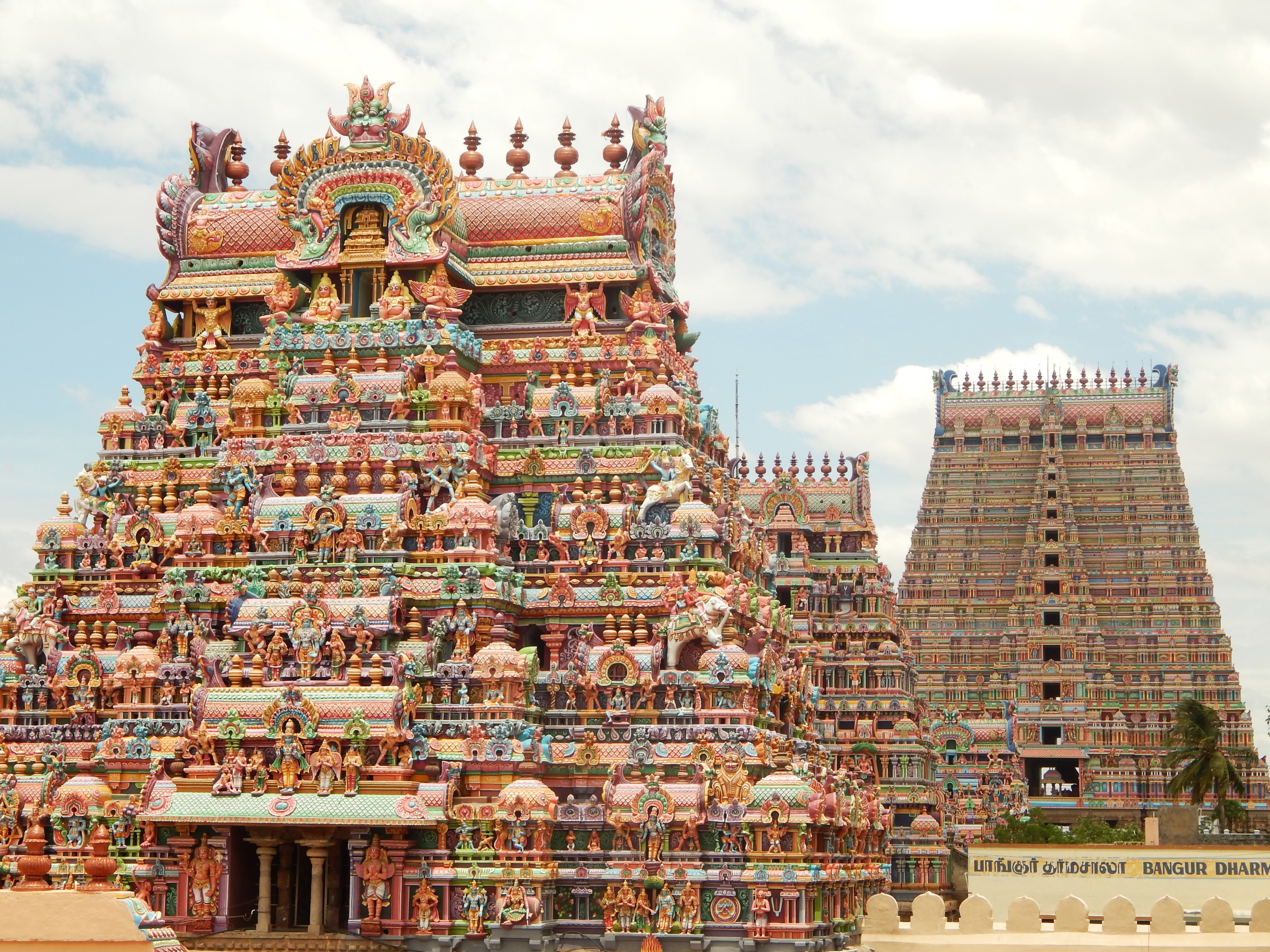
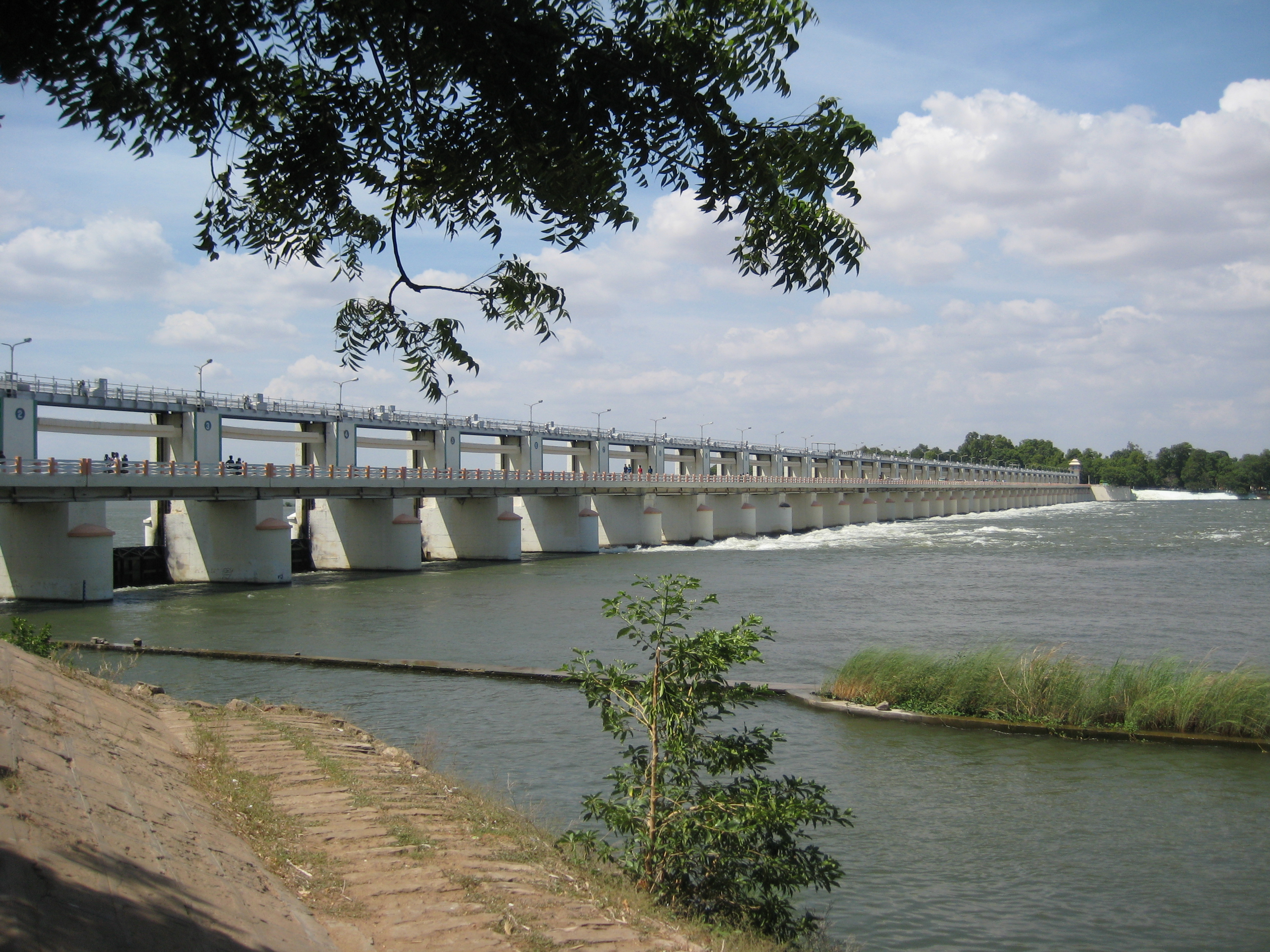
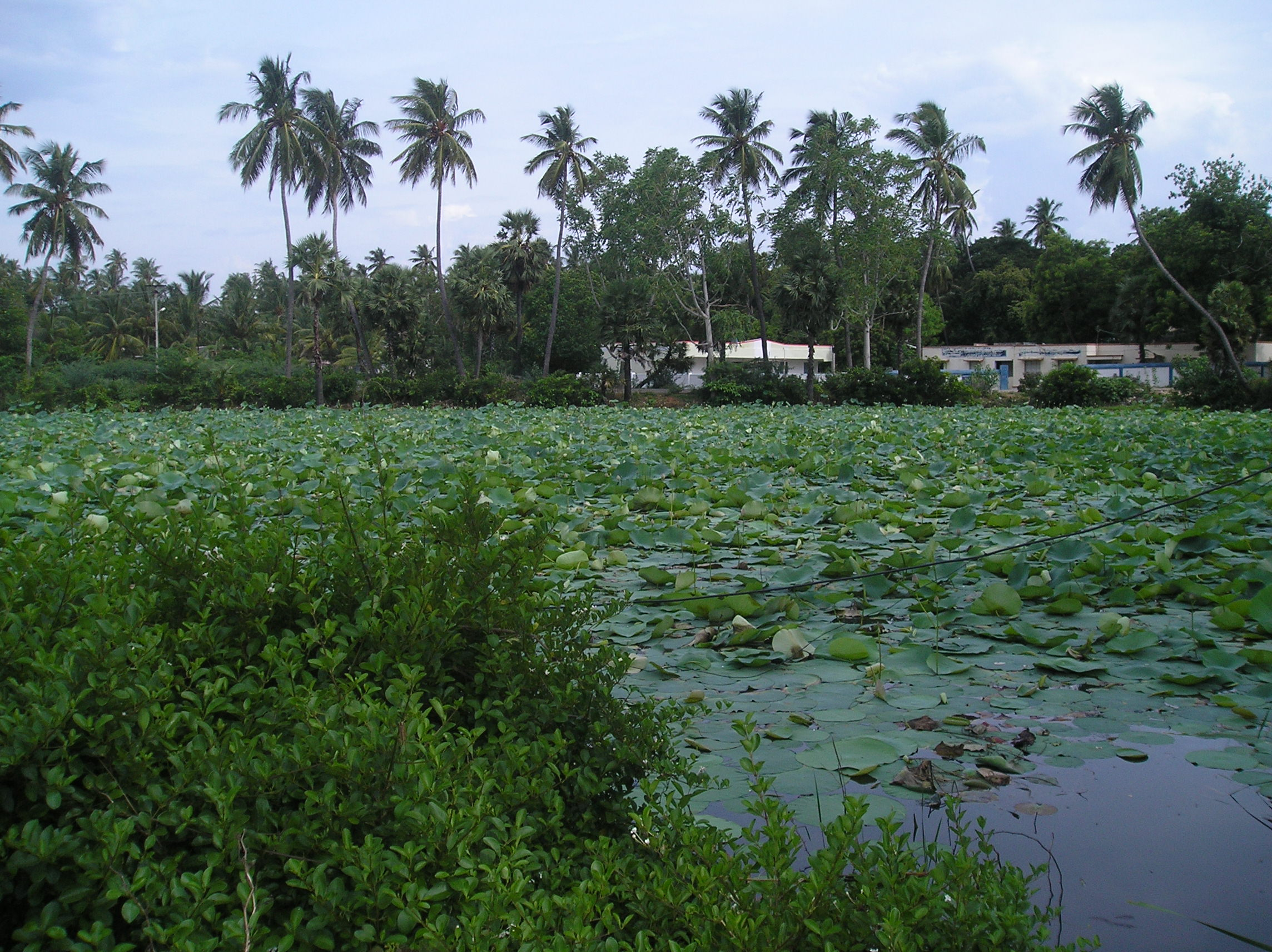
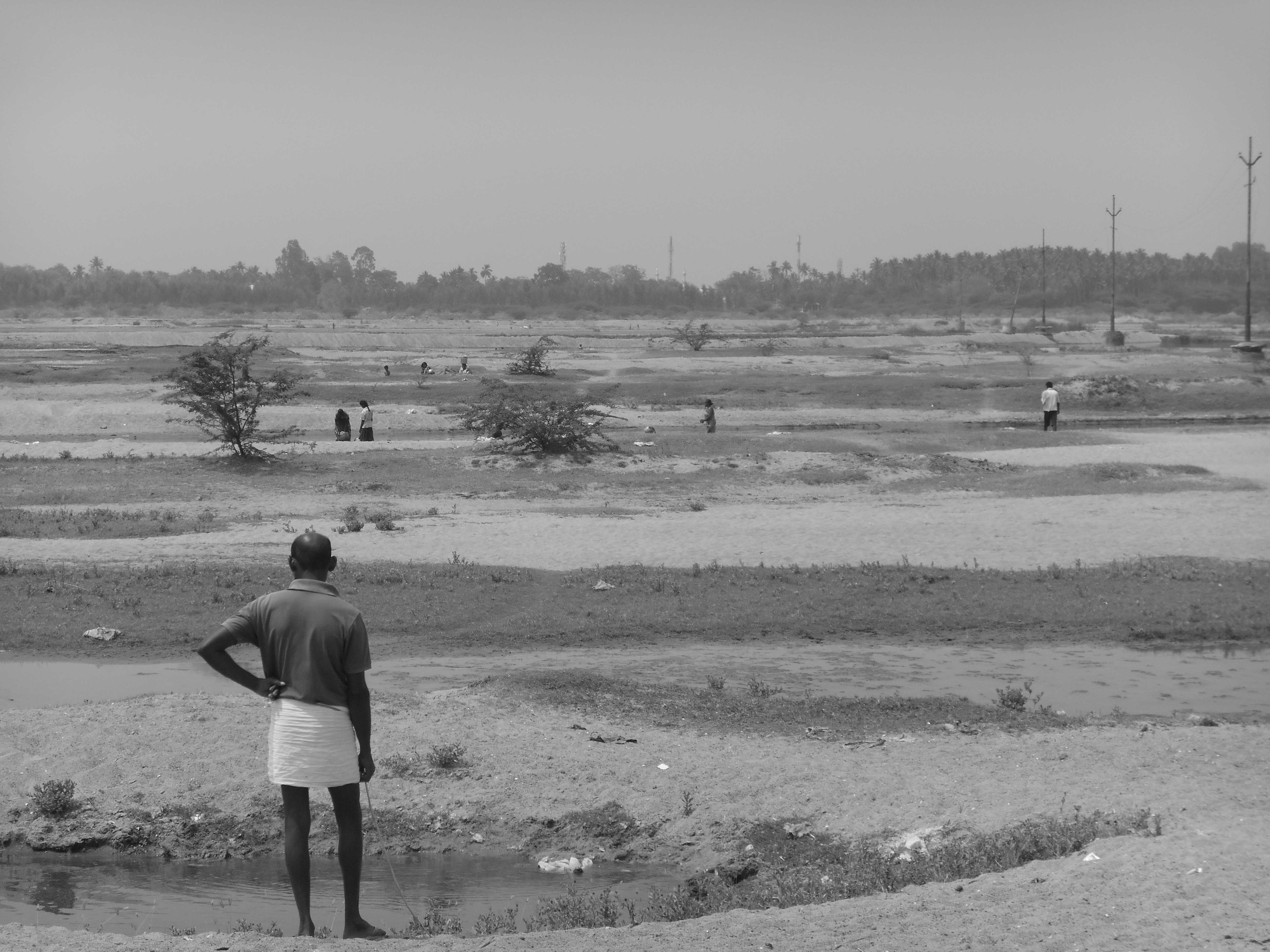
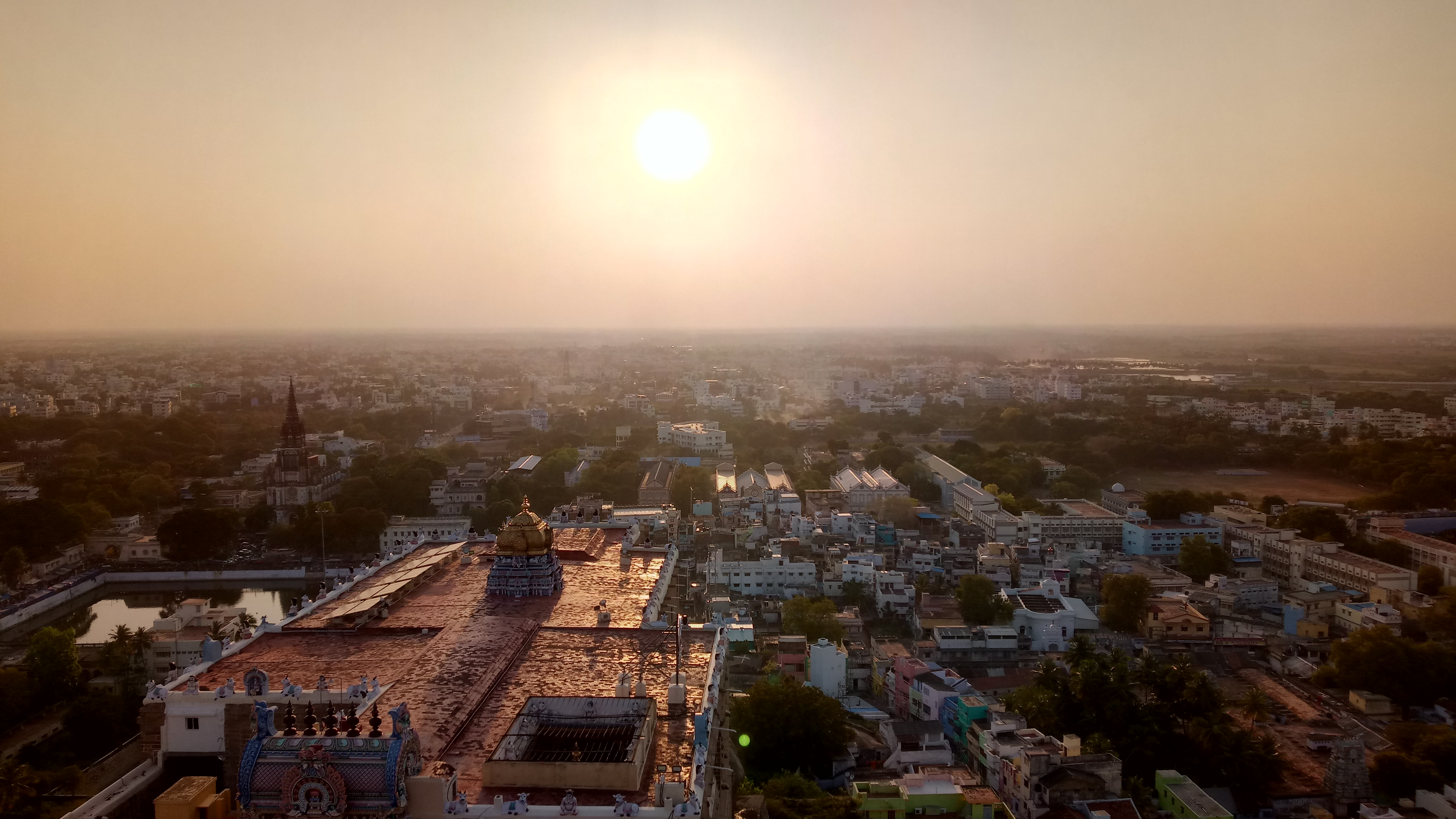
- Clockwise from top-left: Ranganathaswamy Temple in Srirangam, Upper Anaicut, Kaveri in Musiri, view of Tiruchirappalli from Rockfort, ponds in Mutharasanallur

- Location in Tamil Nadu
- Thiruchirappalli district
- Coordinates: 10°47′N 78°41′E
- Country: India
- State: Tamil Nadu
- Municipal corporations: Tiruchirappalli
- Municipalities: Thuraiyur, Manapparai, Thuvakudi, Lalgudi, Musiri
- Town panchayats: Balakrishnampatti, Kallakudi, Kattuputhur, Koothappar, Manachanallur, Mettupalayam, Ponnampatti, Poovalur, Pullambadi, South Kannanur, Sirugamani, Thathaiyangarpet, Thottiyam, Uppiliapuram, Pettavaithalai, Vairichettipalayam
- divisions: Tiruchirappalli division, Lalgudi division, Musiri division, Srirangam division
- Headquarters: Tiruchirapalli
- Talukas: Lalgudi taluk, Manachanallur taluk, Manapparai taluk, Marungapuri taluk, Musiri taluk, Srirangam taluk, Thiruverumbur taluk, Thottiyam taluk, Thuraiyur taluk, Tiruchirappalli West taluk, Tiruchirappalli East taluk

Government
  - Collector: V. Saravanan, IAS
  - Superintendent of Police: S. Selvanagarathinam, IPS
  - Assistant Collector: J. E. Padmaja, IAS

Area
  - Total: 4,403.83 km^{2} (1,700.33 sq mi)
  - Rank: 10th
- Elevation: 88 m (289 ft)

Population (2011)
  - Total: 2,722,290
  - Rank: 6th
  - Density: 618.164/km^{2} (1,601.04/sq mi)

Languages
  - Official: Tamil
- Time zone: UTC+5:30 (IST)
- PIN: 620 xxx and 621 xxx
- Telephone code: 0431
- ISO 3166 code: [[ISO 3166-2:IN|]]
- Vehicle registration: TN-45, TN-48, TN-81
- Central location: 10°47′N 78°41′E
- Website: tiruchirappalli.nic.in

Tiruchirappalli district is one of the 38 districts, located along the Kaveri River, in Tamil Nadu, India. The headquarters of the district is the city of Tiruchirappalli.

During the British Raj, the district was referred to as Trichinopoly, and was a district of the Madras Presidency; it was renamed upon India's declaration of independence in 1947. The district is spread over an area of 4,404 square kilometres (1,700 sq mi) and had a population of 2,722,290 in 2011.

== Geography ==
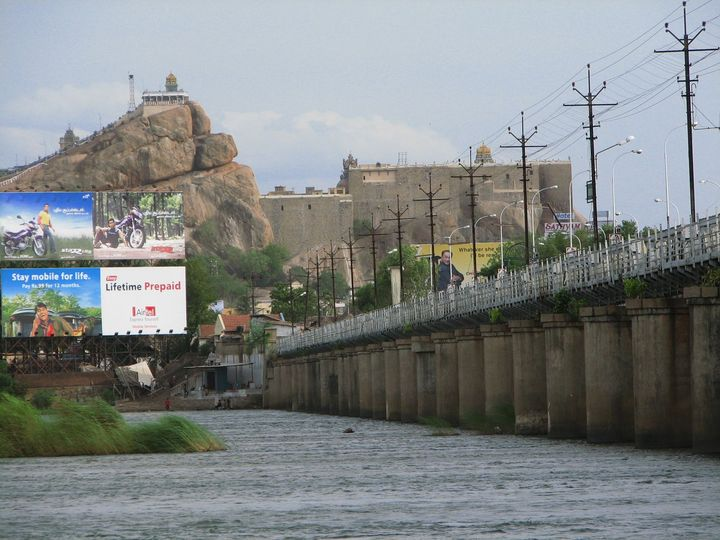
Kaveri river and Rockfort at Tiruchirapalli

Tiruchirappalli district lies almost at the exact centre of Tamil Nadu. The district has an area of 4,404 square kilometres. It is bounded in the north by Salem district, Northwest by Namakkal district, in the Northeast by Perambalur District, East by Ariyalur district and Thanjavur District, in the southeast by Pudukkottai district and Sivagangai district, in the south by Madurai district, in the southwest by Dindigul district and, in the west by Karur district. The district shares its borders with 10 other districts, the highest for any district in the state. The Kaveri river flows through the length of the district and is the principal source of irrigation and drinking water.

Kolli Hills form the boundary of Tiruchirapalli and Namakkal districts and Pachaimalai Hills form the Boundary of Salem and Perambalur district with Tiruchirapalli district in the North and North East.

The North most and South most parts of the district are hilly, central part of the district is Kaveri plains. Trichy district is diverse in landscape, mixture of Fertile, Delta, Valleys, Hilly areas, Semi Arid Zones. Central part of the district is fertile due to river Kaveri flowing through this district, by splitting the district into North and South. North Central and South Central part of the district is Semi arid and drought prone area, receives less rainfall. Evergreen Pachaimalai Hills and Kolli Hills form the Stunning and Enchanting Valley in between these two hills. Falls and Streams from these two hills fills up the lakes in valley areas and makes the land irrigated and Fertile.

Pachaimalai Hills receives high rain fall than average during both Northeast Monsoon as well as Southwest Monsoon, which makes these hills Greener throughout the year and gives a cool climate.

== Demographics ==
Historical population

Year	Pop.	±% p.a.
1901	807,320	—
1911	876,070	+0.82%
1921	912,177	+0.40%
1931	918,342	+0.07%

Year	Pop.	±% p.a.
1941	1,035,927	+1.21%
1951	1,184,158	+1.35%
1961	1,304,039	+0.97%
1971	1,650,768	+2.39%

Year	Pop.	±% p.a.
1981	1,900,566	+1.42%
1991	2,196,473	+1.46%
2001	2,418,366	+0.97%
2011	2,722,290	+1.19%

According to 2011 census, Tiruchirappalli district had a population of 2,722,290 with a sex-ratio of 1,013 females for every 1,000 males, much above the national average of 929. 49.15% of the population lives in urban areas. A total of 272,456 were under the age of six, constituting 139,946 males and 132,510 females. Scheduled Castes and Scheduled Tribes accounted for 17.14% and 0.67% of the population respectively. The average literacy of the district was 74.9%, compared to the national average of 72.99%. The district had a total of 698,404 households. There were a total of 1,213,979 workers, comprising 161,657 cultivators, 319,720 main agricultural labourers, 25,174 in house hold industries, 575,778 other workers, 131,650 marginal workers, 9,012 marginal cultivators, 59,062 marginal agricultural labourers, 5,212 marginal workers in household industries and 58,364 other marginal workers.

Religions in Tiruchirappalli district (2011)
Religion	Percent
Hinduism	83.73%
Christianity	9.04%
Islam	7.01%
Other or not stated	0.22%

Languages of Tiruchirappalli district (2011)
1. Tamil (96.7%)
2. Telugu (2.08%)
3. Others (1.25%)

At the time of the 2011 census, 95.67% of the population spoke Tamil, 2.08% Telugu .

== Politics ==
District	No.	Constituency	Name	Party	Alliance	Remarks
Tiruchirappalli	138	Manapparai	R. Kathiravan	TVK	TVK+	
Tiruchirappalli	139	Srirangam	S. Ramesh	TVK	TVK+	Cabinet Minister
Tiruchirappalli	140	Tiruchirappalli West	K. N. Nehru	DMK	SPA	Deputy Leader of the Opposition
Tiruchirappalli	141	Tiruchirappalli East	C. Joseph Vijay	TVK	TVK+	
Tiruchirappalli	141	Tiruchirappalli East	Vacant			On 10 May 2026, resigned from office and retained the Perambur Assembly constituency
Tiruchirappalli	142	Thiruverumbur	Navalpattu S. Viji	TVK	TVK+	
Tiruchirappalli	143	Lalgudi	Leema Rose Martin	AIADMK	AIADMK+	Supported TVK; Later declared support for EPS
Tiruchirappalli	144	Manachanallur	S. Kathiravan	DMK	SPA	
Tiruchirappalli	145	Musiri	M. Vignesh	TVK	TVK+	
Tiruchirappalli	146	Thuraiyur (SC)	M. Ravisankar	TVK	TVK+	Deputy Speaker

== Taluks ==
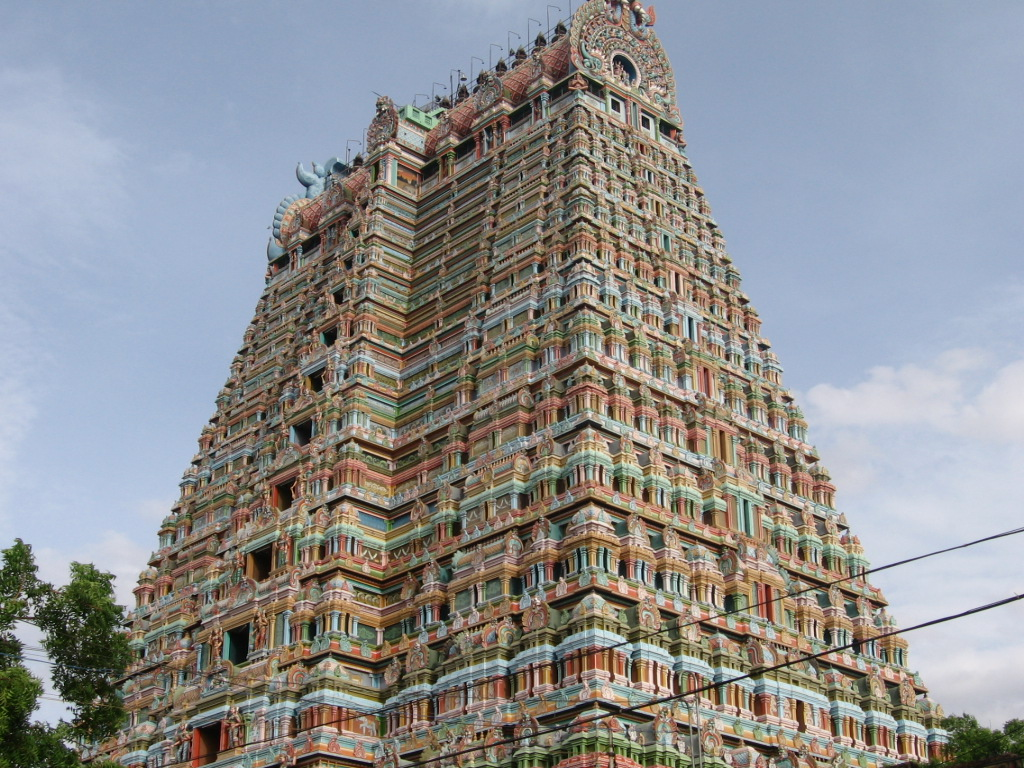
Srirangam Temple Gopuram

In 2013, Tiruchirappalli district went from nine taluks to eleven taluks.

- Thuraiyur taluk
- Manapparai taluk
- Marungapuri taluk
- Srirangam taluk
- Tiruchirappalli West taluk
- Tiruchirappalli East taluk
- Thiruverumbur taluk
- Lalgudi taluk
- Manachanallur taluk
- Musiri taluk
- Thottiyam taluk

== Urban centres ==
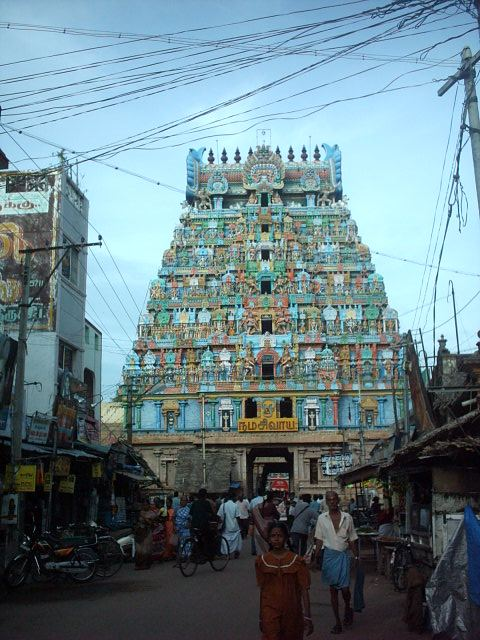
Thiruvanaikaval Temple at Tiruchirapalli

Tiruchirappalli District consists of the following urban centres:

- Trichy City

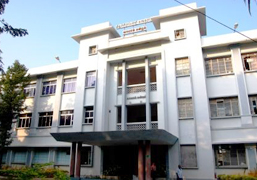
Headquarters of Tiruchirappalli City Municipal Corporation

- Thuraiyur town
- Manapparai town
- Thuvakudi town
- Lalgudi town
- Musiri town
- Manachanallur city municipality
- Thottiyam town panchayat
- Uppiliapuram Town panchayat
- Samayaburam city municipality
- S. Kannanur town
- pullambadi town Panchayat
- kaatuputhur town Panchayat
- Thiruverumbur city municipality
- pettavaithalai town Panchayat
- Sirugamani town panchayat
- Navalurkuttapattu panchayat
- Mettupalayam town panchayat
- Vairichettipalayam town panchayat
- Balakrishnampatti town panchayat
- Thathaiyangarpet town panchayat
- Thandalaiputhur panchayat

== Major industries ==
- Bharat Heavy Electricals Limited (BHEL)
- High Energy Projectile Factory (HEPF)
- Golden Rock Railway Workshop
- Ordnance Factory Tiruchirappalli
- Light and heavy engineering
- Leather Tanneries
- Food Processing
- Sugar Mills
- (Traditional) Cigar Making (village) Industries
- Hosiery and garments (to a small extent)
- IT/BPO
- Manufacturing of Synthetic Stones for Jewelry

== Natural resources and water bodies ==
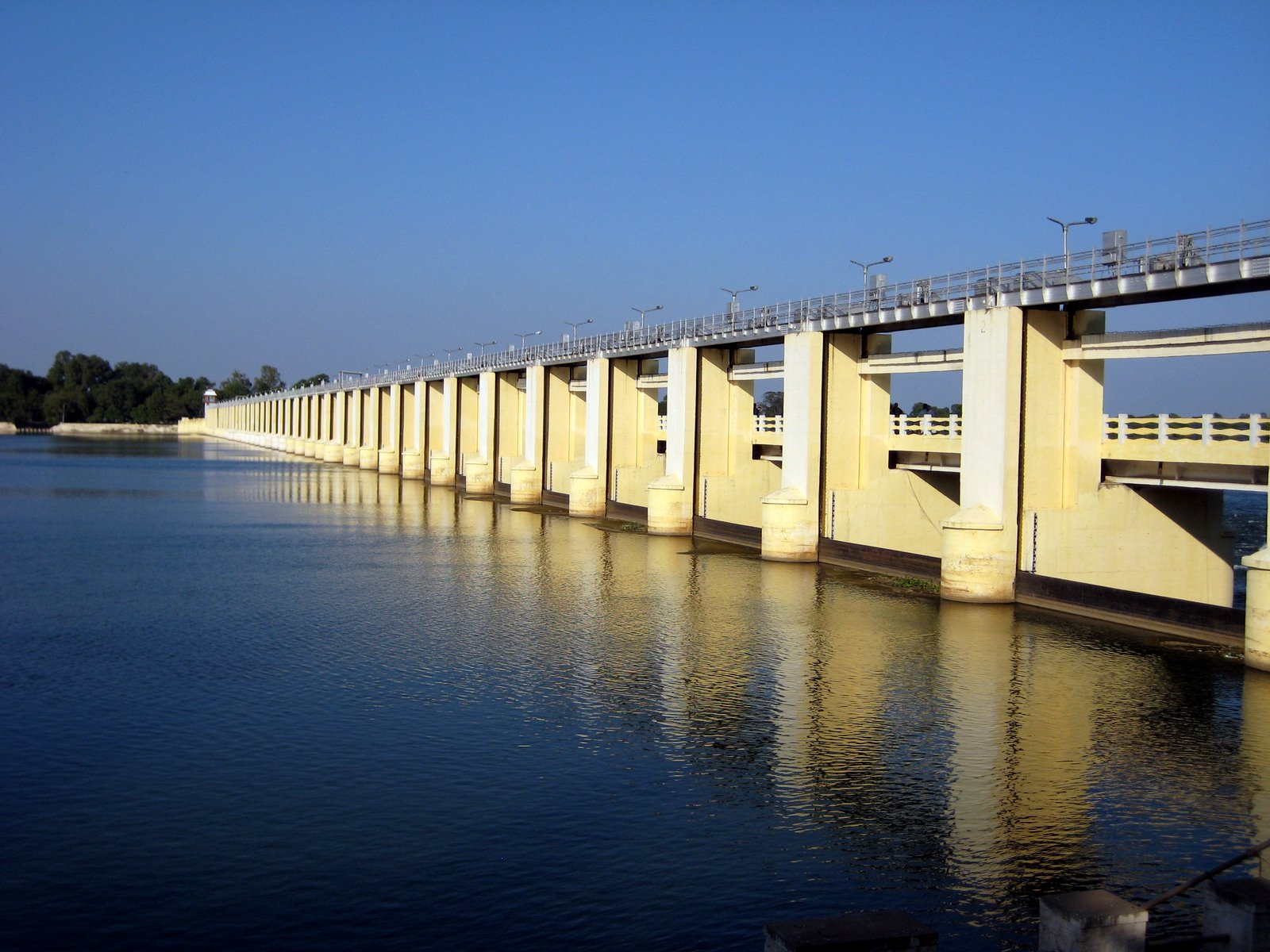
Upper Anaicut or Mukkombu

The major rivers are the River Kaveri and the River Kollidam. The important rivers across city is Koraiyar, Uyyakondan and Kudamuruti rivers.

== Agriculture ==
The district has a large cattle and poultry population with agriculture workers in the smaller villages like Kalpalayathanpatti.

The rivers Kaveri and Kollidam start branching out to form the Kaveri delta irrigating vast tracts of land in the district. The major crops are rice (vast tracts); sugarcane (vast tracts); banana/plantain; coconut; cotton (small tracts); betel; maize; and groundnut.

Trichirapalli district is well known for all varieties of Banana Cultivation. Banana research centre is located in Tiruchirapalli Agricultural University. National Research Centre for Banana, ICAR NRB is also located in Trichy. The district is also well known for Sugarcane Plantation, and Agriculture Research Centre for Sugarcane is located in Sirugamani.

Coffee, Hill Jackfruit, Cassava, mountain crops are grown in the Pachaimalai Hills of Tiruchirapalli district.

== Divya Desam Temples ==
The first five divya desam temples are located in Tiruchirappalli district.

1. Srirangam Ranganathaswamy Temple (1st Divya Desam)
2. Azhagiya Manavala Perumal Temple (2nd Divya Desam)
3. Uthamar Kovil (3rd Divya Desam)
4. Pundarikakshan Perumal Temple (4th Divya Desam)
5. Sundararaja Perumal temple (5th Divya Desam)
