= List of villages in Tiruchirappalli district =

This is an alphabetical list of villages in Tiruchirappalli district, Tamil Nadu, India.

== A ==
- Adavathur East
- Adavathur West
- Adhanur
- Agaram
- Alathur
- Allur
- Alundur
- Amayapuram
- Anbil
- Andanallur
- Appananallur
- Arasangudy
- Asur
- Azad Road

== B-E ==
- Balakrishnampatti
- Dharmanathapuram
- Edangimangalam Vellanur
- Elandapatti
- Eachampatti
- Elangakurichy
- Ellakudy
- Elur Pudupatti

== I-J ==
- Iluppaiyur
- Inam Kulathur
- Jeeyapuram

== K ==
- Kadiyakurichy
- Kallakudi
- Kalpalayam
- Kalpalayathanpatti
- Kandalur
- Kannanurpalayam
- Karattuppatti
- Kattuputhur
- Kilakurichy
- Kilamullakudy
- Kiliyur
- Konalai
- Kulumani
- Kumaravayalur
- Kumbakudy
- Kuvalakkudy

== M ==
- M.Karuppampatti
- Malvoy
- Manamedu Trichy
- Maniyankurichy
- Manjakkorai
- Manpidimangalam
- Maruvathur
- Mettupalayam
- Mudikandam
- Mullikarumbur
- Mutharasanallur

== N-O ==
- Nachikurichy
- Nagamangalam
- Nambukurichi
- Natarajapuram
- Navalpattu
- Navalurkottapattu
- Olaiyur

== P ==
- Paganur
- Palaganangudy
- Palancavery
- Palur
- Panayakurichy
- Paneyapuram
- Pangayarselvi
- Pathalapattai
- Periakaruppur
- Periyanayakichatram
- Perungamani
- Perungudi
- Perur
- Peruvalla Nallur
- Podavur
- Ponnampatti
- Poovalur
- Pukkathurai
- Puliancholai
- Pullambadi
- Purathakudi
- Puthanampatti

== S ==
- Samayapuram
- Sengattuppatti
- Sethurapatti
- Sholamadevi
- Sholanganallur
- Sirugamani
- Somarasampettai
- Sooriyur

== T ==
- Tannirpalli
- Thayanur
- Thirumangalam
- Thirupparaithurai
- Thiruppattur
- Thiruthalaiyur
- Thiruthiyamalai
- Thiruvallarai
- Tiruchendurai
- Tirunedunkulam

== U-V ==
- Uppiliapuram
- Uthamsevi
- Valavandankottai
- Velampatti
- Vengur
