= Nagamangalam =

Nagamangalam may refer to any of the following villages in Tamil Nadu, India:

- Nagamangalam, Ariyalur district
- Nagamangalam, Krishnagiri district
- Nagamangalam, Sivaganga district
- Nagamangalam, Tiruchirappalli district
