= Palur (disambiguation) =

Palur is a village in Kanchipuram district in Tamil Nadu of India.

Palur may also refer to:

- Palur, Tiruchirappalli district, India
- Palur, Minab, Iran
- Palur, Rudan, Iran
- Palur railway station, Indonesia
