= Iluppaiyur =

Iluppaiyur may refer to:

- Iluppaiyur, Tiruchirappalli district, Tamil Nadu, India
- Iluppaiyur, Virudhunagar district, Tamil Nadu, India
