= Netroddharakaswami Temple =

Hindu temple in Panaiyapuram, India

Coordinates: 12°00′28″N 79°32′12″E

Netroddharakaswami Temple (நேத்ரோதாரகாஸ்வாமி கோயில்) is a Hindu temple located at Panaiyapuram in the Viluppuram district of Tamil Nadu, India. The presiding deity is Shiva and the main idol is a Shiva Linga. It is classified as a Paadal Petra Sthalam.

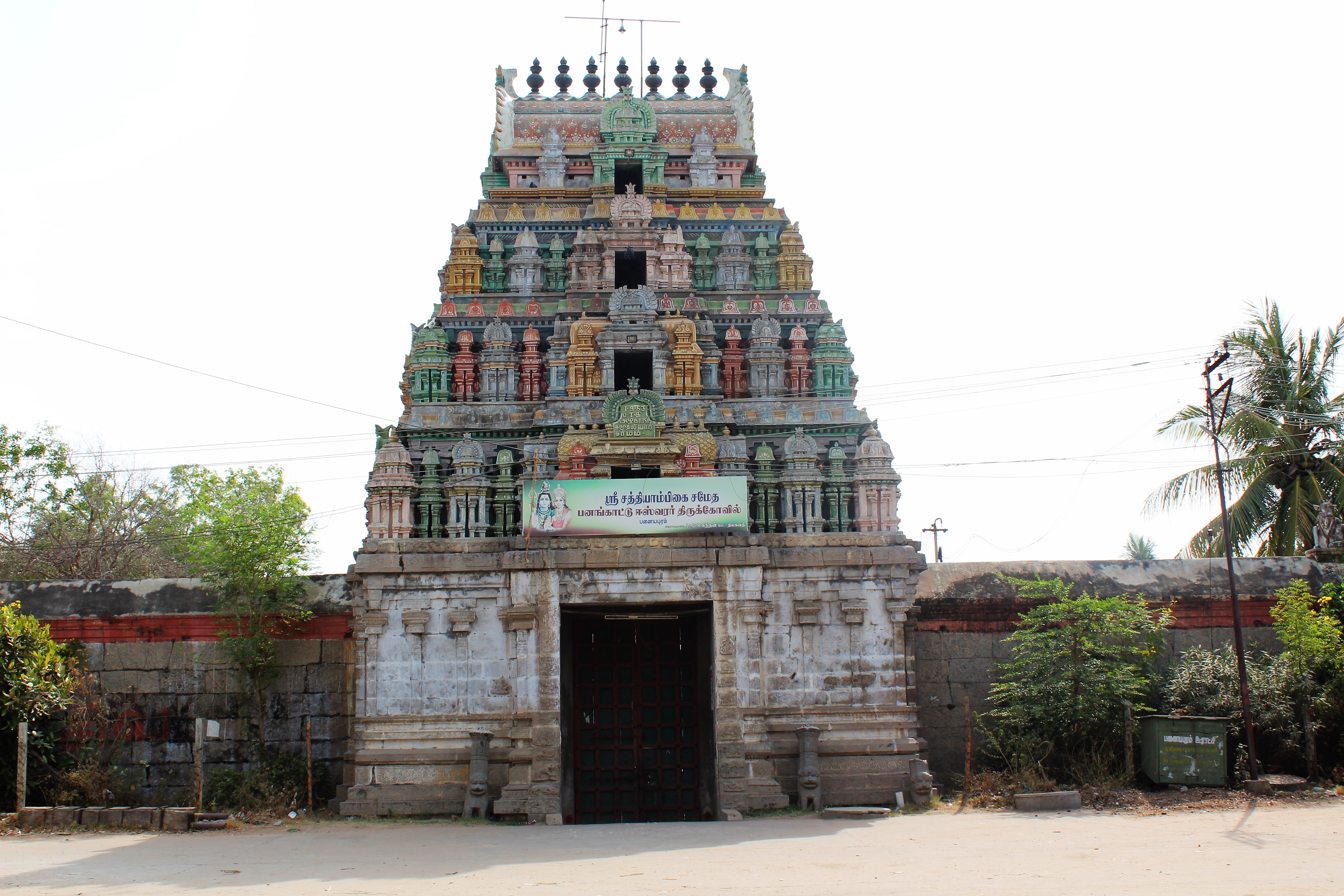

== History ==
The Netroddharakaswami Temple is one of the shrines of the 275 Paadal Petra Sthalams. The temple was constructed by the Medieval Chola king Rajendra Chola I at the beginning of the 11th century AD in honour of his assistant, Paravai, in whose honour the surrounding village was named Paravaipuram. However, an older temple is believed to have existed at the place.

The temple complex has inscriptions by Rajendra Chola I, Rajendra Chola II, Adhirajendra Chola and Kulothunga Chola I.

== Significance ==
According to Indian archaeologist R. Nagaswamy, the Saivite saint Sambandar had sung praises of the temple.

When the decision was taken to widen the National Highway NH45, there were apprehensions that the temple would be demolished. However, the National Highways Authority of India (NHAI) decided to spare the temple and stopped plans to widen the highway.

== External list ==
- "NHAI spares 1,300 year old temple". The Hindu. 22 January 2013.
