= Palur, Iran =

Palur (Persian: پالور), in Iran, may refer to:

- Palur, Minab
- Palur, Rudan
