= Malvy =

Malvy is a surname. Notable people with the surname include:

- Martin Malvy (born 1936), French politician
- Louis-Jean Malvy (1875–1949), Interior Minister of France in 1914

== See also ==
- Malvoy
