= K. K. Pillay =

Indian historian (1905-1981)

Kolappa Kanakasabhapathi Pillay
- Born: 3 April 1905; Alloor, Southern Division, Travancore
- Died: 26 September 1981 (aged 76); Madras, India
- Occupation(s): Historian, Academic, professor, author

Kolappa Kanakasabhapathy Pillay (3 April 1905 – 26 September 1981) was an Indian historian who headed the Department of Indian history at the University of Madras from 1954 to 1966. He also served as a President of the Indian History Congress and as the founder-President of the South Indian History Congress.

== Biography ==
Pillay was born on 3 April 1905 to Kolappa Pillay and Parvathi, a Tamil-speaking couple in the village of Aloor in the Kalkulam taluk in the Southern division of Travancore state (presently in Kanyakumari district of Tamil Nadu). He was educated at the English High School at Kottar and the Scott Christian College in Nagercoil. After graduating, Pillay worked as a lecturer in Government College, Kumbakonam. Later, he joined the faculty of the Presidency College, Madras as Professor before moving to the University of Madras.

In 1948, Pillay obtained a doctorate from the University of Oxford for his thesis on "Local Self-Government in Madras Presidency, 1850-1919". He also won a D. Litt. in 1953 for his paper "The Suchindram Temple". Pillay headed the Department of Indian History and Archaeology at the University of Madras from 1954 to 1959 and the Department of Indian History from 1959 to 1966. In 1966, Pillay was made head of the newly created Department of Social Sciencies and Area Studies, a position he held till 1971. In 1972, Pillay succeeded K. A. Nilakanta Sastri as the Director of UNESCO's Institute of Traditional Cultures of South East Asia. Under his stewardship, the institute conducted two conferences one in 1977 and 1978. Pillay died on 26 September 1981 at the age of 76.

== Works ==
- Pillay, K. K. (1948). Local Self-Government in Madras Presidency, 1850-1919. University of Oxford.
- Pillay, K. K. (1953). The Suchindram Temple. Kalakshetra Publications.
- Pillay, K. K. (1957). History of higher education in South India 1857-1957. University of Madras.
- Pillay, K. K. (1957). Prof P. Sundaram Pillai Commemoration Volume.
- Pillay, K. K. (1963). South India and Ceylon. University of Madras.
- Pillay, K. K. (1967). History of the Tamil press.
- Pillay, K. K. (1969). A social history of the Tamils. University of Madras.
- Pillay, K. K. (1973). The caste system in Tamil Nadu. MJP Publishers.
- Pillay, K. K. (1975). The early history of Nanjil Nadu. University of Madras.
- Pillay, K. K. (1977). History of Tamil Nadu: Her people and culture. Tamil Nadu Textbook Society.
- Pillay, K. K. (1979). Historical heritage of the Tamils. MJP Publishers.
- Pillay, K. K. (1979). Studies in Indian history: with special reference to Tamil Nadu. K. K. Pillay.
