= Vadathirthesvarar Temple, Andanallur =

Temple in Tamil Nadu, India

Vadathirthesvarar Temple, Andanallur, is a Siva temple in Andanallur in Trichy District in Tamil Nadu (India).

== Vaippu Sthalam ==
It is one of the shrines of the Vaippu Sthalams. This temple is found at Andanallur near Tiruchendurai in Trichy-Karur road.

== Presiding deity ==
The presiding deity Vadathirthesvarar and Alandurai Mahadevar. His consort is known as Balasundari and Balasoundaranayaki. The niches of the karnakutas of the first tala contains images of a kneeling man on the left and a kneeling lady in the right. Such a feature is otherwise found in Neyyadiappar Temple, Tillaistanam and Dandeeswarar Temple in Velachery.

== Prakara ==
This temple belongs to the period of Parantaka Chola. In the Prakaram shrines of Vinayaka, Subramania Gajalakshmi, Navagraha, Chandra, Surya and Bairava are found.
