= Dandeeswarar Temple =

Temple in Tamil Nadu, India

Dhandeeswarar Temple
- Location in Tamil Nadu

Religion
- Affiliation: Hinduism
- District: Chennai
- Deity: Dhandeeswarar(Shiva)

Location
- State: Tamil Nadu
- Country: India
- Coordinates: 12°50′46″N 80°03′53″E

Architecture
- Type: Dravidian architecture

Dhandeeswarar Temple (Shri Dhandeeswarar Temple) is a Shiva temple situated in Velachery, a suburb of Chennai. The temple was built during the Pallava reign and was repaired and rebuilt during the Chola reign. The temple complex consists of a main temple complex and a tank, and is 2 kilometers towards the east from Guru Nanak College on the Velachery main road. This temple is administered by the HR & CE Department of the Government of Tamil Nadu.

== Mythology ==
The Temple traces its mythology to that of Lord Yama (God of Death) who is said to have installed this Lingam and prayed to Lord Shiva for forgiveness and restoration of his strength after he was kicked on his chest by Lord Shiva in Thirukadavur at the behest of saving the life of Sage Markandeya. Lord Yama having lost his strength is said to have created a Tank (Yama Theertham) and installed this Lingam and had fervently prayed to Lord Shiva for forgiveness and restoration of his strength so that he can carry out his duties in full measure. Pleased by his prayers Lord Shiva is said to have granted a Staff (Dhandam) to Lord Yama in this place and restored his strength and hence the name Dhandeeswarar - or bestower of mythical staff. The Lords Consort is Goddess Karunambika (Merciful Mother).

The other important incident associated here is that the 4 Vedas came and prayed to this Lord and regained their strength after they were taken by Hiranyaksha and were kept immersed in Sea before being rescued by Lord Vishnu in Varaha avatar. Thus this place is an apt one for any one wishing to regain their lost strength and vitality. The name Velachery is said to be corruption of Veda Shreni (Place of Vedas).

== The Temple ==
The Temple sports a 5 Tier Vimana and has separate shrines for Ganapati, Subrahmanya and Shasta as well. We can find the idols of Lord Surya, Bhairavar and many other deities including 63 Nayanmars.

The Temple however, has been badly maintained in the past as one can see broken pillars and remnants of carvings spewed around. The Pillars have Tamil and Devnagri etchings. The Temple has however seen good patronage in the recent times after Velachery has become an active suburb.

It is said that the rays of the Sun would fall on the Lingam on the exact date of Tamil New Year and this is not happening now as High rises have been built around the Temple. The Temple poojas starts from about 6.30 am and go on up to 11.30 am and is open again from 4 pm to 8.30 pm daily. The niches of the karnakutas of the first tala contains images of a kneeling man on the left and a kneeling lady in the right. Such a feature is otherwise found in Neyyadiappar Temple, Tillaistanam and Vadathirthesvarar Temple, Andanallur in Tiruchendurai.
