= Ellakudy =

- village
- Interactive map of Ellakudy
- Coordinates: 10°48′22″N 78°45′01″E
- Country: India
- State: Tamil Nadu
- District: Tiruchirappalli

Population (2001)
  - Total: 4,125

Languages
  - Official: Tamil
- Time zone: UTC+5:30 (IST)

Ellakudy is a village in Tiruchirappalli taluk of Tiruchirappalli district, Tamil Nadu, India. It was merged with the Tiruchirappalli Corporation in 2011.

== Demographics ==
As per the 2001 census, Ellakudy had a population of 4125 with 2093 males and 2032 females. The sex ratio was 971 and the literacy rate, 94.34.
