= Sethurapatti, Tiruchirappalli district =

Sethurapatti
- village
- Country: India
- State: Tamil Nadu
- District: Tiruchirappalli

Population (2001)
  - Total: 2,501

Languages
  - Official: Tamil
- Time zone: UTC+5:30 (IST)

Sethurapatti is a village in the Srirangam taluk of Tiruchirappalli district in Tamil Nadu, India.

== Demographics ==
As per the 2001 census, Sethurapatti had a population of 2,501 with 1,256 males and 1,245 females. The sex ratio was 991 and the literacy rate, 58.62.
