= Trichy Engineering College =

Engineering college in Trichy, India

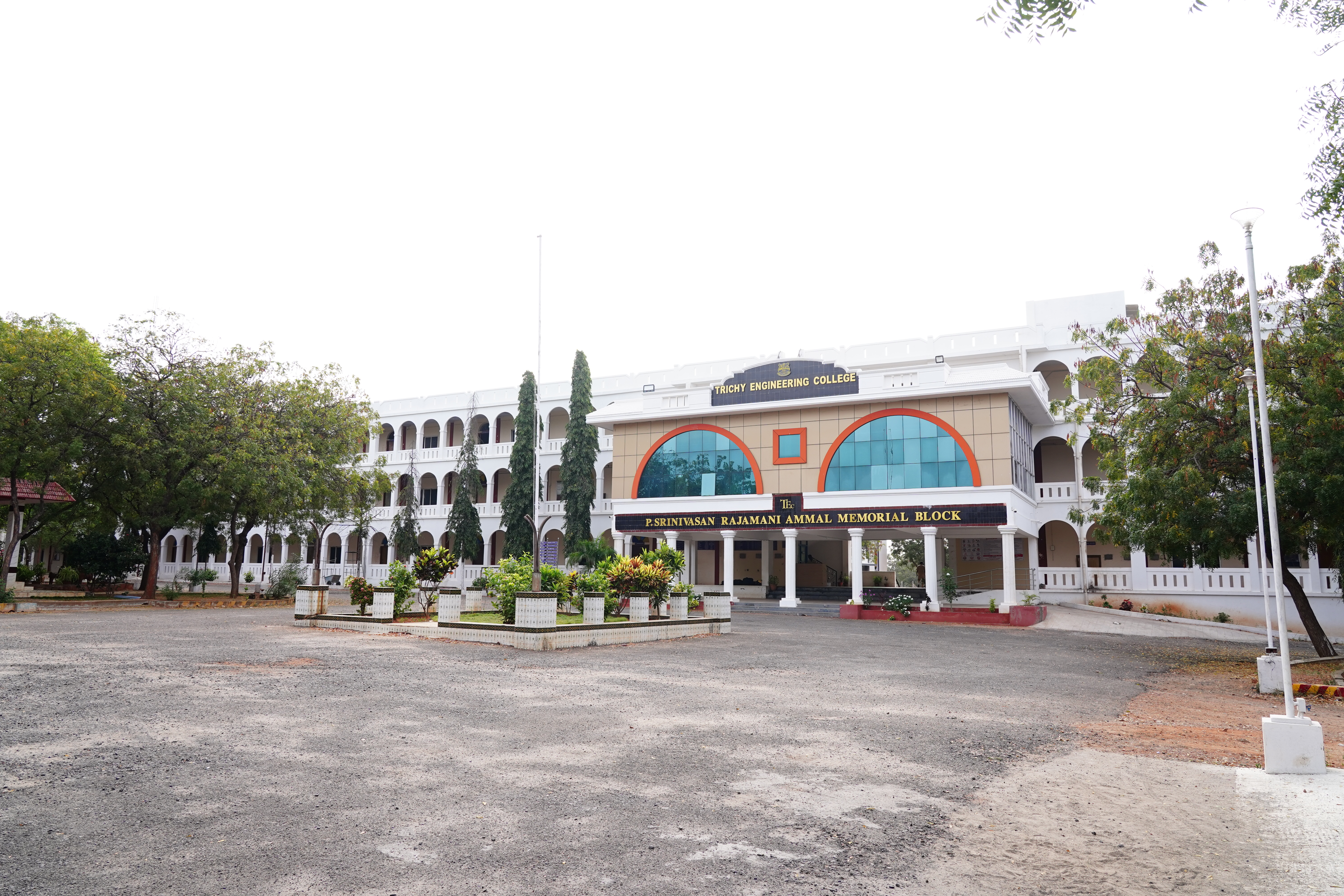
- Type: Private
- Established: 1998
- Affiliations: Anna University
- Chairperson: Dr.Sujatha Subramaniam
- Principal: Dr.D.Loganathan
- Location: Sivagnanam Nagar, Trichy-Chennai National Highway, Konalai, Tiruchirappalli, Tamil Nadu, 621105, India; 10.982587°N 78.775245°E
- Campus: 57 acres (0.2 km^{2})
- Website: trichyengg.ac.in

Trichy Engineering College (TEC) is a College of Engineering located in Konalai, a village on the Tiruchirappalli to Chennai national highway, in Tamil Nadu, India. It was established in 1998. It is affiliated with Anna University. As of January 2011 it offers five undergraduate courses. It is one of the two colleges in Tiruchirappalli which has a department of Mechatronics. TEC was founded by Annai Santhiya Educational Health & Charitable Trust, Woraiyur, Tiruchirappalli with the permission of the Government of Tamil Nadu. The Trust, which is dedicated to the cause of promoting technical education as part of its philanthropic scheme, purchased 41.7 acres of land in Konalai Village and established the college.

The college was started by Mr. S. Subramaniam, chairman, Mookambigai College of Engineering, who is also the Secretary of this college. Its main aim is to provide the best engineering education under a disciplined culture to the minority students of Tamil Nadu and the neighbouring states.

== Affiliations ==
TEC is approved by the All India Council for Technical Education (AICTE) and affiliated with Anna University of Technology, Tiruchirappalli. It was previously affiliated with Bharathidasan University.

== Departments ==
The college has nine Departments:

- Department of Computer Science and Engineering.
- Department of Mechanical Engineering.
- Department of Electrical and Electronics Engineering.
- Department of Electronics and Communication Engineering.
- Department of Mechatronics.
- Department of Civil Engineering.
- Department of Artificial Intelligence and Machine Learning.
- Department of Artificial Intelligence and Data Science.

== Facilities ==
TEC facilities include a library of nearly 25,000 books, separate hostels for boys and girls and a canteen inside the campus. Computer resources include nearly 500 computers.
