= Navalurkottapattu =

Navalur Kuttapattu Inam Kuttapattu
- Suburb
- Location in Tamil Nadu, India Navalur Kuttapattu (India)
- Coordinates: 10.755655°N 78.606448°E
- Country: India
- State: Tamil Nadu
- District: Tiruchirappalli
- Named for: The original name of this village is Navalur Kuttapattu. The first name Navalur is a Sub village which located on the other side of the river(ariaaru). The second name Kuttapattu is another greater part. The village is named as kuttapatu because it has lots of lakes and ponds in and around the village. (Kuttapattu = Kuttai + pattu, Kuttai means Pond in Tamil language). Later Navalur and Kuttapattu both villages came under one management and called as Navalur kuttapattu.

Population (2001)
  - Total: 4,943

Languages
  - Official: Tamil
- Time zone: UTC+5:30 (IST)
- PIN: 620009
- Vehicle registration: TN 48
- Website: www.trichycorporation.gov.in

Navalur Kuttapattu is a Suburb and Revenue Divisional headquarters of Srirangam taluk in Tiruchirappalli district, Tamil Nadu, India. It is located 12km to the west of Tiruchirapalli, 4km from Manikandam Union and 365km from State capital Chennai.

== Demographics ==
As per the 2001 census, Navalur Kuttapattu had a population of 4,943 with 2,481 males and 2,462 females. The sex ratio was 992 and the literacy rate, 70.13. Tamil is the Local Language here.

== Educational Institutions in Navalur Kuttapattu ==
- St. Vincent Matriculation Higher Secondary School
- Annai Indira Gandhi Memorial Higher Secondary School
- Bharathidasan University Constituent Arts & Science College
- CARE Institute of Technology
- Care International School
- Don Bosco I.T.I, AMSAM
- Government Higher Secondary School
- Horticultural College and Research Institute for Women
- Priest University
- Shivani School of Business Management
- Shivani Institute of Technology
- Tamil Nadu Agricultural university
- Tamil Nadu National Law School

== Sub Villages in Navalur Kuttapattu ==
- VannanKovil
- Navalur
- Aravangalpatti
- Muthukulam
- Bharathi Nagar
- Anbu Nagar
- Rajeswari Nagar
- Ambedgar Nagar
- Gandhinagar
- Keelakkadu

== Church & Temples ==
- ADAIKALA MATHA CHURCH
- VINAYAGAR TEMPLE
- ARAVAYEE AMMAN TEMPLE
- KUNNIMARATHAN TEMPLE
- MURUGAN TEMPLE
- NOOR NABIGAL PALLIVAASAL

== Political parties ==
- Naam thamizhar Katchi
- ADMK
- DMK
- INC
- AMMK
