= Perur, Tiruchirappalli district =

Perur
- village
- Country: India
- State: Tamil Nadu
- District: Tiruchirappalli

Population (2001)
  - Total: 1,049

Languages
  - Official: Tamil
- Time zone: UTC+5:30 (IST)

Perur is a village in the Srirangam taluk of Tiruchirappalli district in Tamil Nadu, India.

== Demographics ==
As per the 2001 census, Perur had a population of 1,049 with 528 males and 521 females. The sex ratio was 987 and the literacy rate, 76.97.
