= Konalai =

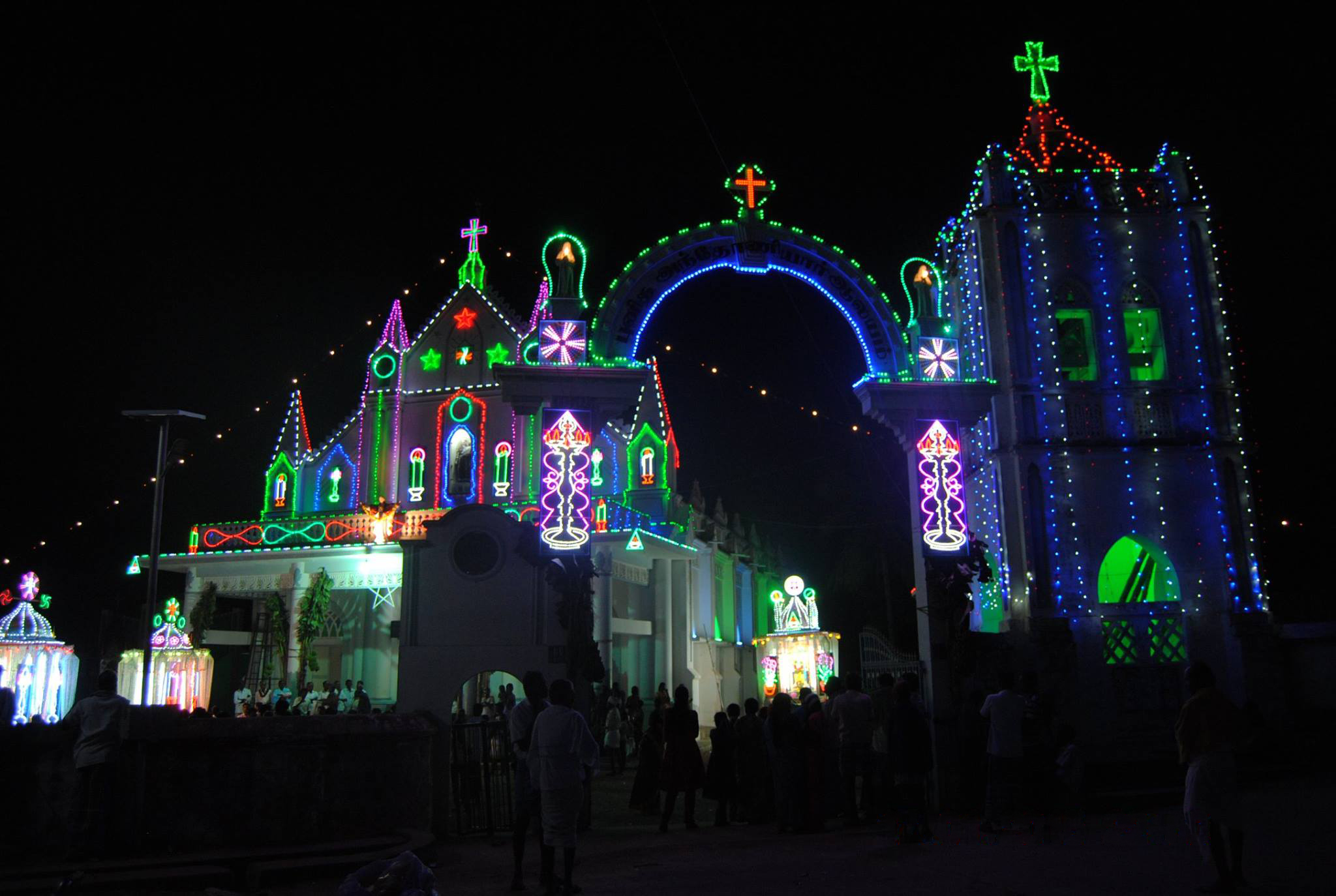
- St. Anthony Church, Konalai, Tiruchirappalli district, Tamil Nadu

- Location within Tamil Nadu
- Coordinates: 10.9844°N 78.7667°E
- Country: India
- State: Tamil Nadu
- District: Tiruchirappalli
- PIN: 621105

Konalai is a village in Manachanallur Taluk, Tiruchirappalli District, in the Indian state of Tamil Nadu. It is 67 meters above sea level with good road connections amidst a network of rivers and waterways north of the Kolladam River. The state capital of Chennai is 331 km northeast with the district headquarters of Tiruchirappalli 22 km to the south and Manachanallur Taluk 14 km southwest. The nearest major railway station to Konalai is in Tiruchirappalli.

== Demographics ==
In 2011, Konalai was inhabited by 1109 families of which 9.9% (110) of the population were children under age six.

2011 Census	Population
Male	2088
Female	2203
Total	4491

The local language is Tamil. Tamil is widely spoken throughout the Taluk.

== Education ==
The Dr. G. Sakunthala College of Nursing, the Universal Teacher Training Institute, Trichy Engineering College, and St. Therasa's Aid are near Konalai. Due to these institutions of higher education, the results yielded are a higher literacy rate for the village (86.81%) relative to the Tamil Nadu region (80.09%). Male literacy (92.31%) exceeds female literacy (81.70%). The schools are mostly run by government.

== Attractions ==
The St. Antony of Padua Church is approximately 116 years old and belongs to the Kumbakonam Diocese. Two festivals are held at the church each year, on 19–21 January and on 12–13 June.

Tsaphah Ministries has a main Church called 'Tsaphah Prophetic Church' near lake.

== Nearby villages and cities ==
Konalai is surrounded by Lalgudi Taluk towards the south, Tiruchirappalli Taluk. Thiruverambur Taluk lies to the South, and Pullambadi Taluk lies to the East. Some notable cities near Konalai include Lalgudi, Tiruchirappalli, Thuraiyur, and Perambalur.

Name	Distance from Konalai
Irungalur	3 kilometers
Ayyampalayam	3 kilometers
Thathamangalam	5 kilometers
Kanniyakudi	5 kilometers
Kariyamanickam	5 kilometers
