= Periakaruppur =

- village
- Country: India
- State: Tamil Nadu
- District: Tiruchirappalli

Population (2001)
  - Total: 1,333

Languages
  - Official: Tamil
- Time zone: UTC+5:30 (IST)

Periyakaruppur is a village in the Srirangam taluk of Tiruchirappalli district in Tamil Nadu, India.

== Demographics ==
As per the 2001 census, Periyakaruppur had a population of 1,333 with 682 males and 651 females. The sex ratio was 955 and the literacy rate, 74.32.
