= Asur, Tiruchirappalli district =

Asur
- village
- Interactive map of Asur
- Coordinates: 10.717459°N 78.855251°E
- Country: India
- State: Tamil Nadu
- District: Tiruchirappalli

Population (2001)
  - Total: 1,850

Languages
  - Official: Tamil
- Time zone: UTC+5:30 (IST)

Asur is a village in Tiruchirappalli taluk of Tiruchirappalli district, Tamil Nadu.

== Demographics ==
As per the 2001 census, Asur had a population of 1,850 with 933 males and 917 females. The sex ratio was 983 and the literacy rate, 70.77.
