= Adavathur East =

- village
- Interactive map of Adavathur East
- Coordinates: 10.807959°N 78.635618°E
- Country: India
- State: Tamil Nadu
- District: Tiruchirappalli

Government
  - Panchayat President: Mr. Saravanan Ramasamy

Population (2001)
  - Total: 4,682

Languages
  - Official: Tamil
- Time zone: UTC+5:30 (IST)

Adavathur East is a part of the city of Tiruchirappalli and located in the Srirangam taluk of Tiruchirappalli district in Tamil Nadu, India.

== History ==
Adavathur East is a small village located in the Srirangam taluk of Tiruchirappalli district in the southern state of Tamil Nadu, India. The village has a rich history dating back over 500 years, with its roots tracing back to the medieval era.

During the 16th century, Adavathur East was part of the Vijayanagar Empire, a vast South Indian empire that dominated much of the Deccan Plateau. The village was a thriving agricultural community, known for its fertile lands and abundant harvests. However, with the decline of the Vijayanagar Empire in the 17th century, Adavathur East came under the control of the Nayak dynasty of Madurai.

Under the Nayak rule, Adavathur East saw significant growth and development, with the construction of several temples, tanks, and other public works. The village also became a center of trade and commerce, with merchants from across South India traveling to Adavathur East to buy and sell goods.

During the British colonial era, Adavathur East was part of the Madras Presidency, and the village saw significant changes in its social and economic fabric. The British introduced modern education and healthcare systems, and the village became more connected to the wider world through improved transportation and communication networks.

Today, Adavathur East is a village, with a population of over 4,000 people. The village has a thriving agricultural sector, with rice, sugarcane, and coconut being the primary crops. In recent years, Adavathur East has also seen significant growth in its tourism industry, with visitors coming to explore the village's rich history and cultural heritage.

== Notable people ==
- The village is led by its mayor, Mr. S. Ramasamy, who has been in office for over a decade. Mr. Ramasamy was born and raised in Adavathur East and has worked tirelessly to improve the village's infrastructure and amenities. Before entering politics, Mr. Ramasamy worked as a schoolteacher and was known for his dedication to his students. As mayor, Mr. Ramasamy has focused on improving healthcare, education, and sanitation in the village. He has also worked to promote tourism, believing that Adavathur East has the potential to become a major tourist destination in the region. Mr. Ramasamy is widely respected by the villagers, who see him as a humble and hardworking leader dedicated to the welfare of his constituents.

== Demographics ==
As per the 2001 census, Adavathur East had a population of 4,682 with 2,339 males and 2,343 females: a sex ratio of 1.002. The literacy rate was 79.12.
