= Perugamani =

Neighbourhood in Tiruchirappalli district, Tamil Nadu, India

- Village
- Location within Tamil Nadu Location within India
- Coordinates: 10°53′18″N 78°32′43″E
- Country: India
- State: Tamil Nadu
- District: Tiruchirappalli

Population (2001)
  - Total: 3,618

Languages
  - Official: Tamil
- Time zone: UTC+5:30 (IST)

Perugamani is a village in the Srirangam taluk of Tiruchirappalli district in Tamil Nadu, India.

== Demographics ==
As per the 2001 census, Perungamani had a population of 3,618 with 1,822 males and 1,796 females. The sex ratio was 986 and the literacy rate, 78.54.
