= Pathalapattai =

Pathalapattai Pathalapattai Pathalapattai
- village
- Nickname: Pathalapattai
- Location in Tamil Nadu, India Pathalapattai (Tamil Nadu)
- Coordinates: 10°48′18″N 78°41′08″E
- Country: India
- State: Tamil Nadu
- District: Tiruchirappalli
- Region: Cauvery Delta

Government
  - Type: Panchayat
  - Body: Tiruchirappalli City Municipal Corporation
  - President: Javan

Area
  - Total: 5 km^{2} (1.9 sq mi)
- Elevation 5: 5 m (16 ft)

Population (2001)
  - Total: 2,740
  - Rank: Metro rank
  - Density: 550/km^{2} (1,400/sq mi)

Languages
  - Official: Tamil
- Time zone: UTC+5:30 (IST)
- PIN: 620013
- Telephone code: 0431
- Vehicle registration: TN-45, TN-48, TN-81, TN-81A
- Website: www.trichycorporation.gov.in

Pathalapattai is a village in Tiruchirappalli taluk of Tiruchirappalli district in Tamil Nadu, India.

== Landmarks ==
Two rivers namely "Kallanai Kaalvaai" and " Vennar" are located in Indalur. There is a very famous Karuppu Swamy Kovil. There are nearly about 10 temples around there.

== Demographics ==
As per the 2001 census, Pathalapattai had a population of 2,740 with 1,351 males and 1,389 females. The sex ratio was 1028 and the literacy rate, 77.72.

== Transportation ==
The nearest railway station is Solagampatti (SGM). Frequent buses are available to Thanjavur, Thiruchhirappalli, Karur, Pudukkottai, Madurai, Chennai and Cochin.
