= Paganur =

- village
- Location in Tamil Nadu, India Paganur (India)
- Coordinates: 10.731650°N 78.599999°E
- Country: India
- State: Tamil Nadu
- District: Tiruchirappalli

Population (2001)
  - Total: 1,999

Languages
  - Official: Tamil
- Time zone: UTC+5:30 (IST)
- PIN: 620009
- Vehicle registration: TN-48

Paganur is a village in the Srirangam taluk of Tiruchirappalli district in Tamil Nadu, India. It is part of Manikandam block.

== Demographics ==
As per the 2001 census, Paganur had a population of 1,999 with 972 males and 1,027 females. The sex ratio was 1057 and the literacy rate, 66.97.
