= Uthamsevi =

- village
- Country: India
- State: Tamil Nadu
- District: Tiruchirappalli

Population (2001)
  - Total: 1,904

Languages
  - Official: Tamil
- Time zone: UTC+5:30 (IST)

Uthamsevi is a village in the Srirangam taluk of Tiruchirappalli district in Tamil Nadu, India.

== Demographics ==
As per the 2001 census, Uthamsevi had a population of 2,009 with 993 males and 1,016 females. The sex ratio was 1023 and the literacy rate, 79.23.
