= Adavathur West =

- village
- Interactive map of Adavathur West
- Coordinates: 10.807959°N 78.635618°E
- Country: India
- State: Tamil Nadu
- District: Tiruchirappalli

Population (2001)
  - Total: 8,748

Languages
  - Official: Tamil
- Time zone: UTC+5:30 (IST)

Adavathur West is a village in Srirangam taluk of Tiruchirappalli district in Tamil Nadu, India.

== Demographics ==
As per the 2001 census, Adavathur West had a population of 8,748 with 4,261 males and 4,487 females. The sex ratio was 1053 and the literacy rate, 72.7.
