= Kuvalakkudy =

- village
- Country: India
- State: Tamil Nadu
- District: Tiruchirappalli

Government
  - Type: Panchayati raj (India)
  - Body: Gram panchayat

Population (2001)
  - Total: 4,190

Languages
  - Official: Tamil
- Time zone: UTC+5:30 (IST)

Kuvalakkudy is a village in Tiruchirappalli taluk of Tiruchirappalli district in Tamil Nadu, India.

== Demographics ==
As per the 2001 census, Kuvalakkudy had a population of 4190 with 2058 males and 2132 females. The sex ratio was 1036 and the literacy rate, 80.16.
