= Nachikurichy =

- village
- Country: India
- State: Tamil Nadu
- District: Tiruchirappalli

Population (2001)
  - Total: 4,145

Languages
  - Official: Tamil
- Time zone: UTC+5:30 (IST)

Nachikurichy is a part of the city of Tiruchirappalli and located in the Srirangam taluk of Tiruchirappalli district in Tamil Nadu, India.

== Demographics ==
As per the 2001 census, Nachikurichy had a population of 4,145 with 2,097 males and 2,048 females. The sex ratio was 977 and the literacy rate, 79.17.
