= Kumbakudy =

- village
- Country: India
- State: Tamil Nadu
- District: Tiruchirappalli

Government
  - Type: Panchayati raj (India)
  - Body: Gram panchayat

Population (2001)
  - Total: 475

Languages
  - Official: Tamil
- Time zone: UTC+5:30 (IST)

Kumbakudy is a village in Tiruchirappalli taluk of Tiruchirappalli district in Tamil Nadu, India.

== Demographics ==
As per the 2001 census, Kumbakudy had a population of 475 with 243 males and 232 females. The sex ratio was 955 and the literacy rate, 79.91.
