= Sholamadevi =

- village
- Country: India
- State: Tamil Nadu
- District: Tiruchirappalli

Population (2001)
  - Total: 2,293

Languages
  - Official: Tamil
- Time zone: UTC+5:30 (IST)

Sholamadevi is a village in Tiruchirappalli taluk of Tiruchirappalli district in Tamil Nadu, India.

== Demographics ==
As per the 2001 census, Sholamadevi had a population of 2,293 with 1,184 males and 1,109 females. The sex ratio was 937 and the literacy rate, 85.32.
