= Kandalur =

Coordinates: 10°41′N 78°47′E

- village
- Interactive map of Kandalur
- Country: India
- State: Tamil Nadu
- District: Tiruchirappalli

Government
  - Type: Panchayati raj (India)
  - Body: Gram panchayat

Population (2001)
  - Total: 1,022

Languages
  - Official: Tamil
- Time zone: UTC+5:30 (IST)

Kandalur is a village in Tiruchirappalli taluk of Tiruchirappalli district in Tamil Nadu, India.

== Demographics ==
As per the 2001 census, Kandalur had a population of 1,022 with 512 males and 510 females. The sex ratio was 996 and the literacy rate, 74.64.
