= Periyanayakichatram =

- Village
- Periyanayakichatram, Tiruchirappalli district, Tamil Nadu
- Coordinates: 10.7530°N 78.5760°E
- Country: India
- State: Tamil Nadu
- District: Tiruchirappalli
- Elevation: 119.23 m (391.2 ft)

Population (2001)
  - Total: 972

Languages
  - Official: Tamil
- Time zone: UTC+5:30 (IST)

Periyanayakichatram is a village in the Srirangam taluk of Tiruchirappalli district in Tamil Nadu, India.

== Demographics ==
As per the 2001 census, Perungamani had a population of 972 with 481 males and 491 females. The sex ratio was 1021 and the literacy rate, 64.85.
