= Sholanganallur =

- village
- Country: India
- State: Tamil Nadu
- District: Tiruchirappalli

Population (2001)
  - Total: 2,922

Languages
  - Official: Tamil
- Time zone: UTC+5:30 (IST)

Sholanganallur is a village in the Srirangam taluk of Tiruchirappalli district in Tamil Nadu, India. Sholanganallur developed by King sholan so that name was bring with this area. Sholangallur is one of the historical place . That famous kulumayi amman thiruvizha happened every year panguni month.thiruvizha happened for 4 days in every year.

== Demographics ==
As per the 2001 census, Sholanganallur had a population of 2,922 with 1,505 males and 1,417 females. The sex ratio was 942 and the literacy rate, 95.31.
