= Kadiyakurichy =

- village
- Interactive map of Kadiyakurichy
- Coordinates: 10°52′47″N 78°36′29″E
- Country: India
- State: Tamil Nadu
- District: Tiruchirappalli

Government
  - Panchayat President: krishnamoorthy s (2020-2025)

Area
  - Total: 2 km^{2} (0.77 sq mi)

Population (2001)
  - Total: 902
  - Density: 450/km^{2} (1,200/sq mi)

Languages
  - Official: Tamil
- Time zone: UTC+5:30 (IST)
- Postal code: 639101

Kadiyakurichy is a village in the Srirangam taluk of Tiruchirappalli district in Tamil Nadu, India.

== Demographics ==
As per the 2001 census, kadiyakurichi had a population of 902 with 451 males and 451 females. The sex ratio was 1000.
