= Thiruthiyamalai =

Thiruthiyamalai Thirudesamalai
- Interactive map of Thiruthiyamalai
- Country: India
- District: Tiruchirappalli
- Taluk: Musiri
- State: Tamil Nadu
- Time zone: IST

Thirudesamalai or Thiruthiyamalai, is a village in Tiruchirappalli District in the Indian state of Tamil Nadu.

== Geography ==
The village is situated between the Kaveri River to the south and the Kolli Hills to the north.

- Musiri - 15 km northwest
- Thuraiyur - 19 km
- Mannachanallur - 15 km
- Peramangalam - 10 km
- Moovanur - 3 km
- Thandalai Puthur (T.Puthur) - 5 km
- Thiruchirapalli - 49 km
- Chennai (formerly known as Madras) - 300 km northeast

== Culture ==
Thirudesamalai is the site of the 5,000-year-old Hindu Eka Pushpa Priya Nathar Swamy Temple, which is dedicated to the god Shiva.

== Governance ==
Thirudesamalai is governed by a Panchayat along with the villages of Rayapatti, Palappatti, T.Mettupatti, Manali Ayithampatti, T. Ayyambalaiyam, Kollappatti, and Pachanampatti (Melur and Keelur) making up the voting body of Gram Sabha.

== Health care ==
- Government Hospital, Moovanur - 3 km
- Government Hospital, T.Puthur - 5 km
- Government Hospital, Trichy - 48 km

== Education ==
=== Schools ===
- Government High School, Thiruthiyamalai
- Government Higher Secondary School, T.Puthur
- Government Higher Secondary School, Moovanur

=== Colleges ===
- Arignar Anna Government Arts College, Musiri
- Musiri Institute of technology, Musiri
- Government Polytechnic College, Trichy
- Sheshasayi Institute of Technology, Trichy
- Sri Angalamman Engineering College, Trichy
- Sri Jayaram College of Engineering, Karattam Patti
- Sudharsana Polytechnic College, Thuraiyur

== Transport ==
=== Bus ===
Government buses connect to Trichy, Musiri, Peramangalam, Thuraiyur, Pulivalam, Sirugambur, T.Puthur, and beyond. The nearest bus stands are Trichy, Musiri, and Thuraiyur.

=== Train ===
The nearest railway station is Tiruchirappalli Junction (TPJ). No railroads reach from Trichy to Thiruthiyamalai.

=== Air ===
The nearest airport is Tiruchirapalli International Airport (TRZ), located 48 km from Thiruthiyamalai.
