= Alundur =

Coordinates: 10°41′N 78°37′E

- village
- Interactive map of Alundur
- Country: India
- State: Tamil Nadu
- District: Tiruchirappalli

Population (2001)
  - Total: 3,234

Languages
  - Official: Tamil
- Time zone: UTC+5:30 (IST)

Alundur is a village in Srirangam taluk of Tiruchirappalli district in Tamil Nadu, India.

== Demographics ==
As per the 2001 census, Alundur had a population of 3,234 with 1,596 males and 1,638 females. The sex ratio was 1026 and the literacy rate, 51.4.

== Education ==
- J.R.Polytechnic College
