= Kilamullakudy =

Keelamullaikudi
- village
- Country: India
- State: Tamil Nadu
- District: Tiruchirappalli

Government
  - Type: Panchayati raj (India)
  - Body: Gram panchayat

Population (2001)
  - Total: 1,829

Languages
  - Official: Tamil
- Time zone: UTC+5:30 (IST)

Kilamullakudy is a village in Tiruchirappalli taluk of Tiruchirappalli district in Tamil Nadu, India.

== Demographics ==
As per the 2001 census, Kilamullakudy had a population of 1,829 with 920 males and 909 females. The sex ratio was 988 and the literacy rate, 82.41.
