= Perungudi, Tiruchirappalli =

Perungudi, Tiruchirapalli
- village
- Location in Tamil Nadu, India
- Coordinates: 10.823648°N 78.63739°E
- Country: India
- State: Tamil Nadu
- District: Tiruchirappalli
- Elevation: 77 m (253 ft)

Languages
  - Official: Tamil
- Time zone: UTC+5:30 (IST)

Perungudi is a village in Andanallur Taluk in the Tiruchirappalli District of the Indian state of Tamil Nadu. A part of Malliyampathu Panchayath, it is located 7 kilometers west of district headquarters and 9 kilometers from Andanallur.

== Language ==
The local language of the town is Tamil.

== Transport ==
Tiruchirappalli Fort Railway Station, and Tiruchirappalli Railway Station are nearby.

== Education ==
- Cauvery College Of Engineering And Technology
- Kamatchi Polytechnic College

== Schools near Perungudi ==
- Bharathy High School
- S.S.M.S, Arumbugal Nagar
- St. Gabriels M.s
- GHS, Thiruchendurai

== Temple ==
2 km from Somarasampettai is a temple connected with the Kumara Vayalur Murugan temple that is a monument of Sundara Chola and Adithya II periods.

Balasubramaniar is presented with a face and four hands along with Devayani in standing posture. Idols have been discovered in various places inside the temple. At one location Saneeswaran faces Murugan. In another the Shiva statue named Agastheeswarar is tilted, allegedly because Lord Shiva, while accepting a gift from a handicapped woman (as a token of love), had to bend sideways to receive it. The temple was dated to 969 A.D. In another spot the Vishnu statue is just outside Shiva Sannidi.
