= Mudikandam =

- village
- Country: India
- State: Tamil Nadu
- District: Tiruchirappalli

Population (2001)
  - Total: 898

Languages
  - Official: Tamil
- Time zone: UTC+5:30 (IST)

Mudikandam is a village in the Srirangam taluk of Tiruchirappalli district in Tamil Nadu, India.

== Demographics ==
As per the 2001 census, Mudikandam had a population of 898 with 437 males and 461 females. The sex ratio was 1,055 and the literacy rate, 45.18.
