= Arasangudy =

- village
- Interactive map of Arasangudy
- Country: India
- State: Tamil Nadu
- District: Tiruchirappalli

Population (2001)
  - Total: 1,206

Languages
  - Official: Tamil
- Time zone: UTC+5:30 (IST)

Arasangudy is a village in Tiruchirappalli taluk of Tiruchirappalli district, Tamil Nadu.

== Demographics ==
As per the 2001 census, Arasangudy had a population of 1206 with 611 males and 595 females. The sex ratio was 974 and the literacy rate, 76.8.
