= Kulumani =

Neighbourhood in Tiruchirappalli district, Tamil Nadu, India

- village
- Location in Tamil Nadu, India Kulumani (India)
- Coordinates: 10°51′N 78°36′E
- Country: India
- State: Tamil Nadu
- District: Tiruchirappalli

Population (2001)
  - Total: 4,586

Languages
  - Official: Tamil
- Time zone: UTC+5:30 (IST)

Kulumani is a village in the Srirangam taluk of Tiruchirappalli district in Tamil Nadu, India.

== Demographics ==
As per the 2001 census, Kulumani had a population of 4,586 with 2,282 males and 2,304 females.
