= Podavur =

Coordinates: 12°16′N 75°14′E

Pothavoor
- village
- Interactive map of Pothavoor
- Country: India
- State: Tamil Nadu
- District: Tiruchirappalli

Population (2001)
  - Total: 2,594

Languages
  - Official: Tamil
- Time zone: UTC+5:30 (IST)

Bodhavoor is a village in the Srirangam taluk of Tiruchirappalli district in Tamil Nadu, India.

== Demographics ==
As per the 2001 census, Podavur had a population of 2,594 with 1,301 males and 1,293 females. The sex ratio was 994 and the literacy rate, 61.79.
