= Olaiyur, Tiruchirappalli district =

Olaiyur
- village
- Interactive map of Olaiyur
- Coordinates: 10.715402°N 78.683837°E
- Country: India
- State: Tamil Nadu
- District: Tiruchirappalli

Population (2001)
  - Total: 1,064

Languages
  - Official: Tamil
- Time zone: UTC+5:30 (IST)
- Postal code: 620021

Olaiyur is a village in the Srirangam taluk of Tiruchirappalli district in Tamil Nadu, India.

== Demographics ==
As per the 2001 census, Olaiyur had a population of 1,064 with 521 males and 543 females. The sex ratio was 1042 and the literacy rate, 58.17.
