= Mullikarumbur =

Mullikarambur
- village
- Country: India
- State: Tamil Nadu
- District: Tiruchirappalli

Population (2001)
  - Total: 1,442

Languages
  - Official: Tamil
- Time zone: UTC+5:30 (IST)

Mullikarambur is a village in the Srirangam taluk of Tiruchirappalli district in Tamil Nadu, India. It is located about 15 kilometres (9.3 mi) from the district capital of Tiruchirappalli. As per the 2001 census, Mullikarambur had a population of 1,442 with 704 males and 734 females. The sex ratio was 1,048 and the literacy rate, 71.59.
