= Palancavery =

Palancavery, an important pilgrim place, is situated in Pettavaithalai, India. The important temples are Karumbai Amman Temple "Gord Shiva" temple at Devasthanam.The Palancavery is laid on the down streets side of river Cauvery.
