= Elur Pudupatti =

Coordinates: 11.37562°N 78.098561°E

Elur Pudupatti is a settlement in the Namakkal district in Tamil Nadu. Elur Pudupatti's PIN code is 637018. The region's economy is mostly made up of finance, agriculture, and cloth weaving.

== Points of interest ==
- Union Primary School
- Lakkapuram Agricultutural Coopertive Society
- Post office
