= Pukkathurai =

Village in the Indian state of Tamil Nadu

Coordinates: 12.62092°N 79.92119°E

Pukkathurai, or Bukkathurai, is a village located in the Indian state of Tamil Nadu. It is located 12 km borth from Tiruchirapalli District headquarters, 9 km from Manachanellur, and 347 km from Chennai.
