= Purathakudi =

Purathakudi is a village in the Indian state of Tamil Nadu and Tiruchirappalli district. Purathakudi is situated 18 kilometers away from Tiruchirappalli.

Main occupation of the people of Purathakudi is agriculture. There is a famous school, St. Xavier's Higher Secondary School. It has a 325-year-old St. Xavier church and Purathakudi AG Church which is about 40 years old, near the Mahilambadi, Neikkuppai and Pudur Uthamanur villages. Dharmanathapuram is just 4 km from Purathakudi.

It has a post office with PIN code as 621111.
