= Nagamangalam, Krishnagiri district =

Coordinates: 12.566227°N 77.939937°E

Nagamangalam, Krishnagiri district Nagamangalam
- village
- Interactive map of Nagamangalam, Krishnagiri district

Population (2011)
  - Total: 4,948

Nagamangalam is a village in Denkanikottai taluk, Krishnagiri district, Tamil Nadu, India. As of the 2011 Census of India, Nagamangalam had a total population of 4,948 with 2,502 males and 2,446 females.
