= Manjakkorai =

Village in Tiruchirapalli district, Tamil Nadu, India

Coordinates: 10°54′18″N 78°33′36″E

Manjakkorai is a village located near Gunaseelam in Tiruchirapalli district, Tamil Nadu state, India.
