= Agaram, Tiruchirappalli district =

Agaram
- Neighborhood
- Interactive map of Agaram
- Coordinates: 10.7985789°N 78.7479632°E
- Country: India
- State: Tamil Nadu
- District: Tiruchirappalli

Population (2001)
  - Total: 706

Languages
  - Official: Tamil
- Time zone: UTC+5:30 (IST)

Agaram is a neighbourhood of the city of Tiruchirappalli in Tamil Nadu, India. It is situated in the heart of the city.

== Demographics ==
As per the 2001 census, Agaram had a population of 706 with 342 males and 364 females. The sex ratio was 1064 and the literacy rate, 85.81.
