= Andanallur =

Coordinates: 10°52′N 78°36′E

- village
- Interactive map of Andanallur
- Country: India
- State: Tamil Nadu
- District: Tiruchirappalli

Population (2001)
  - Total: 4,540

Languages
  - Official: Tamil
- Time zone: UTC+5:30 (IST)

Andanallur is a village in the Srirangam taluk of Tiruchirappalli district in Tamil Nadu, India.

== Demographics ==
As per the 2001 census, Andanallur had a population of 4,540 with 2,230 males and 2,310 females. The sex ratio was 1.036.
