= Manpidimangalam =

Village in Tamil Nadu, India

Manpidimangalam is a village in Trichy district which inherits its name from the epic "Ramayana". It located from 10 km northwest towards Trichy in Tamil Nadu. The major occupation of the people who belong to this village are cultivating plantains and paddy. Most of the area is covered with fields. The name of this village derives its name from "Ramayana". There is a myth among people that this was the place where Lord Rama catches the magical deer.
