= Sengattuppatti =

Sengattupatti
- panchayat village
- Location in Tamil Nadu, India Sengattupatti (India)
- Coordinates: 11°11′58″N 78°38′46″E
- Country: India
- State: Tamil Nadu
- District: Tiruchirappalli
- Taluk: Thuraiyur
- Founder: Thuraiyur municipality

Government
  - Type: Logal government of Tamil nadu
- Elevation: 194 m (636 ft)

Population (2011)
  - Total: 5,994

Languages
  - Official: Tamil
- Time zone: UTC+5:30 (IST)

Sengattupatti is a gram panchayat in Thuraiyur taluk, Tiruchirappalli district, in the Indian state of Tamil Nadu.
