= Mutharasanallur =

Neighbourhood in Tiruchirappalli district, Tamil Nadu, India

- Village
- Mutharasanallur, Tiruchirapalli, Tamil Nadu, India Mutharasanallur (India)
- Coordinates: 10°51′54.7″N 78°38′57.1″E
- Country: India
- State: Tamil Nadu
- District: Tiruchirapalli
- Elevation: 121 m (397 ft)

Population (2001)
  - Total: 10,000 approx

Languages
  - Official: Tamil
- Time zone: UTC+5:30 (IST)
- PIN: 620101
- Telephone code: 91431xxxxxxx
- Vehicle registration: TN-48
- Website: mnallur.blogspot.com

Muttharasanallur is a neighborhood of Tiruchirapalli in the state of Tamil Nadu, India. It is located approximately 7 km to the west of Trichy City on the road to the town of Karur. Mutharasanallur is a main agricultural village with water source from the River Kaveri.

== Culture ==
The people of Muttharasanallur live in joint-families, like many South Indian villages. The main source of finance is agriculture. Many locals also spend their time at local temples, and participate in traditional events and celebrations.

== Economy ==
The village is mostly (90%) agricultural land. The major source of income is agriculture comes from cultivating rice, cucumber, bananas, sugarcane, blackgram and sesame.

== Temples ==
- Sri Siddhi Vinayak temple
- Sri Madurakali Amman temple (200+ years)
- Sri Shakti Mariyamman temple (150+ years)
- Shiva Temple (300+ years old)
- Sri Lakshmi Narayan Temple (300+ years old)
- Adaikalam Kaatha Amman
- Shri Maha Maariyamman temple (Kaikudi) (200+ years)

== Transport ==
Well connected government buses, mini buses from Trichy. Chatram Bus Stand, and railway facilities are available connecting the Trichy Junction and Trichy Fort.

== Government Facilities ==
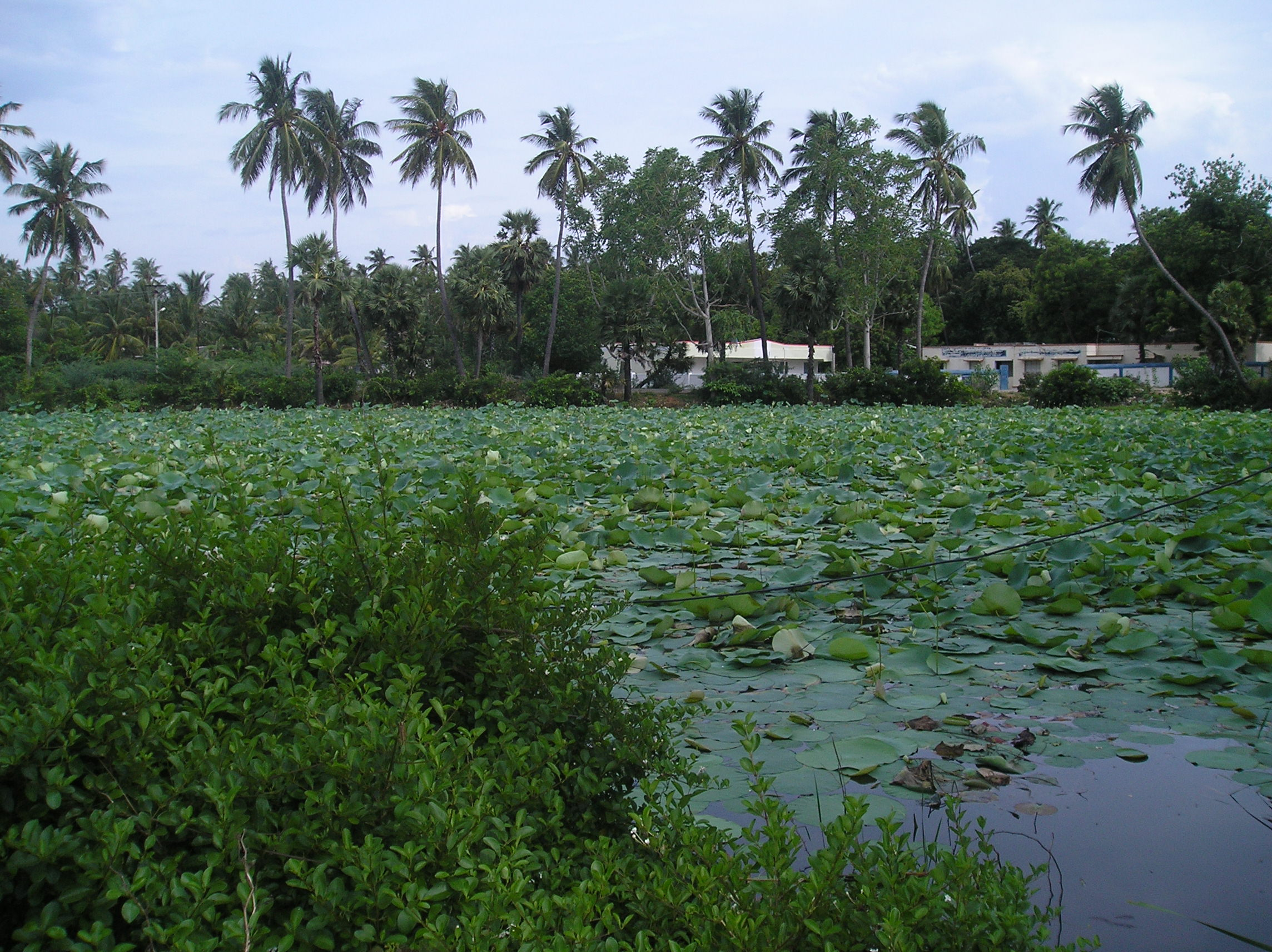
Mutharasanallur

- Mutharasanallur Railway Station
- Post Office
- Telephone Exchange
- High School
- Veterinary Hospital
- Bank

== Administration ==
This village is a Village Panchayat under Andanallur Union. The village belongs to Srirangam Taluk of Tiruchirapalli district and the below areas are under Mutharasanallur Panchayat administration.

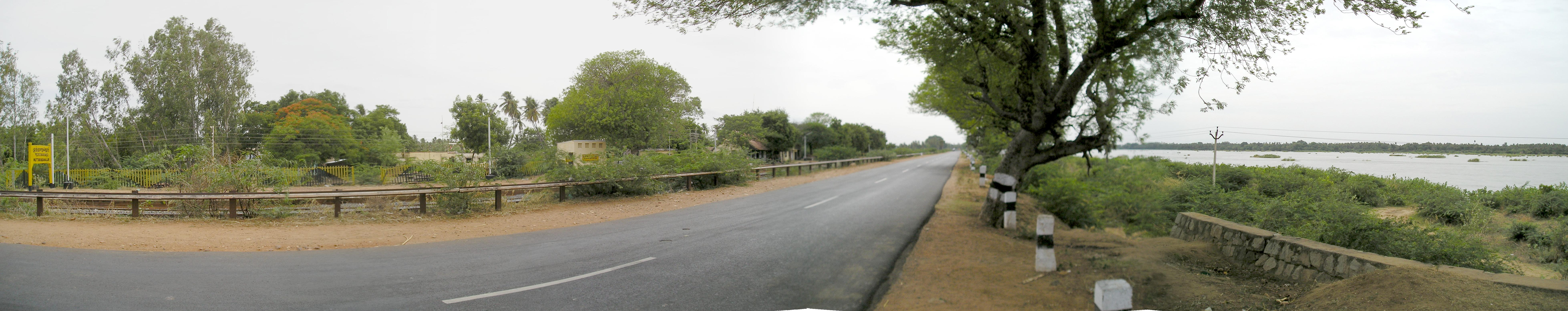
Panoramic view of Mutharasanallur from Bus-stop (Trichy-Karur Main Road)

List of streets (alphabetical order):

- Agraharam
- Amman Nagar
- Anna Nagar
- Cauvery Nagar
- Devanga Nagar
- Green Park Nagar
- Gudalur
- Kaikudi
- Kamaraja Puram
- Kavalkara Street
- Mandapa Thoppu
- Murungapettai
- Muthamizhl Puram
- Ramnagar
- Sekkillar Kudil
- Sri Ganapathi Nagar
- Vasanth Nagar
- Vellalar Street
- Tamilzhan Nagar

=== President ===
T. ஆதிசிவன்

=== Ex-Presidents ===
- Lalitha Kamaraj B.com - (Since 2006- 2016)
- N. Kamaraj B.com-(Since 1996-2006)
- S.Rajasekar B.A ( 1984 - 1989 )
- K.Ganesan 1964
