= Kilakurichy =

- village
- Country: India
- State: Tamil Nadu
- District: Tiruchirappalli

Population (2001)
  - Total: 6,536

Languages
  - Official: Tamil
- Time zone: UTC+5:30 (IST)

Kilakurichy is a neighbourhood of the city of Tiruchirappalli in Tamil Nadu, India. It is situated in the heart of the city.

== Demographics ==
As per the 2001 census, Kilakurichy had a population of 6,536 with 3,232 males and 3,304 females. The sex ratio was 1022 and the literacy rate, 88.42.
