= Iluppaiyur, Virudhunagar district =

Village in Tamil Nadu, India

Coordinates: 9°28′15.6″N 78°16′01.2″E

Iluppaiyur or Illupaiyur is an agricultural panchayat village in the Virudhunagar district of Tamil Nadu, India. It is one of several settlements in Tamil Nadu named for the Iluppai tree.

== Geography ==
The seasonal Gundaru River flows to the east of Iluppaiyar. Iluppaiyar Road passes through the village, connecting it to Velanoorani and Kattanpatti to the southeast and to Pillaiyar Natham to the northwest.

== Demographics ==
The village is predominantly inhabited by members of the Nadar and Chettiar communities. At the 2011 census of India, the population was 627, with 168 households, of whom 456 (247 males and 209 females) were literate.

== Religion and festivals ==
Sri Kaliamman Temple, Velanoorani is in Illupaiyar. The village holds a five-day Panguni Pongal festival every April.

== Education ==
NKV Sala (Nadar Kshathriya Vidhya Sala) primary school is in Iluppaiyur.
