= Azad Road =

- village
- Location in Tamil Nadu, India Azad Road (India)
- Coordinates: 10.56°N 78.33°E
- Country: India
- State: Tamil Nadu
- District: Tiruchirappalli
- Elevation: 179 m (587 ft)

Languages
  - Official: Tamil
- Time zone: UTC+5:30 (IST)
- Telephone code: +91 4332
- Vehicle registration: TN 45
- Sex ratio: 949 ♂/♀

Azad Road is a traditional village in Trichirapalli District in the Indian state of Tamil Nadu. Situated 54 km southwest of Trichy and 51 km northeast of Dindigul on National Highway 45, it is near the geographic centre of the state.

== Etymology ==
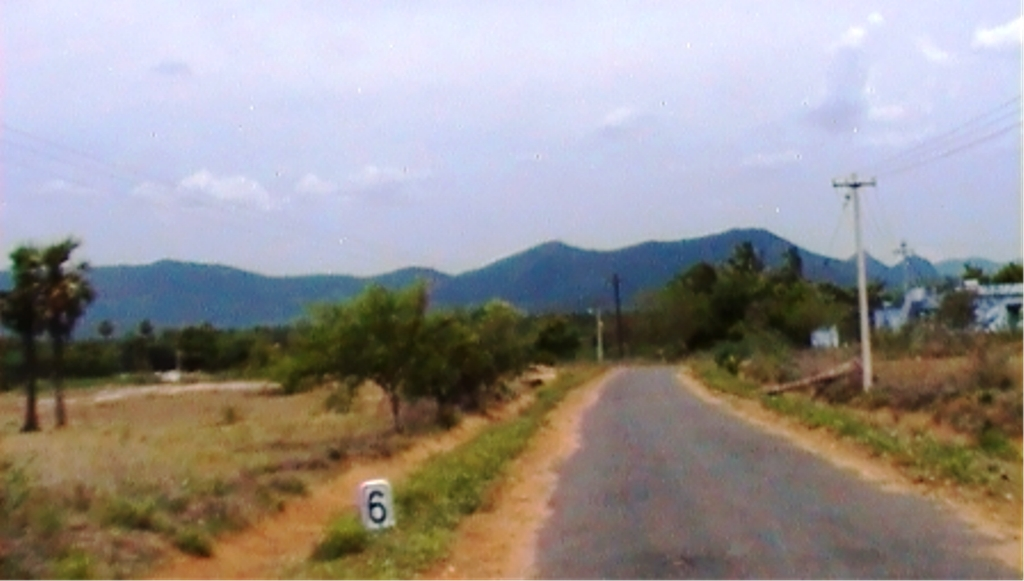
Azad road to Elangakurichy way

Azad Road to Elangakurichy Road was first laid by N.S.M.Pichai Mohamed Rowther of Elangakurichy who was a business tycoon and a member of congress, and named in memory of Moulana Abul Kalam Azad (first education minister of independent India); the road was inaugurated in 1955 by former chief minister of Tamil N. Kamaraj.

== History ==
During the end of the 20th century, some villagers from neighbourhood they settled here permanently.

== Geography ==
Azad Road is located at Coordinates: 10°33'57"N 78°19'52"E. It has an average elevation of 173 metres (568 ft).

== Climate ==
The climate of Azad Road is tropical in nature with little variation in summer and winter temperatures. While April–June is the hottest summer period with the temperature rising up to the 38 °C mark, November–February is the coolest winter period with temperature hovering around 18 °C, making the climate quite pleasant. The village gets all its rains from the North-east Monsoons between October and December.

== Culture ==
Azad Road has multi-generational patriarchal joint families, although nuclear families are becoming common in the 21st century. An overwhelming of villagers have their marriages arranged by their parents and other respected family members, with the consent of the bride and groom. Marriage is thought to be for life, and the divorce rate is extremely very low. Child marriage is not followed in Azad Road.

Popular styles of dress include draped garments such as sari, thavani for women and vesti, lungi for men; in addition, stitched clothes such as chudidar for women and European-style trousers and shirts for men, are also popular.

=== Cuisine ===
The staple foods in the village are rice and rice product. Early morning after getting from sleep, they will drink dairy product like fresh milk (or) tea. They will take breakfast like, Idly, Dosai, appam, uthappam, Idiyappam, paniyaram, puri etc. For Lunch normally rice with any anam and poriyal (boiled vegetable with chilly powder) will be there. Anam means masal or mixture of eatable product with water. Different type of anam are kari anam (chicken or mutton masal), mean anam (fish masal), vendaika anam, pavaka anam, kaikari anam (veg masal), maamdi anam (mutton masal with extra pepper), manja thanni (mutton with turmeric), pulisaru, sambar, rasam, Vatha Kulambu, etc. For dinner normally villagers cook extra food in lunch, if any shortage in eating they will cook dosai instant food.

== Economy ==
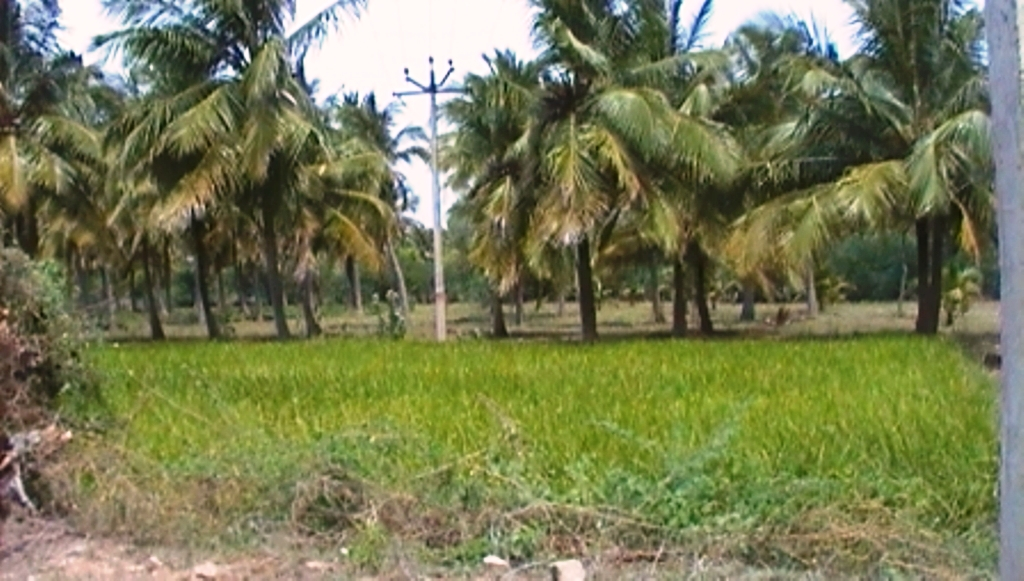
Azad road Agri Field

The village produces coconuts, groundnuts, mango, paddy rice, tomato and other vegetables. A lot of farms are irrigated from wells, as well as rain water irrigation. Rain water irrigation is used for the groundnut fields.

== Places of Worship ==
Within one kilometer, lot of temples and Churches available but most famous and ancient Hindu Temple is located opp to Bus Stop. Masjid is located within 2–3 km from Village.

== Education ==
- Sahaya Annai N&P
- Government primary school

== Transport ==
The village is well connected to other parts of Trichy and Tamil Nadu through National Highway 45 and by the railway network. This NH-45 connects Trichy and Dindigul. Transport is provided by the State owned Tamil Nadu State Transport Corporation (TNSTC), and private bus transport, directly connects total Tamil Nadu.
