= Edangimangalam Vellanur =

Village in Southern India

Coordinates: 10.919186°N 78.865217°E

Edangimangalam Vellanur is a village in the Trichirapalli district of Tamil Nadu in southern India. It is 27 kilometers away from Trichirapalli. It located on the way from Trichirapalli to Chidambaram on Highway NH227.
