= Palur, Tiruchirappalli district =

Palur
- City of Tiruchirappalli
- Location in Tamil Nadu, India
- Coordinates: 10°51′50″N 78°38′28″E
- Country: India
- State: Tamil Nadu
- District: Tiruchirappalli
- Taluk: Srirangam

Population (2001)
  - Total: 1,406

Languages
  - Official: Tamil
- Time zone: UTC+5:30 (IST)

Palur is a part of the city of Tiruchirappalli and located in the Srirangam taluk of Tiruchirappalli district in Tamil Nadu, India.

== Demographics ==
As per the 2001 census, Palur had a population of 1,406 with 695 males and 711 females. The sex ratio was 1023 and the literacy rate, 78.57.
