= Nagamangalam, Sivaganga district =

Nagamangalam, Sivaganga district Nagamangalam
- village
- Country: India
- State: Tamil Nadu
- District: Sivaganga
- Taluk: Devakottai

Population (2011)
  - Total: 172
- Vehicle registration: TN-

Nagamangalam is a village in Devakottai taluk, Sivaganga district, Tamil Nadu, India. As of the 2011 census, Nagamangalam had a total population of 172 with 79 males and 93 females.
