= Somarasampettai =

Coordinates: 10.8125°N 78.6342°E

- Tiruchirappalli metro
- Interactive map of Somarasampettai
- Country: India
- State: Tamil Nadu
- District: Tiruchirappalli

Population (2011)
  - Total: 8,774

Languages
  - Official: Tamil
- Time zone: UTC+5:30 (IST)

Somarasampettai is a part of the city of Tiruchirappalli and located in the Srirangam taluk of Tiruchirappalli district in Tamil Nadu, India.

== Demographics ==
As per the 2011 census, Somarasampettai had a population of 8,774 with 4,352 males and 4,422 females. According to 2001 census the sex ratio was 1029 and the literacy rate, 85.26.
