= Maruvathur =

Village in Tamil Nadu thuraiyur disrict

Coordinates: 10°56′N 79°36′E

- village
- Interactive map of Maruvathur
- Country: India
- State: Tamil Nadu
- District: Tiruchirappalli

Population
  - Total: 5,456

Languages
  - Official: Tamil
- Time zone: UTC+5:30 (IST)

Maruvathur is a village in Tiruchirappalli district, Thuraiyur block in the Indian state of Tamil Nadu.

== Location ==
Maruvathur is located near the foothills of Pachaimalai eastern mountain range of Tamil Nadu. Maruvathur, a clean ecological village, is located 9 km north of Thuraiyur. This village is surrounded by Venkadathanur, Sengaatupatti, Kirambur, Sellipalayam, Renganathapuram and Krishnapuram. Maruwathur is the site of many temples such as Palamalayan temple, Palayathal temple, Poonatchi Temple, Kamatchi temple, Perumal temple, Murugan temple and Mariamman temple. The Panjamuga Anjeneyar temple situated in Lord Perumal temple is famous for its architecture. You can see few statues like this in the world.

== Demographics ==
Maruvathur has 60% educated people. This village has a facility for higher education. The major economy of this village is dependent upon agriculture. The major food crops are rice, sugar cane, onions, banana, coconut trees and Lemon Trees. This village is surrounded by Pachamalai. So climate is cool throughout the year. This village has good internal architecture such as cement roads, water facilities, electricity facilities, telephone facilities, mobile towers, post office, Internet availability and transportation. On 31 August 2014, reconstructed Shri Kamatchi Amman Koil " Kumabhishekam" was celebrated for three days and families now live in off places from Delhi visited. It was a grand occasion and recently reconstructed on 21 February 2016 Shri Chinnappillai Amman koil and Periyasamy, Santhana Karuppu koil "Kumbabhishekam" was celebrated for two days. it's one of the powerful gods in the village. The "Punarutharnam" of Shri Poonatchi Amman Koil was celebrated on 10 July 2016 with much fanfare.

The total population of this village is 10,000. Some 50% of the people are farmers, 25% are self-employed, 25 are professionals who are working in nearby towns and cities.

Buses are available between Thuraiyur and Sellipalayam every 10 minutes from 5:00 am to 10:00 pm. There is growing wish to clean and upgrade the Lake near Arulmigu Palayathamman Temple.The Varaiaru river water from Pachamalai Hills should be utilised properly to fill the lake. Vinodhrathnaa lives in New Delhi belongs to this village.
