= Panaiyapuram =

- village
- Country: India
- State: Tamil Nadu
- District: Tiruchirappalli

Population (2001)
  - Total: 1,235

Languages
  - Official: Tamil
- Time zone: UTC+5:30 (IST)

Panaiyapuram is a village in the Srirangam taluk of Tiruchirappalli district in Tamil Nadu, India.

== Demographics ==
As per the 2001 census, Panaiyapuram had a population of 1,235 with 614 males and 621 females. The sex ratio was 1011 and the literacy rate, 70.93.
