= Tiruchendurai =

- village
- Country: India
- State: Tamil Nadu
- District: Tiruchirappalli

Population (2001)
  - Total: 2,469

Languages
  - Official: Tamil
- Time zone: UTC+5:30 (IST)

Tiruchendurai is a Neighborhood of Trichirappalli in the Srirangam taluk of Tiruchirappalli district in Tamil Nadu, India.

== Demographics ==
As per the 2001 census, Tiruchendurai had a population of 2,469 with 1,212 males and 1,257 females. The sex ratio was 1037 and the literacy rate, 83.36.

== Contacts ==
Post Office: Mutharasanallur
Pincode: 620101
Telephone code: 0431

controversy Tamil Nadu Waqf Board claims ownership of entire Thiruchendurai village.A controversy erupted after a communication sent to a Sub-Registrar in Tiruchi recently claimed that an entire piece of land measuring about 480 acre in Thiruchendurai village belonged to the Tamil Nadu Waqf Board and those wanting to register a deed for any land in the village must obtain a No-Objection certificate from it, The Hindu reported, quoting sources.
