= Kiliyur =

- village
- Country: India
- State: Tamil Nadu
- District: Tiruchirappalli

Government
  - Type: Panchayati raj (India)
  - Body: Gram panchayat

Population (2011)
  - Total: 5,000

Languages
  - Official: Tamil
- Time zone: UTC+5:30 (IST)
- Postal code: 606102

Kiliyur is a village in Thiruverambur taluka of Tiruchirappalli district in Tamil Nadu, India.

== Demographics ==
As per the 2001 census, Kiliyur had a population of 674 with 331 males and 343 females. The sex ratio was 1036 and the literacy rate, 85.14.
