= Valavandankottai =

Coordinates: 10°46′N 78°50′E

- Neighborhood
- Interactive map of Valavandankottai
- Country: India
- State: Tamil Nadu
- District: Tiruchirappalli

Population (2001)
  - Total: 6,969

Languages
  - Official: Tamil
- Time zone: UTC+5:30 (IST)

Valavandankottai is a neighbourhood of the city of Tiruchirappalli in Tamil Nadu, India. It is situated in the outskirts of the city near NIT Trichy in Thuvakudi.

== Demographics ==
As per the 2001 census, Valavandankottai had a population of 6,969 with 3,519 males and 3,450 females. The sex ratio was 980 and the literacy rate, 83.99.
