= Palaganangudy =

- city
- Location in Tamil Nadu, India Palaganangudy (India)
- Coordinates: 10°43′28″N 78°48′39″E
- Country: India
- State: Tamil Nadu
- District: Tiruchirappalli

Population (2001)
  - Total: 8,880

Languages
  - Official: Tamil
- Time zone: UTC+5:30 (IST)

Palaganangudy is a panchayat town in Tiruchirappalli district in the Indian state of Tamil Nadu.

== Demographics ==
As of 2001 India census, Palaganangudy had a population of 8880. Males constitute 50% of the population and females 50%. Palaganangudy has an average literacy rate of 74%, higher than the national average of 59.5%: male literacy is 79%, and female literacy is 68%. In Palaganangudy, 13% of the population is under 6 years of age.
