= Allur, Tiruchirappalli district =

Allur
- village
- Country: India
- State: Tamil Nadu
- District: Tiruchirappalli

Government
  - Type: Panchayati raj (India)
  - Body: Gram panchayat
  - Panchayat President: ruthrakumar

Population (2017)
  - Total: 6,080

Languages
  - Official: Tamil
- Time zone: UTC+5:30 (IST)

Allur is a village in Srirangam taluk of Tiruchirappalli district in Tamil Nadu, India. The village is famous for the Panchanadeeshwarar Temple.

== Demographics ==
As per the 2001 census, Allur had a population of 3,148 with 1,563 males and 1,585 females. The sex ratio was 1014 and the literacy rate, 82.82.
