= Velampatti =

Velampatti is a village in the Tiruchirappalli district of the State of Tamil Nadu, India.

Velampatti is 25 km from Namakkal the Thuraiur road, close to Pavithuram Village. The main business of Velampatti is agriculture. It is next to Killi Kills.

Jallikatti takes place in Velampatti every January. The village also celebrates the Pongal Festival.
