= Kannanurpalayam =

Kannanurpalayam ( கண்ணனுர் ), also known as Kannanur or simply K.Palayam, is a small village in Thuraiyur, Tiruchirapalli District, Tamil Nadu, India. The 2022 estimated populated is between 6,976 and 7,972 people. It is known for the place of worship that is located in the village.

== Location ==
Kannanurpalayam is situated on the banks of the Ayyaru or Alyaru River. The Ayyaru starts in the Kolli hills. Kannanurpalayam is surrounded by Kannanur, Velayadhum Palayam, Thevarappam Patti, and Ponnusangam Patti.

The timesone is IST (UTC+5:30).

== Economy ==
The main industry of Kannanur is agriculture, primarily of paddy, coconut, pepper cashew, tapioca, areca nut, and rubber. The Aliyar (also referred to as the Aiyaru) River aids in the irrigation of the farmland.

== Demographics ==
The current population estimate of 6,976 - 7,972 people is determined from the 2011 census which found 7,118 lived in the town at the time. Of the 7,118 people, 3,526 (49.5%) were male and 3,592 (50.5%) were female. Most of the population of Kannanur was found to be literate with a rate of 70.8%

== Education ==
Kannanur Palayam has an education ratio of 70%. The Government School in Kannanurpalayam offers education up to 8th standard.

== Colleges ==
Imayam College of Arts & Science, Kannanur.

Jayaram College of Engineering, Thuraiyur.

== Culture ==
Festivals are celebrated frequently throughout the year. In January they celebrate Pongal, in March they celebrate Kaman Festival, and in April or May, they celebrate Mariyamman Thiruvila.

The language spoken is Tamil.
