= Dharmanathapuram =

Coordinates: 10°54′N 78°47′E

- Interactive map of Dharmanathapuram
- Country: India
- State, Region: Tamil Nadu, Chola Nadu
- District: Tiruchirapalli
- Division: Lalgudi division
- Taluk: Lalgudi taluk
- State Assembly Constituency: Lalgudi (1952 onwards)
- Lok Sabha Constituency: Perambalur since 2009

Government
  - Type: Village
  - Body: village panchayat
- Elevation: 57 m (187 ft)

Languages
  - Official: Tamil
- Time zone: UTC+5:30 (IST)
- Postal code: 621111
- Telephone code: 0431
- Vehicle registration: TN-48

Dharmanathapuram is a village near Lalgudi in Tiruchirapalli district in the Indian state of Tamil Nadu. It heads the revenue village of Neikuppai south. The village of Dharmanathapuram is surrounded by fertile wet lands. The village had a population of 200 in 2001.

== History ==
Dharmanathapuram was established during early British India by the then landlord Savarimuthu udayar and his son in law Y. Savarimuthu Udayar. Today the people live in Dharmanathapuram are their great grands and their maternal great grands. They all belong to the community Parkavakulam.

== Church ==
St. Paul of Thebes Church, Dharmanathapuram (புனித வனத்து சின்னப்பர் ஆலயம்) is the Roman Catholic church in this evergreen village of Dharmanathapuram. The old church was built during the 19th century and its roof is made of tile, it had a tower of about 30 ft height from ground level. Due to the building becoming weak and old it was demolished during 1983. The first stone was laid in 1983 for the construction of the new church. After completion in 1987, the church was blessed and opened by Paul Arulsamy the then Bishop of kumbakonam.

== Transport ==
Dharmanathapuram lies in the district highway from Lalgudi Santhapettai to Dharmanathapuram. It is 8 km away from lalgudi, 4 km away from Purathakudi and 10 km from Samayapuram.

=== Air transport ===
The nearest airport is Tiruchirappalli International Airport just 25 km from Dharmanathapuram.

=== Railway ===
The nearest railway stations are mandurai, valadi and lalgudi railway station.
