= Pangayarselvi =

- village
- Country: India
- State: Tamil Nadu
- District: Tiruchirapalli

Languages
  - Official: Tamil
- Time zone: UTC+5:30 (IST)
- Vehicle registration: TN-
- Coastline: 0 kilometres (0 mi)

Pangayarselvi is a village in Tiruchirapalli district, Tamil Nadu.
