= Peramangalam =

Peramangalam Veera Rama Mangalam
- village
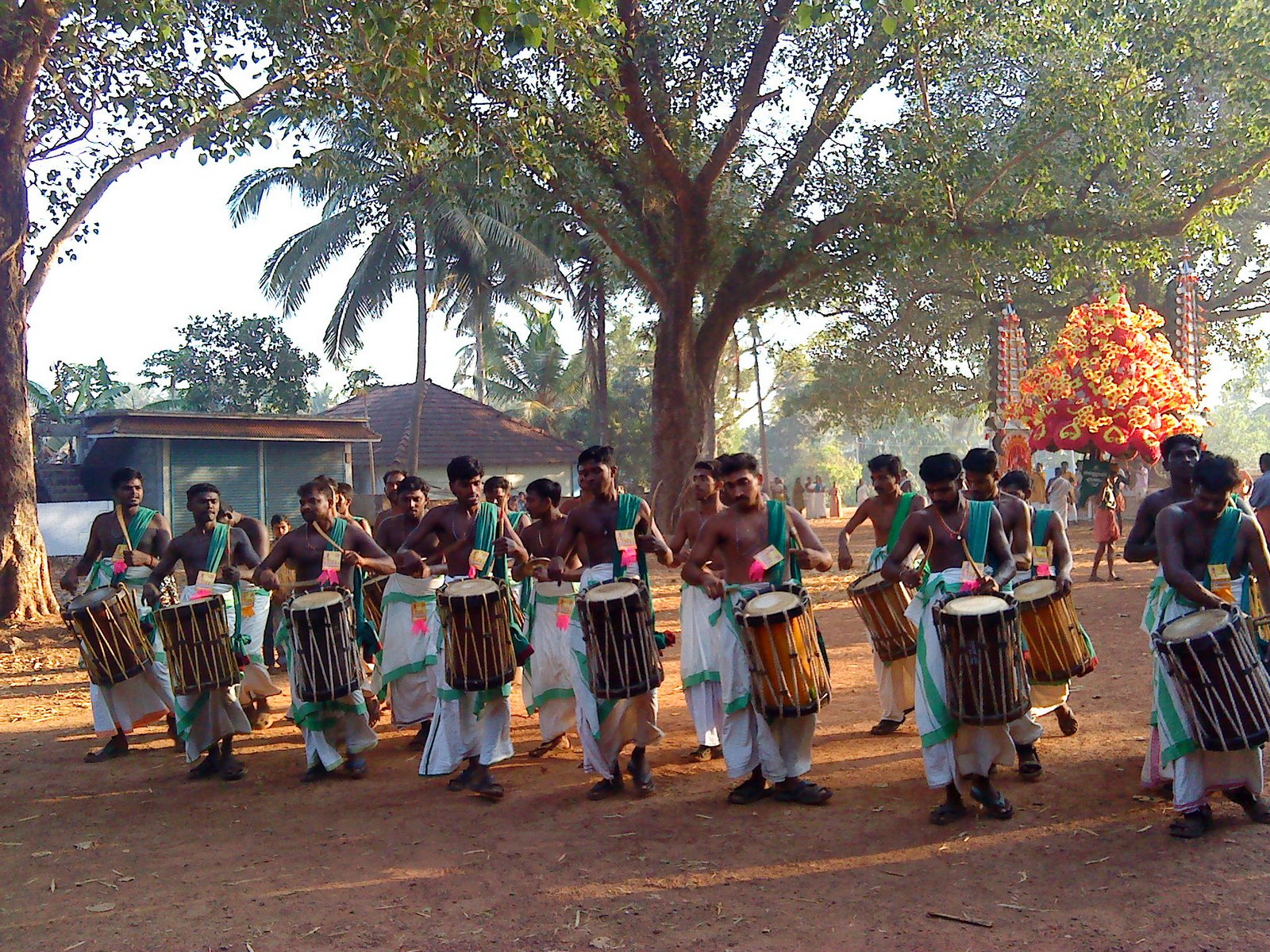
- Choorakkottukavu Bhagavathy Temple
- Interactive map of Peramangalam
- Coordinates: 10.57485°N 76.16232°E
- Country: India
- State: Kerala
- District: Thrissur

Government
  - Body: Kaipparambu Panchayat

Area
  - Total: 5 km^{2} (1.9 sq mi)

Languages
  - Official: Malayalam, English
- Time zone: UTC+5:30 (IST)
- PIN: 680545
- Telephone code: Mundoor, Amalanagar
- Vehicle registration: KL-
- Coastline: 0 kilometres (0 mi)
- Nearest city: Thrissur
- Lok Sabha constituency: Alathur
- Civic agency: Kaipparambu Panchayat
- Climate: Tropical monsoon (Köppen)
- Avg. summer temperature: 35 °C (95 °F)
- Avg. winter temperature: 20 °C (68 °F)

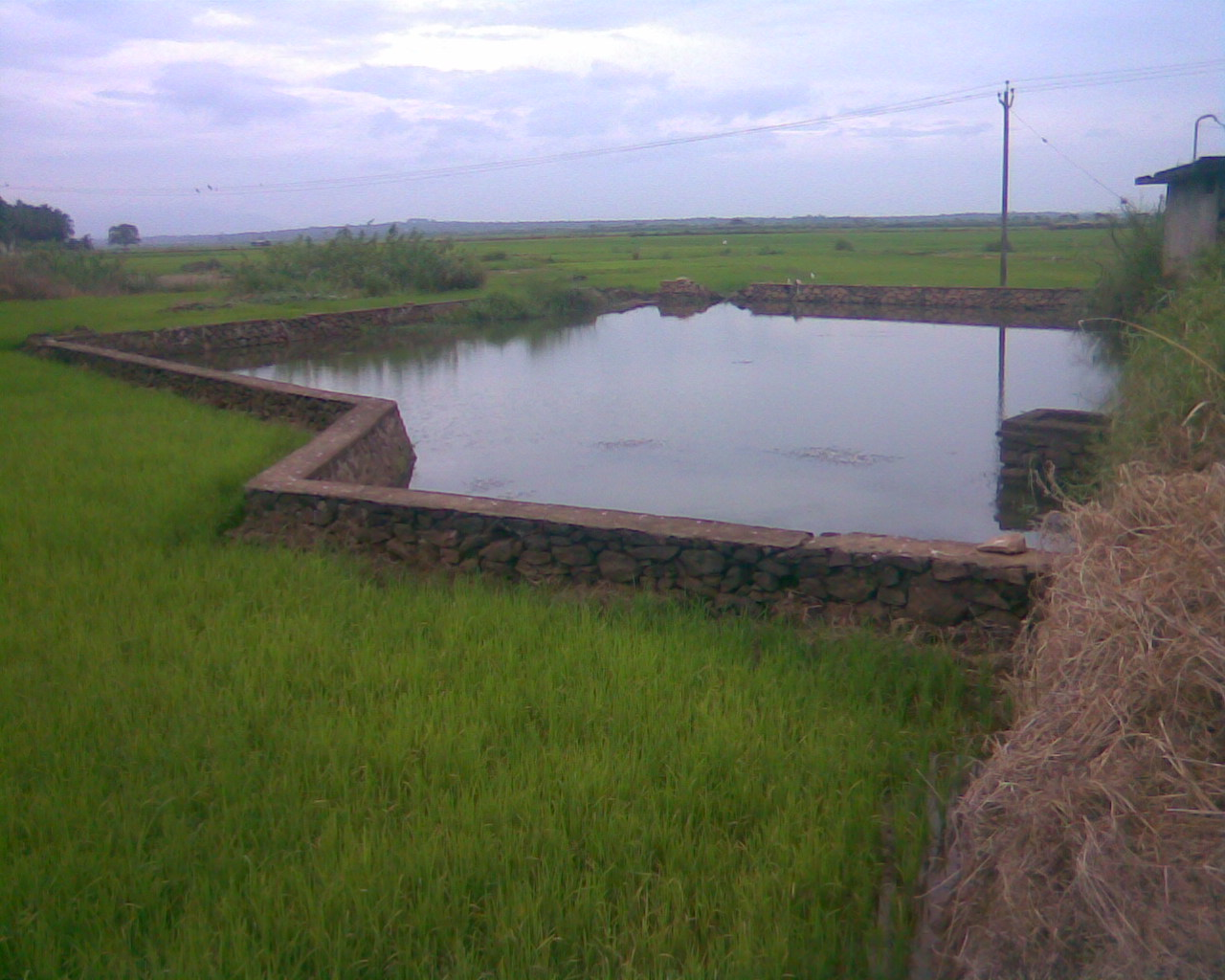
Adatt Panchayath

Peramangalam is an Indian village in the Indian state of Kerala. The village is an example of a culturally rich region in Thrissur.

== Geography ==
It is 9.5 kilometres from Trichur. The district highways connecting Kozhikode and Guruvayoor pass through this village. A large baniyan tree on the side of a big playground. Avanavu Road, Peralthrikkovu Road, Vellitheri angadi Road are the main roads.

The tourist attraction Villangankunnu is on the southwestern side of this village.

== Etymology ==
Peramangalam originates from the name Veeraramamangalam, which originated from Peralthrukovu Sreeramaswami Temple there.

== Governance ==
It is a part of Kaiparambu Grama Panchayat, bordering Adat Grama Panchayat.

== Religion ==
The village hosts multiple faiths:

- Thechikkotukavu Bhagavathy Temple
- Peramangalam St. Mary's Church
- Peralthrukovu Sreerama swami Temple
- Sri Poothrukavu Shiva Temple
- Cheeramkuzhy Murugan Temple

== Economy ==
The village hosts

- Bank Of Baroda

== Education ==
Peramangalam has many schools:

- Sree Durga Vilasom Higher Secondary School
- Thechikootukavu Devasom College
- Vijayamatha College (situated in St. Marys church compound)
- The International School Of Thrissur
- Kendriya Vidyalaya
- PARAMEKKAVU VIDYA MANDIR
- IES Public School

== Amenities ==
- PPF Shuttle Club, Mullaparambu Road
- Star Shuttle Club Amala Arcade
- Jaithra Nidhi Limited
- Angel homes-Avanavu Road
- Peramangalam Arts & Cultural Charitable Society [PACCS]
- Highway police headquarters.

== Notables ==
Notables from Peramangalam include:

- Kerala's tallest elephant Thechikottukavu Ramachandran".
- Communist leader Shri E.P. Marar
- Congress leader Shri M.P. Ayyappan
- Educationlist Kaninghat Sarojini (teacher founder of Chinmaya Mission College)
- Santhosh trophy player K A Lorance, N.K. Pradeep
- POLICE MEDAL FOR MERITORIOUS SERVICE 2013 awardee K A Lorance
- Supreme Court Advocate Subash Chandran
- Panchavadyam expert Eravath Appu Marar
- Kathakali actor Kalamandalam Gopi

== Festivals ==
The main festival is Vela and Pooram of Thechikottukavu temple. The feast related to St. Sebastian is another important spiritual and cultural activity. It is celebrated in the month of January. It is often called Makaram Perunallu [largest holy procession in the district]. Kavadiyatam is another important festival. This one also comes in January. This festival is attached to Cheeran Kuzi Temple.
