= Appananallur =

Village in India

Coordinates: 11°02′N 78°23′E

Appananallur is a village in Thottiyam Taluk in the Tiruchirappalli district of the Tamil Nadu State in India. The village is inhabited by 1482 families, with a population of 5610, with 2792 males and 2818 females per the 2011 Census of India.
