= Kalpalayathanpatti =

Village in Tamil Nadu, India

Coordinates: 10.573°N 78.399°E

Kalpalayathanpatti is a village in Tiruchirappalli district, Tamil Nadu, India. This village has around 5000 people, many of whom work in agriculture and construction works.
