= Elandapatti =

- village
- Country: India
- State: Tamil Nadu
- District: Tiruchirappalli

Population (2001)
  - Total: 646

Languages
  - Official: Tamil
- Time zone: UTC+5:30 (IST)

Elandapatti is a neighbourhood of the city of Tiruchirappalli in Tamil Nadu, India. It was merged with the Tiruchirappalli Corporation

== Demographics ==
As per the 2001 census, Elandapatti had a population of 646 with 314 males and 332 females. The sex ratio was 1057 and the literacy rate, 51.8.
