= Adhanur, Tiruchirappalli district =

Adhanur
- village
- Interactive map of Adhanur
- Coordinates: 11.065745°N 78.580279°E
- Country: India
- State: Tamil Nadu
- District: Tiruchirappalli

Population (2001)
  - Total: 1,904

Languages
  - Official: Tamil
- Time zone: UTC+5:30 (IST)

Adhanur is a village in Thuraiyur taluk of Tiruchirappalli district in Tamil Nadu, India.

== Demographics ==
As per the 2001 census, Adhanur had a population of 1,904 with 971 males and 933 females. The sex ratio was 961 and the literacy rate, 64.16. In this Panchayat called ulloor village fully followed THOTTAMAL samy.
