= Maniyankurichy =

Coordinates: 11.02831°N 78.80030°E

Maniyankurichy is a village in the Trichy district of Tamil Nadu, India. The village is located 38 km north of Trichy. There are several engineering colleges and one medical college nearby. Agriculture is the main occupation in Maniyankurichi village. Nearby places are Siruganur, Padalur etc. Maniyankurichi is nearer to Perambalur district. Brahmapuriswarar temple is situated nearby.
