= Sooriyur =

- neighborhood of Tiruchirappalli
- Location in Tamil Nadu, India
- Coordinates: 10°40′30.72″N 78°45′32.4″E
- Country: India
- State: Tamil Nadu
- District: Tiruchirappalli

Government
  - Panchayat President: S.SHANMUGASUNDARAM

Population (2001)
  - Total: 2,400

Languages
  - Official: Tamil
- Time zone: UTC+5:30 (IST)
- Postal code: 620025
- Telephone code: 0431

Sooriyur is a neighbourhood of the city of Tiruchirappalli in Tamil Nadu, India. It is situated in the heart of the city.

== Demographics ==
As per the 2001 census, Sooriyur had a population of 2,400 with 1,188 males and 1,212 females. The sex ratio was 1020 and the literacy rate, 57.32.

== Educational Institutions ==
Anna University Tiruchirappalli and IIM Trichy are present in Sooriyur, Tiruchirappalli-Pudukkottai National Highway 336
