= Tirunedunkulam =

- Neighborhood
- Country: India
- State: Tamil Nadu
- District: Tiruchirappalli

Population (2001)
  - Total: 1,464

Languages
  - Official: Tamil
- Time zone: UTC+5:30 (IST)

Tirunedunkulam is a neighbourhood of the city of Tiruchirappalli in Tamil Nadu, India. It is situated in the heart of the city.

== Demographics ==
As per the 2001 census, Tirunedunkulam had a population of 1,464 with 732 males and 732 females. The sex ratio was 1000 and the literacy rate, 82.02.
