= Thiruthalaiyur =

Coordinates: 11.0372933°N 78.5454999°E

Thiruthalaiyur is a village panchayat located in the Tiruchirappalli district of Tamil Nadu state, India. Malaikuravan community reside in the village.
