= Nambukurichi =

Village in Tamil Nadu, India

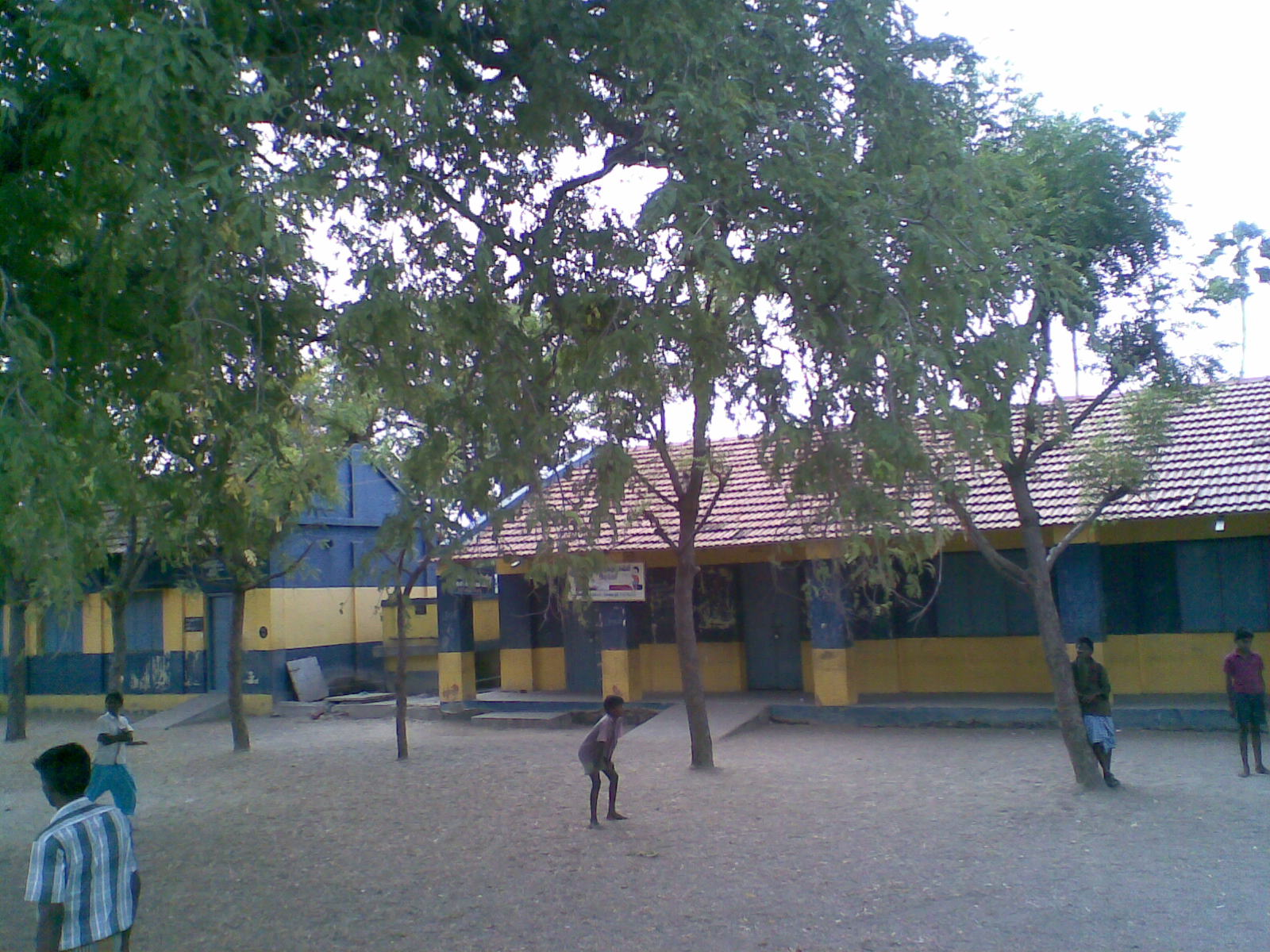
Panchayat Union Elementary school

Nambukurichi is a village near to padalur located in the Lalgudi zone of the city of Tiruchirappalli in the Indian state of Tamil Nadu. The village population is around 1,050 (2016 data).

== Schools around Nambukurichi ==
Nambukurichi has one primary school, Panchayat Union Elementary School. Approximately 60 students are studying there. This school started 60 years ago.

1. Panchayat Elementary School Nambukurichi

2. Govt HSS Peruvalappur (5Km)

3. Govt High School Oottathur(3Km)

4. Govt HSS Sirugalappur (4Km)

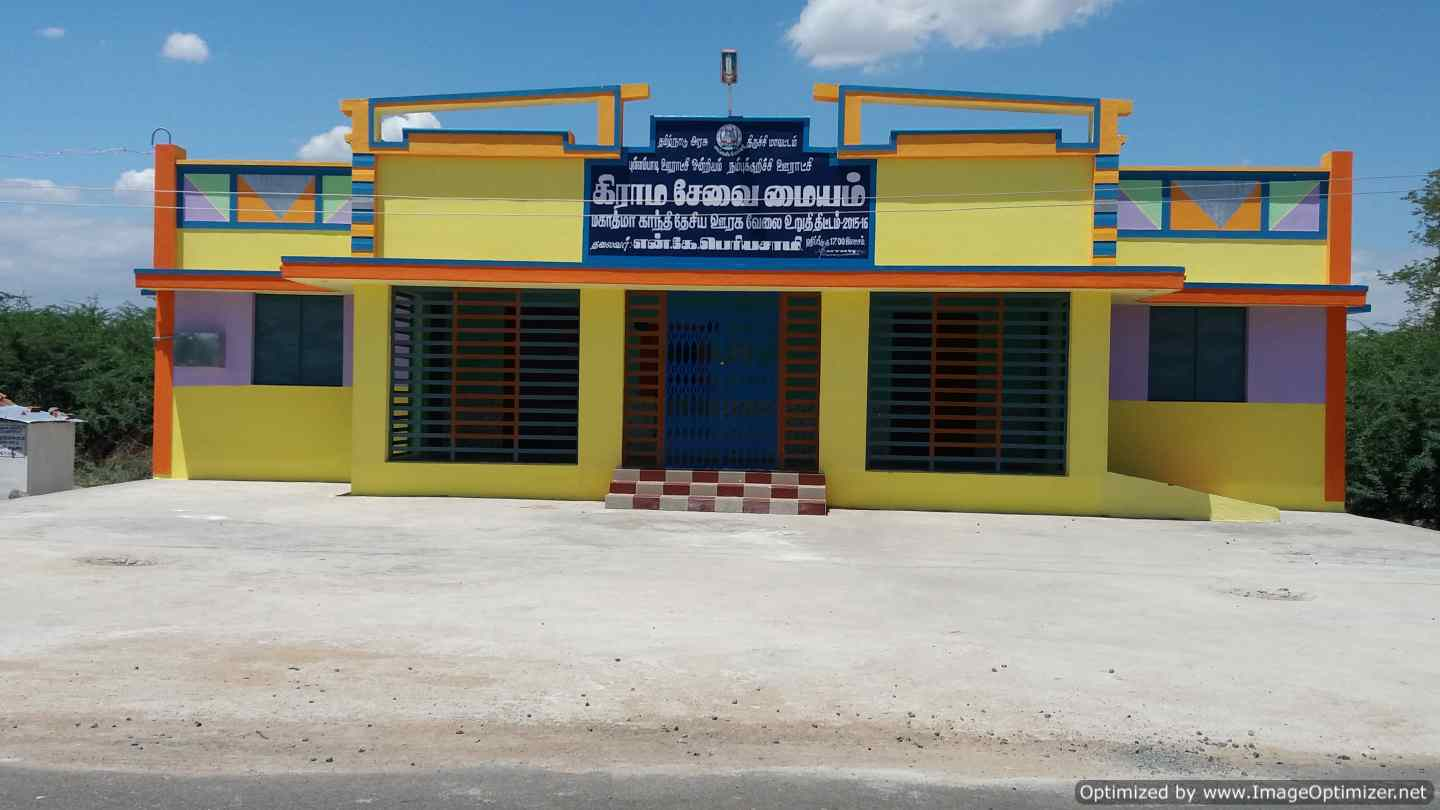
Village Seva Building

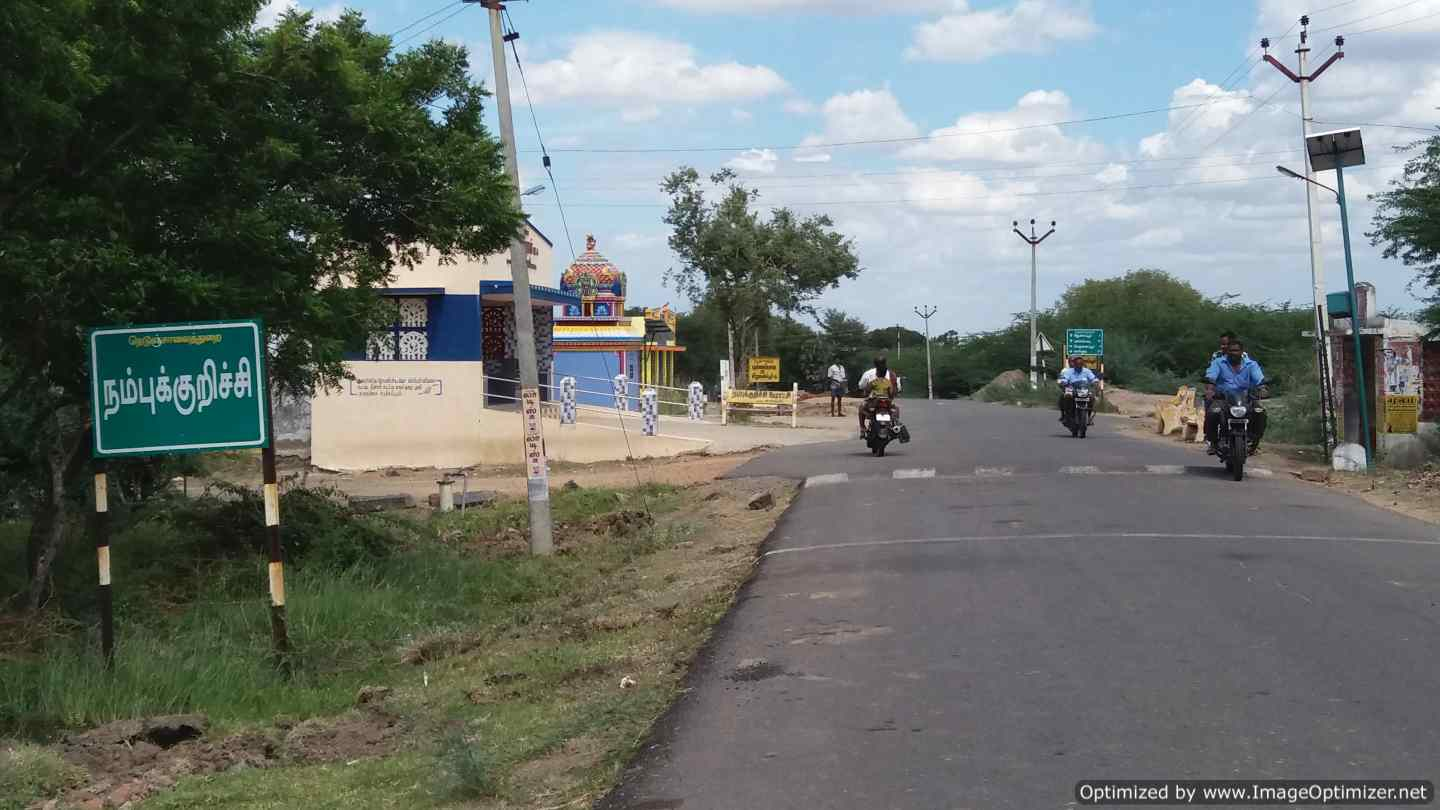
Village Entrance

5. Govt HSS Padalur (8Km)

== Colleges and Technical Institution around Nambukurichi ==
There are many institutions within a 30 km radius, including the National Institute of Technology, Tiruchirappalli, the Indian Institute of Management Tiruchirappalli, K.A.P. Viswanatham Government Medical College

== Demography ==
As per the 2011 Census, Nambukurichi had a total population of 952 peoples and schedule castes are the majority of people. They occupy 70% of the total village population. The village doesn’t have any Schedule Tribe (ST) population.

	Total	Schedule Caste	Schedule Tribes	Others	Child
Total	952	664	0	268	89
Male	475	342	0	133	45
Female	477	322	0	135	44

The total geographical area of the village is 1491.1 hectares (nearly 3685 acres). There are about 350 houses in Nambukurichi village.

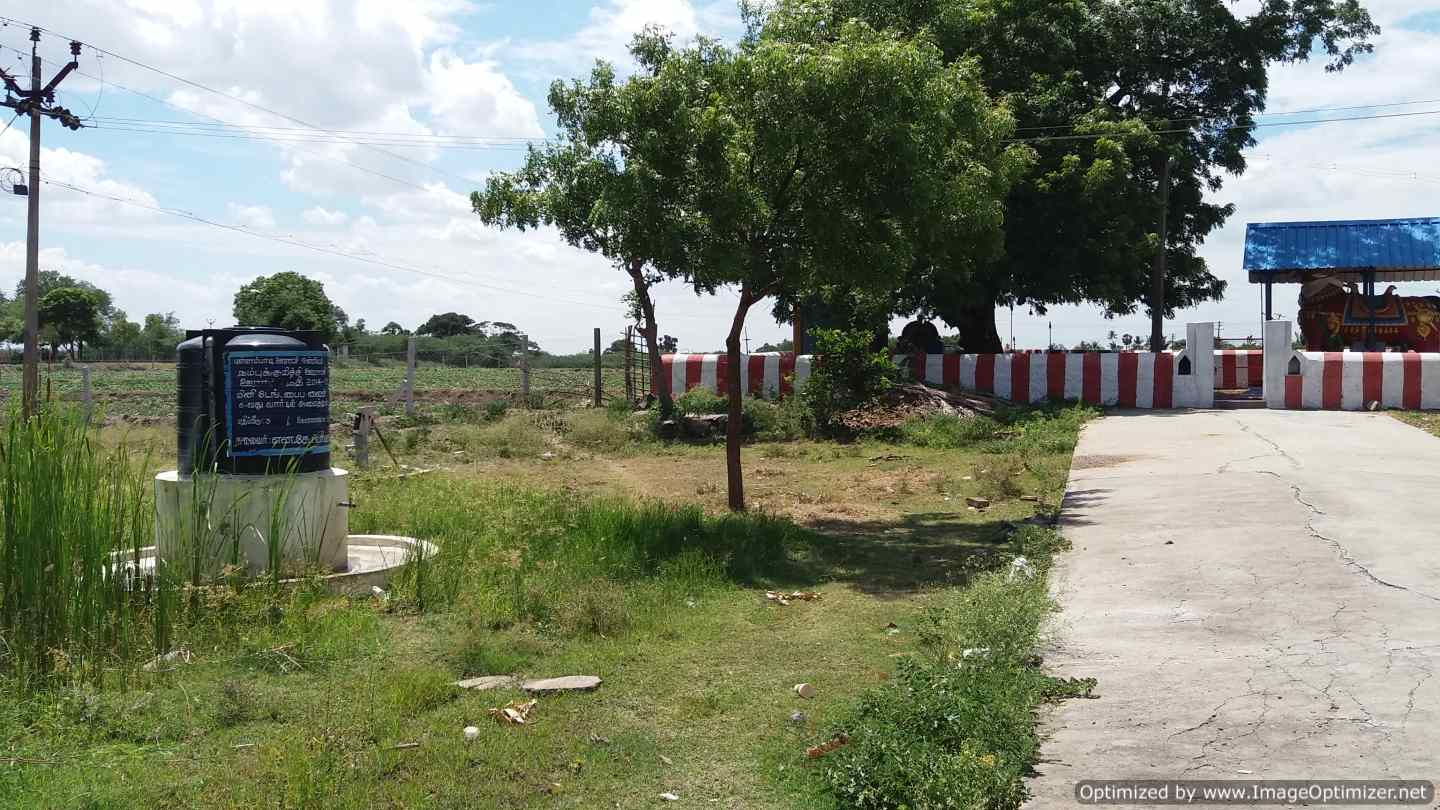
Muthusamy Koil

== Transport and road connections ==
Two nearby areas, Padalur and Pullambadi, are connected by new extended broad roads. Connecting lines are:

1. Nambukurichi to Peruvalappur
2. Nambukurichi to Padalur
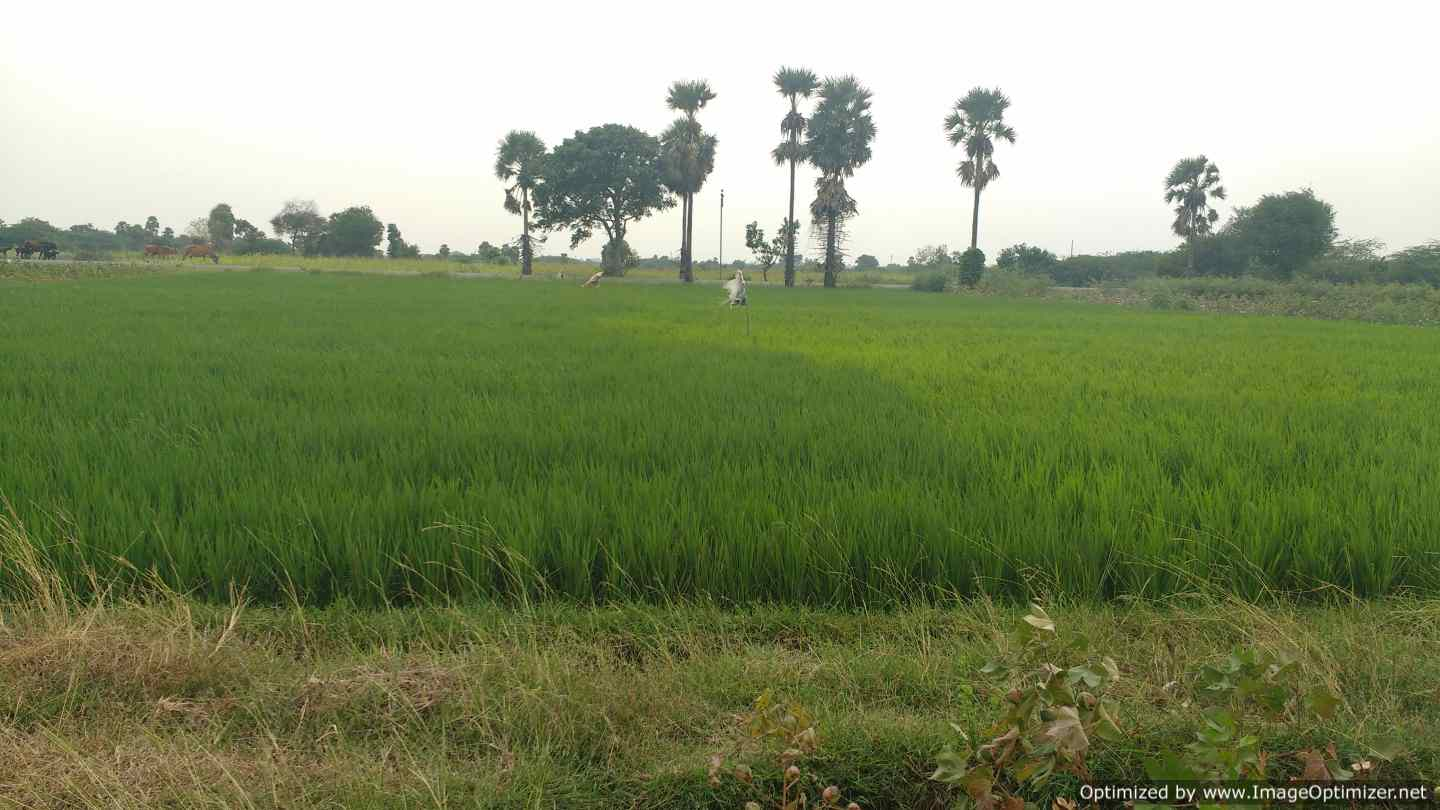
3. paddy field
  Nambukurichi to Oottathur
4. Nambukurichi to Neikulam
5. Nambukurichi to Sirugalappur

== Agriculture ==
Cotton is the main crop here. Farming here is the main occupation. In this village, one big lake named Nakkambadi Lake of 78.96 Hectares. This lake is mainly used for irrigation and fishing. There was no water supply in the last 10 years for irrigation because of improper management. Of 577 workers engaged in Main Work, 49 were cultivators (owner or co-owner) while 437 were Agricultural laborers. Now only kudimaramath works are going in Nakkambadi Lake under Ariyaru Division, PWD Department.

== Workers ==
In Nambukurichi village out of the total population, 577 were engaged in work activities. 97.75 % of workers describe their work as Main Work (Employment or Earning more than 6 Months) while 2.25 % were involved in Marginal activity providing a livelihood for less than 6 months.

== Temples ==
There are 10 temples around this village. Temple names are listed below:

1. Mariyamman Kovil (East)
2. Pillaiyar Kovil (Colony Street)
3. Oorsuthiyan Kovil
4. Nattukkal Kovil
5. Moopana Kovil

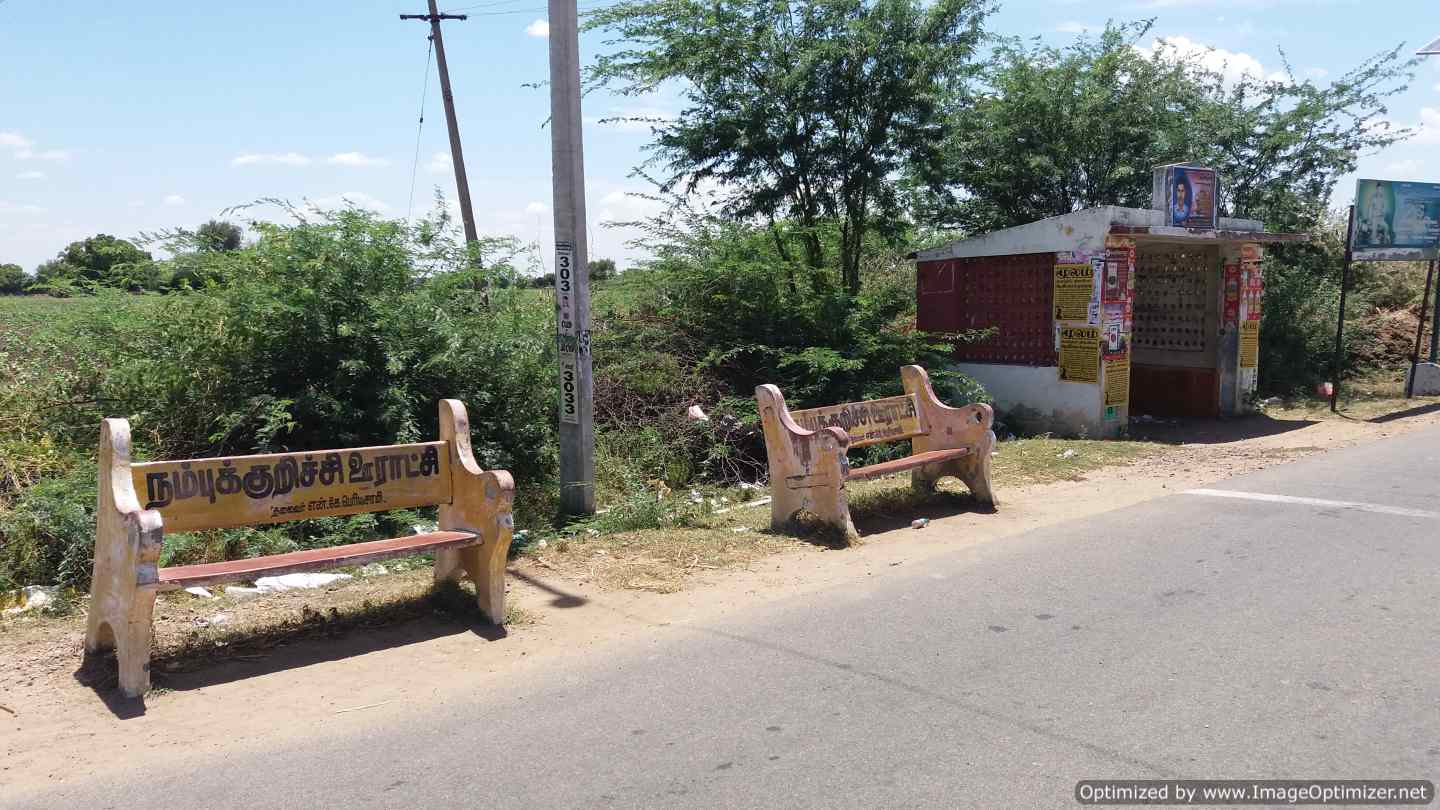
Village Bus Stop Stone Bench

Ilaignar Narpani Mandram: They are conducting Pongal festival games for every year since 1970s.
