= Malvoi =

- village
- Location in Tamil Nadu, India
- Coordinates: 11°02′57″N 78°57′47″E
- Country: India
- State: Tamil Nadu
- District: Tiruchirapalli

Languages
  - Official: Tamil
- Time zone: UTC+5:30 (IST)
- Vehicle registration: TN-
- Coastline: 0 kilometres (0 mi)

Malvoi is a village located in the Tiruchirapalli district of Tamil Nadu, India. It is approximately 40 kilometers from the Tiruchirapalli district headquarters. The closest neighboring villages are Sadurbagam to the northwest, Orathur to the northeast, and Melarasoor to the south.

Malvoi celebrates the traditional Hindu ritual of Kumbhabhishekam. This event, occurring every 25 years, attracts attendees from neighboring villages as well as Chennai, the capital city of Tamil Nadu. The Kumbhabhishekam festival is primarily celebrated at the Arulmigu Boomibalagan Temple, one of two temples in the village. Residents consider this village tradition to be a vital part of their religious identity, culture, and community spirit.

The 2001 Census of India reported that Malvoi had 478 households and a total population of 1,907.
