= Nagamangalam, Tiruchirappalli district =

Nagamangalam
- Neighborhood
- Location in Tamil Nadu, India
- Coordinates: 10°54′28″N 78°42′08″E
- Country: India
- State: Tamil Nadu
- District: Tiruchirappalli
- Division: Lalgudi

Population (2001)
  - Total: 4.332

Languages
  - Official: Tamil
- Time zone: UTC+5:30 (IST)
- Vehicle registration: TN45

Nagamangalam is a Neighborhood of Tiruchirapalli in the Tiruchirappalli district in Tamil Nadu, India. It is located at 14 km from Central Bus stand and equally distant from Tiruchirapalli Railway junction. Nagamangalam is situated in Trichy - Madurai road and is a rapidly developing residential area. Being located next to Panjapur and Manikandam it has ample greenary and pollution free atmosphere.

The nearby residential locality is Dheeran Mahanagar approximately at a distance of 2 k Also, at walkable distance to New Central Vegetables and Fruit market.m.

Nagamangalam was primarily an agricultural area before but has come to lime light due to nearby Trichy infrastructure projects. Trichy integrated bus stand announced in 2021 at Panjapur is at a distance of 8 km from Nagamangalam making it a convenient place for next sought after residential locality. Also, recently Trichy corporation has announced Nagamanglam village to be converted from panchayat to corporation under its Trichy Corporation expansion project.

Two colleges located in Nagamangalam are Don Bosco Animation college and Servite Nursing college. Jayam Garden a gated community residential colony is located in Nagamangalam.

== Demographics ==
As per the 2001 census, Nagamangalam had a population of 4,322 with 2,135 males and 2,187 females. The sex ratio was 1024 and the literacy rate, 64.22.
