= Iluppaiyur, Tiruchirappalli district =

Neighbourhood in Tiruchirappalli district, Tamil Nadu, India

Coordinates: 11.06402°N 78.63387°E

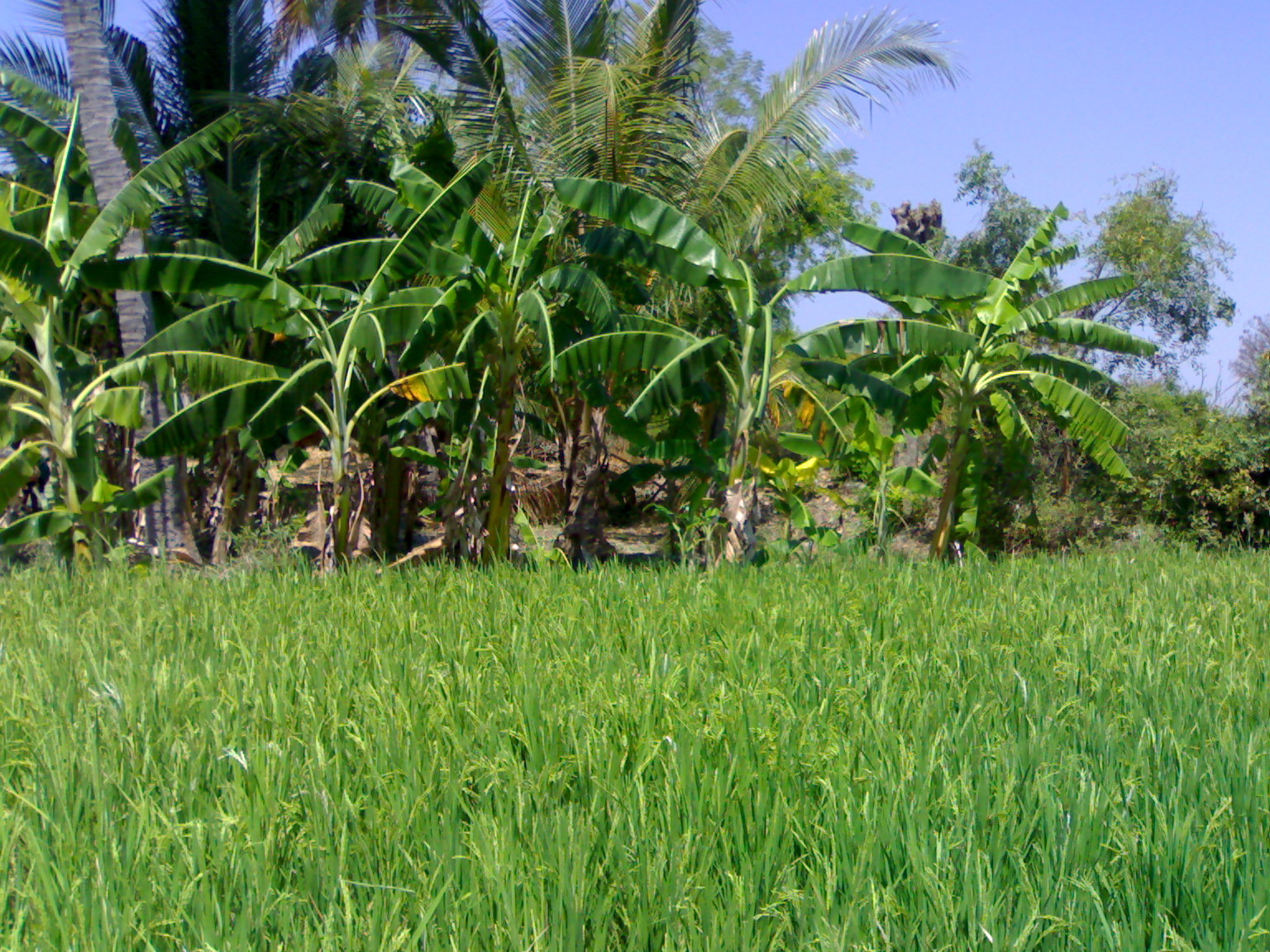
A view of Paddy field in Iluppaiyur

Iluppaiyur or Eluppaiyur is a small village in Sathanur Panchayat in Tiruchirappalli District in Tamil Nadu, India. This village belongs to Thinnanur Post and Musiri Taluk. Most of the people in this village belongs to the Arunattu Vellalar caste. Iluppaiyur village is located 4 km from Karattampatti (From Trichy to Thuraiyur Main Road SH 62) and approximately 30 km distance from Trichy. The main economy is based on agriculture. Main agriculture product is Rice.The major source of irrigation is Wells. The population of Iluppaiyur is around 500. Presently, around 300 voters dwell in this village. Musiri Panchayat Union Elementary School Iluppaiyur is located here with strength around 60.

== Temples and Festivals ==
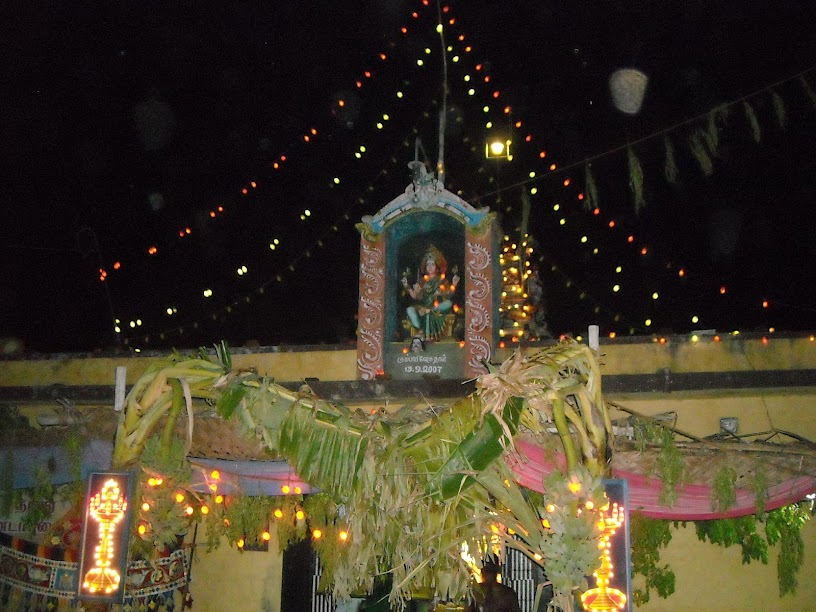
Lord Mariyamman temple decorated during chiththirai festival

Shri Selva Ganapathy temple, Shri Maha Mariyamman temple, Shri Aladi Muthu Karuppannasamy temple and Shri Aiyanar temple are located in this village. Also, Arunattu Vellalar kulathaivam temples include Shri Thottichchi Amman temple and Shri Appur Nallenthiraswamy temple are placed in this village.

Chiththirai festival (Also called Kudiyazhaippu Vizha) is one of the most popular festivals of Iluppaiyur. This festival falls in May every year. Kudiyazhaippu Vizha lasts for five days. Even though many villagers have moved to the cities, they return to celebrate this festival in their native village.

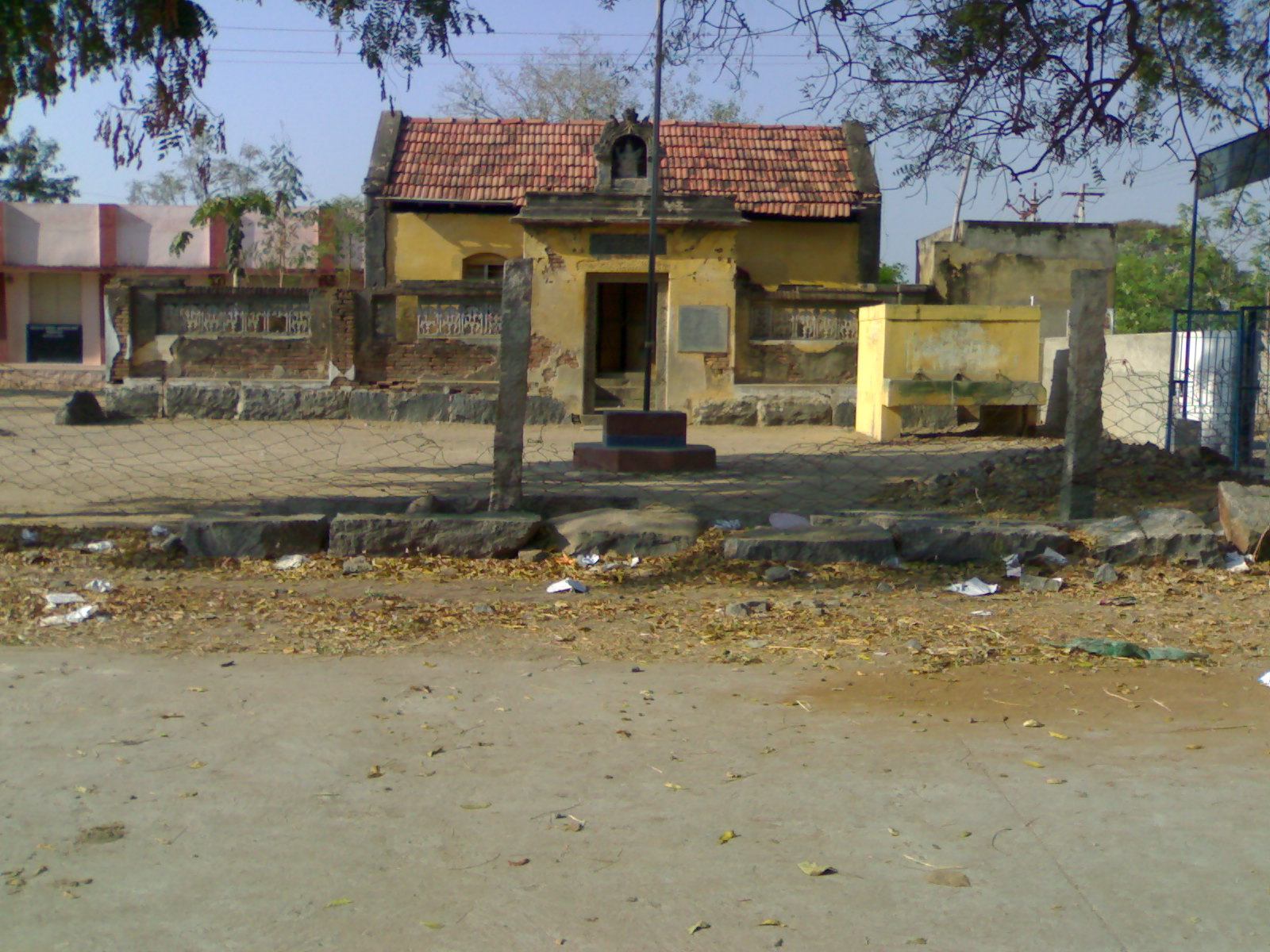
View of Musiri Panchayat Union Elementary School Iluppaiyur old Building

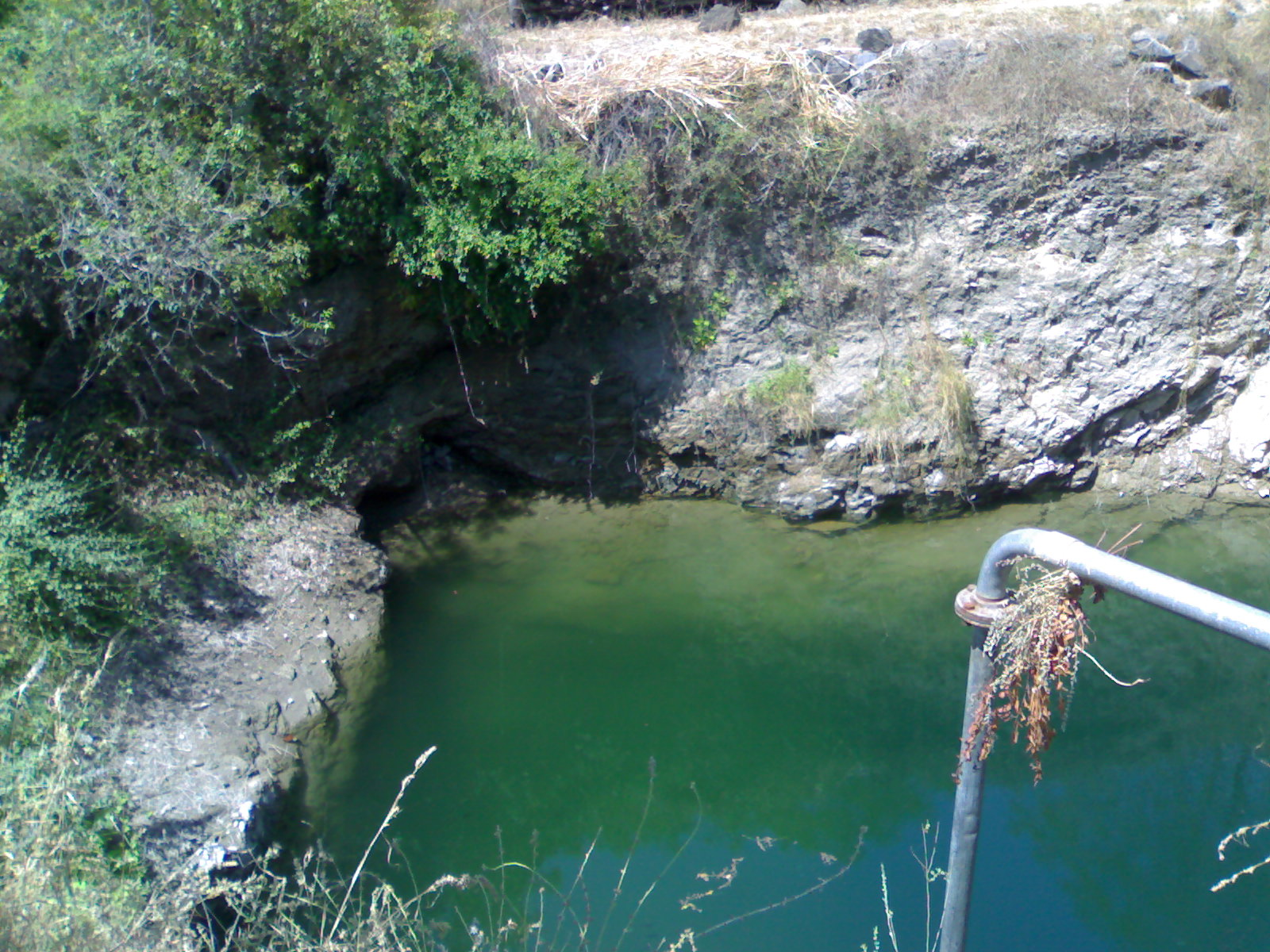
A view of Pump set in well in Iluppaiyur

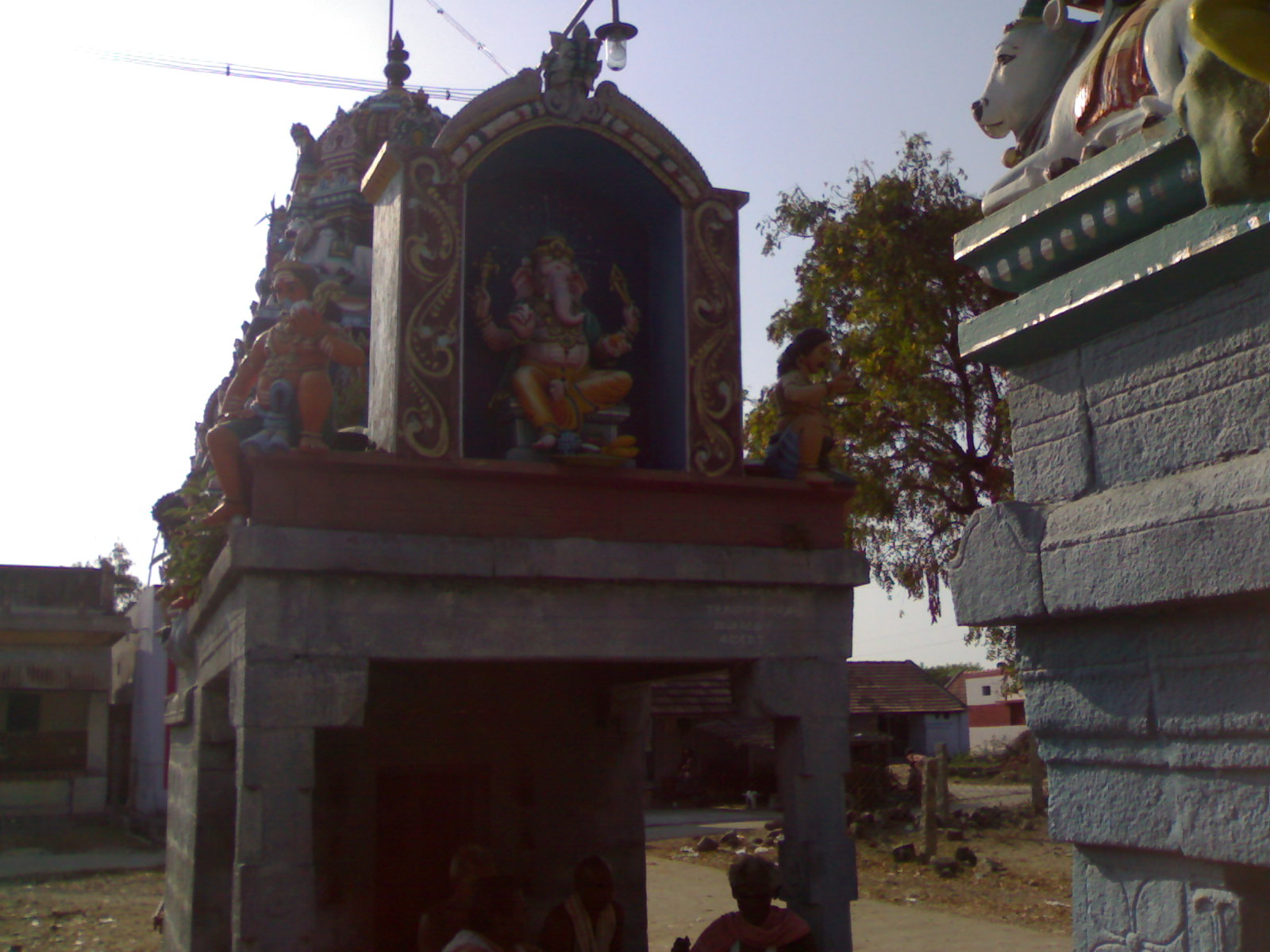
View of Iluppaiyur Vinayagar temple

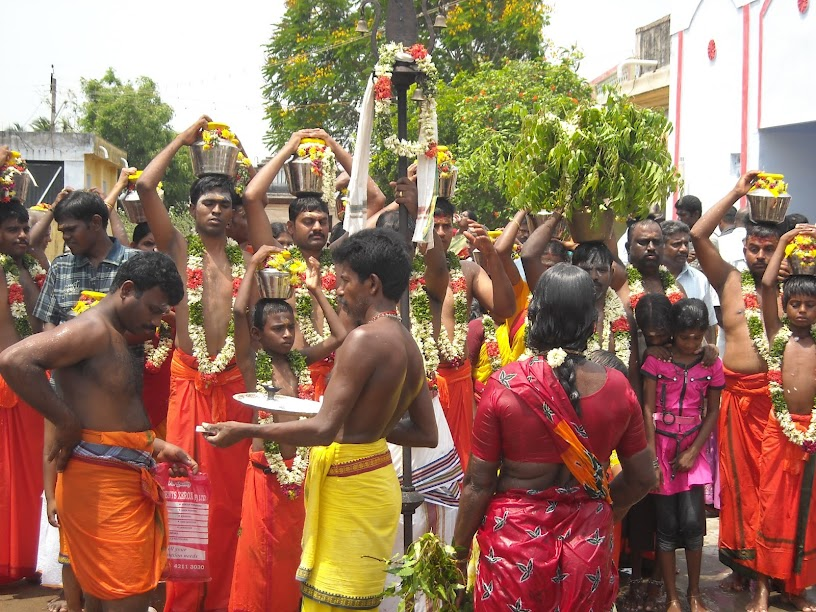
Devotees go around Iluppaiyur Village part of Chiththirai festival
