= Tiruchirappalli West taluk =

Tuluk in Tamil Nadu, India

Tiruchirapalli West Taluk is a taluk of Tiruchirapalli district of the Indian state of Tamil Nadu. It was formed in 2013 when the Tiruchirappalli taluk was bifurcated into Tiruchirappalli East and Tiruchirappalli West. Wards 39 to 42 and 44 to 60 fall under the jurisdiction of the Taluk.

== Demographics ==
According to the 2011 census, the taluk of Tiruchirappalli had an area of 41.63 square kilometres (16.07 sq mi) and had a population of 326,421. It had a literacy rate of 82.77%.
