= Srirangam taluk =

Srirangam taluk is a taluk of Tiruchirapalli district of the Indian state of Tamil Nadu. The headquarters of the taluk is the town of Srirangam.This taluk has a 1 to 6 wards of city as jurisdictional areas and some villages are under this taluk of Trichy.

== Demographics ==
According to the 2011 census, the taluk of Srirangam had a population of 210,361 with 104,734 males and 105,627 females. There were 1009 women for every 1000 men. The taluk had a literacy rate of 73.24. Child population in the age group below 6 was 10,813 Males and 10,445 Females.
