= Manavai Mustafa =

Patron of scientific Tamil literature (1935–2017)

- Born: 15 June 1935; Ilangakurichchi, Madras Presidency
- Died: 6 February 2017 (aged 81); Chennai, Tamil Nadu
- Occupation: writer
- Awards: Kalaimamani 1985; Thiru Vi Ka Award 1989

Manavai Mustafa (15 June 1935 – 6 February 2017) was an Indian Tamil scholar, editor, and writer known for his contributions to scientific Tamil literature, linguistic development, and translation. His work included translating and editing key texts and promoting the use of Tamil in science and technology.

== Early life ==
Born on 15 June 1935 in Ilangakurichchi near Manapparai, Madras Presidency, Mustafa grew up in Pilathu, a village near Dindigul. After schooling, he received his bachelor's degree from Jamal Mohamed College, Trichy, and his master's degree from Annamalai University. He was a student of Tamil scholar T. P. Meenakshisundaram at Annamalai University.

== Career ==
Mustafa held several important positions throughout his career. He served as the managing director of the Southern Languages Book Trust for 40 years and as the editor of the magazine Book Friend for four years. For 35 years, he edited the Tamil edition of the UNESCO Courier, an international monthly magazine. He also led the Tamil translation of the Encyclopedia Britannica.

He presented research papers at seven World Tamil Conferences between 1968 and 1995. Mustafa also worked on Tamil Nadu government committees, including the Tamil Nadu Higher Education Tamil Creative Committee and the Independence Golden Jubilee Committee, both chaired by the Chief Minister. In 1986, he organized a seminar on "Science and Technology Exchange" at Anna University.

Mustafa contributed to media development by participating in radio programs since 1965 and serving as a science consultant for Tamil Nadu and Pondicherry Radio Station. He was also a senior member of the Tamil Nadu Government's Television Advisory Committee before television broadcasting began in the state. Additionally, he served on the Film Censorship Committee from 1977 to 1986.

Mustafa supported Tamil's recognition as a classical language. He began advocating for the status in 1975, writing in newspapers and magazines. At the 1980 World Tamil Conference in Madurai, he addressed the issue in the presence of then Tamil Nadu Chief Minister M.G. Ramachandran, who asked him to submit a petition. Mustafa completed a detailed petition in 1982, outlining Tamil's qualifications based on its linguistic features compared to other classical languages. However, no immediate action was taken.

He authored several books on Tamil, science, technology, and medicine, including Islamum Samaya Nallinakamum (Islam and Religious Harmony), which won second prize in the Philosophy, Religion, Mathematics, and Ethics category of the Tamil Development Department's Best Books of 1996. His book Medical Terminology won first prize in the Special Publications category that same year. He has published eight glossaries on computers, medicine, and science and technology, and translated many books from English to Tamil including the history of the Indian National Army. He held leadership positions in several organizations, including the Tamil Writers’ Association and the International Tamil Research Council. He was the chairman of the Tamil Science Council (2006–2009) and the Scientific Tamil Foundation. He also served as a consultant for Tamil development at MGR Medical University.

== Recognition ==
Tamil Nadu government order to nationalise books of Manavai Mustafa

He has received more than 40 titles and awards, including Kalaimamani in 1985, Thiru. Vi. Ka. Award in 1989, Valar Tamil Selvar, Ariviyal Tamil Vidhagar Award in 1995, Raja Sir Muthaiah Chettiar Award in 1995, and the Chicago Tamil Mandram's Seva Ratna Award in 1998. On 31 March 2010, then Tamil Nadu Chief Minister Karunanidhi announced that Mustafa's books would be declared national property in recognition of his contributions.

== Death ==
Manavai Mustafa died on 6 February 2017 in Chennai at the age of 81.
