= Marungapuri =

- Panchayat town
- மருங்காபுரி
- Location in Tamil Nadu, India Marungapuri (India)
- Coordinates: 10°33′00″N 78°22′28″E
- Country: India
- State: Tamil Nadu
- District: Tiruchirappalli
- Taluk: Marungapuri
- Founder: Tiruchirappalli

Government
  - Type: Nagar Panchayat
  - Body: Local government in Tamil Nadu

Population (2011)
  - Total: 10,831

Languages
  - Official: Tamil
- Time zone: UTC+5:30 (IST)
- Postal code: 621308

Marungapuri is a panchayat town and Taluk in Tiruchirappalli district in the Indian state of Tamil Nadu.

== Politics ==
Manaparai is the headquarters of Manapparai Legislative Assembly Constituency, which is part of the Karur Loksabha Constituency.

== See also ==
- Marungapuri block
- Marungapuri taluk
- Marungapuri Assembly constituency
