= V.S.K.Valasai =

- City
- Nicknames: Valasai, Valasu
- Location in Tamil Nadu, India V.S.K.Valasai (India)
- Coordinates: 10.3154°N 78.1513°E
- Country: India
- State: Tamil Nadu
- District: Dindigul
- Elevation: 320 m (1,050 ft)

Population (2011)
  - Total: 865

Languages
  - Official: Tamil
- Time zone: UTC+5:30 (IST)
- Postal code: 624306

V.S.K.Valasai (also known as Valasai or Valasu) is a city in Dindigul district in the Indian state of Tamil Nadu.

== Geography ==
V.S.K.Valasai is located 10.3154°N 78.1513°E near the Western versant of Karandamalai Reserved Forest, and 27 km (17 mi) East of the District capital, Dindigul and 26 km (16 mi) away from Natham. The Major District Road-1111 (from Kanavaipatti to Ayyalur) is passing via V.S.K.Valasai, which connects National Highway-45 and SH-35 roads.

Karandhamalai Reserved Forest is the nearby Hill area, which is located nearly 700 meters from the village. The Major District Road-1111 (from Kanavaipatti to Ayyalur) passes via Karandhamalai Forest and is about 4 kilometers. This four kilometer way is surrounded by trees and has eight hairpin bends. There are several mountains and peaks, which will give an eagle view of V.S.K.Valasai and Dindigul East area. Also, these peaks are quiet good for trekking. There are few permanent waterfalls and many seasonable waterfalls. There are many animals and reptiles in this forest.

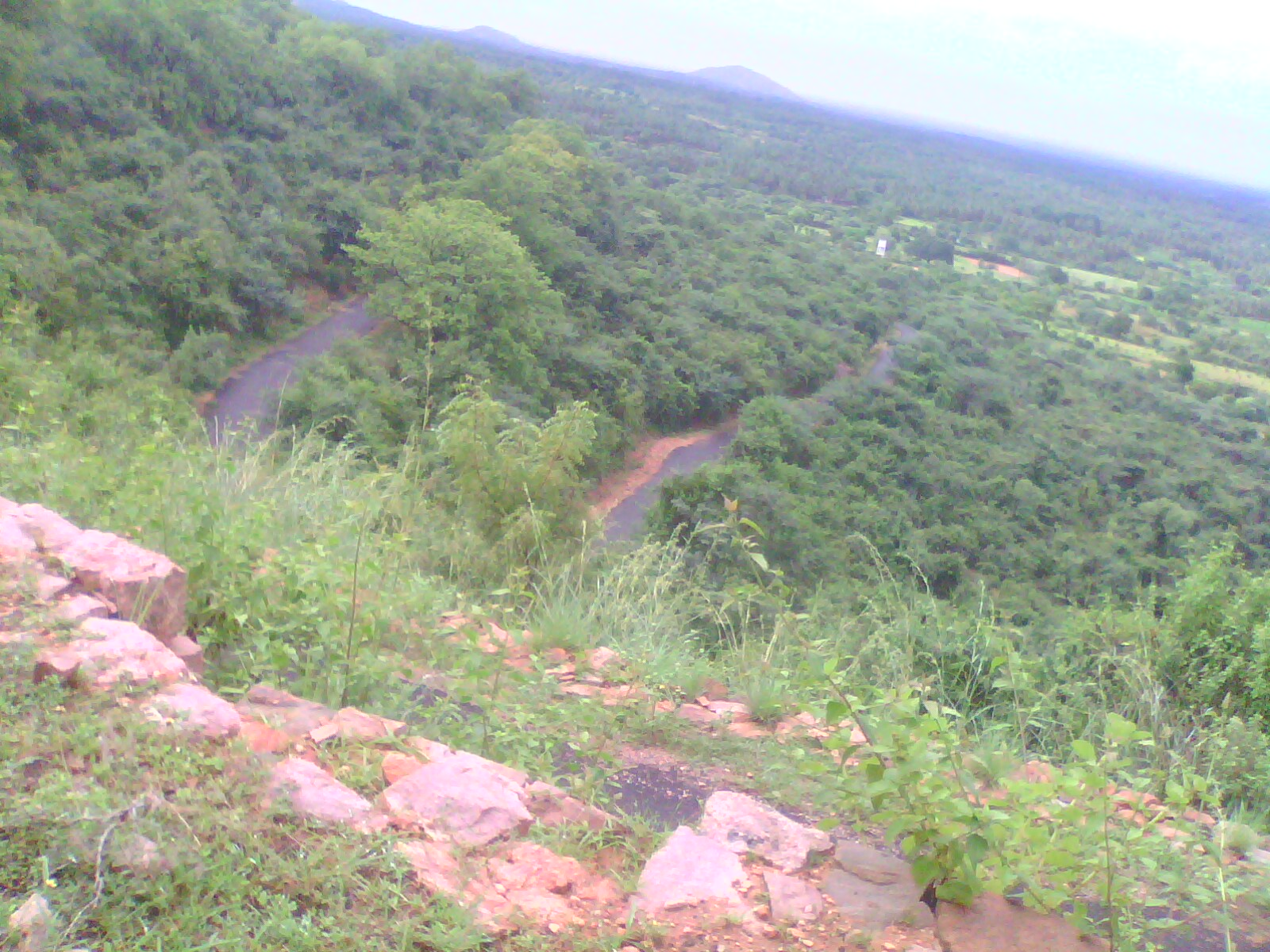
View from 2nd hairpin bend

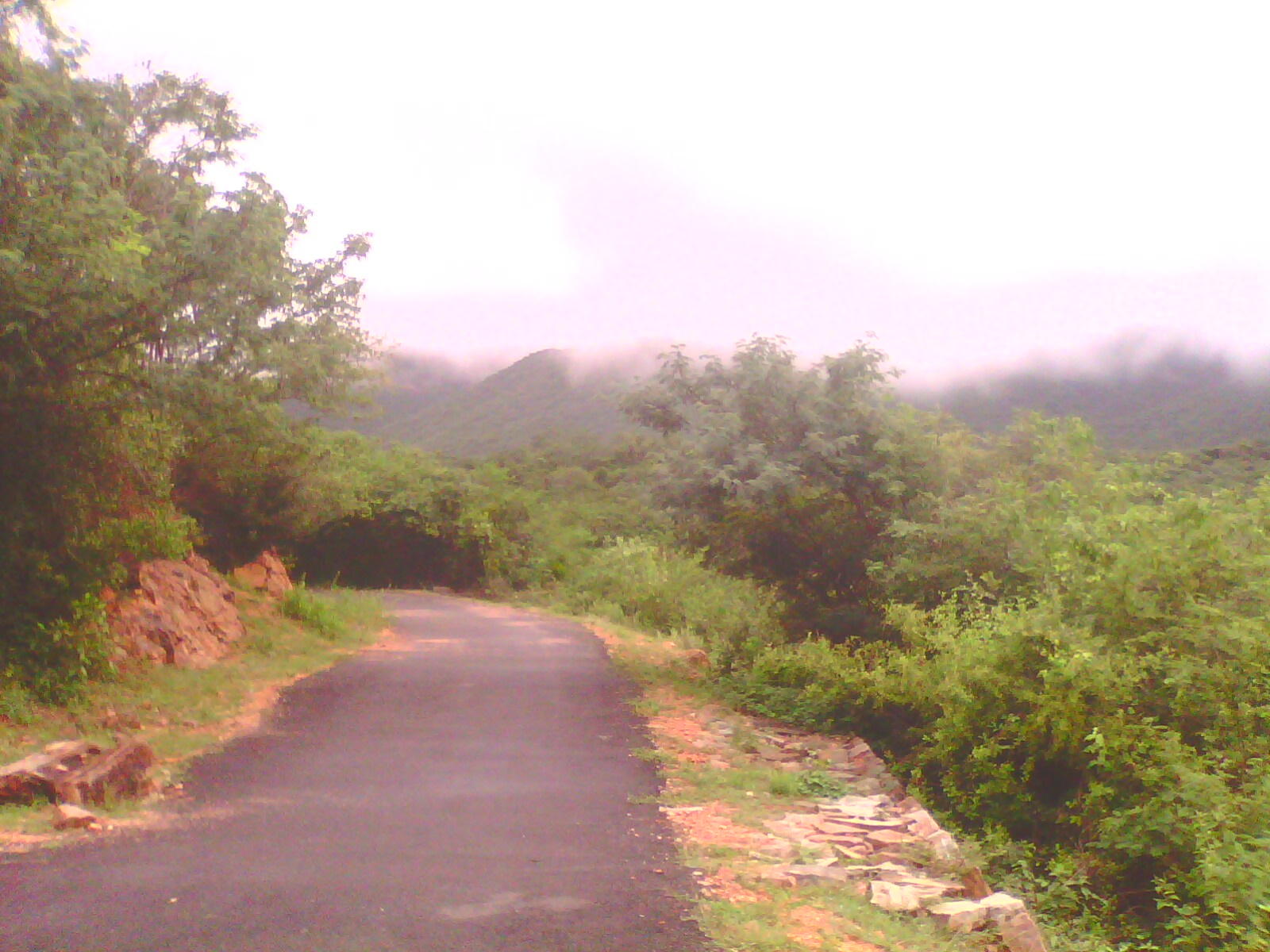
Karandhamalai Forest road.

== Demographics ==
As of 2011 India census, V.S.K.Valasai had a population of 865. Males constitute 50% of the population and females 50%. In V.S.K.Valasai, 12% of the population is under 6 years of age.

== Religion ==
Pidaariyamman Temple and Sellaandiyamman Temple are run by the Tamil Nadu Hindu Religious & Charitable Endowments Department.

Pidaariyamman Kovil & Thiruvizha:(Hindu Temple) This is a big and famous temple at Valasai. Every Friday and Special pooja day many people visit the temple. The famous festival (in Tamil called Thiruvizha) on this temple celebrated every three year. This festival is celebrated for about 17 days. It is not just a Temple ritual, but is a grand festival for the whole village. Around 30 village peoples nearby this place will come with their families and celebrate. It begins with Kaappu Kattuthal and concludes with Poo Palaku (procession in flower decorated pallaku). On each day, the Amman (The Deities) will be nicely decorated and taken in procession, once in the morning and once in the evening. All the schools are closed for a week. For children there are Giant Wheel, Balloon Shooting for Kids, On the spot Toys Store, Music Shows, and nightly dance shows. The Village Festival ("Kovil Thiruvizha") was last celebrated in July 13 to 27, 28 and 29 of 2018. The Arulmighu Pidaariyamman Kovil Thoranavoil was designed, constructed and donated by Dr.C.P.Chandran (S/O C.Ponniah & Pitchaiammal)- S.Rajathi Chandran - Manekanda Siddharth Chandran & Family in the year 2014 (Upaiyatharar).

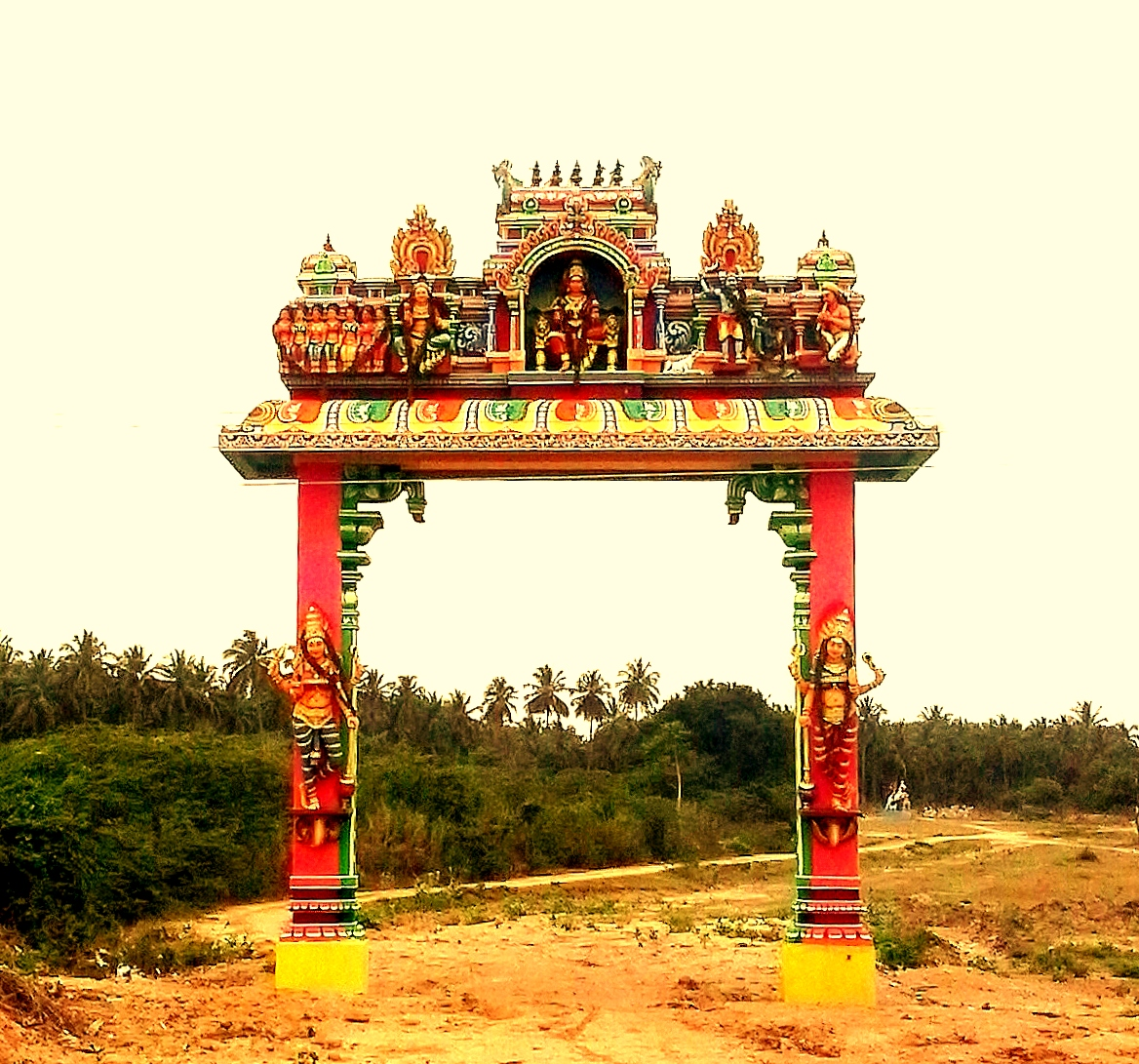
Arulmighu Pidaariyamman Kovil Thoranavoil - Designed, constructed and donated by Dr.C.P.Chandran (S/O C.Ponniah & P.Pitchaiammal) - S.Rajathi Chandran - Manekanda Siddharth Chandran & Family in the year 2014.

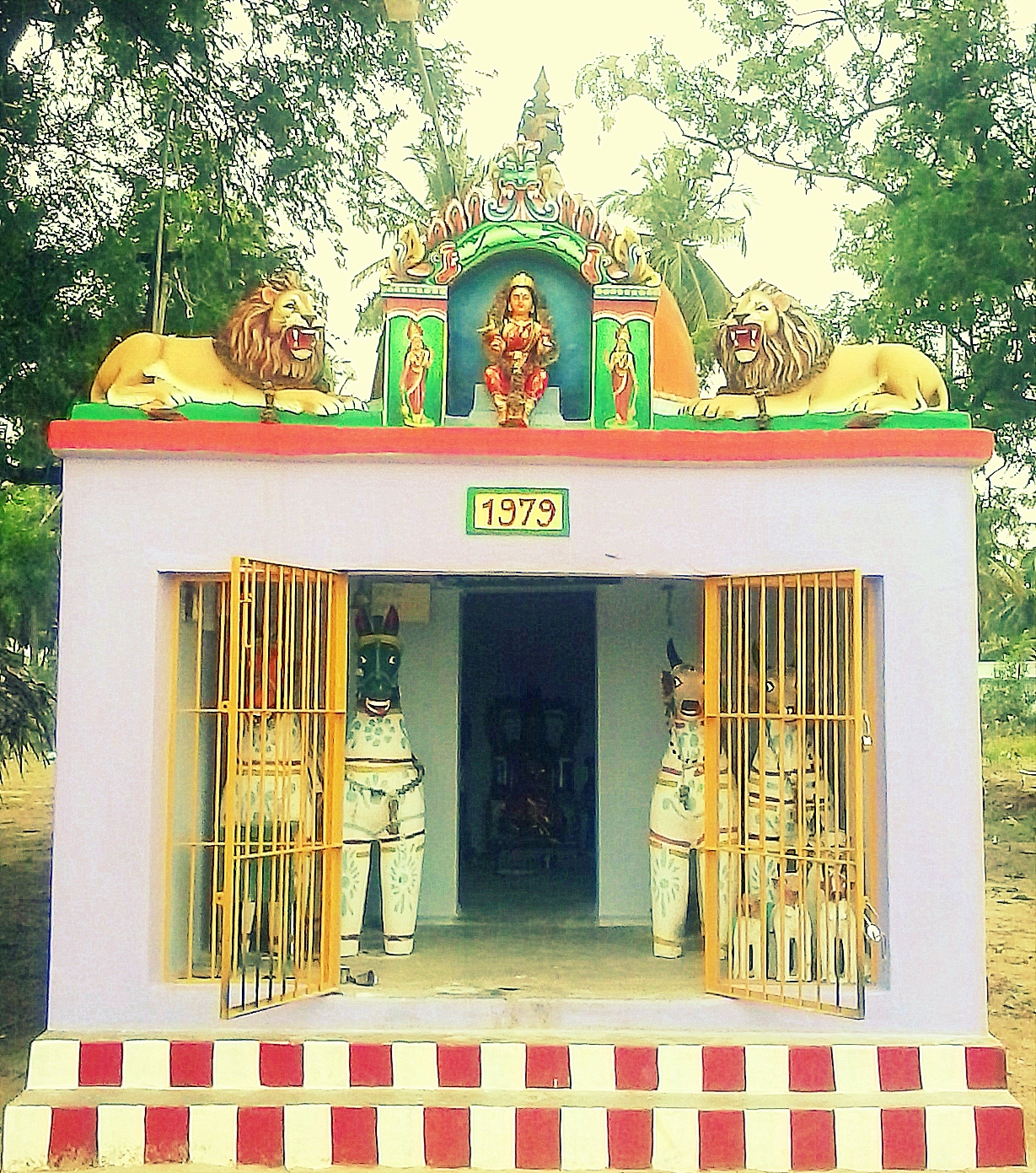
Pidaariyamman Kovil

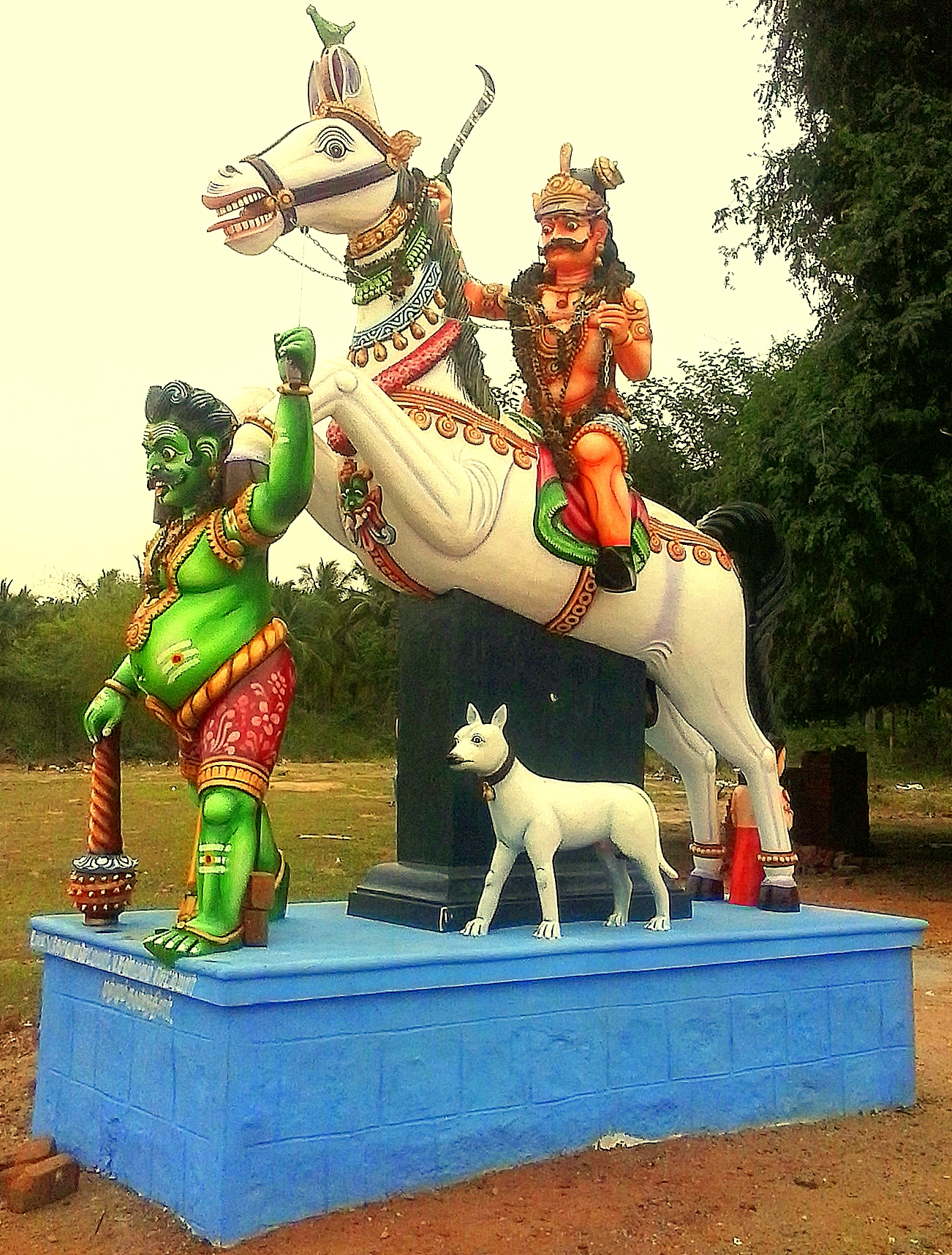
Karuppa Saami (Right Side)

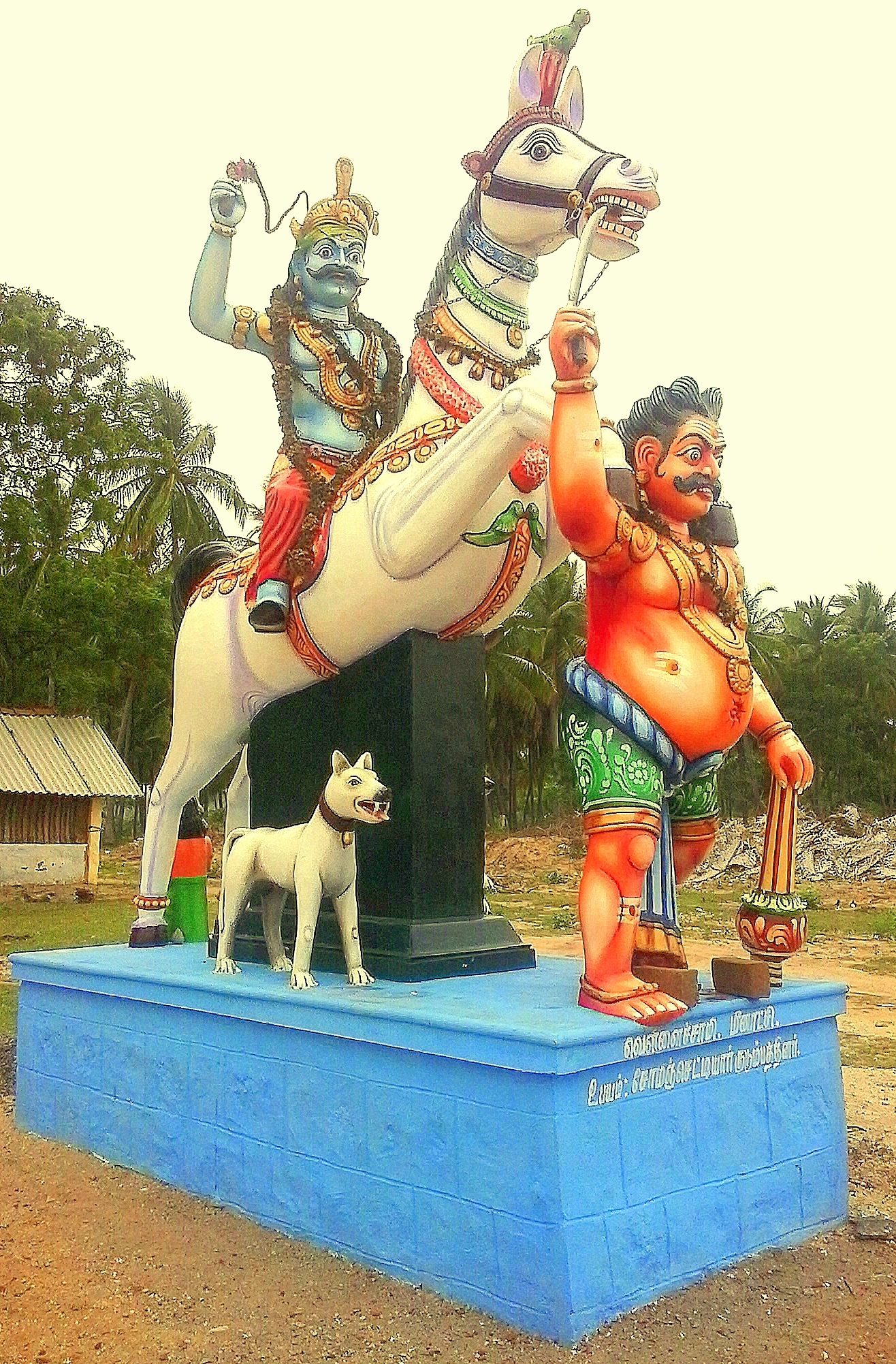
Karuppa Saami (Left Side)

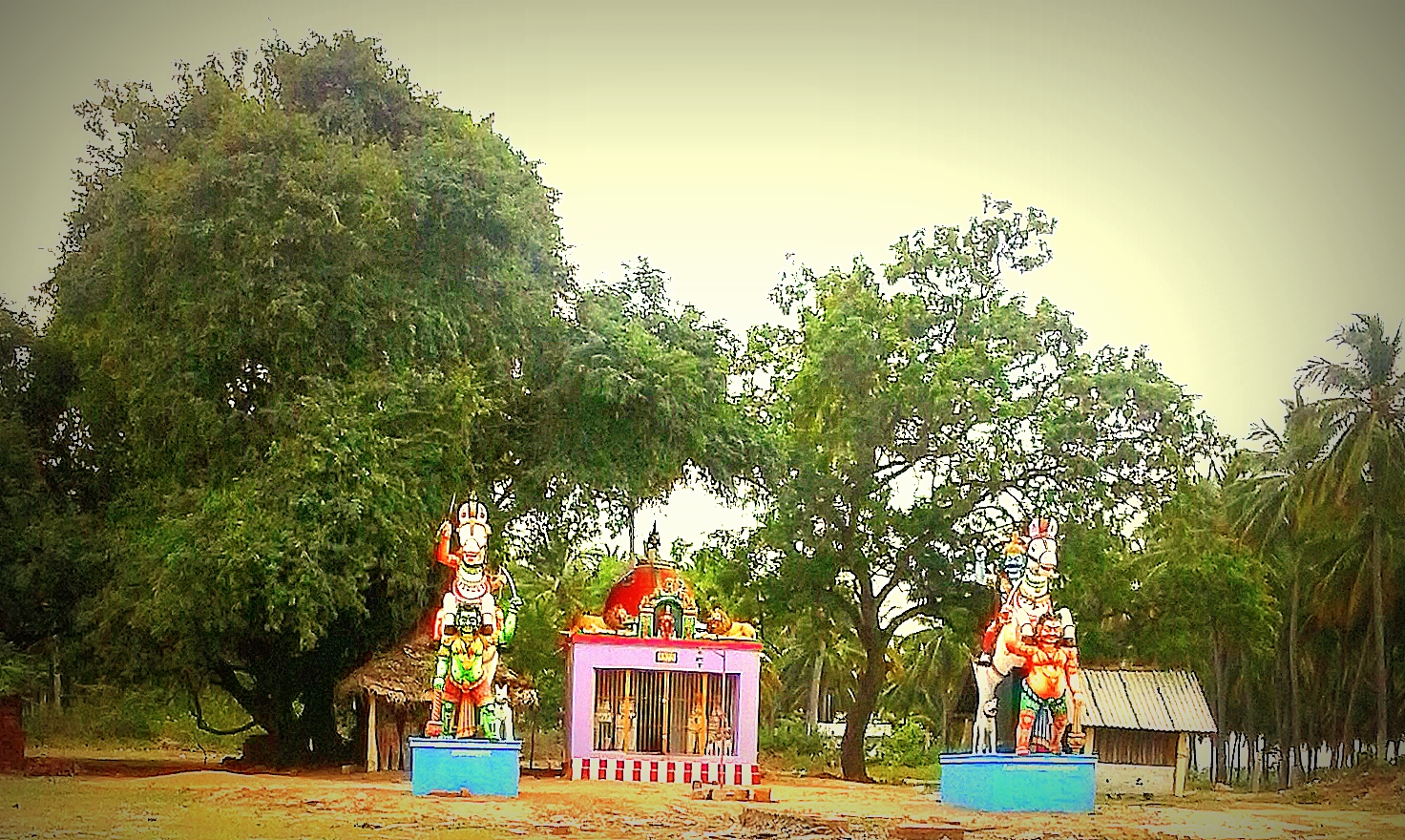
Pidaariyamman Temple Long view

== Education ==
1. Sri Narasimman School (Completed 30 Years)

== Livelihood ==
V.S.K. Valasai is the place, where coconut, tamarind, flowers, tomato and other vegetables have been exported to nearby markets such as Ottanchatram, Dindigul, Natham and Gopalpatti markets. V.S.K. Valasai contributes more to bring this name "Dindigul: The Holland of Tamil Nadu".

Tamarind and Mangos has been collected by local business man's and exported to other countries. Farmers sell their coconuts in Ottanchatram Market and from there, the coconuts are exported to other countries. Flowers have been exported from Dindigul Flower Market to elsewhere in the country. Tomato and other vegetable has been exported from here to Ottanchatram Vegetable market.
