= State Highway 71A (Tamil Nadu) =

Road in Tamil Nadu, India

State Highway 71A

Route information
- Auxiliary route of SH 71
- Maintained by Highways and Minor Ports Department
- Length: 28.00 km (17.40 mi)

Major junctions
- From: Manapparai, Tiruchirappalli district, Tamil Nadu
- To: Thuvarankurichi, Tiruchirappalli district, Tamil Nadu

Location
- Country: India
- State: Tamil Nadu
- Districts: Trichy

Highway system
- Roads in India; Expressways; National; State; Asian; State Highways in Tamil Nadu
← SH 71	→ NH 38

Tamil Nadu State Highway 71A (SH-71A) is a State Highway maintained by the Highways Department of Government of Tamil Nadu. It connects Manapparai with Thuvarankurichi in Tiruchirappalli district, Tamil Nadu.

== Route ==
The total length of the SH-71A is 28.00 kilometres (17.40 mi). The route is from Manapparai to Thuvarankurichi, via Poigaipatty, Pannankombu, Idaiyappatti, Puthanatham, Karumalai, Kallakampatti. This road connects Kulithalai and Manapparai with Madurai and Melur.

== See also ==
- Highways of Tamil Nadu
