= PSNA =

PSNA may refer to:

- The PSN Authority, the regulatory body of the UK Public Services Network
- PSNA College of Engineering and Technology, a college in Dindigul, India
