= Coleophora thiophaea =

Scientific classification
- Kingdom: Animalia
- Phylum: Arthropoda
- Class: Insecta
- Order: Lepidoptera
- Family: Coleophoridae
- Genus: Coleophora
- Species: C. thiophaea

Binomial name
- Coleophora thiophaea Meyrick, 1917

Species of moth

Coleophora thiophaea is a moth of the family Coleophoridae. It is found in south-eastern India (Dindigul, Tamil Nadu).

It's wingspan is about 11 mm.
