= Elangakurichy =

Elangakurichy இளங்காகுறிச்சி
- Village
- Elangakurichy
- Location in Tamil Nadu, India Elangakurichy (India)
- Coordinates: 10.5417°N 78.3321°E
- Country: India
- State: Tamil Nadu
- District: Tiruchirappalli
- Elevation: 180 m (590 ft)

Population (2011)
  - Total: 5,000

Languages
  - Official: Tamil
- Time zone: UTC+5:30 (IST)
- PIN: 621302
- Vehicle registration: TN 45
- Sex ratio: 1009 without NRI males ♂/♀

Elangakurichy is a traditional village in Tiruchirappalli district, in the Indian state of Tamil Nadu, and it is located near Vaiyampatty, Manapparai. It is located almost at the geographic centre of the state, at a distance of 56 kilometres south-west of Tiruchirappalli and 50 kilometres north-east of Dindigul on national highway NH 45. Formerly this village is known for its Tobacco manufacturing business by its villages as its the main source of income upto 1980's. Majority of the Muslim people living here are Tamil speakers Ravuthars.

== Etymology ==
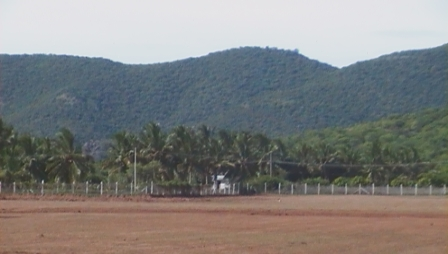
Elangakurichy periyamalai

Elangakurichy is believed to have been named sing a pure Tamil word (Elangakurichy = ilanga + Kurinji) which means 'grace or beauty of a mountainous area'. The first word ilanga means 'characterized by beauty of movement, style, form, or execution', suggesting taste, ease, and wealth. The second word Kurinji means 'Mountainous region'.

== Geography and climate of village ==
=== Geography ===
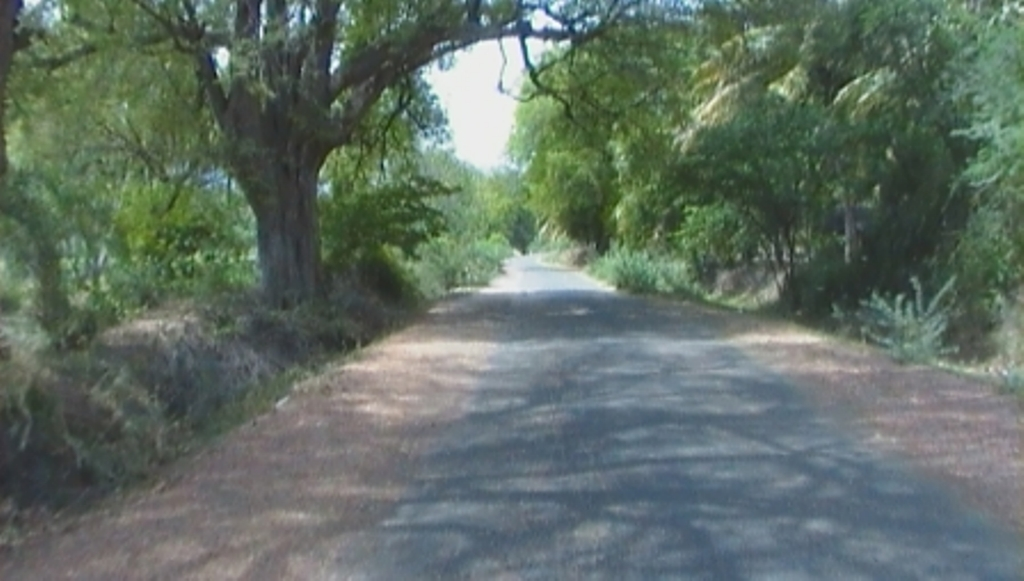
Azad road to Elangakurichy

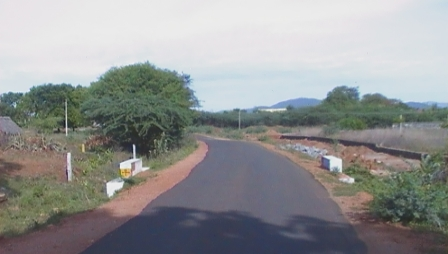
Another Way to Elangakurichy

Elangakurichy is located at Coordinates: 10°32'30.2"N, 78°19'55.6"E. It has an average elevation of 179 metres (564 feet). Elangakurichy covers 3.2 square miles (8.3 km^{2}) and it is located in north of the Karuppur Reddiyapatti RF hills. To the northern side of the village is Azad Road junction(NH 45); to the eastern side is Kavalkarapatti(Madurai SH) and to the Northwestern side is Vaiyampatti town(NH 45). In contrast to Elangakurichy's mixed urban and rural atmosphere, the vast majority of the village is dominated by farms, forests, a pond and mountains.

=== Climate ===
The climate of Elangakurichy is tropical with little variation in summer and winter temperatures. While April–August is the hottest summer period, with the temperature rising to 38 °C, November–February is the coolest winter period with temperatures hovering around 22 °C, making the climate quite pleasant. Elangakurichy gets all its rain from the North-east Monsoons between October and December but recently rainy season is changing in entire tamilnadu due to global warming plus Western Ghats. Western Ghats (located in Kerala ) absorb all the rainfall cyclones from bay of Bengal as well as Arabian Sea . This is one of the main reason Tamilnadu not getting proper rainfall.

== Demographics ==
According to the Census of India 2011, Elangakurichy had a population of 4214. Males constitute 49.55% of the population and females 50.45%.Female population is more due to non registry of NRI's.

According to the voter list of the Tamil Nadu state government, 2011, over (76.15%) were muslims and the remaining 23.85% were Hindus.

Elangakurichy had an average literacy rate of 71.76%, lower than the national average of 74.04%; male literacy was 77.9%, and female literacy was 66.05%.

The village human sex ratio is 1009 females per 1,000 males. In 2001 census, female sex ratio is less than male. The main reason for increase in female sex ratio is non-inclusion of Non residents Indian (NRI) who went abroad for works. The real female sex ratio is dropped to 906 per 1000 males. Due to decreased female ratio, grooms are forced to search a bride outside the village circle.

== Culture ==
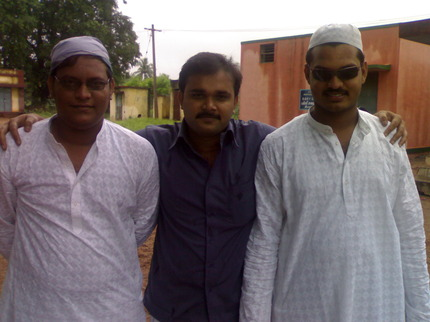
Two men standing in Traditional Dress

Elangakurichy has multi-generational patriarchal joint families, although nuclear families are becoming common in the 21st century. An overwhelming number of villagers have their marriages arranged by their parents and other respected family members, with the consent of the bride and groom. Marriage is thought to be for life, and the divorce rate is extremely low. Child marriage is not practiced in Elangakurichy.

Popular styles of dress include draped garments such as the sari and thavani for women, and the vesti and lungi for men; in addition, stitched clothes such as chudidar for women and European-style trousers and shirts for men, are also popular.

== Cuisine ==
The staple foods in the village are rice and rice products. Early morning, after arising from sleep, they will drink dairy products like fresh milk, or tea with milk. They will eat a breakfast such as Idly, Dosai, appam, uthappam, Pal vilanga, Veg Thikkadi, Mutton Thikkadi, Idiyappam, Parotta paniyaram or puri. For lunch—normally rice with many of the vegetable curries and non-vegetable curries and poriyal ( boiled vegetable with chilly powder) too. Anam means a masal or mixture of food with water. Different type of anam are kari anam (chicken or mutton masal), mean anam (fish masal), vendaika anam, pavaka anam, kaikari anam (vegetable masal), membudi anam (mutton masal with extra pepper), manja thanni≤ (mutton with turmeric), pulisaru, sambar, rasam, vatha kulambu. For dinner, villagers usually cook extra food similar to lunch and if there is any need, they will cook dosai (a type of thin crisp pancake).

=== Special food ===
Nowhere in Tamilnadu will cook pavakkai with meat. Only elangakurichy villagers are cooking pavakkai Anam with meat.

== Source of income ==
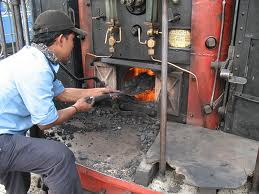
Sinter contract in Elangakurichy(1980)

Elangakurichy is not only a traditional village, basically an agricultural village with some industries like manufacturing of match box, sweats etc. Initially Elangakurichy people were engaged in agriculture, but during the 1910s some of them shifted to the tobacco business. But the government of Indira Gandhi slightly changed the laws concerning tobacco with higher taxation to reduce the consumption of cigarettes (piti). Many people who engaged in the tobacco business were lower middle income people, they could not get a special license and can't afford higher taxation. So, their work was stopped by Government. Then many people who had grown tobacco, and other businessmen took up Sintering contracting. This raised living standards for many peoples. At the end of the 20th century (1992) coal powered trains were replaced by diesel powered ones. Many people who had only sinter contracts were seriously affected.

=== Agriculture ===
The village produces coconuts, groundnuts, mango, paddy rice, tomato and other vegetables. A lot of farms are irrigated from wells, as well as rain water irrigation. Rain water irrigation is used for the groundnut fields.

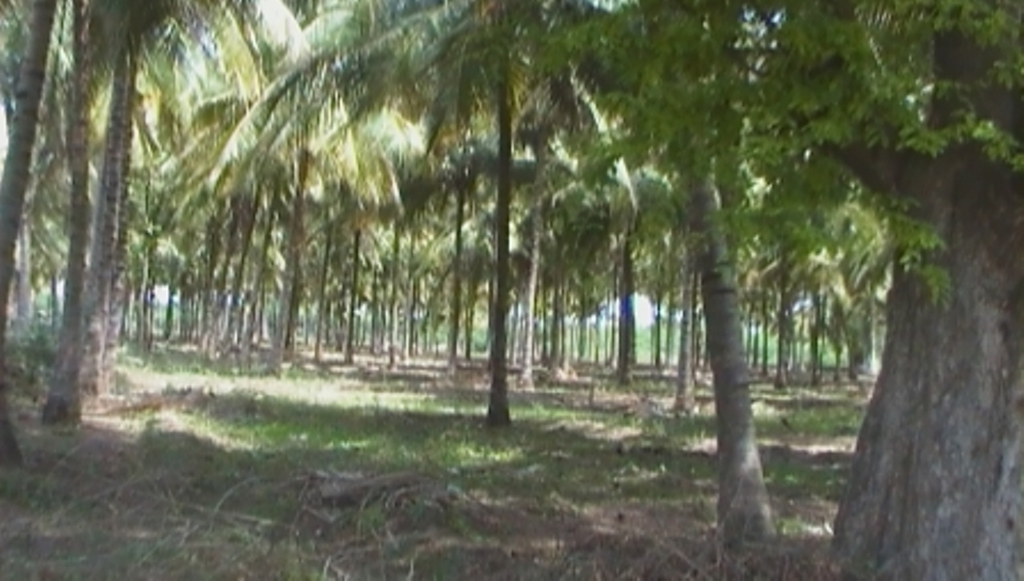
Another Coconut estate

=== Shopkeepers ===
Many of the Elangakurichy people have individual businesses like pharmacy, grocery shops, hotels, hardware and paint shops, garment manufacturing, foot wear in nearby cities and towns like Manapparai, Vaiyampatty, and Dindigul.

=== Overseas employed ===
The Elangakurichy village youths are working in various countries in the world. Those countries are Azerbaijan, United Arab Emirates, Saudi Arabia, Oman, Qatar, Bahrain, Kuwait, Malaysia, Singapore, South Africa, Australia, United States of America and More

=== Others ===
A many educated people are working in Chennai and other parts of the India. A very few peoples are in government jobs.

== Places of worship ==
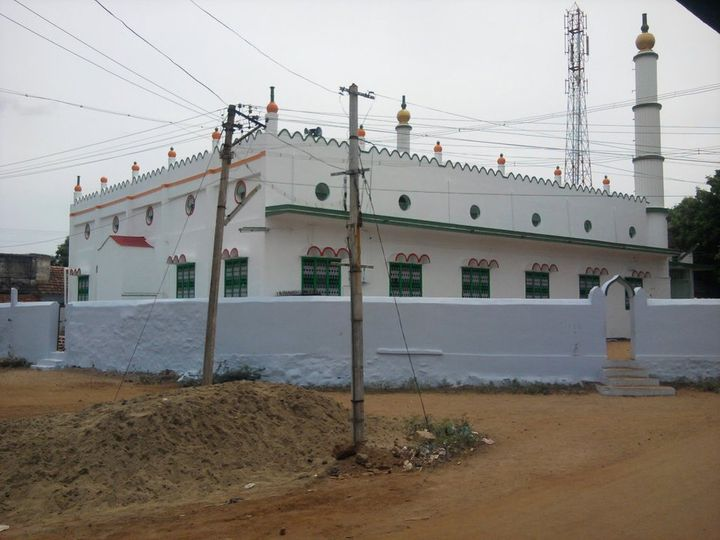
Elangakurichy Jumma Masjid

- Juma masjid is located in the heart of the village, five times per day, prayer is held. The Masjid is administered by elected members through ballot votes from jamaath peoples. This elections are conducted by Tamilnadu Wakf Board and elected members taken incharge on 8 November 2018.
- Mariamman Temple is located in the village.
- A Catholic church is located near to the village but (3 km) outside the boundary.

== Banking ==
Elangakurichy is business hub for the Vaiyampatti region, so a State Bank of India branch is located in the village.

== Postal service ==
An Indian Postal Department branch is located in the village. Elangakurichy has its own postal code - 621302.

== Education ==
- S.N.M. Crescent Nursery & Primary School, Elangakurichy
- Government higher secondary school, Elangakurichy
- Government primary school for boys, Elangakurichy
- Government primary school for girls, Elangakurichy
- Islamic education center, Elangakurichy

== Transport ==
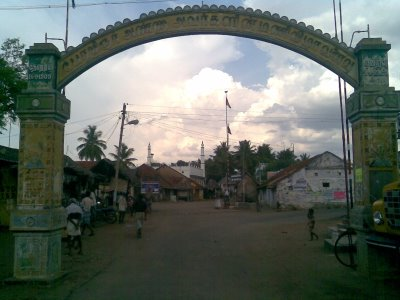
Anna Valavu

The village is well connected to other parts of Trichy and Tamil Nadu through National Highway 45 and by the railway network. National Highway 45 passes by, 2 km from village. This NH-45 connects Trichy and Dindigul. Transport is provided by the State owned Tamil Nadu State Transport Corporation (TNSTC), and private bus transport, directly connects Pudukkottai. Recently the state capital Chennai was connected to Elangakurichy by the Tamil Nadu State Transport Corporation.

| Nearby cities | Distance |
|---|---|
| Dindigul | 50 km |
| Karur | 60 km |
| Trichy | 56 km |
| Manapparai | 15 km |
| Madurai | 90 km |
