= Thuvarankurichi =

Thuvarankurichi துவரங்குறிச்சி Thuvarankurichy Tovarankurichi
- Town
- Thuvarankurichi
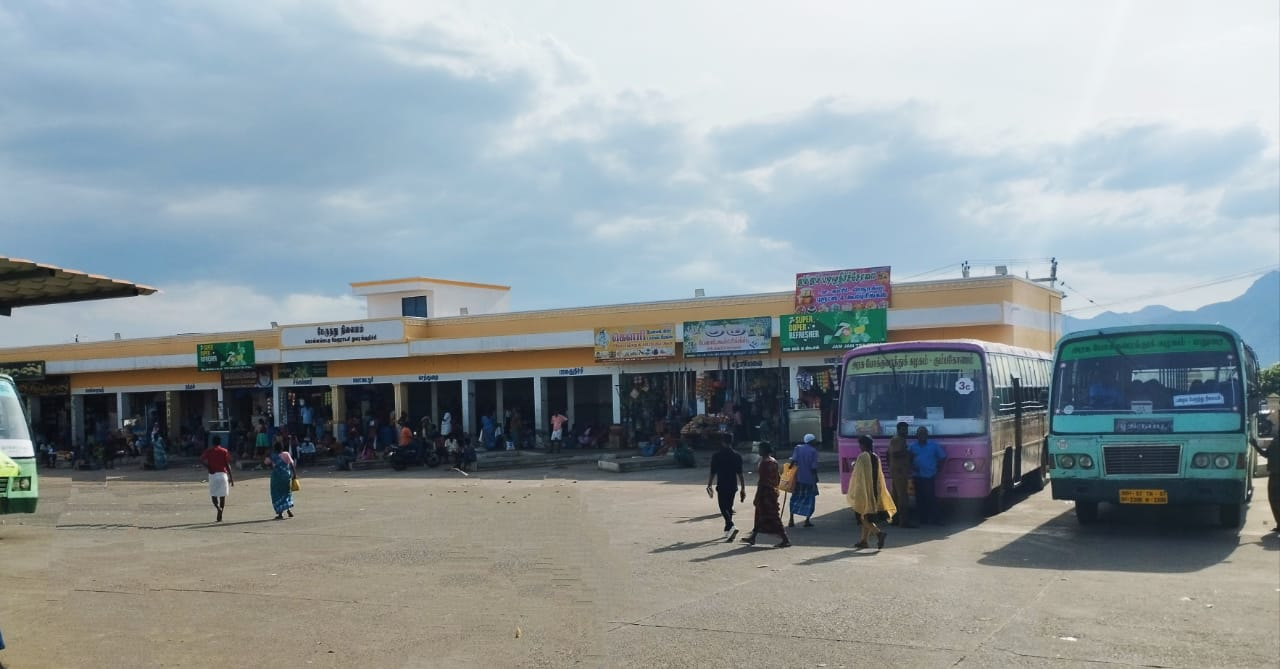
- Image of Thuvarankurichi bus stand

- Location within Tamil Nadu Location within India
- Coordinates: 10°22′33″N 78°23′14″E
- Country: India
- State: Tamil Nadu
- District: Tiruchirappalli
- Taluk: Marungapuri

Government
  - Type: Town Panchayat
  - Body: Ponnampatti Town Panchayat

Population (2011)
  - Total: 12,167
  - Estimate (2023): 16,600
- Time zone: UTC+5:30 (Indian Standard Time)
- PIN: 621314
- Vehicle registration: TN 45

Thuvarankurichi (also spelled as Tovarankurichchi or Thuvarankurichy) is a town in Tiruchirappalli district in the Chola Nadu region of the Indian state of Tamil Nadu. It is situated 65 kilometers away from both Tiruchirappalli and Madurai.It is also meeting point of 5 districts: Tiruchirappalli, Madurai, Dindigul, Pudukkottai,Sivaganga. The town is located within the drainage basin of the Vellar River Raja college of Allied Health Science and Hotel Management College located at Thuvarankurichi.

== Demographics ==
Religious census
| Religion | Percent(%) |
| Hindu | 58.85% |
| Muslim | 38.14% |
| Christian | 2.95% |
| Other | 0.01% |
| No religion | 0.06% |

As of 2011 census, the total population of the town is 12,167 of which 6,098 are men and 6,069 are women. The average literacy of the town was 72.01% which is slightly lesser than the national average of 72.99%. The town has 2,686 households. Thuvarankurichi population composed of 58.85% Hindus, 38.14% Muslims, 2.95% Christians, 0.01% people following other religion and 0.06% people who follow no religion.

== Administration ==
The local body responsible for the governance of the town is Ponnampatti Town Panchayat. The Town panchayat has won the "best town panchayat" award from Government of Tamil Nadu in 2017. The town comes under Marungapuri Taluk and Block of Tiruchirappalli district. The town falls under Manapparai State Assembly Constituency and Karur Lok Sabha Constituency.

== Transport ==
The town is located on National Highway 38 which connects Thuvarankurichi with major cities of Tamil Nadu like Trichy, Madurai, Dindigul, Pudukkottai, Sivaganga, Karaikkudi, Karur, Tiruppur, Thoothukudi and Chennai by road. The town is also connected with Natham and Madurai by National Highway 785, this is Shortest National Highway in Tamilnadu. State highways 71A connects the town with Manapparai and an Other district road connects the town with Palakkurichi.

The town has a bus stand. Thuvarankurichi is connected with Trichy, Madurai, Manapparai, Palakkurichi, Singampunari, Ponnamaravathy, Kottampatti, Melur and Natham with frequent bus services along with scheduled bus services to Chennai and Tiruppur.

The nearest railway stations are Vaiyampatti (28 km), Manapparai (30 km), Madurai junction (66 km) and Tiruchirappalli Junction (66 km).

The nearest airports are Tiruchirappalli International airport (62 km) and Madurai International airport (80 km).

== Gallery ==
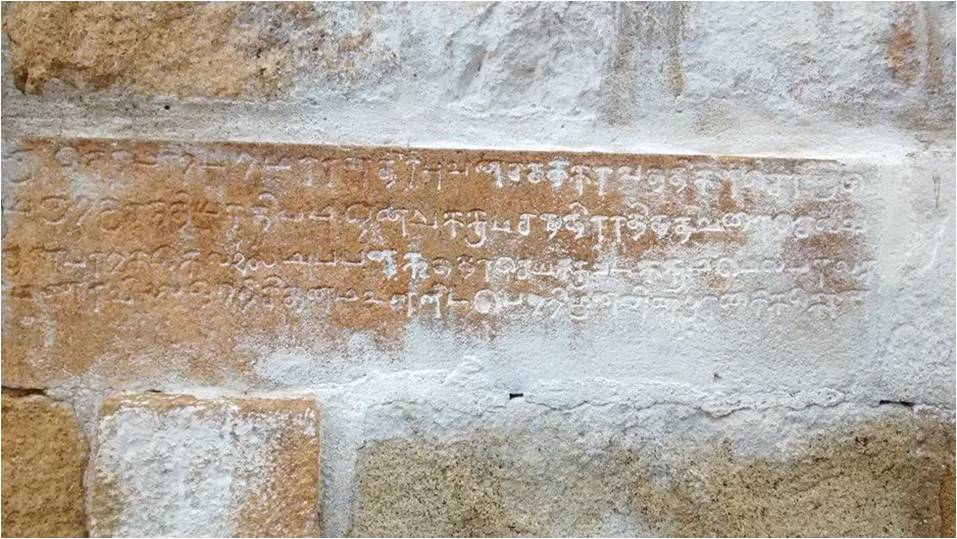
Inscriptions on a mountain in Thuvarankurichi

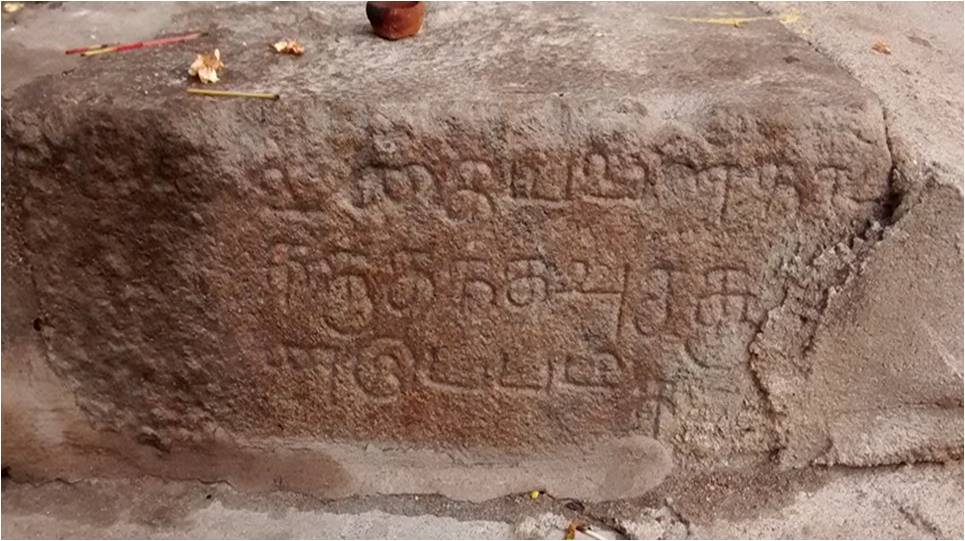
Inscriptions on a mountain in Thuvarankurichi
