= List of cities in Tamil Nadu by population =

The following are the cities in the state of Tamil Nadu, India, which have a population of 1 lakh (100,000) and above (city / corporation area only), based on the 2011 census conducted by Government of India.

\
Cities in Tamil Nadu With Populations > 100,000

== List of Cities in Tamil Nadu ==
S.No	Name	District	Population in 2011
1	Chennai	Chennai	4,681,087
2	Coimbatore	Coimbatore	1,061,447
3	Madurai	Madurai	1,016,885
4	Tiruchirappalli	Tiruchirappalli	846,915
5	Salem	Salem	831,038
6	Ambattur	Chennai	478,134
7	Tirunelveli	Tirunelveli	474,838
8	Tiruppur	Tiruppur	444,543
9	Avadi	Thiruvallur	344,701
10	Tiruvottiyur	Chennai	248,059
11	Thoothukkudi	Thoothukkudi	237,374
12	Nagercoil	Kanniyakumari	224,329
13	Thanjavur	Thanjavur	222,619
14	Pallavaram	Chengalpattu	216,308
15	Dindigul	Dindigul	207,225
16	Vellore	Vellore	185,895
17	Tambaram	Chengalpattu	176,807
18	Cuddalore	Cuddalore	173,361
19	Kancheepuram	Kancheepuram	164,265
20	Alandur	Chennai	164,162
21	Erode	Erode	156,953
22	Tiruvannamalai	Tiruvannamalai	144,683
23	Kumbakonam	Thanjavur	140,113
24	Rajapalayam	Virudhunagar	130,119
25	Kurichi	Coimbatore	125,800
26	Madavaram	Chennai	118,525
27	Pudukkottai	Pudukkottai	117,215
28	Hosur	Krishnagiri	116,821
29	Ambur	Tirupattur	113,856
30	Karaikkudi	Sivagangai	106,793
31	Neyveli	Cuddalore	105,687
32	Nagapattinam	Nagapattinam	102,838

== See also ==
- List of metropolitan areas in Tamil Nadu
- List of urban agglomerations in Tamil Nadu
