= State Highway 71 (Tamil Nadu) =

Road in Tamil Nadu, India

State Highway 71

Route information
- Maintained by Highways and Minor Ports Department
- Length: 150.69 km (93.63 mi)

Major junctions
- From: Musiri, Tiruchirappalli district, Tamil Nadu
- To: Peravurani, Thanjavur district, Tamil Nadu

Location
- Country: India
- State: Tamil Nadu
- Districts: Trichy, Karur, Pudukkottai and Thanjavur.

Highway system
- Roads in India; Expressways; National; State; Asian; State Highways in Tamil Nadu

Tamil Nadu State Highway 71 (SH-71) is a State Highway maintained by the Highways Department of Government of Tamil Nadu. It connects Musiri (Tiruchirappalli district) with Sethubavachathiram (Thanjavur district) in Tamil Nadu.

== Route ==
The total length of the SH-71 is 150.69 kilometres (93.63 mi). The route is from Musiri – Sethubavachathiram, via Kulithalai, Pudukkottai and Alangudi.

The main towns through which this highway passes are:

- Kulithalai
- Thogaimalai
- Manapparai
- Viralimalai
- Iluppur
- Annavasal
- Pudukkottai
- Alangudi
- Aavanam Kaikatti
- Peravurani

== See also ==
- Highways of Tamil Nadu
