= Ayyalur =

- Town
- Nickname: C.K
- Location in Tamil Nadu, India
- Coordinates: 10°28′29″N 78°10′1″E
- Country: India
- State: Tamil Nadu
- District: Dindigul
- Zone: Madurai

Area
  - Total: 2 km^{2} (0.77 sq mi)

Population (2001)
  - Total: 14,362
  - Density: 7,200/km^{2} (19,000/sq mi)

Languages
  - Official: Tamil
- Time zone: UTC+5:30 (IST)
- Postal code: 624801
- Vehicle registration: TN-57
- Website: vadugapatti

Ayyalur is a panchayat town in Dindigul district at Madurai Region in the state of Tamil Nadu, India.

== Demographics ==
As of 2001 India census, Ayyalur had a population of 14,362. Males constitute 50% of the population and females 50%. Ayyalur has an average literacy rate of 53%, lower than the national average of 59.5%; with 60% of the males and 40% of females literate. 12% of the population is under 6 years of age. It is 25km from Dindigal city via the NH45.
