= Manapparai Murukku =

Indian snack food

Manapparai Murukku is a variety of murukku, a traditional Indian snack from the town of Manapparai in Tiruchirappalli district in the state of Tamil Nadu. Murukku derives from the Tamil word for 'twisted', which refers to its shape. Before Independence, Krishna Iyer started a cottage industry making murukku, and sold it first in Manapparai. In 2010, the Tamil Nadu government applied for a geographical indication tag for Manapparai Murukku; it was approved in 2023.

Once when Mahatma Gandhi came to the Manapparai Railway junction, he happily told his friends about its taste after eating Manapparai Murukku. It was the ideal South Indian travel snack. Later the industry was taken over by immigrants from Usilampatti, Madurai. Beginning in 1951, one migrant named Meesaikkarar (also known as Kasimaya Thevar) and his relatives began to apply special techniques and added more flavors. He is said to have made murukku famous as Manapparai Murukku.

== Preparation ==
Ingredients such as rice flour, cumin seeds, gingelly, asafetida, ajwain (omam), salt, water and oil are used to make Manapparai Murukku. All ingredients are mixed with flour. Then, water is added little by little, as it is kneaded into a thick batter. Afterward, it is patted by the murukku maker and rotated to form coils. It is then set aside for two minutes. It is then fried in oil, then set aside again, and the process repeated. It has to be stored in an air-tight container. To add richness, butter or ghee can be added.

== Industry ==
Manapparai murukku is sold not only in all parts of Tamil Nadu but also exported to other states of India and overseas. Around 150 to 250 families and cottage industries and at least 10 companies make the snack. In 2010, the Tamil Nadu government applied for a geographical indication (GI) tag for Manapparai Murukku, which was later approved in 2023. The GI tag is claimed to help more than 400 families who depend on this work.

== See also ==
- Tamil cuisine
