= List of metropolitan areas in Tamil Nadu =

This is a list of metropolitan areas by population in the Indian state of Tamil Nadu. As per the Constitution of India, a metropolitan area is defined as an area having a population of 10 lakh or more, comprised in one or more districts, and consisting of two or more municipalities or panchayats or other contiguous areas, specified by the Governor by a public notification. Chennai is the capital and the largest metropolitan area in Tamil Nadu.

Metropolitan areas in Tamil Nadu

== List ==
The list is updated for cities wherever metropolitan area data is available with the corresponding sources. All population data correspond to the 2011 census. For regions that were expanded post-2011 and no updated population data is available, data corresponding to the old urban area limits as per the 2011 census has been considered.

| Name | District | Area (km²) | Population |
|---|---|---|---|
| Chennai | Chennai, Chengalpattu, Thiruvallur, Kanchipuram and Ranipet | 5,904.00 | 8,696,010 |
| Coimbatore | Coimbatore | 1,531.57 | 2,467,000 |
| Salem | Salem | 1,265.20 | 2,290,024 |
| Madurai | Madurai | 1,254.93 | 2,263,115 |
| Tiruchirappalli | Tiruchirappalli | 804.53 | 1,433,167 |
| Tiruppur | Tiruppur | 1,031.67 | 1,359,814 |
| Erode | Erode | 731 | 889,334 |
| Tirunelveli | Tirunelveli | 861.03 | 8,33,631 |
| Nagercoil | Kanyakumari | 438.86 | 8,04,995 |
| Vellore | Vellore | 314.07 | 659,742 |
| Hosur | Krishnagiri | 1,071.79 | 501,609 |

== See also ==
- List of urban agglomerations in Tamil Nadu
