= Amayapuram =

- village
- Location in Tamil Nadu, India Amayapuram (India)
- Coordinates: 10°37′9″N 78°20′59″E
- Country: India
- State: Tamil Nadu
- District: Tiruchirapalli

Languages
  - Official: Tamil
- Time zone: UTC+5:30 (IST)
- Vehicle registration: TN-
- Coastline: 0 kilometres (0 mi)

Amayapuram is a village located near Manapparai, in Tamil Nadu, India.

== Climate ==
The villages in Tamil Nadu are heavily dependent on monsoon rains, and thereby are prone to droughts when the monsoons fail. The climate of the state ranges from dry sub-humid to semi-arid. The state has three distinct periods of rainfall:

- advancing monsoon period, South West monsoon from June to September, with strong southwest winds;
- North East monsoon from October to December, with dominant northeast winds;
- dry season from January to May.

The normal annual rainfall of the state is about 945 mm (37.2 in) of which 48% is through the North East monsoon, and 32% through the South West monsoon. Since the state is entirely dependent on rains for recharging its water resources, monsoon failures lead to acute water scarcity and severe drought.
