= Marungapuri taluk =

Coordinates: 10°26′51.01″N 78°26′7.45″E

Marungapuri Taluk is a taluk of Tiruchirappalli district in the Indian state of Tamil Nadu. It was split from Manapparai taluk in 2013. It hosts a population of about 1.41 lakh in an area of about 445 square kilometres (172 sq mi). Marungapuri taluk has Marungapuri, Thuvarankurichi and Valanadu firkas as its jurisdictional areas. Ponnampatti town panchayat also takes place. The Taluk Office is at M.Kallupatti, three km from Marungapuri.

== See also ==
- Marungapuri block
