= PSNA College of Engineering and Technology =

College in Tamil Nadu, India

Pacheri Sri Nallathangal Amman (PSNA) College of Engineering & Technology
- பச்சேரி நல்லதங்காள் அம்மன் பொறியியல் கல்லூரி
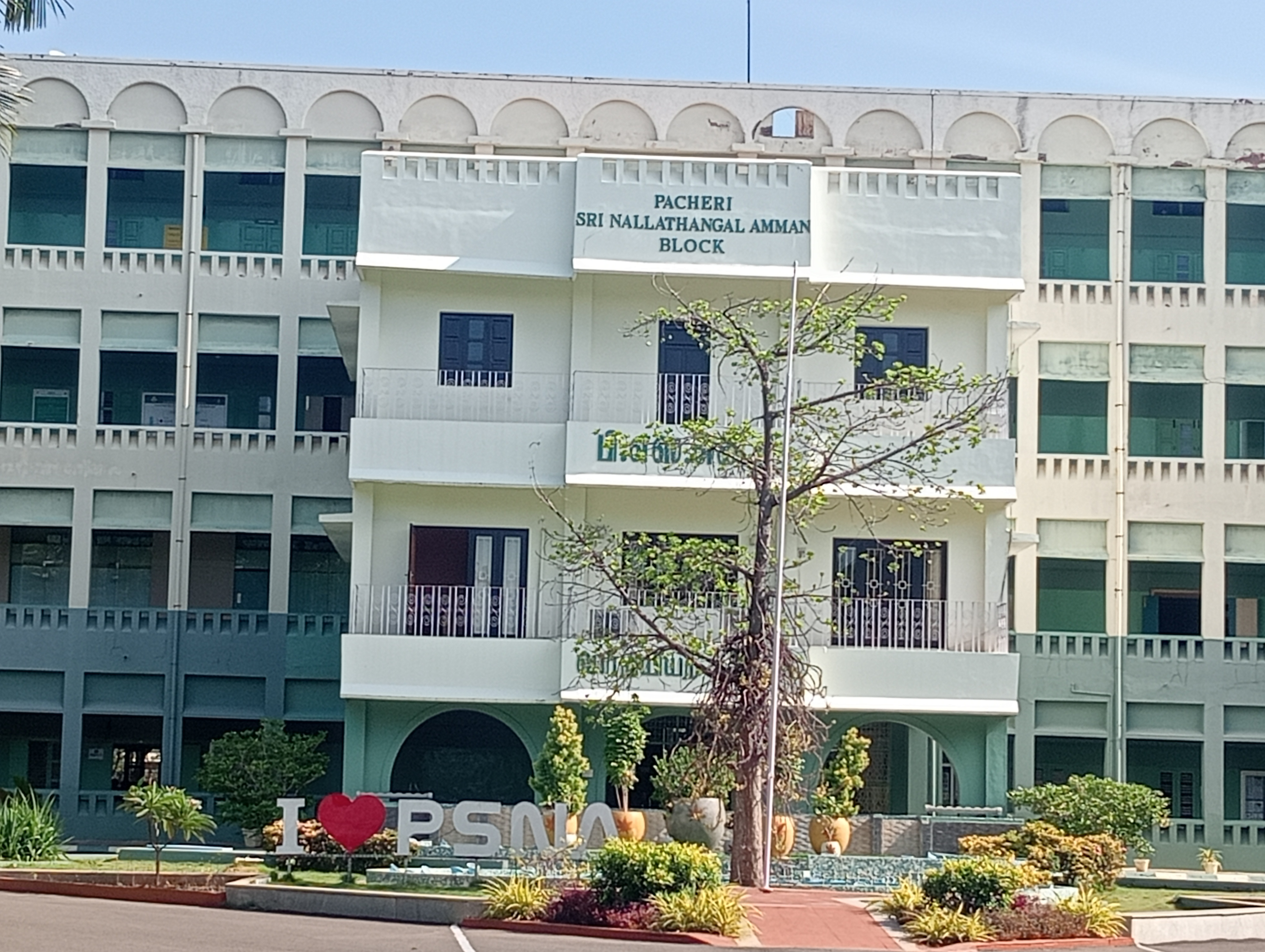
- Motto: Trust in God
- Type: Private self-financed
- Established: 1984
- Founder: 'Kalvi Thanthai' Thiru. R.S. Kothandaraman
- Accreditation: NBA, NAAC
- Affiliations: Anna University, Chennai
- Faculty: 405
- Students: 6500
- Location: Kothandaraman Nagar, NH 83, Dindigul, Tamil Nadu, India; 10.416541°N 77.900532°E
- Campus: Rural
- Website: psnacet.edu.in

PSNA College of Engineering & Technology (PSNA CET) is an Autonomous Engineering College situated in Kothandaraman Nagar, Dindigul, in the Indian state of Tamil Nadu. It is affiliated to Anna University and approved by the All India Council for Technical Education of New Delhi. It is accredited with the rating of A++ by NAAC with CGPA of 3.65.

== History ==
The College was founded in 1984 by the late Thiru R.S. Kothandaraman. The college functions under the aegis of Sri Rangalatchumi Educational Trust and is approved by the All India Council for Technical Education.

== Location ==
The campus is situated near the village Muthanampatti, about 13 kilometres (8.1 mi) from Dindigul, along the National Highway, NH 83 towards Palani. It is spread over 45 hectares.

== Programmes offered ==
=== U.G. degree programmes ===
- Mechanical Engineering
- Information Technology
- Civil Engineering
- Computer science and Engineering
- Electronics & Communication Engineering
- Electrical & Electronics Engineering
- Bio-Medical Engineering
- Artificial intelligence and data science
- Computer science and business system
- Computer science and Engineering(cyber security)
- Computer science and Engineering(AI and ML)

=== B.E. and prince. (3 years) ===
- Diploma Holders can join directly in the second year

=== P.G. degree programmes ===
- M.E. Computer Science & Engineering (2 years)
- M.E. Power Electronics & Drives (2 years)
- M.E. Computer & Communication (2 years)
- M.E. Applied Electronics (2 years)
- M.E. (VLSI Design) (2 years)
- M.E. Structural Engineering (2 years)
- M.E. Engineering Design (2 years)
- M.B.A. (2 years)
- M.C.A. (3 years)

Following programs are accredited by NAC, AICTE.

- Mechanical Engineering (UG)
- Electronics & Communication Engineering (UG)
- Electrical & Electronics Engineering (UG)
- Computer science and Engineering (UG)
- Civil Engineering (UG)
- M.B.A (PG)

== Awards ==
PSNA received the Bharatiya Vidya Bhavan - National Award (2007) from the Indian Society for Technical Education (ISTE) for best overall performance. This is jointly awarded to this college and P.S.G. College of Technology Coimbatore.

== Rankings ==
University rankings

Engineering – India
- NIRF (2024): 201-300

The National Institutional Ranking Framework (NIRF) ranked the college between 201-300 in the engineering rankings in 2024.
