= Marungapuri block =

Marungapuri block and Marungapuri Taluk is a revenue block and taluk in the Tiruchirappalli district of Tamil Nadu, India. It has a total of 49 panchayat villages. Marungapuri taluk's jurisdictional areas include Marungapuri, Thuvarankurichi and Valanadu firkas. The taluk office is functioning temporarily at T. Kallupatti, about three kilometers away from Marungapuri, on the Tiruchi-Madurai National Highway. Marungapuri taluk has a population of about 1.41 lakh in an area of about 445 square km and the Manapparai taluk has about 2.63 lakh in 544.36 square km. The taluk falls under the jurisdiction of Srirangam Revenue Divisional Office (RDO).

== See also ==
- Marungapuri taluk
