= Urban agglomerations in Tamil Nadu =

An urban agglomeration is defined as "a continuous urban spread constituting a town and its adjoining outgrowths, or two or more physically contiguous towns together with or without outgrowths of such towns". An urban agglomeration must consist of at least a statutory town and its total population (i.e. all the constituents put together) should not be less than 20,000.

Cities in bold are administered as Municipal corporations.

Ten largest urban agglomerations in Tamil Nadu

Urban agglomerations in Tamil Nadu
Rank	City	District	Population (2011)
1	**Chennai**	Chennai	8,696,010
2	**Coimbatore**	Coimbatore	2,151,466
3	**Madurai**	Madurai	1,462,420
4	**Tiruchirappalli**	Tiruchirappalli	1,021,717
5	**Tiruppur**	Tiruppur	962,982
6	**Salem**	Salem	919,950
7	**Erode**	Erode	521,776
8	**Tirunelveli**	Tirunelveli	498,924
9	**Vellore**	Vellore	481,966
10	**Thoothukudi**	Thoothukudi	410,760
11	**Dindigul**	Dindigul	292,132
12	**Thanjavur**	Thanjavur	290,724
13	Ranipet	Ranipet	262,346
14	**Sivakasi**	Virudhunagar	234,688
15	**Karur**	Karur	233,763
16	Udhagamandalam	Nilgiris	233,374
17	**Hosur**	Krishnagiri	229,507
18	**Nagercoil**	Kanyakumari	224,849
19	**Kancheepuram**	Kancheepuram	221,749
20	Komarapalayam	Namakkal	194,992
21	**Karaikudi**	Sivaganga	181,347
22	Neyveli	Cuddalore	178,925
23	**Cuddalore**	Cuddalore	173,361
24	**Kumbakonam**	Thanjavur	167,098
25	**Tiruvannamalai**	Tiruvannamalai	144,683
26	Pollachi	Coimbatore	135,235
27	Rajapalayam	Virudhunagar	130,119
28	Gudiyatham	Vellore	124,274
29	**Pudukottai**	Pudukottai	117,215
30	Vaniyambadi	Tirupattur	116,712
31	Ambur	Tirupattur	113,856
32	Nagapattinam	Nagapattinam	102,838

== See also ==
- List of most populous metropolitan areas in India
- List of cities in Tamil Nadu by population
- List of million-plus urban agglomerations in India
