= Manapparai =

Manapparai / Manaparai
- Town
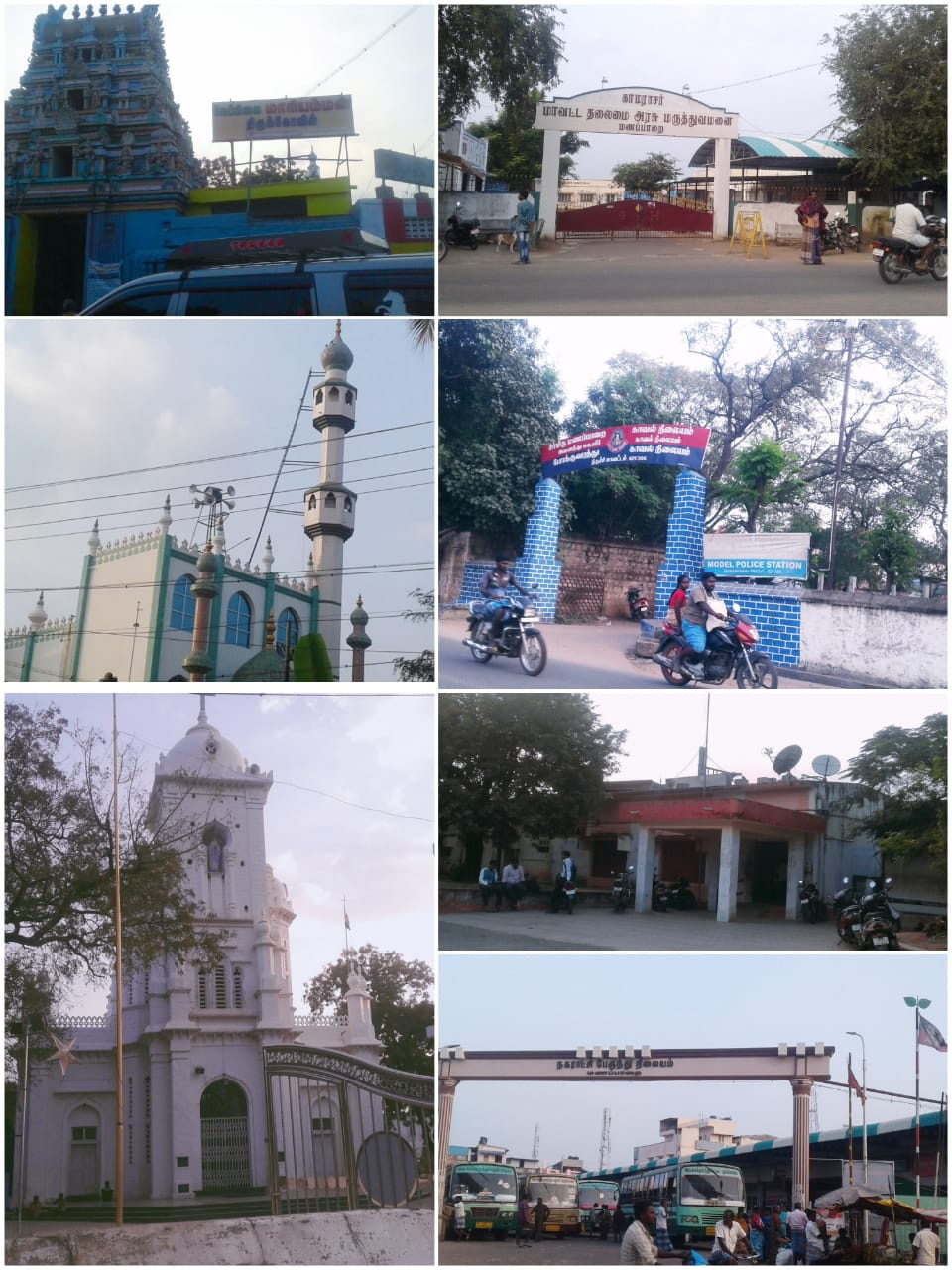
- Clockwise from Top left : Arulmigu Mariyamman Temple, Government District Headquarters Hospital, Model Police Station, Manaparai Railway Station, Municipal Bus Stand, Our lady of Lourdes Church, Big Mosque
- Nickname: Manavai
- Manapparai, Tamil Nadu Manapparai / Manaparai (India)
- Coordinates: 10.608900°N 78.423300°E
- Country: India
- State: Tamil Nadu
- District: Tiruchirappalli
- Region: Chola Nadu
- Named for: Murukku, Cattle market

Government
  - Type: First Grade Municipality
  - Body: Manapparai Municipality
  - Chairman: Geetha. A. Michaelraj

Area
  - Total: 20.85 km^{2} (8.05 sq mi)
  - Rank: A Grade
- Elevation: 183 m (600 ft)

Population (2011)
  - Total: 40,510
  - Density: 1,943/km^{2} (5,032/sq mi)

Languages
  - Official: Tamil
- Time zone: UTC+5:30 (IST)
- PIN: 621306
- Telephone code: 914332
- Vehicle registration: TN 45Z ****
- Website: www.tnurbantree.tn.gov.in/manapparai/

Manapparai (Tamil: [manappaːɾaɪ]) is a Municipality and Taluk in Tiruchirappalli district in the Indian state of Tamil Nadu. Manapparai Town is located 38 km from Trichy. Manapparai is the headquarters of the Manapparai Taluk. Manapparai is famous for murukku (deep-fried snacks) and cattle market. As of 2011, the town had a population of 40,510.

== Demographics ==
Religious census
Religion	Percent(%)
Hindu	65.67%
Muslim	11.3%
Christian	22.95%
Sikh	0.01%
Buddhist	0.01%
Jain	0.0%
Other	0.06%
No religion	0.0%

According to the 2011 census, Manapparai had a population of 370,482 with a sex-ratio of 1,012 females for every 1,000 males, much above the national average of 929. A total of 4,090 people were under the age of six, constituting 2,096 males and 1,994 females. Scheduled Castes and Scheduled Tribes accounted for 11.97% and 0.18% of the population respectively. The average literacy of the town was 78.98%, compared to the national average of 72.99%. The town had a total of 9,934 households. There were a total of 14,930 workers, comprising 455 cultivators, 749 main agricultural labourers, 582 in house hold industries, 11,518 other workers, 1,626 marginal workers, 29 marginal cultivators, 470 marginal agricultural labourers, 51 marginal workers in household industries and 1,076 other marginal workers. As per the religious census of 2011, Manapparai (M) had 65.67% Hindus, 11.3% Muslims, 22.95% Christians, 0.01% Sikhs, 0.01% Buddhists, 0.0% Jains, 0.06% following other religions and 0.0% following no religion or did not indicate any religious preference.

== Politics ==
Manaparai is the headquarters of Manaparai Legislative Assembly Constituency, which is part of the Karur Loksabha Constituency. Abdul Samad is the present Member of legislative assembly (MLA) representing Manaparai Constituency and Ms. Jothimani Sennimalai is the present Member of Parliament (MP) representing Karur constituency.

Manapparai Municipality is the local body that governs the town of Manapparai. The Municipality is divided into 27 wards. Municipal Chairman is the head of the local body. The current Municipal Chairman is Geetha. A. Michaelraj.

== Municipal finances ==
According to data published on the CityFinance portal of the Ministry of Housing and Urban Affairs (MoHUA), Government of India, Manapparai Municipality reported a total revenue of ₹13 crore and total expenditure of ₹15 crore for the fiscal year 2021–22. The municipality’s own revenue stood at ₹7 crore, including ₹2 crore from tax revenue and ₹6 crore in grants. Its total balance sheet size was ₹85 crore.

The municipality is classified under the below 100,000 population category, with 27 wards and a population of 40,510 spread across 20.85 km².

== Notable festivals ==
Every year in the Tamil month of Chithirai, The Chithirai festival of Arulmigu Veppilai Marriamman Temple is celebrated over a month long period. Approximately, several Thousands of devotees from various parts of south India attends the festival.

== Transport ==
Manapparai lies between Trichy and Dindigul in NH 83 (old NH 45) . The town is connected to Musiri and Pudukkottai via SH 71. SH 71-A connects Manapparai with Thuvarankurichi (and Madurai).

=== Bus transportation ===
About 300 buses pass through the municipal bus stand, which is a ‘C’-class facility constructed in 1981. The bus stand was renovated and expanded in 2017.

Manapparai is well connected to Trichy, DIndigul, Palani, Theni, Kambam, Kumily with frequent bus services. It is also connected to other towns across Tamil Nadu through bus facilities.

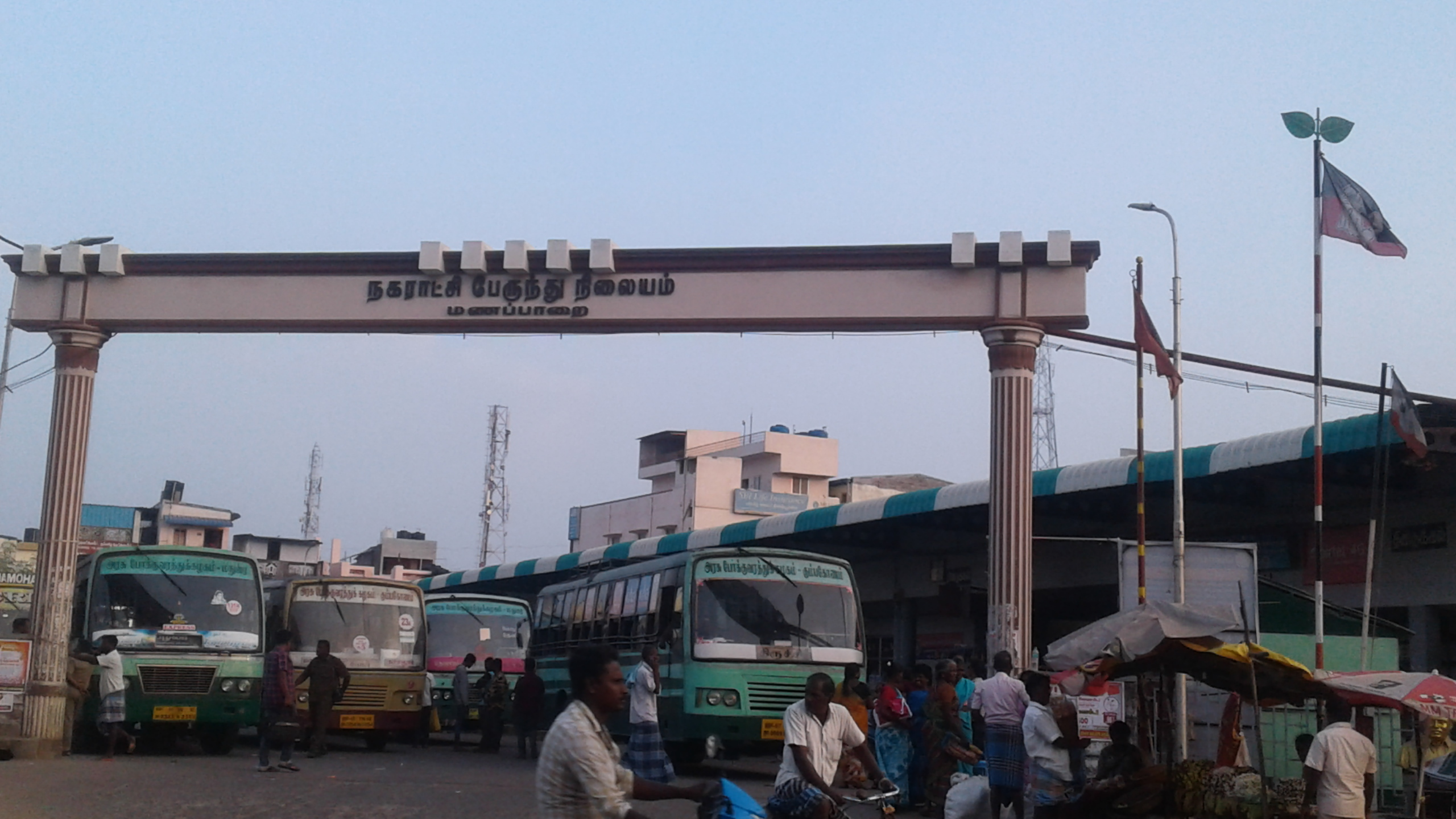
Manapparai Bus Stand

=== Rail transportation ===
Manapparai Railway station ( Station code : MPA ) is situated on Trichy - Dindigul Double electric broad gauge line.

== Education ==
Manapparai has about 23 schools, of which 6 are government run, and an Engineering college within the municipality limits. Manapparai Government Arts and Science College is located at Pannankombu, 10 km away from the town.

== Religious places ==
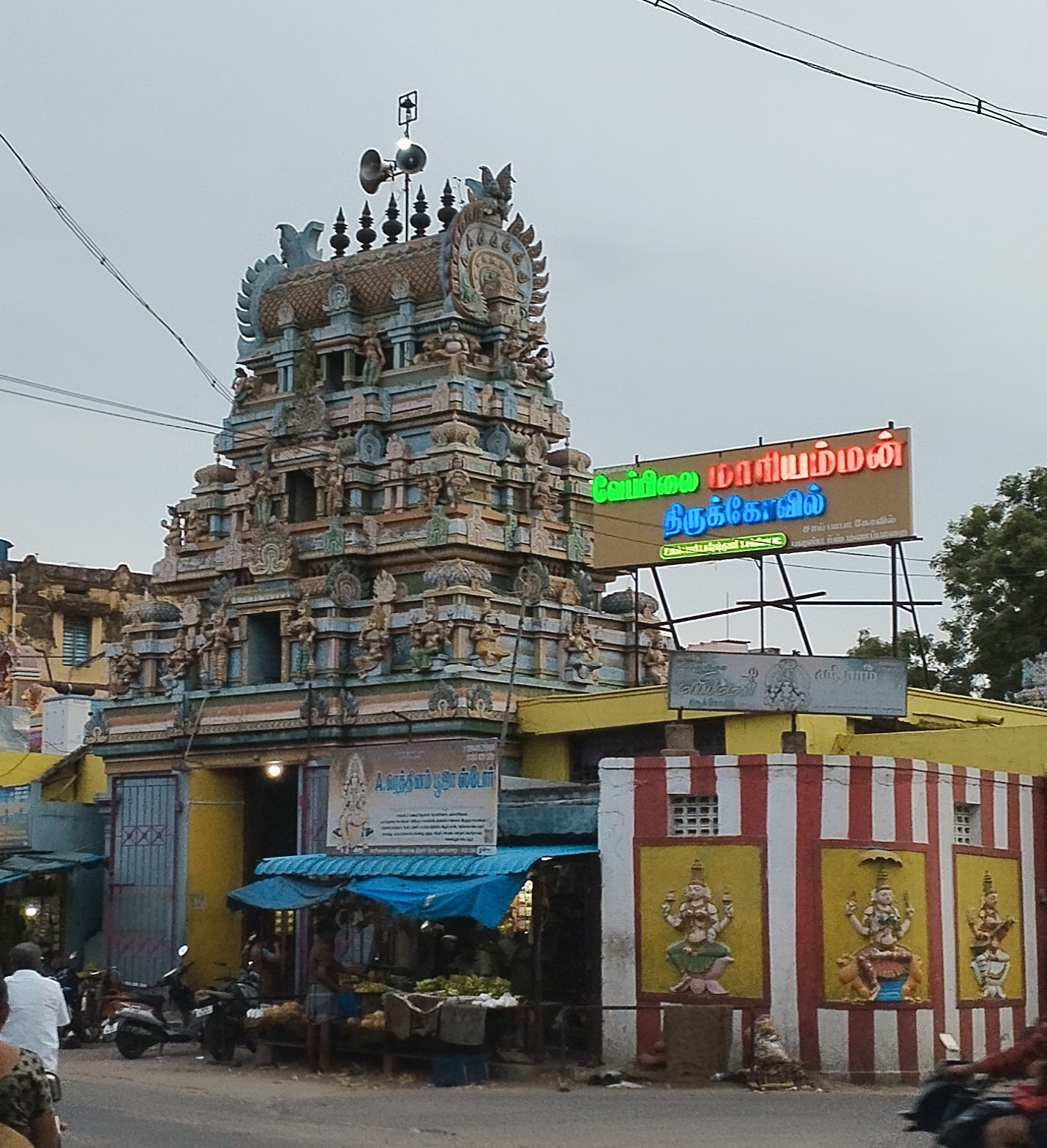
Vepillai Mariyamman temple

- Arulmigu Veppilai Mariyamman Temple
- Our Lady of Lourdes church
- Valanadu Ponnar Shankar Temple
- Veerapur Ponnar Shankar Temple
- Big Mosque
- Arulmigu Nallandavar Temple
- Arulmigu Agasteeswarar temple

== Adjacent communities ==
- Amayapuram
- Veerapur
- Inam Kulathur
- Viralimalai
- Vaiyampatti
- Moovar Kovil

== See also ==
- Manapparai Murukku
