= Dindigul =

Dindigul ( Dindimaanagaram )
- City
- Holland of Tamil Nadu; Lock City
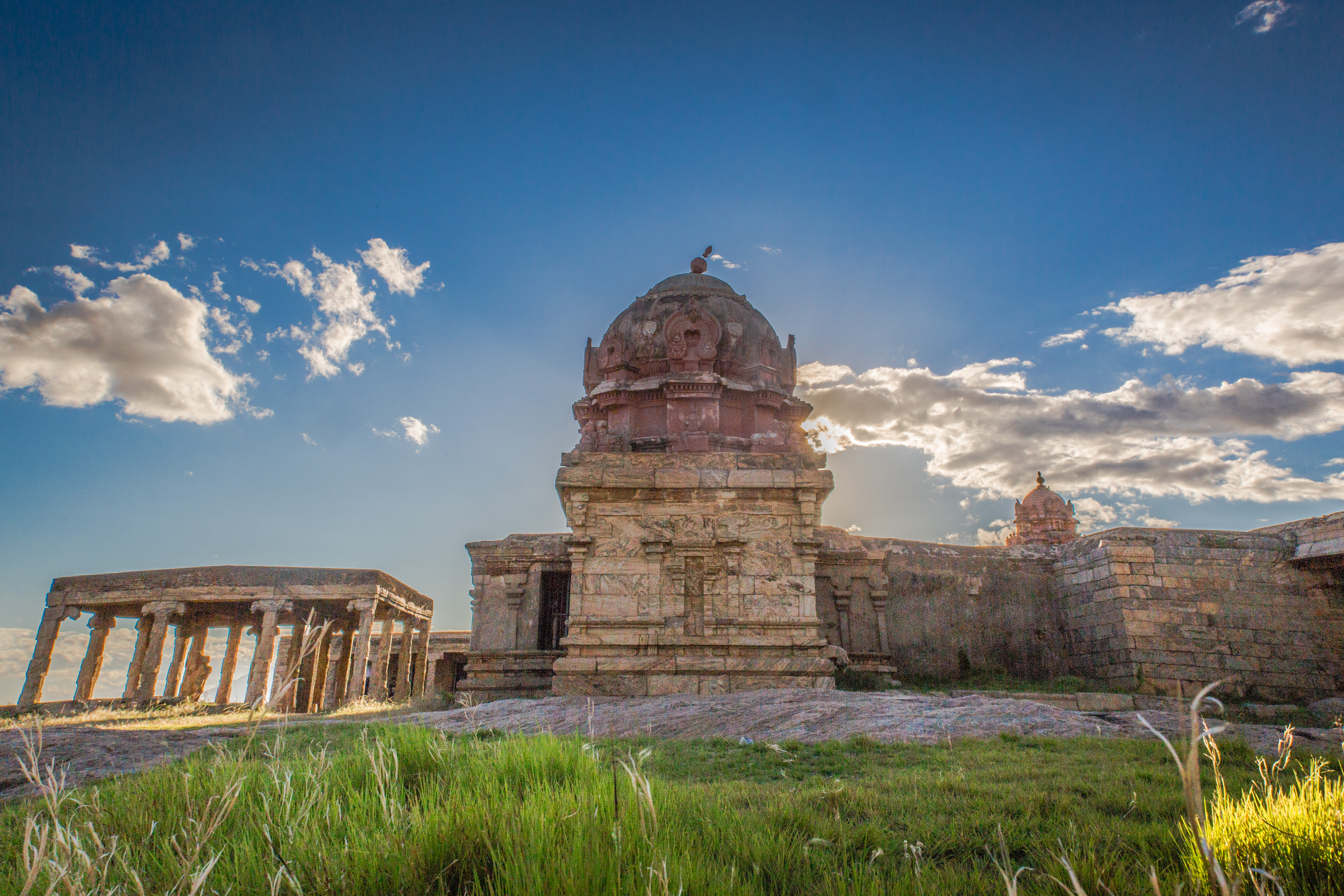
- Temple at top of Dindigul Fort
- Nicknames: Holland of Tamil Nadu, City of Locks; City of Biryani, City of Flowers
- Location in Tamil Nadu, India
- Coordinates: 10.35°N 77.95°E
- Country: India
- State: Tamil Nadu
- District: Dindigul
- Region: Pandya Nadu
- Established: 300 BCE - 300 AD
- Named for: Dindigul Fort

Government
  - Type: City Corporation
  - Body: Dindigul City Municipal Corporation
  - Collector: Thiru S.SARAVANAN, IAS.,
  - Commissioner of City Corporation: Thiru. S. Sivasubramanian, B.Sc, BL.,
  - Mayor: Tmt. J. Ilamathi
  - Deputy Mayor: Thiru. S. Rajappa

Area
  - City: 46.9 km^{2} (18.1 sq mi)
- Elevation: 268 m (879 ft)

Population (2011)
  - City: 207,327
  - Rank: 15th in Tamil Nadu
  - Density: 4,420/km^{2} (11,400/sq mi)
  - Metro: 292,512
  - Metro rank: 11th in Tamil Nadu
- Demonym: Dindigultie

Languages
  - Official: Tamil; English
- Time zone: UTC+05:30 (IST)
- PIN: 624001
- Telephone code: +91-451
- Vehicle registration: TN-57
- Website: Dindigul Municipal Corporation

Dindigul (Tamil ISO: Tiṇṭukkal, IPA: [t̪iɳɖukːɐl]) is a city in the Indian state of Tamil Nadu. It is the administrative headquarters of the Dindigul district. Dindigul City is Located in the Southwest Region of Tamil Nadu. Dindigul is an ancient settlement region and has been ruled at different times by the Cheras, Early Pandyas, Cholas, Pallava dynasty, later Pandyas, Madurai Sultanate, Vijayanagara Empire, Madurai Nayak Dynasty, Kingdom of Mysore, Chanda Sahib, and British. It is the 11th-largest Urban Agglomeration in the state. Dindigul has a number of historical monuments, the Dindigul Fort being the most prominent. Dindigul is located 420 km (260 mi) southwest from the state capital, Chennai, 100 km (62 mi) away from Tiruchirappalli,66 km (41 mi) away from Madurai and 162 km (101 mi) away from Coimbatore. The city is known for its Famous Locks and its Authentic Biriyani.

The Dindigul Municipality has been upgraded as City Corporation with effect from 19 February 2014. Hon'ble Chief Minister Jayalalithaa handed over the government order to Municipal Chairman V. Marudharaj.

Industries in Dindigul include safety lock makers, leather tanneries, textile spinning, administrative services, agricultural trading, banking, agricultural machinery and educational services. Dindigul is upgraded to a municipal corporation. The city covers an area of 14.01 km^{2} (5.41 sq mi) and had a population of 207,327 in 2011. Dindigul is well-connected by road and rail with the rest of Tamil Nadu. it had a population of 292,512 according to Tamil Nadu's 2011 census. Dindigul has 200,000 hectares of cultivation land, and agriculture continues to be the main occupation of its inhabitants. Located between the Palani and Sirumalai Hills, Dindigul has a reserved forest area of 85 hectares.

It is one of the few towns and cities in List of AMRUT Smart cities in Tamil Nadu selected for AMRUT Schemes from central government and the developmental activities are taken care by government of Tamil Nadu.

== Etymology ==
The Śaiva poet Tirunāvukkarasar visited the city and noted it in his Tevaram. Dindigul was mentioned in poet Palupatai sokkanathar's book Padmagiri Nadhar Thenral Vidu thudhu. This was later stated by U. V. Swaminatha Iyer (1855-1942) in his foreword to the above book. He also mentions that Dindigul was originally called Thindicharam.

In popular culture, the city's name comes from a portmanteau of the Tamil words Thindu "pillow" and Kal "rock" and refers to the bare hill located in the city.

== History ==
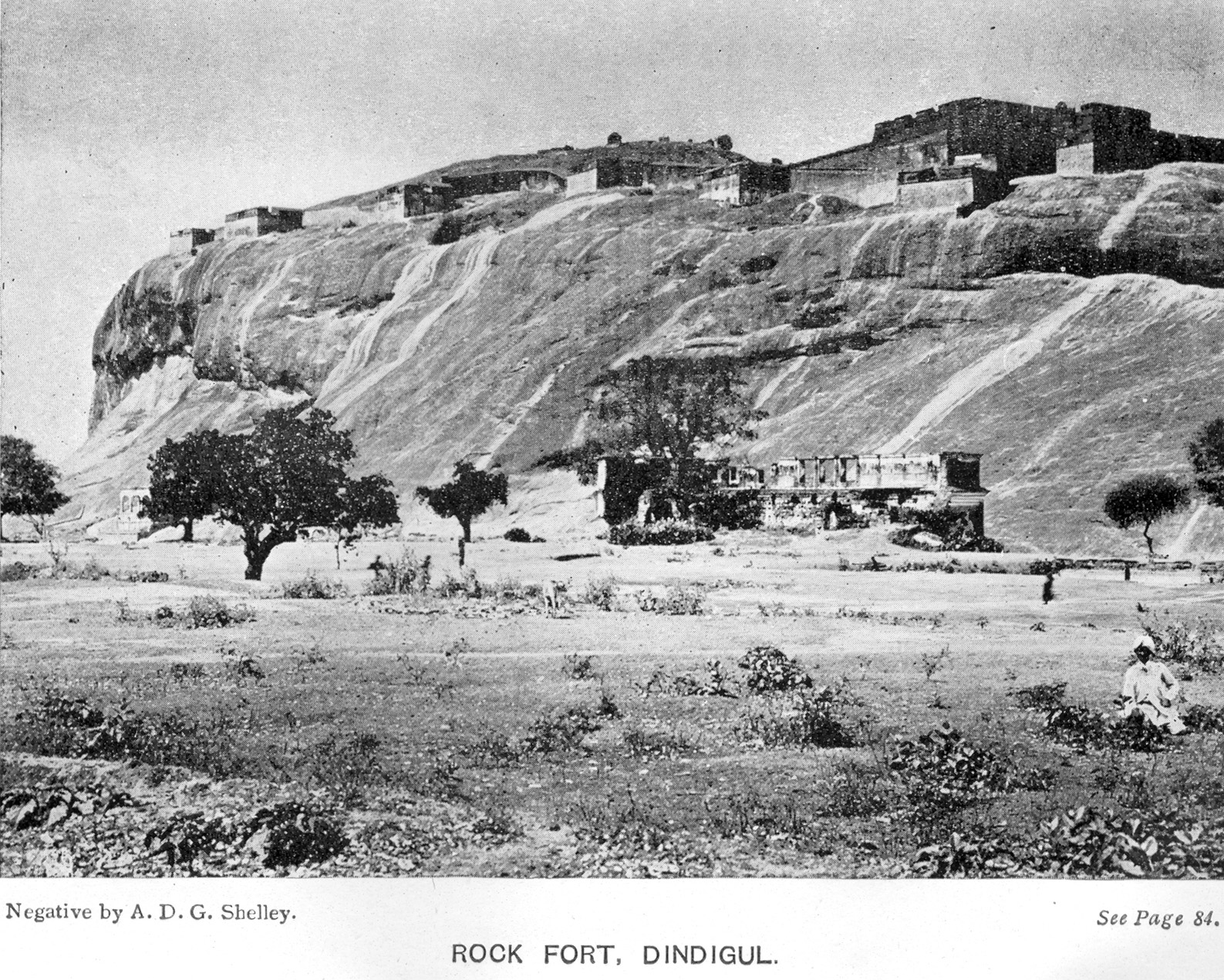
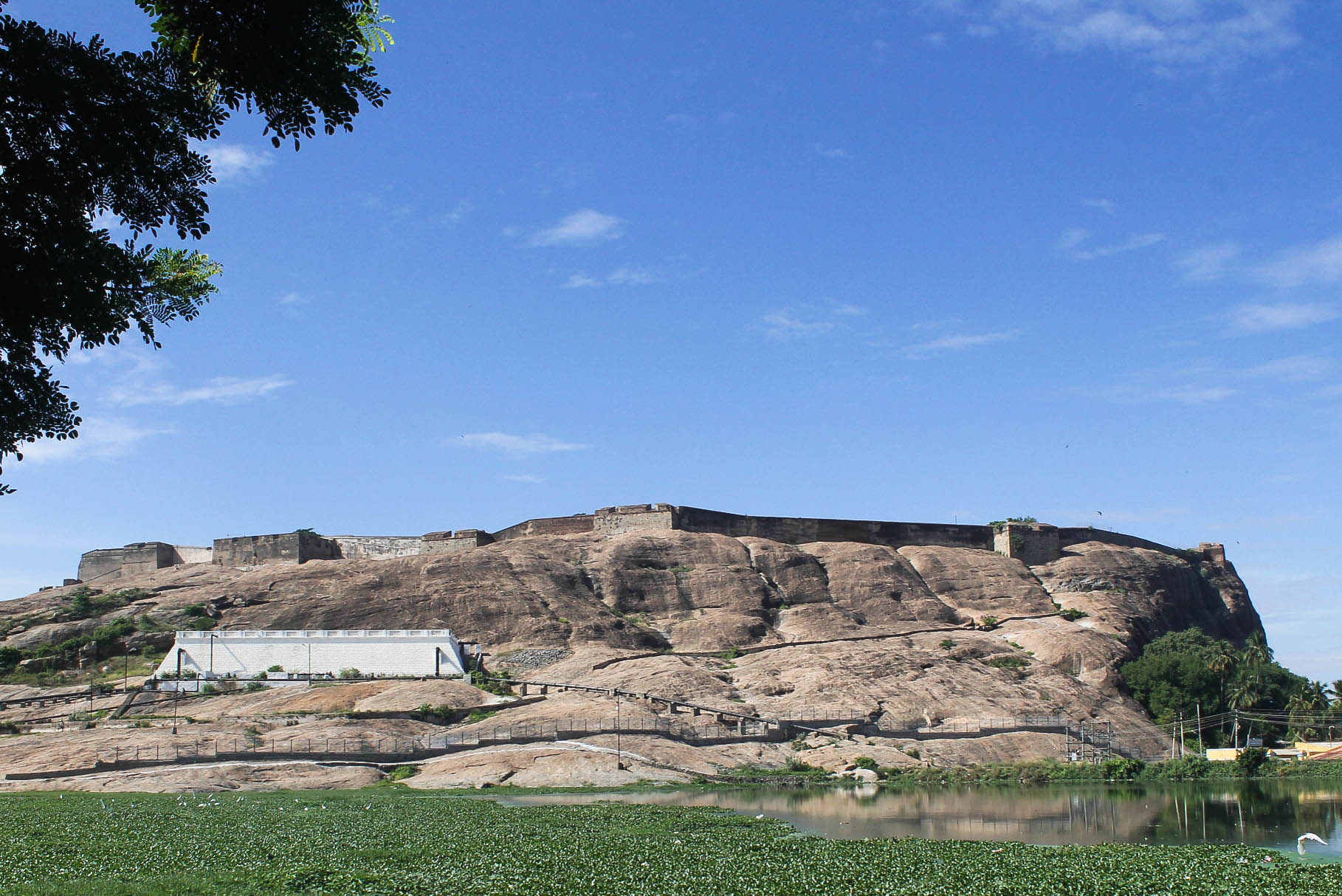
Images of the temple in 1913 and in modern times

The history of Dindigul is centered around the Dindigul Fort, located on a small rock hill near the city. Dindigul was on the border of the moovendars of ancient Tamilakam, the Pandyas, Cheras and Cholas. The Chera king Dharmabalan is believed to have built the temples of Abirami and Padmagirinathar. The ancient Tamil book, Silappathikaram records the city as the northern border of the Pandya kingdom whose capital was Madurai. Historian Strabo mentions about the city in his 20 A.D. work and Pliny, the great historian of the time described the Pandya king in his works.

During the 1st century CE, the Chola king Karikal Cholan captured the Pandya kingdom and Dindigul came under Chola rule. During the sixth century, the Pallavas took over Dindigul along with most of southern India, and was ruled by them until 8th century CE when the Cholas retook it. During the Delhi Sultanate's raids into southern India, Dindigul was not attacked, and later that century the city became part of the Vijayanagara Empire. The commander of the Vijayanagara army Kampanna Udayar played an important role in the war in capturing Madurai which was under the Madurai Sultanate. In 1559 Nayaks became powerful and their territory bordered with Dindigul in the north. After the death of king Viswanatha Nayak in 1563, Muthukrisna Nayakka became the king of a kingdom in 1602 A.D who built the strong hill fort in 1605 A.D. He also built a fort at the bottom of the hill. Muthuveerappa Nayak and Thirumalai Nayak followed Muthukrishna Nayak. Dindigul came to prominence once again during Nayaks rule of Madurai under Thirumalai Nayak. After his immediate unsuccessful successors, Rani Mangammal became the ruler of the region who ruled efficiently.

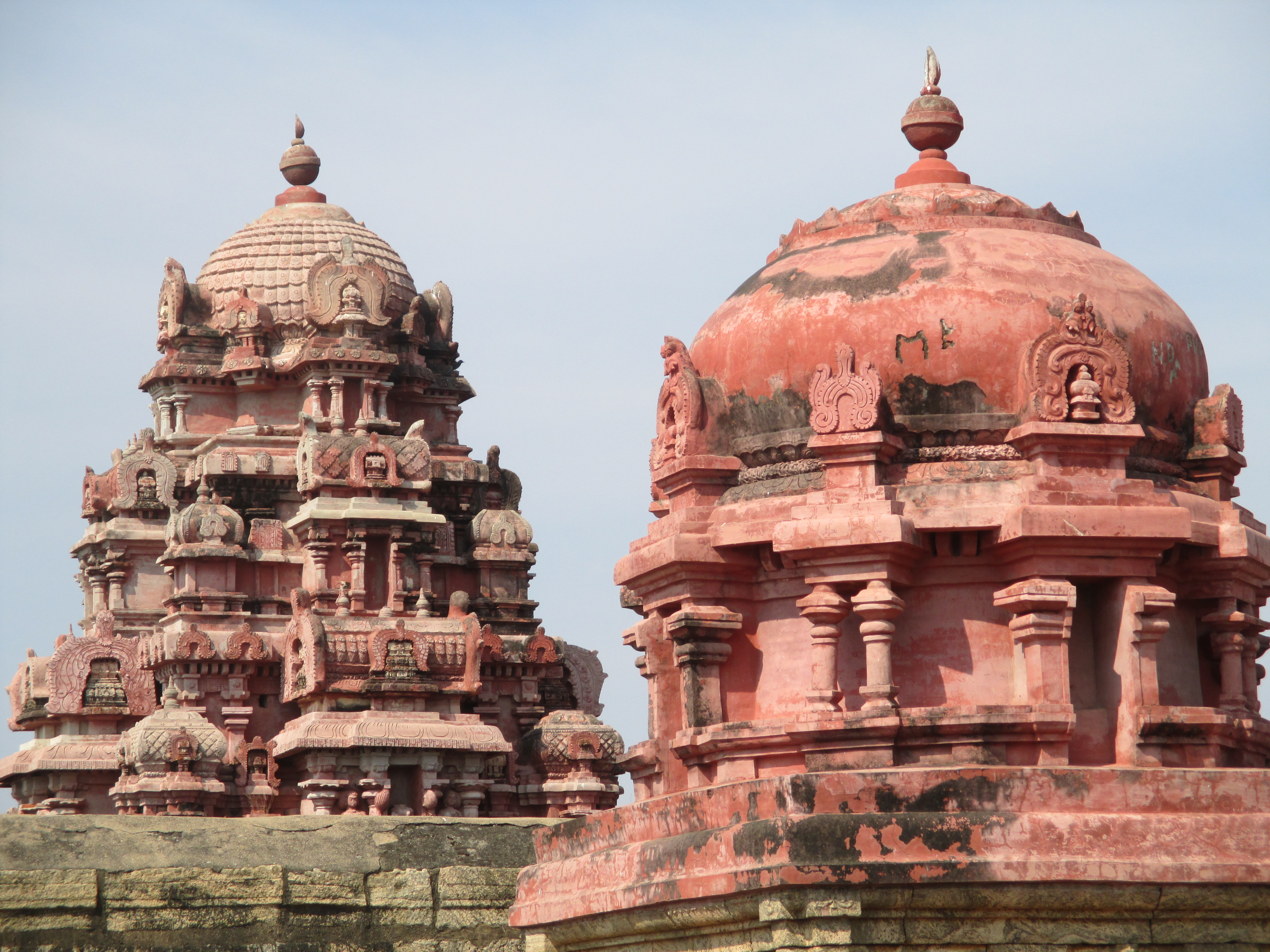
Image of temple in the fort

In 1736 Chanda Sahib, the Nawab of Carnatic Sultanate and lieutenant of Mughal Empire seized power from Vangaru Nayak. In 1742, the Mysore army under the leadership of Venkatarayar conquered Dindigul. He governed Dindigul as a representative of Maharaja of Mysore. There were 18 palayams (a small region consists of few villages) during his reign and all these palayams were under Dindigul Seemai (District), with Dindigul as the capital. These palayams wanted to be independent and refused to pay taxes to Venkatarayar. In 1748, Venkatappa was made governor of the region in place of Venkatarayar, who also failed. In 1755, the Maharaja sent Haider Ali to Dindigul to handle the situation. Later Haider Ali became the Maharaja of Mysore, and in 1777, he appointed Purshana Mirsaheb as governor of Dindigul. Mirsaheb strengthened the fort and the garrison around it. His wife Ameer-um-Nisha-Begam died during her delivery and her tomb is now called Begambur. In 1783 the British Army, led by Captain Long, occupied Dindigul. In 1784, after an agreement between Mysore and the British army, Dindigul was restored by Mysore province. In 1788, Tipu Sultan, the Son of Haider Ali, was crowned as King of Dindigul. In 1790, James Stewart of the British army conquered Dindigul again during third war of Mysore. In a pact made on 1792, Tipu ceded Dindigul to the British. In 1798, the British army strengthened the hill fort with cannons and built sentinel rooms in every corner. The British army, under Statten stayed at Dindigul fort from 1798 to 1859. After that Madurai was made headquarters of the British army and Dindigul was attached to it as a taluk. Dindigul was under the rule of the British until India gained Independence on 15 August 1947. Recently the city has been experiencing new growth and new companies are opening branches here like Chennai Silks, UnlimitED, Jos Allukas and Tanishq.

== Geography ==
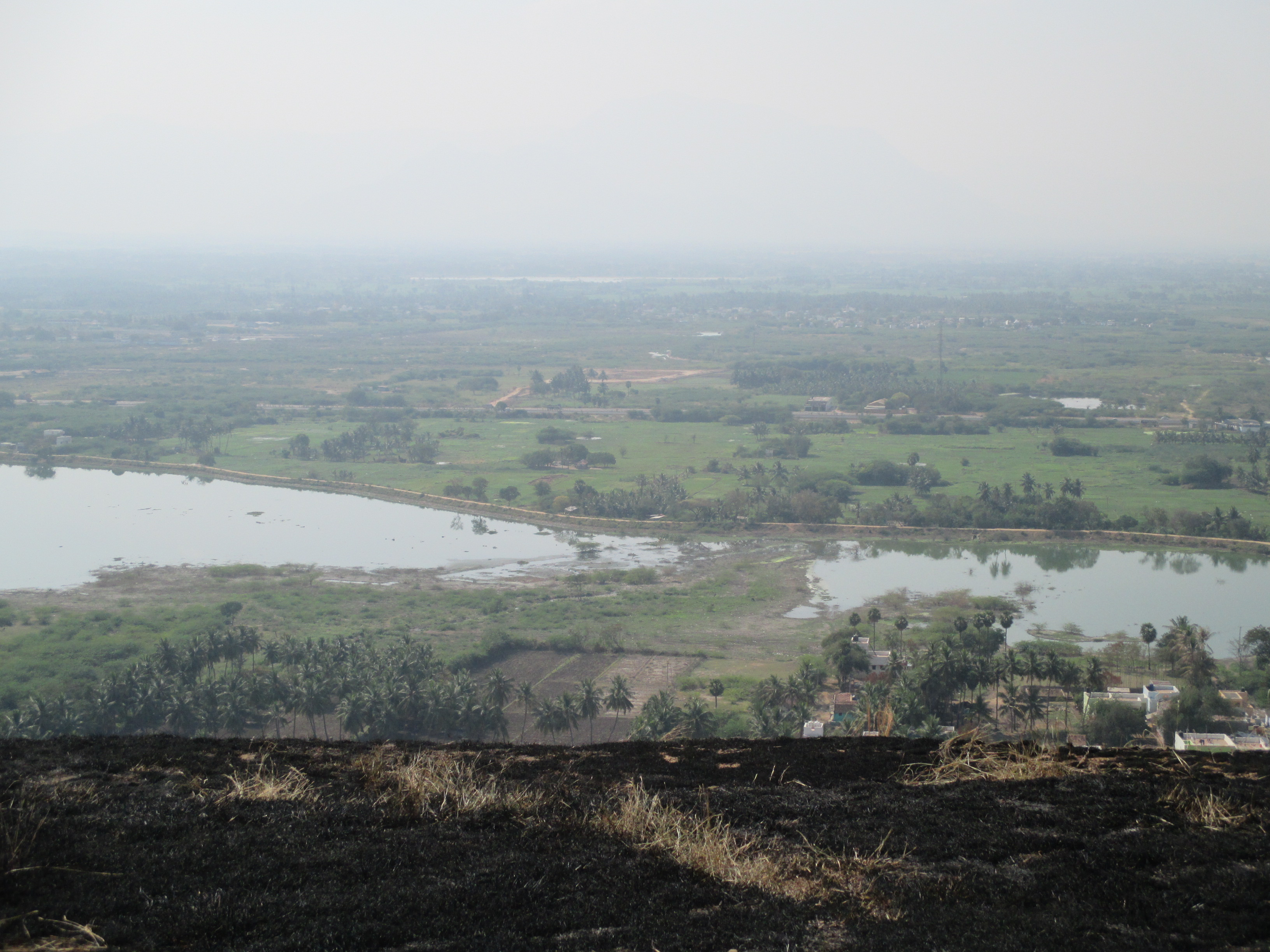
A view of a lake and paddy fields in Dindigul as viewed from Dindigul fort

Dindugul is located at 10.35°N 77.95°E and has an average elevation of 265 m (869 ft). The town is in Dindigul district, 420 km (260 mi) from Chennai and 100 km (62 mi) south-west of Tiruchirappalli. Dindigul is located in the foothills of Sirumalai hills. The topography is plain and hilly, with the variation resulting in climatic changes. There are no notable mineral resources available in and around the town. The soil type is thin veneer soil, which is mostly black clayey soil with red soil. Summer season is from March to July, while December to January marks the winter season. The temperature ranges from a maximum of 37 °C (99 °F) to a minimum of 27 °C (81 °F) during summer and a maximum of 26 °C (79 °F) to a minimum of 16 °C (61 °F) during winter. Dindigul receives rainfall with an average of 812 mm (32.0 in) annually. The Southwest monsoon, with an onset in June and lasting up to August, brings scanty rainfall. Bulk of the rainfall is received during the North East monsoon in the months of October, November and December.

The climatic conditions of Dindigul are favourable for horticulture and cultivation of different flower varieties. Apart from flowers, Dindigul is famous for producing fruits like orange, pineapple, guava, vegetables like onions, and other non-food crops like tobacco, eucalyptus, and coffee.

== Demographics ==
Religions in Dindigul
Religion	Percent(%)
Hindu	69.11%
Christian	16.59%
Muslim	14.17%
Sikh	0.02%
Buddhist	0.02%
Jain	0.01%
Other	0.1%

Historical population
Year	Pop.	±%
1901	25,182	—
1911	25,052	−0.5%
1921	30,922	+23.4%
1931	43,617	+41.1%
1941	56,275	+29.0%
1951	78,361	+39.2%
1961	92,947	+18.6%
1971	128,429	+38.2%
1981	164,103	+27.8%
1991	182,477	+11.2%
2001	196,619	+7.8%
2011	207,327	+5.4%
Sources: 1901 – 2001; 2011

According to 2011 census, Dindigul had a population of 207,327 with a sex-ratio of 1,012 females for every 1,000 males, much above the national average of 929. A total of 19,603 were under the age of six, constituting 10,126 males and 9,477 females. Scheduled Castes and Scheduled Tribes accounted for 7.58% and 0.07% of the population respectively. The average literacy of the city was 81.69%, compared to the national average of 72.99%. The city had a total of 53573 households. There were a total of 77,813 workers, comprising 387 cultivators, 366 main agricultural labourers, 5,328 in house hold industries, 68,163 other workers, 3,569 marginal workers, 46 marginal cultivators, 176 marginal agricultural labourers, 187 marginal workers in household industries and 3,160 other marginal workers. As per the religious census of 2011, Dindigul had 69.11% Hindus, 14.17% Muslims, 16.59% Christians, 0.02% Sikhs, 0.02% Buddhists, 0.01% Jains and 0.1% following other religions.

As of the provisional population totals of 2011 census, Dindigul urban agglomeration had a population of 292,132, with 145,438 males and 146,694 females. The sex ratio of the town was 1,009 females per 1,000 males; the child sex ratio stood at 964. Dindigul had an average literacy rate of 89.1% with a male literacy of 93.41% and a female literacy of 84.83%. A total of 26,169 of the population of the town was under 6 years of age.

As of 2001, 15 slums were identified in the town and a total of 85,235 people resided in the slums in 16,841 households. The slum population increased from 16 per cent to 43 per cent during the period of 1991–2001. The town experienced a growth rate of 28 per cent to 40 per cent during the 70s, but declined to 11 percent in 80s and 8 percent.

The city covers an area of 14.01 square kilometres (5.41 sq mi). The population density of the city in the 2001 census was 153 persons per hectare, compared with 2,218 persons per square kilometer in 1971. The density of population is higher in the central areas and along major roads. Hindus form the majority of the urban population, followed by Muslims and Christians. Tamil is the main language spoken in the city, but the use of English is relatively common; English is the medium of instruction in most educational institutions and offices in the service sector.

== Economy ==
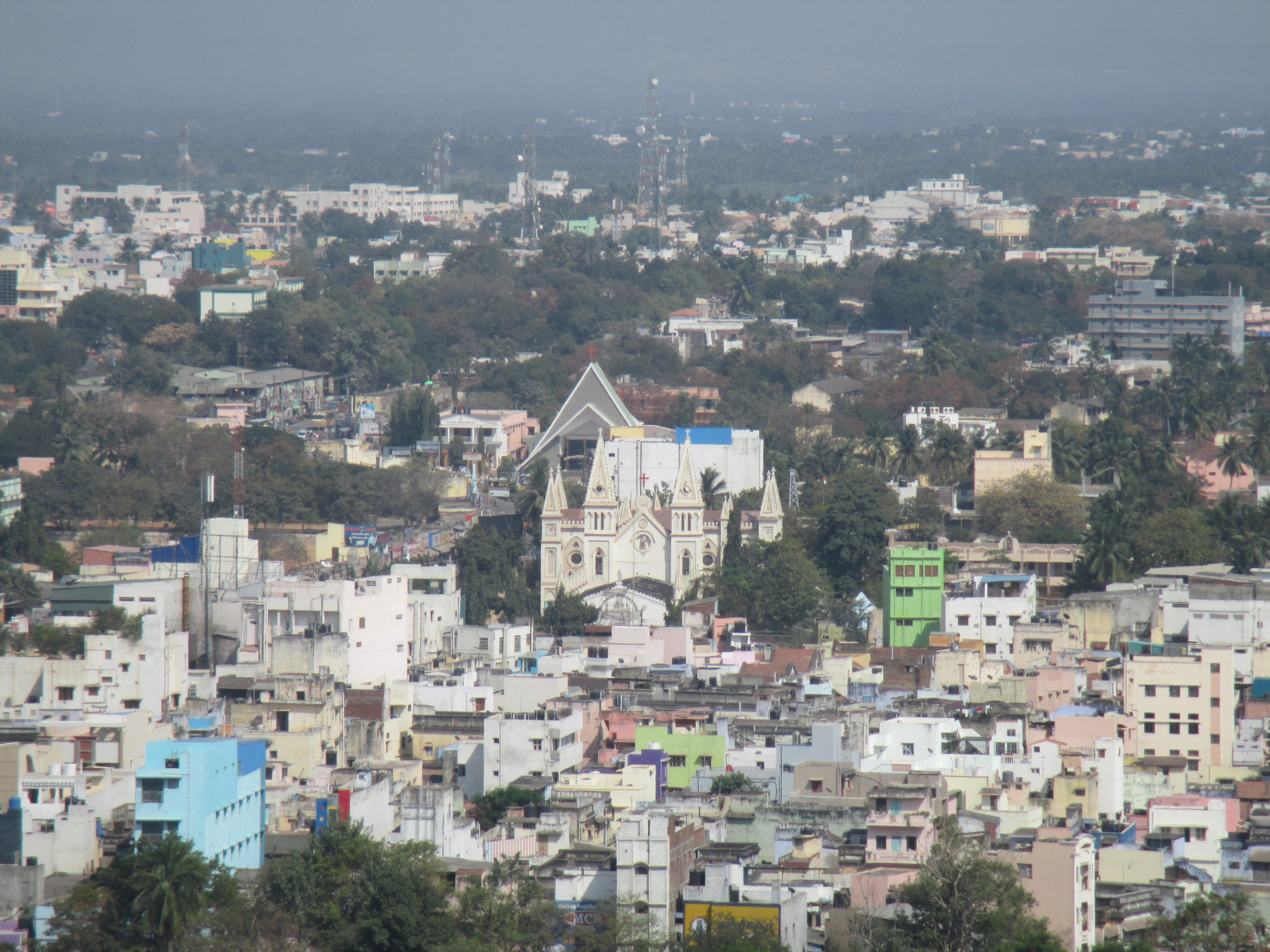
View of the city centre from Dindigul fort

According to Indian Census of 2001, Dindigul town's urban workforce participation rate is 35.24 percent. Dindigul, being the headquarters of the district, has registered growth in the secondary and tertiary sectors, with a corresponding decrease in the primary Sector. Major employment in the city is provided by industrial estates, hand loom, trading and commerce activities. Approximately 90 percent of the workforce is employed in the tertiary sector. The district at large has only two industrial estates, with one of them located in the city. Oddanchatram is one of the important towns in Dindigul district. Oddanchatram Vegetable market (also known as Gandhi market) is the largest vegetable market in Tamil Nadu. As of 2001, there were approximately 60 tanneries, 165 lock manufacturing units and large number of cotton spinning mills.

Locks and steel safes are manufactured in Dindigul and operated as a co-operative sector. Locks manufactured in Dindigul are sold in national and international markets and it is well known all over India for the quality of locks. Dindigul locks received geographical indication on 30 August 2019. A decline in lock industry is observed in modern times and other industries like leather, handloom, and aggro opportunities have gained significance. Silk, muslin and blanket manufacturing is common in Dindigul and after Coimbatore, the city has the second largest textile spindling capacity in the State. Chinnalapatti silk, a brand of silk saree is produced out of Chinnalapatti located 11 km (6.8 mi) from the city. The climate condition of the region is conducive for horticulture and agriculture. The district at large produce non-food crops like coffee, flowers, tobacco, and eucalyptus. Dindigul is the center for wholesale trading of fruits like orange, pineapple, sapota and guava, and vegetables like onion.

Dindigul was an important center of trade in tobacco and manufacture of cigars during the British times. A favorite cigar of Winston Churchill called Churut, the 'Light of Asia', was produced in Dindigul. The tobacco industry is one of the main sources of employment for the inhabitants of Dindigul. The central government has a research center for tobacco in Vedasandur. This is one of the two centers in India, the other one is Rajamundri. In modern times, it has the largest trading center in the state for chewing tobacco and scented betel nuts. Well-known brands of scented chewing tobacco like Angu Vilas, Roja Supari etc. operate out of the city and sent to various places in the state and outside. Dindigul is also one of the leading leather producers and suppliers in the state.

== Municipal Administration and Politics ==
Corporation officials
Mayor	Tmt. J. Ilamathi
Deputy Mayor	Thiru. S. Rajappa
Commissioner	Thiru. S. Sivasubramanian, B.Sc, BL.,
Structure
*Corporation Councillor(48)*: SPA (37); DMK (30); INC (2); CPI(M) (3); IUML (1); VCK (1); Opposition (6): AIADMK (5); BJP (1); Others (5): Independent (5)
Elected members
Member of Legislative Assembly	I. P. Senthil Kumar
Member of Parliament	R. Sachithanantham

On 1 November 1866, Dindigul became a municipality. It was promoted to a special-grade municipality as of 1988 and the entire municipal area was included in the jurisdiction of the municipality. On 10 April 2013, it was announced that the municipality would be upgraded to a municipal corporation. On 19 February 2014, Chief Minister of Tamil Nadu, J. Jayalalithaa declared that Dindigul Municipality has been upgraded to Corporation status with immediate effect. The said government order was handed over to the Municipal Chairman, G. Marudharaj The Dindigul municipality has 48 wards and there is an elected councillor for each of those wards. The functions of the municipality are devolved into six departments: general administration/personnel, Engineering, Revenue, Public Health, city planning and Information Technology (IT). All these departments are under the control of a Municipal Commissioner who is the executive head. The legislative powers are vested in a body of 48 members, one each from the 48 wards. The legislative body is headed by an elected Chairperson assisted by a Deputy Chairperson.

Dindigul comes under the Dindigul assembly constituency and it elects a member to the Tamil Nadu Legislative Assembly once every five years. From the 1977 elections, All India Anna Dravid Munnetra Kazhagam (AIADMK) won the assembly seat two times (in 1984 and 1991 elections); Communist Party of India (Marxist) (CPI(M)) six times (1977, 1989, 1996, 2001, 2006 and 2011) and once by Dravida Munnetra Kazhagam (DMK, 1996). The current MLA of the constituency is C.Sreenivasan from AIADMK party.

Dindigul is a part of the Dindigul Lok Sabha constituency and elects its member to Parliament once in five years. The constituency was held by the Indian National Congress four times (1957, 1962, 2004 and 2009 elections), Dravida Munnetra Kazhagam (DMK) three times (1967, 1971 and 1980 elections), Anna Dravida Munnetra Kazhagam (ADMK) for seven times (1977, 1984, 1989, 1991, 1998, 1999 and 2014 elections) and by Tamil Maanila Congress (TMC) once (1996 elections).

Law and order in the town is maintained by the Dindigul sub division of the Tamil Nadu Police headed by a Deputy Superintendent. There are three police stations in the town, one of them being an all-women police station. There are special units like prohibition enforcement, district crime, social justice and human rights, district crime records and special branch that operate at the district level police division headed by a Superintendent of Police.

== Education and utility services ==
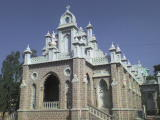
St. Mary's Hr. Sec. School is one of the oldest schools in the city, since 1850.

As of 2011, there are 19 municipal primary schools, 23 other primary schools, eight middle schools and 13 higher secondary schools in the city. There were ten other private schools within the town. There were three engineering colleges and three arts and science colleges. Gandhigram Rural university and Mother Teresa Women's University are the two universities present in Dindigul.

Engineering Colleges

- PSNA College of Engineering and Technology
- SSM Institute of Engineering and Technology
- SBM College of Engineering and Technology
- NPR College of Engineering and Technology
- Jainee College of Engineering and Technology
- Veerammal Engineering College

Electricity supply to Dindigul is regulated and distributed by the Tamil Nadu Electricity Board (TNEB). The town along with its suburbs forms the Dindigul Electricity Distribution Circle. A Chief Distribution engineer is stationed at the regional headquarters. Water supply is provided by the Dindigul Municipal Corporation from Athoor Kamarajar Water Supply Scheme (9.6 MLD), Peranai Water Supply Scheme (7.5 MLD) and Cauvery combined water supply Scheme (6-10 MLD). As of 2001, the total water supply of the town in 14 MLD every day. As per the municipal data for 2011, about 92 metric tonnes of solid waste were collected from Dindigul every day by door-to-door collection and subsequently the source segregation and dumping was carried out by the sanitary department of the Dindigul municipality. There is no underground drainage system in the town and the sewerage system for disposal of sullage is through septic tanks, open drains and public conveniences.

The municipality maintained a total of 117.0 km (72.7 mi) of storm water drains in 2011. As of 2011, the municipality maintained a total of 5,489 street lamps: 754 sodium lamps, 173 mercury vapour lamps, 4,551 tube lights and eight high mast beam lamp. The municipality operates one daily market, namely the Dindigul Municipal Market that cater to the needs of the town and the rural areas around it.

The municipality maintains four dispensaries, five maternity homes, eight family planning centres, three Siddha and one Ayurvedic centre. The Government District Headquarters Hospital is located in Dindigul and has 350 beds. The town has more than five private hospitals, 35 maternity centres, 15 laboratories and one blood bank. The historic St. Joseph Mission Hospital with a bed strength of 250 beds is one of the major hospitals in the city. For all the advanced health care systems, Madurai city is the nearest destination.

Houses in the city are often built close together. Some houses are painted in bright colours such as yellow, orange, and blue. These colours are also used on some temple facades in the region.The use of these colours has been associated with religious traditions in the region.

There are several noteworthy architectural constructions in Dindigul, owing to its rich history and glorified past.

== Transportation ==
The Dindigul city corporation maintains 131.733 km (81.855 mi) of roads. The town has 21.66 km (13.46 mi) concrete roads, 98.311 km (61.088 mi) bituminous roads, 9.352 km (5.811 mi) earthen roads and 2.41 km (1.50 mi) cut stone pavements. There are three national highways, NH 44 (largest highway in India) connecting Dindigul to Madurai and NH 45A connecting Chennai to Kanyakumari, and NH 83 Coimbatore to Nagapattinam via Oddanchatram, Palani, Dindigul, Tiruchirapalli, Thanjavur via the city. National Highway 383 (India) NH383 is connecting Dindigul City to Karaikudi towards east direction for a distance of 108 km (67 mi). Natham road and Bathalagundu road are the two state highways that pass via the city. Being the district headquarters, a lot of district roads also connect Dindigul to other parts of the district.

Dindigul is served by town bus service, which provides connectivity within the town and the suburbs. Minibus service operated by private companies cater to the local transport needs. There are 150 town buses operated daily across 128 different routes. The Kamarajar bus stand is an A-grade bus stand covering an area of 5.37 acres (21,700 m^{2}) as of 2007 and is located in the heart of the town. The Tamil Nadu State Transport Corporation operates daily services connecting various cities to Dindigul. The State Express Transport Corporation operates long-distance buses to Chennai, Bengaluru and Tirupati. There is a significant truck transport with around 400–450 trucks entering the town for loading and unloading activities daily. Three wheelers, called autos and Call Taxi are also a common public transport system.

Dindigul Junction railway station was established in 1875 when rail line for Trichy to Tuticorin was constructed. Dindigul railway junction is located in the rail head from Chennai to Madurai and Karur to Madurai. It is connecting Dindigul to Palani. All south bound trains plying south to Madurai from Chennai pass via Dindigul. There are also passenger trains running either side from Madurai to Tiruchirapalli and Palani. The Dindigul to Palani railway line was electrified in 2022.

The nearest local and international airport is Madurai Airport located 90 kilometres (56 mi) away.

== Culture ==
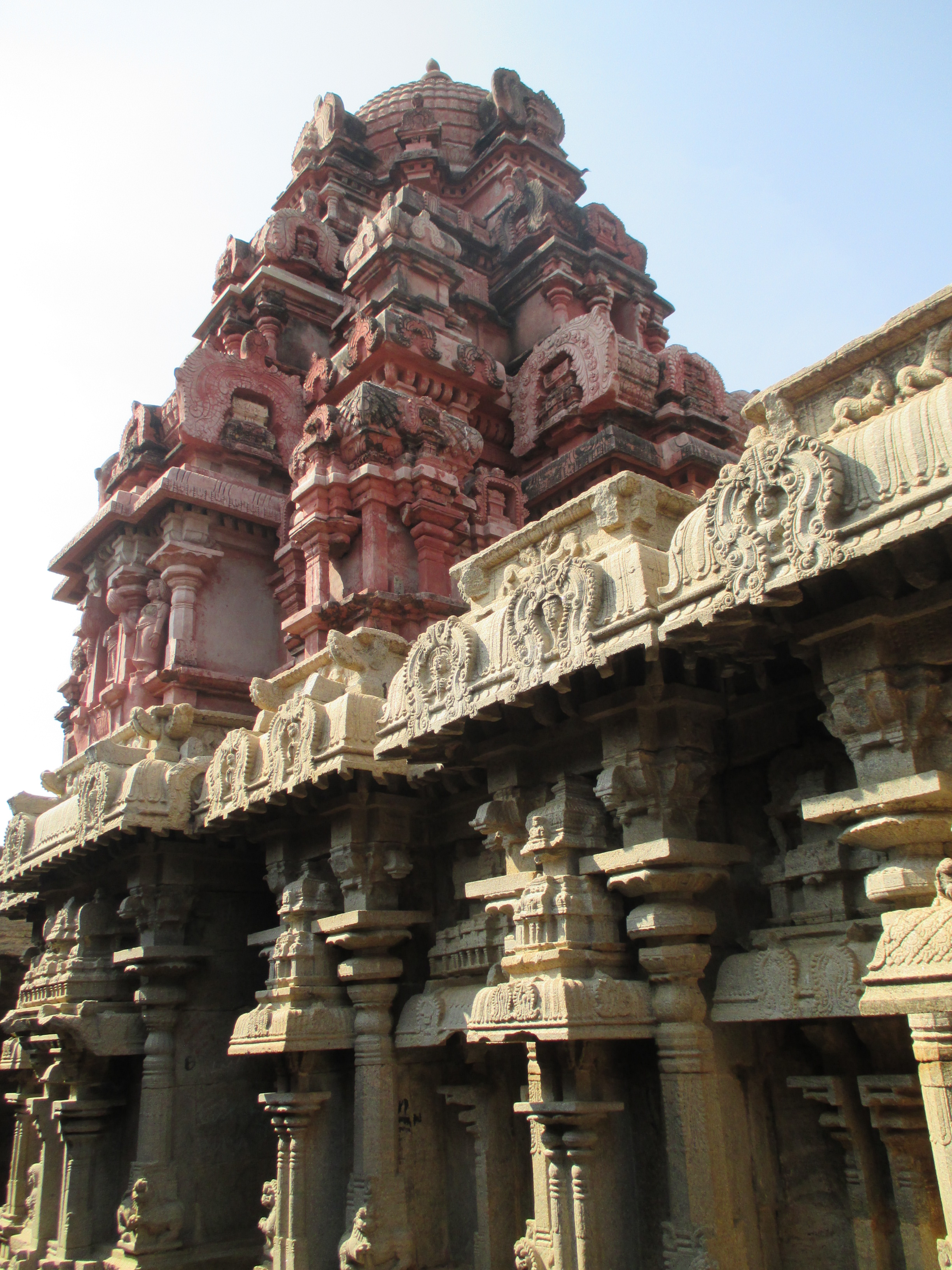
Temple at Dindigul Fort

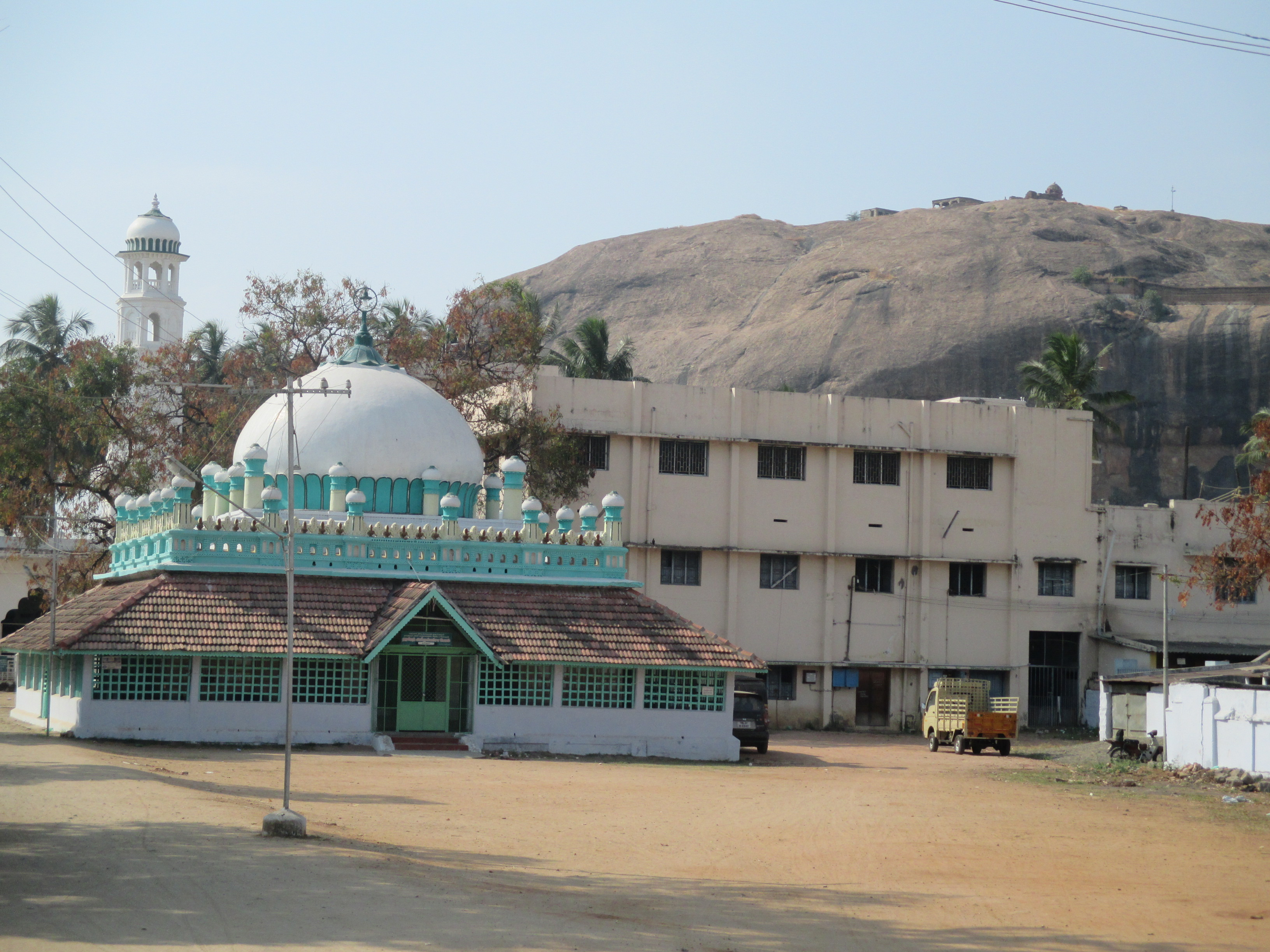
Begampur Mosque, the oldest mosque in the city, with Dindigul fort in the background

Dindigul is the 18th Shakthi Peetam known as "Sri Abhiraamaa Peetam".

Numerous temples, mosques and churches are found in Dindigul.

The Kalahastheeswara-Gnanambika temple was built during the 14th century. The Seenivasaperumal temple built in the bottom of the hill was eroded by time. By the 16th century Pandyan acquired the whole chera kingdom with the support of Vijayanagar king Sachudevarayer. Sachudevarayer, on his visit in 1538 A.D. ordered for the repair works of the temple of Abirami Amman and Padmagirinathar. This is inferred from the script written over stone in the Fort temple. Muthukrisna Nayak became the king of Pandaya kingdom in 1602 A.D. He built the strong hill fort in 1605 to secure Dindigul from invasion. He also built a fort at the bottom of the hill, which was later called Pettaiwall. Thirumalai Nayak redressed the Hill fort and he built the front hall of the Kalahastheeswaraswamy temple. Soundararaja Perumal temple in Thadikombu was erected during his reign. During his Nayak's stay in Dindigul, he fell into sickness and believed to have prayed Rangaperumal to relieve his sickness. Rani Mangammal built the six hundred steps for the hill fort. during the months of January and February, a festival honoring Mariamman is celebrated in this temple. It has a sri abirami amman temple, which is reconstructed. Arulmigu Abirami Amman temple is a holy place situated in Dindigul in Tamil Nadu, India. This is one of the important "Shivasthalam" where you can find Padmagiriswarar—Abirami Amman and Kalahastheeswarar—Gnanambigai Sannathi's. The rock hill is called Padmachala, Padmagiri, Lotus Hill.

The Dindigul fort is the most appreciated and widely acclaimed. The architecture of this fort has evolved through the different dynasties that ruled over Dindigul. The rock fort is 900 feet tall and has a circumference of 2.75 kilometres. Cannon and gunfire artillery were included in the fort during the 17th century. The people here are eloquent in different formats of arts such as- visual arts, music and dances. In Dindigul, classical dance is one of the favourite hobbies of the people. Apart from classical dance, classical vocal music and Karnatic Raag Sangeet are very common amongst the people here. A number of music and dance schools in Dindigul trains both young and adults on classical music and dance.

Dindigul is famous for its biryani. The Dindigul biryani chains are famous all over Tamil Nadu. Dindigul biryani is a common and popular dish, and Dindigul is sometimes called Biryani City.

Sherumalai Mountain, which is the home for a very special variety of small but sweet bananas, is located in the vicinity. Dindigul's food pallet enjoys the taste of it in raw and in various snack forms. Rice, Sambar and Rasam form the main meals of the people here.

Joseph's Church at the heart of the town is known for its vast space, architecture and the glass works and special artistic work all over the church. The church was built between 1866 and 1872. It is the headquarters of Dindigul diocese of Roman Catholic Churches in Dindigul.

== People ==
The people of Dindigul has a history of traditional and generational occupations. which preserve regional Indian traditions and handicrafts have taken up various traditional and generational occupations in order to ensure the continuity of various Indian traditions and handicrafts.

According to 2011 census, Dindigul had a population of 207,327 with a sex-ratio of 1,012 females for every 1,000 males. This was much above the national average of 929. The average literacy of the city was 81.69% against the national average of 72.99%.The city had a total of 53573 households.

Women generally wear a fabric drape around them, 6 to 8 yards of length. First tied round the waist with pleats gathered in front and then brought over the right shoulder, covering their breasts. A part of the drape is either let free hanging from the shoulder or brought in front along the waist. Apart from sari, younger and unmarried women can also be seen wearing stitched salwars and Kurtas and skirts and blouses. There is also a considerable variety of gold jewellery, women like to adorn themselves with. Ornaments like nose pins, anklets, ear rings, bangles and waist belts or a waist dangler carrying bunch of keys are common to this place. Some common designs of nose pins may have a circular metal ring.

== More references ==
- Nelson, James Henry (1989). The Madura Country: A Manual. Asian Educational Services. ISBN 9788120604247.
