= Economy of Tiruchirappalli =

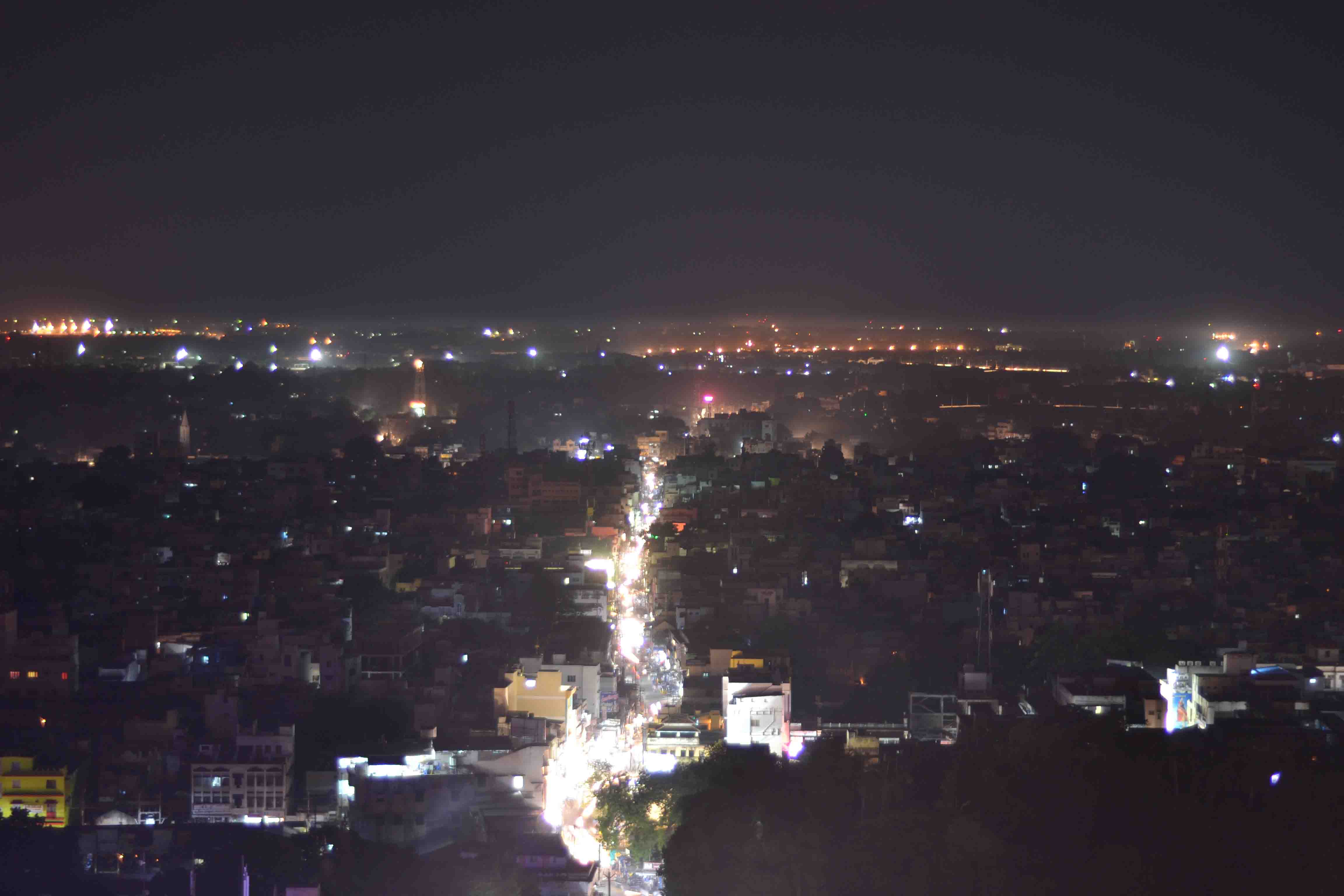
Trichy at night

The economy of Tiruchirappalli is mainly industrial. The factories of Ordnance Factories Board such as Ordnance Factory Tiruchirappalli and Heavy Alloy Penetrator Project. Bharat Heavy Electricals Limited (BHEL), and Golden Rock Railway Workshop are located in Tiruchirappalli. Due to the presence of boiler manufacturing units BHEL and Cethar Vessels, Tiruchirappalli is also known as the "Boiler capital of India".

== Cigars ==
Tiruchirappalli was popular throughout the British Empire for its unique variety of cheroot known as the Trichinopoly cigar. The Trichinopoly cigar was actually manufactured from tobacco grown near the town of Dindigul near the present-day Tiruchirappalli. The characteristics of the ashes produced by the fabled Trichinopoly are described by Arthur Conan Doyle's fictitious detective Sherlock Holmes in his 1887 novel A Study in Scarlet. At its peak, over 12 million cigars were manufactured and exported annually. Tanned hides and skins from Tiruchirappalli were exported to the UK.

== Markets ==
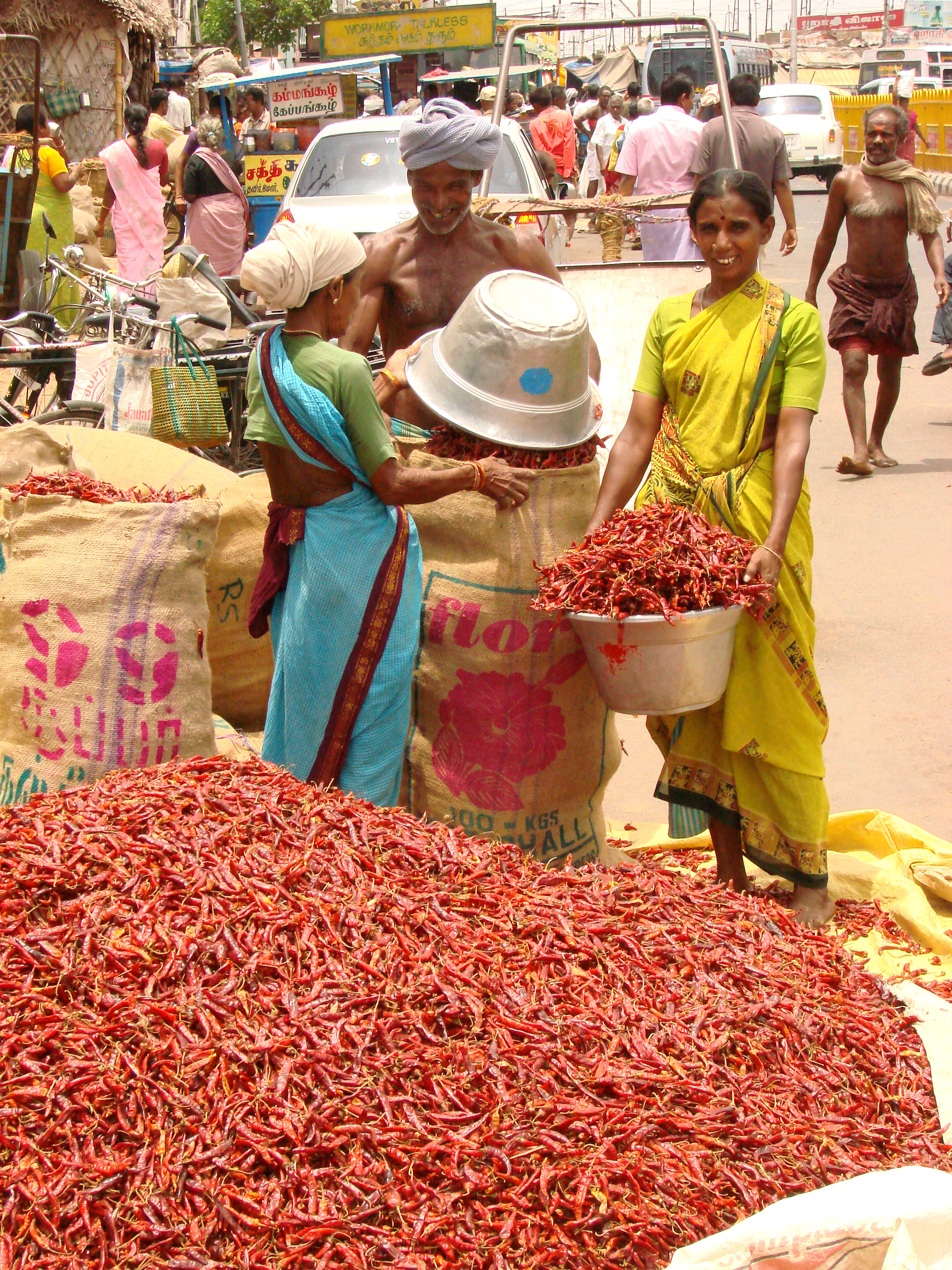
Chilli vendors in Tiruchirappalli

The city has a number of retail and wholesale markets, the chief among them being the Gandhi market which is an important source of vegetables for the whole region.

== Retail chains ==
Popular textile stores like The Chennai Silks, Pothys and Naidu Hall and jewellery stores JOYALUKKAS and Jos Alukkas have showrooms in Tiruchirappalli. There are also branches of Chennai-based eatery Adyar Ananda Bhavan.

== Industries ==
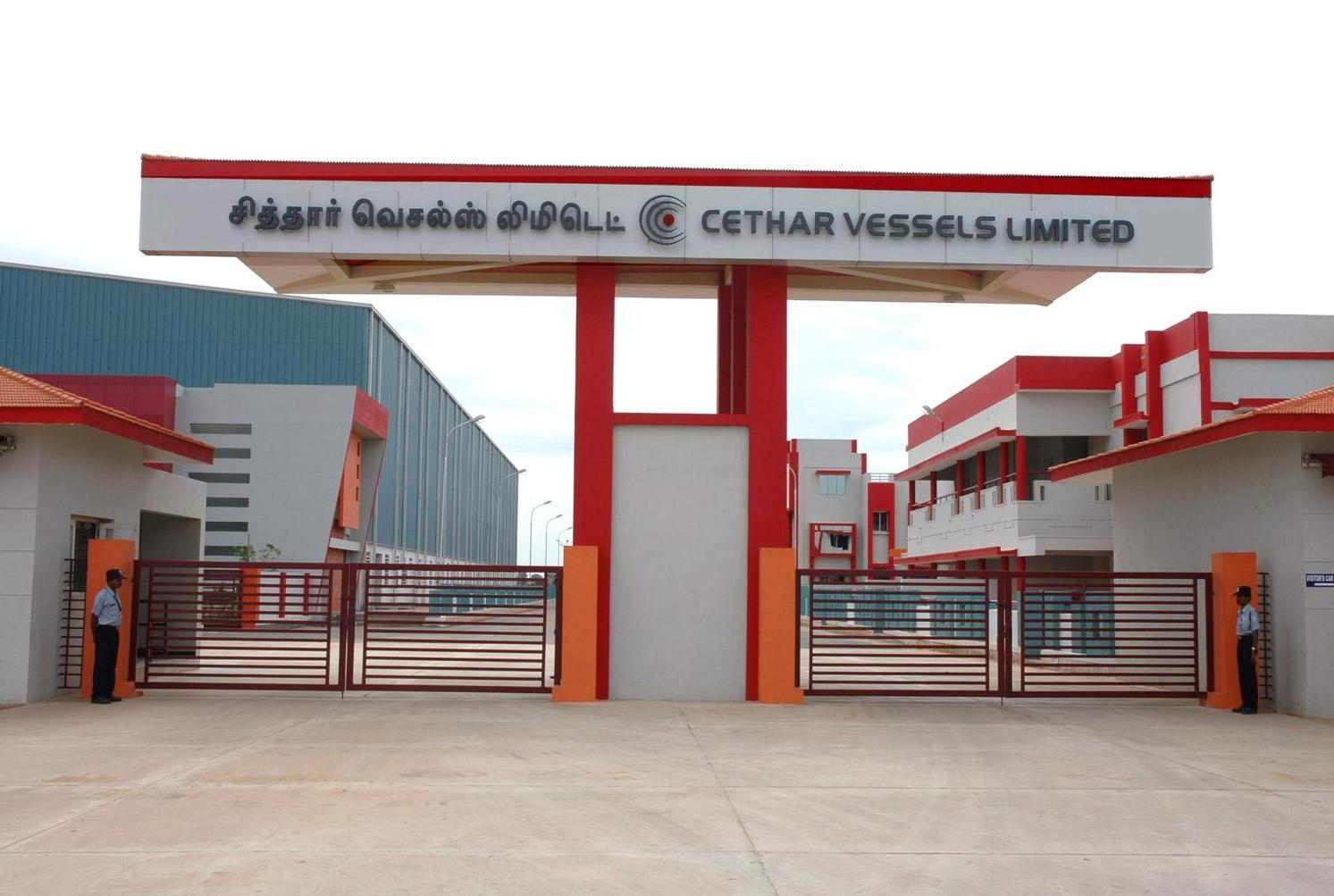
The entrance to Unit-7 of Cethar Vessels Private Limited

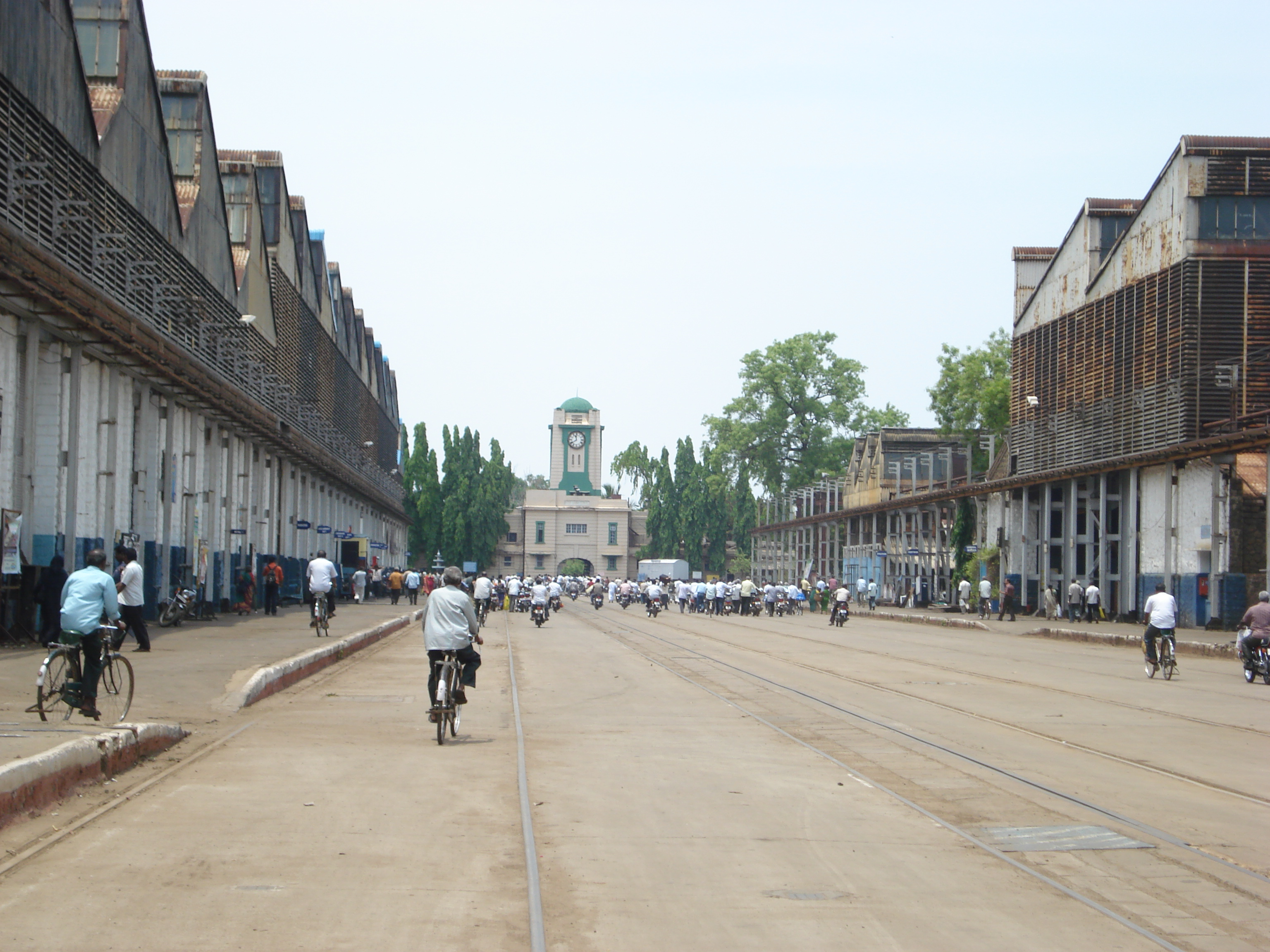
Golden Rock Railway Workshop

Tiruchirappalli is a major engineering equipment manufacturing hub in Tamil Nadu. The Golden Rock Railway Workshop, moved to Tiruchirappalli from Nagapattinam in 1928, is one of the three railway workshop–cum–production unit in Tamil Nadu. The workshops produced 650 conventional and low-container flat wagons during the year 2007–08. The chief workshop manager's office at Golden Rock was awarded a star rating by the Bureau of Energy Efficiency for the proper and regulated usage of electricity in its offices.

A High Pressure Boiler manufacturing plant was set up by the Bharat Heavy Electricals Limited (BHEL), India's largest public sector engineering company, in May 1965. This was followed by a Seamless Steel Plant set up at a cost of ₹580 million (US$6.2 million) and a Boiler Auxiliaries Plant. The three manufacturing units constitute the BHEL industrial complex and cover a total area of about 22,927.4 square metres (246,788 ft^{2}). The plant can generate up to 6.2 megawatts (8,300 hp) of electricity using coal as a resource. Other important industries in Tiruchirappalli include the Trichy Distilleries and Chemicals Limited (TDCL) which was established at Senthaneerpuram in the then Golden Rock municipality in 1966. and the Trichy Steel Rolling Mills which was started as a private limited company on 27 June 1961. The Trichy Distilleries and Chemicals Limited manufactures rectified spirit, acetaldehyde, acetic acid, acetic anhydride and ethyl acetate. It is one of the biggest private sector distilleries in Tamil Nadu and produced 13.5 million litres of spirit alcohol between December 2005 and November 2006.

Cethar Vessels is a boiler plant based in Tiruchirappalli. It was established in the year 1981 and started manufacturing activities in 1984. Achieved a sales turnover of ₹14.05 billion (US$150 million) in 2007–2008. Present net worth of the company is ₹3.32 billion (US$35 million). Cethar Vessels are in the fore front of meeting the requirements of a wide spectrum of industry with their products and services. Be it Boilers for Power Generation or for Steam Generation in Process Industries, Cethar have over two decades' experience. Boiler Auxiliaries, including Fans, Electrostatic Precipitator, Cooling Towers, Fuel Handling Systems, and Water Treatment Systems are also in Cethar's repertoire. Cethar's personnel can build Power Plants whether Captive or Co-Generation mode, in an EPC Basis. The needs of Industries such as Paper, Chemical, Steel, Cement, Distilleries, Textiles, Rayons, Sugar, Food, PetroChemicals and various other Process industries, can be met by Cethar with their modern Boiler Technologies.

== Weapon manufacturing units ==
The Ordnance Factory Tiruchirappalli (OFT) and Heavy Alloy Penetrator Project (HAPP) are defence establishments, operated by the Indian Ordnance Factories Board located at a distance of about 25 kilometres (16 mi) from the heart of Tiruchirappalli. They are amongst the 41 Indian Ordnance Factories operated by the OFB throughout India. OFT was established in 1966 by the then Prime Minister of India, Indira Gandhi and HAPP in 1980s as a unit of Defence Research and Development Organisation in collaboration with other government defence agencies and under the assistance of some foreign partners. It was later on handed over to OFB after full scale development of the product was completed, to start the full-scale production. The factory produces the Fin Stabilized Armor Piercing Discarding Sabot (FSAPDS) which is a weapon of high kinetic energy used in tanks and other armor-piercing ammunition.

== Software ==
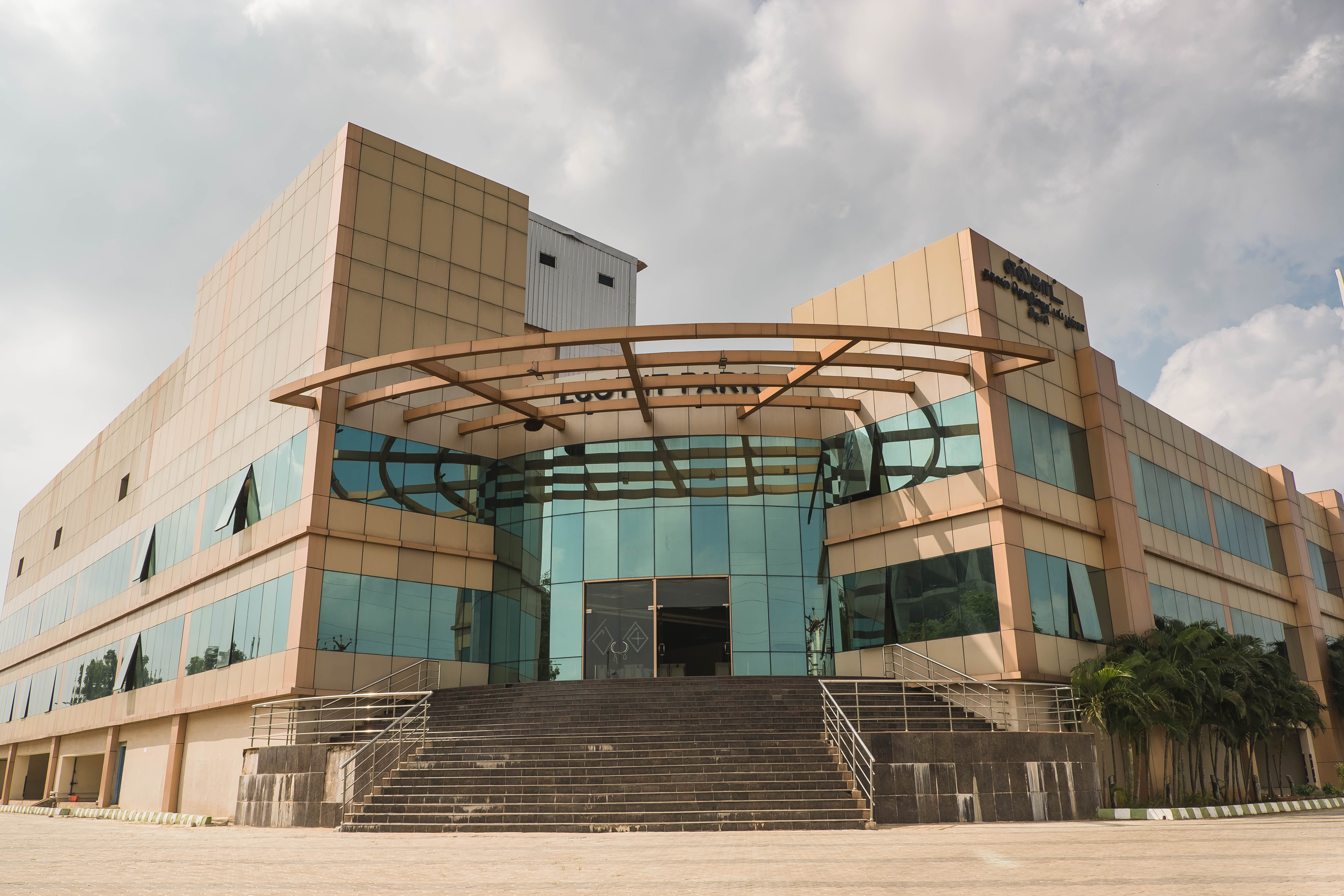
Vuram's Office at ELCOT IT Park, Tiruchirappalli

The annual software exports of the Tiruchi region amount to ₹ 262 million (US$5.8 million). The ELCOT IT Park, the first IT park in the city has been commissioned at a cost of ₹ 600 million (US$13.5 million) and inaugurated by the Deputy Chief Minister of Tamil Nadu, M. K. Stalin on 9 December 2010. Set up by the Electronics Corporation of Tamil Nadu, the park occupies an area of 59.74 hectares (147.6 acres) and constitutes a Special Economic Zone that has employs 1535 people in the various organizations functioning from the IT park as of December 2021.

In 2017, the hyperautomation services company, Vuram that specializes in low-code enterprise automation started operations at the ELCOT IT Park Trichy. The organization's technology stack encompasses business process management (BPM), robotic process automation (RPA), optical character recognition (OCR), document processing, and analytics. The organization has announced that it will continue to expand its workforce in the region hiring 400 more employees across India. Also, the Indian software company Infosys, is planning to start its operations in Tiruchirappalli. Infosys Foundation, the philanthropic and CSR arm of Infosys, has signed an MoU with the Indian Institute of Information Technology (IIIT) - Tiruchirapalli to construct a 100-bed hostel for girls on their campus.
