= Golden Rock =

Golden Rock may refer to:

- Kyaiktiyo Pagoda, Burma
- Golden Rock, Tiruchirappalli, Tamil Nadu, India
  - Golden Rock Railway Workshop
  - Golden Rock railway station
  - Golden Rock Diesel Loco Shed
  - Golden Rock Shandy, shopping mall
  - Battle of Golden Rock, 1753
- A nickname for the island of Sint Eustatius and a former plantation on that island
  - Golden Rock (anthem)
  - Golden Rock African Burial Ground
  - Golden Rock (archaeological site)
- A former name of Red Rock Island, a 6-acre island located in the San Francisco Bay.
