= Railway Mixed Higher Secondary School, Golden Rock, Tiruchirappalli =

Government school in Golden Rock, Tiruchirappalli, Tamil Nadu, India

Railway Mixed Higher Secondary School

Location
- Railway Colony, Ponmalai; Tiruchirappalli, Tamil Nadu; India; 10°47′06″N 78°43′05″E

Information
- Type: Government school
- Motto: Study Serve Shine
- Established: 1923; 103 years ago
- Status: Open
- School district: Tiruchirappalli
- Oversight: Railway Board
- President: Divisional Railway Manager/ Chief Personnel Officer
- Correspondent: Workshop Personnel Officer
- Administrator: M. Ramakrishnan (Chief Educational Officer)
- Principal: P. M. Amaranathan
- Teaching staff: 29
- Grades: 1 - 12
- Enrollment: 793
- Houses: 4 Houses
- Colours: Navy Blue and White
- Athletics: Yes
- Accreditation: Anglo Indian School Leaving Certificate (Anglo-Indian Board) and HSC
- Schedule: Monday-Friday, except state and district holidays
- Information: Official Contact

Railway Mixed Higher Secondary School, commonly Railway School or RMHSS or RMHS/EM/GOC is a Government coed day school located at Golden Rock, Tiruchirappalli, Tamil Nadu. It is one among 42 schools in the state and among 4 schools in the Tiruchirapalli Revenue district that follows both Anglo-Indian Board of Education and Higher Secondary Board, catering to pupils from Class I to Class XII in bilingual pattern, viz., English and Tamil, which are the medium of instruction.

== History and background ==
Prior to the 18th century, Golden Rock, was earlier referred by Robert Orme to the British as Sugar-Loaf Rock, where after the Battle of Golden Rock, the erstwhile Trichinopoly was divided into two parts, one called the Cantonment, which contains the residences of European & Anglo-Indian community and the garrison-barracks for stationing the European and Indian Regiments. The cantonment then comprised the present day areas of Cantonment, Tiruchirappalli Junction, Senthaneerpuram, Varahaneri, Golden Rock, Tiruchirapalli Central Prison and other major parts of southern and eastern trichy. During 1878, when the Afghan War broke, the whole of the European troops were withdrawn. According to Oral lore, some parts of the barracks were converted to dispensary and clinic. Later, the buildings were transformed for Cholera/T.B. Hospital and again as barracks and again to hospital, which was mostly devoted and preferred for the Europeans and Anglo-Indians. Around the 1920s, provision was contemplated for a Railway School since there were considerations to move the railway workshop from Negapatnam to Trichinopoly, for strategic purposes, for which foundations were laid in 1926 and permanently moved in 1928. Around the same time, two Railway schools at primary level in English Medium and Tamil Medium were established during 1923 and 1925 respectively along with an exclusive Divisional Railway Hospital was also set up and started to function here since 1927. Post-independence the administration was transferred to Indian Railways, which opened many more such schools, where quality education is provided at subsidized cost to about one lakh children of railway employees and about 30,000 non-railway wards. There are about 5,500 teachers and about 1,100 non-teaching staff employed in these railway schools. Indian Railways also supports many Kendriya Vidyalayas for the benefit of wards of railway employees. Under British rule, initially the school served the purpose only for Europeans and British children, then extended to Anglo-Indians and finally exclusive to the wards of Railway employees who serve anywhere in India. In the early 1990s, admission was open to all, with substantially a little higher fee for wards of Non-Railway employees than that of Railway employee. Preference of admission is given only for wards of Railway employee. Now, this school has been elevated to Higher Secondary School.

== Campus ==
The school is spread over a sprawling 20 acres (8.1 ha) site, which has sufficient spacious classrooms to accommodate enough pupils. Initially, the students were taught at the building of now-defunct Railway Mixed Higher Secondary School/Tamil Medium, which was then High School (Class I - Class X) for both Tamil/English Medium since a Primary School (Class I - Class V) for Tamil Medium was established amidst “C” Type Quarters in 1925 and Middle School (Class I - Class VIII) was functioning within North “D” Quarters, which also housed a CSI Church. Around the 1980s, the present premises of the school was utilised only for the High School as the sections of Primary Classes were functioning at the premises of Office of Chief Mechanical Engineer, Central Workshops, Golden Rock, where the pupils here would assemble at the main campus which was about 400m away, for the purpose of daily morning prayers and important events.

The school has a large central hexagonal hall with classrooms along with labs at every 90 degree (like a compass view). Later on when the large and additional building (with ground and first floor) was completed along with improvement in other basic amenities like additional privy, bicycle parking stand, drinking water, entire pupils of the school were moved under one premises. Recently, this school was elevated to Higher Secondary School accepting students for both English and Tamil Mediums.

Apart from the facilities inside the main campus, the school is also allowed to use the nearby Railway Community hall, Dr.B.R.Ambedkar Common Wedding hall, Railway Sports playground, Railway Gym Club, Railway Cinema hall and other Railway buildings for bona fide educational and recreational purposes either at very nominal cost or at free of cost.

== Extracurricular activities ==
The Annual School day is organized during the second fortnight of January month or the first fortnight of February month. During which events like, drama, mime, elocution, quiz, debate, essay writing, Craftwork, Choir, drawing and other activities are conducted and top three performers are awarded with certificate. Also top three rank holders every class of previous academic year are honoured with certificate. The students are also allowed to participate in inter-railway and inter-zonal competitions. Apart from these students are also involved in Green Club, National Service Scheme, Literary Club, Social awareness rallies, etc.,

=== Sports ===
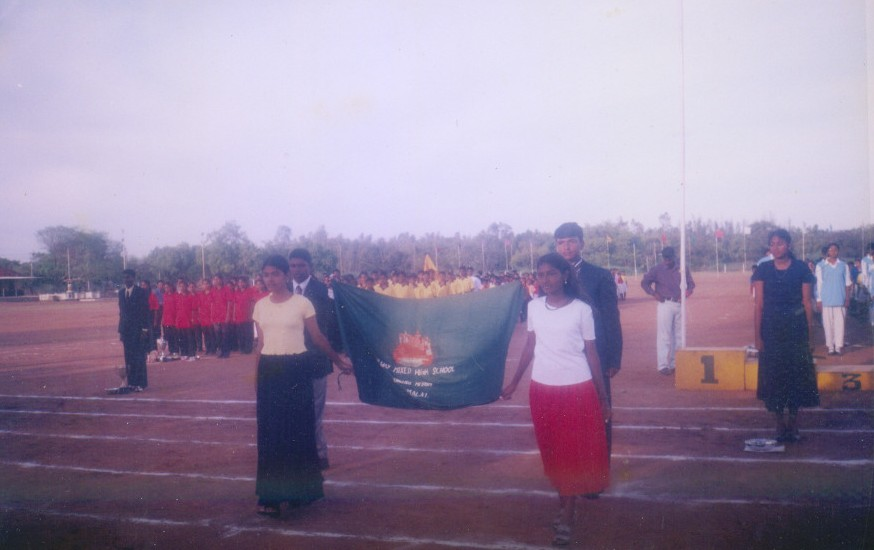
Closing ceremony at a Sports day

Students from all classes were encouraged to participate in various sports events. Students right from Class VI till Class XII were alphabetically partitioned and accommodated to the four houses almost within one month from the start of the academic year. During Independence Day, Annual Sports day and Republic day, the students are trained and assembled to perform a mass physical exercise drill to the musical tune of big drum. Apart from these, hand-picked students for parade and sports events were allowed to participate for Independence day and Republic day celebrations at Central Workshop, Golden Rock and also to Inter-School, Inter-Railway, Zonal, District and State-level competitions.

=== Houses ===
Following are the houses where, inter house competitions are held every year. Each house gets points based on their performance. The house which gets most points at the end of the year will be winner of the year.

Colour	Name of House
	Blue House
	Green House
	Red House
	Yellow House

== Railway support ==
In 2018, Indian Railways announced its intent to withdraw support for its Railway Schools after 2018-19. Later, it revised its position, announcing support for schools with fifteen to twenty wards of railway employees.

== See also ==
- History of Tiruchirappalli
- Education in Tamil Nadu
- Indian Railways
