= Tiruchirappalli Palakkarai railway station =

Railway station in Tamil Nadu, India

Tiruchirappalli Palakkarai

General information
- Location: Palakkarai, Sangiliyandapuram, Tiruchirappalli district, Tamil Nadu; India
- Coordinates: 10.8078°N 78.6941°E
- Elevation: 81 metres (266 ft)
- System: Indian Railways station
- Owner: Indian Railways
- Operator: Southern Railway zone
- Platforms: 1
- Tracks: 1

Construction
- Structure type: Standard (on ground station)
- Parking: Yes
- Accessible: Disabled access

Other information
- Status: Functioning
- Station code: TPE
- Zone(s): Southern Railway zone
- Division(s): Tiruchirappalli
Route map
Location
- Location within India Location within Tamil Nadu

Tiruchirappalli Palakkarai railway station is a railway station in Palakkarai, Sangiliyandapuram suburb of Tiruchirappalli District in Tamil Nadu.

== Jurisdiction ==
It belongs to the Tiruchirappalli railway division of the Southern Railway zone in Tiruchirappalli district of Tamil Nadu. The station code is TPE.

== Lines ==
This station falls between Tiruchirappalli Junction–Karur Junction broad-gauge section.
