= Tennur =

Tennur தென்னூர்
- Neighbourhood
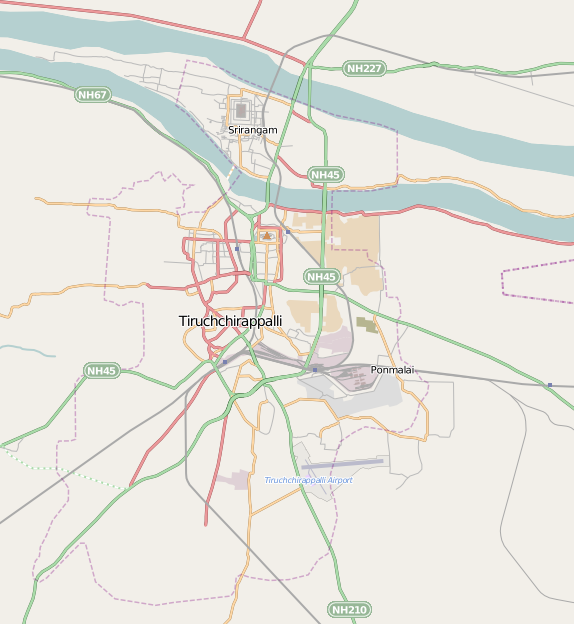
- Location within Tiruchirapalli
- Coordinates: 10°49′3″N 78°41′13″E
- Country: India
- State: Tamil Nadu
- Time zone: UTC+5.30 (IST)

Tennur (Tamil: தென்னூர்) is a business locality in the city of Tiruchirappalli in Tamil Nadu, India. It is situated close to the Mahatma Gandhi market and forms a part of the Abhishekapuram zone of the Tiruchirappalli Municipal Corporation. The Tiruchirappalli branch of the Dakshin Bharat Hindi Prachar Sabha is located here.
