= Sangiliyandapuram =

Sangiliandapuram
- Neighbourhood
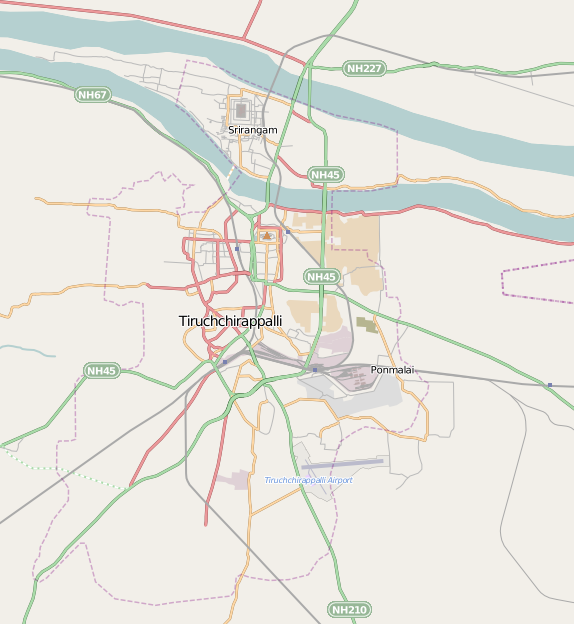
- Location within Tiruchirapalli
- Coordinates: 10°47′51.71″N 78°42′16.92″E
- Country: India
- State: Tamil Nadu
- District: Tiruchirappalli
- Time zone: UTC+5.30 (IST)
- Postal code: 620 001

Sangiliyandapuram (Tamil: சங்கிலியாண்டபுரம்) is a neighbourhood in the city of Tiruchirappalli in Tamil Nadu, India

== Etymology ==
The etymology is from a temple dedicated to Sangiliyandavar located in the area. Because of its close proximity to Ponmalai workshop and downtown of the city, retired railway employees from the workshop were the first people to set up their homes here, most of whom were the Anglo-Indians of Pinto Colony.

== Famous ==
The area is famous for its contribution to Tamil cinema and aluminium works. Sangilyandapuram was the epicentre of aluminium works in Tamil Nadu. Many metal workshops including Trichy Metals Ltd., has their presence here. With the advent of Stainless Steel the business started to lose its sheen and now only a few workshops dot the area.

=== Boys Company ===
M.R. Radha colony was the farmhouse of the actor M.R. Radha. He ran his Boys Company from here. Boys Company was an entry ticket to Tamil cinema, some actors of Boys Company include M.G. Ramachandran,Sivaji Ganesan, Ravichandran, Kaka Radhakrishnan etc.

Shivaji Ganesan the age of 10, moved here and began to perform in stage plays. From the drama troupe trainers, he was fortunate enough to learn acting and dancing. He was trained in Bharatanatyam, Kathak and Manipuri dance forms. Sivaji Ganesan while staying in his relative's house in Sangiliyandapuram was spotted by Boys Company and later moved to greater heights. . The colony had a theatre, a practising dais and also the samadhi of M.R.Radha. Their famous children Radhika, Radha Ravi, Nirosha spent their early childhood here. Today it is completely demolished for development of real estate properties.

=== Other information ===
Sangiliyandapuram has many religious places such as Madani Masjid, St. Theresa's Church, Arulmigu Selva Kali Amman Thirukovil and Pillayar Temple. Seven Dollars Convent is the only school in the area. Today Sangliyandapuram is famous for trading of woods and plywoods. Many wholesale dealers and woods works have their shops here. Issues of personal hygiene are being highlighted in the area.

=== Main Road - NH Route Access ===
The Sangiliyandapuram Main Road forms the major connection between Palakkarai and NH 45 at Senthaneerpuram through which there is an easy access to Chennai, Dindigul Madurai, Tanjore and Pudukkotai bound route for people who live within the city premises

=== BusRoute ===
The Busroute 52 connects Chathiram Bus Station, Central Bus Station, Trichy Railway Station and Senthaneerpuram

Major Stops within Sangiliyandapuram are Arasamaram, Pillayar Temple / Mariam Theater, Radha Colony
