= History of Tiruchirappalli =

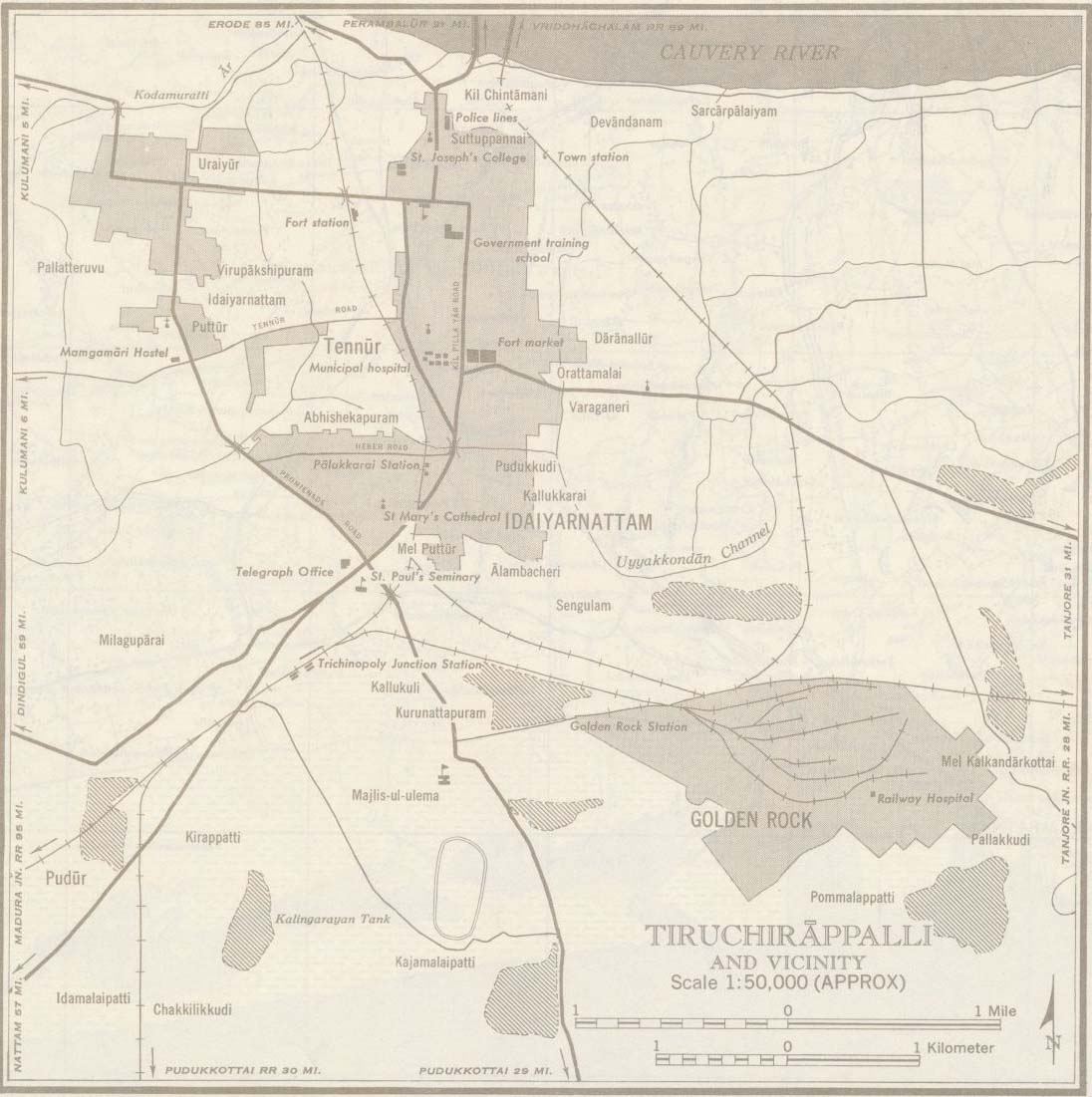
Map of Tiruchirapalli town in 1955

Tiruchirappalli is believed to be of great antiquity and has been ruled by the Early Cholas, Mutharaiyars Early Pandyas, Pallavas, Medieval Cholas, Later Cholas, Later Pandyas, Delhi Sultanate, Ma'bar Sultanate, Vijayanagar Empire, Nayak Dynasty, the Carnatic state and the British at different times. The archaeologically important town of Uraiyur which served as the capital of the Early Cholas is a Neighborhood of Tiruchirapalli.

== Early history ==
Tiruchirappalli and its surroundings are believed to have been inhabited as early as the stone ages. According to V. Kanakasabhai, a race of Nagas inhabited the region before the rise of the Early Cholas.

Sir William Larke, Director of the British Iron and Steel Federation, says -

The centre of origin is variously placed in India, where there are historical traditions and remains indicating a highly developed iron culture. Hyderabad and Trichinopoly are considered by many to have been the centres of production of wootz..... This steel was noted for centuries, being carried by merchants from India to Damascus and Toledo.." Sir William gives the date of this origin of the Iron Age as 1400 to 1500 B.C.E",

== The Early Cholas ==
Under the Early Cholas, Tiruchirappalli became an important administrative and cultural centre. Urayur, the old Tiruchirappalli, is believed to have been their capital. The first ever reference to the Cholas is available in a stone edict of Asoka dated to 300 BC. Tiruchirappalli is also mentioned by Ptolemy in the 3rd century BC. The oldest human-built dam, Kallanai, was built by Karikala Cholan across the Kaveri River about 10 miles (16 km) from Uraiyur.

== The Great Emperor-Mutharaiyar dynasty ==
The Mutharaiyar dynasty was a royal south Indian Royal dynasty that governed the Thanjavur, Trichy and Pudukottai regions between 600 and 950 CE

== The Medieval Cholas ==
In the second half of the 9th century, Tiruchirappalli was reconquered by the Medieval Chola king Vijayalaya Chola who re-established Chola suzerainty over the region. Tiruchirappalli served as a regional stronghold and provincial capital of the Medieval Cholas under whom it reached the zenith of its glory.

The Cholas extended their undisputed sway over the cities of Urayur and Srirangam from the 9th century AD till the death of the last great Chola king Kulothunga I in about 1118.

The Chola state was, however, weakened by the continuous wars which the Later Cholas fought with Hoysalas. Rajendra Chola III, the last independent Chola king, ruled from 1246 to 1279. However, even during his time, the Hoysala king Vira Someshwara made a quick and successful incursion up to Srirangam. His successor Narasimha III made a grant to the Srirangam temple in the year 1256.

== The Pandyas ==
Srirangam was taken by Jatavarman Sundara Pandyan I in 1260 though there are Hoysala inscriptions in Tiruchirappalli district until the year 1296. In 1264 CE, Jatavarman Sundara Pandyan I fought and defeated the Hoysala King Vira Someshwara as attested by his inscription at the Sri Ranganathaswamy Temple in Srirangam. There are also Pandya inscriptions from the reign of Maravarman Kulasekhara I, Jatavarman Sundara Pandya II and Maravarman Kulasekhara II.

In 1310, the Pandya king, Maravarman Kulasekara Pandyan I was murdered by his son Sundara Pandya who ascended the throne. But he was overthrown shortly afterwards by Vira Pandya, an illegitimate son of Maravarman Kulasekhara I. Sundara Pandya sought refuge in the court of Delhi and invited the Muslim general Malik Kafur to invade the kingdom offering him all assistance possible.

Malik Kafur invaded the Pandya kingdom in 1311. Muslim annals describe it as the campaign against 'the country of the yellow-faced Bir'. Vira Pandya was defeated at Kannanur and the temple of Srirangam was ransacked. According to a popular legend, the idol of Ranganatha was captured and taken by the victors to Delhi where a young daughter of the sultan Alauddin Khalji grew fond of the idol and used it as a plaything thereby saving it from apparent destruction. A group of devotees of the temple, meanwhile, travelled all the way to Delhi and managed, in the absence of the princess, to persuade the sultan to grant the idol to them. The princess grew distraught on discovering that the idol had vanished and led a search party to recover it. However, the devotees had crossed Tirupathi by the time. On getting to know of the search party sent after them, three of the most ardent devotees of the god volunteered to take the idol to a cave in the middle of a sparsely-inhabited jungle and guard it there. The idol is believed to have remained in the cave for more than fifty-nine years, until Kampanna Udaiyar's conquest of Srirangam in 1371, when the sole-surviving member of the trio, now in his eighties, conveyed information about the idol to the authorities in Srirangam through the jungle tribes he lived with. Meanwhile, a substitute idol had been installed in the Srirangam temple in 1311 and worship to this idol was continued after the Muslim army withdrew. When the forces of the sultanate invaded again in 1327, the replacement idol had to be moved to safety. The idol was, therefore, moved to Madurai and across the Western Ghats to Travancore, finally ending up at Tirupathi. When in 1371, Kampanna began to renovate the temple, there were two idols of the god. The actual was, therefore, determined with some difficulty and reinstated with due ceremony and a small chamber was built in the temple to the Surathani or the Muslim princess who is worshipped as "Thulukkachi Nachiyar". The idol of the goddess buried under a bilva tree within the complex was also recovered and reinstated.

== Late Medieval Period ==
The Delhi Sultanate managed to establish complete sovereignty over the Pandyan kingdom by 1327. The province of Ma'bar was created and ruled by viceroys appointed by Delhi. In 1335, the then viceroy, Jalaluddin Ahsan Khan declared his independence and founded the Madurai Sultanate. The early sultans had to deal with frequent incursions by Hoysala rulers. The attacks ended with the death of the Hoysala king Veera Ballala III at Tiruchirappalli in 1343.

By the middle of the 14th century, the Madurai Sultanate had begun to decline. Gradually, the Vijayanagar Empire began to establish their control over the northern parts of the kingdom. Tiruchirappalli was taken by the Vijayanagar prince Kampanna Udaiyar in 1371. Following the reconquest, the dilapidated Ranganathaswami temple at Srirangam was restored to its former glory. Madurai, the capital was later taken and by 1378, the Madurai Sultanate had ceased to exist.

The Vijayanagar Empire ruled the region from 1378 till the 1530s. Its rule was characterised by the revival of Hinduism and reconstruction of temples and monuments destroyed by the Muslim rulers. The province of Madurai was created and ruled by a viceroy or Nayak appointed by the Vijayanagar kings.

== Tiruchirappalli under Nayak rule ==
When the Vijayanagar Empire began to decline in the early 1500s, the Nayaks began to assert their independence. The first independent Madura Nayak king was Viswanatha Nayak who ruled from 1538 to 1563. The Tiruchi range comprised five major paalayams: Udayarpalayam, Ariyalur, Marungapuri, Thuraiyur and Cuddalore. They constructed new mandapams at several temples, including the Srirangam Sri Ranganathaswamy Temple, and the Rock Fort.

In 1616, Muttu Virappa Nayak moved the capital from Madurai to Tiruchirappalli. In the 1623 civil war in the Vijayanagar Empire, Muttu Virappa Nayak supported Jagga Raya, a claimant to the throne against Yachama a rival claimant. In the battle fought at Toppur near Tiruchi, Jagga Raya was defeated and killed while Muttu Virappa Nayak was captured. In Muttu Virappa's absence, his son Thirumalai Nayak was crowned king. Thirumalai Nayak moved the seat of government back to Madurai in 1634. In 1665, Chokkanatha Nayak moved the capital once again to Tiruchirappalli. Chokkanatha Nayak partially dismantled the Thirumalai Nayak Mahal in Madurai in order to construct a new palace, now known as Rani Mangammal Mahal in Tiruchirappalli. Chokkanatha was a feeble monarch and faced numerous problems. He intruded into the affairs of the Thanjavur Nayak kingdom. His intrusion ultimately resulted in the interference of the Marathas and the creation of the Thanjavur Maratha kingdom by Venkoji. Mysore troops and the Maravas frequently invaded Tiruchirappalli. Chokkanatha, himself, lost his throne to a Muslim official who ruled for two years as sultan. Chokkanatha died in 1685 and was succeeded by his wife Rani Mangammal, who is considered to be the greatest of the Nayak rulers. During her reign, the Madurai army defeated the Thanjavur Marathas and beat back an invasion of Chikka Deva Raya of Mysore in 1697. In 1695, the Nayak army invaded Travancore and exacted tribute from its king Ravi Varma. Mangammal, however, submitted to the Mughal forces under Zulfiqar Ali Khan in 1697 and had to pay tribute. She was also unable to prevent the formation of the states of Ramnad and Pudukkottai. Mangammal was succeeded by her grandson Vijaya Ranga Chokkanatha during whose reign the kingdom went into irreversible decline. Vijaya Ranga died in 1731 and was succeeded by his wife Meenakshi, the last of the Nayak rulers.

== Invasions of Chanda Sahib ==
The Carnatic general Chanda Sahib invaded Tiruchi for the first time in 1734 when Meenakshi was the Nayak ruler. Meenakshi offered peace and held negotiations with him. Chanda Sahib recognized Meenakshi's sovereignty in return for a fee of rupees one crore and returned to Arcot.

In 1736, Chanda Sahib returned to Tiruchi and in violation of the 1734 treaty, proceeded to make himself master of the kingdom. Humiliated, Meenakshi committed suicide by consuming poison. Chanda Sahib was given the title "Nawab of Tiruchirappalli" and ruled the state from 1736 till 1741, when he was defeated and captured by the Marathas and taken prisoner. Chanda Sahib remained prisoner from 1741 to 1749, when he managed to escape from their clutches. The Maratha general Murari Rao ruled Tiruchirappalli from 1741 to 1743, when the Nizam of Hyderabad invaded Tiruchirappalli and bribed Murari Rao to hand over the city.

== Second Carnatic War ==
In 1749, Anwaruddin Mohammed Khan, the Nawab of Carnatic died, and Chanda Sahib took over the government after driving out the principal claimant Muhammed Ali Khan Wallajah from Arcot. Muhammed Ali Khan Wallajah sought refuge in the fortress of Tiruchirappalli which Chanda Sahib besieged with the help of the French East India Company provoking the British East India Company to come to the rescue of the exiled Nawab. The British allied with the Marathas and sent three armies, which after some initial setbacks, successfully forced Chanda Sahib and the French to come to terms with them. Chanda Sahib surrendered to the Marathas but was treacherously beheaded. Muhammed Ali Khan Wallajah was enthroned with British assistance and he agreed to pay a regular tribute to them.

== British rule ==
Suspecting the Carnatic ruler, Umdat Ul-Umra of having given clandestine support to Tipu Sultan during the Anglo-Mysore Wars, the British East India Company took over the kingdom in 1801 and reduced the Nawab to the status of a titular ruler. The district of Trichinopoly was created and Tiruchi city was made its capital. A cantonment of the Madras Regiment was set up in Tiruchirappalli.

During the 19th century, Tiruchirappalli was famous throughout the British Empire for its unique variety of cheroot known as the Trichinopoly cigar. The municipality of Trichinopoly was created in 1866 as per the Town Improvements Act of 1865 followed by the municipality of Srirangam in 1871 and Golden Rock in 1972. The three municipalities were merged in 1994 to form the Tiruchirappalli municipal corporation. In 1875, the Prince of Wales paid a visit to the Ranganathaswamy Temple and donated a gold cup. The first Indian census conducted in 1871 returned a population of 76,530 for Tiruchirappalli making it the second largest city in Madras Presidency, next only to the capital city of Madras.

The Great Southern of India Railway Company was established in 1853 with its headquarters at Tiruchirappalli. In 1859, the company constructed its first railway line connecting Tiruchirappalli and Nagapattinam. The company was merged with the Carnatic Railway Company in 1874 to form the South Indian Railway Company. The South Indian Railway Company moved one of its principal workshops from Nagapattinam to Tiruchirappalli establishing the Golden Rock Railway Workshop in 1928. The company was eventually liquidated in 1944 and its assets taken over by the Government of India.

Tiruchirappalli played an important part in the Indian Independence Movement. Many of its leaders such as V. V. S. Aiyar, P. Rathinavelu Thevar and T. S. S. Rajan hailed from Tiruchi. Tiruchi played an active role in the 1928 South Indian Railway Strike which lasted over three months. There were also strikes and non-violent protests during the Quit India Movement.

Census	Tiruchirappalli	Srirangam
1871	76,530	11271
1881	84,449	19773
1891	90,609	21632
1901	104,721	23039
1911	123,512	24799
1921	120,422	23153
1931	142,843	24663
1941	159,566	26676
1951	218,921	36702
1961	249,862	41949
1971	307,400	51069
1981	362,045	
1991	387,223	70109
2001	752,066	
2011	846,915	

== After Indian independence ==
In January 1948, there was a massive strike in Trichy Mills where over 350 workers struck work in response to the retrenchment of 178 of their colleagues by the management. Strikes, along with the peasant rebellion in Tanjore, boosted support for the Communist Party of India and K. Ananda Nambiar, a union leader represented Tiruchi in both the Madras legislature as well as the Lok Sabha. In the late 1970s, the then Chief Minister of Tamil Nadu, M. G. Ramachandran planned to move the administrative headquarters of the state to Tiruchi but the move was later shelved by successive governments.
