= Golden Rock railway station =

Railway station in Tamil Nadu, India

Golden Rock Junction railway station

General information
- Other names: Ponmalai Junction railway station
- Location: Golden Rock, Tiruchirappalli, Tamil Nadu; India
- Coordinates: 10.7919°N 78.7100°E
- System: Express train, Passenger train, Commuter rail and Goods railway station
- Owner: Indian Railways
- Operator: Southern Railway zone
- Platforms: 5
- Tracks: 8

Construction
- Parking: Yes
- Cycle facilities: Yes

Other information
- Station code: GOC
- Zone(s): Southern Railway zone
- Division(s): Tiruchirappalli
- Fare zone: Indian Railways

History
- Electrified: 25 kV AC 50 Hz
Track layout
Location

Golden Rock Junction railway station (a.k.a. Ponmalai railway station) (station code: GOC) is an NSG–6 category Indian railway station in the Tiruchirappalli railway division of the Southern Railway zone. In addition to Golden Rock, it serves residents of Subramaniyapuram, Senthaneerpuram, and Sangiliyandapuram.

== Overview ==
The stations handles very high traffic of both passenger and freight trains. It also plays a role of a junction, where trains move west for Tiruchirappalli Junction (TPJ) and Tiruchirappalli Goods Yard (TPGY). Towards west, trains proceeding to Thanjavur and towards north west connecting the chord line.

== Developments ==
Recently, the station got a new facility, housing operating and signal equipment, at the cost of ₹23 lakh (US$24,000). This facility has a station master's panel room, relay room, and electrical and telecom equipment room.

== In popular culture ==
The Tamil film Kedi Billa Killadi Ranga was extensively shot at the station.
