= Golden Rock Shandy =

- Location: Golden Rock, Tiruchirappalli, Tamil Nadu, India
- Coordinates: 10.7865°N 78.7272°E
- Opened: 1926; 100 years ago
- Developer: British Raj
- Parking: Mixed

Golden Rock Shandy is a market square at Golden Rock, Tiruchirappalli in Tamil Nadu, India.

== Background ==
This weekly shandy was established in 1926 during the British regime to supply household essentials to residents of the colony who were mostly employees of railways and their families, living far away from the heart of Tiruchi city.

A farmers' market, it initially supplied vegetables only. As the population of the colony grew, the market expanded to include dry goods and wet goods, consumables, metalwares, pots, clothing, furnitures, meat, fish, poultry, livestock and electronic gadgets.

== Schedule ==
Initially, the market would be bustling every fortnight and on Sundays from dawn to dusk because the railway employees were paid salaries in cash twice in a month. When the fortnight payment system was scrapped and salaries were given in cash the 3rd day of each month, the market was conducted only on those days, abandoning the biweekly schedule. For the past few years, the market has been open only on Sundays, as the employees' salaries were credited directly into bank accounts.

== Legacy ==
The market square is visited by about 30,000 people from various parts of the district including BHEL Township, OFT, K. K. Nagar, Ponmalaipatti, Ariyamangalam, Kattur, Melakalkandarkottai, Kilakalkandarkottai and Kottapattu.

== See also ==
- Gandhi Market
- Koyambedu Wholesale Market Complex
