= Nilgiri Mountain Railway X class =

Compound locomotives used by Indian railway

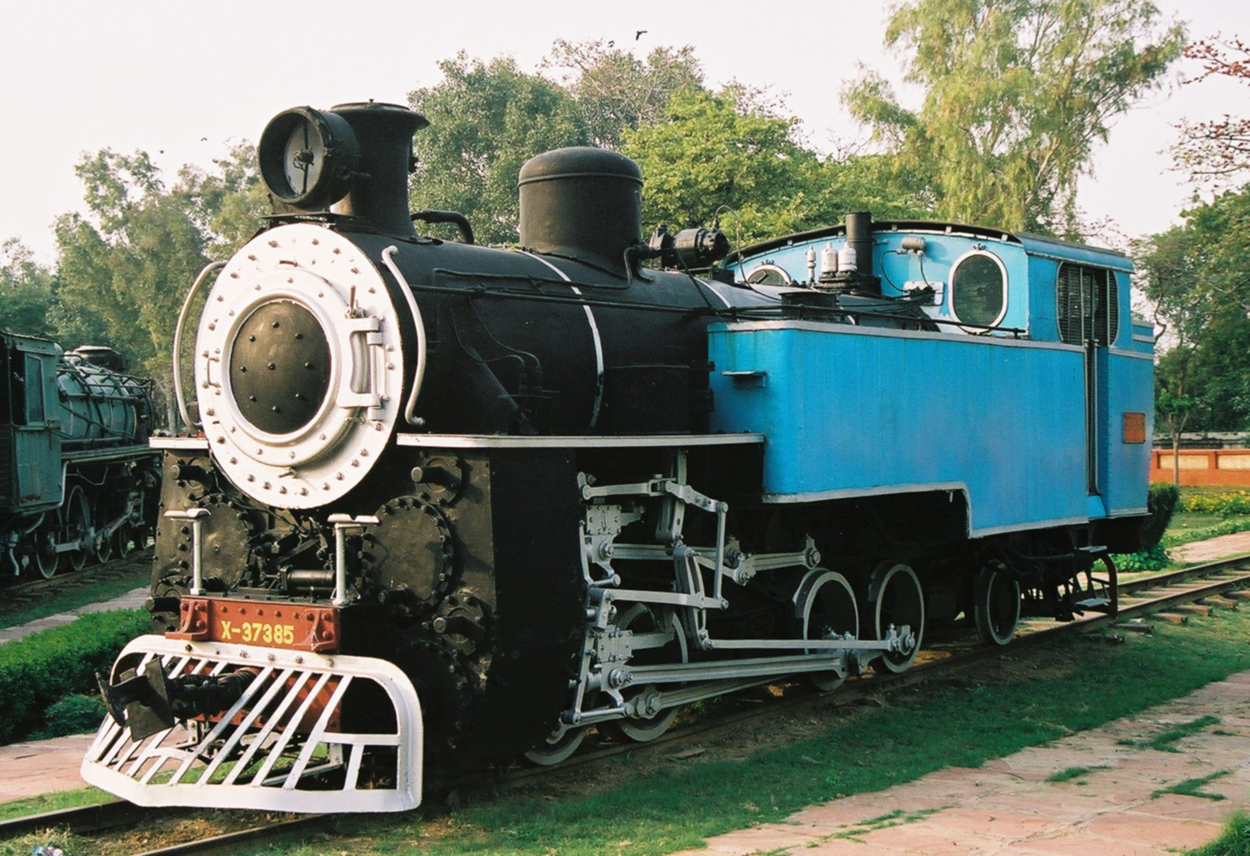
- Nilgiri Mountain Railway locomotive No. 37385, preserved at the Delhi Railway Museum
Type and origin
- Power type: Steam
- Builder: Swiss Locomotive & Machine Works, Winterthur, Switzerland (17); Golden Rock Railway Workshop, Golden Rock, Tiruchirappalli, India (6)
- Build date: 1914, 1920, 1925, 1952, 2011-2014, 2021-2022
- Total produced: 23
- Rebuilder: Ponmalai Goldenrock (G.O.C.)
Specifications
- Configuration
  - Whyte: 0-8-2RT
- Gauge: 1,000 mm (3 ft 3 3/8 in) metre gauge
- Driver dia.: 815 mm (32.09 in)
- Loco weight: 50 tons
- Fuel type: Coal or fuel oil
- Fuel capacity: 2011: 850 litres (190 imp gal; 220 US gal) of diesel and 2,250 litres (490 imp gal; 590 US gal) of fuel oil
- Cylinders: Four, outside, compound
- High-pressure cylinder: Adhesion: 450 mm × 410 mm (17.72 in × 16.14 in)
- Low-pressure cylinder: Rack: 450 mm × 430 mm (17.72 in × 16.93 in)
- Valve gear: Walschaerts
Performance figures
- Maximum speed: Adhesion: 30 km/h (19 mph); Rack: 15 km/h (9 mph)
- Power output: 900 hp (671 kW)

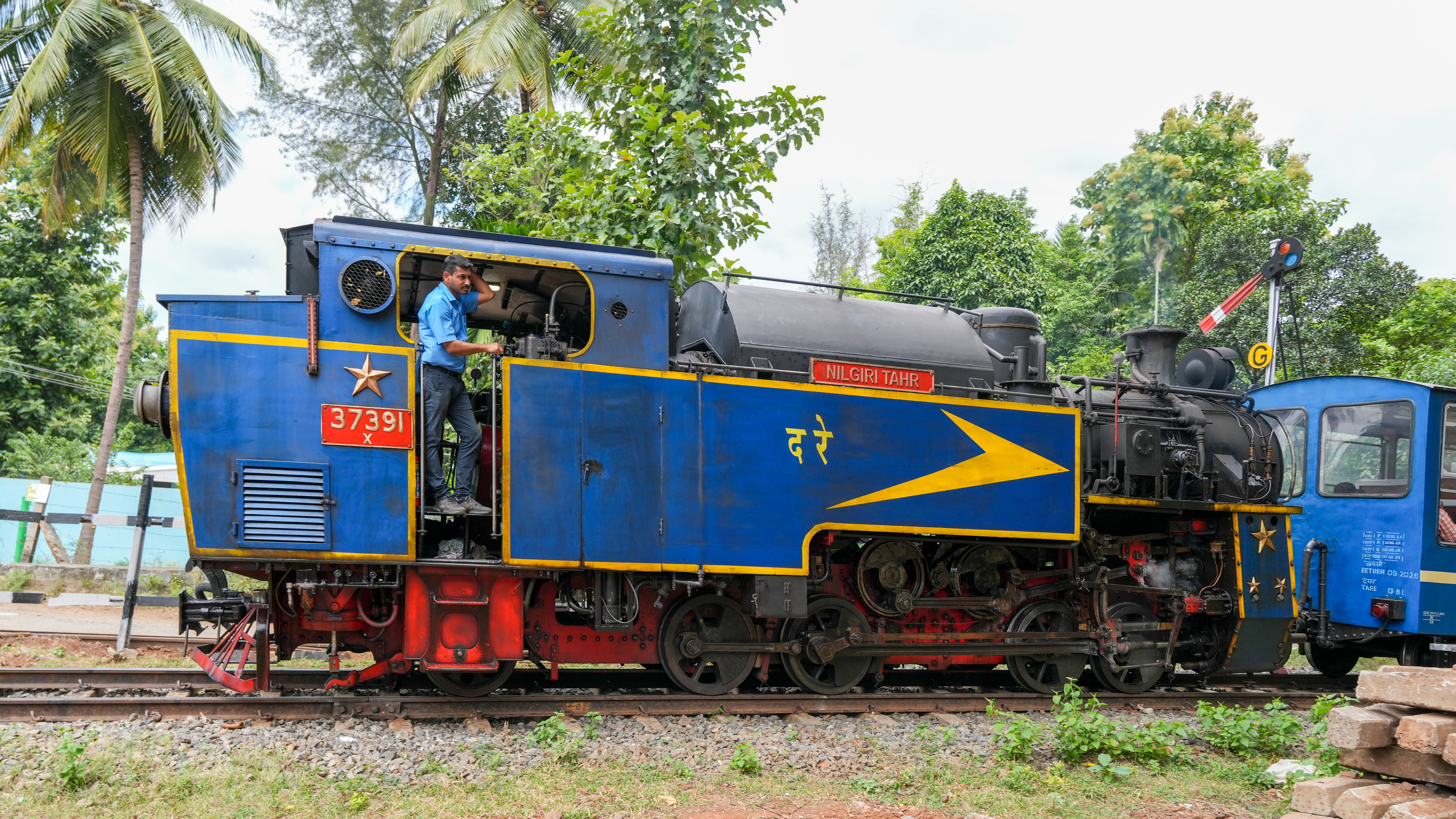
Locomotive 37391 near the Kalar level crossing, July 2025

The X class is a metre gauge 0-8-2RT rack and pinion compound locomotive used by the Nilgiri Mountain Railway in the Nilgiri Hills of southern India. They are used on the 28-kilometre-long (17 mi) section between Coonoor and Mettupalayam, where the line reaches a gradient of 8%. The railway uses the Abt system on these steep sections. The locomotives have two high-pressure and two low-pressure cylinders, located outside of their frames. The low-pressure cylinders drive the rack gears, and are positioned above the two main high-pressure cylinders, which drive the main wheels.

This class of engine was acquired to replace the line's original Beyer, Peacock & Company 2-4-0RT rack locomotives, which were not powerful enough to handle the traffic. They were bought in two batches from the Swiss Locomotive & Machine Works, Winterthur, Switzerland. The first batch of twelve was delivered between 1914 and 1925, and the second batch of five was delivered in 1952. Four more members of the class were built in India between 2011 and 2014, and another two between 2021 and 2022.

== Class table ==
Table of orders and numbers
SLM Works Nos.	Year	Quantity	NMR No.	All India No.	Notes
Swiss Locomotive Works, Winterthur (SLM) orders
2456–2459, 2469–2470	1914	6	1–6	37384	ex- No.1 (Nos. 2–6 were scrapped off during the British Raj)
2734–2736, 2733	1920	4	7–10	37385–37388	All Retired
3000–3001	1925	2	11–12	37389–37390	Retired
4069–4073	1952	5	13–17	37391–37395	All (except 37391 & 37392) Retired
Golden Rock, Ponmalai (GOC) orders
n/a	2011 - 2014	4	18–21	37396–37399	Non-SLM, all oil-fired, rebuilt to run on high-speed diesel fuel instead of furnace oil.
n/a	2021 - 2022	2	22–23	37400–37401	37400 (coal-fired) and 37401 (High-speed diesel-fuelled), rolled out in August 2021 and September 2022 respectively.

== Preservation ==
Working	Class	Number	Location	Built	Zone	Builders	Build No	Name
Yes	X	37384 X 06	NMR Section	1918	SR	Swiss Locomotive & Machine Works, Winterthur		
No	X	37385 X 07	National Rail Museum	1920	RB	Swiss Locomotive & Machine Works, Winterthur		
No	X	37389 X 11	Coonoor Station	1920	SR	Swiss Locomotive & Machine Works, Winterthur		
No	X	37390 X 12	Coonoor Railway Station	1925	SR	Swiss Locomotive & Machine Works, Winterthur		
Yes	X	37391 X 13	NMR Section	1949	SR	Swiss Locomotive & Machine Works, Winterthur		
Yes	X	37392 X 14	NMR Section	1949	SR	Swiss Locomotive & Machine Works, Winterthur		
No	X	37393 X 15	Regional Rail Museum Chennai	1952	SR	Swiss Locomotive & Machine Works, Winterthur		
No	X	37395 X 17	Rail Museum Trichy	1952	SR	Swiss Locomotive & Machine Works, Winterthur		

== Conversion to oil ==
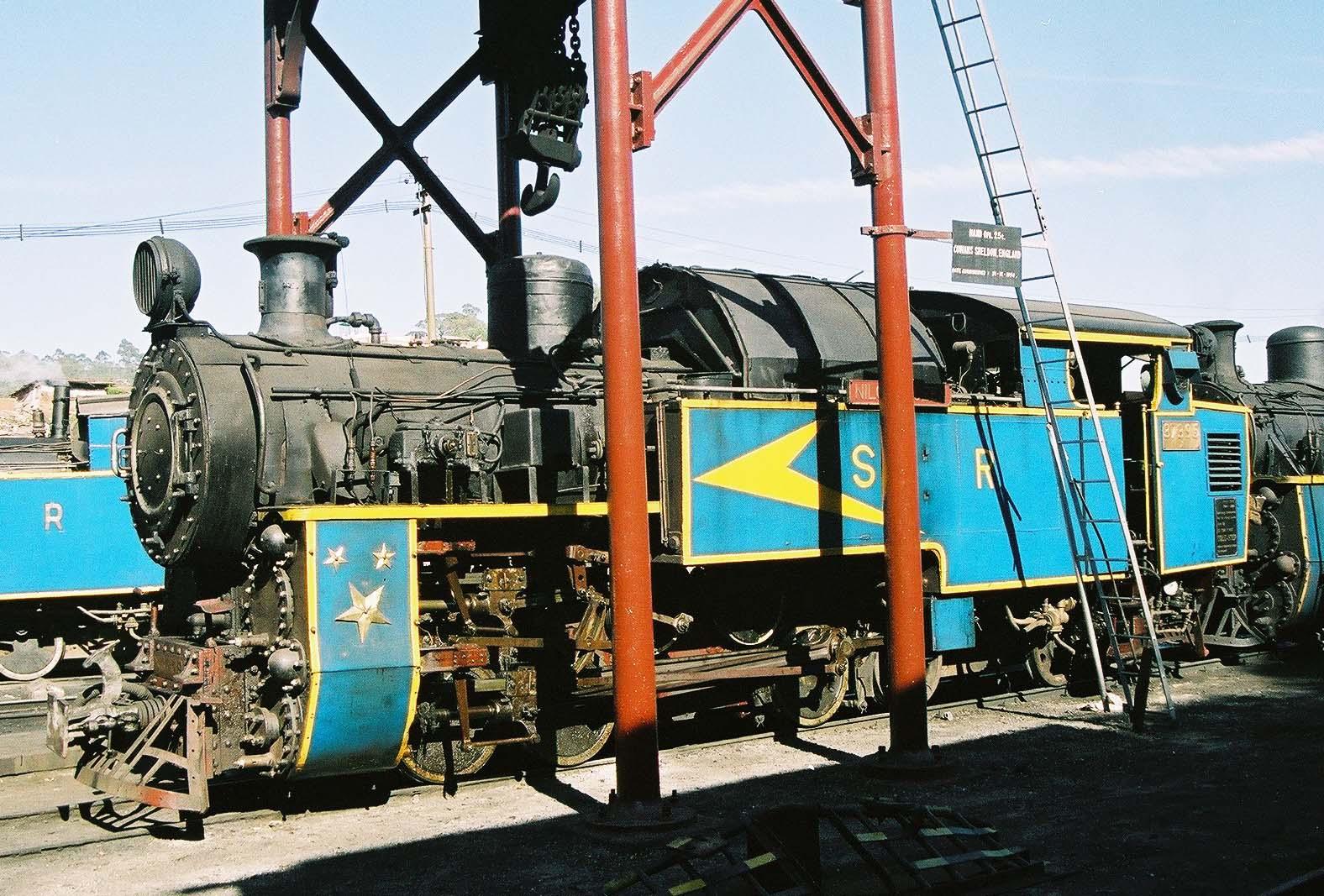
Locomotive No.37395 at Coonoor Shed, February 2005

The coal-fired No. 37395 was modified to fire oil in 2002, and another locomotive was similarly modified shortly afterwards. The railway intends to convert more locomotives to an oil-fired system, since they are less likely to spark forest fires and are easier to refuel. Unlike coal-fired engines, which require two firemen, only one fireman needs to travel with the driver of an oil-fired locomotive. Since April 2022, all oil-fired steam engines run on High-Speed Diesel (HSD), as it is less viscous and contains less sulfur, compared to furnace oil.

== New locomotives ==
To ease the load on existing X-class locomotives, four new oil-fired X Class steam locomotives to the same basic design were ordered. The first one (No. X 37396), named Neela Kurinji, arrived in February 2011 and entered service on March 24 of that year. The second (No. X 37397), Betta Queen, was rolled out at the Golden Rock Railway Workshop in February 2012, and entered service on the railway in March. The third (No. X 37398), also from the Golden Rock Workshop, Nilgiri Queen, entered service in March 2013. The fourth (No. X 37399), named Nilgiri Flycatcher was rolled out on March 5, 2014, to join the fleet after trials on the railway.

Under the order of the Central Government, the Golden Rock Workshop started the manufacturing of two X-Class steam engines, one coal-powered and one oil-powered, in 2020. However, due to COVID-19, they could not be finished on time. (Source:- Deccan Herald). X-37400, the coal-powered engine, was finally rolled out on August 25, 2021. The oil-fired locomotive, X-37401, rolled out on September 27, 2022. Both are currently in service.

== In fiction ==
Ashima, a character based on the X Class and voiced by Tina Desai, appears in the 2016 animated film Thomas & Friends: The Great Race. She also appears in the twenty-second series, the twenty-third series and the twenty-fourth series of Thomas & Friends.

== In Bollywood ==
The X-class steam engines were temporarily repainted and used in the music video for the song Chaiyya Chaiyya, sung by Sukhwinder Singh and Sapna Awasthi, with music composed by A. R. Rahman and lyrics by Gulzar. The video features Shah Rukh Khan and Malaika Arora dancing on the train, from the 1998 Mani Ratnam movie Dil Se. For the song, Ratnam spoke to NMR in regards to painting the engines greenish-black and the train rakes a brown color for five days, while the music video was shot.
