= Tiruchirappalli City Municipal Corporation =

Municipal corporation for Tiruchirappalli, India

Type
- Type: Municipal Corporation of the Tiruchirappalli

History
- Founded: 1 November 1866; 159 years ago

Leadership
- Mayor: M. Anbazhagan
- Deputy Mayor: G. Dhivya
- Special Officer & Commissioner: V. Saravanan, IAS
- District Collector: M. Pradeep Kumar, IAS

Structure
- Seats: 65
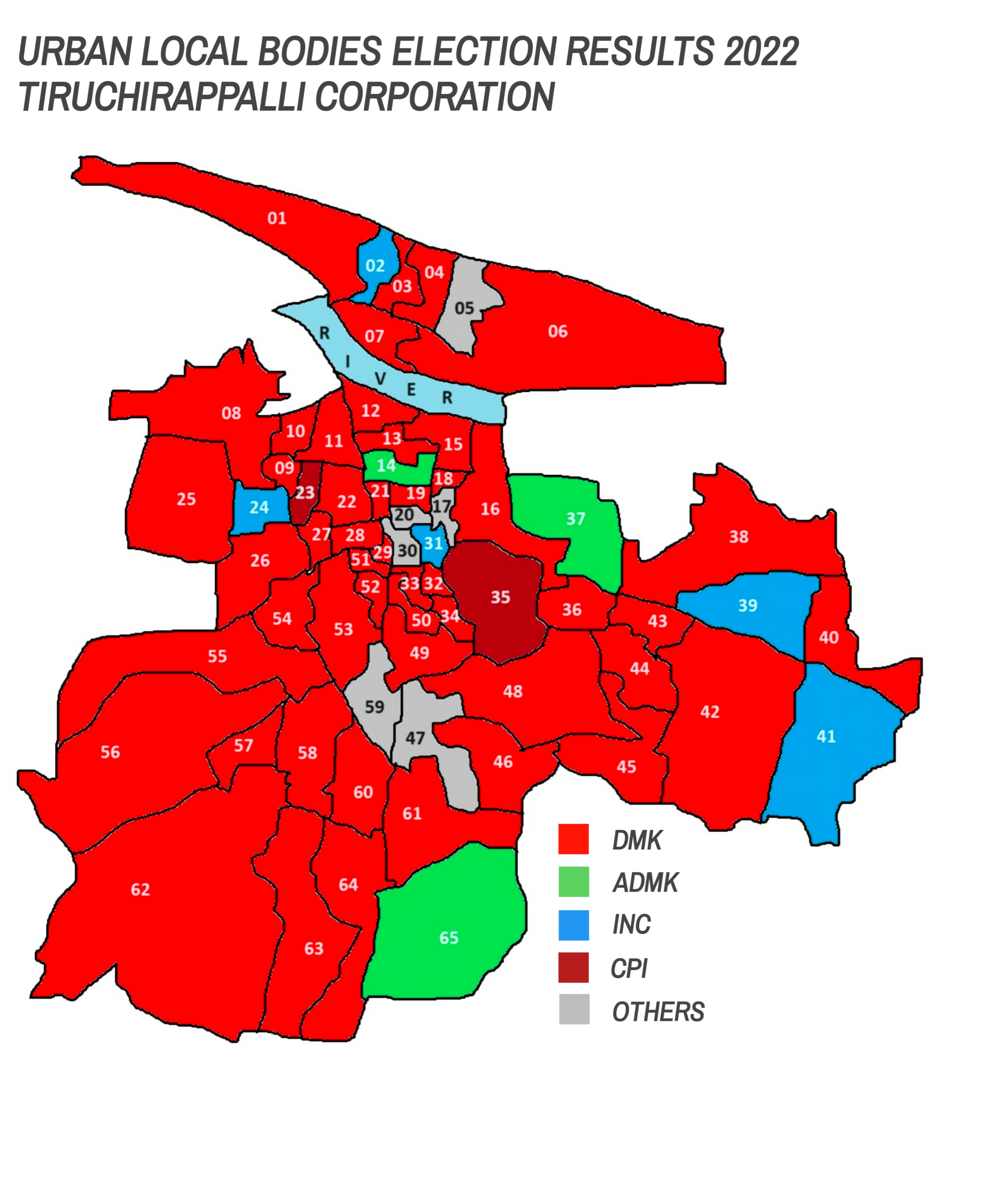
- Political groups: Government (51): SPA (51); DMK (49); CPI (1); CPI(M) (1); Opposition (14): TVK+ (5); INC (5); AIADMK+ (3); AIADMK (3); Others (6); Independent (6)

Elections
- Last election: 2022
- Next election: 2027

Meeting place
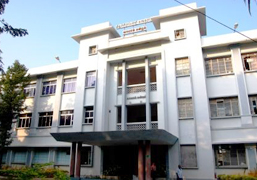
- Trichy municipal corporation building

Website
- trichycorporation.gov.in

The Tiruchirappalli City Municipal Corporation is the municipal corporation which looks after the city administration of Tiruchirappalli in Tamil Nadu, India. It consists of a legislative and an executive body. The legislative body is headed by the city mayor while the executive body is headed by a Chief Commissioner.

== History ==
The municipality of Tiruchirapalli was inaugurated by the Town Improvements Act 1865 on 1 November 1866 and included the civil station as well as the Trichinopoly Cantonment. The municipality originally consisted of two ex-officio and nine nominated members. Elections to the council were introduced in 1877 and the first chairman was elected in 1889. Elections were stopped in September 1895 and remained so until July 1897. The appointment of a municipal secretary was sanctioned by the Madras Government in 1898. Following the Montagu–Chelmsford Reforms, an Indian mayor was elected from 1921. The first Indian mayor was probably the Indian national congress independence activist, F. G. Natesa Iyer- who was also an officer with the South Indian Railway Company, the largest industrial enterprise, then in Trichinopoly. Indian independence activist P. Rathinavelu Thevar served as the Chairman of Trichinopoly municipality for a record five terms from 1924 to 1946. Thevar's tenure was, however, highly controversial and he was dismissed in 1934 for administrative irregularities. Thevar's rival T. S. S. Rajan accused him of instigating anti-Brahmin and anti-Muslim violence in the city.

A municipality of Srirangam was created in 1871 per the Town Improvements Act of 1865 following a decision not to include Srirangam within Trichinopoly municipality as it lay extremely far from the heart of Tiruchirappalli town. The municipality of Srirangam included most of Srirangam Island including Thiruvanaikaval. Golden Rock, with a population of 38,880 as per the 1971 census, was constituted a third-grade municipality on 1 October 1972 and upgraded to a II-Grade municipality on 5 October 1978.

There were demands to merge Tiruchi and Srirangam municipalities in September 1930 and October 1933. Rathinavelu Thevar submitted a memorandum to Lord Goschen requesting the upgrading of Tiruchi to a municipal corporation and extending it up to Manachanallur. Tiruchirappalli was eventually designated municipal corporation in 1994 through the merger of Srirangam and Golden Rock municipalities as per the Tiruchirapalli City Municipal Corporation Act 1994. The municipal corporation currently covers an area of 164.70 km^{2} and comprises 65 wards and 4 administrative zones: Srirangam, Ariyamangalam, Golden Rock and Abhishekapuram.

== Structure ==
The Tiruchirappalli City Municipal Corporation Council, the legislative body, comprises 100 councillors elected from each of the 65 wards and is headed by the Worshipful Mayor assisted by a Deputy Mayor. The executive wing is made up of seven departments: general administration, revenue, town planning, engineering, public health, information technology and personnel and is headed by a City Commissioner. The Commissioner is assisted by a city engineer, a city health officer, two executive engineers for the east and west sections, and Assistant Commissioners for personnel, accounts and revenue departments, a public relations officer, and an Assistant Commissioner for each of the four zones.

=== Divisions ===
The civic administration of the city is divided into four zones - Abhishekapuram, Ariyamangalam, Golden Rock and Srirangam. The engineering department, however, is divided into two zones - East and West. The zones and the wards which come under each of them have been listed below.

Zone	Wards	Total number of wards	Assistant Commissioner-in-charge
Abhishekapuram	75 - 100	25	P. Subramaniam (i/c)
Ariyamangalam	26-50	25	K.Padmavathy
Golden Rock	51-75	25	M. Dhayanithi
Srirangam	1-25	25	A. Akbar Ali

== Functions ==
Water supply is provided by the Tiruchirappalli Municipal Corporation. Of the six headworks from which the city gets its water supply, four are maintained by the municipal corporation and the rest by other agencies. Apart from the Gandhi market, Central Bus terminus and the Chathiram bus terminus, solid waste management in the city is handled by the corporation. About 400 tonnes of solid waste are released from city every year. The principal garbage dumping ground is at Ariyamangalam. Recently, the Tiruchirappalli city corporation has gone in for scientific closure of the garbage dump and its replacement with a sewage treatment plant. Waste water management in the Trichy-Srirangam under ground drainage (UGD) areas are handled by the Tamil Nadu Water Supply and Drainage Board (TWAD) and in other areas by the Tiruchirappalli Municipal Corporation. The high toxicity of the waste water released by the Trichy Distilleries and Chemicals Limited (TDCL) is a major cause of concern for the corporation. The corporation's annual expenditure for the year 2010-11 is estimated to be Rs. 155.94 crores. The corporation also maintains public parks in Tiruchirappalli city, notable among them being the P. T. Rajan Park, Chinnaswamy Park, Lourdusamy Park, Raja Park, Parangiri Velusamy Park and Ibrahim Park.

== List of mayors ==
The first elections for the post of mayor were held in 1996, two years after Tiruchirappalli's upgradation to a municipal corporation.

- Punithavalli Palaniyandi (25.10.1996–10.02.2001)
- Emily Richard (Mayor Incharge) (11.02.2001-24.10.2001)
- Charubala Tondaiman (25.10.2001–24.10.2006)
- Charubala Tondaiman (25.10.2006–02.06.2009)
- S. Sujatha (03.06.2009–24.10.2011)
- A. Jaya (25.10.2011–24.10.2016)
- M. Anbalagan (04.03.2022–Present)

== List of Commissioners ==
- 1 Thiru. S.Ramaiah, B.A 01.06.1994 to 05.10.1994
- 2 Thiru. Swaran Singh, I.A.S 05.10.1994 to 10.12.1995
- 3 T. Subramanian 10.12.1995 to 02.01.1996
- 4 M. Abdullahsha, I.A.S 03.01.1996 to 29.05.1996
- 5 A.J. MD.Mirza, B.E 30.05.1996 to 20.06.1996
- 6 Apurva varma, I.A.S 21.06.1996 to 19.02.1997
- 7 G. Pitchai, B.Sc 20.02.1997 to 20.08.1997
- 8 P. Muthu Veeran, M.Sc 21.08.1997 to 10.06.2001
- 9 S. Karuthiah Pandian, I.A.S 11.06.2001 to 20.06.2002
- 10 R. Venkatesan, I.A.S 27.06.2002 to 19.02.2003
- 11 Anand Patil, I.A.S 16.03.2003 to 01.06.2004
- 12 Harmander Singh, I.A.S 19.07.2004 to 19.06.2006
- 13 S. Rajamohammed, B.E 19.06.2006 to 22.06.2006
- 14 B. Balachandran, M.Sc 22.06.2006 to 18.09.2007
- 15 T.T. Balsamy, M.A 19.09.2007 to 31.07.2011
- 16 K. Veera Raghava Rao, I.A.S 01.08.2011 to 01.03.2012
- 17 K. R. Selvaraj, M.Sc 05.03.2012 to 26.05.2012
- 18 V.P.Thandapani, B.Sc., M.A.,(D.P.P.Tech) PGDUM 27.05.2012 to 07.01.2015
- 19 M.Vijaya Lakshmi, B.Sc., HDC, APGDUM 08.01.2015 to 22.03.2016
- 20 N.S.Prema, M.A., B.Ed., M.B.A., APGDUM., 23.03.2016 to 31.08.2016
- 21 N.Ravichandran, M.Sc., M.Ed 01.09.2016 to 04.11.2019
- 22 S.Sivasubramanian, B.Sc., B.L., 06.11.2019 to 13.07.2021
- 23 P.M.N.Mujibur Rahuman, B.Sc., 14.07.2021 to 02.06.2022
- 24 Dr.R.Vaithinathan, I.A.S., 02.06.2022 to 13.02.2024
- 25 V.Saravanan, I.A.S., 15.02.2024 to Till Date

== Elections ==
=== 2011 ===
Mayoral elections, 2011 : Tiruchirappalli
Party	Candidate	Votes	%	±%
AIADMK	A. Jaya	1,61,458	42.94	
DMK	J. Vijaya Jayaraj	1,09,043	29.00	
MDMK	S. Rohaiya Beevi	37,618	10.00	
DMDK	M. Chitra	30,471	8.10	
INC	S. Vijaya	15,387	4.09	
BJP	M. Girija	10,375	2.76	
Majority		52,415	13.94	
Turnout		3,76,034	63.68	
Registered electors		5,90,460		
AIADMK gain from INC		Swing	+15	

=== 2023 corporation elections ===
Party wise numbers of elected councillors (65 wards).

ADMK-42

DMK- 16

MDMK-3

INC-1

DMDK-1

Independent-2

== See also ==
- Municipal corporation (India)
- List of municipal corporations in India
- Municipal governance in India
