= Abhishekapuram =

Coordinates: 10.813178°N 78.677216°E

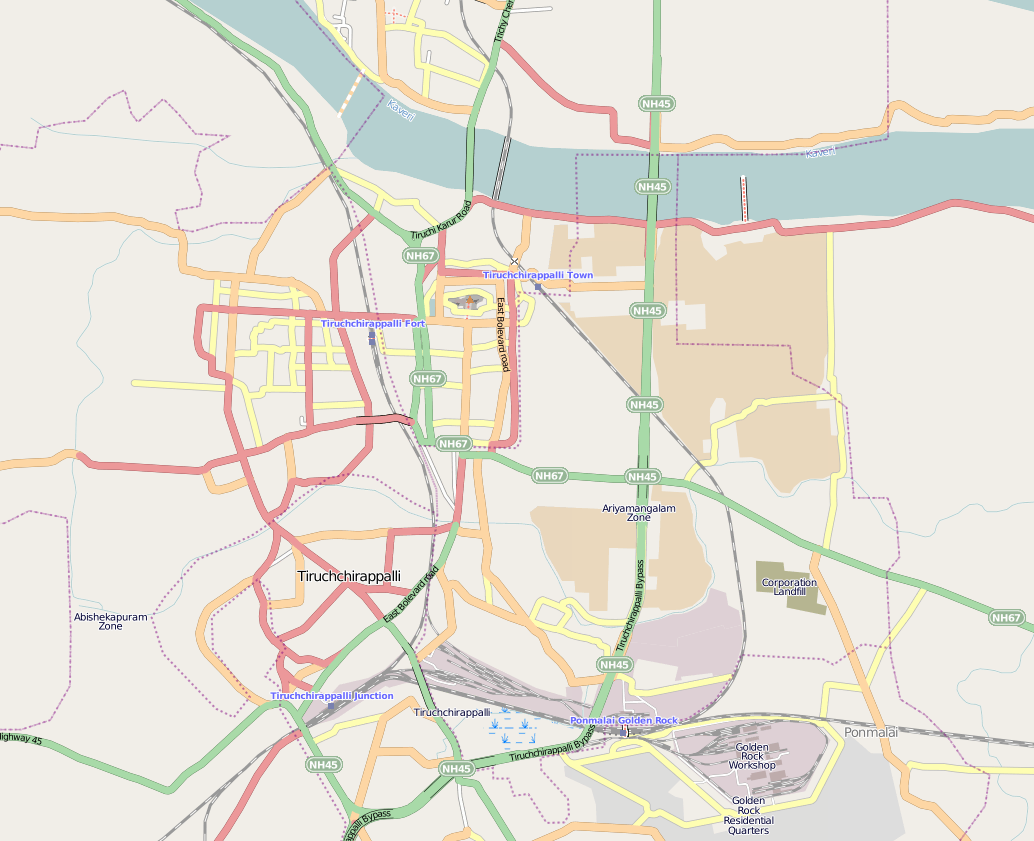
Abhishekapuram zone in Tiruchirappalli map

Abhishekapuram (Tamil: அபிஷேகபுரம்) is a suburb of the city of Tiruchirappalli in Tamil Nadu, India. It constitutes one of the four zones of the Tiruchirappalli Municipal Corporation.
