= Ariyamangalam =

Coordinates: 10.810296°N 78.721091°E

Ariyamangalam (Tamil: ௮ரியமங்கலம்) is one of the four zones of the Tiruchirappalli Municipal Corporation. One of SIDCO's two Tiruchirappalli-based industrial estates is located in Ariyamangalam. The estate extends over an area of 17.64 acres (71,400 m^{2}).
