= Gandhi Market =

- Location: Tharanallur, Tiruchirappalli, Tamil Nadu, India
- Coordinates: 10°49′22″N 78°41′48″E
- Address: Near Big Kammala Street
- Opened: 1868; 158 years ago
- Previous names: Fort Market
- Parking: Mixed

Gandhi Market officially called as Mahatma Gandhi Market, is a wholesale farmers' market in the city of Tiruchirappalli in Tamil Nadu, India.

== History ==
The construction of the market began in 1867, it was initially known as Fort Market, and was completed in 1868. It underwent expansion in 1927 when P. Rathinavelu Thevar served as the mayor of Tiruchirappalli. During this period, the market was renamed Mahatma Gandhi Market in honor of Mahatma Gandhi. Rathinavelu Thevar is said to have invited Gandhi to lay the foundation stone for the newly expanded market. A stone tablet in Tamil at the site reads, "Gandhi Market opened by Mahatma Gandhi in the Puratassi month, Prabhava year".

== See also ==
- Golden Rock Shandy
- Koyambedu Wholesale Market Complex
