= A. Jaya =

Indian politician

A. Jaya is an Indian politician and incumbent Mayor of Tiruchirappalli Municipal Corporation. She represents All India Anna Dravida Munnetra Kazhagam party.
