= Kilakalkandarkottai =

- village
- Country: India
- State: Tamil Nadu
- District: Tiruchirappalli

Government
  - Type: Panchayati raj (India)
  - Body: Gram panchayat

Population (2001)
  - Total: 1,472

Languages
  - Official: Tamil
- Time zone: UTC+5:30 (IST)

Kilakalkandarkottai is a neighbourhood of the city of Tiruchirappalli in Tamil Nadu, India. It is situated in the heart of the city.

== Demographics ==
As per the 2001 census, Kilakalkandarkottai had a population of 1,472 with 740 males and 732 females. The sex ratio was 989 and the literacy rate, 87.01.
