= Tiruchchirappalli Junction railway station =

Railway station in Tamil Nadu, India

Tiruchchirappalli Junction
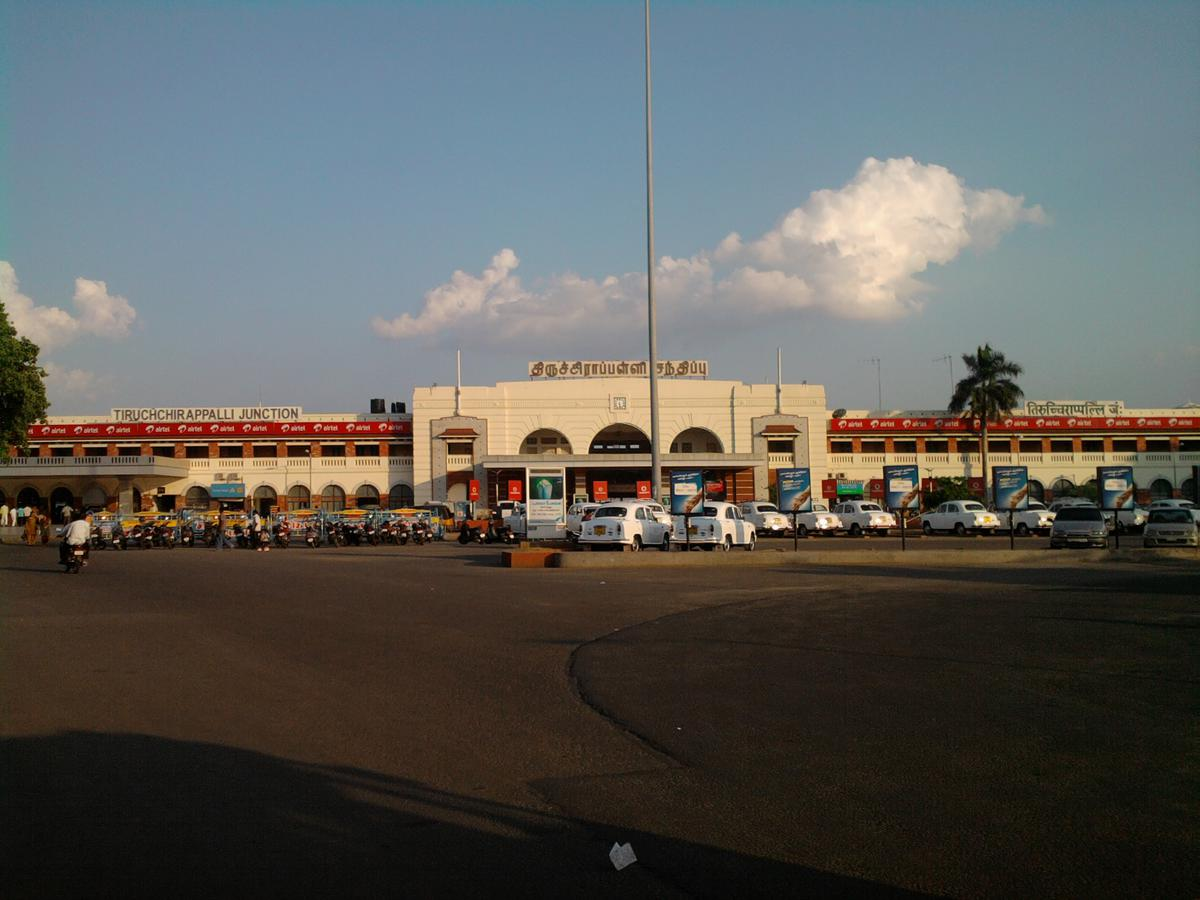
- Entrance of Tiruchchirappalli Junction Railway Station

General information
- Other names: Tiruchi/ Trichinopoly Junction, trichy junction
- Location: Rockins Road, Tiruchirapalli district. Tamil Nadu. PIN – 620001; India
- Coordinates: 10.7942°N 78.6854°E
- Elevation: 95.05 metres (311.8 ft)
- System: Indian Railways station
- Owner: Indian Railways
- Operator: Southern Railway zone
- Lines: Chord Line; Trichy–Thanjavur–Kumbakonam main line Erode–Karur–Trichy line Trichy–Madurai line Trichy-Manamadurai line
- Platforms: 9 Side platforms
- Tracks: 17
- Connections: Bus, Taxi, Auto Rikshaw, OLA Point

Construction
- Structure type: At-Grade (Indo-Gothic)
- Parking: Yes
- Cycle facilities: Yes
- Accessible: Disabled access

Other information
- Status: Active
- Station code: TPJ
- Zone(s): Southern Railway zone
- Division(s): Tiruchirappalli

History
- Opened: 1859; 167 years ago
- Electrified: 25 kV AC 50 Hz
- Former names: Old Madras Railway Station

Passengers
- 1,50,000 per day

Services
Preceding station	Indian Railways	Following station		
Golden Rock towards	Southern Railway zone	Kumaramangalam towards		
Golden Rock towards	Southern Railway zone	Kumaramangalam towards	Tiruchirappalli Palakkarai towards	Punggudi towards
Track layout
Location
- Interactive map

Tiruchchirappalli Junction railway station (also known as Trichy Junction railway station)(station code: TPJ) is an NSG–2 category Indian railway station in Tiruchirappalli railway division of Southern Railway zone. It is a junction station in Tiruchirappalli of the Indian state of Tamil Nadu. It is the only railway station to host diesel–electric multiple unit (DEMU) shed. Tiruchirappalli Junction is the second largest railway station in Tamil Nadu and one of the busiest railway stations in India.

== History ==
Name board of Tiruchirappalli Junction

The Great Southern of India, a railway company was established in 1853 with Tiruchirappalli as its headquarters. In 1859, the company constructed its first railway line that connected Tiruchirappalli with Nagapattinam. Presently, Tiruchirappalli is an important railway junction in Tamil Nadu and is a separate division of the Southern Railway.

Five rail lines branch separately from Trichy Junction:

- Towards north for Viluppuram Junction via Virudhachalam Junction
- Towards east for Viluppuram Junction via Thanjavur Junction
- Towards south-east for Karaikkudi Junction
- Towards south for Trivandrum Central via Dindigul Junction
- Towards west for Coimbatore Junction via Karur Junction

== Projects and developments ==
Golden Rock Railway Workshop and Diesel Loco Shed were involved in maintaining the bogies and locomotives respectively for passenger and freight operations. The station is also equipped with free Wi-Fi, retiring rooms, and AC lounge for passengers at 1st platform. On 1 August 2023, the eighth platform of the station was commissioned to reduce the waiting time for trains.

== Awards and achievements ==
As of August 2019, the average passenger footfall recorded at the station was 52,715 per day. The station has been awarded five star rating for electricity conservation. It was awarded ‘Gold’ (72 points) rating in March 2020 by the Confederation of Indian Industry (CII) for implementing various environment-friendly measures. It is the first and only station in Southern Railway and also fifth across Indian Railways to get "Gold" certification.

== Urban stations ==
- Tiruchirappalli Palakkarai (TPE)
- Tiruchirappalli Fort (TP)
- Golden Rock (GOC)
- Manjattidal (MCJ)
- Tiruverumbur (TRB)
- Tiruchirappalli Town (TPTN)
- Srirangam (SRGM)
- Pichchandarkovil (BXS)
- Uthamar kovil (UKV)
- mutharasanallur (MTNL)
- Vaaladi (VLDE)
- poongudi(PUG)

== Suburban stations ==
- Kumaramangalam (KRMG)
- Tondamanpatti (TOM)
- Mekkudi (MKY)
- Jiyapuram (JPM)
- Elamanur (EL)
- Perugamani (PGN)
- Pettaivaithalai (PLI)
- Pullambadi (PMB)
- Lalgudi (LLI)
- Kolatur (KLS)

== In popular culture ==
Tiruchchirappalli Junction is one of the most prominent landmarks in the city so has often featured in movies. The station has been used in some Indian novels and art productions over the years. Films and other programs filmed at the station, include:

- Vaaranam Aayiram (2008) (Tamil)
- Siva Manasula Sakthi (Tamil)
- Kalaga Thalaivan

== See also ==
- List of railway stations in India
- Railway Heritage Centre, Tiruchirappalli
