= Palakkarai =

- Neighbourhood
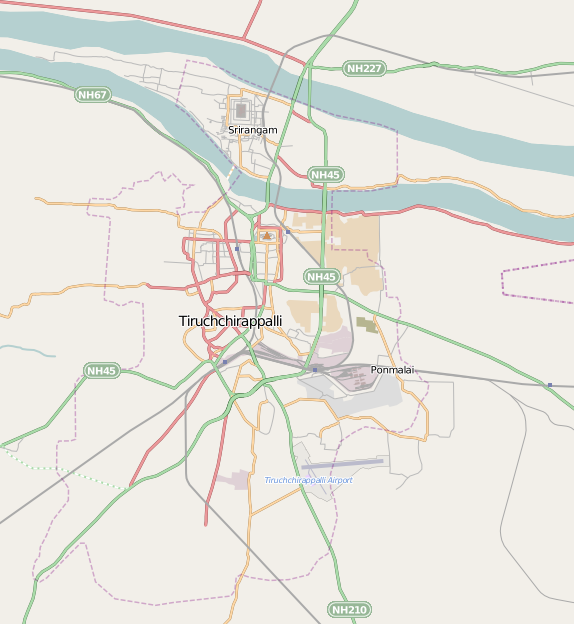
- Location within Tiruchirapalli
- Coordinates: 10°48′33″N 78°41′46″E
- Country: India
- State: Tamil Nadu
- Time zone: UTC+5.30 (IST)
- Area code: TN-81

Palakkarai is a neighbourhood of the Indian city of Tiruchirappalli, Tamil Nadu. It is the main residential and densely populated area in the city, including many slums. Many city buses ply through this area. A famous historical church is also located here, which is visited by many foreigners. It is situated in the southern part of the city. It is served by a railway station.

It has a railway station named " Trichy Palakkarai station" & big bazaar street & famous Vegetable Market named Gandhi Market.
