= P. Rathinavelu Thevar =

Indian politician

P. Ratnavelu Thevar
- Born: 1888
- Died: May 1948 (aged 59–60)
- Other name: P. R. Thevar

P. Rathinavelu Thevar (1888–1948), also known as P.R. Thevar, was an Indian politician who served as the Chairperson of the Trichinopoly Municipality from 1924 to 1946.

== Political and Social Contributions ==
Thevar entered politics as a member of the Justice Party, but, after visiting Mahatma Gandhi in Sabarmati Ashram in 1923, he became a Congressman. Thevar rose to national prominence when, as Municipal Chairman, he invited Mahatma Gandhi to lay the foundation for the expansion of Tiruchi Fort Market in 1927, renaming it Gandhi Market in defiance of the British regime.

In 1930, Thevar utilized the Municipal Council to protest against the arrest of Gandhiji, making it the first instance of such a protest. He introduced Subramaniya Bharati's patriotic songs as a subject in municipal schools, reflecting his dedication to promoting nationalistic values.

When Jawaharlal Nehru visited Tiruchi in 1936, he stayed at Thevar's house. Thevar actively participated in various agitations against British rule, including the Quit India Movement. Despite his significant contributions, he declined the post of Ambassador to Uganda offered by Nehru after Independence, citing ill health.

== Tenure as Municipal Chairman ==
Thevar served as Chairman of the Trichinopoly Municipality for five terms from 1924 to 1946 and was a member of the Madras Legislative Council from 1923 to 1946. During his tenure, he oversaw the construction of the Thevar Hall. Constructed in 1926 despite local opposition, it was originally named Municipal Public Hall and was later renamed after him. The hall is capable of seating around 600 people. It has hosted performances by notable stage personalities, including Prithiviraj Kapoor, Raj Kapoor, and M.K. Thiagaraja Bhagavathar, among others.

== Contributions to Sports ==
Thevar founded the Trichinopoly United Cricket Club (TUCC) in December 1914 to challenge the segregation policies of the British. He also conceived the idea of City vs. Districts cricket matches. Today, the P. R. Thevar Trophy under-16 inter-district tournament, conducted by the Tamil Nadu Cricket Association, honors his legacy.

Thevar regularly took the TUCC on cricketing tours of Ceylon. He hosted matches for any Ceylon team touring South India. In 1948, an ailing Thevar took the TUCC hockey and cricket teams to Ceylon. During that tour, he stayed with P. Saravanamuttu, the president of the Ceylon Cricket Board and the Tamil Union Club. Although he couldn't fulfil his promise to improve the Club's facilities due to his illness, his friend N.S. Krishnan took his drama troupe to Colombo to stage a play for the Tamil Union. The proceeds from the play, amounting to Rs. 28,000, helped develop the Tamil Union's Oval, making it the primary venue for international cricket matches in Ceylon for many years.

== Death ==
Afflicted by meningitis in May 1948 while in Sri Lanka, Thevar was flown back to Madras in an unconscious state and died at the General Hospital. He was cremated in Tiruchi on 10 June 1948.
