= Golden Rock, Tiruchirappalli =

Golden Rock
- Tiruchirappalli Corporation Zone
- Ponmalai
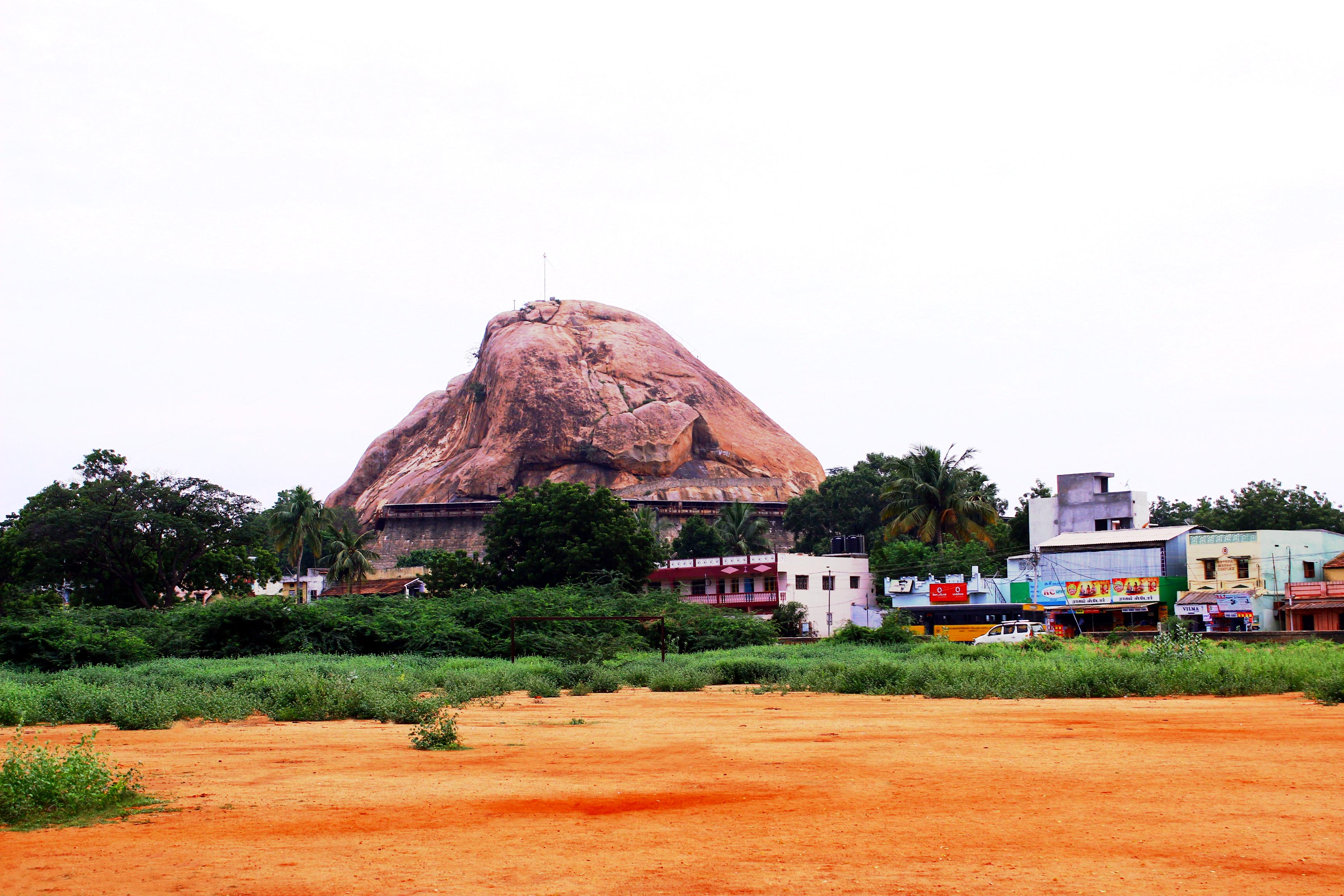
- Ponmalai
- Nickname: Ponmalai
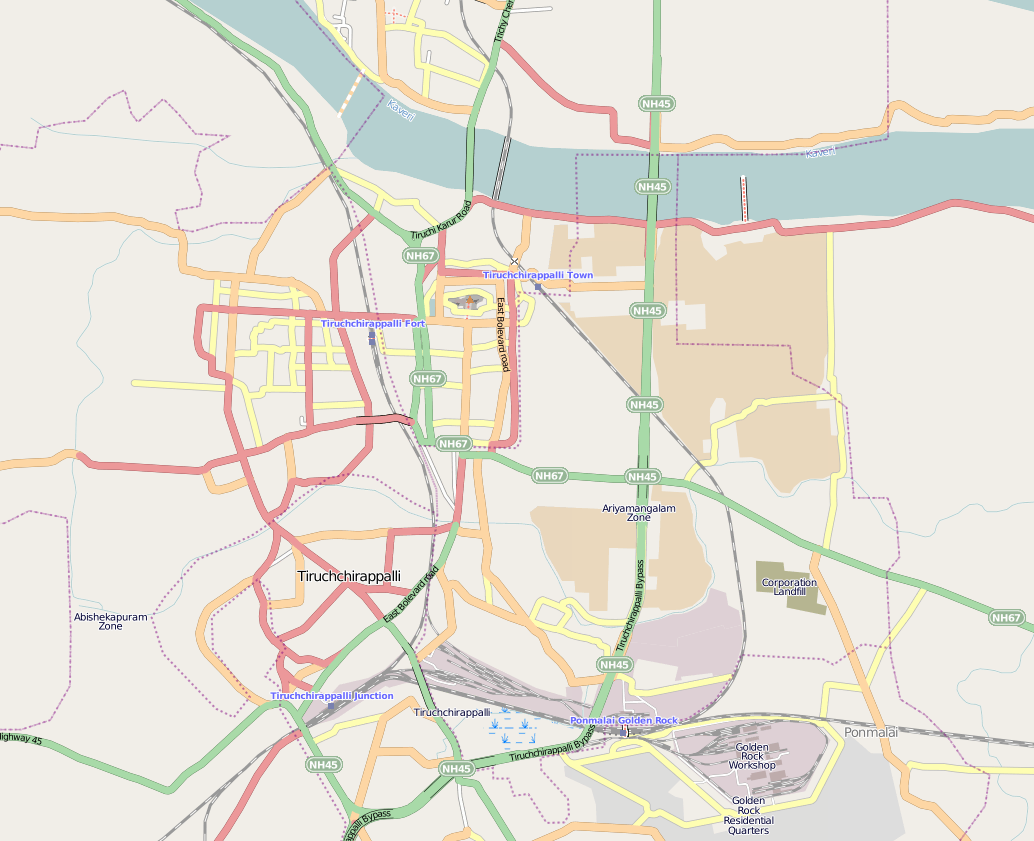
- Ponmalai in Tiruchirappalli

- Location within Tamil Nadu
- Coordinates: 10°47′08″N 78°43′24″E
- Country: India
- Region: Chola Nadu
- State: Tamil Nadu
- District: Tiruchirappalli district
- Municipal Corporation: Tiruchirappalli City Municipal Corporation

Government
  - Type: Councillor
  - Mayor: A. Jaya (AIADMK)
  - Deputy Mayor: M. Ashik Meera
  - Corporation Commissioner: V. P. Thandapani, IAS
  - District collector: Jayashree Muralidharan, IAS

Area
  - Total: 56.75 km^{2} (21.91 sq mi)

Languages
  - Official: Tamil
- Time zone: UTC+5:30 (IST)
- PIN: 620 004
- Telephone code: 0431
- Vehicle registration: TN-81
- Website: www.trichycorporation.gov.in

Golden Rock (Tamil: பொன்மலை, Ponmalai) is one of the four zones of Tiruchirappalli. The railway colony and railway workshop are nearby

== Demographics ==
The majority of the area is occupied by Golden Rock Railway Workshop and its residential colonies for its employees.

== Neighbourhoods ==
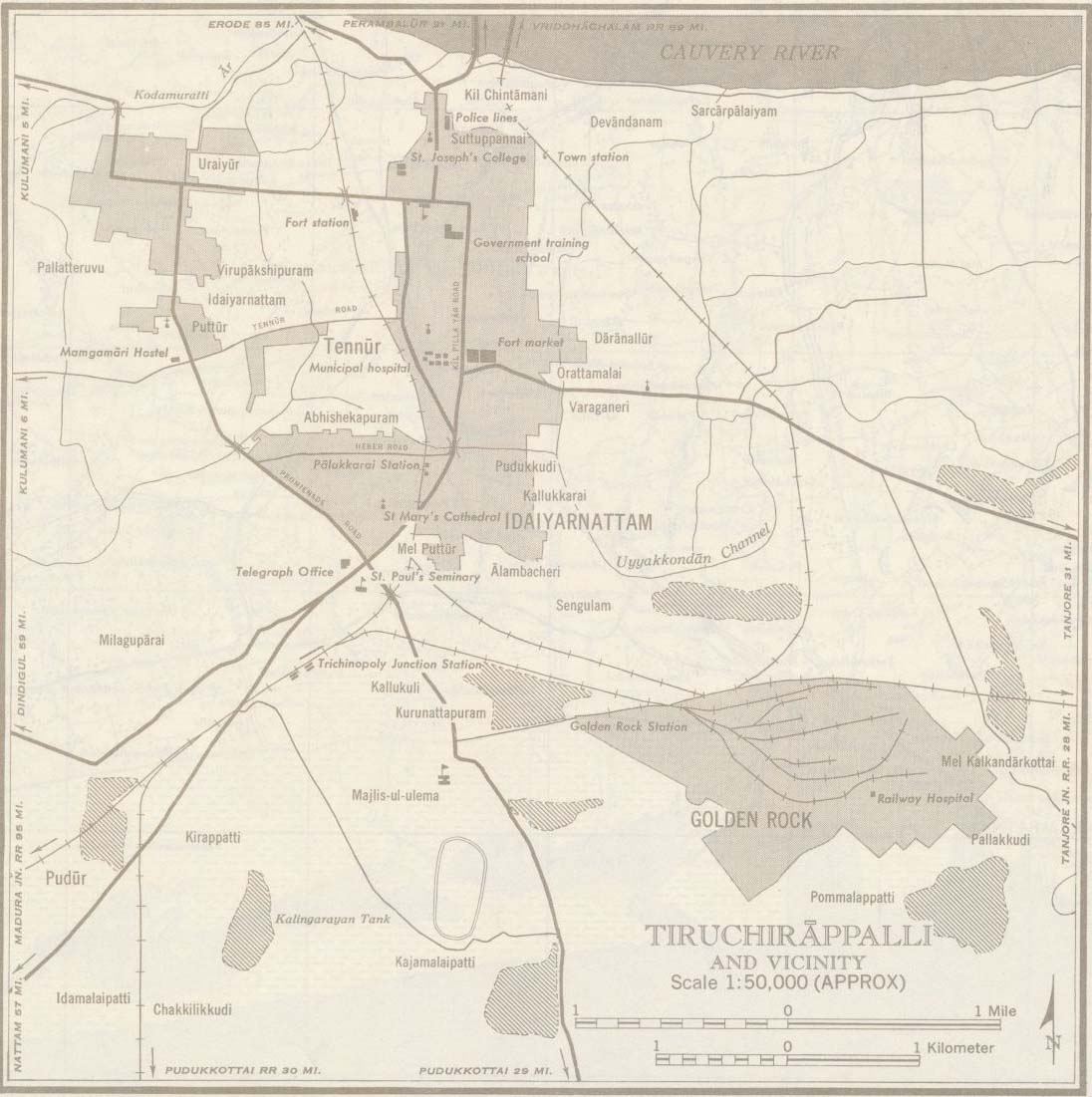
A 1955 Map of Tiruchirappalli showing the position of Golden Rock

Its neighborhoods are Kalkandar Kottai, Keezhakkurichy, Nathamaadipatti, Ponmalaipatti, Kottapattu, Subramaniyapuram, Sangiliandapuram, Senthaneerpuram, Ambikapuram, Thangeswari Nagar, Ex-servicemen colony. Most of the civilians of golden rock are S.Rly employees. It is well known for its shandy (market) held every Sunday, which was established during British rule in 1926.

== Transport ==
Nearest Railway Stations are Golden Rock (GOC), Manjatidal (MCJ) and Tiruchirappalli Junction (TPJ).

== Healthcare ==
It has one of the city's oldest hospital belonging to Indian Railways, Divisional Railway Hospital.

== See also ==
- Battle of Golden Rock
- Central Workshops
- Railway Mixed Higher Secondary School
