= Cheroot =

Cylindrical cigar without a filter

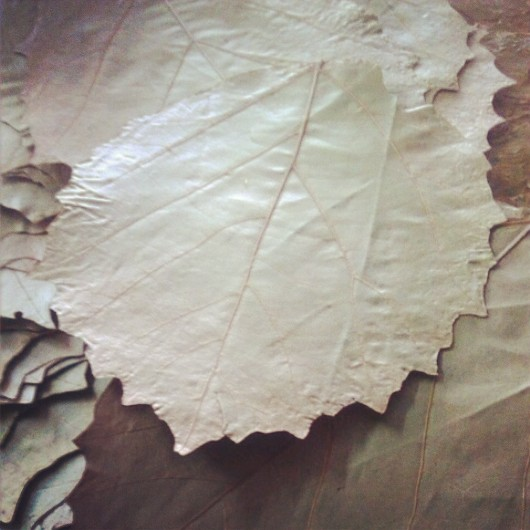
Cheroot-making leaves or cheroot leaves

The cheroot is a filterless cylindrical cigar with both ends clipped during manufacture. Since cheroots do not taper, they are inexpensive to roll mechanically, and their low cost makes them popular.

The word 'cheroot' probably comes via Portuguese charuto, originally from Tamil curuttu/churuttu/shuruttu (சுருட்டு), "roll of tobacco". This word could have been absorbed into the French language from Tamil during the 18th century, when the French were trying to stamp their presence in South India. The word could have then been absorbed into English from French. Cheroots are originated from the city of Tiruchirappalli in the South Indian state of Tamil Nadu. Cheroot are longer than another filter-less Indian-origin product, the beedi.

In Burmese, Myanmar, cheroots are commonly called "seboleik" ("light-tasting rolled tobacco"), while cigars made solely from tobacco leaves are termed "sebyinleik" (“strong-tasting rolled tobacco”).

== Asia ==
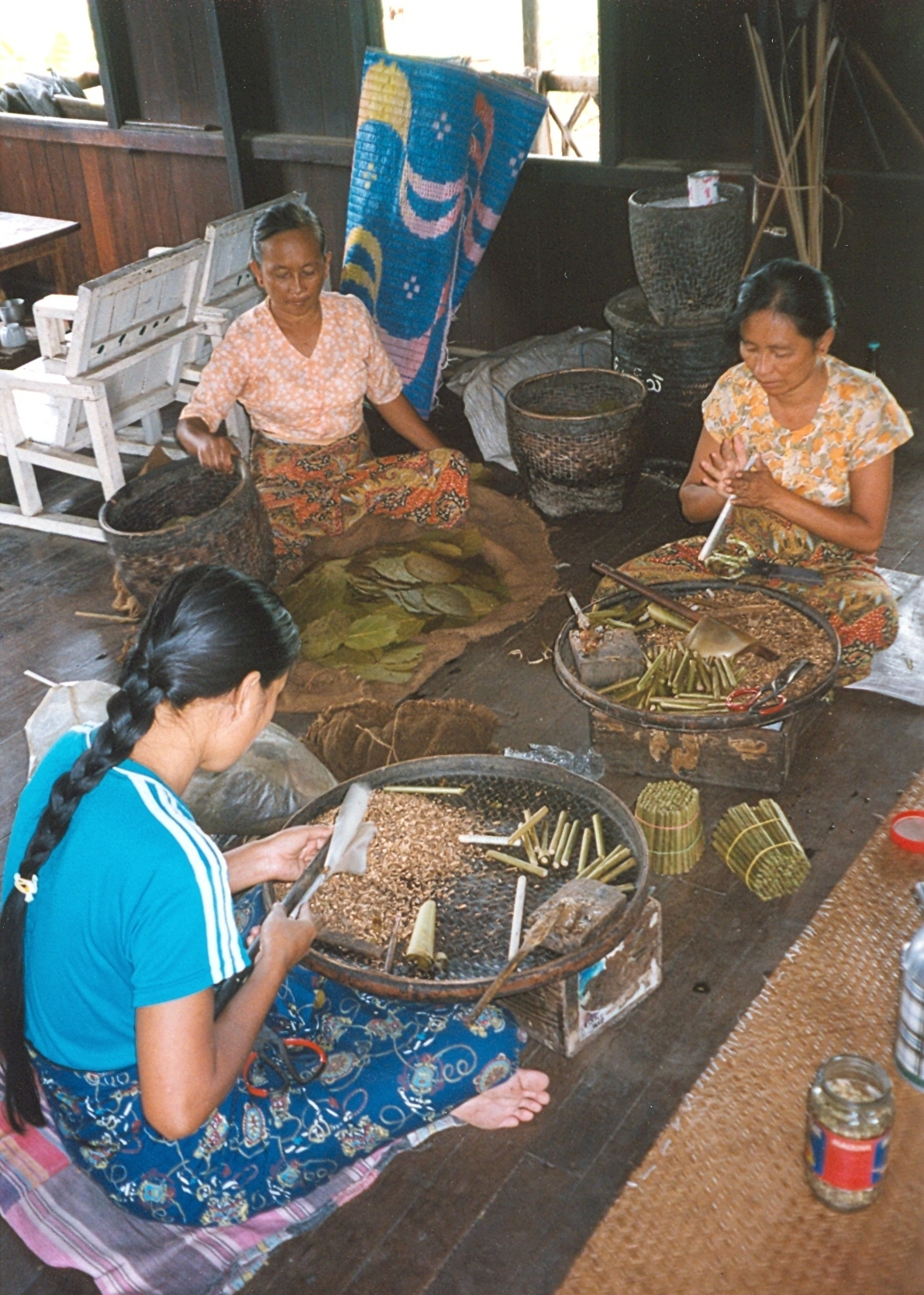
Preparation of cheroots, Inle Lake, Myanmar

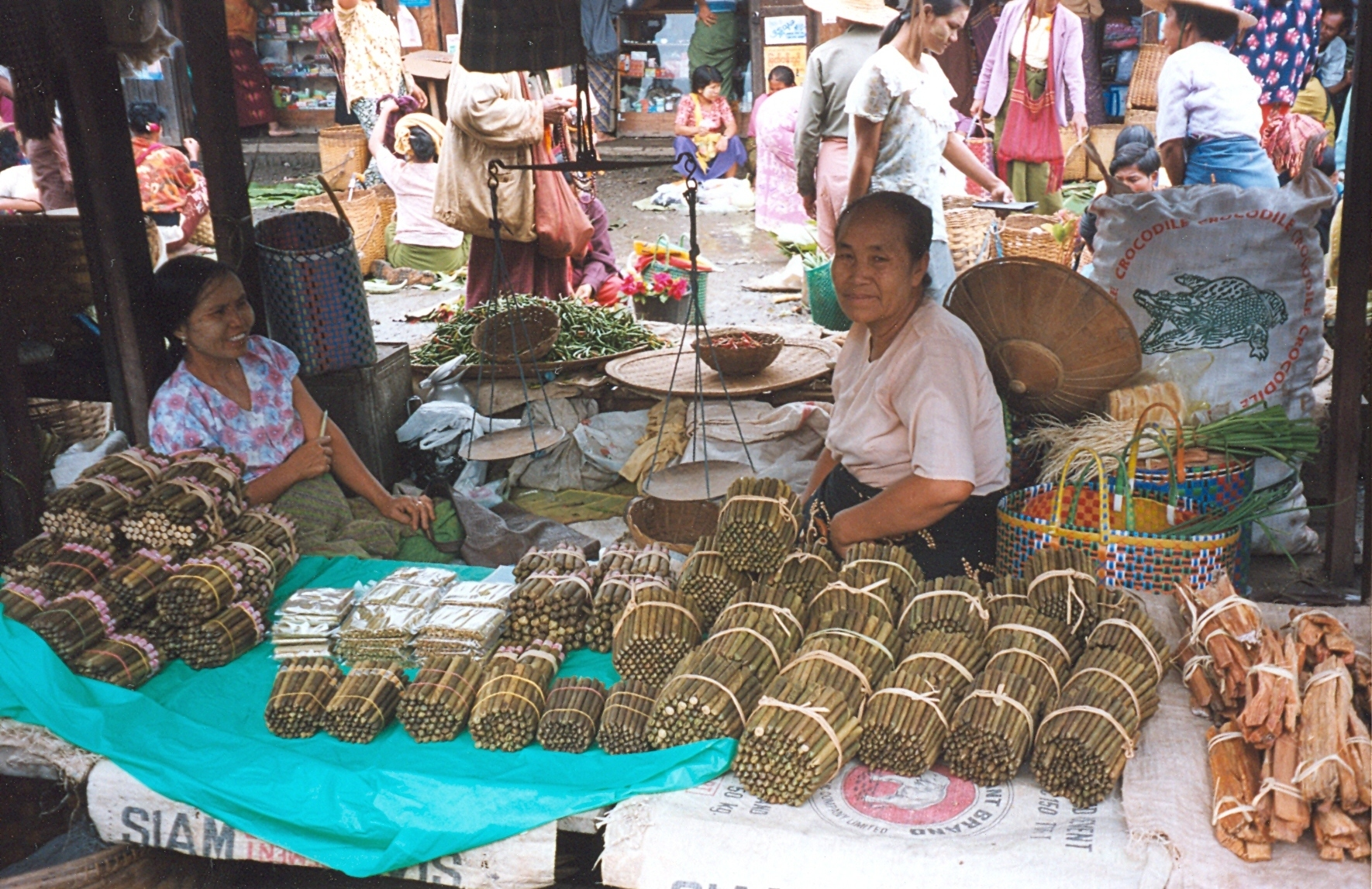
Cheroots sold in the market at Nyaungshwe, Myanmar

Cheroots are traditional in Myanmar and India, and consequently were popular among the British during the days of the British Empire. They are often associated with Myanmar in literature:

'Er petticoat was yaller an' 'er little cap was green,
An' 'er name was Supi-yaw-lat – jes' the same as Theebaw's Queen,
An' I seed her first a-smokin' of a whackin' white cheroot,
An' a-wastin' Christian kisses on an 'eathen idol's foot:

— Rudyard Kipling, (1892) "Mandalay", from Barrack-room Ballads

My brother was unlike us in some things, Sahib. He was fond of the sharab called 'Whisky' and of dogs; he drank smoke from the cheroot after the fashion of the Sahib-log and not from the hookah nor the bidi; he wore boots; he struck with the clenched fist when angered; and never did he squat down upon his heels nor sit cross-legged upon the ground. Yet he was true Pathan in many ways during his life, and he died as a Pathan should, concerning his honour (and a woman). Yea—and in his last fight, ere he was hanged, he killed more men with his long Khyber knife, single-handed against a mob, than ever did lone man before with cold steel in fair fight.

— Captain Percival Christopher Wren, I.A.R., 1912, Driftwood Spars

Apparently, cheroot smoking was also associated with resistance against tropical disease in India. Verrier Elwin wrote in a foreword (1957) to Leaves from the Jungle: Life in a Gond Village:

A final thing strikes me as I re-read the pages of the Diary that follows is that I seem to have spent much of my time falling ill. I attribute this to the fact that in those days I was a non-smoker. Since I took to the cheroot, I have not had a single attack of malaria, and my health improved enormously in later years."

— Leaves from the Jungle: Life in a Gond Village, Oxford University Press, 1992, p.xxix

Although a cheroot is defined as cylindrical, home-rolled cheroots in Myanmar are sometimes conical.

The World Bank Group reported that an estimated 2,500 cheroot-making businesses were in Myanmar, and are mainly located in Myin Gyan District in Mandalay Region.

== See also ==
- Beedi
- Cigar
