= Senthaneerpuram =

- Neighbourhood
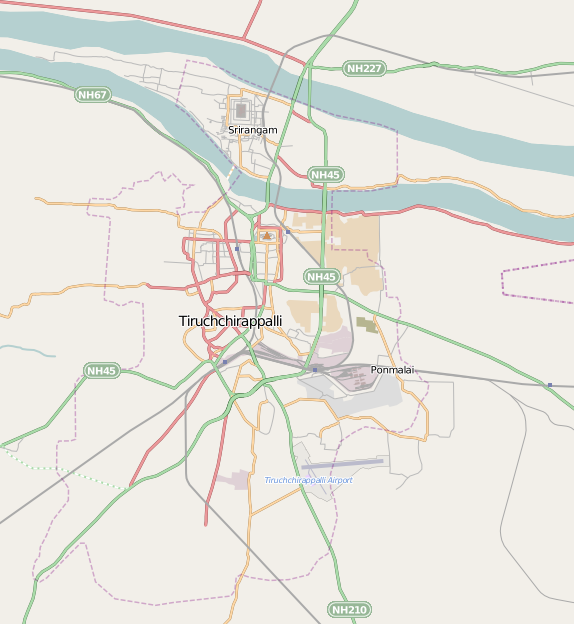
- Location within Tiruchirapalli
- Coordinates: 10°48′9″N 78°42′43″E
- Country: India
- State: Tamil Nadu
- Time zone: UTC+5.30 (IST)

Senthaneerpuram is an industrial neighbourhood in the city of Tiruchirappalli in Tamil Nadu, India. It forms a part of the Golden Rock zone of the Tiruchirappalli Municipal Corporation. The Trichy Distilleries and Chemicals Limited (TDCL) was established here in 1966. The regional office of The Hindu, Trichy is located here.
