= Golden Rock Railway Workshop =

Railway workshop in southern India

Coordinates: 10.790678°N 78.720496°E

Central Workshop, Golden Rock
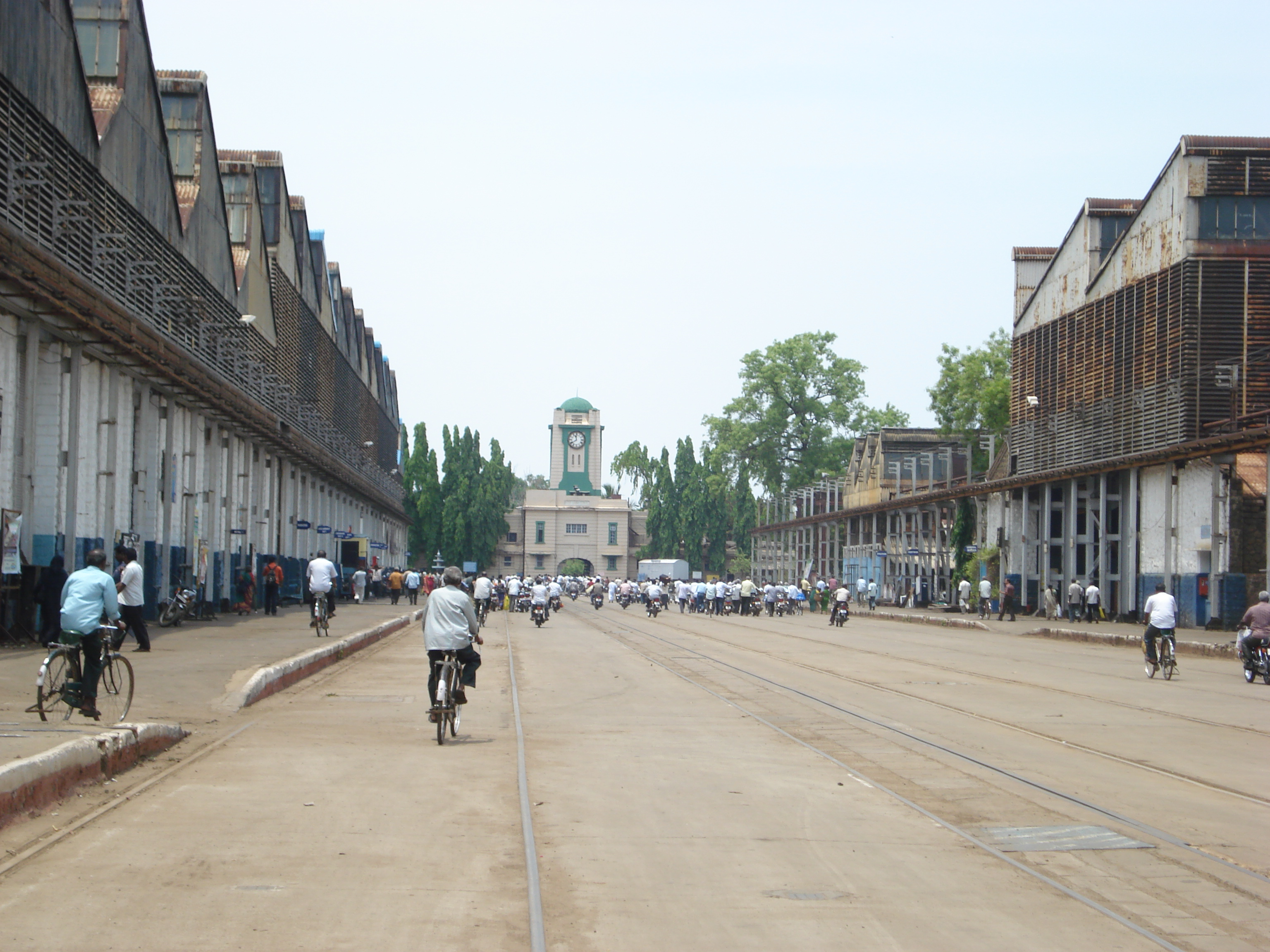
- The workshop's south entrance
- Built: 1928; 98 years ago
- Location: Golden Rock, Tiruchirappalli Tamil Nadu; Golden Rock, Tiruchirappalli
- Industry: Rail transport
- Products: Rolling stock
- Employees: ~6,000
- Architect: East India Company
- Area: 200 acres (81 ha)

The Golden Rock Railway Workshop (officially the Central Workshop, Golden Rock, abbreviated GOC), in Ponmalai (Golden Rock), Tiruchirappalli, Tamil Nadu, is one of three railway workshops serving Indian Railways' Southern Railway zone. The workshop is part of the railways' Mechanical Department. The other two Southern Railway workshops (Carriage Works and Loco Works) are in Perambur, Chennai. (Note: The Integral Coach Factory in Perambur, a production unit, is not a workshop; workshops primarily perform repair and maintenance work, not production. Due to changing requirements, however, many workshops (including Golden Rock) are now also used for production.)

== History ==
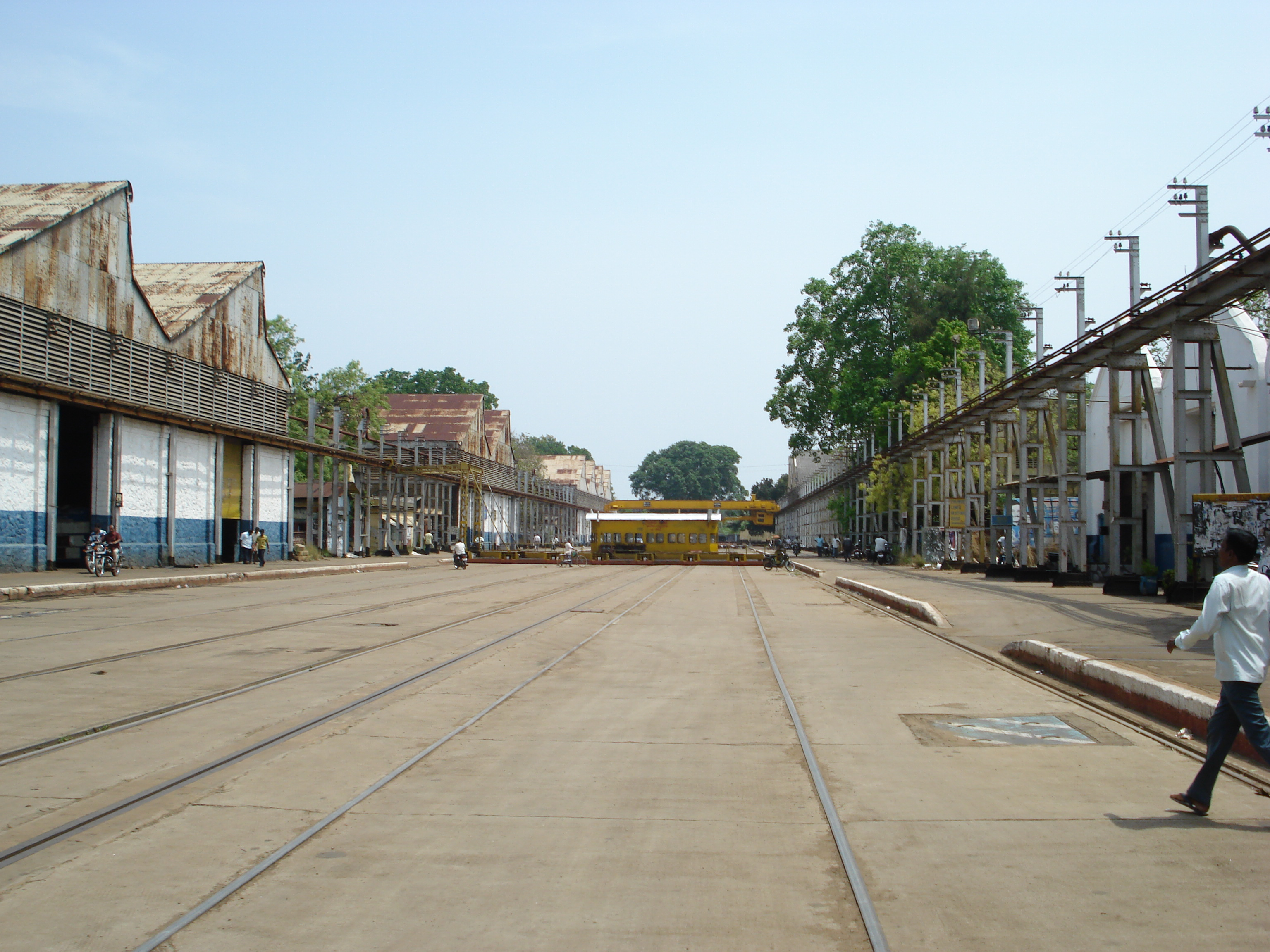
Branch shops on both sides of the north entrance, connected by a transfer table

This central workshop was set up in 1897 by South Indian Railways at Nagapattinam to maintain steam locomotives. South Indian Railways decided to move the workshop to Trichinopoly (present-day Tiruchirappalli) because of its better location. The foundation stone of the Tiruchchirappalli workshop was laid by Mrs. R.P. Munro on 20 December 1926, and work was completed in 1928.

The workshop had state-of-the-art facilities, including a powerhouse which generated electricity for the workshop and the colony. Golden Rock's railway colony was one of Tiruchirappalli's first locations with electric lighting. The workshop repaired Royal Air Force planes during World War II.

The workshop covers about 200 acres (81 ha), of which 26 acres (11 ha) is under cover. It has a 600-metre-long (660 yd), 80-foot-wide (24 m) transfer table.

In 2018, Golden Rock had 6,091 employees. The workshop primarily maintains coaches and diesel and heritage steam locomotives and manufactures wagons.

== Management ==
- Chief Workshop Manager (CWM): assisted by three junior administrative officers, four senior-scale officers and four junior-scale officers.
- Deputy Chief Mechanical Engineer/P: responsible for the manufacture, periodic overhaul (POH) and conversion of X-class Steam Locomotives (locomotives with a toothed cog rack and pinion system for the Nilgiri Mountain Railway). As part of the POH, the locomotive's original coal-fired boiler is converted to oil (without affecting its appearance) due to the difficulty of obtaining coal. The workshop has been ordered to manufacture four X class locomotives. The Deputy CME/P is also in charge of the foundry and the wheel, fabrication and smithy, machine and diesel-component shops.
- Deputy Chief Mechanical Engineer/Diesel: in charge of public-sector, diesel, steam and export locomotive POH and its allied shops
- Deputy Chief Mechanical Engineer/Carriage and Wagon: in charge of carriage POH and wagon manufacture and management representative for the ISO 9001 and ISO 14001 quality management systems
- Deputy Chief Electrical Engineer: in charge of electrical maintenance and train lighting
- Deputy Chief Material Manager: in charge of procuring and stocking raw material and spare parts
- Deputy Accounts and Financial Advisor
- Workshop Personnel Officer: implements recruitment, promotion, transfer, retirement and welfare measures, maintaining a relationship with the trade unions

== Business activities ==
=== Diesel locomotive maintenance ===
Diesel and electric locomotive POH began at Golden Rock in 1969 to accommodate SR and SCR, with a capacity of one locomotive every two months. Its capacity was increased to 10 locomotives per month in July 1990 to meet the needs of five railways: Southern, South Central, South Western, West Central and North Western Railways. The workshop's present capacity is 12 locomotives per month. In addition to locomotive overhaul, the diesel shop has the following support shops:

1. Engine-block reclamation shop
2. Cylinder-liner plating shop
3. Coil-manufacturing shop
4. Heavy electrical repair shop

=== Carriage maintenance ===
GOC performs the following carriage maintenance:

- Overhauling Nilgiri Mountain Railway and BG coaches
- Refurbishing interior furnishings as part of midlife rehabilitation
- Furnishing inspection cars
- Retrofitting stainless-steel floors
- Refurbishing toilets
- 12–18 month POH

The workshop also manufactures and converts Nilgiri Mountain Railway coaches and exports old MG coaches after maintenance and remodeling by RITES.

=== Wagon manufacturing ===
GOC, which began manufacturing wagons in 1962, has produced 34,901 wagons in 53 designs. The workshop produces container wagons for Container Corporation of India (CONCOR).

=== Production wing ===
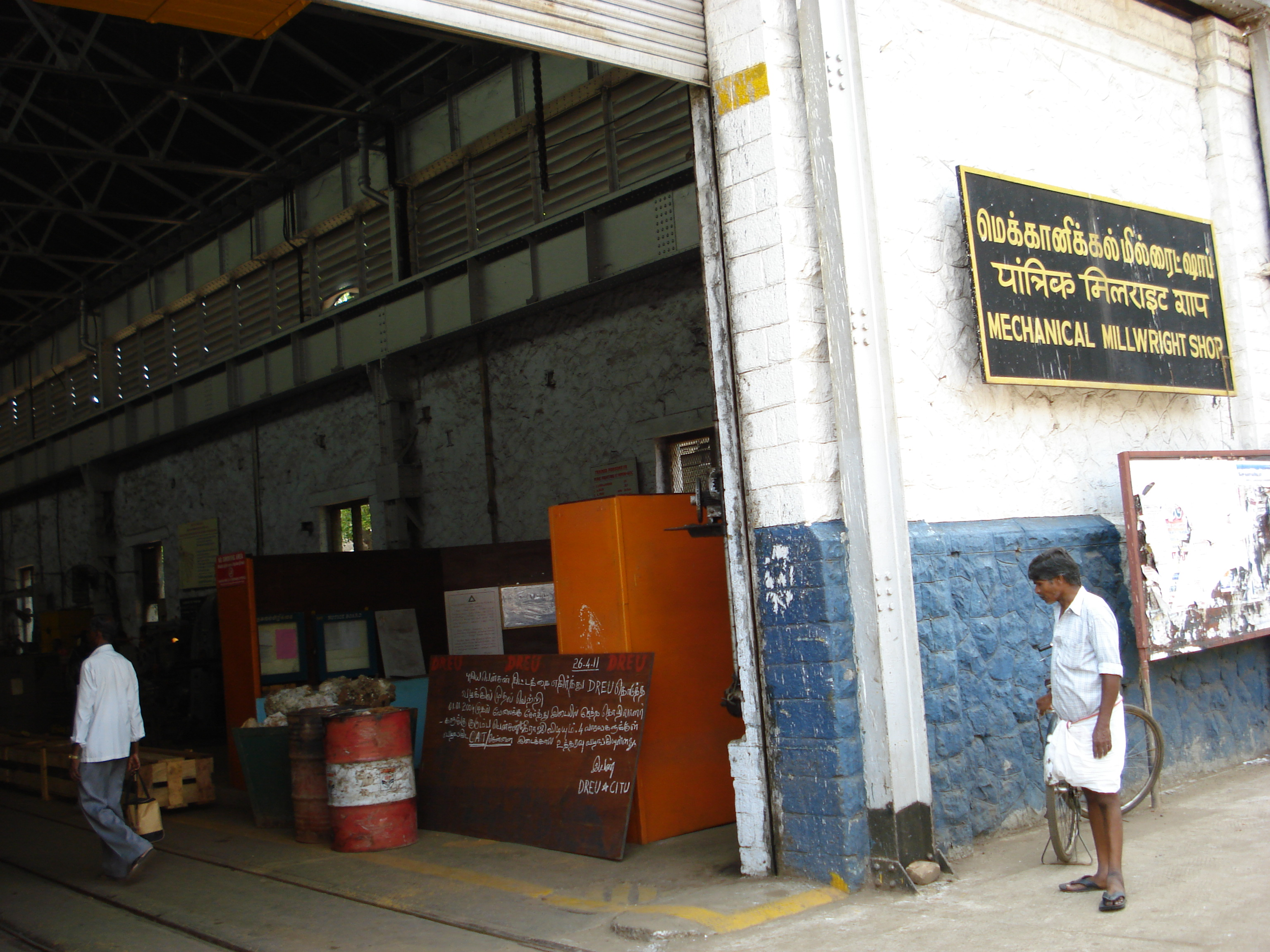
Mechanical Millwright Shop

The workshop's production wing focuses on manufacturing components required for locomotive and carriage maintenance and wagon manufacturing. It supplies wheels for rolling-stock maintenance and manufactures steam locomotives for the Nilgiri Mountain and Darjeeling Himalayan Railways. The wing includes a tool room and foundry, diesel component, machine, wheel, fabrication and smithy, erecting and mechanical millwright shops. The Mechanical Millwright Shop maintains machinery and equipment, including overhead cranes, material-handling equipment and other special-purpose machines. Over 1,200 pieces of machinery are installed at GOC.

In August 2021, an X-class coal-fired steam locomotive manufactured for the Nilgiri Mountain Railway (NMR) was dispatched by road to Mettupalayam for trials prior to operational deployment.

== Support activities ==
GOC uses the following for support activities:

- Material management
- Electrical plant maintenance
- Safety department
- Workshop training centre
- Computer centre
- Chemical and Metallurgical Laboratory

=== Material management ===
Golden Rock has three storage depots and a scrap-storage depot. Availability of material is 95 to 98 percent.

=== Safety department ===
GOC's safety department, in existence for 30 years, uses training, drills, shop-floor counseling, data updating and the scientific elimination of work-related hazards. The department displays posters and safety magazines highlighting safety procedures, and develops a rapport with workers through customised safety modules. It received three awards from the government of Tamil Nadu in 2005.

=== Training centre ===
The shop has a training centre, primarily to offer courses in accordance with the Apprenticeship Act 1961. Training varies from one to two years, depending on entrance qualifications and the trade being taught. The centre also offers need-based training for artisans and supervisors.

=== Computer centre ===
GOC has a fully equipped information system, required at the management and operational levels. It developed the Workshop Information System (WISE) in-house in 2001, implementing it the following year. Golden Rock assisted the Centre for Railway Information Systems in implementing WISE at 16 other railway workshops in 2004, and developed a Diesel Loco Maintenance Management Information System (DLMMIS).

== Welfare activities ==
=== Premature death assistance scheme ===
All employees contribute to (and are covered by) this social-security scheme, which gives ₹10,000 to the family of a deceased employee.

=== Crèche ===
A crèche, near the Armoury Gate entrance, cares for the children of workshop employees.

=== Canteen ===
A modern canteen, with a gas supply for steaming, caters to employees. Refreshments such as snacks, tea and coffee are supplied in work areas. The canteen has two dining halls, with a lunchtime capacity of 160. Tea and snacks are sold at nine booths.

=== Education ===
Schools were established for the children of GOC employees before India's independence. Although four schools and two kindergartens once existed in Golden Rock's railway colony, its declining population has left only a single school.

== Work ==
Golden Rock performs periodic overhauls (POH) and maintenance of diesel locomotives and the Darjeeling and Nilgiri narrow-gauge locomotives. It maintains, services and remodels discontinued diesel metre-gauge locomotives for export by RITES, and other converted locomotives for Mozambique, Tanzania, Mali, Sudan and Senegal. GOC has produced five metre-gauge diesel engines for Malaysia. Three remodelled metre-gauge locomotives were exported to Benin. By December 2008, the workshop had sent 111 refurbished locomotives overseas. It has till now indigenously manufactured 6 X-Class Steam Engines, 4 from 2011-2014 and 2 from 2021-2022, for the use on the Rack-Adhesion route between Mettupalayam and Coonoor in the Nilgiri Mountain Railway.

== See also ==
- Rail Wheel Factory
- List of locomotive builders
- Rolling stock manufacturers of India
