= Chathiram Bus Station, Tiruchirappalli =

Bus terminal in Tamil Nadu, India

Chathiram Bus Stand சத்திரம் பேருந்து நிலையம்

General information
- Location: Chintamani, Tiruchirappalli; Tamil Nadu. PIN – 620 002. India
- Coordinates: 10°49′53″N 78°41′36″E
- Owner: Tiruchirappalli City Municipal Corporation
- Operator: Department of Transport (Tamil Nadu)
- Platforms: 8

Construction
- Parking: Yes
- Cycle facilities: Yes
- Accessible: Disabled access

History
- Opened: 1979; 47 years ago

Passengers
- 50,000 / Per day
Location

Chathiram Bus Stand, Tiruchirappalli, old name Chinnaiya Pillai Chathiram also popularly known Chathiram Perundu Nilayam or Chathiram Bus Stand, is one of the bus termini of Trichy, other being the Central Bus Stand. The terminus is located in a land of 2.05 acres (0.83 ha) near Chintamani, adjacent to St. Joseph's College.

Chinnaiya Pillai Chathiram (Choultry) Choultry is a resting place, an inn or caravansary for travelers, pilgrims or visitors to a site. Non-profit organization is involved in a variety of projects and undertakings, the aim of which was physical, social and spiritual upliftment of all. To sustain these endeavors, the most fundamental aspect is food. At the Chinnaiya Pillai Chaitram, Annadanam, the sacred offered of food during that time, to Sanyasis, volunteers, Bramhacharis, students and all daily visitors.

== Overview ==
This 'D'-graded terminus, taking its name from the nearby Chinnaiya Pillai Chathiram, became functional since 1979 and officially recognised in 2005. The terminus is managed by Department of Transport (Tamil Nadu), mostly operating TNSTC's transit buses and minibuses to northern, eastern and western parts of Tiruchirapalli district.

== Redevelopment ==
As of November 4, 2019 the bus terminus is closed for operation and being redeveloped completely at an estimated cost of ₹17.34 crore (US$1.8 million) as part of the Smart City Mission. The buses operated from the current terminal has been shifted to nearby roads where designated points has been created for different routes with makeshift shelters as an intermediate measure for continued operations. The work was originally slated to be completed in eighteen months, but due to lockdown for COVID-19 its expected to be delayed further. As per the plan the new bus terminal to host the following features. The renovated bus station was opened in 2022.

- 30 bus bays
- Passenger waiting hall
- Cloak room
- Feeding room for lactating mothers
- Ticket counters
- Food court
- Retiring room for police and bus crew
- Underground parking lot to accommodate 350 two-wheelers
- 33 commercial shops (17 on the ground floor and 16 on other floor)

== Services ==
The terminus also handles mofussil intercity bus services, express buses, highway buses and sleeper buses at scheduled hours as it serves as boarding point for north and west – bound buses belonging SETC, Karnataka State Road Transport Corporation and private operators to destinations like Chennai, Hyderabad and Bangalore.

Platform	Destinations
1	Thuvakudi, Kailasapuram, OFT, HAPP, Navalpattu, Police Colony(Via Thiruverumbur). and Thiruverumbur
2	Keeranur, Tiruchirappalli Airport, Tiruchirappalli Junction, Uraiyur, Ponmalai, OFT-HAPP, Police Colony(Via Tiruchirappalli Airport).
3	Sangiliyandapuram, Senthaneerpuram, K. K. Nagar and Kumaravayalur
4	Uraiyur, Thillai Nagar, Tiruchirappalli Junction railway station and Central Bus Station, Tiruchirappalli
5	Inam kulathur
6	Samayapuram and Manachanallur
7	Pettavaithalai and Mukkombu
8	Lalgudi and Kallanai
South Western side of terminus	Srirangam, Thiruvanaikaval
North Western side of terminus	Karur, Erode, Thuraiyur and Coimbatore
Northern side of terminus	Cuddalore, Perambalur, Neyveli, Jayankondam, Ariyalur and Musiri

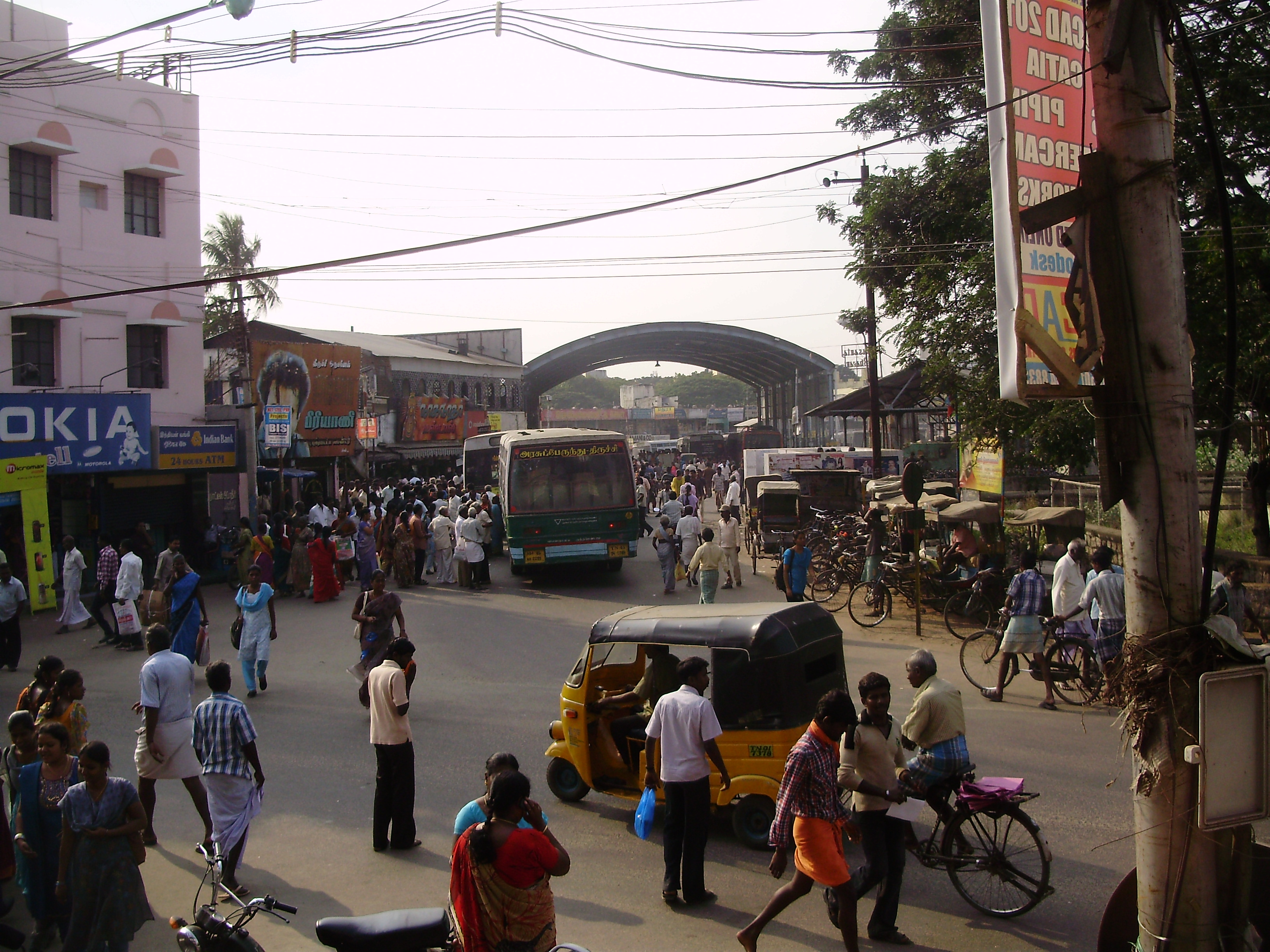
Buses proceeding into the old Lalgudi Platform.

On the left side of the terminus services for Srirangam were operated, and on the western side for Karur, Erode, Thuraiyur and Coimbatore and for Cuddalore, Perambalur, Neyveli, Jayankondam, Ariyalur and Musiri on the northern side (near Ramba Theatre complex).

== Connections ==
The terminus is connected to Tiruchirappalli Fort railway station, which is about 1.3 kilometres (0.81 mi) towards south–west and Tiruchirappalli Town railway station, about 1.4 kilometres (0.87 mi) south–east.

== In popular culture ==
The terminus prominently featured in Tamil Film, Sathiram Perundhu Nilayam (2013).

== See also ==
- Transport in Tiruchirappalli
- Transport in Tamil Nadu
- Central Bus Station, Tiruchirappalli
- Panjappur Integrated Bus Terminus, Tiruchirappalli
