= Tiruchirappalli Metro =

Proposed metro system for the city of Tiruchirappalli, India

Overview
- Locale: Tiruchirappalli, Tamil Nadu
- Transit type: Rapid Transit
- Number of lines: 3
- Number of stations: 45
- Headquarters: Tiruchirappalli

Operation
- Began operation: Proposed

Technical
- System length: 45 km (28 mi)

Tiruchirappalli Metro or Trichy Metro is a proposed rapid transit system for the city of Tiruchirappalli, Tamil Nadu. Initially the system was proposed as the Tiruchirappalli Monorail but after feasibility study it was recommended to be a metro rail project. The initial proposal recommended two lines of 45 km in length with 45 stations.

== History ==
Then Governor of Tamil Nadu, Banwarilal Brohit announced in the Legislative assembly during 2011 that the Government of Tamil Nadu has decided to do a feasibility study for introducing monorail system in Trichy along with Coimbatore and Madurai. But with the political changes in the state the project was without any progress. During 2022 the proposal was converted to study a mass transit system for the city and in 2023 it was proposed to build a full-fledged metro for the city with two corridors.

== Project timeline ==
=== 2021 ===
- In October, Trichy Corporation initiates work on preparation of Comprehensive Mobility Plan for the city to study the traffic pattern and transportation infrastructure.

=== 2022 ===
- In May, CMRL initiates Study for Detailed Feasibility Report
- In June, CMRL and Trichy Corporation held discussions on utilising the CMP data for the Metro DFR

=== 2023 ===
- In April, CMP work is completed and it suggested three potential corridors for the Metro with related traffic datapoints.
- In September, CRML submits the DFR to Tamil Nadu Government for further approval, which proposed a Mass Rapid Transit System for Trichy with 2 corridors from the CMP for a length of 45 km.

== Corridors ==
=== Comprehensive Mobility Plan ===
Corridor No	Line	From	To	Via	Length (km)
1	Line 1 (Orange)	Samayapuram	Vayalur	Srirangam, Chatram Bus Stand, Thillai Nagar	18.7
2	Line 2 (Green)	Thuvakudi	Panjapur	Thiruverumbur, Central Bus Stand	26
3	Line 3 (Purple)	Trichy Railway Junction	Panjapur	Trichy Airport, Trichy Ring Road	23.3
Total					68

=== Detailed Feasibility Report ===
Proposed Metro Rail Routes in Trichy based on Feasibility study

Trichy Metro
Corridor No	From	To	Roads	Via	Length (km)	Stations
1	Samayapuram	Vayalur			19	19
2	Thuvakudi	Panjapur			26	26
Total					45	45
