= Central Bus Station, Tiruchirappalli =

Bus terminus in Tiruchirappalli

Central Bus Station
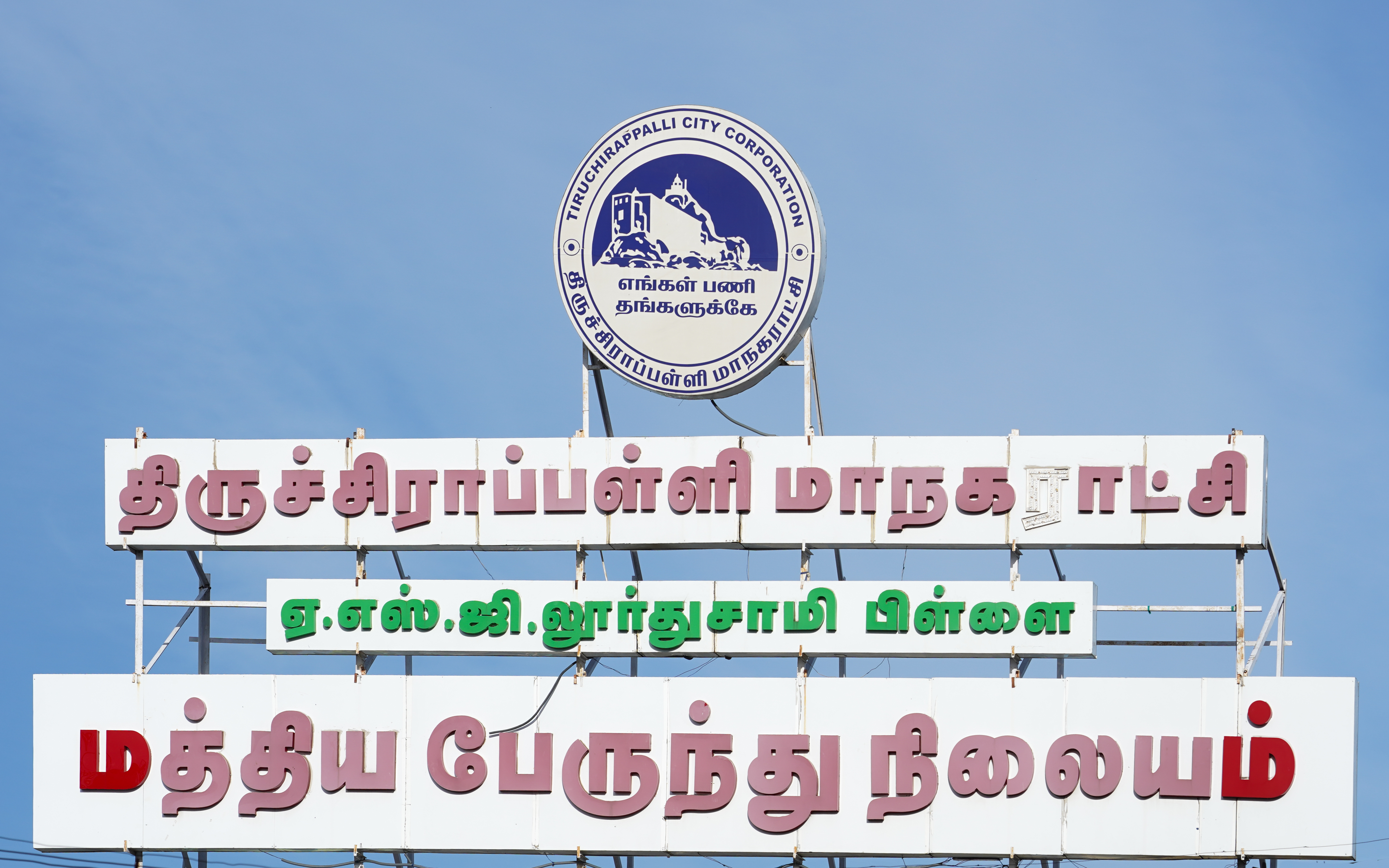
- A.S.G. Lourdasamy Pillai Central Bus Station

General information
- Location: V.O.C. Road, Cantonment, Tiruchirappalli, Tamil Nadu. PIN – 620 001. India
- Coordinates: 10.7987°N 78.6805°E
- Owner: Tiruchirappalli Municipal Corporation
- Operator: Department of Transport (Tamil Nadu)
- Platforms: 5 (77 Bays)

Construction
- Parking: Yes
- Cycle facilities: Yes
- Accessible: Disabled access

Other information
- Station code: TRI (SETC); TRH (KSRTC)

History
- Opened: 1970; 56 years ago

Passengers
- 1,00,000 per day
Location

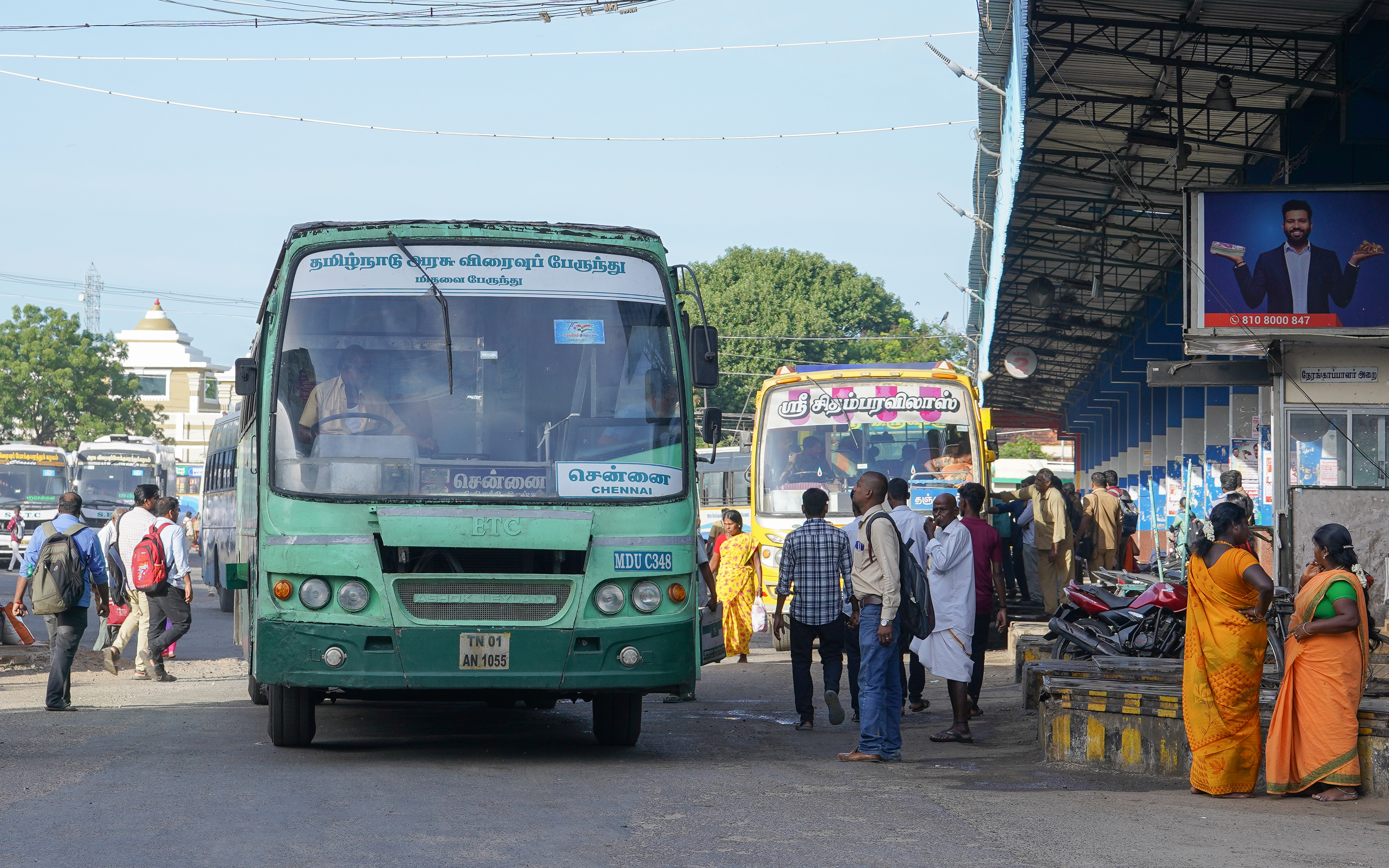
Buses departing Platforms A & 1

Central Bus Station, popularly known as Central Bus Stand, is one of the bus terminus of Trichy, located near Cantonment, the other being the Chatram Bus Stand and Panjappur Integrated Bus Terminus.

The terminus spread over an area of 4.5 acres (1.8 ha) is managed by the Department of Transport (Tamil Nadu).

== Services ==
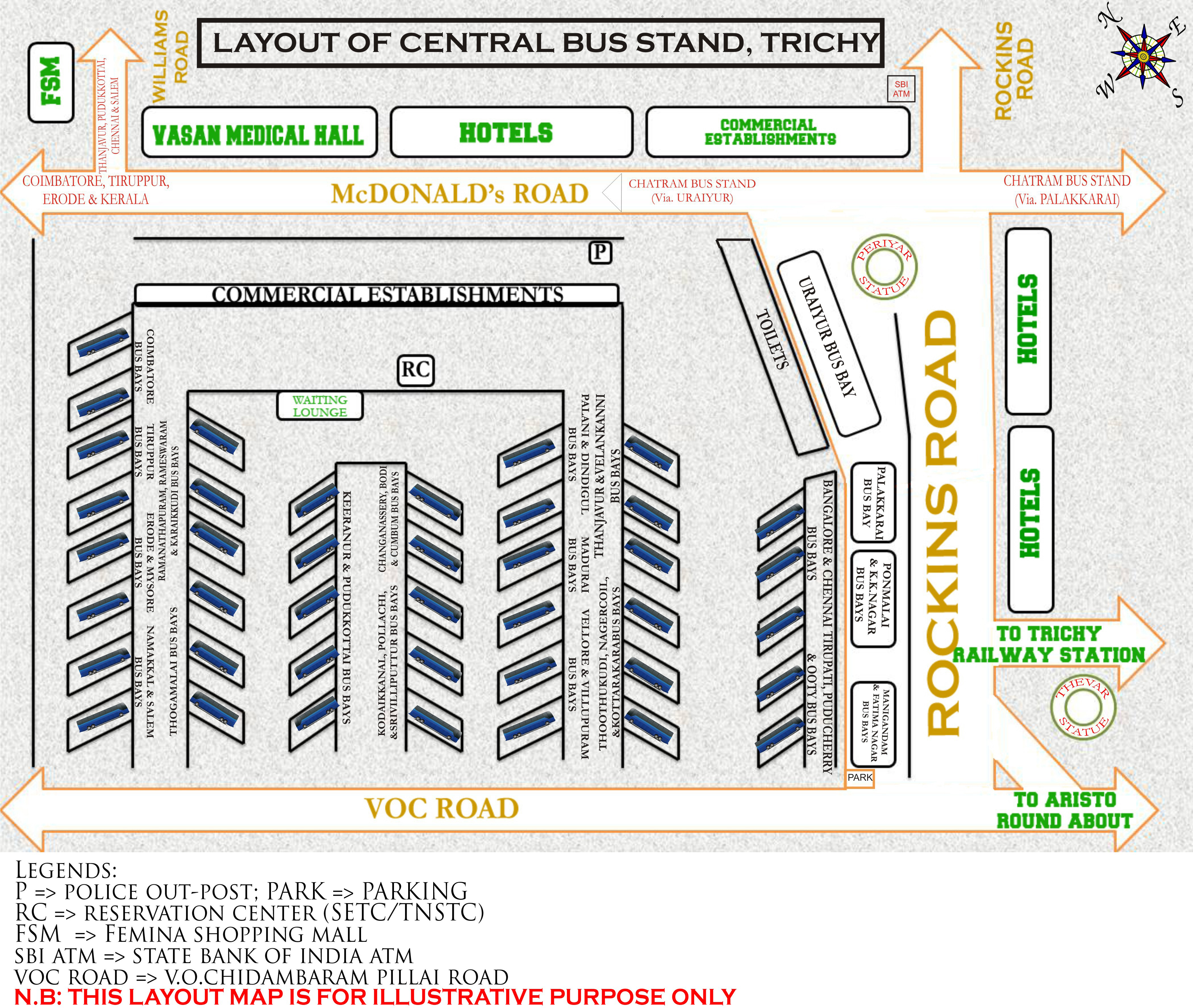
Layout of CBS, Trichy

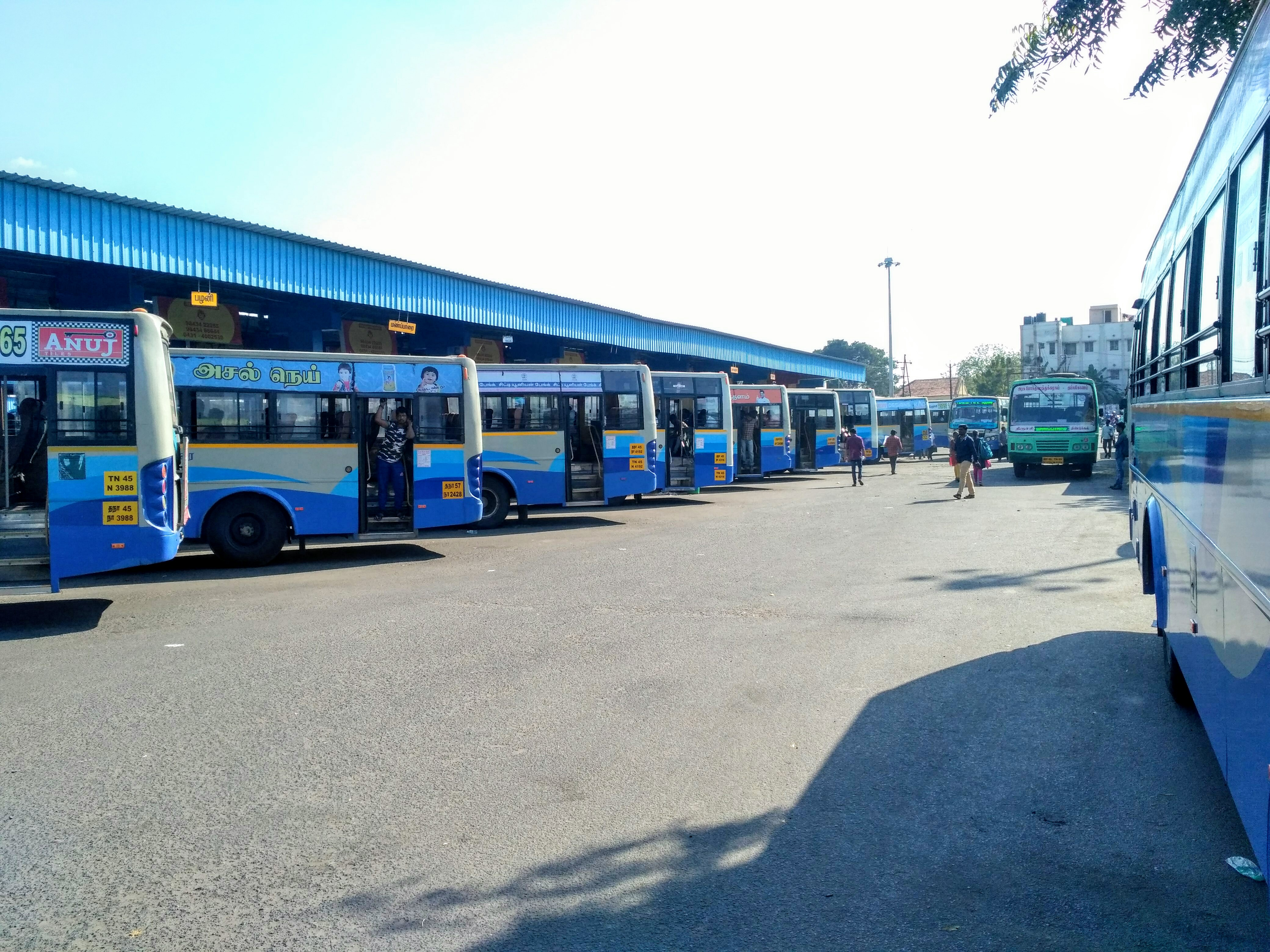
Buses parked at Platform 2

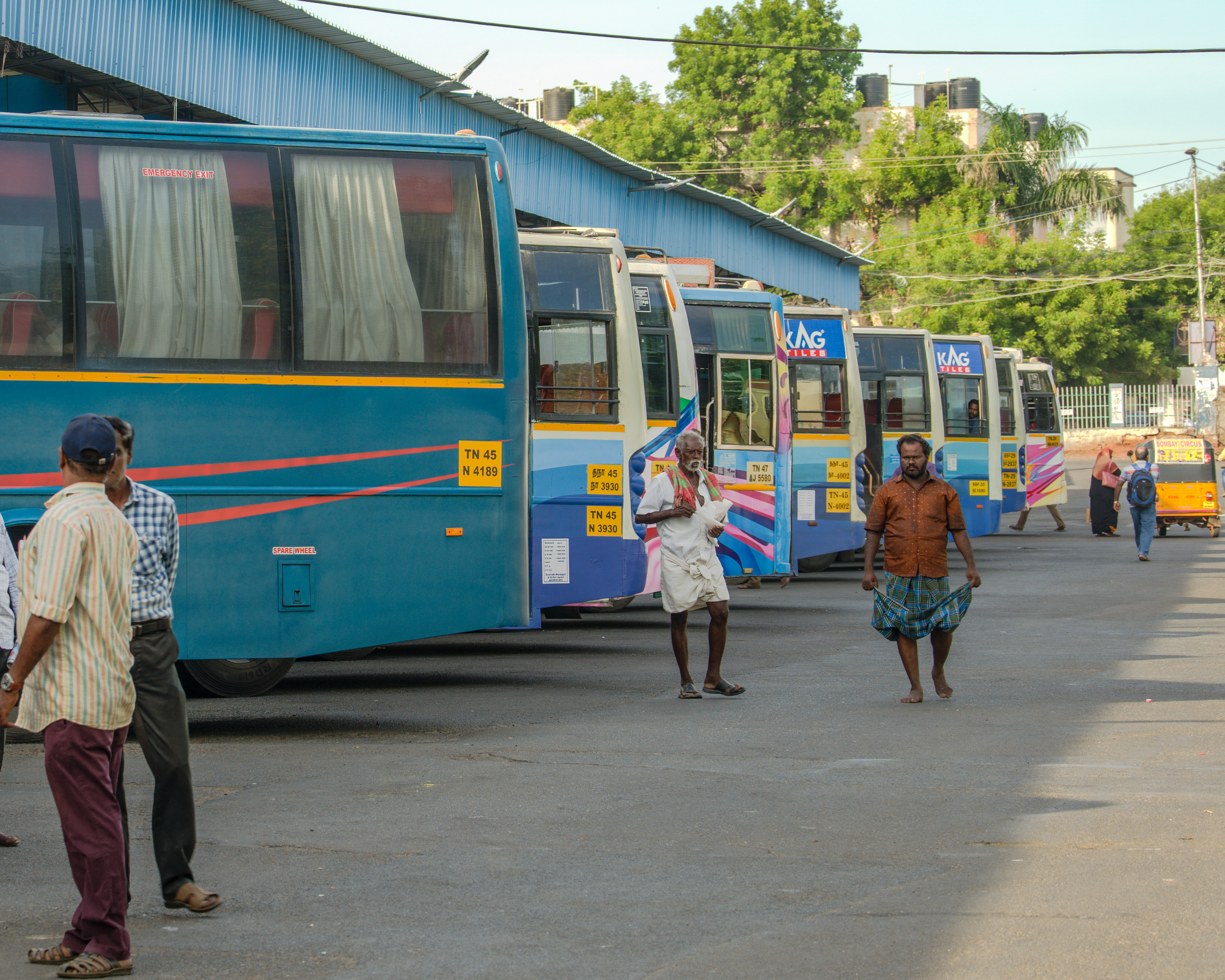
Buses parked at Platform 4

Currently, mofussil buses from western regions like Karur, Coimbatore, Tiruppur and buses arriving from Dindigul which are bound for KKBT, stop at the Devar statue roundabout outside Central bus stand.

Intracity local buses are operated from Central bus stands to various destinations like Panjappur Integrated Bus Terminus, Sri Rangam, Chathiram bus stand (via-Woraiyur), Chathiram bus stand (via-Thillai Nagar), Chathiram bus stand (via- Palakkarai, Rockfort), K. K. Nagar, Edamalaipatti Pudur, Ponmalai, Inamkulathur.

== Expansion ==
During 2008, the city corporation acquired about 1.6 ha (4.0 acres) of land belonging to railways for expansion. As a result, the town bus terminus was moved just outside the station to Rockins road with new bus shelters. To accommodate the evergrowing movement of mofussil buses, two additional platforms were extended up to 45 m (148 ft) thereby increasing the number of bays from 55 to 77. Also in addition, a multi-storeyed two-wheeler parking lot inside the bus station was constructed. Post expansion, following demands to honour A.S.G. Lourdusamy Pillai, former chairman of Tiruchi Municipality and father of Adaikalaraj, the name of the bus station was officially changed to A. S. G. Lourdusamy Pillai Central Bus Station and accredited with ISO 9001:2008 certification.

== Developments ==
Due to the strategic location of the terminus within the city and the city within the state, it is quite often to witness heavy traffic particularly during festivals. Ever since during the 1990s a proposal for a new integrated bus stand was mooted under the scheme of Integrated Urban Development Programme, small and medium towns (Municipalities and Town Panchayats). Initially about 244.28 acres (98.86 ha) at Panjappur, near NH 45B was identified, but was dropped citing as flood prone area. Again sites at Devadhanam, Corporation garbage dump at Ariyamangalam and Defence land in Mannarpuram were suggested. For the 86 acres (35 ha) site at Devadhanam, the Tamil Nadu Pollution Control Board refused to issue a mandatory No Objection certificate due to the proximity of the Cauvery river and a possible pollution in future and so as the farmers and residents of the area opposed the move for same reason and went to court. Yet the 100 acres (40 ha) defence land at Mannarpuram was favoured due to its proximity to Tiruchirappalli Junction and within the centre of city, but slow response from Ministry of Defence keeps the issue lingering. The fate were same for the site at Ramji Nagar, near NH 45 and Kottapattu, near NH 210. The committee which was constituted by the court in 2006 to find an amicable and consensual decision, composed of officials from Revenue, Town and Country Planning, Corporation, Tamil Nadu Pollution Control Board and the Public Works Department, started the process afresh during mid-2011.

In 2022, foundation stone was laid for construction of new Integrated bus terminus at Panjappur in the outskirts of Trichy. The new Integrated bus Terminus was opened on 9 May 2025 and became operational from July 16 2025. So the mofussil buses which were operated from Central bus stand till then, were operated from the new KKBT.

== Connections to other modes of transport ==
The terminus is about 700 metres (2,300 ft) away from Tiruchirappalli Junction and about 5.6 kilometres (3.5 mi) from Tiruchirappalli International Airport.

== See also ==
- Central Bus Station, Kumbakonam
- Transport in Tiruchirappalli
- Transport in Tamil Nadu
- Panjappur Integrated Bus Terminus, Tiruchirappalli
