= Tiruchirappalli Monorail =

Cancelled metrorail

Tiruchirappalli Metrorail
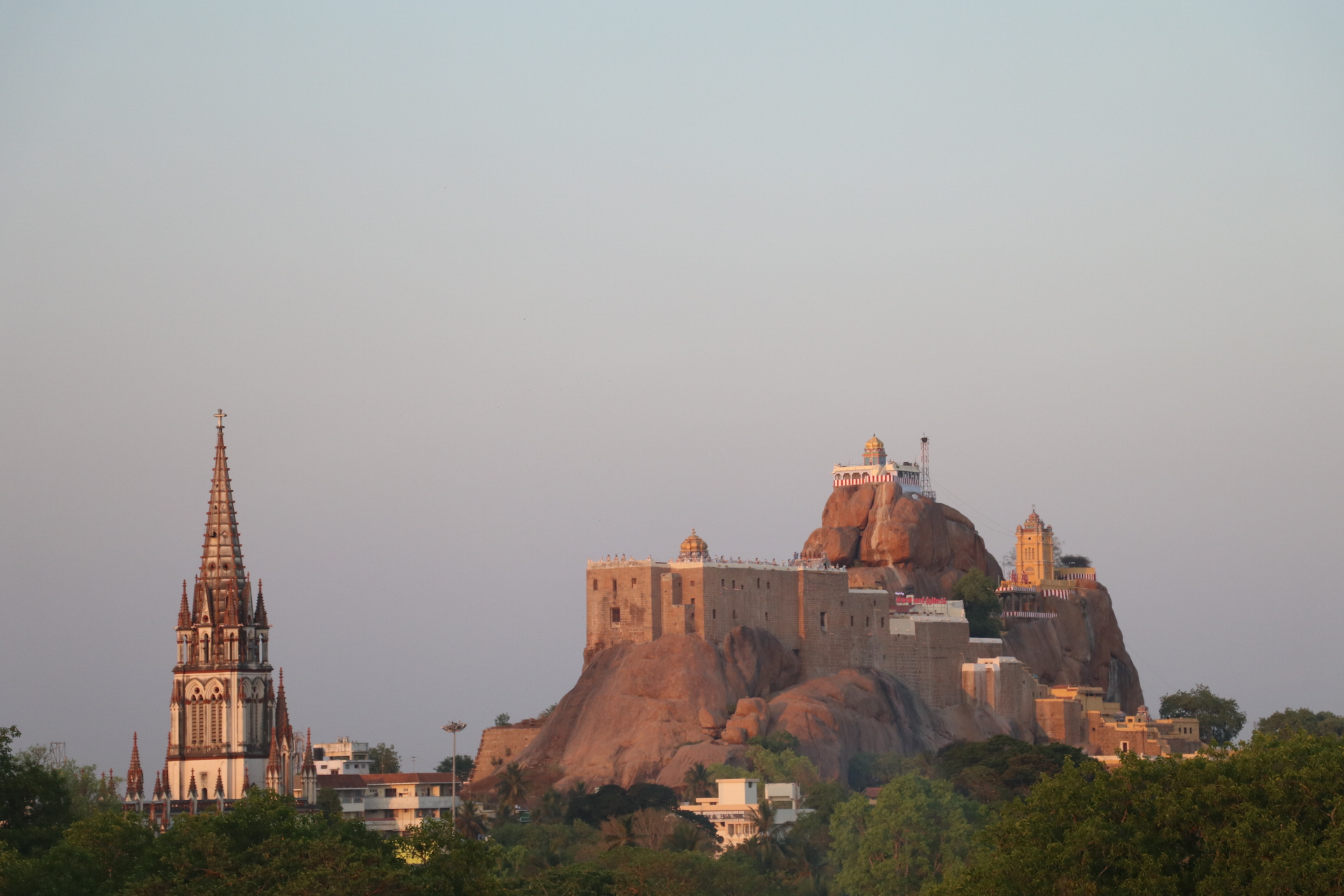

Overview
- Locale: Tiruchirappalli, Tamil Nadu
- Transit type: Metrorail (project on going)
- Headquarters: Tiruchirappalli

Tiruchirappalli Metrorail was a proposed monorail system for the city of Tiruchirappalli, Tamil Nadu, part of a major expansion of public transport in the city.

As of March 2021 the proposal was still only on paper. After a feasibility study, it was replaced by a rail project, the Tiruchirappalli Metro.

== Overview ==
As the monorail market is estimated to be ₹72,000 crore (US$7.7 billion) in India, the then Governor of Tamil Nadu, Banwarilal Brohit announced in Legislative assembly that the Government of Tamil Nadu has decided to do a feasibility study for introducing monorail system in Tiruchi along with Salem Metro, Madurai Metro, and Tirunelveli.

== Cost ==
The government has earmarked a sum of about ₹60,000 crore (US$6.4 billion) for metro and monorail projects in Tamil Nadu.

== Network ==
A faculty member from SASTRA, using Geographical Information System (GIS) tools, had worked out a proposal for a suburban railway route linking the Srirangam Island with Tiruchirapalli and its suburbs.

The proposal suggested circular operation in the following routes:

- Srirangam → Amma Mandapam → Tiruchirappalli Fort → Palakkarai → Railway Junction → Golden Rock → Tiruchirappalli Town → Srirangam
- Railway Junction → Palakkarai → Fort → Amma Mandapam → Srirangam → Town → Golden Rock → Railway Junction.

The proposal also suggested a new rail link between Chord line and Tiruchirapalli-Karur railway lines, Via. Amma Mandapam and also a possible extension to Kailasapuram (BHEL) and Bikshandarkovil neighbourhoods. There is no decision on extending the line to cover the Central and Chathiram bus stations and the Tiruchirappalli International Airport.
