= Chennai Metro Rail Limited =

Metro rail operator in Tamil Nadu, India

Chennai Metro Rail Limited (CMRL)

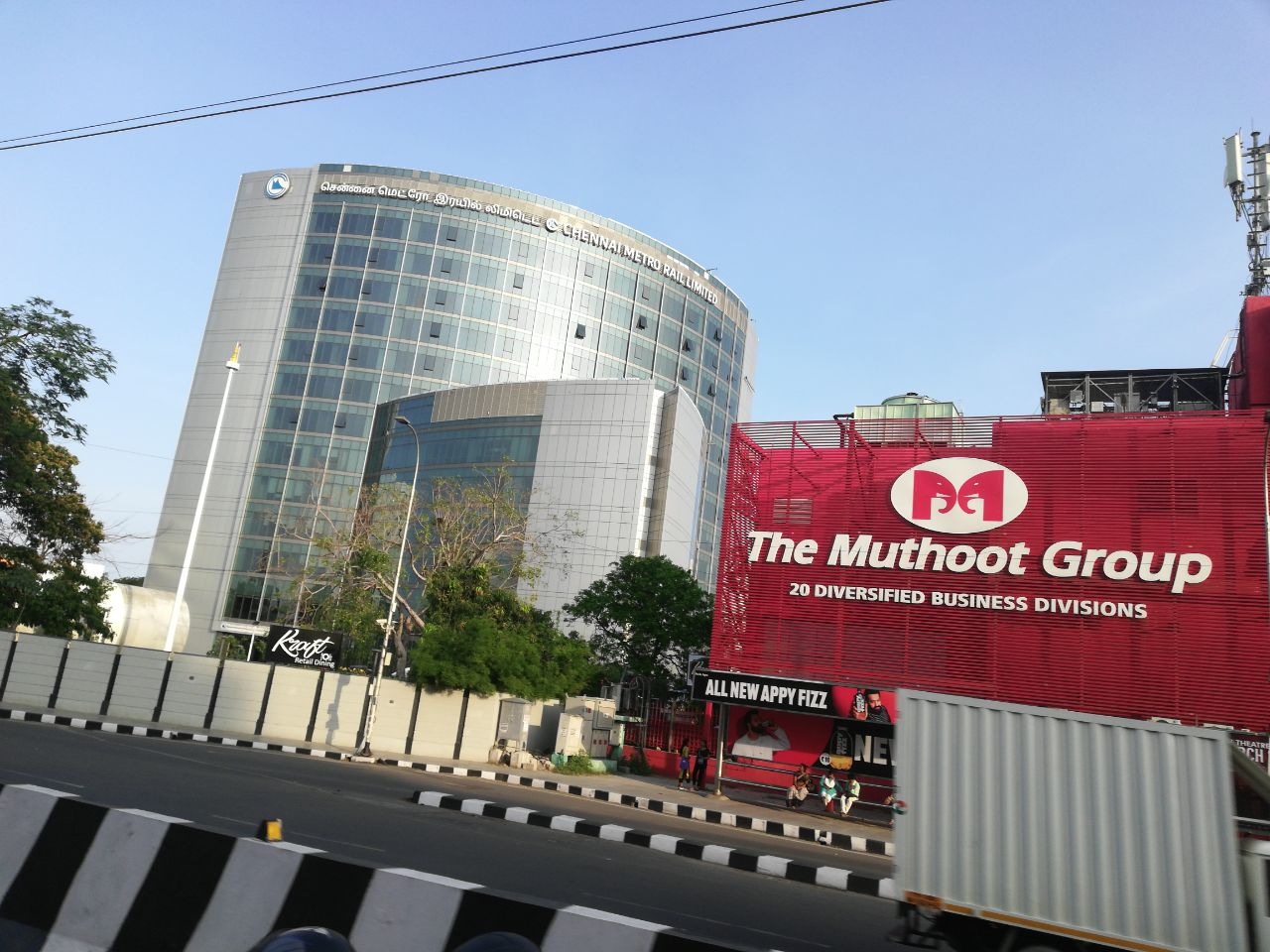
- Headquarters of CMRL
- Type: Public
- Industry: Public transport
- Founded: 3 December 2007; 18 years ago
- Headquarters: MetroS, Anna Salai, Nandanam, Chennai
- Area served: Chennai
- Key people: Ashish Chatterjee IAS, MD
- Services: Chennai Metro
- Revenue: ▲₹486.55 crore (US$51 million) (2022–23)
- Operating income: ▲₹272.26 crore (US$28 million) (2022–23)
- Net income: ▲₹−566.74 crore (US$−59 million) (2022–23)
- Total assets: ▲₹33,683.79 crore (US$3.5 billion) (2022–23)
- Total equity: ▲₹5,731.59 crore (US$600 million) (2022–23)
- Owners: Government of India (50%); Government of Tamil Nadu (50%)
- Number of employees: 352 (regular); 185 (contract) (2023)
- Website: chennaimetrorail.org

Chennai Metro Rail Limited (CMRL) is a centre-state joint venture that built and operates the Chennai Metro. It was established in 2007 and is headquartered in Chennai. CMRL is also involved in the planning and implementation of other metro rail and monorail projects in Tamil Nadu.

== History ==
Government of Tamil Nadu approved the Chennai Metro project in November 2007. Chennai Metro Rail Limited (CMRL), a SPV was established in December 2007 as a joint venture between the Government of India and Government of Tamil Nadu, and is headquartered in Chennai. In June 2015, commercial operations of the Chennai metro started and the first phase was completed by February 2019. Since 2019, CMRL is involved in the construction of the second phase of the Chennai metro.

== Administration and operations ==
CMRL is headquartered at MetroS building in Anna Salai, Nandanam. The company is headed by a board consisting of 12 directors, five nominated by Government of India including the chairman, five nominated by Government of Tamil Nadu including the Managing director and two full time operational directors. The main operational control center (OCC) is located in Koyambedu where the movement of trains and real-time CCTV footage obtained is monitored. As of 2024, CMRL operates two colour-coded lines covering a length of 54.1 km (33.6 mi). Chennai Metro maintains depots at Koyambedu and Wimco Nagar, which house maintenance workshops, stabling lines, test tracks and washing plant for the trains.

Financials
Financial Year (FY)	2021-22	2022-23
Revenue (₹Cr)	210.85	486.55
Operating income (₹Cr)	129.22	272.26
Net profit (₹Cr)	−85.79	−34.03
Profit before tax (₹Cr)	−722.98	−566.74

== Other projects ==
CMRL will take over Chennai Mass Rapid Transit System (MRTS) system from Southern Railway once the under construction expansion of MRTS is complete. It is also involved in the planning of light rail and extension of metro in Chennai. CMRL also undertakes other projects including the development of metro rail transport in the cities of Coimbatore, Madurai and Tiruchirapalli.

CMRL developed the Kathipara Urban Square as a multi-modal transport hub with parking and recreational areas. In 2023, it proposed the development of Central Square around its headquarters with commercial complexes and multi-storied buildings. In April 2025, CMRL announced that it has identified public spaces in Adyar and Velachery which would be transformed into public utility spaces similar to the Kathipara Urban Square. In August 2025, it launched a beautification project covering Chennai's Broken Bridge and nearby areas. The proposed plan also included developing the areas beneath the Indira Nagar MRTS station and the rail over bridge near Velachery railway station into public utility spaces.

== Systems ==
=== Operational Systems ===
As of 11 October 2026

List of current operational systems in Tamil Nadu
System	Locale	Lines operational	Stations	Length		Opened	Annual ridership (in millions)
System	Locale	Lines operational	Stations	Operational	Under construction	Opened	Annual ridership (in millions)
Chennai Metro	Chennai Metropolitan Area	3	54 (Note: There are a total of three interchange stations counted with the number of lines they serve. If interchange stations are counted only once, the number comes down to 51 stations.)	68.7 km (42.7 mi)	104.30 km (64.81 mi)	29 June 2015	111.90 (2025)
Total		3	54	68.7 km (42.7 mi)	104.3 km (64.8 mi)	—N/a	111.9 million

Table note

^* Indicates ridership figures based on the fiscal year rather than the calendar year.

=== Systems in development ===
As of 6 October 2026

Under construction
Centre approved DPR
Central DPR appraisal
Centre rejected DPR
State approved DPR
DPR submitted
DPR under preparation
On hold

System	Locale	Length		Construction began	Planned opening
System	Locale	Under construction	Planned	Construction began	Planned opening
Coimbatore Metro	Coimbatore		40 km (25 mi)	TBD	TBD
Madurai Metro	Madurai		32 km (20 mi)	TBD	TBD
Tiruchirappalli Metro	Tiruchirapalli		10 km (6.2 mi)	TBD	TBD
Total		71.43 km (44.38 mi)	458.024 km (284.603 mi)		
