= Chinthamani, Madurai district =

Town in Madurai district, Tamil Nadu, India

Chinthamani
- Village
- Location in India Location in Tamil Nadu
- Coordinates: 9°53′34″N 78°8′21″E
- Country: India
- State: Tamil Nadu
- District: Madurai
- Village: Chinthamani
- Time zone: UTC+5.30 (IST)
- PIN: 625009
- Telephone code: 0452

Chinthamani is a part in Madurai, in the Indian state of Tamil Nadu. The town comes under the Thirupparangundram constituency.

== Location ==
It is located 4 km South of Madurai headquarters, 9 km from Tirupparangunram. 492 km from State capital Chennai. Madurai Airport is located in 1.5 km from Chinthamani. Anuppanadi (1 km), Sourastra Teachers Colony (1 km), Keerathurai (1 km), Villapuram (2 km), Rajamaan Nagar (2 km) are the nearby villages. Thirupuvanam, Thirumangalam, Sholavandan are the nearby Cities to Chinthamani. Sub Villages in Chinthamani are Ayyanarpuram, Burmacolony, Kajendrapuram, Kannan Colony.

== Politics ==
In 2011, Chinthamani joined with Madurai Corporation and it is under the third Mandalam of Madurai Corporation. Chinthamani is the 56th ward in Madurai Corporation. Its Lokshabha Constituency is Virudhunagar and its Vidhan Sabha constituency is Tirupparangunram. Chinthamani is famous for Appalam production. More appalam production small scale industries are functioning in the chinthamani village. Also there are many rice mills near chinthamani.

A new police station was sanctioned for Chinthamani in September 2025. Within a year, the police station was in the news for wrong reasons as the Madras High Court ordered a probe for a custodial death at Chinthamani police station.

The village was in news in March 2026 when all the nine accused were convicted in the petrol bomb attack case that claimed the lives of seven youths on Thevar Jayanthi day, 30 October 2012.
