= Panjappur Integrated Bus Terminus, Tiruchirappalli =

Express bus terminus in Tiruchirapalli, India

Muthamizh Arignar Kalaignar M.Karunanidhi Integrated Bus Terminus (KKBT) முத்தமிழறிஞர் கலைஞர் மு. கருணாநிதி ஒருங்கிணைந்த பேருந்து முனையம்
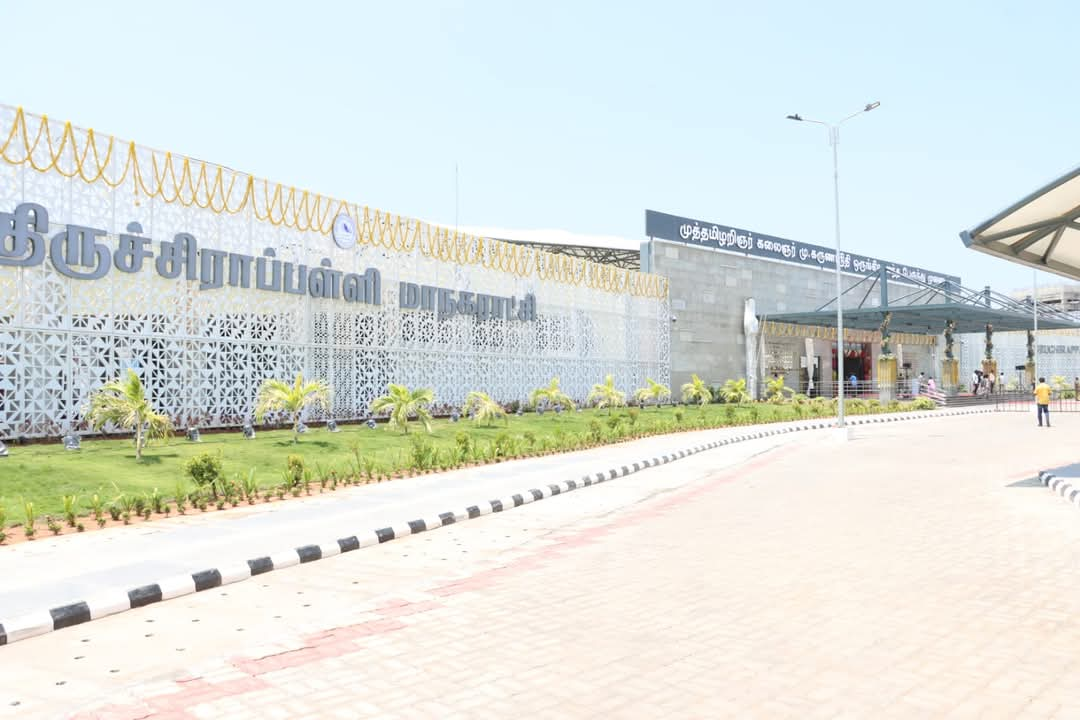
- Terminus Entrance

General information
- Other names: KKBT
- Location: Madurai National Highway, Panjapur; Tamil Nadu; India
- Coordinates: 10.7559°N 78.6558°E
- System: Bus terminus
- Owner: TCC
- Platforms: 202
- Bus routes: Tamil Nadu; Kerala; Karnataka; Andhra Pradesh; Puducherry
- Bus operators: TNSTC; SETC; Kerala SRTC; Karnataka SRTC; PRTC; Contract Carriage

Construction
- Structure type: Underground, At-grade & First Floor
- Parking: Yes
- Cycle facilities: Yes
- Accessible: yes

History
- Opened: 9 May 2025
Location

Panjappur Integrated Bus Terminus (KKBT), officially Muthamizh Arignar Kalaignar M. Karunanidhi Integrated Bus Terminus, is a bus terminus in Panjapur, Tiruchirappalli is the first Air Conditioned bus terminus in the state of Tamil Nadu. Situated along the Madurai Highway, it was inaugurated on 9 May 2025 and became operational from 16 July 2025. Spread over an area of 115.68 acres (468,100 m^{2}), it was built to create an integrated bus terminus for the city since the current terminals are completely congested and during festival times the buses are operated from temporary locations around the city. The terminus operates all Mofussil and City buses. Designated bays for contract carriage (omni) buses are still under construction.

== History ==
The Foundation stone for the construction was laid on 10 October 2022.

== Financials ==
The Bus Terminal has been constructed at the cost of ₹408.36 crore (US$42 million). Apart from that a separate Omni bus terminal is under construction on the same complex at the cost of ₹17.60 crore (US$1.8 million)

== Infrastructure ==
The Bus terminus includes an Multi Utility Facility Center (MUFC), Crew Rest Complex, Multiple Toilet Complexes and Underground Parking to support the needs of commuters. Other facilities available are ATM, Ticket Booking Counters, Luggage Cloak Room, Passenger Rest Hall, Parcel Handling Facility, Fire Extinguishers, Police Rooms, Baby Feeding Rooms, Time Keeper Rooms, Purified Drinking Water, Generator for uninterrupted power, Passenger Addressing System, Book Stores, Free Wi-Fi, Free Cellphone Charging facilities are being provided.

Facility Statistics
Type	Count
Moffussil Bus Operational Bays	120
Long Term Halt Bays	141
Shot Term Halt Bays	84
Town Bus Bays	56
Omni Bus Operational Bays	37
Omni Bus Halt Bays	45
Auto Bays	50 + 50
Shops	78
Restaurants	4
Underground + Ground Level Parking	1544 Two-Wheelers + 391 Two-Wheelers and 216 Four-Wheelers
Urinals + Toilets	173 + 152
Crew Rest Hall	208 Beds
Air Conditioner Capacity	704 Tonnes
Lift + Escalators	6 + 6
LED Display Board	50
CCTV Cameras	166

== Platforms ==
=== Ground floor: Mofussil buses ===
Platform	Destinations
1	Banglore (SETC, KSRTC), Tirupati (SETC)
2	Chennai Madhavaram, Chennai Kilambakkam (TNSTC, SETC)
3	Puducherry, Tiruvannamalai, Vellore, Virudachalam, Thittakudi, Cuddalore, Neyveli, Viluppuram, Kanchipuram, Arani
4	Thogaimalai, Palayam, Coimbatore, Ooty, Mettupalayam, Karur, Kulithalai, Erode (via-Karur), Tiruppur, Dharapuram
5	Madurai, Tirunelveli, Nagercoil, Marthandam, Thiruvananthapuram, Kanyakumari, Tiruchendur, Thoothukudi, Sivakasi, Sengottai, Kovilpatti, Thuvarankurichi, Ponnamaravathi, Manapparai, Dindigul, Palani, Pollachi, Theni, Kambam, Kumily, Thevaram, Kodaikanal, Bodi
6	Namakkal, Salem, Bangalore, Hosur, Dharmapuri, Erode (via-Namakkal), Musiri
7	Thanjavur, Thiruvarur, Nagapattinam, Velankanni, Vedaranyam, Thiruthuraipoondi, Mannargudi, Pattukottai, Nagore, Karaikkal, Kumbakonam, Mayiladuthurai, Chidambaram, Sirkali, Pudukkottai, Karaikudi, Devakottai, Paramakudi, Kamuthi, Mudukulathur, Ramanathapuram, Thondi, Sivagangai, Tirupattur, Annavasal, Sayalgudi, Aranthangi, Peravurani, Alangudi, Iluppur, Rameswaram, Gandarvakottai
8	Rameswaram, Thanjavur (1 to 1), Kumbakonam

=== First Floor: City buses ===
Route map of the TNSTC city buses of Tiruchirappalli

Platform	Routes	Bus Number (Government)
1	Samayapuram (Bye-pass), Chathiram bus stand/Sri Rangam (via- Palakkarai, Rockfort)	100,1,1E
2	Chathiram bus stand/ Sri Rangam (via- GH, Thillai Nagar)	26,120
3	Chathiram bus stand/ Sri Rangam (via- GH,Woraiyur)	52,60,8,9
4	Viralimalai, Thuvakkudi, Keeranur, Bharathidasan University/Anna University - Trichy Campus	Viralimalai towards Madurai - 45, 45A, 45B; Bharatidasan/Anna Univ. - Keeranur - Buses towards Pudhukottai, 63, 63A, 63C
5	Mannarpuram - TVS Tollgate - Airport - Mathur - OFT - HAPP	93

== See also ==
- Trichy Central Bus Stand
- Trichy Chatram Bus Stand
- Tiruchirappalli International Airport
- Transport in Tiruchirappalli
