= Central Bus Station Kumbakonam =

Bus station in Tamil Nadu, India

Kumbakonam Central Bus Station / Arignar Anna Moffusil Bus Station

General information
- Location: John Selvaraj Nagar, Kumbakonam, Thanjavur district, Tamil Nadu. PIN – 612001. India
- Coordinates: 10.9590°N 79.3878°E
- Owner: Kumbakonam Municipal corporation
- Operator: Department of Transport (Tamil Nadu)
- Platforms: 4 (60 bays)

Construction
- Parking: Yes
- Cycle facilities: Yes
- Accessible: Disabled access

Other information
- Station code: KUM (SETC); KUM (KSRTC); KUM (PRTC)
- Fare zone: TNSTC Kumbakonam Division 454/TAJ

History
- Opened: 1992; 34 years ago

Passengers
- 50,000 per day

Services
2,500 Bus trips/day
Location

Central Bus Station, popularly known as Central Bus Stand or Arignar Anna Moffusil Bus Stand is one of the main bus terminus of Kumbakonam, a town in Thanjavur district of Tamil Nadu, India. The bus terminus is classified as "A" category bus station. The other bus stand is Town bus stand.

The prominent Mahamaham tank is 3 km away from the Central Bus Station. There are two bus stands one for mofussil services and one for town services opposite to moffusil bus stand. In future Kumbakonam need a Integrated bus stand at Chennai bypass road considering the four laning of Thanjavur Kumbakonam Vikravandi NH 36. The present bus stand is well inside the town as it was proposed in 1980s and started to function from 1989.

== Services ==
Around 1,500 Bus trips are start, end or passes through the Bus terminus every day.

== Routes ==
Platform	Destination
1	Chennai, Tirupati, Bengaluru, Mysuru (SETC Buses), Vadalur, Panruti, Tindivanam, Ariyalur, Viluppuram, Neyveli, Tiruvannamalai, Vellore, Virudhachalam, Cuddalore, Jayankondam, Arani, Anaikarai, Sethiyathope, kallakurichi, Tirupati, Vikravandi, Ulundurpet and Karnataka state buses (KSRTC)
2	Pondicherry, Mayiladuthurai, Chidambaram, Mannargudi, Pattukkottai, Peravurani, Sirkazhi, Manalmedu, Vaitheeswarankoil, Muthupet, Needamangalam, Poompuhar and Pondicherry state Buses towards Pondicherry (PRTC).
3	Thanjavur, Trichy, Erode, Salem, Tiruppur, Karur, Coimbatore, Dindigul, Palani, Theni, Pollachi, Kodaikanal, Edappadi, Kumili, Ooty, Oddanchatram, Namakkal, Palladam, Pudukkottai, Madurai, Karaikudi, Ramanathapuram, Cumbum, Periyakulam, Udumalaipettai, Hosur, Rameswaram, Paramakudi, Kamuthi, Tiruchendur, Tuticorin, Tirunelveli, Tenkasi, Sivakasi, Virudhunagar, Rajapalayam, Kovilpatti, Aruppukkottai, Nagercoil, Trivandrum, Sankari, Guruvayur and Kerala state buses (KSRTC)
4	Thiruvarur, Nagapattinam, Vedaranyam, Karaikal, Thirunallar, Nannilam, Kudavasal, Velankanni, Thiruthuraipoondi and Pondicherry state Buses towards Karaikal (PRTC)

== Connections ==
The terminus is about 200 metres (660 ft) away from Kumbakonam Town Bus stand and about 1,000 metres (3,300 ft) away from Kumbakonam railway station.

== See also ==
- Kumbakonam railway station
- Transport in Thanjavur
- Transport in Tamil Nadu
