= Transport in Tiruchirappalli =

Tiruchirapalli International Airport

Tiruchirappalli has a well-developed transport infrastructure. Being located almost at the geographic centre of the state Tamil Nadu, India, Tiruchirappalli is well connected with most cities in the country.

== Roads ==
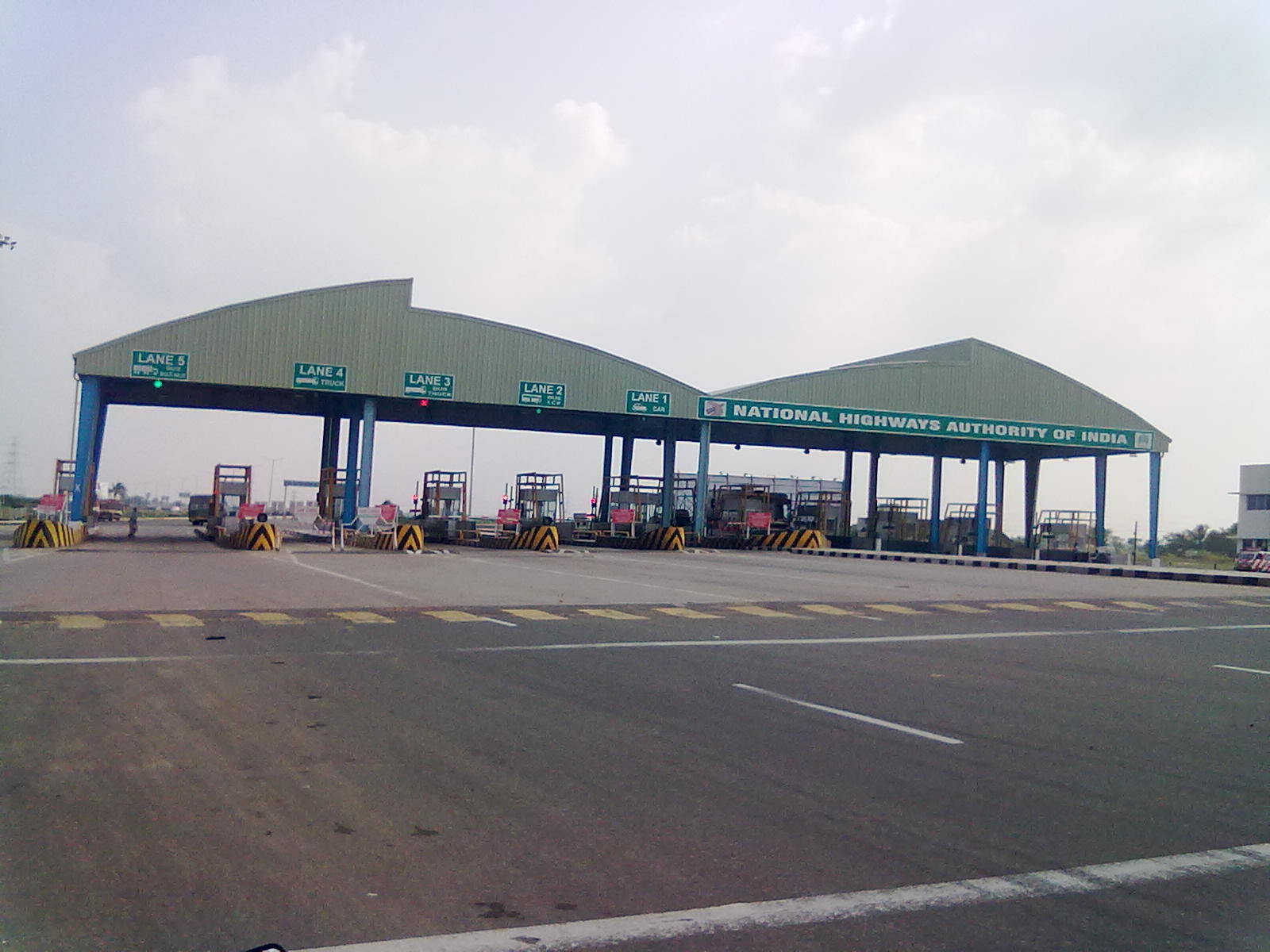
Toll Gate in Tiruchirappalli on NH 67

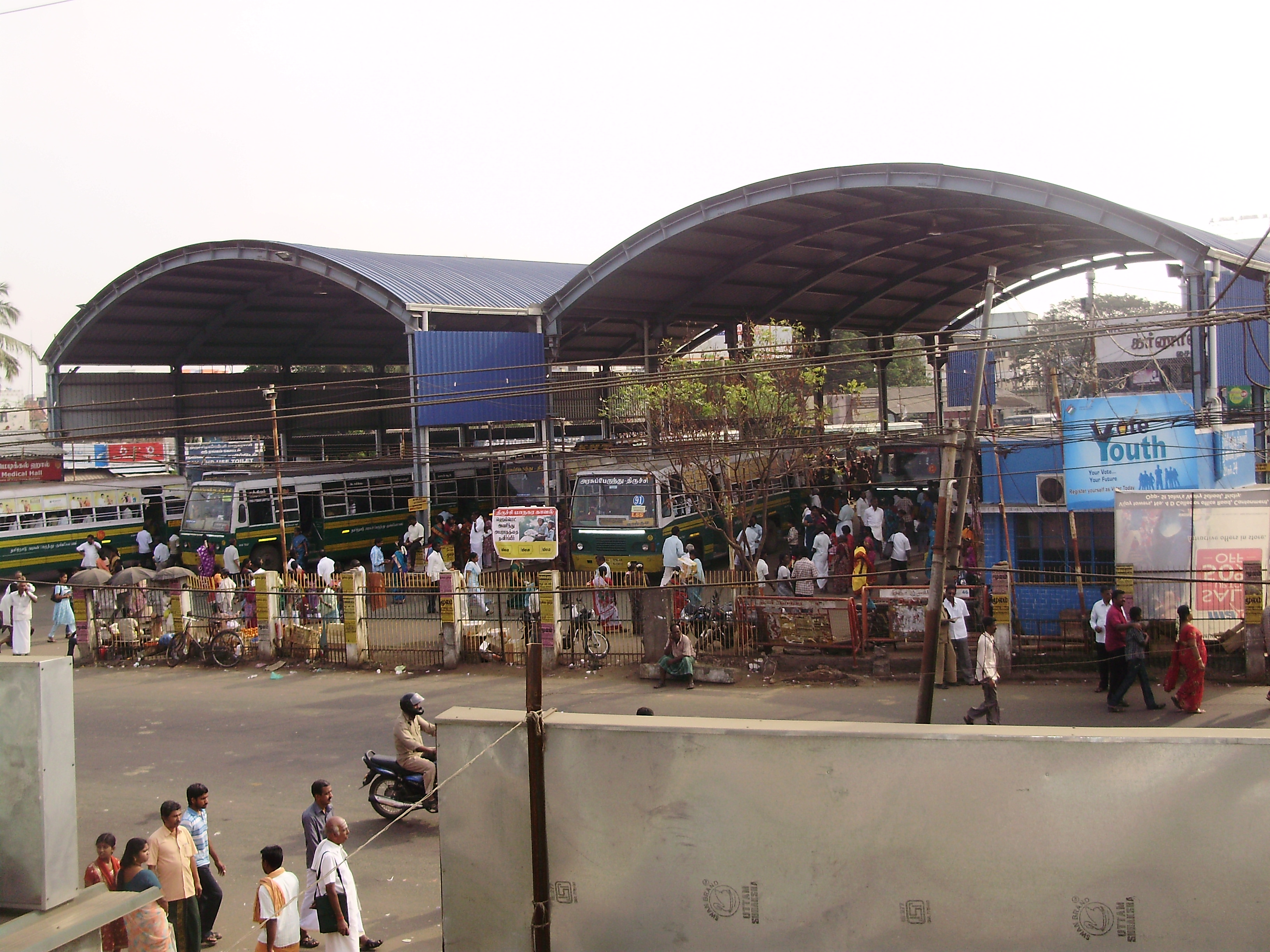
Chatiram Bus Station in Tiruchirappalli

Tiruchirappalli City has 1294.27 km of roads as of 2017 in which 268.41 km is of unsurfaced and rest all are surfaced in some form. Bharathidhasan Road has been designed as a model road of the city. Other arterial roads include Bharathiyar Road, Collector Office Road, Thennur High Road, Salai Road, Sastri Road, Madurai Road, Thillainagar Main Road, College Road, and Gandhi Road. Various initiatives have been taken up by the city corporation during 2018 and 2019 with private partnerships, smart-city modeling and various funds to install facilities like open-air gym on roadsides and fountains on roundabouts; one smart road has also been created.

=== National highways ===
Tiruchirappalli being in the central point of the state means that it has major national highways radiating out as follows:

- NH 38 (Old NH 45) towards Perambalur, Villupuram, Vellore leading to Chennai
- NH 81 (Old NH 227) towards Jayamkondam, Chidambaram
- NH 83 (Old NH 67) towards Thanjavur, Nagapattinam
- NH 336 (Old NH 210) towards Pudukottai leading to Rameshwaram
- NH 38 (Old NH 45B) towards Madurai, Tuticorin
- NH 83 (Old NH 45) towards Dindigul, Palani, Coimbatore
- NH 81 (Old NH 67) towards Karur, Coimbatore

Major Tamil Nadu state highways leading out of the city are:

- SH 22 towards Kumbakonam, Mayiladuthurai, Poompuhar
- SH 25 towards Musiri, Namakkal, Salem leading to Bangalore
- SH 62 towards Thuraiyur

=== Bypass and Ring Road ===
Tiruchirappalli has two bypasses built. The Chennai Bypass was built to shift old NH-45 out of the city starting from No.1 Tollgate to Mannarpuram which extended later to Edamalaipatti Pudhur during the conversion of the highways to four-lane highways. Karur Byepass road was built as an alternate alignment to reach NH 67 from the city near Salai Road without touching the Chatiram Bus Station.

A semi-ring road was proposed in 2007 along with a four-lane widening of old NH 67 and old NH 45. The semi-ring starts from Jeeyapuram in NH 81 and ends at Thuvakkudi in NH 83 connection NH 83 at Cholan Nagar, NH 38 at Panjappur, NH 336 at Mathur. The project is split into two stages: Jeeyapuram to Panchapur and Panchapur to Thuvakudi. The work came to a halt in 2009 due to a court case to modify the alignment of stage 1 which was crossing over bodies of water. The new alignment was created by NHAI in 2011. And the work has resumed recently in 2019.

=== Public Transport ===
An easy way to move across the city is buses operated by both state-run TNSTC and many private modes of transport. More than 350 buses are running in the city. In addition to this, there are auto rickshwas and various taxi services to avail, including mobile application-based operators to move around the city and its suburbs.

Important bus terminals in the city are:

- Panjappur Integrated Bus Terminus, Tiruchirappalli
- Chathiram Bus Station
- Central Bus Station
- Srirangam Bus Terminus (under construction)
- Thiruverumbur New Bus Terminus (proposed)
- K.K. Nagar
- Thuvakkudi

Tiruchirappalli is a division under TNSTC, Kumbakonam. There are regular buses to Vellore, Karaikudi, Karur, Thanjavur, Kanniyakumari, Chennai, Madurai, Salem, Palani, Puducherry, Coimbatore, Kodaikanal and Tirupathi. Buses are also available to destinations in Karnataka and Kerala. The Karnataka State Road Transport Corporation (KSRTC) operates bus services between Bengaluru, Mysore and Tiruchirapalli on daily basis.

== Rail ==
Tiruchirappalli Railway Division is one of the divisions in Southern Railway. The Tiruchirappalli Railway Junction has five branches which connects to Kaniyakumari, Erode, Rameshwaram, Karaikal and Chennai and is one of the busiest railway junctions in Tamil Nadu, it constitutes a separate division of the Southern Railway. There are frequent trains to Chennai, Coimbatore, Thanjavur, Karur Junction, Karaikudi Kumbakonam, Mayiladuthurai, Karaikal, Chidambaram, Madurai, Vellore Cantonment, Katpadi Junction, Tirupathi, Tuticorin, Tenkasi, Kollam, Rameswaram, Bengaluru, Mysuru, Kochi, Kanyakumari, Mangaluru, Kolkata. About nine express trains operate daily on the Chord line, important among are Pallavan Express and the Rockfort Express. The Mysuru Express plies between Tiruchirappalli and Mysuru on a daily basis, stopping at Salem and Bengaluru on the way. Tiruchirappalli has rail connectivity with most important cities and towns in India. Tiruchirapalli is also proposed for monorail in mid 2023 and expected to start metro train project in Trichy by mid 2024.

== Air ==
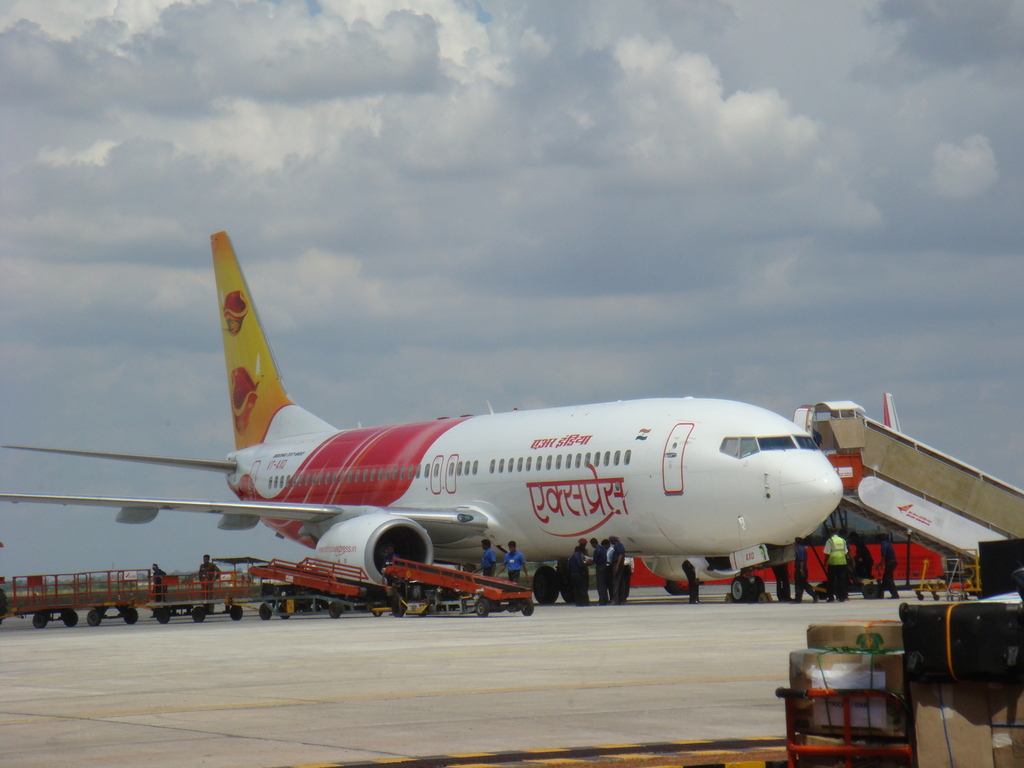
Air India Express aircraft at Tiruchirapalli International Airport

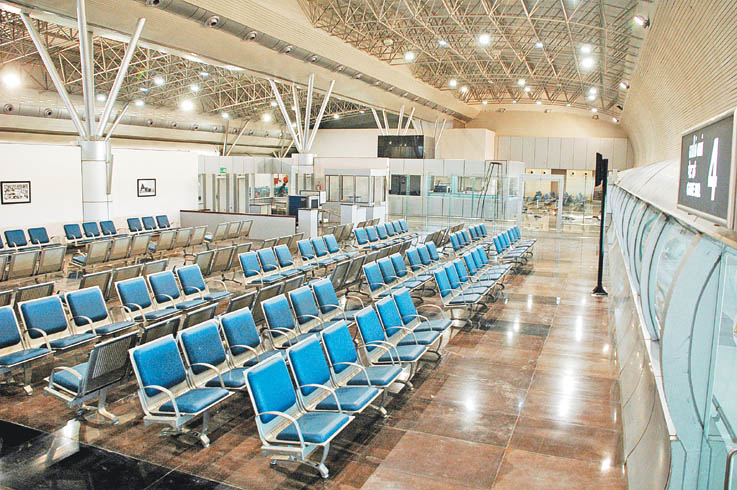
Waiting hall at Tiruchirappalli International Airport

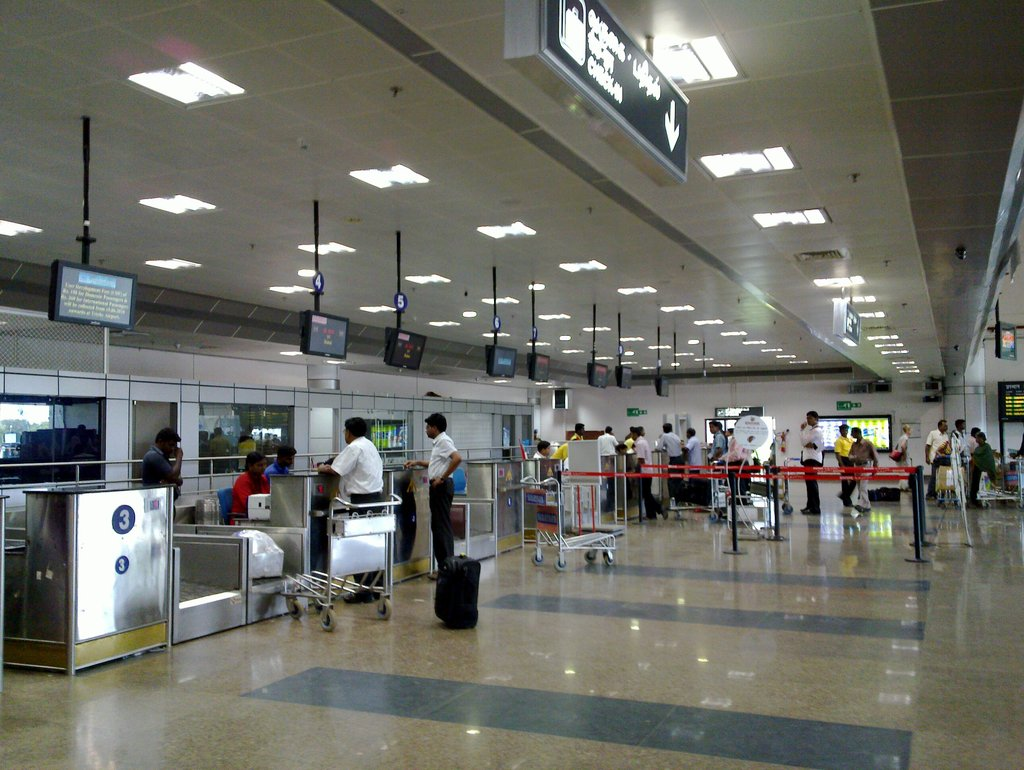
Check-in counters at the Tiruchirappalli International Airport

Tiruchirapalli International Airport (IATA: TRZ, ICAO: VOTR) is a major airport mostly serving Tiruchirapalli and adjacent districts in the state of Tamil Nadu, India. The airport, located on the NH 210 Tiruchirapalli–Rameswaram highway, is 5 km (3.1 mi) south of the city centre.

The Tiruchirapalli International Airport is the second biggest airport in Tamil Nadu after Chennai International Airport. It was first used to handle air traffic in 1938 when Tata Airlines' commercial flights stopped at Tiruchirappalli on the Karachi-Colombo route. In 1948, Air Ceylon commenced daily passenger flights between Tiruchirappalli and Colombo via Jaffna. There are regular flights to Chennai, Sri Lanka, and Dubai. Air India Express has an engineering stores complex at Tiruchirapalli International Airport for repairing aircraft.

The airport is scheduled for expansion soon as the local government has acquired the land in and around the existing airport. This expansion is expected to accommodate larger flights and also expand International operations to more countries given Tiruchirappalli is an integrated industrial hub in Tamil Nadu. The Tiruchirappalli International Airport caters for the need of 12 districts in Tamil Nadu like Tiruchirappalli, Thanjavur, Ariyalur, Perambalur, Dindigul, Karur, Karaikal (UT), Nagapattinam, Thiruvarur, Namakkal, Pudukottai and Sivaganga. In November 2011, it commenced international cargo operations, for which, the cargo terminal was built at the cost of ₹1 crore.

== See also ==
- Transport in Tamil Nadu
- Tiruchirappalli
- Tiruchirappalli Monorail
