= Tiruchirappalli Fort Railway Station =

Railway station in Tamil Nadu, India

Tiruchirappalli Fort

General information
- Location: Trichirapalli, Tamil Nadu; India
- Coordinates: 10°49′26″N 78°41′21″E
- Elevation: 83 m (272 ft) above MSL
- System: NSG–5 Indian railway station
- Lines: Tiruchirappalli railway division, Southern Railway zone

Other information
- Station code: TP
Location

The Tiruchirappalli Fort railway station (station code: TP) is an NSG–5 category Indian railway station in the Tiruchirappalli railway division of Southern Railway zone, located in the city of Trichirapalli, in the state of Tamil Nadu, India. The railway station once served the citizens of the dilapidated fort of Old City of Trichy, encompassing Big Bazaar Street, Singarathope, Bishop Heber School, Teppakulam and Tiruchirapalli Rock Fort. All that remains now is the railway station and the Main Guard Gate along West Boulevard Road in the city of Tiruchirappalli. Tiruchirapalli Fort Railway Station lies opposite to the Main Guard Gate and Tiruchirappalli Town railway station lies towards its eastern entrance.
