= Navalpattu =

- Census town
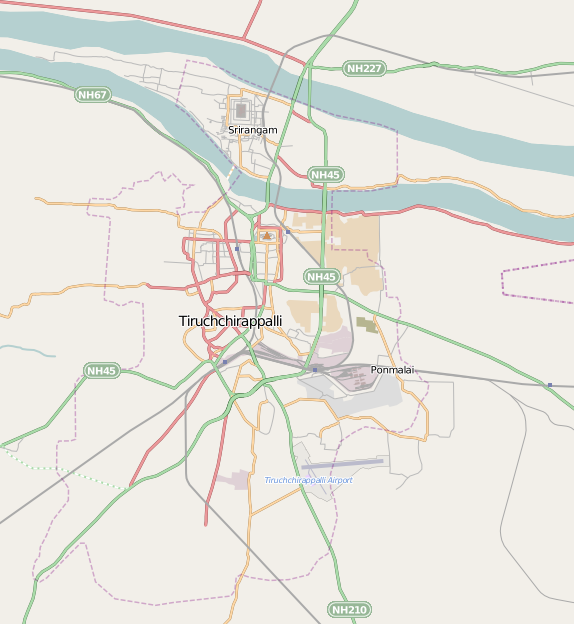
- Location in Tiruchirapalli municipality
- Coordinates: 10°45′00″N 78°46′35″E
- Country: India
- State: Tamil Nadu
- District: Tiruchirappalli

Population (2001)
  - Total: 16,020

Languages
  - Official: Tamil
- Time zone: UTC+5.30 (IST)

Navalpattu is a census town in Tiruchirappalli district in the Indian state of Tamil Nadu. Navalpattu is a part of Tiruchirappalli urban agglomeration. The city's only IT park is based here.

== Demographics ==
As of 2001 India census, Navalpattu had a population of 16,020. Males constitute 49% of the population and females 51%. Navalpattu has an average literacy rate of 77%, higher than the national average of 59.5%: male literacy is 82%, and female literacy is 71%. In Navalpattu, 9% of the population is under 6 years of age.
