= Panjapur =

Suburb area in Edamalaipatti Pudur, Tamil Nadu, India

Panjapur is an area of Tiruchirappalli suburbs of Edamalaipatti Pudur of Trichy in Tamil Nadu, India. It comes under the city limit with Tiruchirappalli city corporation and Tiruchirappalli West taluk. Ward 39 of Trichy corporation covers Panjapur. Panjappur Integrated Bus Terminus is located at this village spread over an area of 115.68 acres.
