= Mannarpuram =

- Trichy City
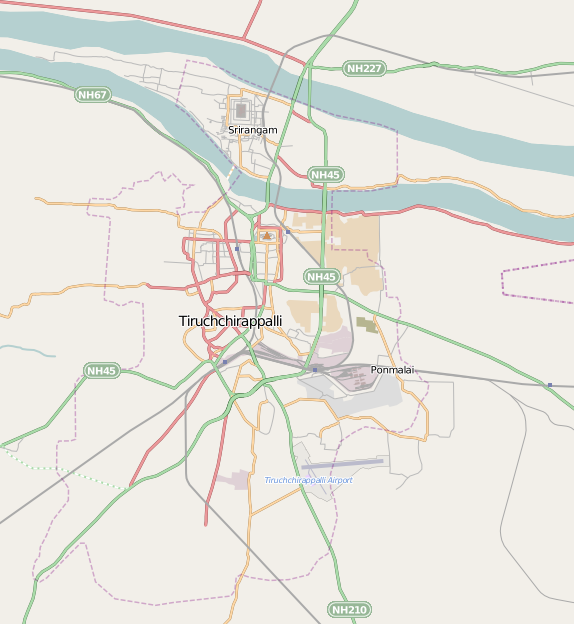
- Location within Tiruchirapalli
- Coordinates: 10°47′26″N 78°41′12″E
- Country: India
- State: Tamil Nadu
- Time zone: UTC+5.30 (IST)

Mannarpuram (Tamil: மன்னார்புரம்) is a part of the city of Tiruchirappalli in Tamil Nadu, India. The headquarters of the Trichy division of the Tamil Nadu Electricity Board (TNEB) are located here. The Trichy Cricket Association's Mannarpuram Coaching Academy, one of the city's important coaching academies is also located here.
