= Thuvakudi =

- Town
- Thuvakudi, Tiruchirapalli, Tamil Nadu
- Coordinates: 10°45′09.4″N 78°49′47.3″E
- Country: India
- State: Tamil Nadu
- District: Tiruchirappalli

Government
  - Type: Second Grade Municipality
  - Body: Thuvakudi Municipality

Area
  - Total: 14.371 km^{2} (5.549 sq mi)
- Elevation: 120 m (390 ft)

Population (2011)
  - Total: 38,887
  - Density: 2,705.9/km^{2} (7,008.3/sq mi)

Languages
  - Official: Tamil
- Time zone: UTC+5:30 (IST)
- PIN: 620015
- Vehicle registration: TN-81

Thuvakudi /θʊvɑːkʊd/ is a town in Tiruchirapalli district in the Indian state of Tamil Nadu. It is an industrial town housing more than 250 industries and is located on the National Highway NH 65 between Tiruchirapalli and Thanjavur. The town has a dry weather, making it suitable for dry crops like cotton, chillies and millets.

Thuvakudi comes under the Thiruverumbur (State Assembly Constituency) which elects a member to the Tamil Nadu Legislative Assembly once every five years and it is a part of the Tiruchirappalli Lok Sabha constituency which elects its Member of Parliament (MP) once in five years. The town is administered by the Thuvakudi municipality, which covers an area of 14.37 km^{2} (5.55 sq mi). In 2001, the town had a population of 38,887. The town is a part of the fertile Cauvery delta region, but manufacturing industries and stone quarrying are the major occupations. Roadways are the major mode of transportation to Thuvakudi and the nearest Airport is Tiruchirapalli Airport, located 25 km (16 mi) away from the town.

== Geography and climate ==
Thuvakudi is located at 10.756389°N 78.801111°E. The average elevation is 88 metres (289 ft). The topology of Thuvakudi is almost flat with a few isolated hillocks rising above the surface. The city spread over an area of 14.371 square kilometres (5.549 sq mi) is situated between Tiruchirapalli and Thanjavur. Red soil is the most common type of soil, which is conducive for dry crops like chillies, cotton and groundnut. Thuvakudi is hot and dry for at least eight months of the year. The hottest months are from March to July during which the city experiences frequent dust storms. During this period, the days are extremely warm and dry while evenings are rendered cooler due to the cold winds that blow from the south-east. Thuvakudi experiences a moderate climate from August to October, tempered by heavy rain and thundershowers, and cool and balmy climate from November to February. Fog and dew are rare and occur only during the winter season. It receives an average annual rainfall of around 850 mm (33 in)

Climate data for Thuvakudi
Month	Jan	Feb	Mar	Apr	May	Jun	Jul	Aug	Sep	Oct	Nov	Dec	Year
Mean daily maximum °C (°F)	30.1 (86.2)	32.6 (90.7)	35.1 (95.2)	36.9 (98.4)	37.4 (99.3)	36.7 (98.1)	35.7 (96.3)	35.4 (95.7)	24.5 (76.1)	32.2 (90.0)	30.1 (86.2)	29.2 (84.6)	33.8 (92.8)
Mean daily minimum °C (°F)	20.3 (68.5)	20.9 (69.6)	23.0 (73.4)	25.8 (78.4)	26.4 (79.5)	26.5 (79.7)	25.9 (78.6)	25.5 (77.9)	24.7 (76.5)	23.9 (75.0)	22.7 (72.9)	21.2 (70.2)	23.9 (75.0)
Average precipitation mm (inches)	14.3 (0.56)	5.4 (0.21)	9.5 (0.37)	50.5 (1.99)	65.2 (2.57)	34.9 (1.37)	60.6 (2.39)	85.5 (3.37)	146.6 (5.77)	191.5 (7.54)	131.8 (5.19)	84.4 (3.32)	880.2 (34.65)
Source: IMD

== Demographics ==
Religious census
Religion	Percent(%)
Hindu	83.68%
Muslim	5.05%
Christian	10.8%
Sikh	0.05%
Buddhist	0.03%
Jain	0.04%
Other	0.33%
No religion	0.03%

Historical population
Year	Pop.	±%
2001	35,428	—
2004	37,210	+5.0%
2008	38,970	+4.7%
2011	38,887	−0.2%
Sources: 2001 – 2008; 2011

According to 2011 census, Thuvakudi had a population of 38,887 with a sex-ratio of 842 females for every 1,000 males, much above the national average of 929. A total of 3,261 were under the age of six, constituting 1,667 males and 1,594 females. Scheduled Castes and Scheduled Tribes accounted for 17.58% and .99% of the population respectively. The average literacy of the town was 81.56%, compared to the national average of 72.99%. The town had a total of : 9402 households. There were a total of 13,911 workers, comprising 150 cultivators, 137 main agricultural labourers, 89 in house hold industries, 11,396 other workers, 2,139 marginal workers, 21 marginal cultivators, 108 marginal agricultural labourers, 52 marginal workers in household industries and 1,958 other marginal workers. As per the religious census of 2011, Thuvakudi (M) had 83.68% Hindus, 5.05% Muslims, 10.8% Christians, 0.05% Sikhs, 0.03% Buddhists, 0.04% Jains, 0.33% following other religions and 0.03% following no religion or did not indicate any religious preference.

In 2009, 45% population resided in slums, which is much higher than the normative standard of 10%. The sex ratio of the town is 914 and the literacy rate is 78%. In 2001, the population density of the town was 2465 persons/km^{2} and most of the residential area was concentrated around the Thuvakudi Malai area. The centre of the town and Thuvakudi Malai are the major residential centres. The workforce is 31% of the total population and 90% of the working population is engaged in tertiary sector activities. The town has a total area of 1,437 hectares (3,550 acres), and in 2001 65% of the land was used by industries like SIDCO, BHEL, industrial corridors and educational institutes like NIT and Government polytechnic.

== Municipal administration and politics ==
Municipality officials
Chairman	E. Kayambu
Vice-Chairman	A. Rajalingam
Commissioner	K.N. Sudha
Elected members
Member of Legislative Assembly	P.Anbil Mahesh Poiyamozhil
Member of Parliament	S Tirunavukarasu

Thuvakudi was constituted as a Town Panchayat and promoted to a third-grade municipality in 2004. It was promoted to a second-grade municipality in 2010. The Thuvakudi municipality has 21 wards covering an area of 14.7 km^{2} (5.7 sq mi) and there is an elected councillor for each of those wards. The functions of the municipality are devolved into six departments: general administration/personnel, Engineering, Revenue, Public Health, city planning and Information Technology (IT). All these departments are under the control of a Municipal Commissioner who is the executive head. The legislative powers are vested in a body of 21 members, one each from the 21 wards. The legislative body is headed by an elected Chairperson assisted by a Deputy Chairperson.

Thuvakudi comes under the Thiruverumbur assembly constituency and it elects a member to the Tamil Nadu Legislative Assembly once every five years. From the 1977 elections, All India Anna Dravid Munnetra Kazhagam (AIADMK) won the assembly seat four times (in 1980, 1984, 1991 and 2011 elections); Dravida Munnetra Kazhagam three times (DMK, 1977, 1996, 2001 and 2006 elections) and Communist Party of India (Marxist) (CPI(M) 1989). The current MLA of the constituency is Anbil Mahesh Poyyamozhi from DMK.

Law and order in the town in maintained by the Tiruchirapalli division of the Tamil Nadu Police headed by a Deputy Superintendent. There is one police stations in the town. There are special units like prohibition enforcement, district crime, social justice and human rights, district crime records and special branch that operate at the district level police division headed by a Superintendent of Police.

== Economy and transportation ==
Thuvakudi is an industrial town. The SIDCO industrial estate encompasses more than 250 industrial units which are located in and around the town. Bharat Heavy Electricals (BHEL) has a boiler plant and seamless steel tube processing centre, both of which are located within Thuvakudi municipal limits. Thuvakudi, historically had a lot of stone quarries.

The Thuvakudi municipality maintains 29.56 km (18.37 mi) of road. The town has 7.65 km (4.75 mi) concrete road, 10.4 km (6.5 mi) bituminous road, 5.95 km (3.70 mi) of WBM roads and 5.56 km (3.45 mi) of gravel roads. The town is located in the National Highway NH 65, at a distance of 25 kilometres (16 mi) from Tiruchirapalli and 30 km (19 mi) from Thanjavur. There are three major roads from Thuvakudi: Trichy-Thanjavur National Highways NH 65, Thuvakudi Malai-Ayyampatti State Highways and Thuvakudi-Kiranur state Highways. The Thuvakudi bus stand is located on NH 65 and has 12 bus shelters. Thuvakudi is served by town bus service, which provides connectivity within the town and the suburbs. The nearest railway station is Thiruverumbur. The nearest local and international airport is the Tiruchirappalli International Airport

== Education and utility services ==
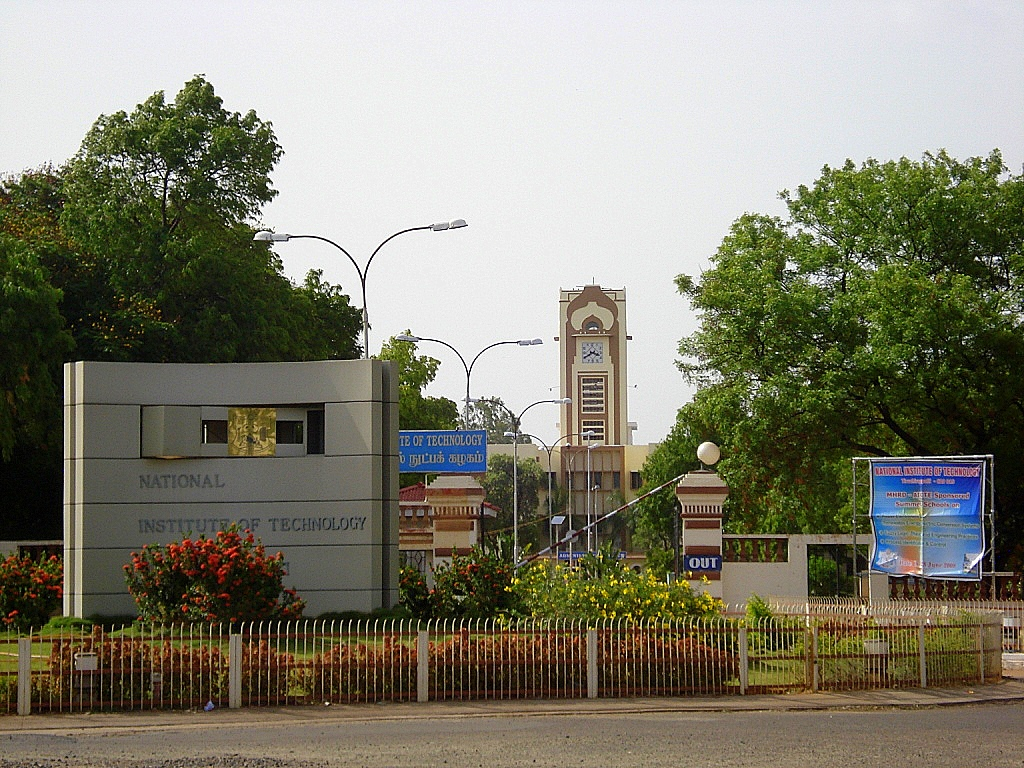
The National Institute of Technology, one of the premier engineering institutes in the country

In 2011, there were two primary schools, two middle schools and one higher secondary school. The Government Arts College in Thuvakudi Malai, Government Polytechnic, Trec-step, State Institute of Hotel Management & Catering Technology (SIHMCT), formerly known as Food Craft Institute (FCI) and National Institute of Technology, Tiruchirappalli (NITT) are the colleges & institutes present in the town.

Electricity supply to Thuvakudi is regulated and distributed by the Tamil Nadu Electricity Board (TNEB). The town along with its suburbs is a part of Tiruchirapalli Electricity Distribution Circle. Water supply is provided by the Thuvakudi Municipality from the Kollidam river through two overhead tanks. In the period 2000–2001, a total of 2.2 million litres of water was supplied every day for households in the town. As per the municipal data for 2011, about 8.85 metric tonnes of solid waste were collected from Thuvakudi every day by door-to-door collection and subsequently the source segregation and dumping was carried out by the sanitary department of the Thuvakudi municipality. There is no underground drainage system in the town and the sewerage system for disposal of sullage is through septic tanks, open drains and public conveniences. In 2011, the municipality maintained a total of 1,126 street lamps: 184 sodium lamps, four mercury vapour lamps and 990 tube lights. The municipality operates one market and a bus stand.

== Notes ==
=== Footnotes ===
- The municipalities in Tamil Nadu are graded special, selection, grade I and grade II based on income and population.
