= Chintamani, Tiruchirappalli =

Neighbourhood in Tamil Nadu, India

Chintamani is a neighbourhood of the city of Tiruchirappalli in Tamil Nadu, India.
