= Inam Kulathur =

Village in Tamil Nadu, India

- village
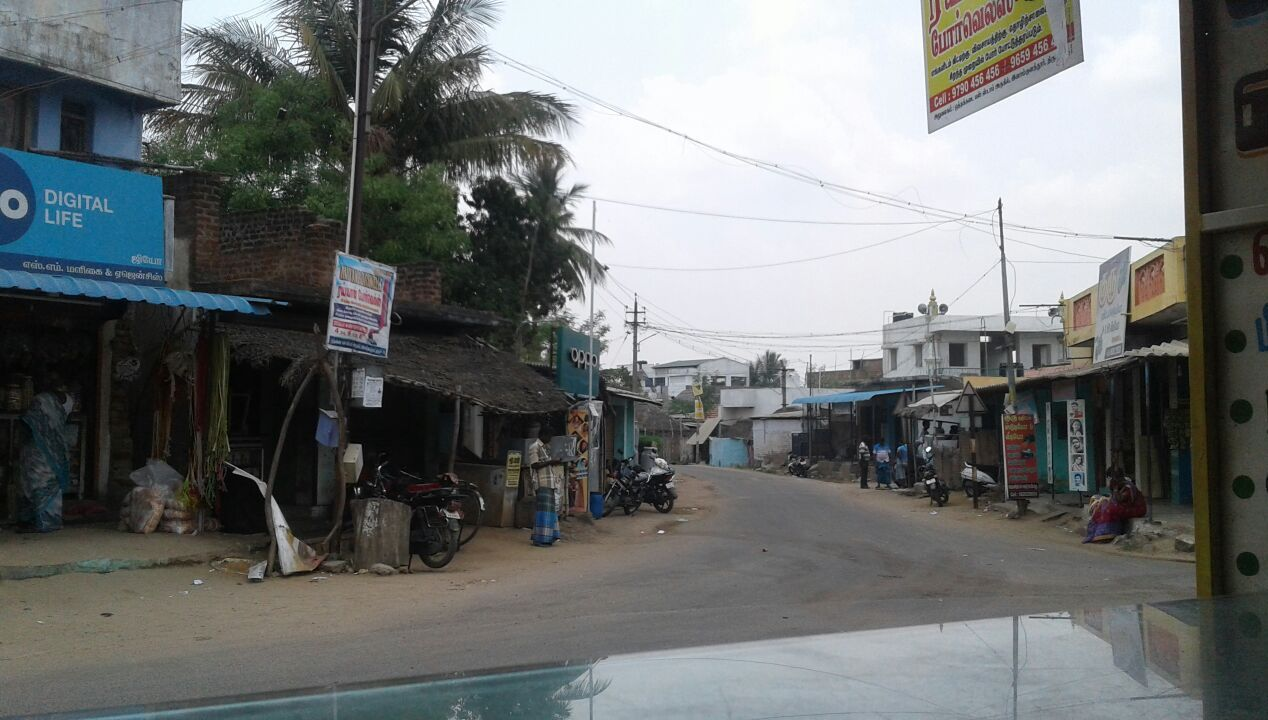

- Location in Tamil Nadu, India Inam Kulathur (India)
- Coordinates: 10°42′13″N 78°31′56″E
- Country: India

Population
  - Total: 11,083
- Time zone: UTC+5:30 (IST)
- Postal code: 620009

Inam Kulathur is a census town in the Tiruchirappalli district of the Indian state of Tamil Nadu. It is situated on the Tiruchirappalli–Dindigul National Highway and forms part of the Tiruchirappalli urban agglomeration. According to the 2011 Census of India, the town had a population of 11,083

This area was covered by an agricultural reservoir of approximately 300 acres. Inam Kulathur also refers to the surrounding area.

Inam Kulathur was ruled by the Early Cholas, Early Pandyas, Later Cholas, Delhi Sultanate, Madurai Sultanate, Arcot Nawab and the British, prior to the formation of the Republic of India. Tiruchirappalli played a critical role in the Ponnar - Sangar history.

== Geography ==
Inam Kulathur is located south of Tiruchirappalli city and is connected by road through the Tiruchirappalli–Dindigul National Highway. Its location has contributed to residential and commercial development in recent years.

== Economy ==
The factories of Indian Oil Corporation Bottling Point and Janani Marbles and granites are located in Inam Kulathur.

The village has basic facilities such as railway station, government hospital, government higher secondary school, police station, post office, government library and BSNL telephone exchange.

The majority of the peoples are working in IOCL, Southern Railway, tailoring, abroad and the weekly market held on every Tuesday. Once upon a time Inam kulathur is having more than 300 readymade manufacturing centers and noe few only there like BISMI GARMENTS(Specialist in school uniform manufacturing) and RB TRADERS. near about 2000 tailoring machines were run in the year of before 2000s. Previously Beedi company also act as important economy source in Inam Kulathur.

One IPS officer born in this village Shri.A.Natarajan IPS currently working in ADGP Jharkhand Cadre, Jharkhand Police.

Some soldiers are working in Indian Army, Indian Navy, Central Reserve Police Force, Border Security Force, and Tamilnadu Police.

== Transport ==
The village is connected to bus and train. Direct bus services run from Inam kulathur to Trichy, Srirangam, Manapparai and Viralimalai.

The village has a railway station in Trichy to Dindigul main railway line. The railway station has rail connectivity to Trichy, Madurai, Dindigul, Tirunelveli, Villupuram, Mayiladuthurai and Sengottai.

The nearest airport is Tiruchirappalli International Airport. The distance is 25 km.

== Education ==
The following educational institutions are located in and around Inam Kulathur

- NR International school
- Awniya public school
- Moulana Jamali matric school
- Vikas Arts and science college
- Nehru College of Nursing
- R.V.S-KVK architecture college
- RVS-KVK institute of management
- H.M.Y Government Higher Secondary School
- Panchayat union high school
- Jamaliyaa Arabic college
- Assalam Islamic College
- JJ College of Engineering and Technology
- Shivani Engineering college
- JJ Polytechnic college
- Shivani Polytechnic college
- KMC nursing college
- NR IAS Academy
