= Tiruchirappalli Town railway station =

Railway station in Tamil Nadu, India

Tiruchirappalli Town

General information
- Location: Trichirapalli, Tamil Nadu; India
- Coordinates: 10°49′29″N 78°41′20″E
- Elevation: 83 m (272 ft) above MSL
- System: NSG–6 Indian railway station
- Lines: Tiruchirappalli railway division, Southern Railway zone

Other information
- Station code: TPTN
Location

The Tiruchirapalli Town railway station (station code:TPTN) is an NSG–6 category Indian railway station in Tiruchirappalli railway division of Southern Railway zone. It is the railway station located near Rockfort. It also acts as a major source of connectivity to Chathiram Bus Station.
