= Thillai Nagar =

Neighbourhood in Tiruchirappalli, Tamil Nadu, India

- Neighbourhood
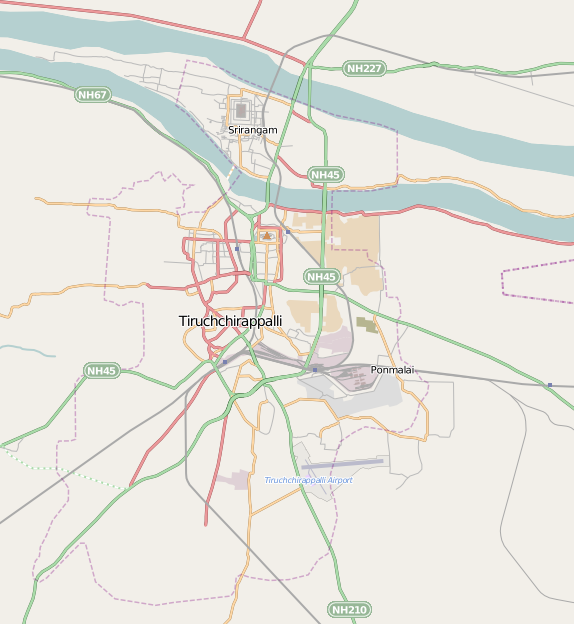
- Location within Tiruchirapalli
- Coordinates: 10°48′47″N 78°40′35″E
- Country: India
- City: Tiruchirappalli
- State: Tamil Nadu
- Time zone: UTC+5.30 (IST)

Thillai Nagar (Tamil: தில்லை நகர்) is the poshest locality in Tiruchirappalli in the Indian state of Tamil Nadu. It is a prominent commercial and residential locality in Trichy. Being the most busiest area in Trichy city, it has a daily floating population of 5 lakhs. The locality is also a home to many of the city's VIPs and government officials. The area has all the top branded showrooms in the city. Also with a well planned urban infrastructure in place, surrounded by trees and its connectivity with all modern amenities such as schools, parks, banks, recreation centres, hospitals, hotels, temples, restaurants, shopping centres, police station, bus stops and Trichy Fort Railway station etc. makes the locality an elite residential place.

== Politics ==
Thillai Nagar along with the adjacent Shastri Road forms the 56th Ward in the Tiruchirappalli City Municipal Corporation represented by an elected Councillor Ms. Anandajothi representing AIADMK. And this Ward wholly is a part of the Tiruchirappalli West Assembly Constituency in the Tamil Nadu Legislative Assembly. This was named in the year 1990.
