= K. K. Nagar, Tiruchirappalli =

Neighbourhood in Tiruchirappalli district, Tamil Nadu, India

K. K. Nagar கே.கே.நகர்
- Neighbourhood
- Nickname: Kalaignar Karunanidhi Nagar
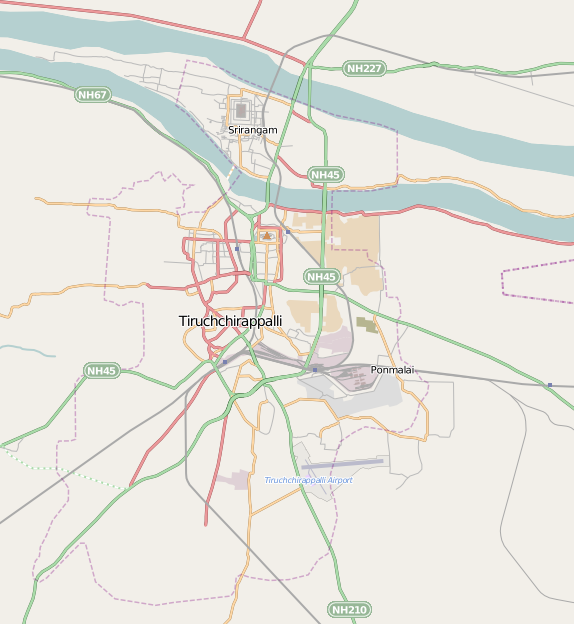
- Location within Tiruchirapalli
- Coordinates: 10°45′45″N 78°41′19″E
- Country: India
- State: Tamil Nadu
- Established: 1970

Area
  - Total: 1.9 sq mi (5 km^{2})
- Elevation: 289 ft (88 m)

Population
  - Total: 30,000
  - Density: 16,000/sq mi (6,000/km^{2})
- Time zone: UTC+5:30 (IST)
- Postal code: 620021
- Website: www.trichycorporation.gov.in

K. K. Nagar or Kalaignar Karunanidhi Nagar is a residential part of Tiruchirappalli City in Tamil Nadu, India. The K. K. Nagar neighbourhood is near the Tiruchirappalli International Airport, and is the most densely populated ward in the city and also the most populous ward in the city of Tiruchirapalli. It is a part of T.C.C (Tiruchirapalli City Corporation) since 1994.

== Infrastructure ==
The K.K. Nagar neighbourhood is linked to the rest of Tiruchirappalli by several bus routes, and is home to 21 schools and 2 colleges. The environment hosts numerous flora and the pollution is very low compared to the rest of Tiruchirappalli. K. K. Nagar is primarily a residential area but there has been development of the area into a commercial hub in recent years. K. K. Nagar officially consists of four major suburbs, namely Sundar Nagar, LIC Colony, K. Sathanur & mainland K. K. Nagar. The Tiruchirappalli International Airport is 2.7 km via the straight Wireless Road from mainland K. K. Nagar. It also has some rural areas like Udaiyaanpatti, Ichukaamalaipatti, Olaiyur, Vadugapatti. A Semi ring road of Tiruchirappalli city are also being constructed along Rural areas of K.K.Nagar. There is no area other than K.K.Nagar in Trichy has both rural and developed urban area. City infrastructure in the north of K.K.Nagar which is from Kajamalai to Thendral nagar in south of K.K.Nagar and rural area starts in the south. K.K.Nagar consists four important landmarks in its four Direction Tiruchirappalli International Airport in East, Future busy ring road on South, NH 45B Trichy Madurai Highway in East, Anna Stadium on North. Many important Institutions are also in Kalaignar karunanidhi Nagar. Important schools like Alpha Group of Schools, SBIOA, Velammal Bodhi Campus, Periyar Nootrandu Kalvi valaagam, Jegan Matha Matriculation Higher Secondary school are location here and two colleges are also located which are EVR Periyar Arts and Science College, AIMAN College. The nature beauty is also seen in K.K.Nagar. The agricultural land in Sathanur and Vadugapatti, Lakes of Sathanur and Vadugapatti, Pond of Olaiyur, Mayanur Barrage Canal which runs from Mayanur, Karur District to Thanjavur district. This canal crossing Mudikandam and enters Rural areas of K.K.Nagar. It enters in Olaiyur, crossing Vadugapatti, Udaiyaanpatti and is being continue in Mathur. RPF (Railway Protection Force) Training centre in K.K.Nagar. In early 80s and 90s it consists of all kind of transport except water transport in K.K.Nagar. Few years ago Udaiyaanpatti, a rural area of K.K.Nagar has a Railway Station with a name Udaiyaanpatti. Early 2000s This station has less frequency of patronage and finally it is demolished. But some buildings of the station are existed still now. K.K.Nagar bus stand for Bus transport and Tiruchirapalli International Airport for Air Transport. It also has one of the important warehouses in Trichy city.

== Amenities ==
K. K. Nagar has a Sub Registrar's Office for all demographic & registration purposes. There is a post office, and sub-urban supermarkets and many food outlets. There are a couple of parks owned and maintained by the TCC and a variety of temples, a church and a grand mosque.

Nagar houses educational institutions as the Acharya international school, Alpha Group of Institutions, Orchard school, Akara World School and The Periyar Manniyammai School & College.

== Demography ==
The population of this area is about 30,000 as of 2013. The population of K.K.Nagar predominantly follows Hindu religion, but also a significant amount of Muslims are found as well as some Christians.
