= Transport in Tamil Nadu =

Tamil Nadu, a state in South India, has a developed, dense, and modern transportation infrastructure, encompassing both public and private transport. Its capital city Chennai is well-connected by land, sea, and air and serves as a major hub for entry into South India.

== Road ==
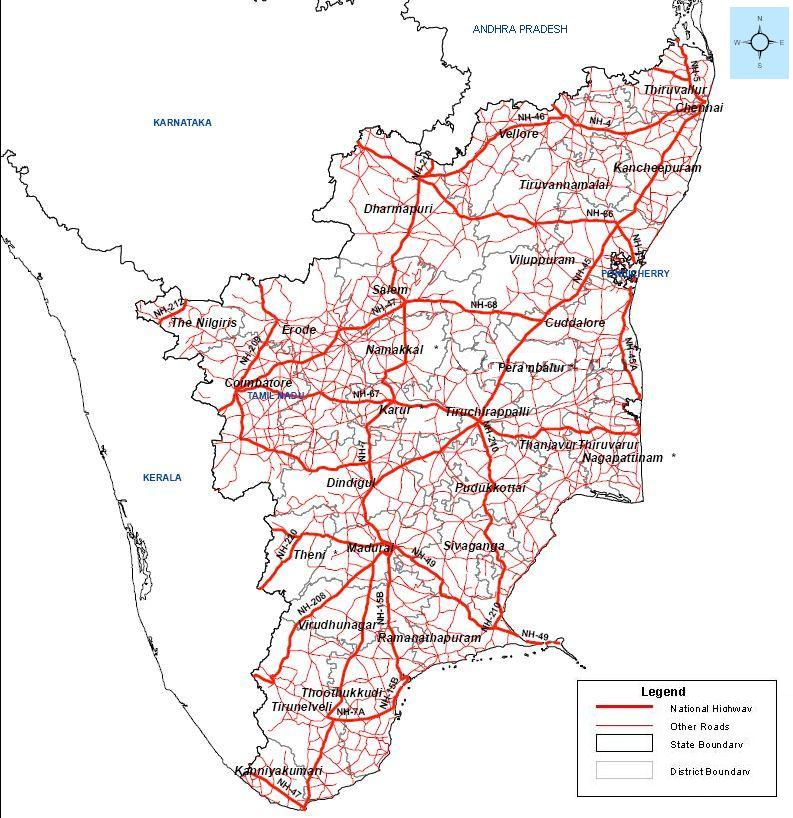
Map indicating Highways network of Tamil Nadu

Tamil Nadu has an extensive road network covering about 2.71 lakh km as of 2023 with a road density of 2,084.71 kilometres (1,295.38 mi) per 1000 km^{2} which is higher than the national average of 1,926.02 kilometres (1,196.77 mi) per 1000 km^{2}. The Highways Department (HD) of the state was established in April 1946 and was later renamed as Highways Department on 30 October 2008. The agency is primarily responsible for construction and maintenance of national highways, state highways, major district roads and other roads in the state. It operates through eleven wings with 120 divisions and 450 subdivisions. The agency maintains 73,187 kilometres (45,476 mi) of highways in the state.

Road length in TN
Type	NH	SH	MDR	ODR	OR	Total
Length (km)	6,805	12,291	12,034	42,057	197,542	271,000

=== National highways ===
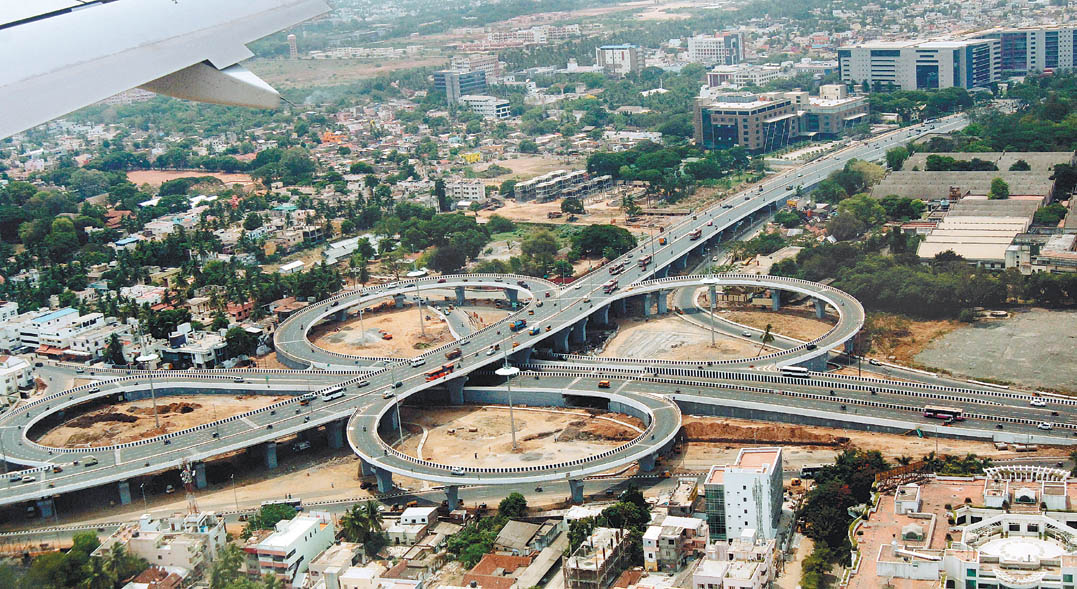
Kathipara flyover Cloverleaf interchange in Chennai

The ‘’National Highways Wing’’ of the highways department of Tamil Nadu was established in 1971 to look after the works of improving, maintaining and renewing of National Highways laid down by National Highways Authority of India (NHAI). There are 48 national highways of length 6,805 kilometres (4,228 mi) in the state.

National Highway length in Tamil Nadu
Lanes	Two	Four	Six	Eight	Total
Length (km)	3,814	2,649	333	9	6,805

=== State highways ===
Roads which connect district headquarters, important towns and national highways in the state are classified as state highways. Construction and maintenance wing of the highways department is responsible for the construction, maintenance of the state highways. The wing has eight circles namely Chennai, Coimbatore, Madurai, Salem, Tiruchirappalli, Tirunelveli, Tiruppur and Villupuram.

State Highway length in Tamil Nadu
Lanes	One	Intermediate	Two	Four	Six	Total
Length (km)	39	366	10,170	1,466	250	12,291

=== Other Roads ===
Other roads include major district roads (MDR), other district roads (ODR), rural & sugarcane roads and special roads such as East Coast Road, IT Expressway, Ennore-Manali Road Improvement Project (EMRIP), Chennai Port – Maduravoyal Expressway and Outer Ring Road Project. These roads provide linkage between various towns and centers within districts and connectivity to respective district and taluk headquarters.

=== Vehicle transport ===
As of 2020, Tamil Nadu had 32.1 million registered vehicles.

Registered vehicle count
Year	2007	2010	2015	2020
Count (mn)	10.98	14.06	22.51	32.1

=== Public transport ===
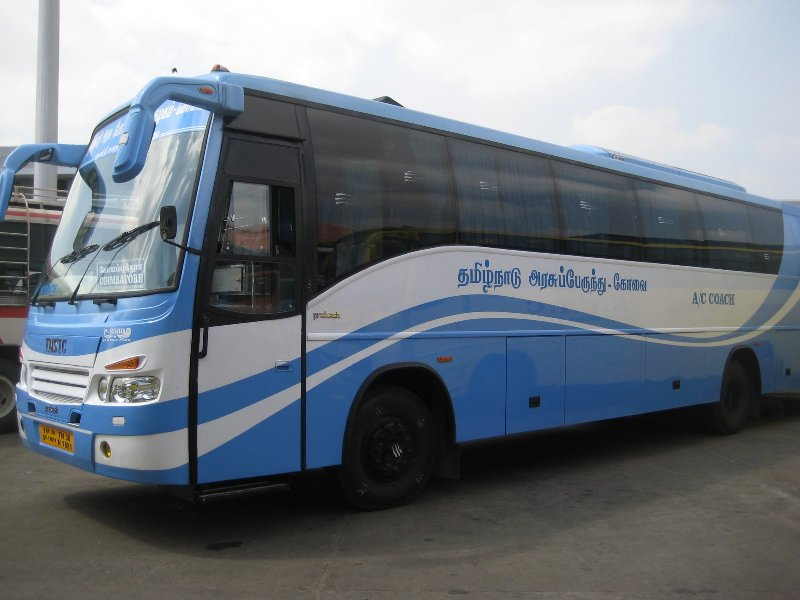
An air conditioned bus operated by SETC

As of 2020, 32,598 buses are operated with the state transport units operating 20,946 buses along with 7,596 private buses and 4,056 mini buses. Tamil Nadu State Transport Corporation (TNSTC) run by Government of Tamil Nadu is the primary public transport bus operator in the state. It was established in 1947 when private buses operating in Madras presidency were nationalized by the government. It operates buses along intra and inter state bus routes, as well as city routes. There are eight divisions of TNSTC including Metropolitan Transport Corporation in Chennai and State Express Transport Corporation. State Express Transport Corporation Limited (SETC), established in 1980, runs long-distance express services exceeding 250 km and above. It links important cities and other historical, religious and commercial towns, and adjoining states of Andhra Pradesh, Karnataka, Kerala and the Union Territory of Puducherry. SETC operates various classes of services such as semi-deluxe, ultra-deluxe and air-conditioned with advance booking and reservation on all of its routes.

== Rail ==
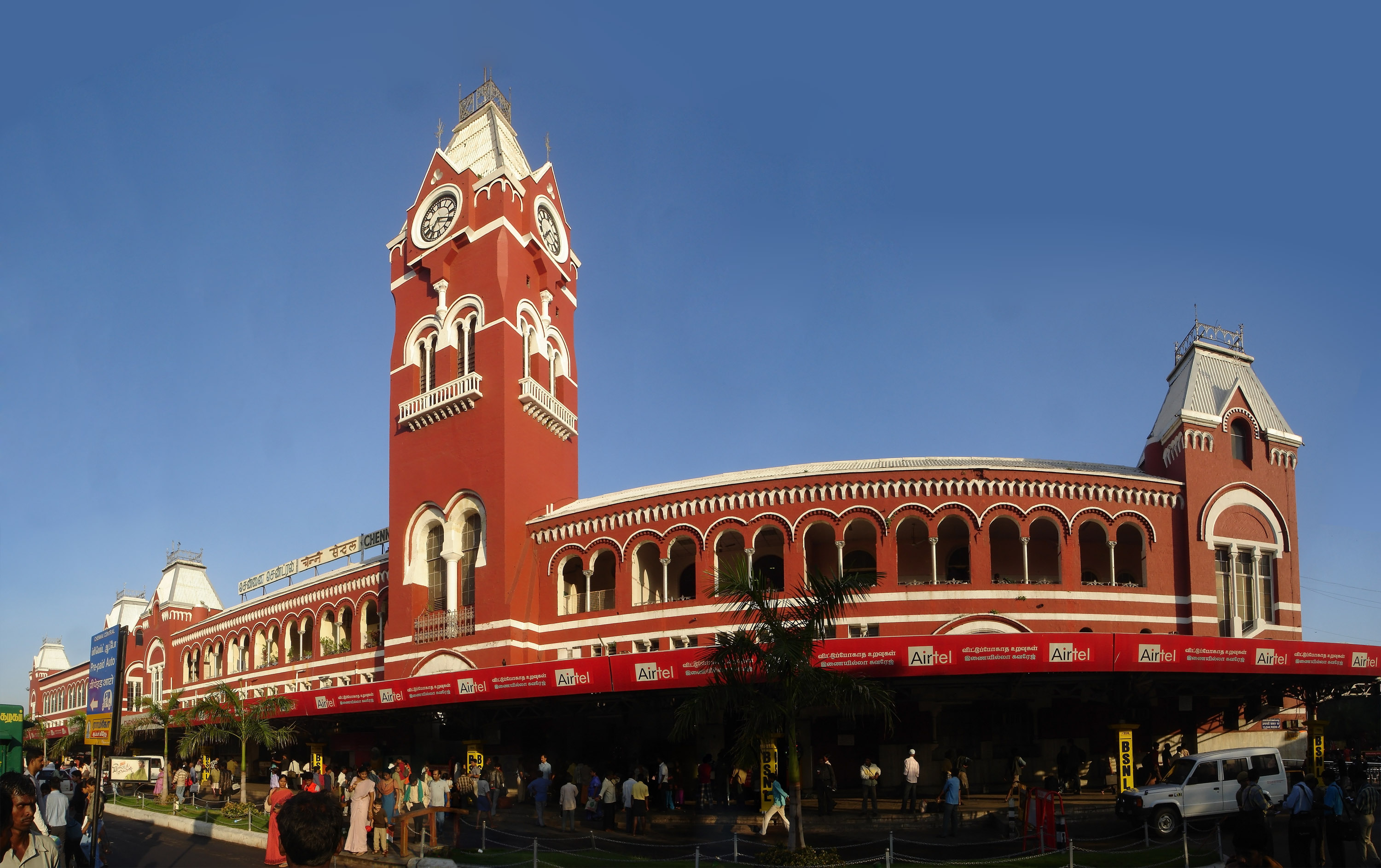
Chennai Central, one of the major railway stations

The rail network in Tamil Nadu forms a part of Southern Railway of Indian Railways. Southern Railway is headquartered in Chennai and there are four divisions in the state namely Chennai, Tiruchirappalli, Madurai and Salem. As of 2023, the state had a total railway track length of 5,601 km (3,480 mi) covering a route length of 3,858 km (2,397 mi). There are 532 railway stations in the state with Chennai Central, Chennai Egmore, Coimbatore Junction and Madurai Junction being the top revenue earning stations. Indian railways also has a coach manufacturing unit at Chennai, electric locomotive sheds at Arakkonam, Erode and Royapuram, diesel locomotive sheds at Erode, Tiruchirappalli and Tondiarpet, Steam locomotive shed at Coonoor along with various maintenance depots.

Railway in Tamil Nadu
Route length (km)					Track length (km)		
Broad Gauge			Metre Gauge	Total	Broad Gauge	Metre Gauge	Total
Electrified	Non electrified	Total	Metre Gauge	Total	Broad Gauge	Metre Gauge	Total
3,476	336	3,812	46	3,858	5,555	46	5,601

=== Suburban and MRTS ===
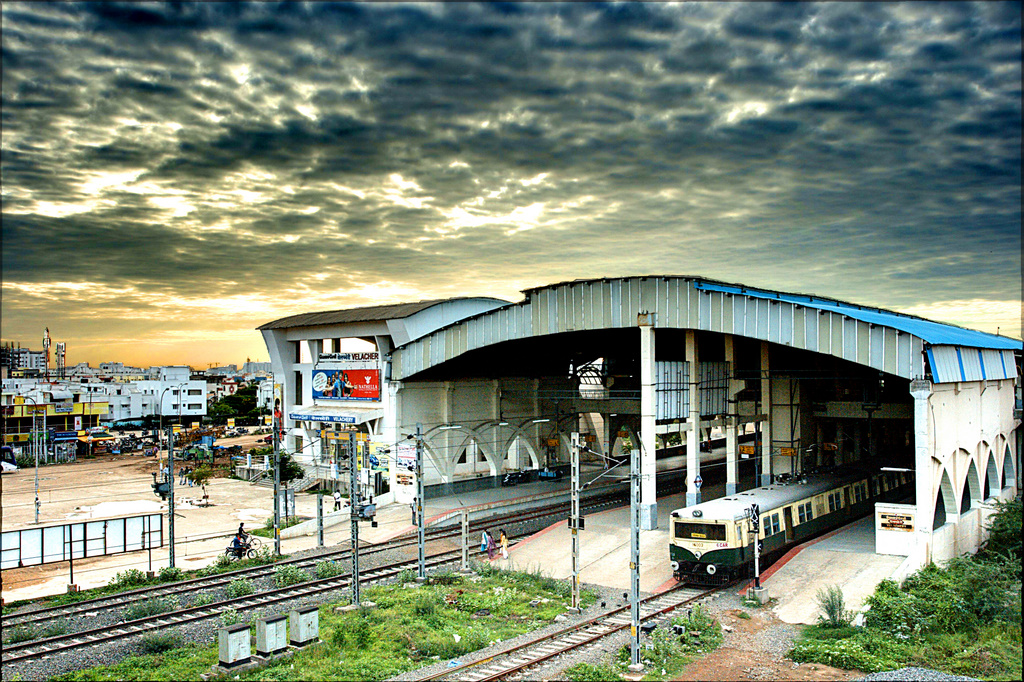
Chennai MRTS was the first MRTS system in India

Chennai has a well-established suburban railway network operated by Southern railway, which was established in 1928. The Mass Rapid Transit System (MRTS) is an elevated urban mass transit system established in 1995 operating on a single line from Chennai Beach to Velachery.

System	Lines	Stations	Length	Opened
Chennai Suburban	3	53	212 km (132 mi)	1928
Chennai MRTS	1	17	19.715 km (12.250 mi)	1995

=== Metro ===
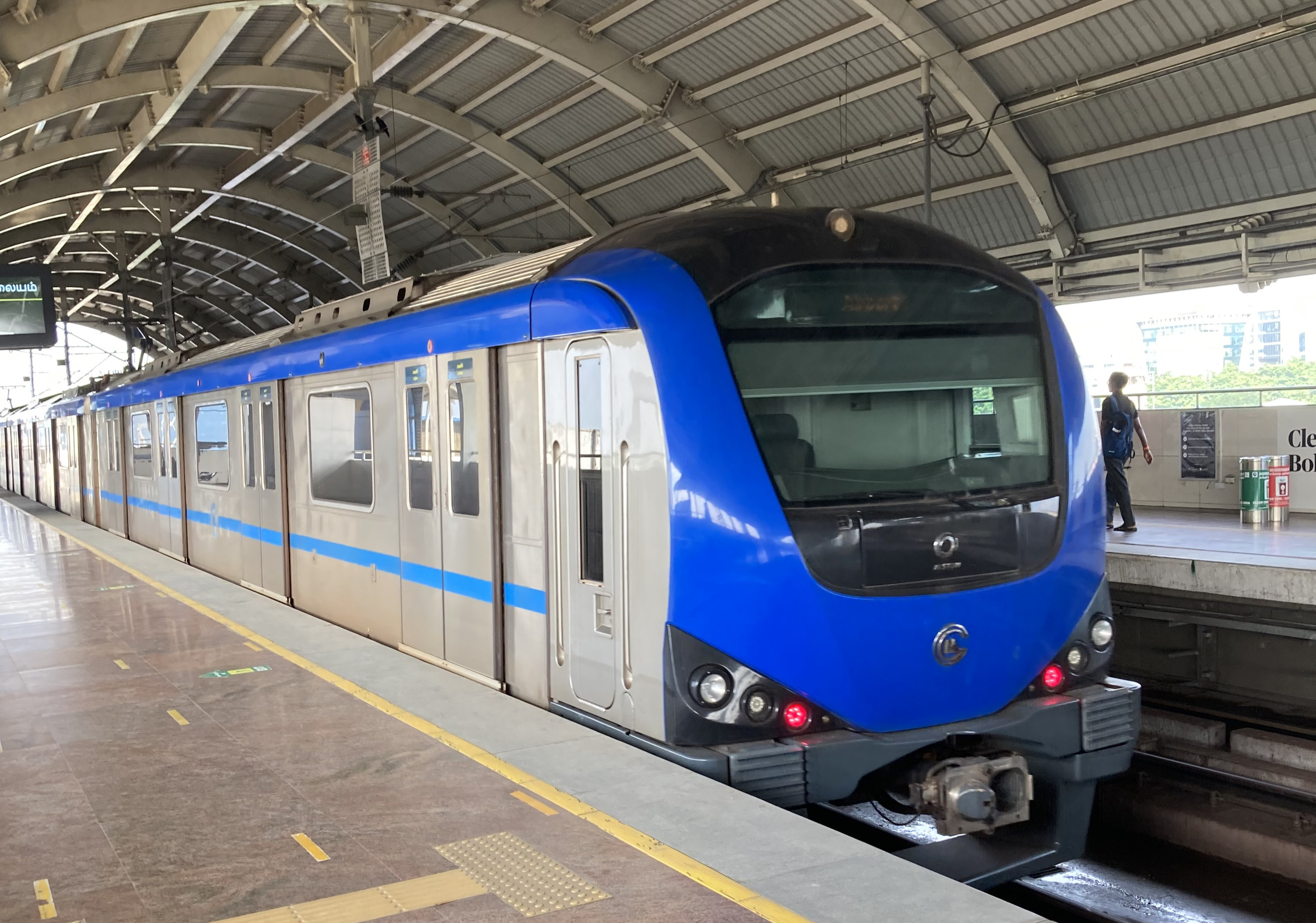
Chennai Metro is the only metro system operational in the state

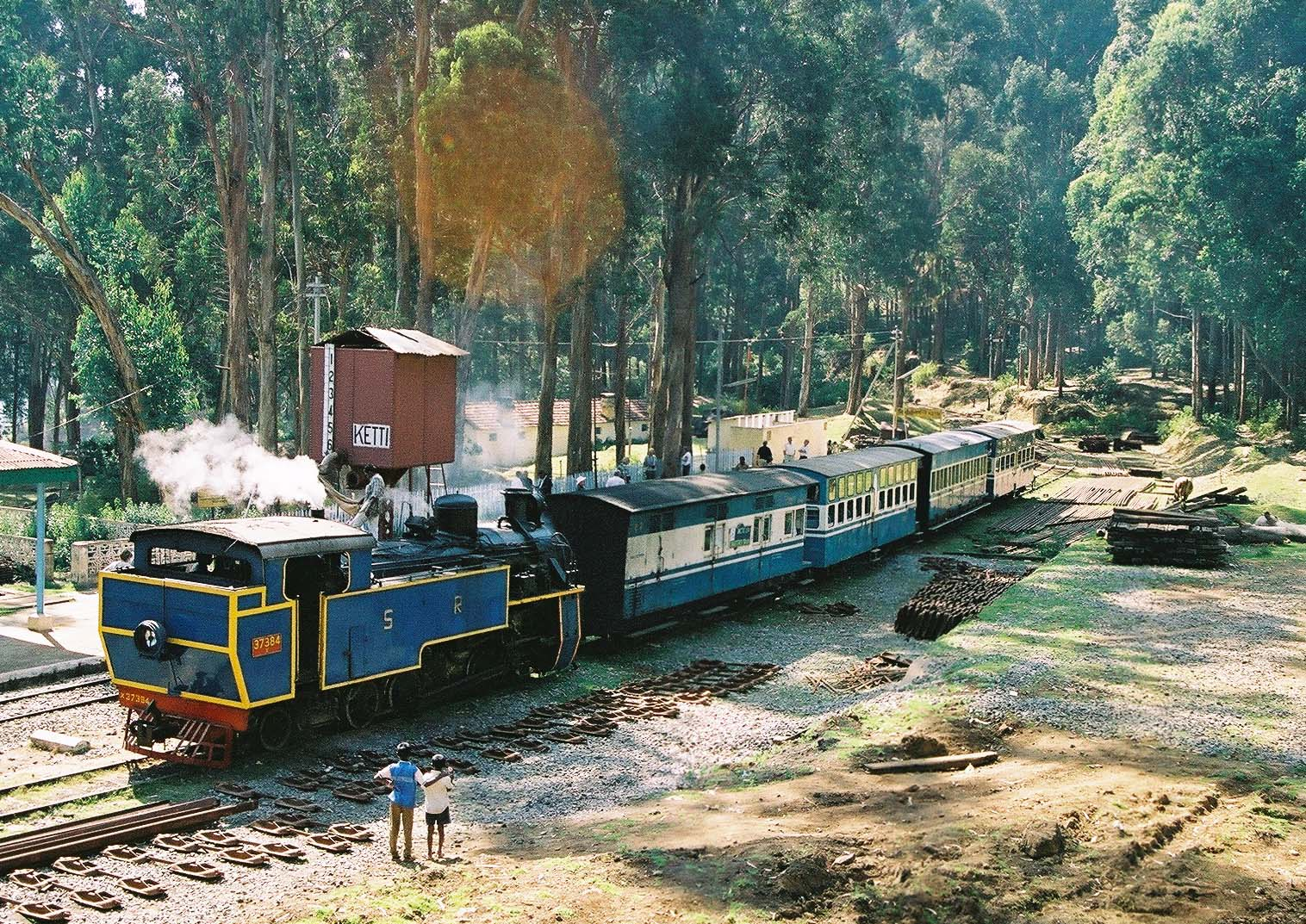
NMR is the only rack railway in India and a World Heritage Site

Chennai Metro is a rapid transit rail system in Chennai which was opened in 2015. As of 2023, the metro system consists of two operational lines operating across 54.1 km (33.6 mi) with 41 stations. Chennai metro system is being expanded with a proposed addition of three more lines and extension of 116.1 km (72.1 mi). Rapid rail projects for Coimbatore and Madurai have been proposed.

Line	Terminal		Opened	Length (km)	Stations
Blue Line	Wimco Nagar	Chennai Airport	21 September 2016	32.65	26
Green Line	Chennai Central	St. Thomas Mount	29 June 2015	22	17
Total				54.65	41

=== Mountain railway ===
Nilgiri Mountain Railway is a 1,000 mm (3 ft 3 3/8 in) metre gauge railway in Nilgiris district connecting Mettupalayam and Udagamandalam. It was built by the British in 1908 and is operated by the Southern Railways. It is the only rack railway in India and operates on its own fleet of steam locomotives between Coonoor and Udhagamandalam. In July 2005, UNESCO added the Nilgiri Mountain Railway as an extension to the World Heritage Site of Mountain Railways of India

== Air ==
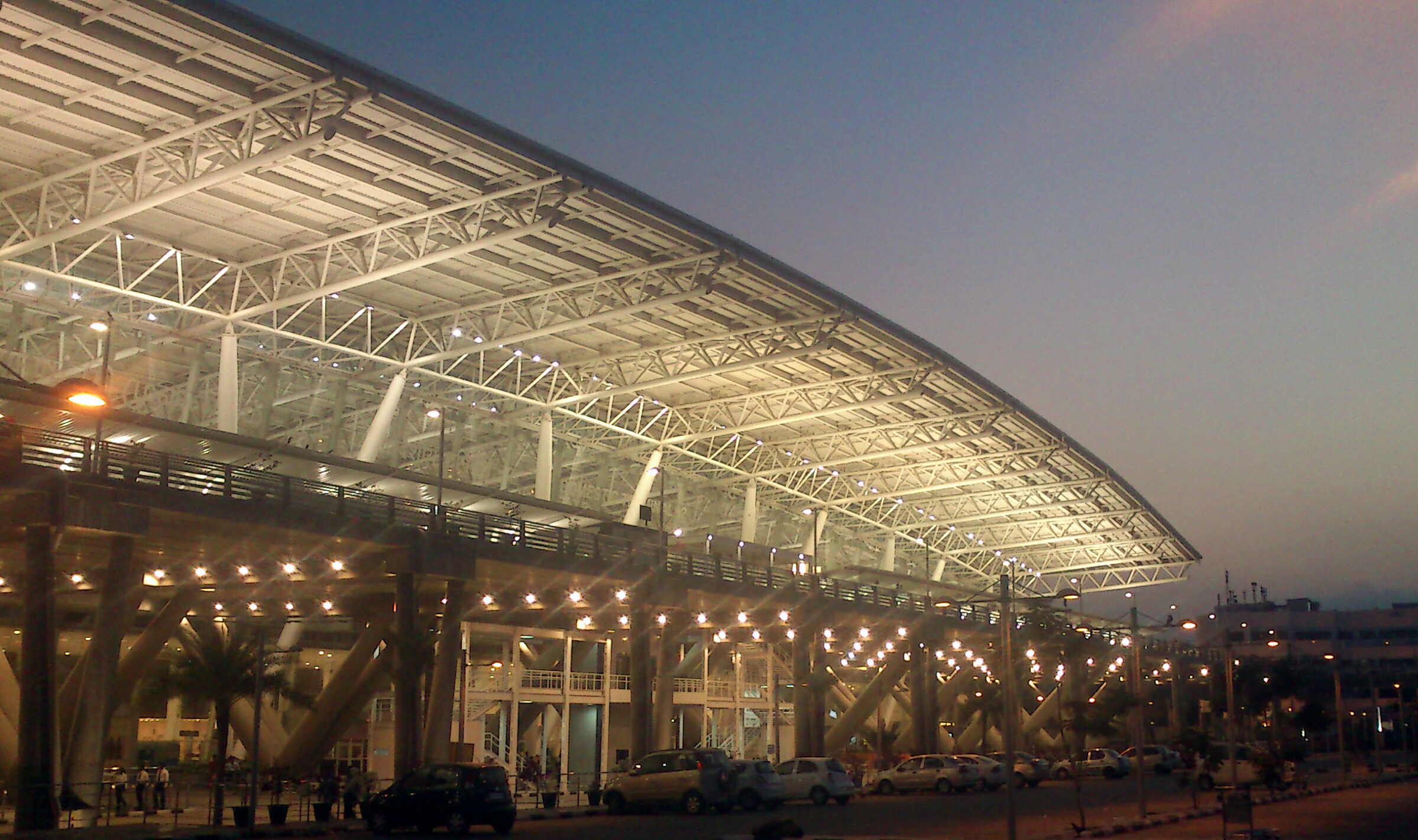
Chennai International Airport is one of the busiest airports in South Asia

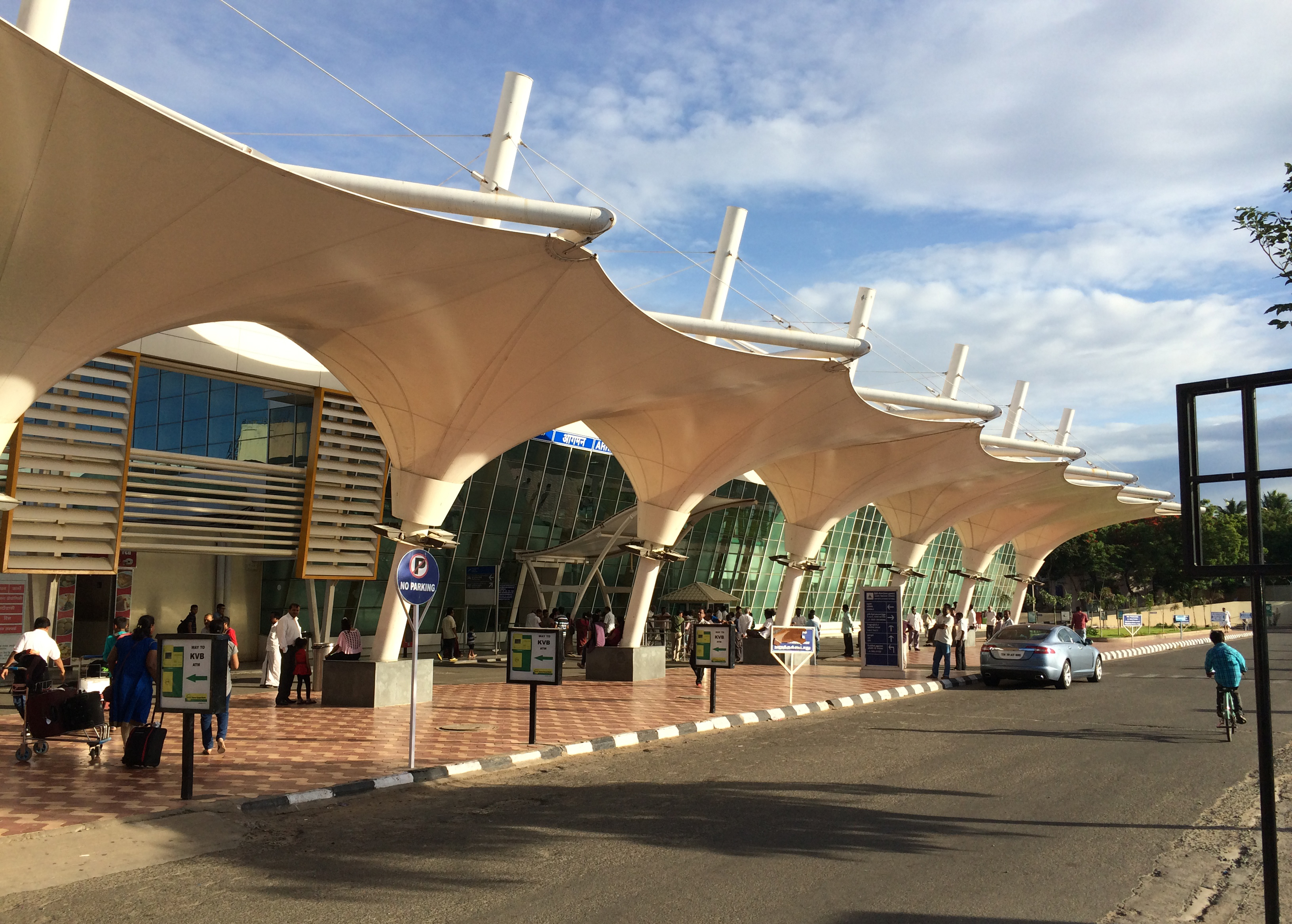
Coimbatore International Airport is the second busiest airport in Tamil Nadu

There are four international, and six domestic or private airports in Tamil Nadu. Chennai airport, which is the fourth busiest airport by passenger traffic in India is a major international airport and the main gateway to the state. Other international airports in the state include Coimbatore, Madurai, and Tiruchirapalli. Domestic flights are operational to certain airports like Salem and Thoothukudi while flights are planned to be introduced to more domestic airports by the UDAN scheme of Government of India.

Area Served	Airport Name	IATA	ICAO	Airport Type
Chennai	Chennai International Airport	MAA	VOMM	International
Coimbatore	Coimbatore International Airport	CJB	VOCB	International
Hosur	Hosur Aerodrome		VO95	State/Private
Madurai	Madurai International Airport	IXM	VOMD	International
Neyveli	Neyveli Airport	NVY	VONY	State/Private
Salem	Salem Airport	SXV	VOSM	Domestic
Thanjavur	Thanjavur Airport	TJV	VOTJ	Domestic (CE)
Thoothukkudi	Thoothukudi Airport	TCR	VOTK	Domestic
Tiruchirappalli	Tiruchirappalli International Airport	TRZ	VOTR	International
Vellore	Vellore Airport		VOVR	Domestic

The region comes under the purview of the Southern Air Command of the Indian Air Force. The Air Force operates three air bases in the state Sulur, Tambaram and Thanjavur. The Indian Navy operates airbases at Arakkonam, Uchipuli and Chennai.

== Water ==
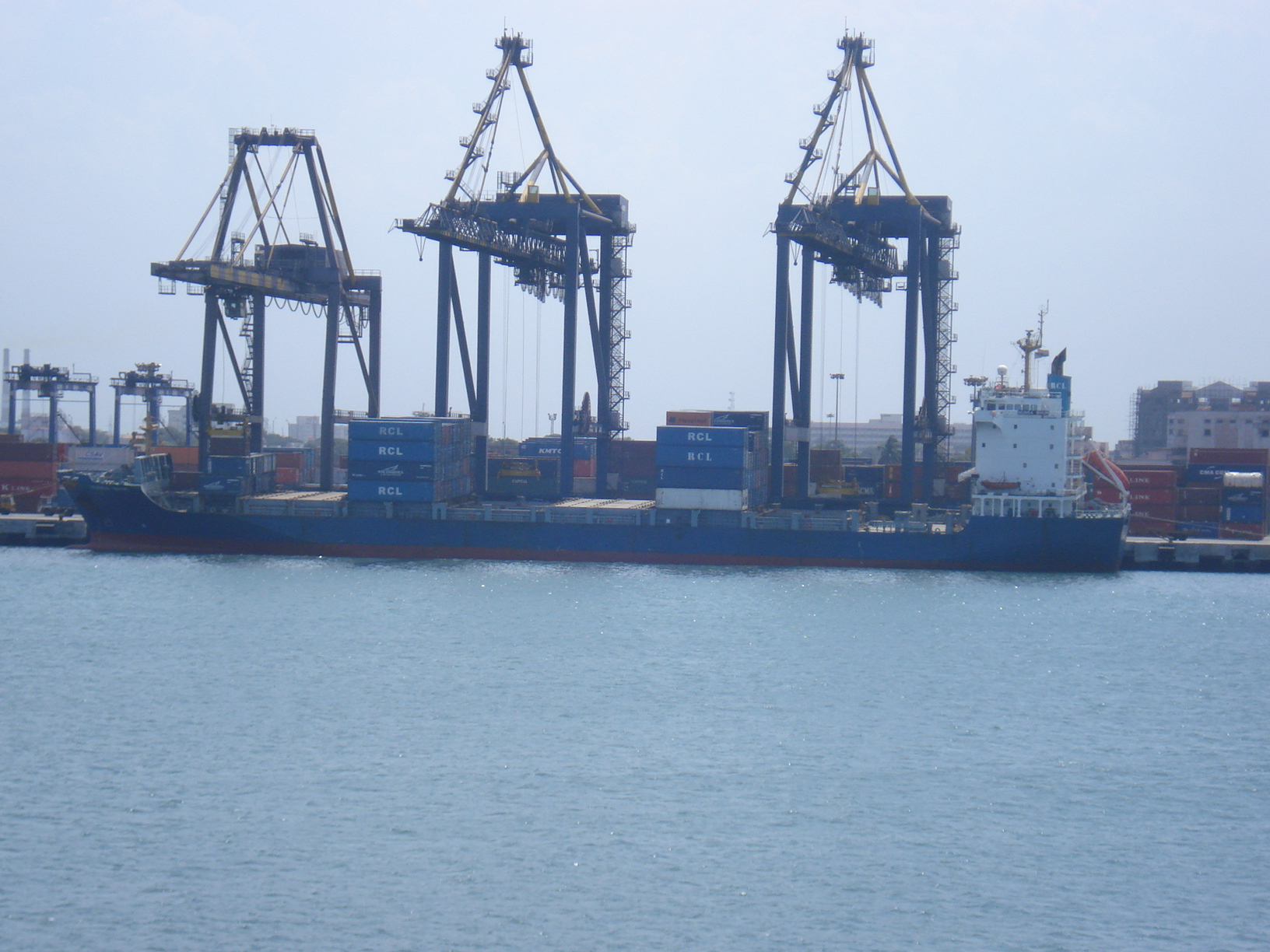
Chennai Port, one of the busiest ports in the east coast of India

Tamil Nadu has 1,076 kilometres (669 mi) long coastline and is the second longest coastline in the country after Gujarat. There are three major ports Chennai, Ennore and Thoothukudi which are managed by the Ministry of Ports, Shipping and Waterways of Government of India. There is an intermediate sea port at Nagapattinam and sixteen other minor ports which are managed by the department of highways and minor ports of Government of Tamil Nadu. Tamil Nadu forms part of both the Eastern Naval Command and Southern Naval Command the Indian Navy which has a major base at Chennai and logistics support base at Thoothukudi.

== See also ==
- Transport in India
