= Mambazha Salai =

Commercial neighbourhood of Tiruchirappalli in Tamil Nadu, India

Mambazha Salai (Tamil: மாம்பழ சாலை), meaning Mango Market in Tamil, is a commercial neighbourhood in Tiruchirappalli, Tamil Nadu, India. It houses one of the city's principal mango markets.
