= Trichinopoly cigar =

Type of cheroot grown in Tiruchirappalli, India

Trichinopoly cigar, also called Trichies or Tritchies, is a type of cheroot associated with the town of Tiruchirappalli in Tamil Nadu, India. The Trichinopoly cigar was actually manufactured from tobacco grown near the town of Dindigul near the present-day Tiruchirappalli and formed one of India's main items of export during the Victorian era.

Winston Churchill, noted for his fondness of cigars, was said to prefer the mildly aromatic Trichy cigar over the heavy pungent smell of Havanas.

== Trichinopoly cigars in literature and cinema ==
In “the Story of the House with the Green Blinds”, a sub-section of “The Rajah’s Diamond”, itself a sub-section of New Arabian Nights” by Robert Louis Stevenson, Mr. Vandeleur “was smoking a Trichinopoli cigar in the veranda.” [Pentlandite Edition, Cassell & Company 1906, p. 157]

In Chapter 3 of A Study In Scarlet by Arthur Conan Doyle, Sherlock Holmes provides a description of a culprit: "He was more than six feet high, was in the prime of life, had small feet for his height, wore coarse, square-toed boots and smoked a Trichinopoly cigar."

In Chapter 1 of The Sign of Four by Arthur Conan Doyle, Sherlock Holmes has written a monograph on identifying various types of cigar ash: "To the trained eye there is as much difference between the black ash of a Trichinopoly and the white fluff of bird's-eye as there is between a cabbage and a potato."

In Chapter 20 of "The Cat's Eye: A Dr. John Thorndyke Story", by R. Austin Freeman, Dr. Thorndyke remarks that at the end of a case, he will "usually smoke a Trichinopoly Cigar." In Chapter XIII of The Red Thumb Mark by the same author, the villain, knowing Dr Thorndyke's partiality for Trichinopoly cigars, tries to murder him by sending him a poisoned specimen.

In Chapter III of The Unpleasantness at the Bellona Club, by Dorothy L. Sayers, Lord Peter Wimsey has been drinking an expensive old port and comments disparagingly on "a fellow who polluted it with a Trichinopoly."

In the Father Brown story "The Salad of Colonel Cray" by G. K. Chesterton, Colonel Cray recounts a story about their service in India and "asked Putnam if he could get some Trichinopoli cigars".

In Alfred Hitchcock's 1938 film The Lady Vanishes, Gilbert, role-playing Sherlock Holmes, jokingly offers Iris Henderson a Trichinopoly cigar: "For that, my dear Watson, you too, have a Trichinopoly cigar." What he hands her from inside his jacket, however, is a fountain pen.

In Chapter X of Coming Up for Air, by George Orwell, The main character, George Bowling, describes the home of his wife's Anglo-Indian family of the poverty-stricken officer class: "As soon as you set foot inside the front door you're in India in the 'eighties. You know the kind of atmosphere. The carved teak furniture, the brass trays, the dusty tiger-skulls on the wall, the Trichinopoly cigars...They had a little dark house in one of those buried back-streets that exist in Ealing. It smelt perpetually of Trichinopoly cigars and it was so full of spears, blow-pipes, brass ornaments and the heads of wild animals that you could hardly move about in it."

In Almotasin short tale of J. L. Borges Ficciones, a couple of Trichinópoli cigars go missing.
