= Uyyakondan Thirumalai =

Uyyakondan Thirumalai Karkudimalai, Thirumalainallur
- Neighbourhood
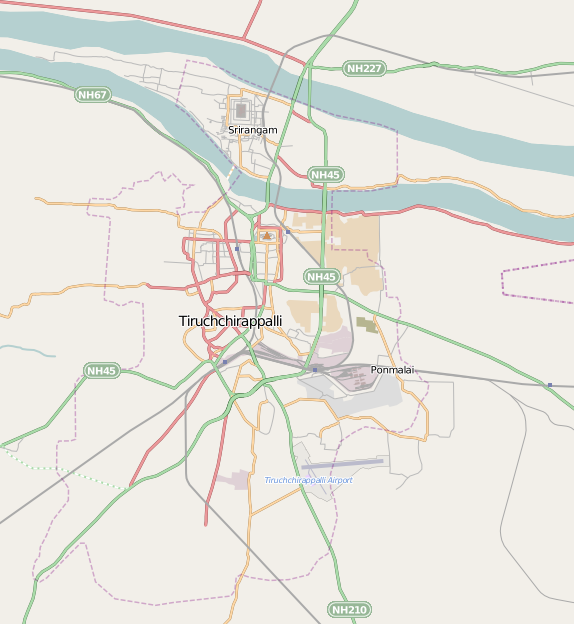
- Location in Tiruchirapalli
- Coordinates: 10°48′55″N 78°39′43″E
- Country: India
- State: Tamil Nadu
- Time zone: UTC+5.30 (IST)
- Postal code: 620102

Uyyakondan Thirumalai (also known as Karkudimalai and Thirumalainallur) is a suburb in the city of Tiruchirappalli, Tamil Nadu, India. Uyyakondan Thirumalai gets its name from the hill lock located in the locality. Located on the hillock is a temple dedicated to the Hindu god Shiva.

== See also ==
- Tiruchirappalli Fort
