= Tiruchirappalli =

City in Tamil Nadu, India

Tiruchirappalli Trichy
- Metropolis
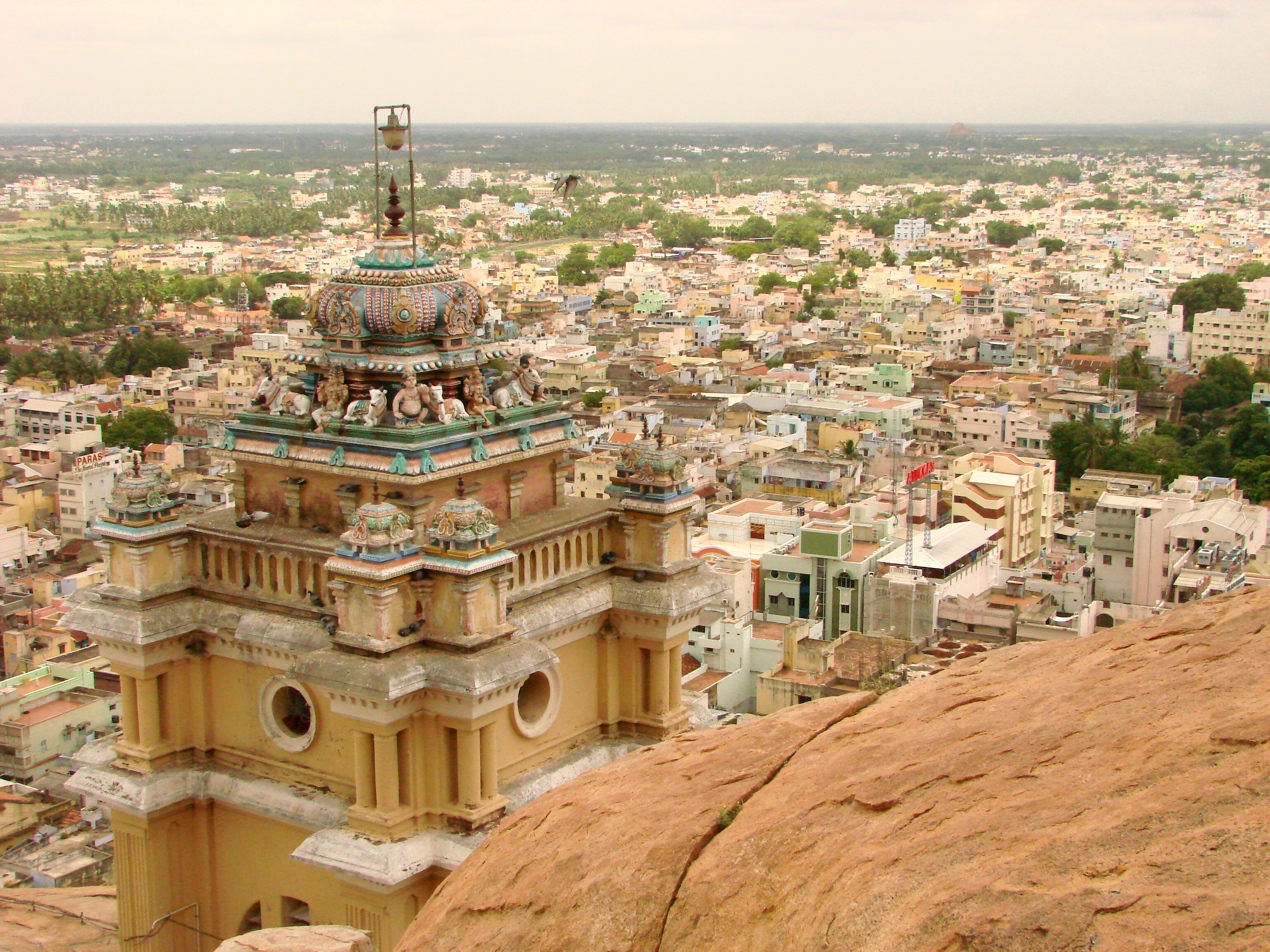
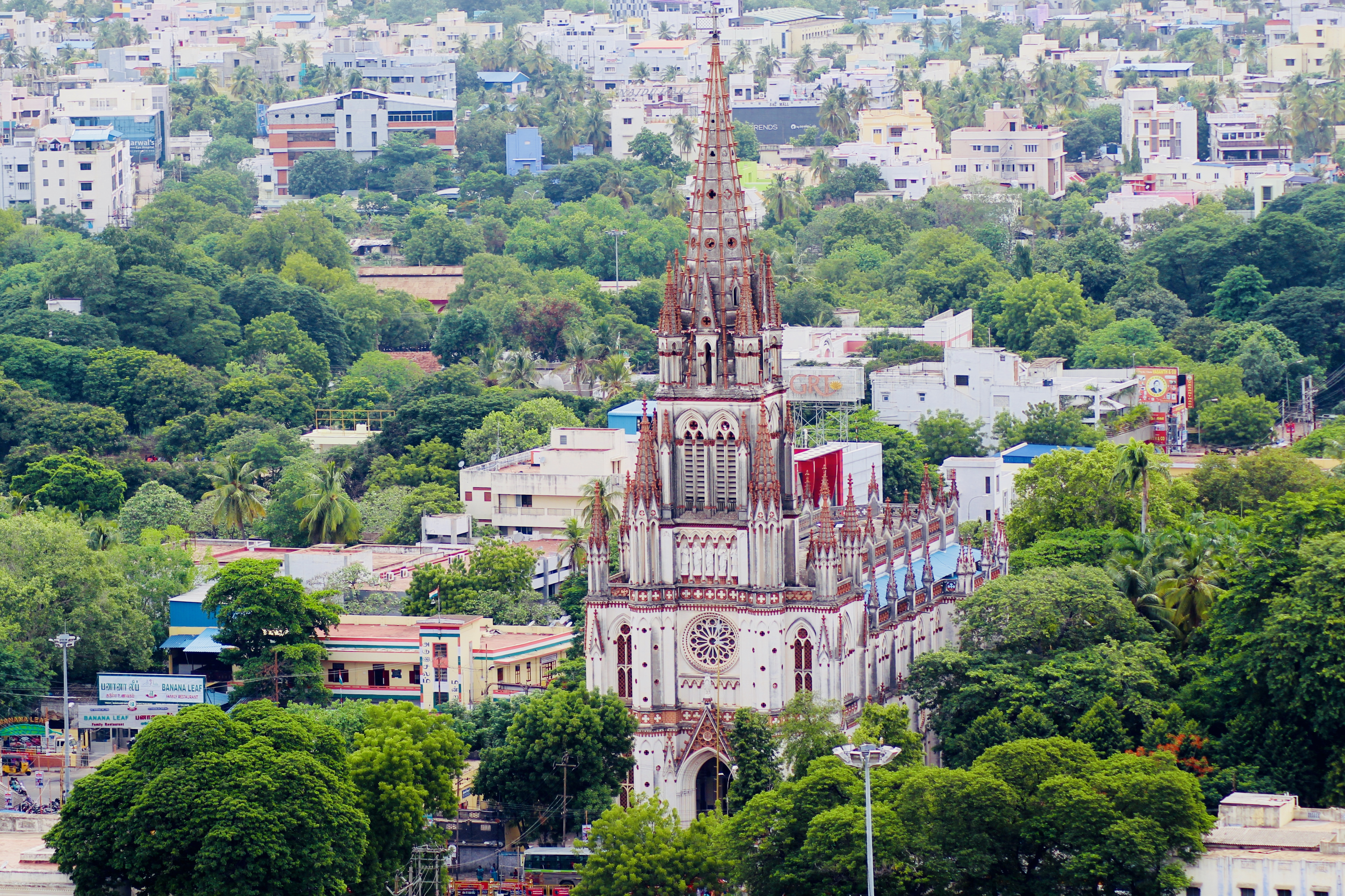
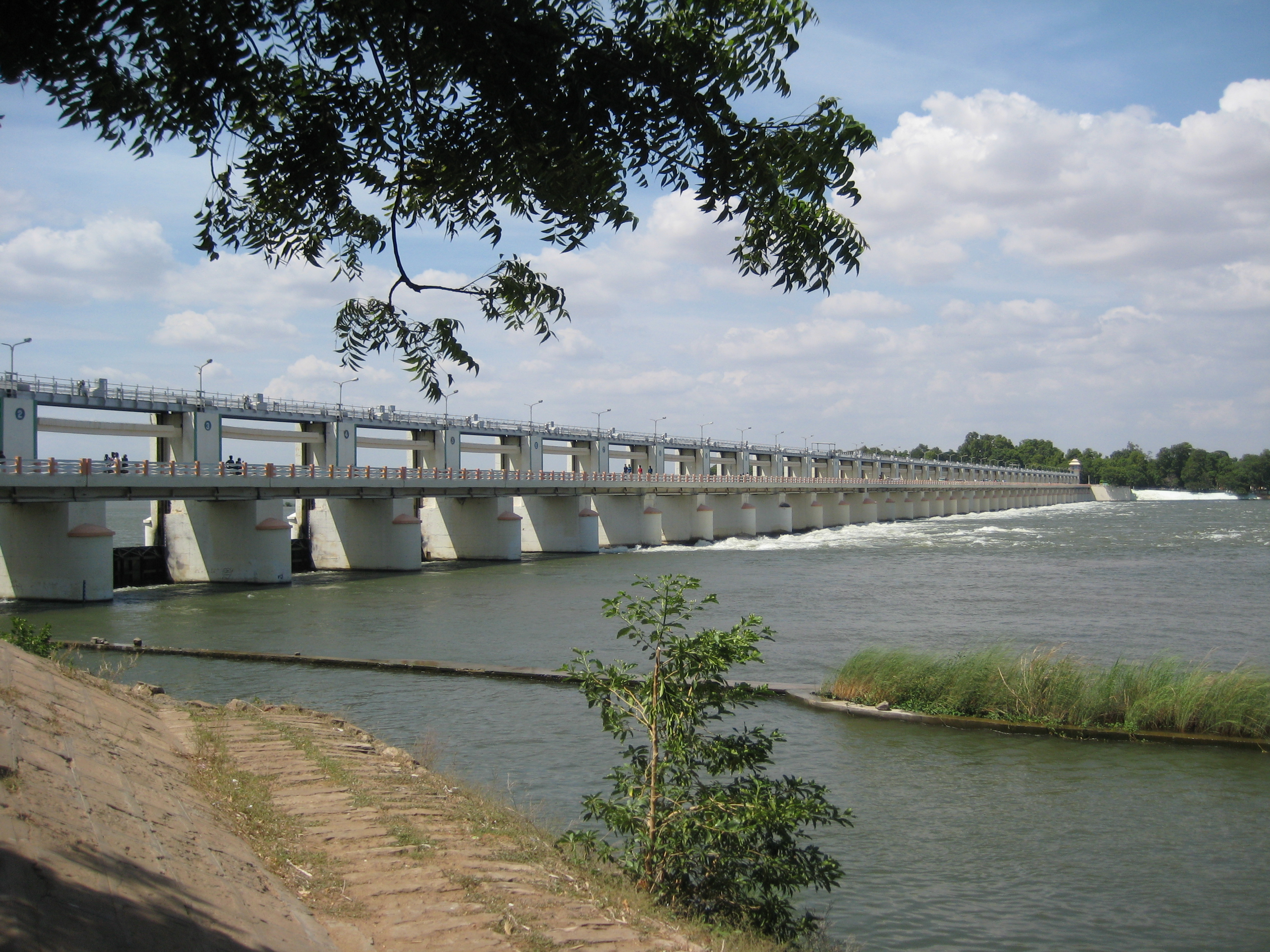
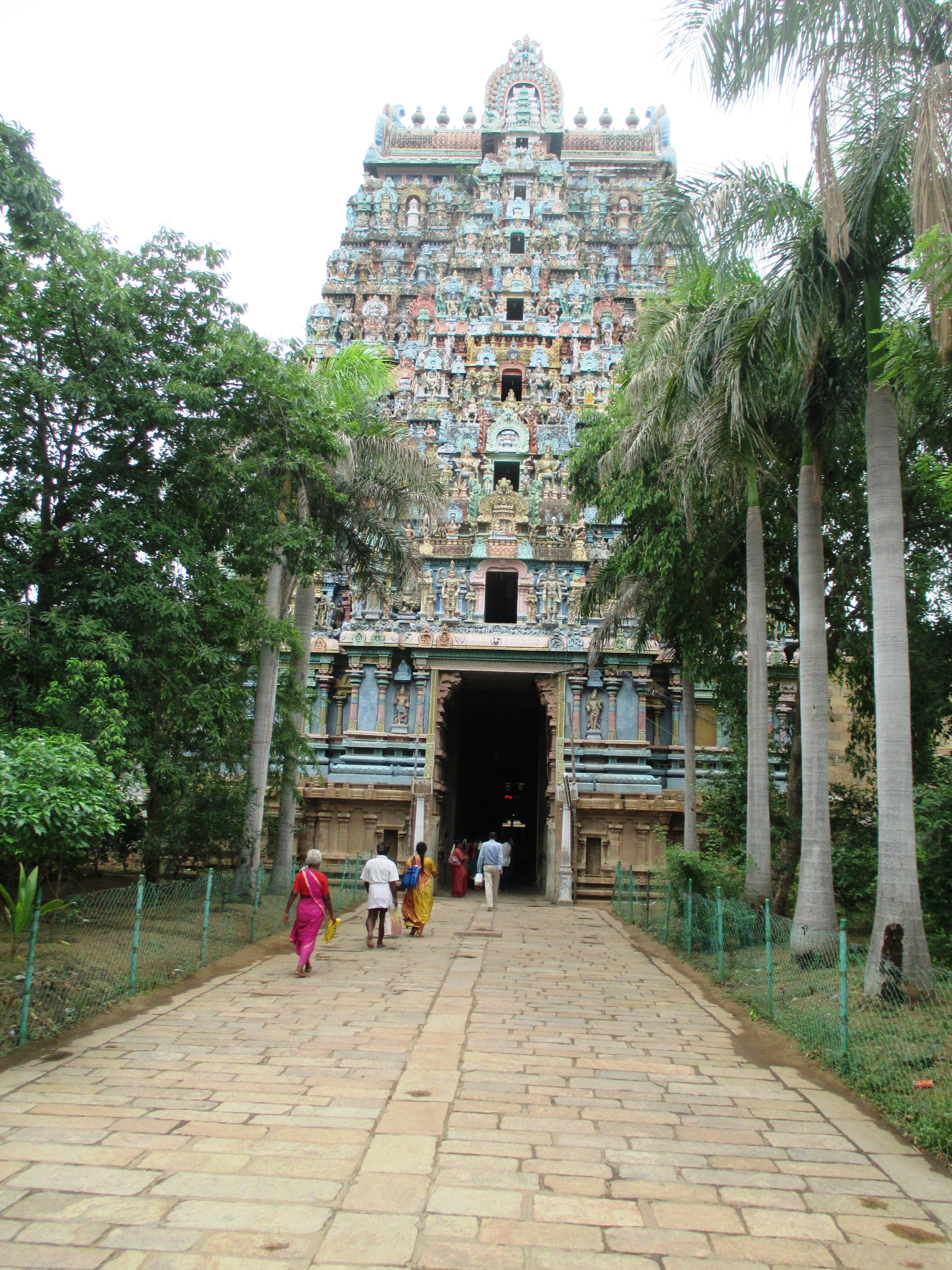
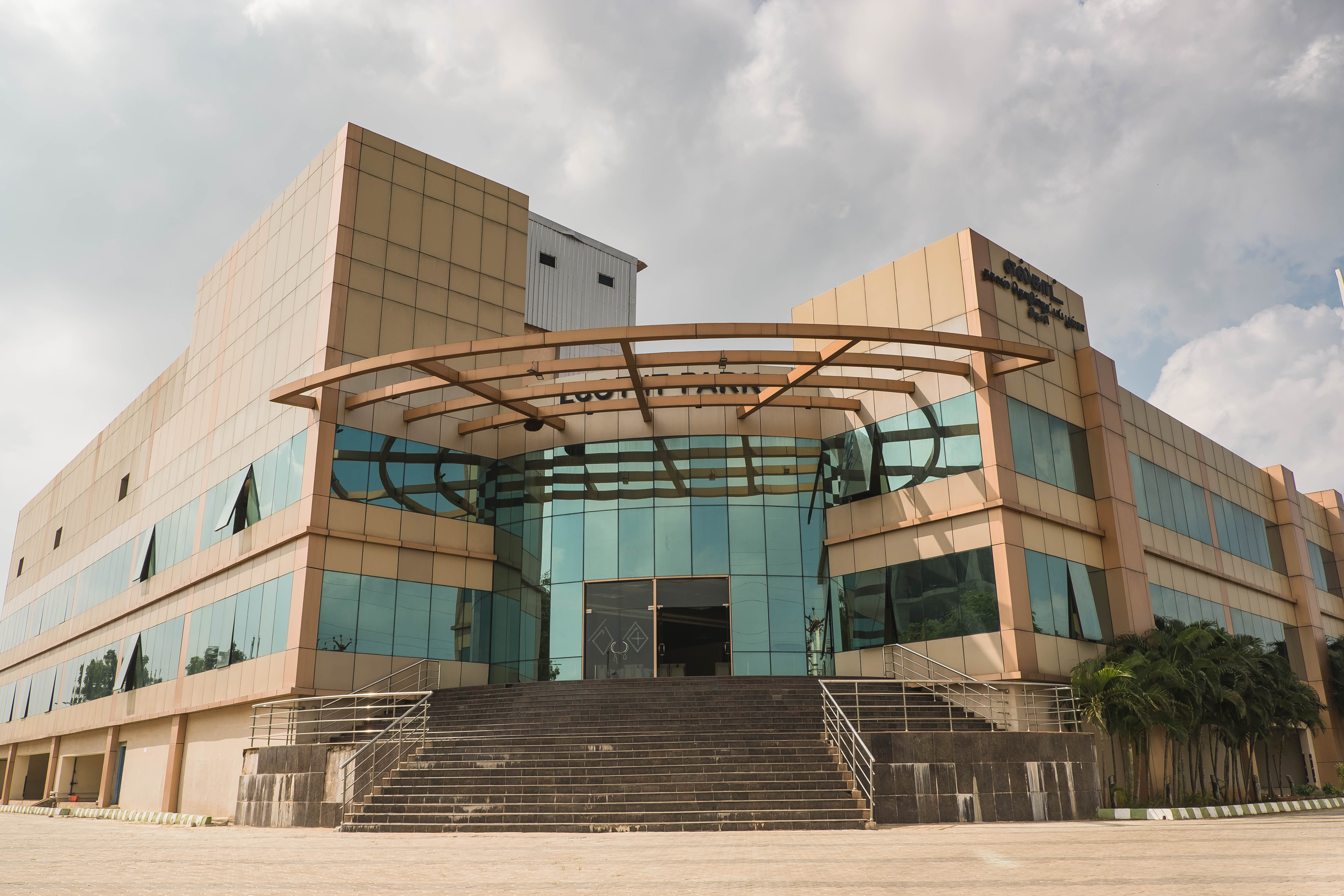
- Clockwise from top: Ranganathaswamy Temple, Srirangam, Our Lady of Lourdes Church, Jambukeswarar Temple, Thiruvanaikaval, ELCOT IT Park Trichy, Tiruchirappalli Junction, Mukkombu, and Tiruchirapalli Rock Fort.
- Nickname: Rockfort City
- Tiruchirappalli in Tamil Nadu
- Coordinates: 10°48′23.184″N 78°41′21.021″E
- Country: India
- State: Tamil Nadu
- District: Tiruchirapalli
- Established: 1866

Government
  - Type: Municipal Corporation
  - Body: Tiruchirappalli City Municipal Corporation
  - Mayor: Mu. Anbalaagan
  - Deputy Mayor: G. Dhivya
  - Commissioner of Police: N. Kamini I.P.S.
  - Member of Parliament: Durai Vaiko

Area
  - Metropolis: 167.23 km^{2} (64.57 sq mi)
  - Metro: 211.51 km^{2} (81.66 sq mi)
  - Rank: 4
- Elevation: 81 m (266 ft)

Population (2011) (Note: The area of the city was expanded from 146.9 square kilometres (56.7 sq mi) to 167.23 square kilometres (64.57 sq mi) in 2010, as a result of which the population increased from 847,387 to 916,857 according to the 2011 census.)
  - Metropolis: 916,857
  - Rank: 52nd in India; 4th in Tamil Nadu
  - Density: 5,482.6/km^{2} (14,200/sq mi)
  - Metro: 1,022,518
  - Metro density: 4,834.4/km^{2} (12,521/sq mi)
  - Metro rank: 52nd
- Demonym: Tiruchiite
- Time zone: UTC+5:30 (IST)
- PIN: 620 xxx
- Telephone code: 0431
- Vehicle registration: TN-45, TN-48, TN-81, TN-81A
- Official language: Tamil, English
- Climate: As
- GDP(2020): US$9.94 (equivalent to $12.37 in 2025)Billion
- Website: Trichy City Municipal Corporation

Thiruchchirappalli (Note: The official spelling, as per the municipal corporation website is "Tiruchirappalli". However, the spellings Tiruchirapalli, Tiruchchirapalli and Tiruchchirappalli are also widely used.) (Tamil pronunciation: [ˈt̪iɾɯtːʃiɾapːaɭːi]), also known as Tiruchchi or Trichy or historically known as Trichinopoly, is a major tier II city in the Indian state of Tamil Nadu and the administrative headquarters of Tiruchirappalli district. The city is credited with being the most livable and cleanest city in all of Tamil Nadu, as well as the fifth safest city for women in India. It is the fourth largest urban agglomeration in the state. Located 322 kilometres (200 mi) south of Chennai and 374 kilometres (232 mi) north of Kanyakumari, Tiruchirappalli sits almost at the geographic centre of Tamil Nadu. The Cauvery Delta begins 16 kilometres (9.9 mi) west of the city where the Kaveri river splits into two, forming the island of Srirangam which is now incorporated into the Tiruchirappalli City Municipal Corporation. The city occupies an area of 168.23 square kilometres (64.95 sq mi) and had a population of 916,857 in 2011.

Tiruchirappalli's recorded history begins under Chola rule in the 3rd century BC. The city has also been ruled by the Mutharayars, Pallavas, Pandyas, Vijayanagar Empire, Nayak Dynasty, the Carnatic state and the British. The most prominent historical monuments in Tiruchirappalli include the Rockfort at Teppakulam, the Ranganathaswamy temple at Srirangam dedicated to the reclining form of the God Vishnu, serving as the largest functioning temple in the world, and the Jambukeswarar Temple at Thiruvanaikaval, which is also the largest temple for the God Shiva in the world. The archaeologically important town of Uraiyur, capital of the Early Cholas, is now a neighbourhood in Tiruchirappalli. The city played a critical role in the Carnatic Wars (1746–1763) between the British and French East India companies.

The city is an important educational centre in the state of Tamil Nadu, and houses nationally recognized institutions such as National Institute of Technology - Tiruchirapalli (NIT-T), Indian Institute of Management (IIM), Indian Institute of Information Technology (IIIT), Tamil Nadu National Law University (NLU), Government Medical College, Anna university University bit campus, Industrial units such as Bharat Heavy Electricals Limited (BHEL), Golden Rock Railway Workshop, Ordnance Factory Tiruchirappalli (OFT) and High Energy Projectile Factory (HEPF) have their factories in the city. The presence of a large number of energy equipment manufacturing units in and around the city has earned it the title of "Energy Equipment and Fabrication Capital of India". It is one of the few towns and cities in List of AMRUT Smart cities in Tamil Nadu selected for AMRUT Schemes from central government and the developmental activities are taken care by government of Tamil Nadu. Tiruchirappalli is internationally recognized for the brand of cheroot known as the Trichinopoly cigar, which was exported in large quantities to the United Kingdom during the 19th century.

A major road and railway hub in the state, the city is served by the Tiruchirappalli International Airport (TRZ) which operates direct flights to the Middle East (Dubai, Saudi Arabia) and Southeast Asia (Singapore, Malaysia).

== Etymology ==
Historically, Tiruchirappalli was commonly referred to in English as "Trichinopoly". The shortened forms "Trichy" or "Tiruchi" are used in everyday speech and the full name Tiruchirapalli appears in official use by government and quasi-government offices but seldom used by the general public.

A Hindu historical account describes Tiruchirapalli's name as being derived from "Thiru-Sriranga-Palli", as the place where the reclining lord Ranganatha reposed. . Another account from Hindu mythology describes Tiruchirappalli as deriving its name from the three-headed demon Trishira, who meditated on the Hindu god Shiva near the present-day city to obtain favours from the god. An alternative derivation, albeit not universally accepted, is that the source of the city's name is the Sanskrit word "Trishirapuram"—Trishira, meaning "three-headed", and palli or puram meaning "city".

According to the late scholar C. P. Brown, Tiruchirappalli might be a derivative of the word Chiruta-palli (lit. 'little town'). Orientalists Henry Yule and Arthur Coke Burnell have speculated that the name may derive from a rock inscription carved in the 16th century in which Tiruchirappalli is written as Tiru-ssila-palli, meaning "holy-rock-town" in Tamil. Other scholars have suggested that the name Tiruchirappalli is a rewording of Tiru-chinna-palli, meaning "holy little town". The Madras Glossary gives the root as Tiruććināppalli or the "holy (tiru) village (palli) of the shina (Cissampelos pareira) plant".

== History ==
=== Early and medieval history ===
Tiruchirappalli is one of the oldest inhabited cities in Tamil Nadu; its earliest settlements date back to the Sangam period. Uraiyur, the capital of the Early Cholas for 600 years from the 3rd century BC onwards, is a neighbourhood in the present-day Tiruchirappalli. The city is referred to as Orthoura by the historian Ptolemy in his 2nd-century work Geography. The world's oldest surviving dam, the Kallanai (Lower Anaicut) about 18 kilometres (11 mi) from Uraiyur, was built across the Kaveri River by Karikala Chola in the 2nd century AD.

The medieval history of Tiruchirappalli begins with the reign of the Pallava king Mahendravarman I, who ruled over South India in the 6th century AD and constructed the rock-cut cave-temples within the Rockfort. Following the downfall of the Pallavas in the 8th century, the city was conquered by the Medieval Cholas, who ruled until the 13th century.

After the decline of the Cholas, Tiruchirappalli was conquered by the Pandyas, who ruled from 1216 until their defeat in 1311 by Malik Kafur, the commander of Allauddin Khilji. The victorious armies of the Delhi Sultanate are believed to have plundered and ravaged the region. The statue of the Hindu god Ranganatha in the temple of Srirangam vanished at about this time and was not recovered and reinstated for more than fifty years. Tiruchirappalli was ruled by the Delhi and Madurai sultanates from 1311 to 1378, but by the middle of the 14th century the Madurai Sultanate had begun to fall apart. Gradually, the Vijayanagar Empire established supremacy over the northern parts of the kingdom, and Tiruchirappalli was taken by the Vijayanagar prince Kumara Kampanna Udaiyar in 1371. The Vijayanagar Empire ruled the region from 1378 until the 1530s, and played a prominent role in reviving Hinduism by reconstructing temples and monuments destroyed by the previous Muslim rulers. Following the collapse of the Vijayanagar Empire in the early part of the 16th century, the Madurai Nayak kingdom began to assert its independence. The city flourished during the reign of Vishwanatha Nayak (c. 1529–1564), who is said to have protected the area by constructing the Teppakulam and building walls around the Srirangam temple. His successor Kumara Krishnappa Nayaka made Tiruchirappalli his capital, and it served as the capital of the Madurai Nayak kingdom from 1616 to 1634 and from 1665 to 1736.

In 1736, the last Madurai Nayak ruler, Meenakshi, committed suicide, and Tiruchirappalli was conquered by Chanda Sahib. He ruled the kingdom from 1736 to 1741, when he was captured and imprisoned by the Marathas in the siege of Trichinopoly (1741) led by General Raghuji Bhonsle under the orders of Chhattrapati Shahu. Chanda Sahib remained a prisoner for about eight years before making his escape from the Maratha Empire. Tiruchirappalli was administered by the Maratha general Murari Rao from 1741 to 1743, when it was regained by the Nizam of Hyderabad after the six-month-long siege of Trichinopoly (1743). The Nizam appointed Khwaja Abdullah as the governor and returned to Golkonda. When the Nawab of the Carnatic, Muhammed Ali Khan Wallajah, was dethroned by Chanda Sahib after the Battle of Ambur (1749), the former fled to Tiruchirappalli, where he set up his base. The subsequent siege of Trichinopoly (1751-1752) by Chanda Sahib took place during the Second Carnatic War between the British East India Company and Muhammed Ali Khan Wallajah on one side and Chanda Sahib and the French East India Company on the other. The British were victorious, and Wallajah was restored to the throne. During his reign, he proposed renaming the city Natharnagar after the Sufi saint Nathar Vali, who is thought to have lived there in the 12th century AD. Tiruchirappalli was invaded by Nanjaraja Wodeyar in 1753 and Hyder Ali of the Mysore kingdom in 1780, both attacks being repulsed by the troops of the British East India Company. A third invasion attempt, by Tipu Sultan—son of Hyder Ali—in 1793, was also unsuccessful; he was pursued by British forces led by William Medows, who thwarted the attack.

=== British rule ===
The Carnatic kingdom was annexed by the British in July 1801 as a consequence of the discovery of collusion between Tipu Sultan—an enemy of the British—and Umdat Ul-Umra, son of Wallajah and the Nawab at the time, during the Fourth Anglo-Mysore War. Trichinopoly was incorporated into the Madras Presidency the same year, and the district of Trichinopoly was formed, with the city of Trichinopoly (or Tiruchirappalli) as its capital.

During the Company Raj and later the British Raj, Tiruchirappalli emerged as one of the most important cities in India. According to the 1871 Indian census—the first in British India—Tiruchirappalli had a population of 76,530, making it the second largest city in the presidency after the capital of Madras (now Chennai). It was known throughout the British Empire for its unique variety of cheroot, known as the Trichinopoly cigar. Tiruchirappalli was the first headquarters for the newly formed South Indian Railway Company in 1874 until its relocation to Madras in the early 20th century. (Note: Madras was renamed as Chennai in 1996.)

Trichinopoly under British rule

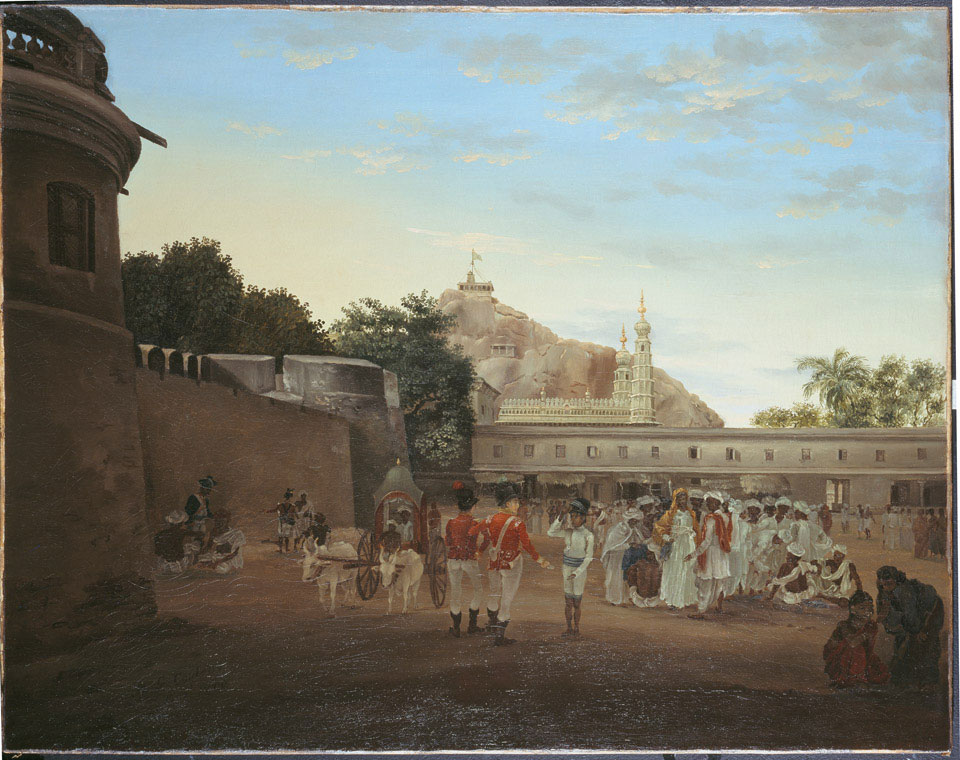
The Market Place of Trichinopoly showing officers of the Madras Light Infantry (Philip Le Couteur, 1800)

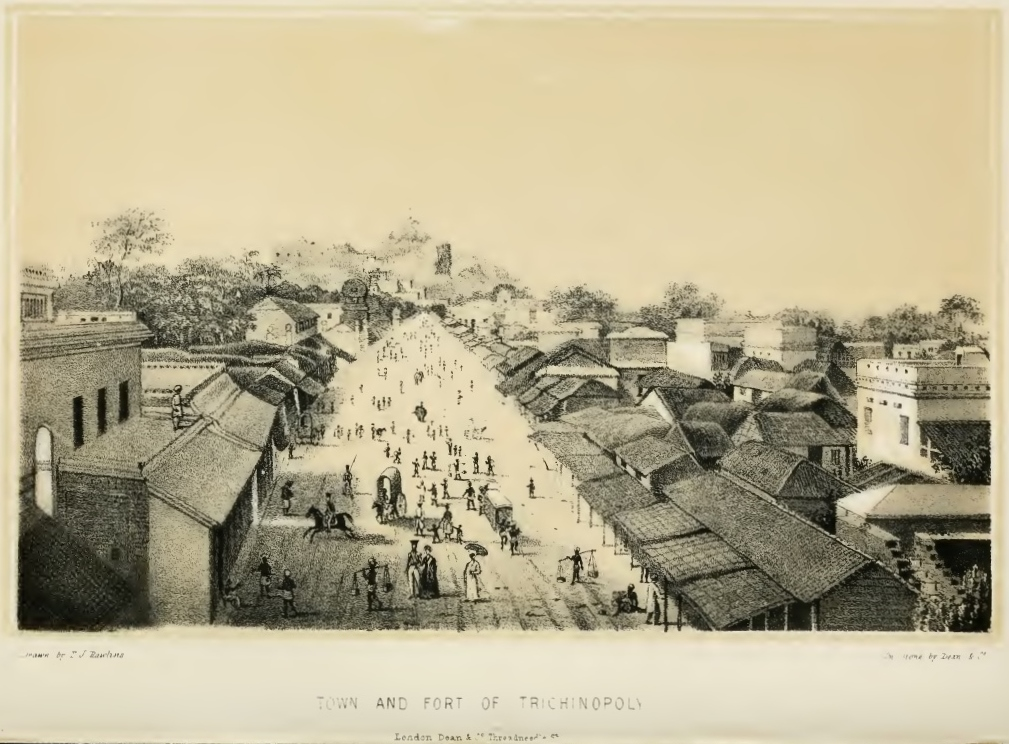
c. 1840 illustration of the town and fort of Trichinopoly

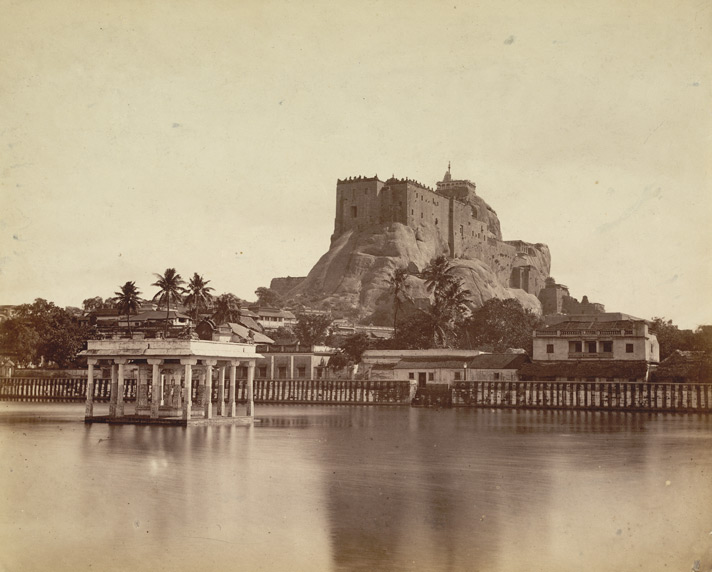
c. 1860 photograph of Rockfort and Teppakulam

=== Contemporary and modern history ===
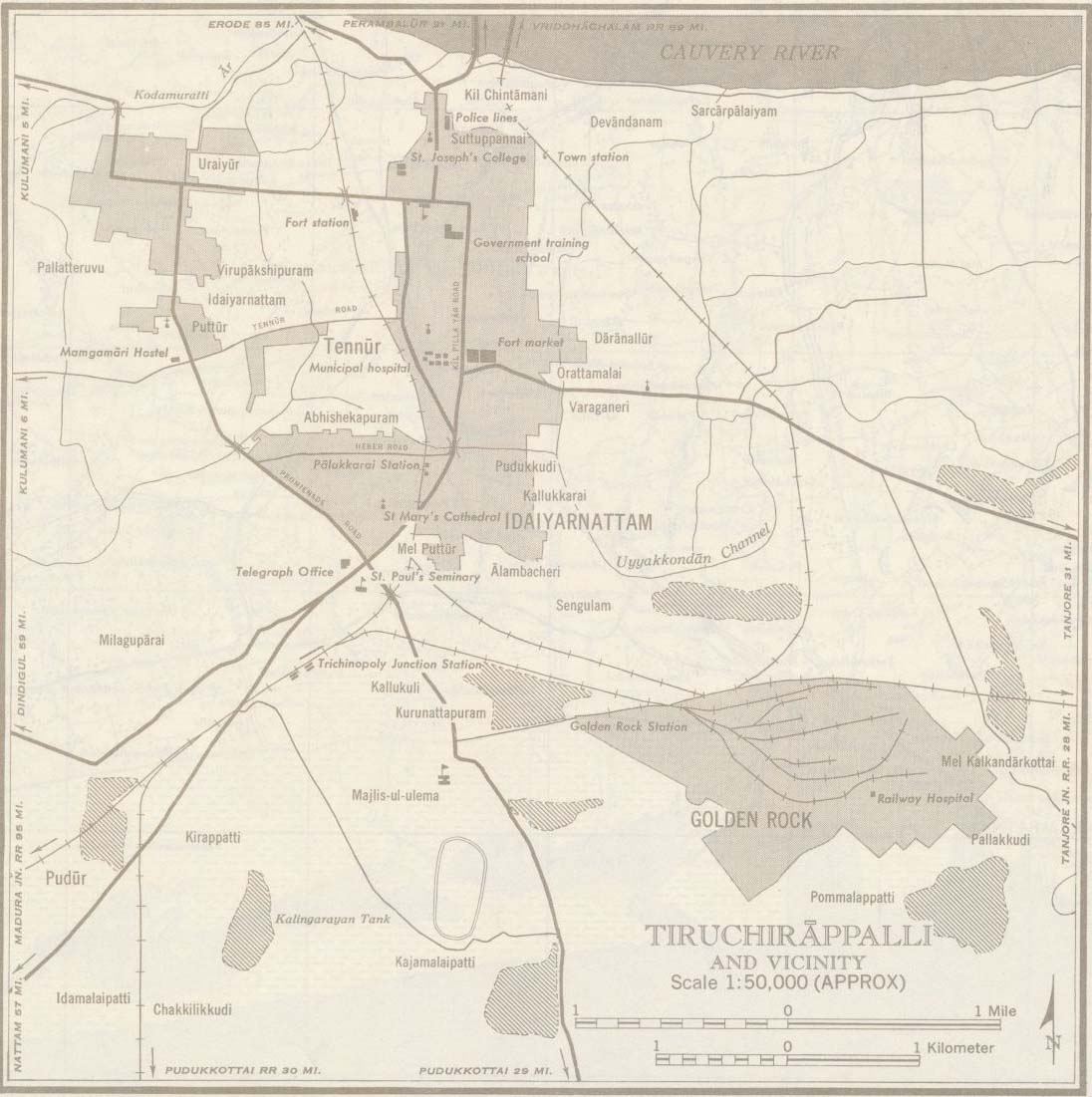
Map of Tiruchirappalli town in 1955

Tiruchirappalli played an active role during the pre-independence era; there were a number of strikes and non-violent protests during the Quit India Movement, notably the South Indian Railway Strike that took place in 1928. The city was the base for the Vedaranyam salt march initiated by C. Rajagopalachari in parallel with the Dandi March in 1930. Tiruchirappalli was an epicentre of the anti-Hindi agitations of Tamil Nadu when a team of Tamil language supporters gathered and organised a rally from the city to Madras in 1938. Later in 1965, Tiruchirappalli was made the base of the "Madras state Anti-Hindi Conference" convened by C. Rajagopalachari. The population of Tiruchirappalli continued to grow rapidly, achieving a growth rate of 36.9% during the period 1941–51. After independence in 1947, Tiruchirappalli fell behind other cities such as Salem and Coimbatore in terms of growth. Tiruchirappalli remained a part of Madras State, which was renamed Tamil Nadu in 1969. The city underwent extensive economic development in the 1960s with the commissioning of Bharat Heavy Electricals Limited. In the early 1980s, M. G. Ramachandran, then Chief Minister of Tamil Nadu drafted a plan to move the state's administrative headquarters to Tiruchirappalli. A satellite town was developed near Navalpattu on the outskirts of the city, but the proposed move was shelved by successive governments.

There have been occasional outbreaks of violence against Sri Lankans. Owing to a series of terrorist attacks in Indian cities since 2000, security has been increased at sites such as Sri Ranganathaswamy Temple.

== Geography and climate ==
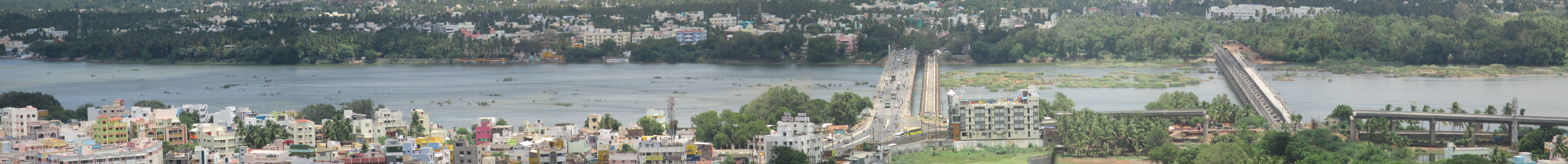
Panorama of Tiruchirappalli showing Cauvery river and the Srirangam island.

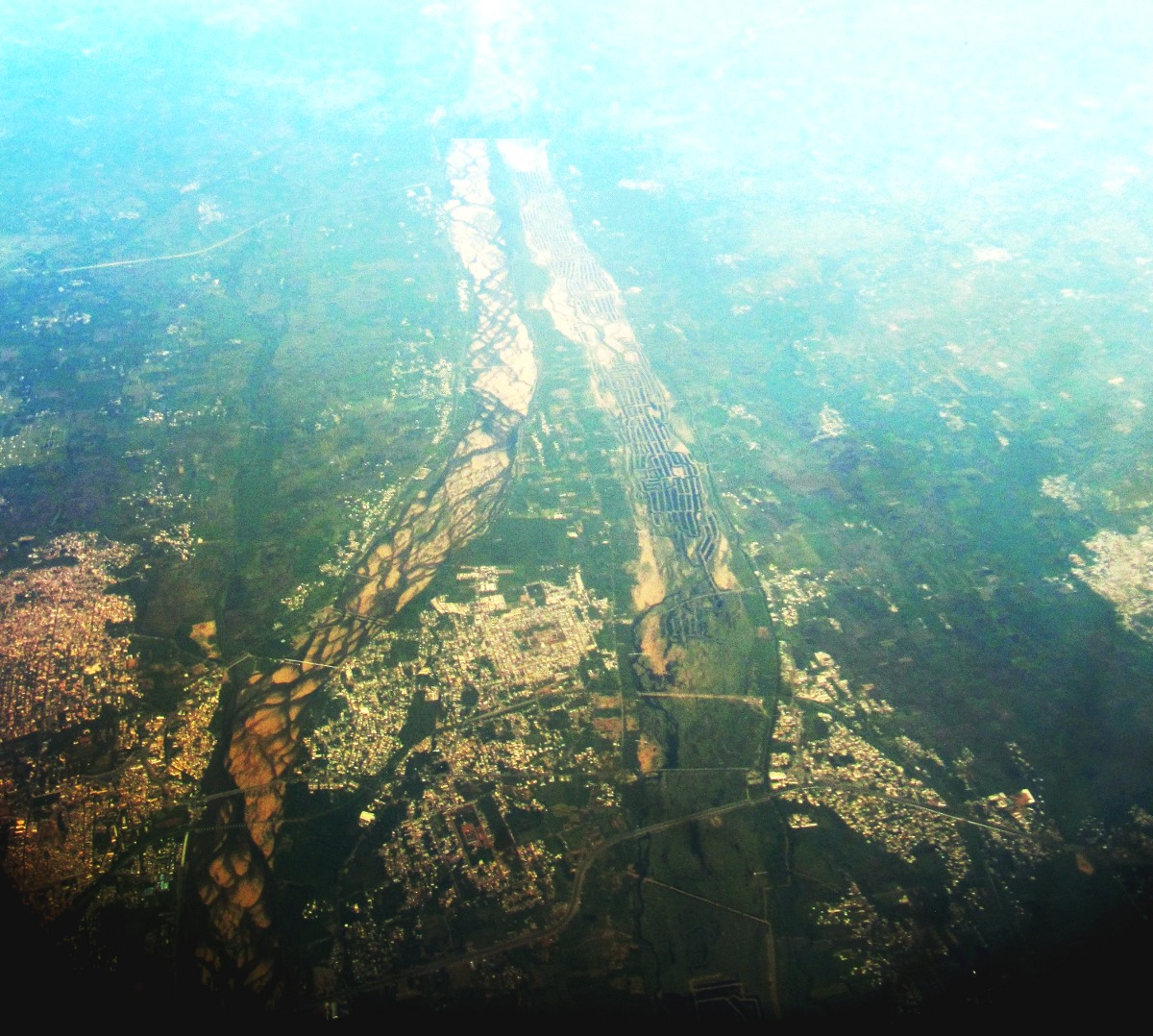
Aerial photograph of Srirangam island, sandwiched between the rivers Kaveri and Kollidam

Tiruchirappalli is situated in central south-eastern India, almost at the geographic centre of the state of Tamil Nadu. The Cauvery Delta begins to form 16 kilometres (9.9 mi) west of the city where the river divides into two streams—the Kaveri and the Kollidam—to form the island of Srirangam. By road it is 912 kilometres (567 mi) south of Hyderabad, 322 kilometres (200 mi) south-west of Chennai and 331 kilometres (206 mi) south-east of Bangalore. The topology of Tiruchirappalli is almost flat with an average elevation of 81 metres (266 ft). A few isolated hillocks rise above the surface, the highest of which is the Rockfort; its estimated age of 3,800 million years makes it one of the oldest rocks in the world. Other prominent hillocks include the Golden Rock, Khajamalai, and one each at Uyyakondan Thirumalai and Thiruverumbur.

Apart from Kaveri and its tributary Kollidam, the city is also drained by the Uyyakondan Channel, Koraiyar and Kudamurutti river channels. The land immediately surrounding the Kaveri River—which crosses Tiruchirappalli from west to east—consists of deposits of fertile alluvial soil on which crops such as finger millet and maize are cultivated. Further south, the surface is covered by poor-quality black soil. A belt of Cretaceous rock known as the Trichinopoly Group runs to the north-east of the city, and to the south-east there are layers of archaean rocks, granite and gneiss covered by a thin bed of conglomeratic laterite. The region falls under Seismic Zone III, which is moderately vulnerable to earthquakes.

=== Urban structure ===
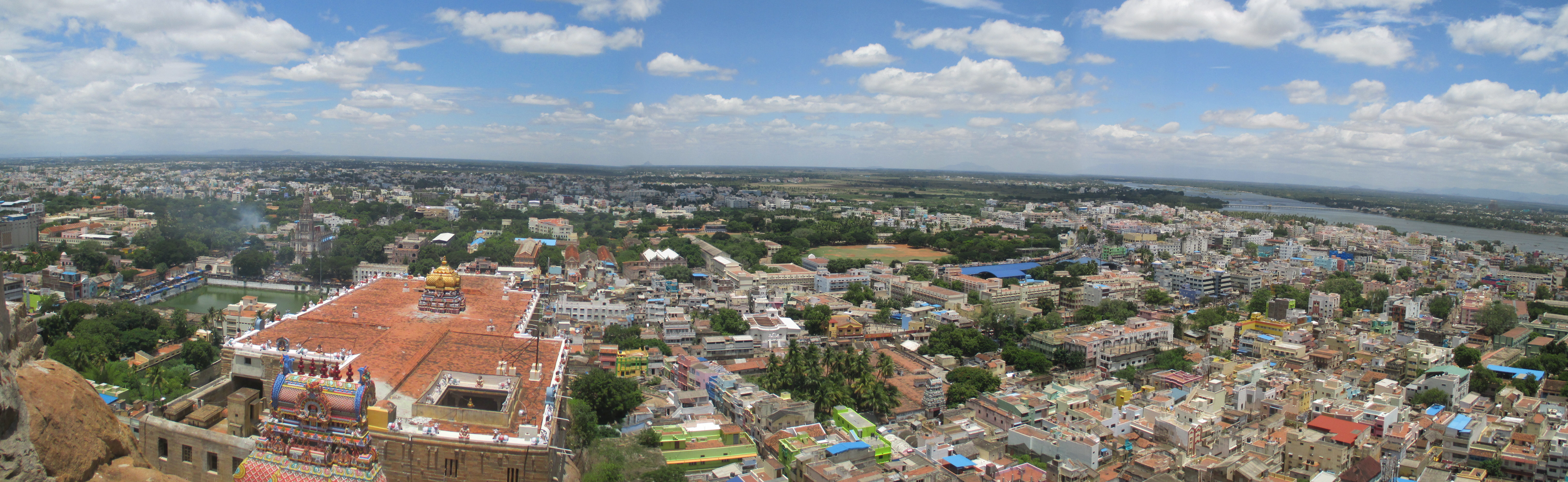
Panorama of Tiruchirappalli as seen from the top of the Rockfort.

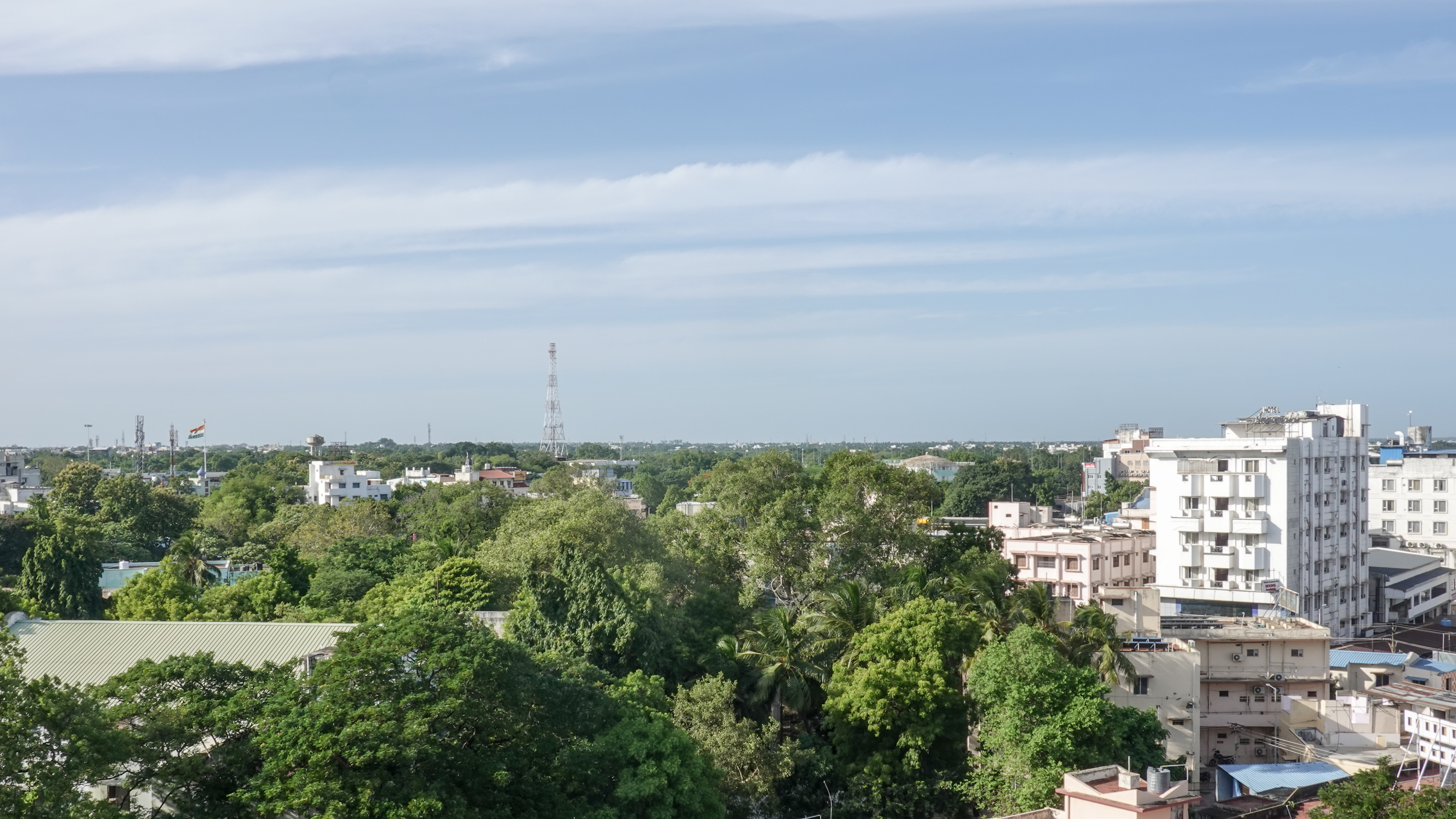
Skyline of the cantonment area, south of the Central Bus Station (ca. August 2022)

The city of Tiruchirappalli lies on the plains between the Shevaroy Hills to the north and the Palani Hills to the south and south-west. Tiruchirappalli is completely surrounded by agricultural fields. Densely populated industrial and residential areas have recently been built in the northern part of the city, and the southern edge also has residential areas. The older part of Tiruchirappalli, within the Rockfort, is unplanned and congested while the adjoining newer sections are better executed. Many of the old houses in Srirangam were constructed according to the shilpa sastras, the canonical texts of Hindu temple architecture.

=== Climate ===
Tiruchirappalli experiences a dry-summer tropical savanna climate (Köppen climate classification: As), with no major change in temperature between summer and winter. The climate is generally characterised by high temperature and low humidity. With an annual mean temperature of 28.9 °C (84.0 °F) and monthly average temperatures ranging between 25 °C (77 °F) and 32 °C (90 °F), the city is the hottest in the state. The warmest months are from April to June, when the city experiences frequent dust storms. As of 2013, the highest temperature ever recorded in Tiruchirappalli was 43.9 °C (111.0 °F), which occurred on 2 May 1896; the lowest was observed on 6 February 1884 at 13.9 °C (57.0 °F). The high temperatures in the city have been attributed to the presence of two rivers—Kaveri and Kollidam— (Note: As the river beds contain a large amount of silica in the form of sand, heat gets reflected.)and the absence of greenery around the city. As Tiruchirappalli is on the Deccan Plateau the days are extremely warm and dry; evenings are cooler because of cold winds that blow from the south-east. From June to September, the city experiences a moderate climate tempered by heavy rain and thundershowers. Rainfall is heaviest between October and December because of the north-east monsoon winds, and from December to February the climate is cool and moist. The average annual rainfall is 841.9 mm (33.15 in), slightly lower than the state's average of 945 mm (37.2 in). Fog and dew are rare and occur only during the winter season.

Climate data for Tiruchirappalli Airport (1991–2020, extremes 1949–present)
Month	Jan	Feb	Mar	Apr	May	Jun	Jul	Aug	Sep	Oct	Nov	Dec	Year
Record high °C (°F)	35.6 (96.1)	40.0 (104.0)	42.2 (108.0)	42.8 (109.0)	43.3 (109.9)	43.9 (111.0)	41.1 (106.0)	40.6 (105.1)	40.6 (105.1)	38.9 (102.0)	36.7 (98.1)	35.6 (96.1)	43.9 (111.0)
Mean daily maximum °C (°F)	30.7 (87.3)	33.1 (91.6)	36.0 (96.8)	37.8 (100.0)	38.2 (100.8)	37.1 (98.8)	36.5 (97.7)	36.0 (96.8)	35.4 (95.7)	33.1 (91.6)	30.6 (87.1)	29.7 (85.5)	34.5 (94.1)
Daily mean °C (°F)	25.6 (78.1)	27.2 (81.0)	29.7 (85.5)	31.8 (89.2)	32.0 (89.6)	31.5 (88.7)	31.1 (88.0)	30.5 (86.9)	29.9 (85.8)	28.3 (82.9)	26.6 (79.9)	25.4 (77.7)	29.1 (84.4)
Mean daily minimum °C (°F)	20.7 (69.3)	21.6 (70.9)	23.5 (74.3)	26.2 (79.2)	26.8 (80.2)	26.7 (80.1)	26.4 (79.5)	25.8 (78.4)	25.2 (77.4)	24.4 (75.9)	23.1 (73.6)	21.5 (70.7)	24.3 (75.7)
Record low °C (°F)	14.4 (57.9)	13.9 (57.0)	15.6 (60.1)	18.3 (64.9)	19.4 (66.9)	18.0 (64.4)	20.1 (68.2)	20.6 (69.1)	20.6 (69.1)	18.9 (66.0)	16.7 (62.1)	14.4 (57.9)	13.9 (57.0)
Average rainfall mm (inches)	6.4 (0.25)	4.0 (0.16)	3.6 (0.14)	34.1 (1.34)	78.9 (3.11)	44.9 (1.77)	57.4 (2.26)	87.7 (3.45)	118.2 (4.65)	154.9 (6.10)	191.1 (7.52)	79.0 (3.11)	860.3 (33.87)
Average rainy days	0.6	0.5	0.6	1.9	4.2	2.8	2.1	4.6	6.2	9.3	8.9	5.0	46.7
Average relative humidity (%) (at 17:30 IST)	53	42	37	42	44	45	45	48	52	64	71	66	51
Source 1: India Meteorological Department
Source 2: Tokyo Climate Center (mean temperatures 1991–2020)

Trichy has been ranked 11th best “National Clean Air City” (under Category 1 >10L Population cities) in India according to 'Swachh Vayu Survekshan 2024 Results'

== Demographics ==
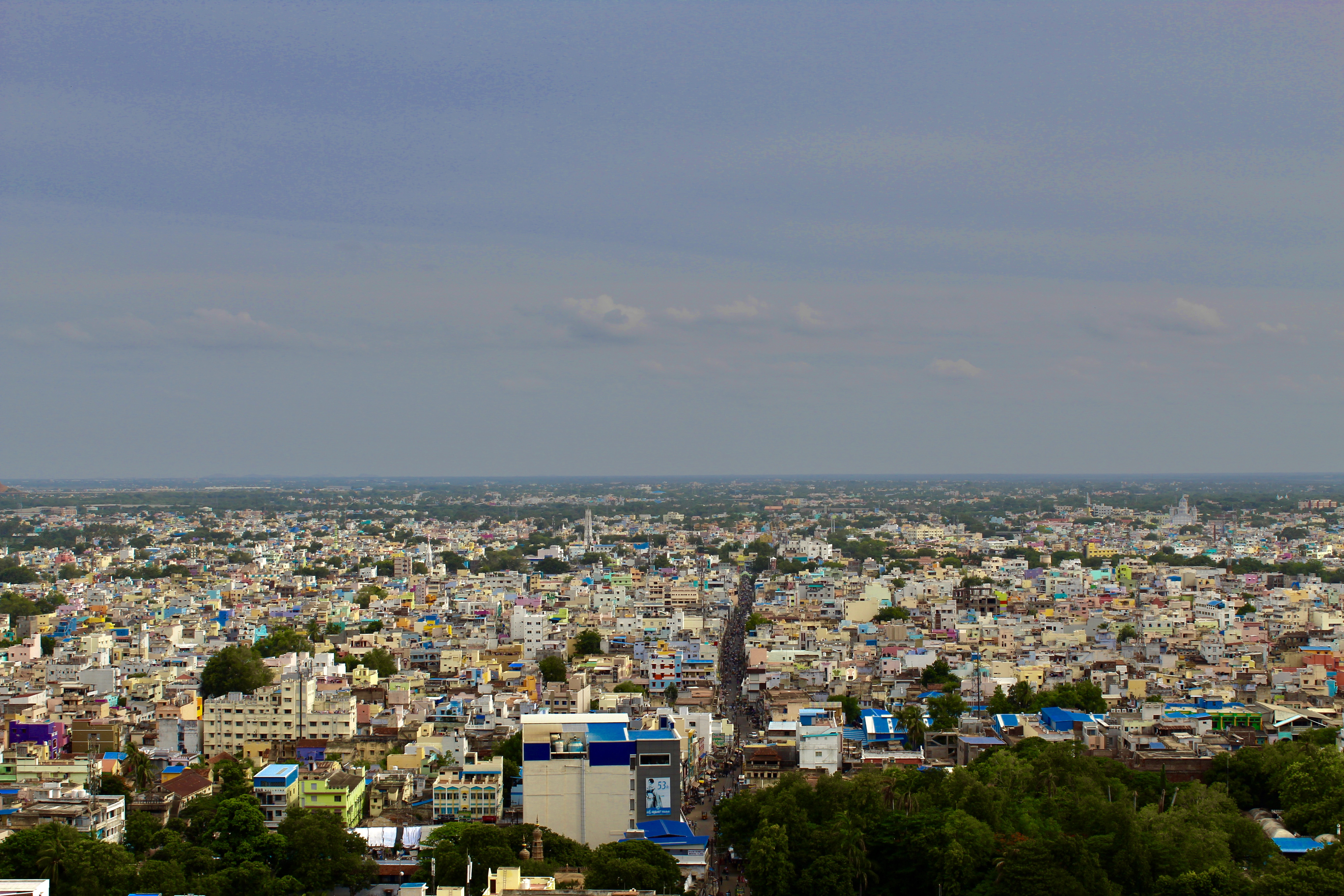
Aerial view of Tiruchirapalli

Historical population
Year	Pop.	±%
1871	76,530	—
1881	84,449	+10.3%
1891	90,609	+7.3%
1901	104,721	+15.6%
1911	123,512	+17.9%
1921	120,422	−2.5%
1931	142,843	+18.6%
1941	159,566	+11.7%
1951	218,921	+37.2%
1961	249,862	+14.1%
1971	307,400	+23.0%
1981	362,045	+17.8%
1991	387,223	+7.0%
2001	752,066	+94.2%
2011	916,857	+21.9%
Sources: 1871 – 1901: 1891 – 1941: 1941 – 1961: 1961–1991: 1991–2001: 2011:

According to the 2011 Indian census, Tiruchirappalli had a population of 847,387, 9.4% of whom were under the age of six, living in 214,529 families within the municipal corporation limits. The recorded population density was 5,768/km^{2} (14,940/sq mi) while the sex ratio was 975 males for every 1,000 females. The Tiruchirappalli urban agglomeration had a population of 1,022,518, and was ranked the fourth largest in Tamil Nadu and the 53rd in India as of 2011. The city had an average literacy rate of 91.37%, significantly higher than the national average of 73.00%. Scheduled Castes and Scheduled Tribes accounted for 10.48% and 0.27% of the population respectively. There were 228,518 people, roughly constituting about 26.96% of the total population, who lived in slums in the city. The daily floating population of the city was estimated at around 250,000.

The city's population is predominantly Hindu. Muslims constitute about twenty percent, and there is also a considerable Christian population. Sikhs and Jains are present in smaller numbers. Roman Catholics in Tiruchirappalli are affiliated to the Roman Catholic Diocese of Tiruchirapalli while Protestants are affiliated to the Trichy–Tanjore Diocese of the Church of South India.

The most widely spoken language is Tamil, but there are significant numbers of Telugu, Gujarati, Kannada, Malayalam and Hindi speakers. Saurashtra is also spoken by some significant minorities. The standard dialect of Tamil spoken is the Central Tamil dialect. There is also a substantial population of Anglo-Indians, (Note: The Anglo-Indians are present in significant numbers in and around all Southern Railway divisional headquarters where they are employed.) and Sri Lankan Tamil migrants, most of whom are housed in refugee camps on the outskirts of the city.

== Administration and politics ==
Administrative officials
Collector	Pratik Tayal, I.A.S.
Municipality officials
Mayor	M.Anbalagan
Commissioner	N. Ponmani I.A.S.
Deputy Mayor	G. Dhivya
Commissioner of Police	N. Kamini I.P.S.
Members of Legislative Assembly
Tiruchirappalli East	VACANT
Tiruchirappalli West	K. N. Nehru
Srirangam	S. Ramesh
Thiruverumbur	Navalpattu S. Viji
Member of Parliament
Tiruchirappalli	Durai Vaiko

Covering 18 square kilometres (6.9 mi^{2}), the municipality of Tiruchirappalli was inaugurated under the Town Improvements Act 1865 on 1 November 1866; it originally consisted of two ex-officers and nine nominated members. Council elections were introduced in 1877 and the first chairman was elected in 1889. The municipality was upgraded to a municipal corporation as per the Tiruchirappalli City Municipal Corporation Act 1994 by inclusion of the erstwhile Srirangam and Golden Rock municipalities. Covering 167.23 square kilometres (64.57 mi^{2}), the municipal corporation comprises 65 wards and four administrative zones; these are Srirangam, Ariyamangalam, Golden Rock and Abhishekapuram.

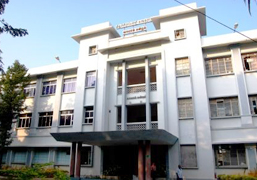
Headquarters of Tiruchirappalli City Municipal Corporation

Tiruchirappalli City Municipal Corporation Council, the legislative body, comprises 65 councillors elected from each of the 65 wards and is headed by a mayor assisted by a Deputy Mayor. The executive wing has seven departments—general administration, revenue, town planning, engineering, public health, information technology and personnel—and is headed by a City Commissioner. The Commissioner is assisted by two executive engineers for the east and west sections, and Assistant Commissioners for personnel, accounts and revenue departments, a public relations officer, a city engineer, a city health officer and an Assistant Commissioner for each of the four zones. A Local Planning Authority for Tiruchirappalli was created on 5 April 1974 as per the Tamil Nadu Town and Country Planning Act of 1971 with the District Collector of Tiruchirappalli as chairman and the assistant director of Town and Country Planning as its member secretary.

The city of Tiruchirappalli is represented in the Tamil Nadu Legislative Assembly by four elected members, one each for the Tiruchirappalli East, Tiruchirappalli West, Srirangam and Thiruverumbur constituencies. J.Jayalalithaa, former chief minister of Tamil Nadu, represented the Srirangam constituency between 2011 and 2015. Tiruchirappalli is also part of the Tiruchirappalli Lok Sabha constituency and once every five years, elects a member to the Lok Sabha—the lower house of the Parliament of India. The Lok Sabha seat has been held by the Indian National Congress for four terms (1957–62, 1984–89, 1989–91 and 1991–96), the Communist Party of India (1962–67, 1971–77 and 1977–80) and the All India Anna Dravida Munnetra Kazhagam (2001–04, 2009–14 and 2014–present) for three terms each) and Bharatiya Janata Party (1998–99 and 1999–2001) for two terms each. Candidates from the Communist Party of India, Tamil Maanila Congress and the Marumalarchi Dravida Munnetra Kazhagam have won once each. Indian politician Rangarajan Kumaramangalam, who served as the Minister of Power in the government of Atal Bihari Vajpayee, was elected to the Lok Sabha from Tiruchirappalli in the 1998 and 1999 elections.

Law and order are enforced by the Tamil Nadu police, which for administrative purposes, has constituted Tiruchirappalli city as a separate district, divided into 18 zonal offices and units, with a total of 38 police stations. The Tiruchirappalli city police force is headed by a Commissioner of police assisted by Deputy Commissioners. Law and order in suburban areas is enforced by the Tiruchirappalli district police. It has the lowest proportion of rape and murder cases in the state.

=== Municipal finance ===
According to financial data published on the CityFinance Portal of the Ministry of Housing and Urban Affairs, the Tiruchirappalli City Municipal Corporation reported total revenue receipts of ₹359 crore (US$43 million) and total expenditure of ₹402 crore (US$48 million) in 2022–23. Tax revenue accounted for about 34.3% of the total revenue, while the corporation received ₹93 crore in grants during the financial year.

== Utility services ==
Electricity supply to the city is regulated and distributed by the Tamil Nadu Electricity Board (TNEB). Tiruchirappalli is the headquarters of the Trichy region of TNEB. The city and its suburbs form the Trichy Metro Electricity Distribution Circle, which is subdivided into six divisions. A chief distribution engineer is stationed at the regional headquarters at Tennur. Water supply is provided by the Tiruchirappalli City Corporation. The city gets its drinking water supply from the Kaveri River and 1,470 bore wells linked to 60 service reservoirs in and around the city. Four of the six head works from which the city gets its water supply are maintained by the municipal corporation and the rest by other agencies.

Pollution has been a major concern in Tiruchirappalli. The Tamil Nadu Pollution Control Board has set up five stations in the city to check the quality of air. As of 2012, about 432 tonnes (432,000 kg) of solid waste are produced in the city every day. Solid waste management in the city is handled by the corporation; places such as the Gandhi Market, Central Bus terminus and the Chathram bus terminus are being monitored by other agencies. The principal landfill is at Ariyamangalam. Waste water management in the Trichy-Srirangam underground drainage (UGD) areas is handled by the Tamil Nadu Water Supply and Drainage Board (TWAD) and in other areas by the Tiruchirappalli Municipal Corporation. As of 2013, there were a total of 40,580 UGD connections maintained by the municipal corporation. In 2020, it is estimated that 31% of the city is covered under a networked sewage system; however, As of September 2020, the corporation has fast-tracked its project to cover the entire city, funded jointly by urban local body, Tamil Nadu Urban Finance and Infrastructure Development Corporation Ltd (Tufidco) and Asian Development Bank. The high toxicity of the waste water released by the Trichy Distilleries and Chemicals Limited (TDCL) is a major cause of concern for the corporation. The corporation's annual expenditure for the year 2010–11 was estimated to be ₹1,559.4 million (equivalent to ₹3.5 billion or US$36 million in 2026). In 2013, researchers from Bharathidasan University assessed water quality in the Tiruchirappalli area and concluded that although the quality of the groundwater was suitable for human consumption, the quality of the pond water in the city was "not fit for human usage, agricultural or industrial purposes".

Under the National Urban Sanitation Policy, Tiruchirappalli was ranked sixth in India and first in Tamil Nadu on the basis of sanitation for the year 2009–10. In January 2010, Tiruchirappalli became the first city in India where open defecation was prevented in all its slums. In a 2016 survey conducted by the Ministry of Urban Development, as a part of the Swachh Bharat Abhiyan campaign, Tiruchirappalli was ranked third in the list of cleanest cities in India.

Under the ease of living index 2018 published by the Ministry of Housing and Urban Affairs, Tiruchirappalli was ranked twelfth in India and first in Tamil Nadu among the 111 cities considered. The ranking framework was categorised into four pillars, namely Institutional, Social, Economic and Physical, which comprised 78 indicators such as urban transport, waste water management, solid waste management and governance.

Tiruchirappalli comes under the Tiruchi Telecom District of the Bharat Sanchar Nigam Limited (BSNL), India's state-owned telecom and internet services provider. There are about 20,000 business telephone subscribers in the city. Both Global System for Mobile Communications (GSM) and Code division multiple access (CDMA) mobile services are available. BSNL also provides broadband internet services. BSNL began offering wireless internet services with the commencement of Evolution-Data Optimized (EVDO) transmission in 2008. Tiruchirappalli is one of the few cities in India where BSNL's Caller Line Identification (CLI)-based internet service Netone is available. Softnet (STPI), Tata VSNL, Bharti and Reliance are other major broadband internet service providers in the city.

Tiruchirappalli has a regional passport office, the second in Tamil Nadu, which commenced its operations on 23 March 1983 bifurcated from Chennai region. After Coimbatore and Madurai regional office were established in late 2000s by bifurcating from Trichy region, currently the office caters to the needs of Trichy and seven adjacent districts namely, Karur, Nagappattinam, Perambalur, Pudukkottai, Thanjavur, Ariyalur and Tiruvarur.

== Economy ==
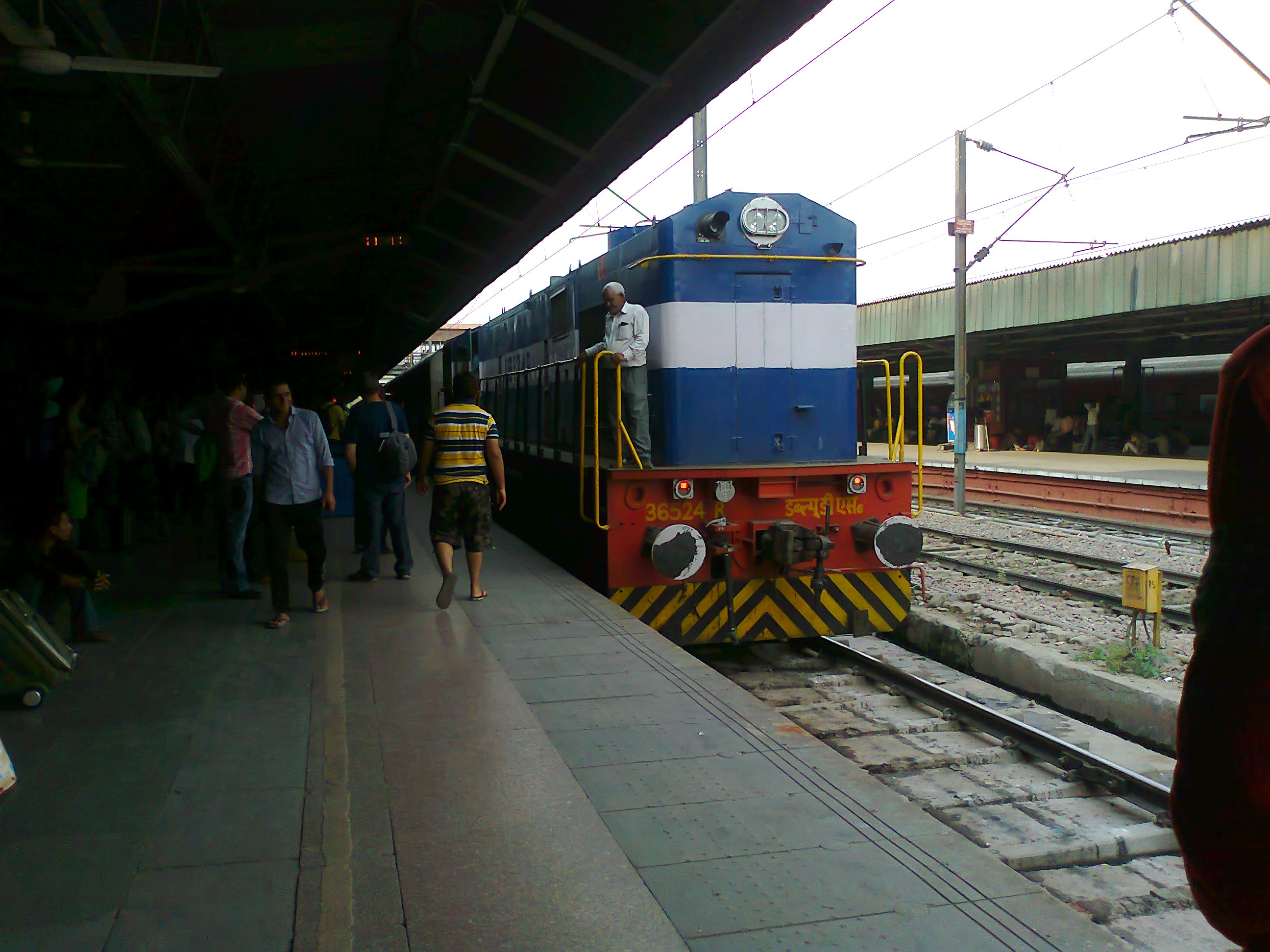
A WDS6 locomotive manufactured at the Golden Rock Railway Workshop

During British rule, Tiruchirappalli was known for its tanneries, cigar-manufacturing units and oil presses. At its peak, more than 12 million cigars were manufactured and exported annually. Tanned hides and skins from Tiruchirappalli were exported to the United Kingdom. The city has a number of retail and wholesale markets, the most prominent among them being the Gandhi Market, which also serves people from other parts of the district. Other notable markets in the city are the flower bazaar in Srirangam and the mango market at Mambazha Salai. The suburb of Manachanallur is known for its rice mills, where polished Ponni rice is produced.

Tiruchirappalli is a major engineering equipment manufacturing and fabrication hub in India. The Golden Rock Railway Workshop, which moved to Tiruchirappalli from Nagapattinam in 1928, is one of the three railway workshop–cum–production units in Tamil Nadu. The workshops produced 650 conventional and low-container flat wagons during 2007–2008.

A high-pressure boiler manufacturing plant was set up by Bharat Heavy Electricals Limited (BHEL), India's largest public sector engineering company, in May 1965. This was followed by a seamless steel plant and a boiler auxiliaries plant. In 2010, the Tiruchirappalli unit of the company contributed to nearly 30 per cent of its total sales, making it the largest of all units. As of 2011, the Tiruchirappalli division employed about 10,000 people, and is supported by a number of ancillary industries producing almost 250,000 tonnes (250,000,000 kg) of fabricated materials. These ancillary units together with BHEL contribute nearly 60 per cent of India's steel fabrication, earning the city the title, "Energy equipment and fabrication capital of India". Other important industries in Tiruchirappalli include Trichy Distilleries and Chemicals Limited (TDCL), which was established at Senthaneerpuram in the former Golden Rock municipality in 1966. and the Trichy Steel Rolling Mills, which was started as a private limited company on 27 June 1961. The Trichy Distilleries and Chemicals Limited manufactures rectified spirit, acetaldehyde, acetic acid, acetic anhydride and ethyl acetate. It is one of the biggest private sector distilleries in Tamil Nadu and produced 13.5 megalitres (3.0 million imperial gallons) of spirit alcohol between December 2005 and November 2006. The Ordnance Factories Board runs a weapons manufacturing unit and a Heavy Alloy Penetrator Project (HAPP) facility; the latter was set up in the late 1980s and consists of a flexible manufacturing system (FMS)—the first of its kind in India.

From the late 1980s, a synthetic gem industry was developed in the city; the gemstones are cut and polished in Tiruchirappalli district and in Pudukottai district. In 1990, the Indian government launched a scheme to increase employment by boosting the production of American diamonds and training local artisans in semi-automated machinery and technology. The local gem industry was reportedly generating annual revenues of ₹100 million (equivalent to ₹650 million or US$6.8 million in 2026) by the mid-1990s. Concerns have been raised over the employment of children aged 9–14 in the gem cutting and polishing industry. As a result, in 1996, Tiruchirappalli district was selected to be involved in the National Child Labour Project and in the running of special schools to educate working children.

As of 2010, the Tiruchirappalli region annually exports around ₹262.1 million (equivalent to ₹640 million or US$6.7 million in 2026) of software. The ELCOT IT Park Trichy—the city's first IT park—commissioned at a cost of ₹600 million (equivalent to ₹1.5 billion or US$15 million in 2026) was inaugurated in December 2010. Set up by the Electronics Corporation of Tamil Nadu, the park occupies an area of 59.74 hectares (147.6 acres) and constitutes a Special Economic Zone.

Employing a workforce of over 1,500, more than six companies including Vuram, iLink Systems Pvt. Ltd., Scientific Publishing Company, Vdart Technologies, GI Tech Gaming Co. India Pvt. Ltd., VR Della IT Services Pvt. Ltd., and the Tamil Nadu Disaster Recovery Centre function out of the existing building, occupying the entire built-up space. The ELCOT IT Park Trichy is in close proximity to the Tiruchi International Airport. The facility was highlighted through the two editions of Global Investors Meet and became a key factor for the demand for the built-up space.

== Culture ==
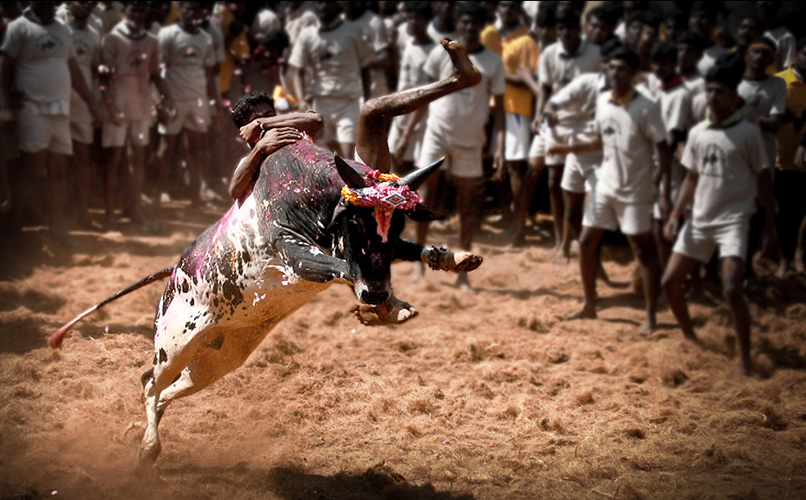
A Jallikattu match

A resident of Tiruchirappalli is generally referred to as a Tiruchiite. Situated at the edge of the Kaveri Delta, the culture of Tiruchirappalli is predominantly Brahminical, prevalent elsewhere in the delta. With a substantial population of students and migrant industrial workers from different parts of India, Tiruchirappalli has a more cosmopolitan outlook than the surrounding countryside. The main festival celebrated in Tiruchirappalli is Pongal, a regional harvest festival celebrated during January. As part of the Pongal celebrations, Jallikattu, a bull-taming village sport played on the last day of the festival, is occasionally held on the outskirts of the city. Aadi Perukku, Samayapuram flower festival, Vaikunta Ekadasi, Srirangam car festival, and the Teppakulam float festival are some of the prominent festivals that are held locally. Bakrid and Eid al-Fitr are also widely celebrated, owing to the substantial number of Muslims in the city. Nationwide festivals such as the Gregorian New Year, Christmas, Deepavali and Holi are also celebrated in Tiruchirappalli.

The 12th century Tamil epic Kambaramayanam was first recited at the Ranganathaswamy temple in Srirangam. In 1771, Rama Natakam, a musical drama written Arunachala Kavi and based on the Ramayana, was also performed there. Tiruchirappalli was home to some of the prominent Carnatic musicians—including Lalgudi Jayaraman, Srirangam Kannan and A. K. C. Natarajan—and scholars such as T. S. Murugesan Pillai, Kundalam Rangachariar and K. A. P. Viswanatham. Composers, poets and vocalists such as G. Ramanathan, T. K. Ramamoorthy, Vaali and P. Madhuri, who have made significant contributions to Tamil film music hail from the city.

Textile weaving, leather-work and gem cutting are some of the important crafts practised in Tiruchirappalli. Wooden idols of Hindu gods and goddesses are sold at Poompuhar, the crafts emporium run by the Government of Tamil Nadu. The Trichy Travel Federation (TTF) was formed on 5 May 2009 to promote Tiruchirappalli as a favourable tourist destination. The federation organises an annual food festival called Suvai. Lack of infrastructure has been a major deterrent to the city's tourism industry.

== Landmarks ==
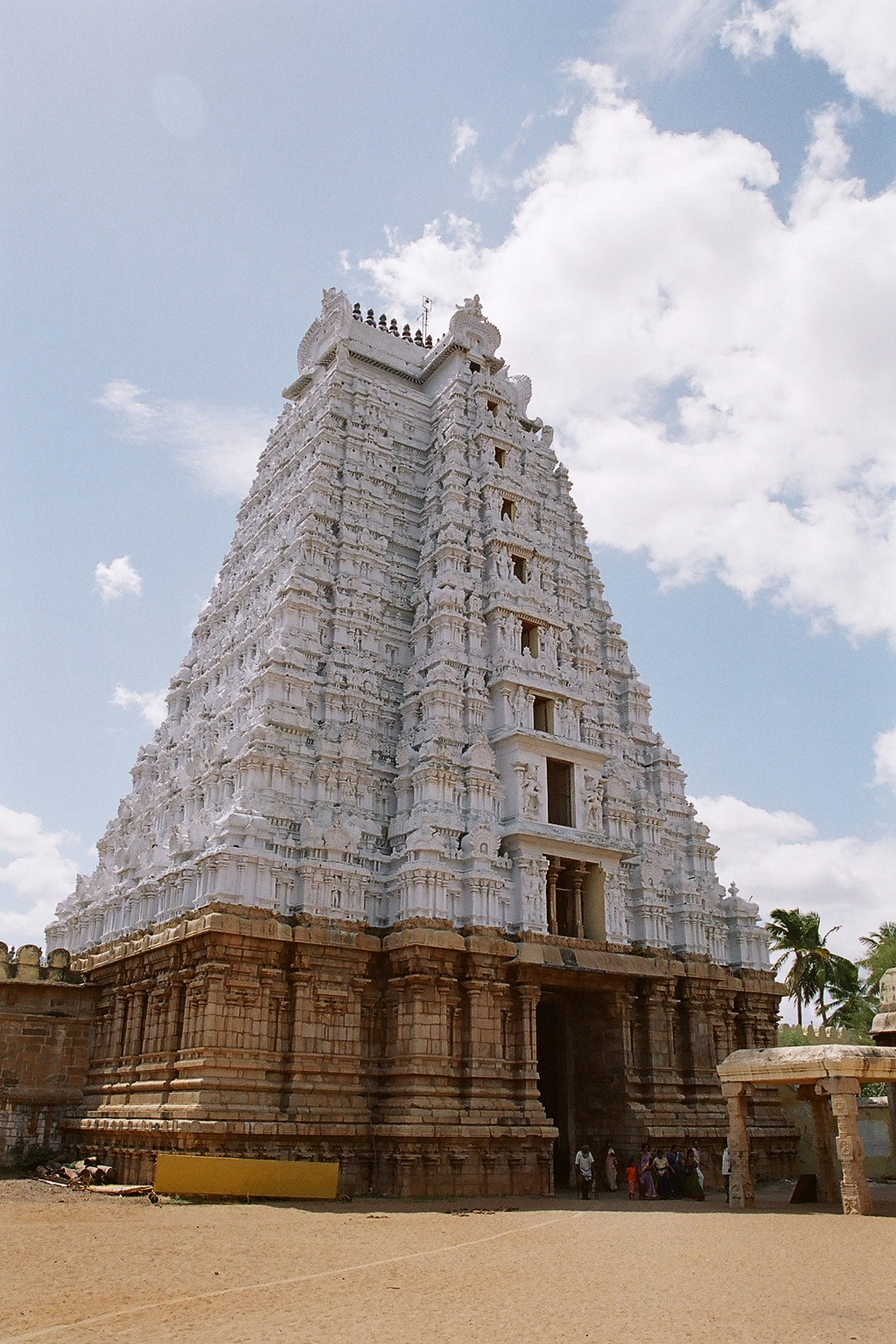
The "Vellai Gopuram" (white tower) on the eastern entrance of the Srirangam temple named after a Devadasi

Once a part of the Chola kingdom, Tiruchirappalli has a number of exquisitely sculpted temples and fortresses.

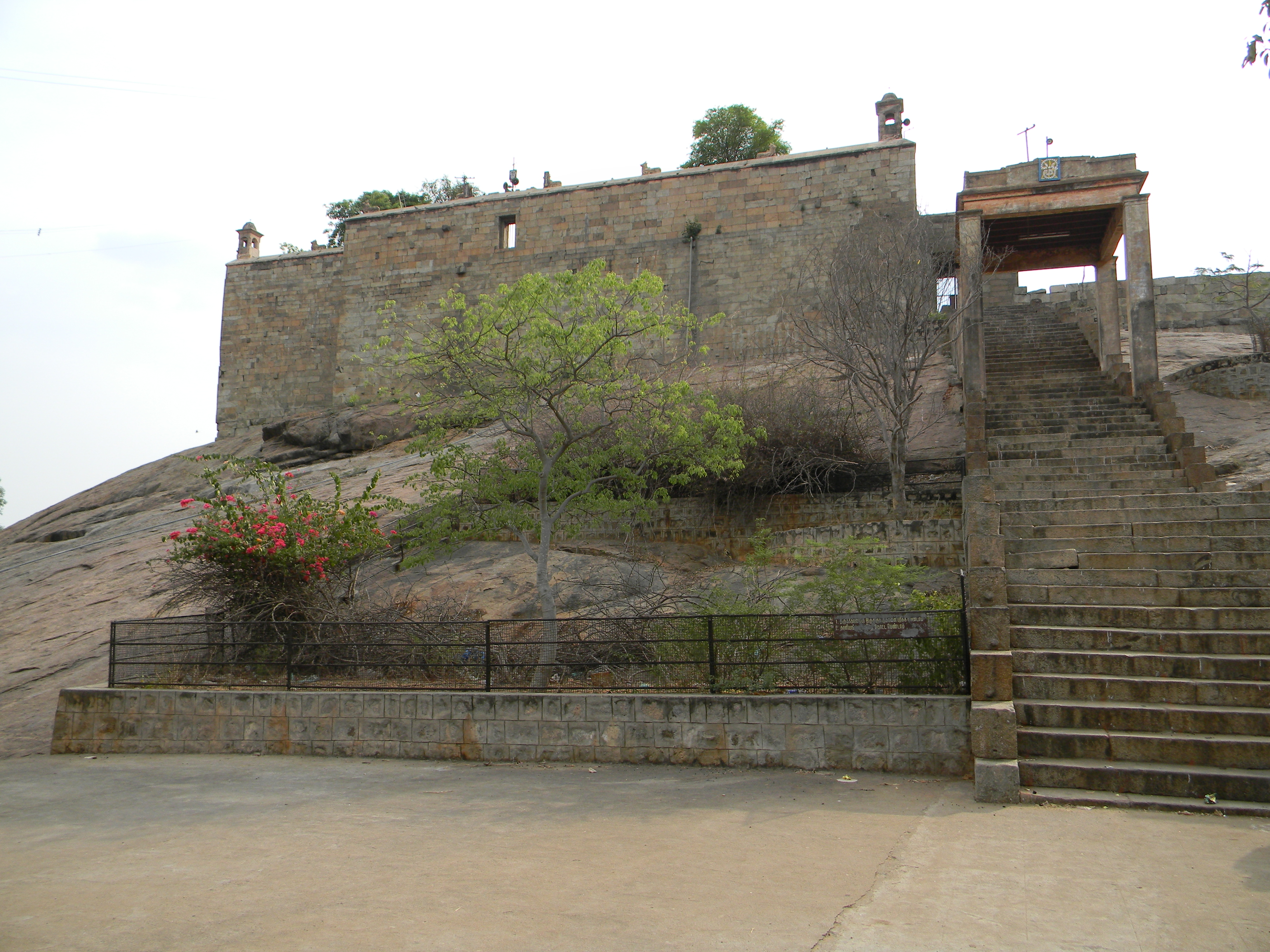
The Erumbeeswarar Temple has been designated a protected monument by the Archaeological Survey of India.

Most of the temples, including the Rockfort temples, the Ranganathaswamy Temple at Srirangam, the Jambukeswarar Temple at Thiruvanaikkaval, the Samayapuram Mariamman Temple, the Erumbeeswarar Temple, Gneeliwaneswarar Temple at Thiruppaingneeli and the temples in Urayur, are built in the Dravidian style of architecture; the Ranganathaswamy Temple and Jambukeswarar Temple are often counted among the best examples of this style. The rock-cut cave temples of the Rockfort, along with the gateway and the Erumbeeswarar Temple, are listed as monuments of national importance by the Archaeological Survey of India.

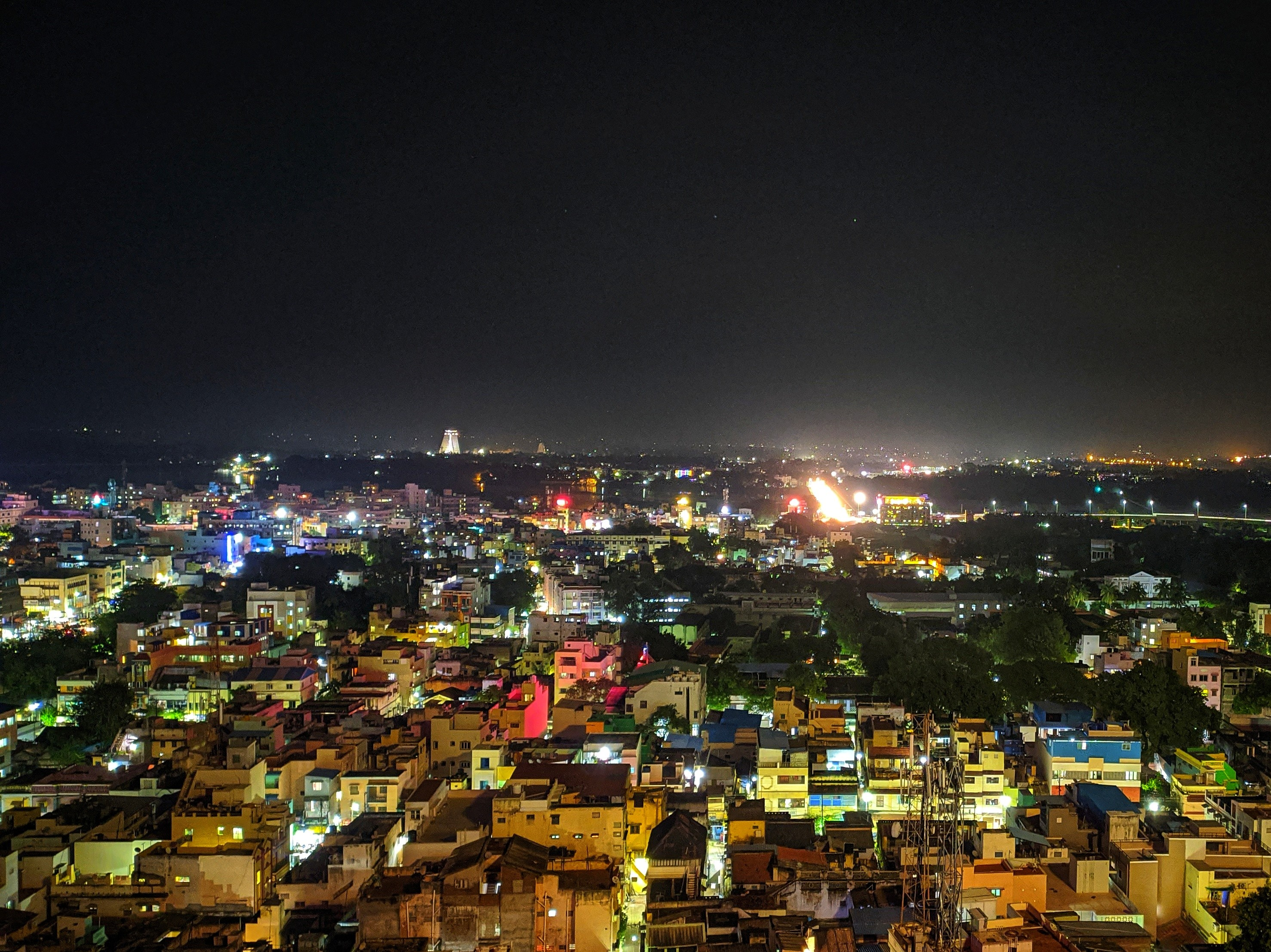
Night View of Trichy from the top of Rockfort, photographed from the temple window.

Considered one of the symbols of Tiruchirappalli, the Rockfort is a fortress which stands atop a 273-foot-high rock. It consists of a set of monolithic rocks accommodating many rock-cut cave temples. Originally built by the Pallavas, it was later reconstructed by the Madurai Nayaks and Vijayanagara rulers. The temple complex has three shrines, two of which are dedicated to Lord Ganesha, one at the foot and the Ucchi Pillayar Temple at the top, and the Thayumanavar Temple between them. The Thayumanavar temple, the largest of the three, houses a shrine for Pārvatī as well as the main deity. As per a legend, Vayu Bhaghvan and Adiseshan had a dispute to find out who is superior, to prove the superiority adiseshan encircled the Kailasam, Vayu tried to remove this encircle by creating santamarutham (Twister). Because of the santamarutham, eight kodumudigal (parts) fell from kailasam into eight different places which are Thirugonamalai (Trincomalee, Sri Lanka), Thirukalahasti, Thiruchiramalai (Rock fort), Thiruenkoimalai, Rajathagiri, Neerthagiri, Ratnagiri, and Swethagiri Thirupangeeli.

The Rockfort is visible from almost every part of the city's north. The Teppakulam at the foot of the Rockfort is surrounded by bazaars. It has a mandapa at its centre.

The Ranganathaswamy Temple, dedicated to the Hindu god Vishnu, is located on the island of Srirangam. Often cited as the largest functioning Hindu temple in the world, it has a perimeter of 4,116 metres (13,504 ft) and occupies 156 acres (630,000 m^{2}). Considered to be among the 108 Divya Desams (Holy shrines of Lord Vishnu), the temple is believed to house the mortal remains of the Vaishnavite saint and philosopher Ramanujacharya. Originally built by the Cholas, the temple was later renovated by the Pandyas, the Hoysalas, the Madurai Nayaks and the Vijayanagar empire between the 9th and 16th centuries AD. There are 21 gopurams (towers), of which the Rajagopuram is 236 feet (72 m). According to the Limca Book of Records, it was the tallest temple tower in the world until 1999.

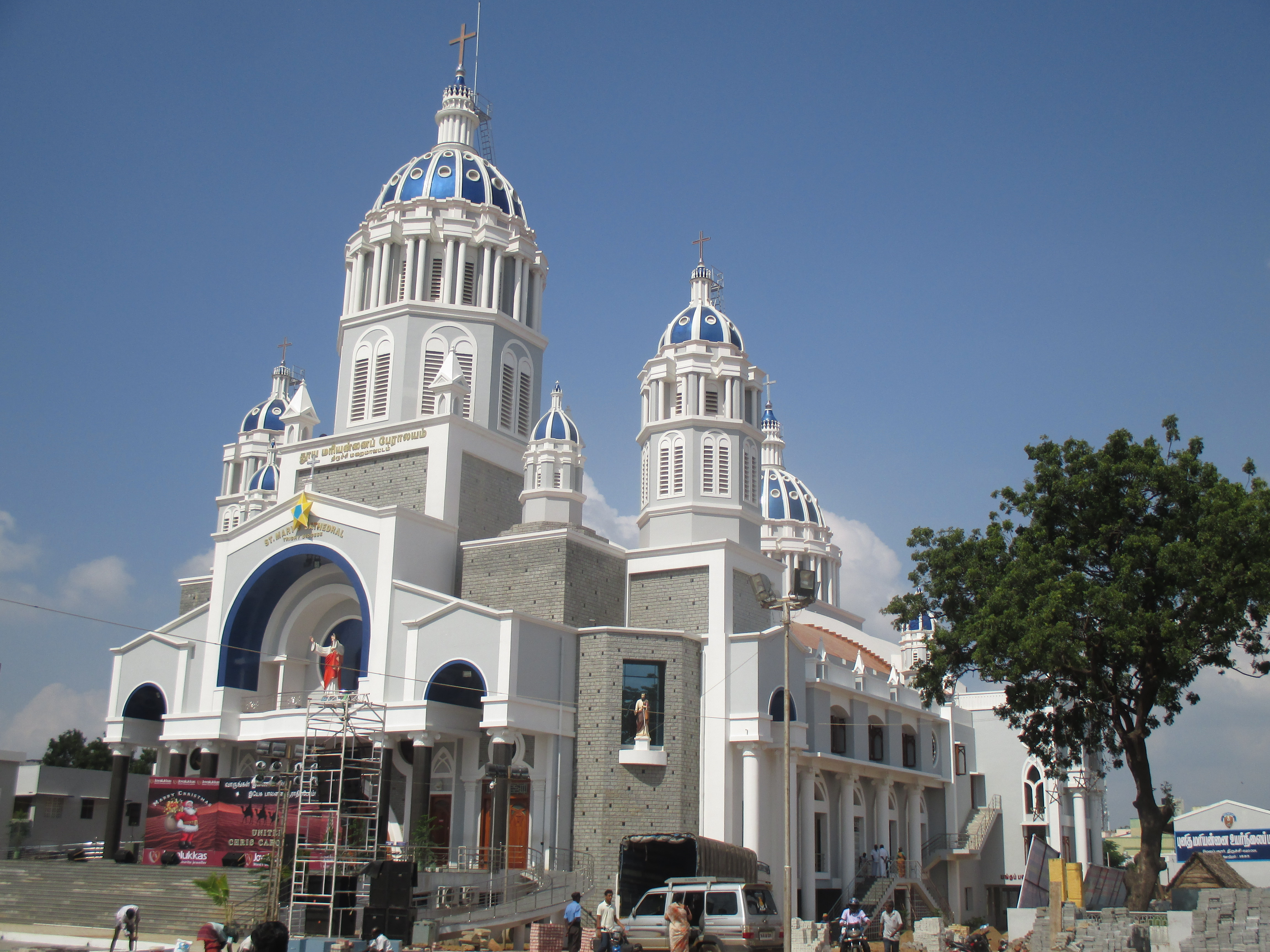
St. Mary's Cathedral

The Jambukeswarar Temple at Thiruvanaikkaval and the Erumbeeswarar Temple at Thiruverumbur were built in the rule of the Medieval Cholas. The Jambukeswarar Temple is one of the Pancha Bhoota Stalams dedicated to Lord Shiva; it is the fifth largest temple complex in Tamil Nadu. The city's best known mosque is the Nadir Shah Mosque. The Christ Church constructed by the German Protestant missionary Christian Friedrich Schwarz in 1766 and the Our Lady of Lourdes Church are noted examples of Gothic Revival architecture in the city.

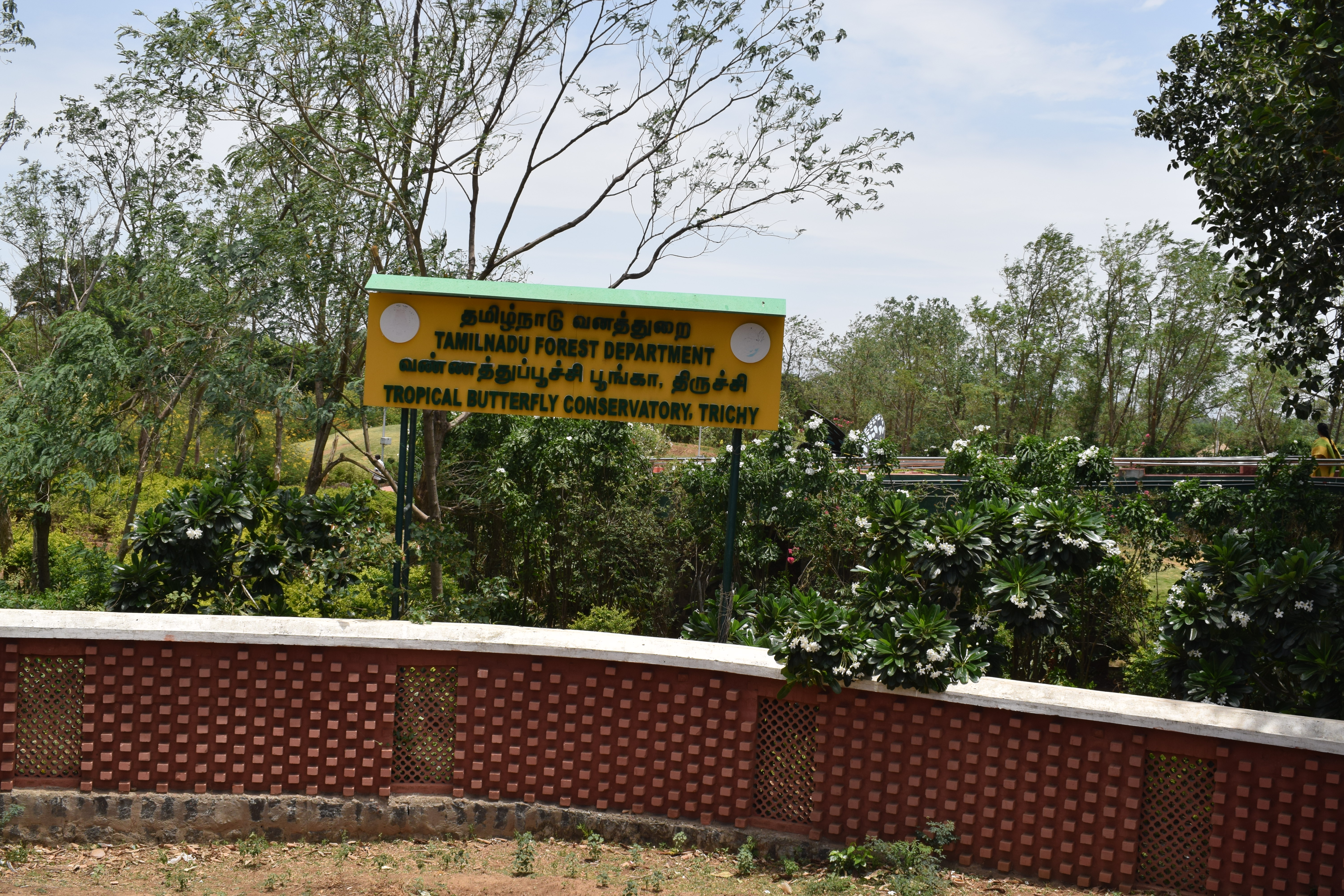
Tropical butterfly conservatory

The Chokkanatha Nayak Palace, which houses the Rani Mangammal Mahal, was built by the Madurai Nayaks in the 17th century; it has now been converted into a museum. The Nawab's palace, the Railway Heritage Centre, the Upper Anaicut constructed by Sir Arthur Cotton, and the world's oldest functional dam, the Grand Anaicut, are some of the other important structures in Tiruchirappalli.

== Education ==
Tiruchirappalli has been recognised in India as an important educational centre since the time of British rule. St. Joseph's College, which opened in Nagapattinam in 1846 and transferred to Tiruchirappalli in 1883, is one of the oldest educational institutions in South India. The Society for the Propagation of the Gospel (SPG) college, established in 1883, is a premium missionary institution in the city.

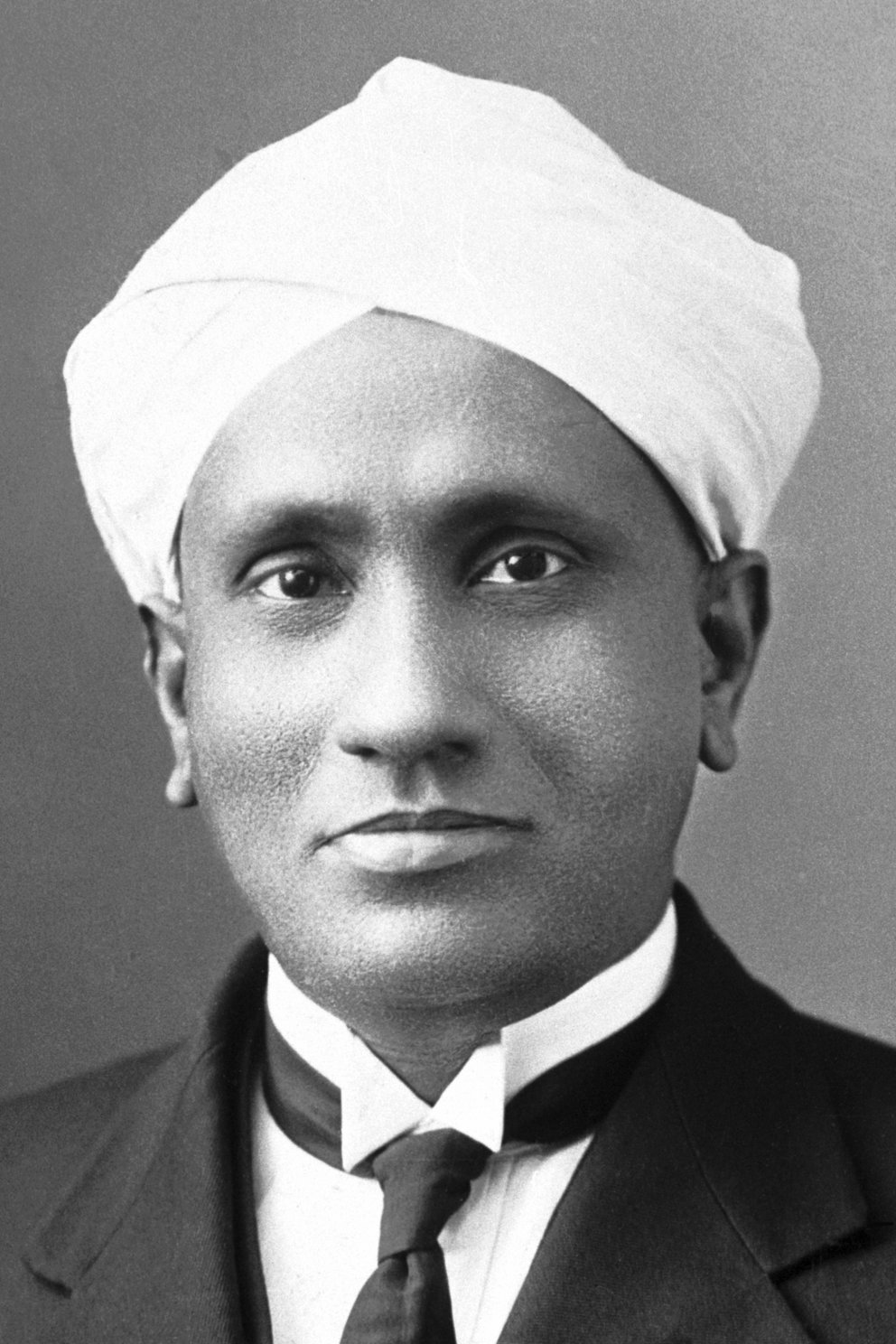
India's second Nobel laureate, C. V. Raman, was born in Tiruchirappalli.

As of 2013, Tiruchirappalli has 45 arts and science colleges, 40 polytechnic colleges and 13 colleges that offer management education. National Institute of Technology, Tiruchirappalli is located in a area of 800 acres. National Institutional Ranking Framework ranked this NIT the first among other others in India. The St. Joseph's College, National College, Bishop Heber College, Jamal Mohamed College, MIET Engineering College, and the Government Law College are prominent colleges providing higher education in the arts and sciences. There are approximately 35 engineering colleges in and around the city. The National Institute of Technology, Tiruchirappalli established by the government in 1964 as the Regional Engineering College, has a campus at Thuvakudi on the outskirts of Tiruchirappalli. National Institute of Technology-Trichy (NIT-T) released the enhanced version of e-commerce mobile application, the institute Sponsored by the Department of Science and Technology

The Anbil Dharmalingam Agricultural College and Research Institute was established as a constituent college of Tamil Nadu Agricultural University in 1989, and the National Research Centre for Banana offer higher education and research in agriculture. The Tiruchirappalli branch of Anna University was established after the bifurcation of Anna University in 2007. 64 self-financing colleges which offer courses in engineering, architecture, management and computer applications in the districts of Ariyalur, Cuddalore, Nagapattinam, Perambalur, Pudukkottai, Thanjavur and Tiruvarur are affiliated to Anna University. The SRM Group of Colleges established the SRM Institute of Science and Technology at Irungalur near Tiruchirappalli; this was followed by Chennai Medical College and Hospital in 2007. A proposal by the group to include the institutions in SRM University is under review by the Ministry of Human Resources Development of the Government of India.

The Bharathidasan University was established in Tiruchirappalli in 1982 and controls 104 colleges in Tiruchirappalli district and seven neighbouring districts. The university also runs a management school, the Bharathidasan Institute of Management in the city in collaboration with BHEL. The Indian Institute of Management Tiruchirappalli was set up during the Eleventh Five-Year Plan, along with five other IIMs opened during the 2011–12 academic season. In 2013, the Ministry of Human Resource Development (MHRD) approved Indian Institute of Information Technology (IIIT), and the Tamil Nadu National Law School, modelled on the National Law School of India University, both started their operations in the city. The city is also the regional headquarters of the Dakshina Bharat Hindi Prachar Sabha for the state of Tamil Nadu.

There are 200 higher secondary schools in Tiruchirappalli; notable ones are the St. Johns Vestry Anglo Indian Higher Secondary School, Campion Anglo-Indian Higher Secondary School, St Joseph's Anglo Indian Girls Higher Secondary School, Railway Mixed Higher Secondary School, Higher Secondary School for Boys, Srirangam and RSK Higher Secondary School.

Notable people who were either born or educated at Tiruchirappalli include C. V. Raman, A. P. J. Abdul Kalam, Sujatha, Vaali, G. N. Ramachandran, and former President of India R. Venkataraman.

== Sports ==
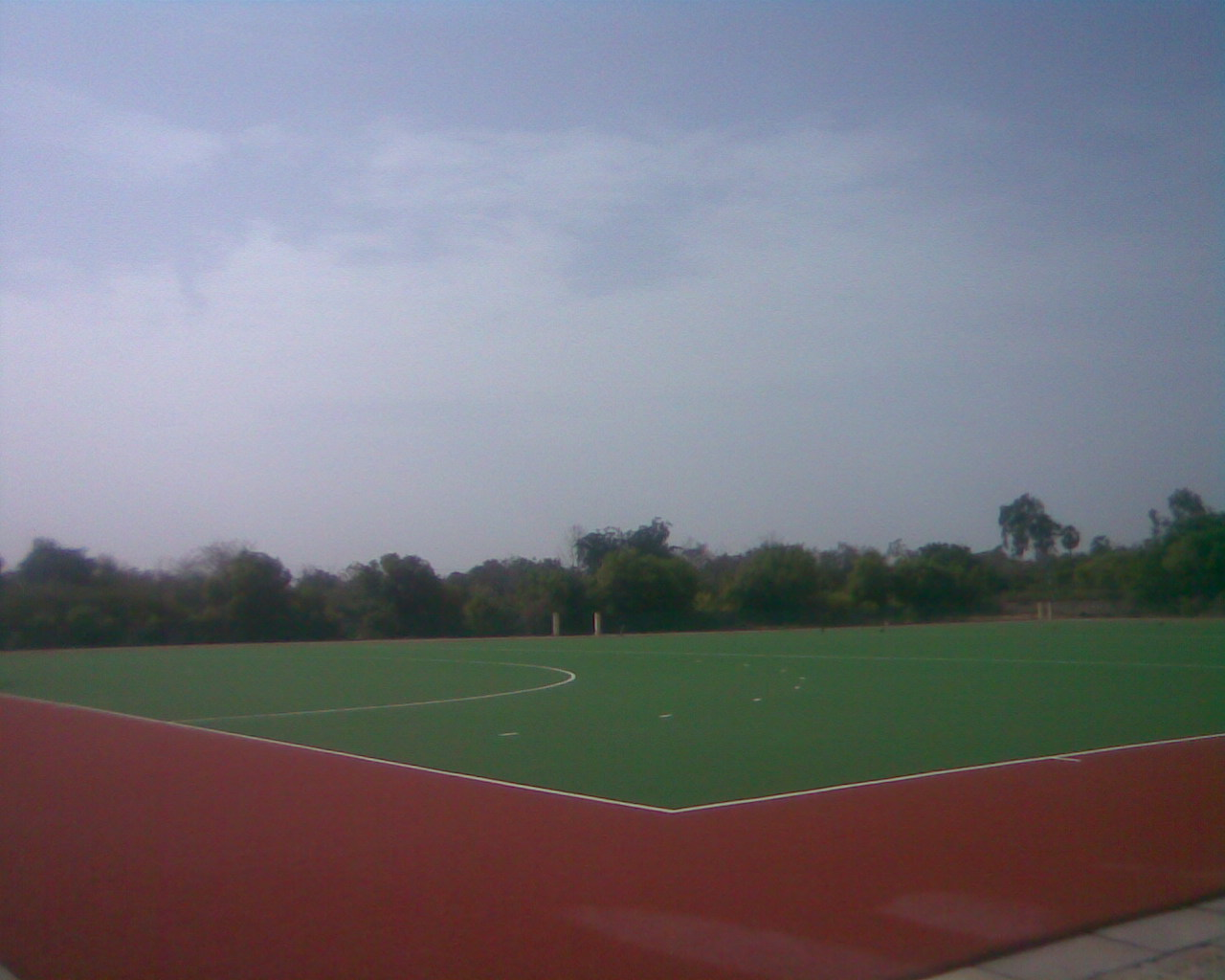
Synthetic turf hockey ground in the Anna Stadium

Hockey and cricket are the most popular sports in Tiruchirappalli. Former Indian hockey goalkeepers Charles Cornelius and Leslie Fernandez; Rajagopal Sathish who represents the Mumbai Indians in the Indian Premier League; and Dharmaraj Ravanan who represents Chennai City F.C. in the I League; all hail from the city. The Anna Stadium complex is the main venue for sports in the city; it hosts an indoor stadium and an astro turf hockey ground. The stadium complex also includes a football ground, an athletic track, a swimming pool, a gymnasium, a badminton court and a hostel for the athletes. The Tiruchirappalli District Cricket Association (TDCA) is one of the constituents of the Tamil Nadu Cricket Association, and regulates school, college and club cricket in the district. First class cricket matches were held at the Jawaharlal Nehru Stadium—formerly the Khajamalai Stadium. At the association's golden jubilee celebrations in 2008–09, plans for the establishment of another cricket stadium and an academy in the outskirts of Tiruchirappalli city were mooted. The Mannarpuram Cricket Academy is one of the noted cricket coaching academies in Tiruchirappalli. Domestic association football, tennis and volleyball tournaments are held in and around the city. Tiruchirappalli hosted the Federation Cup, a knockout-style club football tournament in 1984 and an open chess tournament organised by FIDE in 2006.

== Media ==
According to the Registrar of Newspapers in India, more than 100 newspapers have been registered in Tiruchirappalli as of 2013. The weekly newspaper Wednesday Review, founded in 1905, is the first prominent journal to be published in Tiruchirappalli. Among the major English-language newspapers being published in Tiruchirappalli are The Hindu which launched a Tiruchirappalli edition in 2004, and The New Indian Express, which was publishing in Tiruchirappalli before The Hindu. Some of the important Tamil-language newspapers that publish a Tiruchirappalli edition are Dina Thanthi Dina Mani, Dina Malar, Malai Malar, Dinakaran, Tamil Murasu and Tamil Sudar. The popular Tamil weekly Ananda Vikatan launched a local supplement for Tiruchirappalli in 2011.

The first radio transmission station in Tiruchirappalli was opened by All India Radio (AIR) on 16 May 1939. AIR started providing direct-to-home enabled radio broadcasting service from 2006. In 2007, the AIR launched Ragam, a separate Carnatic music station, from the city. Apart from the government-owned AIR, private FM radio stations such as Hello and Suryan FM and Mirchi 95.0 from Tiruchirappalli. Indira Gandhi National Open University's Gyan Vani started broadcasting from the city in 2008. Tiruchirappalli's first campus community radio station was started by Holy Cross College on 22 December 2006.

Television broadcasting from Chennai was started on 15 August 1975. Satellite television channels have been available since 1991. Direct-to-home cable television services are provided by DD Direct Plus and various other operators.

== Transport ==
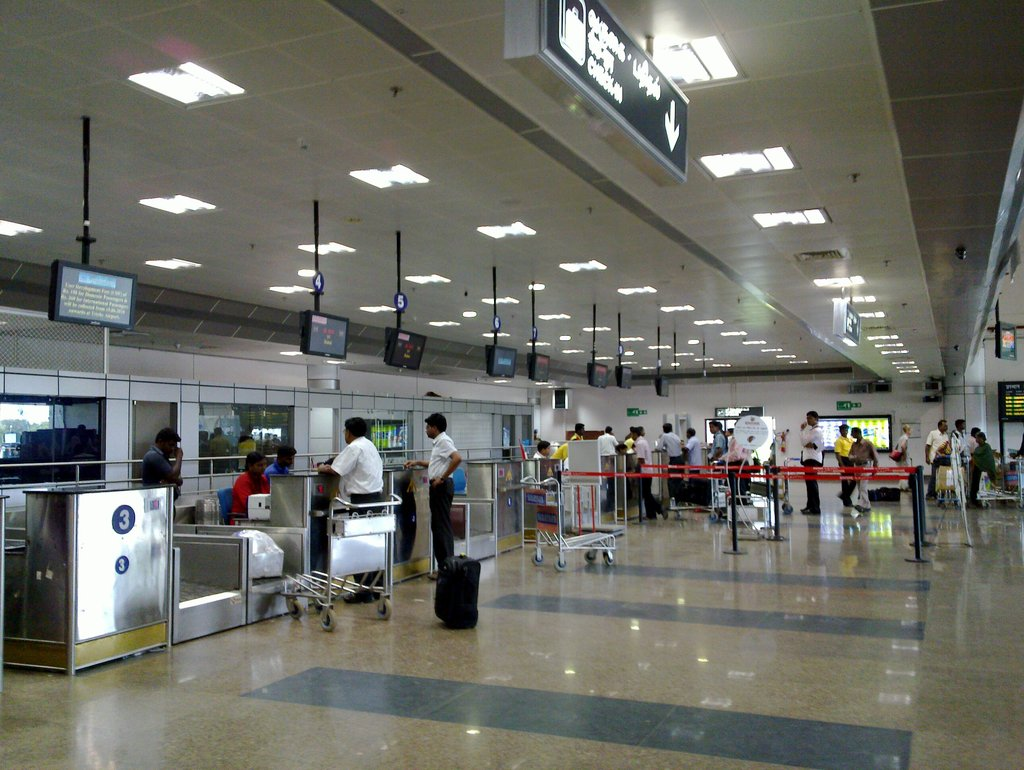
Check-in counters at the integrated terminal of Tiruchirappalli International Airport.

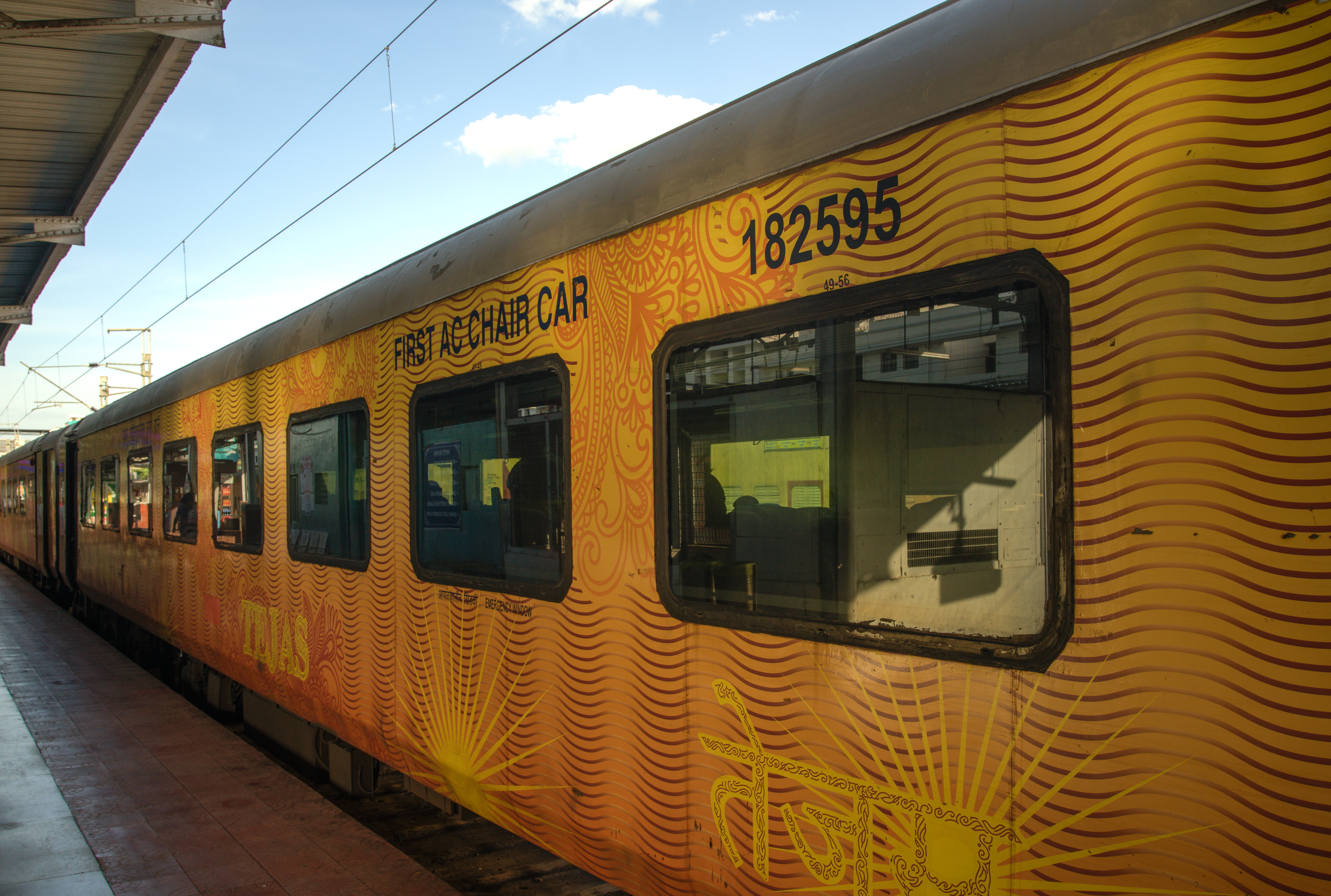
Madurai-Chennai Tejas Express at Trichy Junction

The most commonly used modes of local transport in Tiruchirappalli are the state government-owned Tamil Nadu State Transport Corporation (TNSTC) buses, and auto rickshaws. Tiruchirappalli forms a part of the Kumbakonam division of the TNSTC. The city has two major bus termini; Chatram Bus Stand and Central Bus Stand, both of which operate intercity services and local transport to suburban areas. A third major bus terminus, the Panjappur Integrated Bus Terminus, was recently inaugurated and is now operational, serving as a new hub for long-distance and mofussil services. The municipal administration and water supply department has accorded administrative sanction to construct new bus stands in three central districts at a total cost of 31.8 crore. The state infrastructure amenities promotion committee has approved providing 50% of the estimated cost in 10 towns and cities across the state.

Tiruchirappalli sits at the junction of two major National Highways—NH 45 and NH 67. NH 45 is one of the most congested highways in south India and carries almost 10,000 lorries on the Tiruchirappalli–Chennai stretch every night. Other National Highways originating in the city is NH336 connecting Trichy-Pudukkottai-Devakottai, this two lane route is going to be converted to four lane route till Karaikudi as there is a massive increments in road PCU usages. State highways that start from the city include SH 25 and SH 62. Tiruchirappalli has 715.85 km (444.81 mi) of road maintained by the municipal corporation. A semi-ring road connecting all the National Highways is being constructed to ease traffic congestion in the city. As of 2013, approximately 328,000 two-wheelers, 93,500 cars and 10,000 public transport vehicles operate within the city limits, apart from the 1,500 inter-city buses that pass through Tiruchirappalli daily. Tiruchirappalli suffers from traffic congestion mainly because of its narrow roads and absence of an integrated bus station.

Passenger trains also carry a significant number of passengers from nearby towns. The Great Southern of India Railway Company was established in 1853 with its headquarters at England. In 1859, the company constructed its first railway line connecting Tiruchirappalli and Nagapattinam. The company merged with the Carnatic Railway Company in 1874 to form the South Indian Railway Company with Tiruchirappalli as its headquarters. The city retained the position until 1908 when the company's headquarters was transferred to Madras. Tiruchirappalli Junction is one of the busiest in India. It constitutes a separate division of the Southern Railway. Tiruchirappalli has rail connectivity with most important cities and towns in India. Other railway stations in the city include Tiruchirappalli Fort, Tiruchirappalli Town, Srirangam, Tiruchirappalli Palakkarai, Golden Rock (Ponmalai), Tiruverumbur, Pikshandarkoil,Manjatidal and Uttamarkoil. Non-stop flight time from Chennai to Trichy is between 1 hr to 1 hr 30 mins depending on the aircraft's cruising speed, technical condition and weather/wind.

Tiruchirappalli is served by Tiruchirappalli International Airport (IATA: TRZ, ICAO: VOTR), 5 km (3.1 mi) from the city centre. The airport handles fivefold more international air traffic than domestic services, making it the only airport in India with this huge variation. It serves as a gateway to immigrants from South-east Asian countries There are regular flights to Chennai, Mumbai, Delhi, Bangalore, Hyderabad, Colombo, Dubai, Kuala Lumpur, and Singapore. The airport handled more than 1 million passengers and 2012 tonnes of cargo during the fiscal year 2013–14.

== See also ==
- Tiruchirappalli metropolitan area
- Sri Ranganathaswamy Temple
- List of people from Tiruchirappalli
- Classification of Indian cities
- Mukkombu
- ELCOT IT Park Trichy
- Tiruchirappalli Rock Fort
- Largest Indian cities by GDP

== Bibliography ==
- Abram, David (2003). South India: Rough Guide Travel Guides. Rough Guides. ISBN 978-1-84353-103-6. Archived from the original on 1 August 2020.
- The Administrator. Lal Bahadur Shastri National Academy of Administration. 1996. Archived from the original on 3 January 2014.
- Ahmad, Mohd Rizwan (1 January 2003). Inflation Accounting Practices in India's Corporate Sector. Atlantic Publishers & Dist. ISBN 978-81-269-0216-3. Archived from the original on 8 August 2020.
- Ahmed, Abad (1980). Developing effective organizations: a National Seminar on Human Futures and Organizational Change. Shri Ram Centre for Industrial Relations and Human Resources.
- Aiyangar, S. Krishnaswami (1991) [1921]. South India and Her Muhammadan Invaders. Asian Educational Services, Oxford University Press. ISBN 978-81-206-0536-7. Archived from the original on 22 November 2020.
- Amaladass, Anand (1988). Jesuit Presence in Indian History. Gujarat Sahitya Prakash. Archived from the original on 27 November 2020.
- Amarnath, Nischinta; Ghosh, Debashish (2005). The Voyage to Excellence: The Ascent of 21 Women Leaders of India Inc. Pustak Mahal. ISBN 978-81-223-0904-1. Archived from the original on 3 January 2014.
- Annesley, James (1841). "Climate of Trichinopoly". Researches into the causes, nature, and treatment of the more prevalent diseases of India. London: Longman, Brown, Green, and Longmans.
- Asher, Frederick M. (2003). Art of India: Prehistory to the Present. Encyclopædia Britannica.
- Ayyangar, C. R. Sreenivasa (1908). "18". Life and teachings of Sri Ramanujacharya. R. Venkateshwar.
- Ayyar, P. V. Jagadisa (1920). South Indian Shrines. Madras Times Printing and Pub. Co.
- Ayyar, P. V. Jagadisa (1991). South Indian shrines: illustrated. Asian Educational Services. ISBN 81-206-0151-3.
- Bala, Raj (1 January 1986). Trends in Urbanisation in India, 1901–1981. Rawat Publications. ISBN 978-81-7033-012-7. Archived from the original on 3 January 2014.
- Baliga, B. S. (1999). Madras District Gazetteers: Tiruchirappalli (pts. 1–2). Superintendent, Govt. Press.
- Bayly, Susan (2004). Saints, Goddesses and Kings: Muslims and Christians in South Indian Society, 1700–1900. Cambridge University Press. ISBN 978-0-521-89103-5. Archived from the original on 3 January 2014.
- Beck, Elisabeth (2006). Pallava Rock Architecture And Sculpture. Sri Aurobindo Institute of Research in Social Sciences, East West Books (India) Limited. ISBN 978-81-88661-46-6.
- Benn's press directory. Vol. 2. Benn's Publications Limited. 1978.
- Bhandari, Laveesh (2009). Indian states at a glance, 2008–09: Tamil Nadu : performance, facts and figures. Pearson Education. ISBN 978-81-317-2347-0.
- Bhatt, S. C. (1994). Satellite invasion of India. Gyan Books. ISBN 978-81-212-0483-5.
- Bradnock, Robert W. (1994). South Asian Handbook. Trade & Travel Publications. ISBN 9780844299808. Archived from the original on 17 June 2014.
- Brayley-Hodgetts, Jim (2008). Madras Matters. Lulu.com. ISBN 978-1-4357-0887-7. Archived from the original on 19 October 2021.
- Brown, Percy (1968). Indian Architecture. Vol. 1. D. B. Taraporevala.
- Burn, R.; Cotton, J. S. (1908). Imperial Gazetteer of India. Vol. 24. Clarendon Press.
- Caldwell, Robert (1881). A Political and General History of the District of Tinnevelly, in the Presidency of Madras: From the Earliest Period to Its Cession to the English Government in A.D. 1801. E. Keys, at the Government Press.
- Caplan, Lionel (2003). Children of Colonialism: Anglo-Indians in a Postcolonial World. Berg Publishers. ISBN 978-1-85973-632-6.
- Census Commissioner (1941). Census of India, 1941: Vol 2. Government of India.
- Chand, Attar (1987). The Great Humanist Ramaswami Venkataraman. Gyan Books. ISBN 978-81-212-0106-3. Archived from the original on 13 December 2013.
- Chhabra, G. S. (2005). Advance Study in the History of Modern India (Volume-1: 1707–1803). Lotus Press. ISBN 978-81-89093-06-8. Archived from the original on 3 January 2014.
- Commonwealth universities yearbook. Vol. 1. Association of Commonwealth Universities. 2003.
- Datta, Amaresh (1987). Encyclopaedia of Indian Literature: A-Devo. Sahitya Akademi. ISBN 978-81-260-1803-1.
- de Bruyn, Pippa de; Venkatraman, Niloufer; Bain, Keith (2006). Frommer's India. John Wiley & Sons. p. 243. ISBN 978-0-471-79434-9.
- de Bruyn, Pippa; Bain, Keith; Venkatraman, Niloufer; Joshi, Shonar (2008). Frommer's India. John Wiley & Sons. ISBN 9780470169087. Archived from the original on 31 December 2013.
- de Bruyn, Pippa de; Bain, Keith; Allardice, David (2010). Frommer's India. Frommer's. ISBN 978-0-470-55610-8.
- Deefholts, Glenn; Acharya, Quentine (2006). The way we were: Anglo-Indian chronicles. Calcutta Tiljallah Relief Inc. ISBN 978-0-9754639-3-2.
- Environmental health. Vol. 13. Central Public Health Engineering Research Institute. 1991.
- The Feudatory and zemindari India. Vol. 13–14. 1933.
- Fortescue, Sir John William (1902). A History of the British Army. Macmillan. Archived from the original on 7 November 2020.
- Gangoly, Ordhendra Cooman (1978). South Indian bronzes. Nababharat Publishers.
- Gupta, Ameeta; Kumar, Ashish (2006). Handbook of universities. Atlantic Publishers & Distributors. ISBN 978-81-269-0607-9.
- Handbook of Universities. Atlantic Publishers & Dist. 2006. ISBN 978-81-269-0608-6. Archived from the original on 11 December 2013.
- Hemingway, Frederick Ricketts (1907). Madras District Gazetteers: Trichinopoly. Vol. 1. Government Press. Archived from the original on 2 May 2014.
- Herbermann, Charles George; Pace, Edward Aloysius; Pallen, Condé Bénoist; Shahan, Thomas Joseph; Wynn, John Joseph (1913). The Catholic encyclopedia: an international work of reference on the constitution, doctrine, discipline, and history of the Catholic Church. Vol. 15. Encyclopedia Press.
- Hill, Christopher V. (2008). South Asia: An Environmental History. ABC-CLIO. ISBN 978-1-85109-925-2.
- Hope, Elizabeth; Digby, William (1900). General Sir Arthur Cotton, his life and work. Hodder & Stoughton.
- Illustrated Guide to the South Indian Railway. Higginbotham's. 1900.
- Illustrated Guide to the South Indian Railway (Incorporated in England): Including the Tanjore District Board, Pondicherry, Peralam-Karaikkal, Travancore State, Cochin State, Coimbatore District Board, Tinnevelly-Tiruchendur, and the Nilgiri Railways. Asian Educational Services. 2004 [1926]. ISBN 978-81-206-1889-3. Archived from the original on 13 October 2020.
- The Illustrated Weekly of India. 1986. Archived from the original on 31 December 2013.
- India. Director of Census Operations, Tamil Nadu (1994). Census of India, 1991: Tamil Nadu. Controller of Publications. Archived from the original on 23 October 2020.
- India and Indonesia During the Ancient Regime: Essays. Brill Publishers. 1989. ISBN 978-90-04-08363-9. Archived from the original on 13 December 2013.
- The Indian year book. Vol. 26. Bennett, Coleman & Co. 1939.
- Ingram, Edward (1995). Empire-building and Empire-builders: Twelve Studies. Psychology Press. ISBN 978-0-7146-4612-1.
- Jaques, Tony (2007). Dictionary of Battles and Sieges. Vol. 3. Greenwood Publishing Group. ISBN 978-0-313-33536-5.
- Handbook for India, Burma, and Ceylon. John Murray. 1920. Archived from the original on 4 January 2014.
- Kenkyūjo, Nōki Sangyō Chōsa (2004). Agricultural mechanization in Asia, Africa and Latin America: AMA. Vol. 35–37. Farm Machinery Industrial Research Corp.
- Kuppuram, G. (1988). India through the Ages. Vol. 1. Sundeep Prakashan.
- Lal, Kishori Saran (1967). History of the Khaljis A. D. 1290–1320. Asia Publishing House.
- Limca Book of Records. Bisleri Beverages Limited. 1999. Archived from the original on 12 December 2013.
- Lok Sabha debates. Lok Sabha Secretariat. 1998.
- Lok Sabha debates. Lok Sabha Secretariat. 2007.
- Ludden, David E. (2004). Capitalism in Asia. Association for Asian Studies. ISBN 978-0-924304-45-3.
- Luthra, H. R. (1986). Indian broadcasting. Publications Division, Ministry of Information and Broadcasting.
- Madras District Gazetteers: Tiruchirappalli (pt. 1–2). Superintendent, Government Press. 1998.
- Maheshwari, R. C.; Chaturvedi, Pradeep (1997). Bio-energy for rural energisation: proceedings of the National Bio-Energy Convention-95 on Bio-Energy for Rural engergisation, organised by Bio-Energy Society of India, during December 4–15, 1995 at I.I.T. New Delhi. Concept Publishing Company. ISBN 978-81-7022-670-3.
- Manorama Yearbook 2007. Malayala Manorama. 2007.
- Manufacture of Narcotic Drugs, Psychotropic Substances and Their Precursors. United Nations Publications. 2010. ISBN 978-92-1-048082-6.
- Markovits, Claude (2004). A History of Modern India, 1480–1950. Anthem Press. ISBN 978-1-84331-152-2.
- Memoirs of the Geological Survey of India. Vol. 4. Geological Survey of India. 1865.
- Menon, Indira (2013). Rhythms in stone, The Temples of South India. Ambi Knowledge Resource. ISBN 978-81-903591-3-9. Archived from the original on 3 January 2014.
- Mittal, Sushil; Thursby, Gene (2012). Hindu World. Routledge. ISBN 978-1-134-60875-1. Archived from the original on 12 December 2013.
- Moore, Lewis (1878). A Manual of the Trichinopoly District in the Presidency of Madras. Government Press.
- Muthanna, I. M. (1962). History of Karnataka: History, Administration & Culture. Usha Press.
- Muthiah, S. (2004). Madras Rediscovered. East West Books (Madras) Pvt Ltd. ISBN 81-88661-24-4.
- Muthiah, S. (2008). Madras, Chennai: A 400-year Record of the First City of Modern India. Palaniappa Brothers. ISBN 978-81-8379-468-8. Archived from the original on 26 May 2016.
- Nagaswamy, R. (1982). Tantric cult of South India. Agam Kala Prakashan.
- Nicholson, Louis (1985). India in luxury. Century. ISBN 978-0-7126-0857-2.
- Palanithurai, Ganapathy (2007). A handbook for panchayati raj administration (Tamil Nadu). Concept Publishing Company. ISBN 978-81-8069-340-3.
- Paranjape, Makarand R. (2009). Altered Destinations: Self, Society, and Nation in India. Anthem Press. ISBN 978-1-84331-797-5.
- Playne, Somerset; Bond, J. W.; Wright, Arnold (2004) [1914]. Southern India: Its History, People, Commerce, and Industrial Resources. Asian Educational Services. ISBN 9788120613447.
- Pujari, R. M.; Kolhe, Pradeep; Kumar, N. R. (2006). Pride of India: A Glimpse into India's scientific heritage. Samskrita Bharathi. ISBN 978-81-87276-27-2.
- Qādirī, Abdullāh Valī Bak̲h̲sh; Siddiqui, Mohd. Akhtar (1998). Education and Muslims in India since Independence. Institute of Objective Studies. ISBN 978-81-85220-52-9.
- Radhakrishnan, P. (2008). Cad/cam/cim. New Age International. ISBN 978-81-224-1248-2.
- Rajagopalan, N. (1992). Another Garland: Biographical Dictionary of Carnatic Composers & Musicians, Book II. Carnatic Classicals.
- Rajendran, S.; Arumugam, M.; Chandrasekaran, V. A. (19–26 April 2002). Potential Use of High Resolution IRS 1-C Satellite Data and Deletion of Urban Growth in and around of Tiruchirapalli city (PDF). FIG XXII International Congress. Washington, DC: Federation Internationale des Geometres. Archived (PDF) from the original on 30 December 2019.
- Ramachandran, D. P. (2008). Empire's First Soldiers. Lancer Publishers. ISBN 978-0-9796174-7-8. Archived from the original on 12 January 2014.
- Ramakrishnan, P. (2007). Powder metallurgy: processing for automotive, electrical/electronic and engineering industry; [International Conference on Powder Metallurgy for Automotive and Engineering Industry ... at the Renaissance Mumbai Hotel and Convention Centre during Feb. 3 – 6, 2005]. New Age International. ISBN 978-81-224-2030-2.
- Ramappa, M.; Singh, Sudershan (1984). Directory of Telugu associations outside Andhra Pradesh. International Telugu Institute.
- Ramaswami, N. S. (1984). Political history of Carnatic under the Nawabs. Abhinav Publications. ISBN 978-0-8364-1262-8.
- Ramaswamy, Vijaya (2007). Historical Dictionary of the Tamils. Scarecrow Press. ISBN 978-0-8108-6445-0. Archived from the original on 31 December 2013.
- Rana, Mahendra Singh (1 January 2006). India Votes: Lok Sabha & Vidhan Sabha Elections 2001–2005. Sarup & Sons. ISBN 978-81-7625-647-6.
- Ranking, J. L. (2010) [1867]. Report upon the military and civil station of Trichinopoly. Nabu Press. ISBN 978-1-148-17268-2.
- Rao, M. S. A. (1974). Urban Sociology in India. Orient Blackswan. ISBN 978-0-86125-296-1.
- Rasam, Vasanti Pratapchandra (1997). Swatantra Party: a political biography. Dattsons. ISBN 978-81-7192-033-4.
- Rural Urban Relationship Committee, India (1966). Report. Vol. 3. Government of India, Ministry of Health & Family Planning.
- Government Press (1877). Report on the Administration of the Madras Presidency During the Year 1875–76. Archived from the original on 22 November 2020.
- Rose, John Holland; Newton, Arthur Percival (1929). Dodwell, Henry H. (ed.). The Cambridge History of the British Empire. CUP Archive. GGKEY:55QQ9L73P70. Archived from the original on 9 June 2014.
- Sajnani, Manohar (2001). Encyclopedia of tourism resources in India, Volume 2. Kalpaz Publications. ISBN 81-7835-014-9.
- Sastri, K. A. Nilakanta (1935). The Cōlas. University of Madras.
- Sathianathaier, R. (1924). History of the Nāyaks of Madura. Oxford University Press.
- Sen, Ajoy Kumar (1991). Tourism in India. Modern Book Agency.
- Sewell, Robert (2011) [1900]. A Forgotten Empire (Vijayanagar). London: Swan Sonnenschein & Co. ISBN 9788120601253.
- Sharma, Pradeep (2000). Human Geography: The Land. Discovery Publishing House. ISBN 978-81-8356-290-4.
- "SLB Results Workshop" (PDF). Ministry of Urban Development, Government of India. 14–15 December 2009. Archived from the original (PDF) on 2 October 2011.
- The Small Hands of Slavery: Bonded Child Labor in India. Human Rights Watch. 1996. ISBN 978-1-56432-172-5. Archived from the original on 3 January 2014.
- "South Indian Railway Strike". Labour Monthly. 10 (6). Communist Party of Great Britain. October 1928. Archived from the original on 20 June 2013.
- Srinivasan (2009). "Bharat Heavy Electricals Limited". Case Studies in Marketing: The Indian Context 4Th Ed. PHI Learning Pvt. Ltd. ISBN 978-81-203-3543-1.
- Stanley, Selwyn (2004). Social Problems in India. Allied Publishers. ISBN 978-81-7764-708-2.
- Steever, Sanford B. (2003). The Dravidian Languages. Taylor & Francis. ISBN 978-0-415-10023-6.
- Subrahmanian, N. (1977). History of Tamilnad. Vol. 2. Koodal Publishers.
- Subramaniam, Kuppu (1974). Brahmin priest of Tamil Nadu. Wiley Eastern. ISBN 978-0-85226-848-3.
- Subramanian, K. R. (1928). The Maratha Rajas of Tanjore. Madras: K. R. Subramanian.
- Sundararaj, T. (1981). "A Historical Sketch of Trichinopoly Rock Fort". Journal of Indian History. 59. Dept. of Modern Indian History: 117–128.
- Superintendent Census Operations (1966). "Madras". Census of India, 1961. 9 (1). Government of India.
- Thani Nayagam, Xavier S. (1957). Tamil Culture. Vol. 6. Academy of Tamil culture.
- Thurston, Edgar (1913). Provincial Geographies of India Vol 4: The Madras Presidency with Mysore, Coorg and Associated States. Cambridge University.
- Untracht, Oppi (1997). Traditional Jewelry of India. Harry N. Abrams, Inc. ISBN 978-0-8109-3886-1.
- Urwick, William (1881). Indian Pictures. The Religious Tract Society.
- Westrip, Joyce; Holroyde, Peggy (2010). Colonial Cousins: A Surprising History of Connections Between India and Australia. Wakefield Press. ISBN 978-1-86254-841-1.
- Wireless world. Vol. 53. 1947.
- Yule, Sir Henry; Burnell, Arthur Coke (1903). "Trichinopoly". Hobson-Jobson: A glossary of colloquial Anglo-Indian words and phrases. J. Murray.
- Yunus, Mohammad; Parmar, Aradhana (2003). South Asia: a historical narrative. Oxford University Press. ISBN 978-0-19-579711-4.
- Zaidi, A. Moin (1973). The way out to freedom: an inquiry into the Quit India Movement conducted by participants. Orientalia (India). ISBN 9780883862179.
- Thirugnanam, Ko. (2014). 108 Divya Desangalin Purana Kathaiyudan Varaipadangal [The Historical Stories of 108 Divya Desam Temples with Drawings] (in Tamil). T. Rajarajeswari. p. 22.
