= Railway surgery =

Late 19th century surgery in railcars

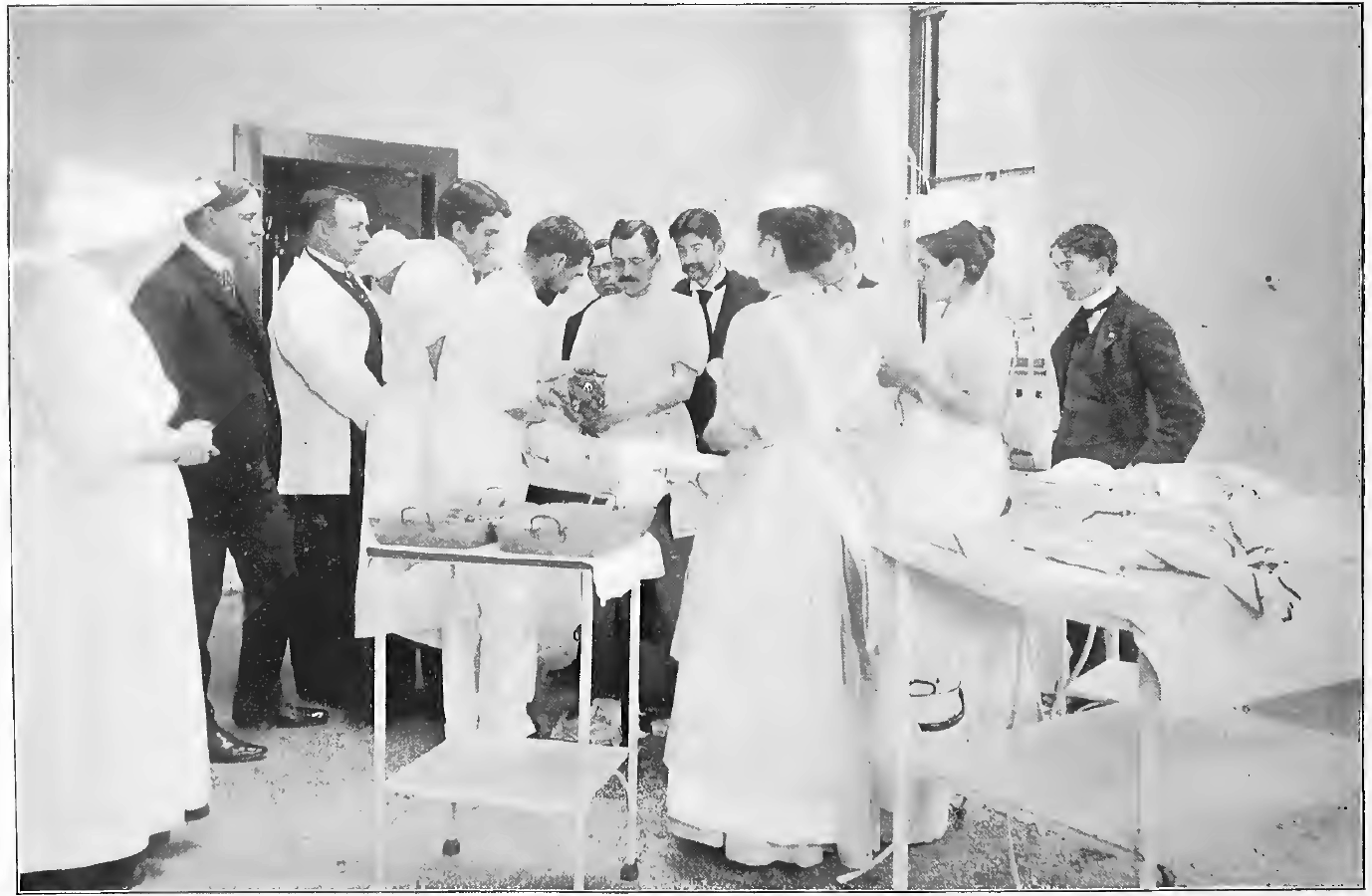
Amputation of the thigh by a railway surgery team c. 1898

Railway surgery was a branch of medical practice that flourished in the 19th and early 20th centuries. It concerned itself with the medical requirements of railway companies. Depending on country, it included some or all of: general practice for railway staff, trauma surgery as a result of accidents on the railways, occupational health and safety, medico-legal activities regarding compensation claims against the company, and occupational testing.

Railway surgery was especially well developed in the US, with formal professional organisations and scholarly journals. One of the reasons for this was that US railways were particularly dangerous, with a high number of casualties from crashes and an even higher number of workers hurt in industrial accidents. Another reason was that many US routes passed through areas with little or no existing medical infrastructure. In Europe the railways were safer and infrastructure was generally already in place. The duties of railway surgeons in Europe mostly involved investigations into accidents and the resulting claims arising from passengers. In India the railways also faced a lack of existing medical infrastructure and, like the US, had to build it from scratch. Indian Railways still maintains a network of hospitals.

By the middle of the 20th century, railway surgery had lost its separate identity. The growth of other industries and improving rail safety meant that the railways no longer stood out as a leading cause of injuries. Likewise, industrial medicine and health and safety became a concern for all industries. There was no longer a need for an industry-specific branch of medicine.

== Function ==
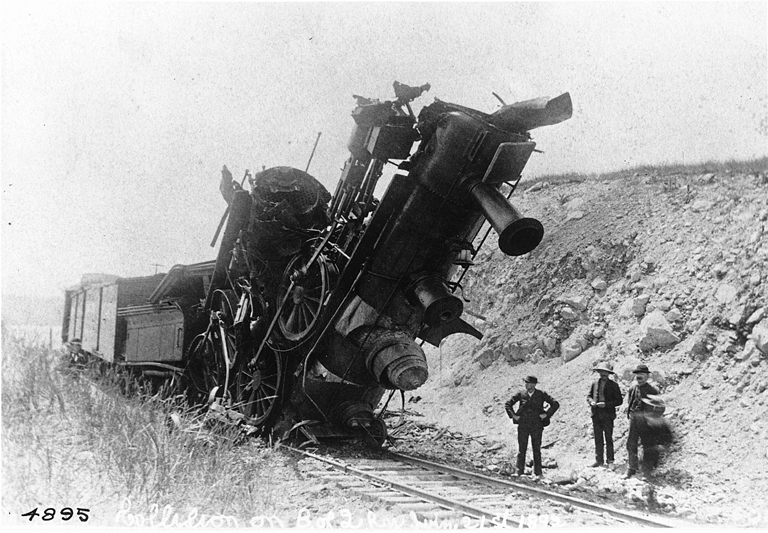
Head on collision on the Bay of Quinte Railway, 1892

The primary purpose of railway surgeons was to attend to the many injuries of staff and passengers on the railways. Railway surgeons were also responsible for assessing medical claims against their companies and providing routine medical examinations of employees and applicants. Railway surgeons were keen to establish their profession as a separate discipline with unique problems. For instance, the textbook Railway Surgery, published in 1899, spends a whole chapter on the claim that crushing injuries from the heavy moving equipment on railways are of a kind not found in other industries.

Railway surgeons were generally not well paid. While a chief surgeon or consultant surgeon might attract a good salary, the ordinary doctors working out on the lines were not well rewarded.

=== Traumatic injuries ===
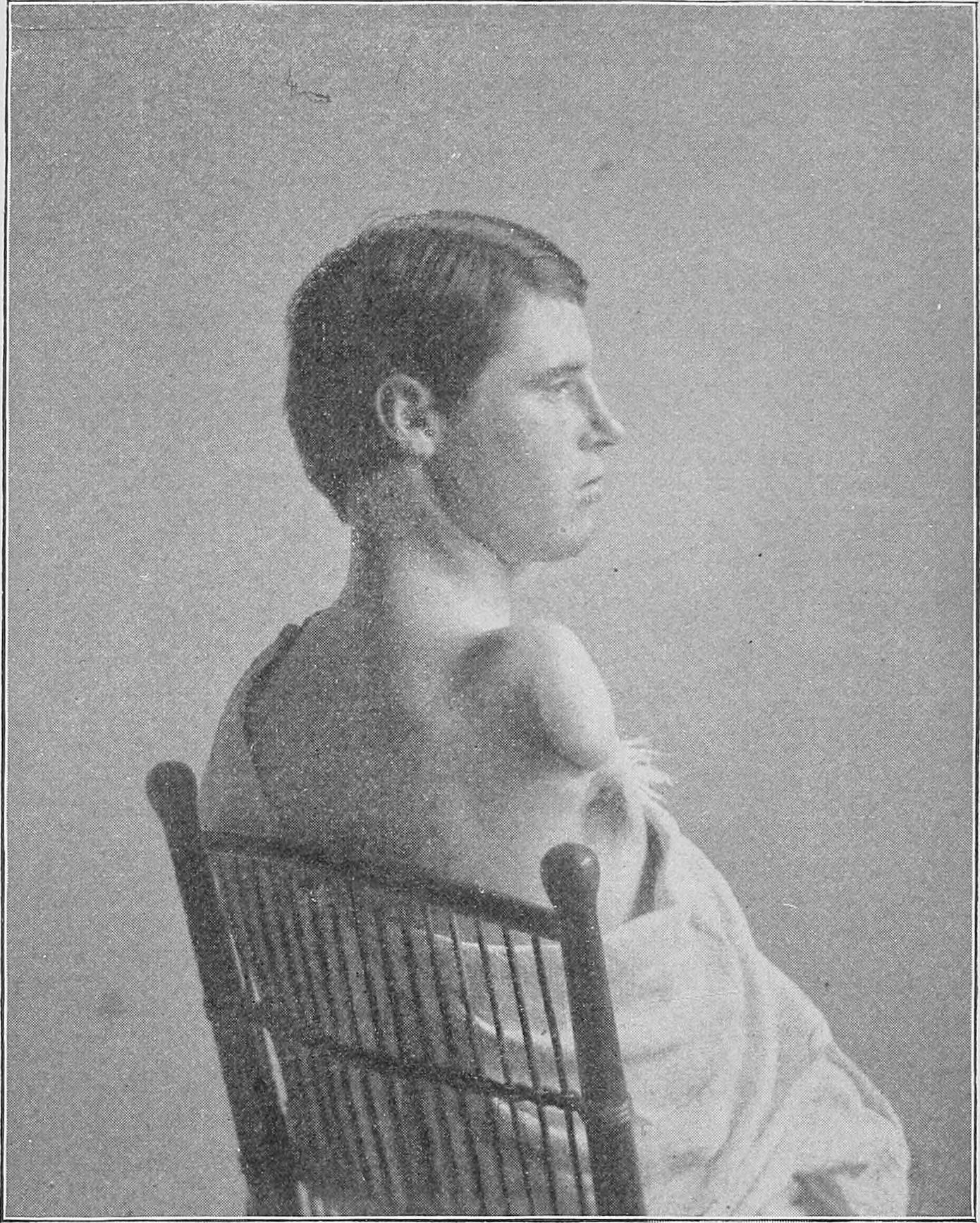
Amputation at the shoulder from the textbook Railway Surgery

Rail crashes were common in the 19th century with many deaths and broken bones. In Europe, the majority of injuries were due to collisions, hence passengers rather than employees formed the bulk of the injured. For instance, in Britain, accidents on the line such as crushing between wagons and being struck by trains (accidents suffered mostly by railway staff) were far fewer than passenger injuries through collisions in 1887. In the US, the railways were significantly more dangerous. Counterintuitively, this led to staff injuries being by far the greatest proportion. In 1892, US railroads reported 28,000 injuries to workers compared to 3,200 for passengers. The most dangerous role was brakeman, whose job included coupling and uncoupling wagons. The most frequent injury was the brakeman being crushed between wagons while carrying out this task. One third of all railway injuries to staff were crushed hands or fingers.

The number of deaths and injuries grew rapidly as the century progressed. In the US, the first death occurred in 1831. There were 234 deaths in 1853, the year in which there were eleven major crashes. In 1890, there were 6,335 deaths and 35,362 injuries, and by 1907 it had reached its peak at nearly 12,000 deaths. In England, an early railway death was William Huskisson, Member of Parliament for Liverpool, killed during the opening of the Liverpool and Manchester Railway in 1830. In the UK as a whole, deaths and injuries grew much less dramatically than the US. There were 338 passenger deaths and injuries in 1855 and 435 in 1863, but at the same time passenger numbers were increasing. From about the middle of this period the rate of injury started to go down with improving safety—2.85 per million passengers in 1855 to 2.12 in 1863. A similar picture of low rates pertained in other European countries such as France, Prussia, Belgium and Germany.

Many injuries required amputation. For instance, in 1880 the Baltimore and Ohio Railroad reported 184 crushed limbs, including 85 fractures and fifteen amputations. The need to perform amputations and other surgery may be why railway surgeons were named surgeon rather than doctor or physician. While traumatic injuries were not the most frequent ailment they had to deal with (that was infectious diseases) it did distinguish them from typical general practitioners. Other influences may have been the comparison to ship's surgeons in the age of sail, and the greater status and pay of surgeons.

First aid kits and training were introduced at the instigation of Charles Dickson of the Canadian St. John Ambulance Association and backed by many railway surgeons. One railway surgeon reported that his fatality rate following amputation more than halved after first aid was introduced. There was some opposition to first aid through fear that it eroded the professional status of doctors and that local contract railway surgeons would lose the fees they would otherwise have accrued for the work. However, by World War I first aid kits on trains had become widespread.

As the twentieth century progressed, rail safety improved dramatically. So much so that by 1956 the president of the Association of Surgeons of the Chesapeake and Ohio Railway, when asked if he saw a lot of accident cases at the company hospital, could reply "yes, I see a lot of accidents from the highway" and "[t]he primary purpose of our group has all but passed out of the picture." The discipline of railway surgery had been folded into the more general discipline of trauma surgery.

=== Railway spine ===
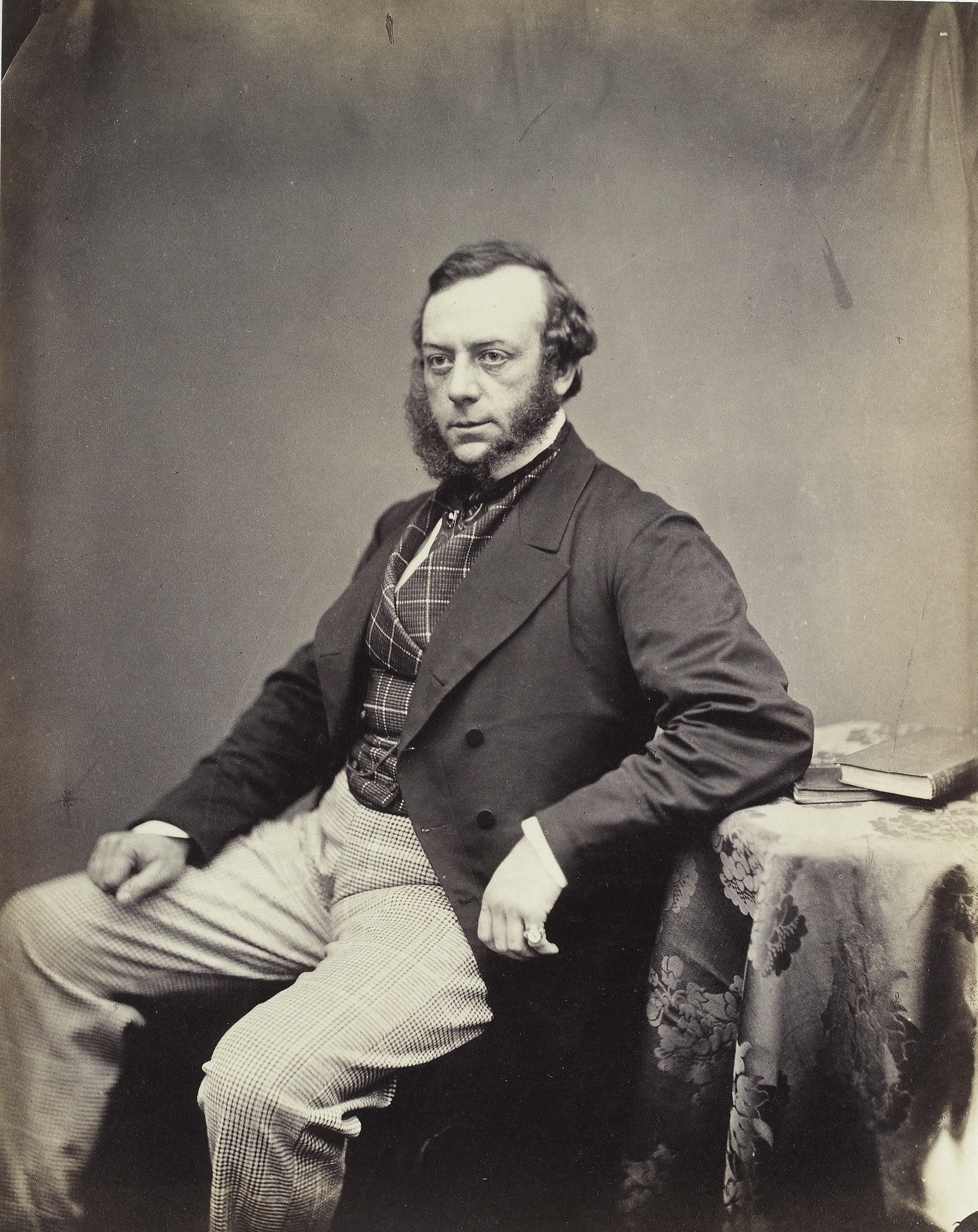
John Eric Erichson

An important function of railway surgeons was to control the costs of claims against their companies, leading to conflicts of interest regarding treatment of their patients. For instance, the chief surgeon of the Missouri Pacific Railroad proudly boasted that he kept claims in the region of 14–35 dollars whereas claims against another railroad were nearly 600 dollars on average. Company medical staff were also expected to help achieve political aims with expert evidence. In some cases chief surgeons were appointed purely on the basis of their relationship to important politicians.

Fraudulent claims were a big concern for railway companies. Sometimes, these were entirely contrived "accidents" by confidence tricksters; more commonly, however, they were exaggerations of the results of a genuine accident. In 1906, railway surgeon Willis King claimed that 96% of claimants were actually malingering. One common claim that was hotly debated by railway surgeons was the condition known as railway spine. Over a hundred papers were published on the subject in the medical literature for the period 1866–1890. In this condition, the patient reports cerebral symptoms such as headache or loss of memory, but there is no visible damage to the spine. It was first described by Danish-British surgeon John Eric Erichsen. Erichsen believed the condition was physiological, due to inflammation of the spinal cord. He compared it to meningitis which had similar symptoms and a similar cause. Others, such as Herbert W. Page (surgeon to the London and North Western Railway), argued that it was psychological, or else, like Arthur Dean Bevan (1918 president of the American Medical Association), outright faked. Railway surgeons were generally skeptical of the condition and disliked the implication that there was an injury peculiar to railways. British surgeon Edwin Morris described the term as "most reprehensible". Bevan claimed to have cured one patient in ten minutes by standing him up and speaking to him forcefully.

In Britain, a number of major train crashes led to parliament passing an act which compelled rail companies to pay compensation to victims of accidents. A large proportion of the thousands of resulting claims were for railway spine. In a five-year period in the 1870s English railway companies paid £2.2 million ($11 million) in claims for railway spine. Following a similar law in Germany, 78% of claims in the period 1871–1879 were for back injury. Claims for railway spine had subsided by 1900. From 1890 there were more claims for psychosomatic conditions such as hysteria and the neurasthenia of George Miller Beard rather than physiological conditions such as railway spine. Even Erichsen himself agreed that his original cases were actually traumatic neurasthenia. However, medical concern remained over these emotional damage claims regarding malingering and false claims.

=== Health and safety ===
Railway companies pioneered the disciplines of industrial medicine and occupational safety and health. They were the first organisations to give physical examinations to prospective employees. The motivation was partly to prevent fraudulent claims for pre-existing conditions, but also to improve rail safety. The Baltimore and Ohio Railroad in 1884 was the first to do this and had a particularly thorough examination. They rejected 7% of applicants. Colour blindness tests were introduced for all employees in most US railway companies in the 1880s because of the need for correct signal recognition. Hearing tests were also implemented.

Colour blindness tests were a result of the 1875 Lagerlunda rail accident in Sweden. The accident was investigated by Frithiof Holmgren who concluded that the crash was a result of colour blindness of the driver. Holmgren created a test for use in the transportation industry based on matching coloured skeins of yarn. However, Holmgren's test was disliked by employees and there were many complaints of unfairness. Many companies preferred to test with lamps and flags, but this led to conflict with the railway surgeons who were concerned that non-professionals were administering medical tests. Holmgren's identification of colour blindness as the cause of the Swedish crash has also been disputed.

Railway companies increasingly improved the health of their employees with preventative measures against disease. Vaccination schemes were introduced. Sanitation aboard trains became an issue, as did the quality of water supplies. In the 1920s the Cotton Belt Railroad succeeded in cutting hospitalization due to malaria of its workers from 21.5% to 0.2%. They did this with a program that included suppressing mosquito populations, preventative quinine treatment, education, and blood tests.

== World view ==
Railway surgery was particularly well-developed in the US in the nineteenth and early-twentieth centuries. Early American railroads passed through vast, thinly populated regions with little possibility of finding local medical care. At the same time American railways were uniquely dangerous. Accident rates were far higher than European railways. That, together with difficulty in retaining skilled staff and the risk of legal action by injured passengers resulted in American railway companies developing medical infrastructure and organisations to a degree that was not seen elsewhere.

The difference in risk between the US and Europe was largely driven by economics. With their higher population densities and shorter routes, European countries carried more freight per mile of track than in the US. To be profitable, American railways needed to be built and run more cheaply. This led to a host of safety issues. American railways were poorly signalled compared to British railways; in the US there were no signal boxes, instead signalling was largely the responsibility of staff on board trains. Rails were laid on thin beds and badly secured leading to many derailments. Most tracks in Europe were double tracks whereas in the US they were usually single track. Poor control of single-track rails led to many collisions. There was no fencing on American tracks, leading to many collisions with people and animals.

Certainly, railway companies in other countries had railway surgeons. In Australia and Canada railway surgeons were appointed during the construction of major lines in remote regions. British companies employed railway surgeons as consultants. However, only in the US were railway surgeons employed in such large numbers and as such an organised discipline. India is perhaps the closest to the US in widespread use of railway surgeons which continues to this day, but there they never seem to have organised themselves as a discipline with professional associations until the 2000s.

== United States ==
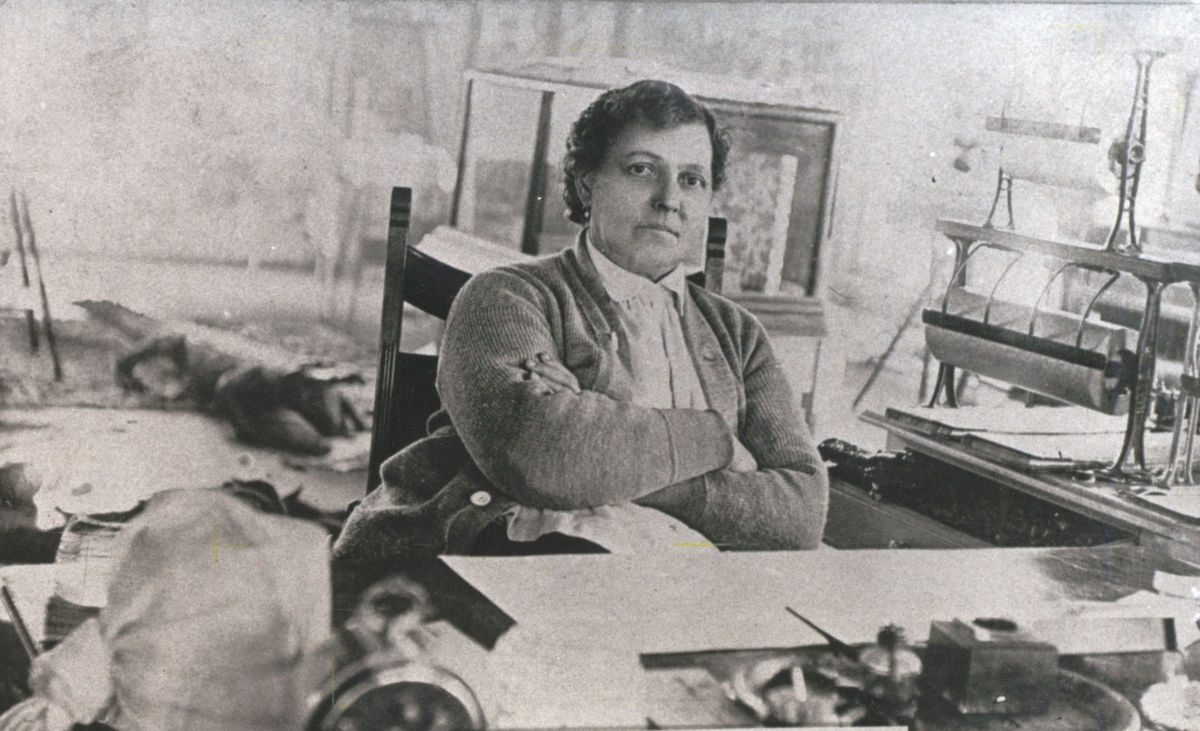
Sofie Herzog, the only female railway surgeon ever appointed in the US

Construction of railways in the US began in 1828, becoming significant by 1840. By 1900 the railways were the largest US industry employing over a million, far more than any other dangerous occupation. Many thousands of injuries occurred on these railroads throughout the 19th century. From 1850 until World War I, American railroad companies developed their own medical arrangements in order to retain workers, care for their passengers and injured third parties, and avoid legal action. The earliest example of a company railroad surgeon was James P. Quinn on the Baltimore and Ohio Railroad in 1834, but the practice did not become widespread until the 1850s. By the end of the 1850s most companies had some kind of medical service.

Legal claims for compensation in the nineteenth century under tort laws were weaker than under twentieth century compensation laws. Railroad workers (the majority of injuries) were not usually able to claim. Nor were trespassers on railway property. Passengers, however, were able to claim, but payments were low and few victims got anything compared to modern standards. Nevertheless, the large number of crashes still led to a substantial number of legal actions.

These organisations pioneered industrial medical care and predated the provision of medical care in manufacturing industries (although some mining companies did so). Railway surgery was an important sector of the medical profession; by World War I railway organisations employed 14,000 doctors, some 10% of the US total. Railway surgery operated outside of the American Medical Association (AMA) which railway surgeons were not permitted to join. Many in the medical profession opposed company doctors altogether on the grounds of ethical conflict between the needs of the patient and the needs of the company. The AMA also disliked the practice of doctors bidding for local contracts with the railway companies as this also introduced commercial pressures.

Early medical arrangements on the railroads were informal. The Philadelphia & Reading Railroad in particular had no formal contracts as late as the 1870s. This led to many disputes over payment. By the 1880s, however, all railroads had more formal arrangements. They appointed a salaried chief surgeon and the larger ones had salaried regional surgeons as well. Local doctors were paid according to fixed fees under contract. In the West, the lack of existing medical facilities led to employee-funded hospitals. The first of these was set up by the Central Pacific Railroad around 1867 and modelled on the US Marine Hospital Service. It was funded by a fixed deduction from all employees, except Chinese employees, who were excluded from the service. A different kind of arrangement was the mutual benefit society. The first of these was set up by the Baltimore & Ohio Railroad in 1880 following the Great Railroad Strike of 1877. Other railroads started to follow this model, partly because of its effect of dampening industrial strife. By World War I about 30% (around two million) of railroad workers were members.

By 1896 there were twenty-five railway hospitals run by thirteen different railway companies. Between them they treated 165,000 patients annually. Some of these hospitals became important teaching hospitals and generally they were all well financed and well equipped.

After World War I railway surgery began to decline as a separate discipline. It lost its political influence in the 1930s during the Great Depression as industry, including the railroads, reduced their involvement in health care for their workers. At the same time accident risks were steadily falling. Between 1890 and 1940 risks for passengers and workers fell by 90% and 80% respectively.

== Great Britain ==
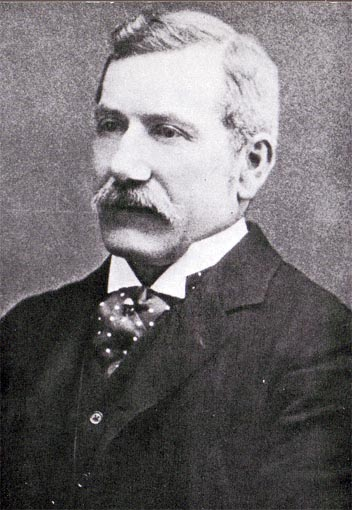
Thomas Bond, railway surgeon to the Great Western Railway

The first inter-city railway passenger service in the world was the Liverpool and Manchester Railway, opened in 1830. By 1860, the UK had 10,000 miles of track and employed 180,000 people. Despite being the pioneer, British railways (and European railways in general) were much safer than American lines and consequently had fewer injuries, although early injury rates were still high by modern standards. Furthermore, British lines did not pass through vast, thinly populated regions. Medical infrastructure was already well developed in the country. Railway companies still employed surgeons. Page at the London and North Western has already been mentioned. Another example is Thomas Bond who was retained as surgeon by both the Great Eastern and Great Western Railways. However, Bond's function for the railways was primarily as medico-legal consultant regarding injury claims rather than practical surgery. He did, however, treat the injured of an overturned train on which he was himself a passenger. Bond's last major work for the railways was investigations in connection with the Slough rail accident of 1900. Bond also wrote a lengthy article on railway injuries for Heath's Dictionary of Practical Surgery. There is a similar picture with James O. Fletcher, surgeon to the Manchester, Sheffield and Lincolnshire and Great Northern Railways, who wrote the book Railways in Their Medical Aspects. Fletcher's book discusses numerous cases where he examined or treated patients post-surgery and discusses medico-legal issues at length. However, he does not cite a single example of his own, or railway colleagues', emergency surgery.

The first dedicated accident and emergency (A&E) service in Britain was associated with the building of the Manchester Ship Canal, 1887–1894, rather than railways. However, the civil engineer in charge, Thomas A. Walker, had a background in railway construction around the world, particularly in Canada where he had experience of employing British navvies. He was also responsible for construction of the District Railway in London. Walker predicted, correctly, that there would be a high incidence of accidents during the canal construction. He had a chain of A&E hospitals and first aid stations built and staffed along the route to service the 17,000 workers. These were linked to the construction sites by purpose built railways. The service was financed by compulsory worker contributions. In total, there were 3,000 injuries and 130 deaths during construction.

== India ==
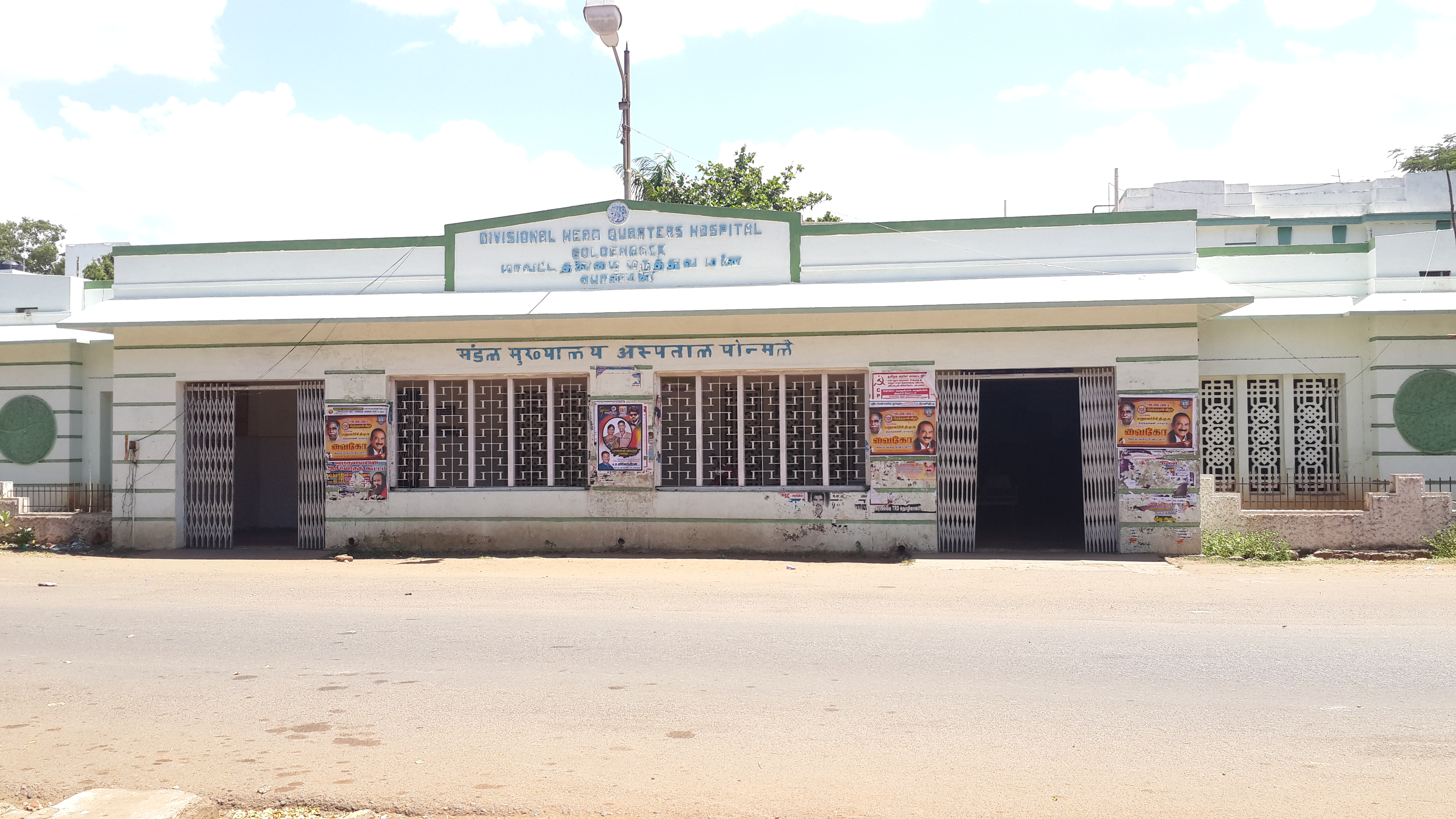
Divisional railway hospital, Golden Rock, Tiruchirappalli, Tamil Nadu

Railways in India began to be built during the British India period. The first passenger service opened between Mumbai and Thane in 1853. As in many parts of the US, there was no pre-existing medical infrastructure. Medical facilities had to be entirely provided by the railways themselves. This, along with other social needs, led to the establishment of railway "colonies" to house the railway workers and their families. For instance, the railway colony of Jamalpur was established in 1862. By 1869, one railway surgeon and four assistants were employed at Jamalpur by the East Indian Railway Company to cover the 800 inhabitants of the colony and over 200 miles of railway line. This section had around 200 accidents per year to deal with but that was not their only duty. They also acted as general practitioners for the colony, including attending at childbirth.

By 1956, the railways had established 80 hospitals and 426 dispensaries. Additionally, mobile railway surgeons served railway staff posted along the line. This infrastructure of railway colonies, medical staff, and hospitals is still maintained by the railways. A major example of a railway colony is the colony at Kharagpur, West Bengal, established 1898–1900. It serves one of the largest railway workshops in India. A major example of a railway hospital is the Southern Railway Headquarters Hospital at Chennai. Southern Railway also maintain divisional hospitals such as the Divisional Railway Hospital, Golden Rock as do the other zones of Indian Railways.

== Hospital train ==
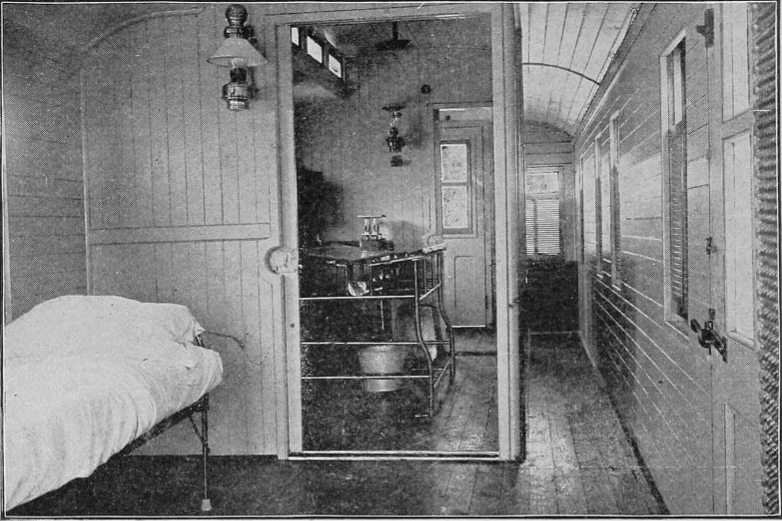
A hospital car belonging to Plant System in Florida, view looking into the operating theatre

Hospital trains were in use early in the railway age, but usually in wartime, starting in the Crimean War in 1855. For normal civilian use, they were a fairly late development in the railway surgery period. In the US, a hospital car came into use on several railways that could be coupled to a train to transport the surgeon and staff to the scene of an incident along with all the required equipment. It contained an operating theatre and a number of beds for patients in a recovery room. Hospital cars significantly improved the outcomes for victims. These mobile hospitals were the forerunner of the US Army's mobile army surgical hospitals.

Indian Railways introduced the Lifeline Express hospital train in 1991. Its purpose was to serve the needs of rural poor in India. In 2007 a modernised hospital train, the New Lifeline Express replaced it.

== Journals and organisations ==
From the 1880s onwards specific societies were formed for railway surgery. The first of these was the Surgical Society of the Wabash, formed in 1881 and organised by the chief surgeon of the Wabash Railroad. The inaugural meeting had only twenty-two attendees with two papers presented. This was soon followed by many other company centred organisations. The Pennsylvania Railroad organisation was the prime mover in forming the National Association of Railway Surgeons (NARS) in 1888. The inaugural meeting had two hundred attendees and by 1891 the membership had grown to nearly a thousand. However, NARS was short-lived, dying out in the 1920s as industrial expansion caused the railways to no longer be unique in their medical needs. Nevertheless, there were still practising railway surgeons for some time after this.

In 1891, the journal Railway Age began a column on railway surgery, including the proceedings of NARS. The editor, R. Harvey Reed, was a charter member of NARS but left to form the more exclusive American Academy of Railway Surgeons. The two organisations remained rivals until 1904 when they merged to form the American Association of Railway Surgeons (AARS). The Railway Surgeon was launched in 1894 and took over from Railway Age as the official journal of NARS, but it also carried articles from the American Academy. It was the official journal of NARS, 1894–1897; of the International Association of Railway Surgeons, 1897–1904; and of the AARS, 1904–1929.

The changing names and affiliations of the Railway Surgeon across the years reflects the absorption of railway surgery into the more general occupational health and the spread of industrial medicine. Railway Surgeon (1894–1904), became Railway Surgical Journal (1904–1921), became Surgical Journal Devoted to Traumatic and Industrial Surgery (1921–1929), absorbed by International Journal of Medicine and Surgery (1923–1935), with Industrial Medicine (1932–1935), became International Journal of Industrial Medicine and Surgery (1935–1949), became Industrial Medicine and Surgery (1949–1967), became IMS, Industrial Medicine and Surgery (1968–1973), became The International Journal of Occupational Health and Safety (1974–1975), became Occupational Health and Safety (1976–present).

Criticism of Erichsen and "railway spine" was particularly strident in the US with NARS and its journal, the Railway Surgeon leading the attack. So much effort was devoted to discrediting the condition as medically valid that one writer claimed the issue was the reason for existence of the association. Prominent in NARS for speaking out against Erichsen was Warren Bell Outten, chief surgeon for the Missouri Pacific Railway.

In India, the Association of Railway Surgeons of India held its first annual meeting in 2001.

== Notable railway surgeons ==
- Andrew Sexton Gray (1826–1907), resident railway surgeon during the construction of the Geelong–Ballarat railway line, Victoria, Australia,
- Christian Berry Stemen (1836–1915), chief surgeon for the Pennsylvania Railroad, founded the Railway Surgeon, author of the earliest book on railway surgery in 1890, and founder of Taylor University,
- Thomas Bond (1841–1901), consultant surgeon to the Great Eastern Railway and Great Western Railway in Britain, better known for his investigation of the Jack the Ripper case,
- Warren Bell Outten (1844–1911), chief surgeon for the Missouri Pacific Railway, leader in the National Association of Railway Surgeons, and vocal critic of Erichsen,
- Herbert W. Page (1845–1926), consulting surgeon to the London and North-Western Railway in Britain and opponent of Erichsen,
- Sofie Herzog (1846–1925), chief surgeon for the St. Louis, Brownsville and Mexico Railway, not realising they had appointed a woman, the company head office attempted to get her to resign but without success,
- Maurice Macdonald Seymour (1857–1929), chief surgeon for the Manitoba South-Western Railway and railway surgeon for the Canadian Pacific Railway during its construction,
- Clinton B. Herrick (b. 1859), president of the New York State Association of Railway Surgeons and author of an authoritative textbook on railway surgery,
- Evan O'Neill Kane (1861–1932), railway surgeon for five different railroads in the US.

== Bibliography ==
- Aldrich, Mark, "Train wrecks to typhoid fever: the development of railroad medicine organizations, 1850 to World War I", Bulletin of the History of Medicine, vol. 75, no. 2, pp. 254–289, Summer 2001.
- Aldrich, Mark, Death Rode the Rails: American Railroad Accidents and Safety, 1828–1965, Johns Hopkins University Press, 2006 ISBN 0801882362.
- Anderson, Greta, More Than Petticoats: Remarkable Texas Women, Rowman & Littlefield, 2013 ISBN 1493001752.
- Armstrong, Tim, "Two types of shock in modernity", Critical Quarterly, vol. 42, iss. 1, pp. 60–73, April 2000.
- Bailey, Pearce, "Hysteria as an asset", Popular Science Monthly, vol. 74, pp. 568–574, June 1909 ISSN 0161-7370.
- Bear, Laura, Lines of the Nation: Indian Railway Workers, Bureaucracy, and the Intimate Historical Self, Columbia University Press, 2007 ISBN 9780231140027.
- Bond, Thomas, "Railway injuries", pp. 294–306 in Heath, Christopher, Dictionary of Practical Surgery, vol. 2, London: Smith, Elder & Co., 1887 OCLC 970702605.
- Brown, Edward M, "Regulating damage claims for emotional injuries before the First World War", Behavioral Sciences & the Law, vol. 8, iss. 4, pp. 421–434, Autumn 1990.
- Caplan, Eric Michael, Medicalizing the Mind: The Invention of American Psychotherapy, 1800-1920, University of Michigan, 1994 OCLC 712621432.
- Daniels, Rudolph L, Trains Across the Continent: North American Railroad History, Indiana University Press, 2000 ISBN 0253214114.
- Dembe, Allard E, "The medical detection of simulated occupational injuries: A historical and social analysis", International Journal of Health Services, vol. 28, no. 2, pp. 227–239, April 1998.
- Desai, Madhavi; Desai, Miki; Lang, Jon, The Bungalow in Twentieth-Century India, Ashgate Publishing, 2012 ISBN 1409427382.
- Erichsen, John Eric, On Railway and Other Injuries of the Nervous System, Philadelphia: Henry C. Lea, 1867 OCLC 977894289.
- Fletcher, James Ogden, Railways in Their Medical Aspects, London: J E Cornish, 1867 OCLC 931282661.
- Friedman, Lawrence M, "Civil wrongs: personal injury law in the late 19th century", Law & Social Inquiry, vol. 12, iss. 2–3, pp. 351–378, April 1987.
- Gilmer, W P, "The railway surgeon of today", Industrial Medicine and Surgery, vol. 25, iss. 9, pp. 423–424, September 1956.
- Grant, W W, "Railway spine and litigation symptoms", The Journal of the American Medical Association, vol. 30, iss. 17, pp. 956–958, 1898.
- Grosvenor, J W, "The soldier as a total abstainer from alcohol", Bulletin of the American Academy of Medicine, vol. 7, no. 5, pp. 353–369, October 1907.
- Herrick, Clinton B, Railway Surgery: A Handbook of the Management of Injuries, New York: William Wood and Co, 1899 OCLC 13945757
- Lowe, Ronald F, "Andrew Sexton Gray (1826–1907): A Founder of Australian Ophthalmology: His Life and Times", Australian and New Zealand Journal of Ophthalmology, vol. 13, iss. 4, pp. 421–431, November 1985.
- Madan, G R, Indian Social Problems, vol. 2, Allied Publishers, 1967 ISBN 8184244606.
- May, Carl; Doyle, Helen; Chew-Graham, Carolyn, "Medical knowledge and the intractable patient: the case of chronic low back pain", Social Sciences & Medicine, vol. 48, iss. 4, pp. 523–534, February 1999.
- McIntyre-Brown, Arabella, Liverpool: the First 1,000 Years, Garlic Press, 2001 ISBN 1904099009.
- Mollon J D; Cavonius, L R; Marmor, Michael F, "The Lagerluna collision and the introduction of color vision testing", Survey of Ophthalmology, vol. 57, iss. 2, pp. 178–194, March–April 2012.
- Morris, Edwin, "Shock from railway injuries", chapt. in, A Practical Treatise on Shock After Surgical Operations and Injuries, London: Robert Hardwicke, 1867 LCCN 35-34547.
- Page, Herbert William, Injuries of the Spine and Spinal Cord Without Apparent Mechanical Lesion, and Nervous Shock, Hansebooks, 2017 (reprint of 1883) ISBN 3744738434.
- Parker, Chales Wallace (ed), Who’s Who in Western Canada, Vancouver: Canadian Press Association, 1911 OCLC 50006958.
- Rutkow, Ira M, The History of Surgery in the United States 1775–1900: Vol. 1, Norman Publishing, 1988 ISBN 0930405021.
- Rutkow, Ira M, "Railroad surgery", Archives of Surgery, vol. 137, no. 5, p. 624, 2002.
- Rutkow, Ira M, Seeking the Cure: A History of Medicine in America, Simon and Schuster, 2010 ISBN 1439171734.
- Smith, Derek Richard, Creating Environmental and Occupational Health, Darlington Press, 2010 ISBN 1921364122.
- Srinivasan, Roopa; Tiwari, Manish; Silas, Sandeep (eds), Our Indian Railway: Themes in India's Railway History, Foundation Books, 2006 ISBN 8175963301.
- Stemen, Christian B, Railway Surgery: A Practical Work on the Special Department of Railway Surgery, St Louis: J H Chambers & Co, 1890 OCLC 14774044.
- Vingrys, Algis J; Cole, Barry L, "Origins of color vision standards within the transport industry", Ophthalmic & Physiological Optics, vol. 6, iss. 4, pp. 369–375, October 1986.
- Welke, Barbara Young, Recasting American Liberty: Gender, Race, Law, and the Railroad Revolution, 1865–1920, Cambridge University Press, 2001 ISBN 0521649668.
- "Obituary: Mr. Thomas Bond", The Times, p. 7, 7 June 1901.
- "Obituary: Thomas Bond", The Lancet, pp. 1721–1722, 15 June 1901.
- "Railway surgeons in India", Indian Medical Gazette, vol. 4, iss. 3, p. 58, 1 March 1869.
- "Railway surgeons meet", The Hindu, 21 January 2006.
