= RVEEH =

RVEEH may refer to:

- Royal Victoria Eye and Ear Hospital, a public teaching hospital in Dublin, Ireland
- Royal Victorian Eye and Ear Hospital, a public teaching hospital in East Melbourne, Australia
