= Sofie Herzog =

Texas physician (1846–1925)

Dr. Sofie Herzog
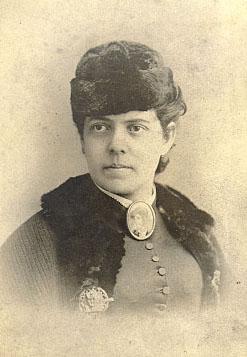
- Born: Dalia or Deligath; February 4, 1846; Vienna, Austria
- Died: July 21, 1925 (aged 79); Houston, Texas, U.S.
- Occupations: Physician and surgeon

Sofie Herzog (née Dalia, Delia or Deligath, February 4, 1846 – July 21, 1925) was an early Texas physician and was the first woman to work as the head surgeon in the American rail industry. She was the first woman in Brazoria to own a car and a telephone and developed her own method of bullet removal.

== Biography ==
Herzog was born in Vienna, Austria, and her father was a doctor. Her father was one of many other doctors in the family. When she was fourteen, she married August (or Moritz) Herzog who was also a physician. Together, they would have fifteen children, though eight died in infancy. They emigrated to the United States in 1886, settling in New York City where August had taken a job in the United States Naval Hospital. In New York, she started studying to become a doctor and finished her training in Austria. In 1871, she earned her midwifery certificate in Austria. Herzog went on to graduate from the Eclectic Medical College in 1894. She practiced medicine for six years in Austria and for nine years in Hoboken, New Jersey, where she had a medical office. In 1894, Herzog's youngest child, Elfriede, married a man from Brazoria. After Herzog's husband died in 1895, she moved to Brazoria to be closer to her daughter.

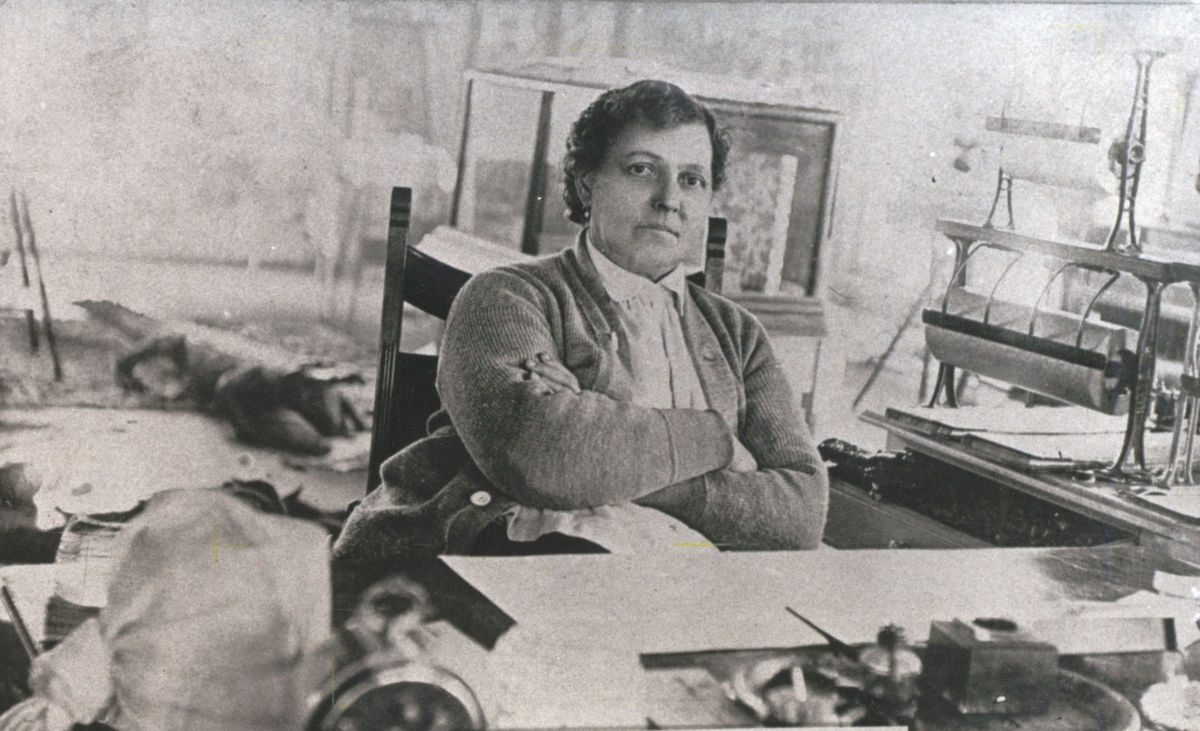
Sofie Herzog in her office in Brazoria.

In Brazoria, she was one of the first people to own a car and have a telephone. She also built her own home, where she also treated patients of all races and began to ride horses astride, wearing split skirts. Herzog developed her own method, using gravity, for extracting bullets from gunshot wounds. This method of removing bullets caught the attention of the South Texas Medical Society (STMS), who invited her to speak at their conference. She later had a necklace made out of twenty-four bullets she successfully extracted and wore it often. She would eventually be buried with the necklace. She also kept records of the births of children she had delivered and by the time she was 70, had overseen 1,733 births in Brazoria alone. In 1897, Herzog became the first woman to become a member of STMS. She also was known for attending every semi-annual meeting of the group.

Herzog bought The Jefferson Hotel, which was located across from her office. The hotel became a community center and provided housing for famous visitors to the city. She also opened a library and built an Episcopal Church after changing her religion from Catholicism due to a "dispute with a priest over the condition of the Catholic Cemetery." Herzog had wanted to clean up the Catholic Cemetery, but many protesters did not want the cemetery tampered with in any way.

In 1905, Herzog was hired by the railroad commission board for the St. Louis, Brownsville and Mexico Railway. The eastern officials of the railroad found out that a woman had been hired, and asked her to quit; Herzog refused, saying that they could fire her if she failed to do her job. Working for the railroad as the first (and only) woman working as a railroad surgeon made her famous in the United States. She remained with the railroad until her retirement a few months before she died.

Herzog joked in a 1911 newspaper profile that "if you can find a husband for me, I can support one. He need not do anything except call me 'honey' and 'sugar plum'". She remarried in 1913, to the owner of Ellersly Plantation, Colonel Marion Huntington, and both parties filed prenuptial agreements in order to retain separate control of their properties. Herzog added his last name to hers on her business cards, moved into his house, and commuted to her office in her Ford car.

Herzog died a few months after having a stroke, in a Houston hospital on July 21, 1925.
