= K. A. Abraham =

Indian interventional cardiologist and medical writer (1942–2021)

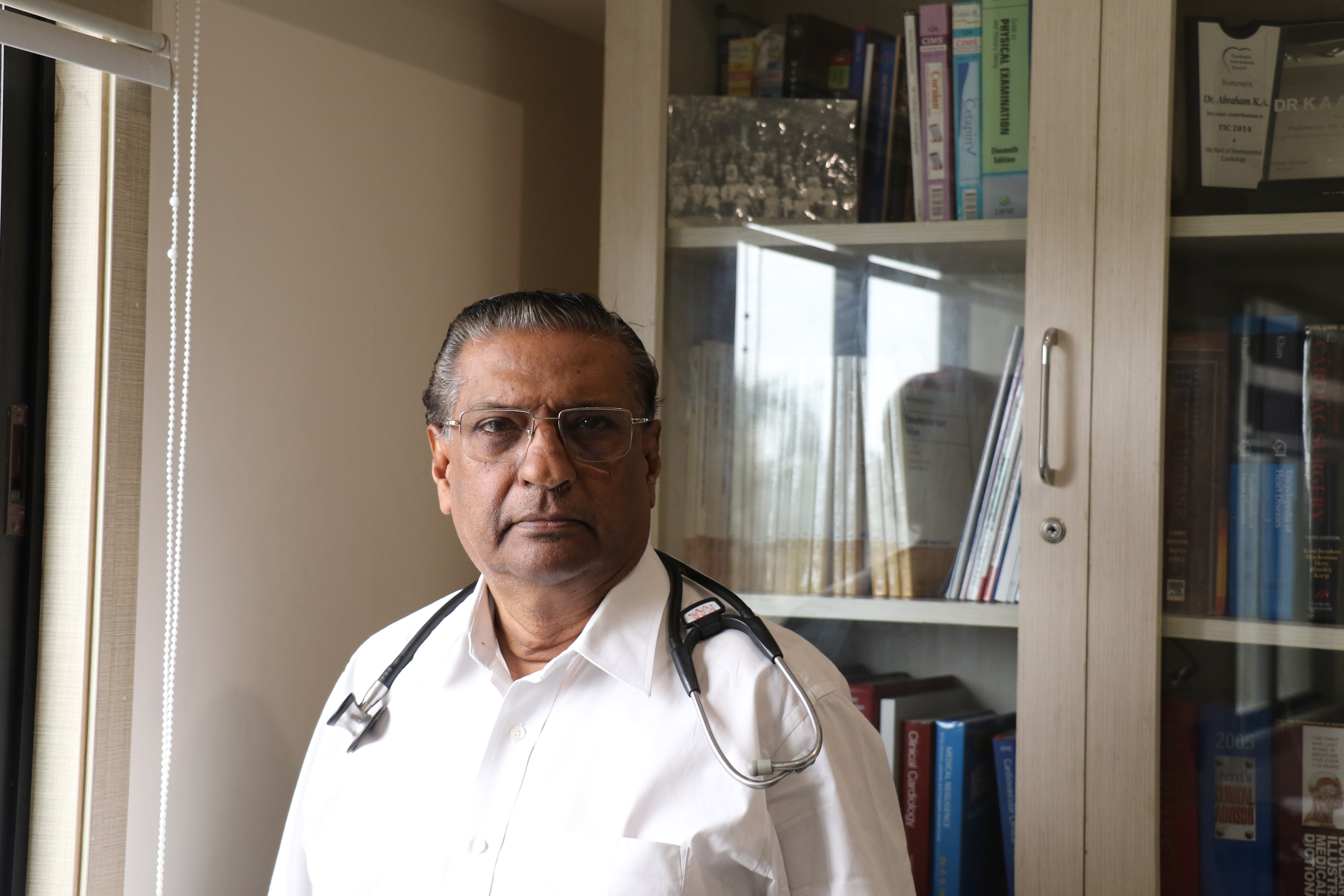
- Born: 14 March 1942; Ayroor, Travancore, British India now Pathanamthitta district, Kerala, India
- Died: 22 October 2021 (aged 79); Chennai, Tamil Nadu, India
- Occupation: Cardiologist
- Known for: Interventional cardiology
- Awards: Padma Shri

Kurudamannil Abraham Abraham (14 March 1942 – 22 October 2021) was an Indian interventional cardiologist and a medical writer. He was a Chief Cardiologist at the Southern Railway Headquarters Hospital, Chennai, and Chief Medical Director of the Southern Railways, where he worked for 25 years.

== Education and career ==
He graduated from the Christian Medical College and Hospital, Vellore and started his career by joining the Indian Army, serving the Forces during the Indo-Pakistani War of 1971. Resuming his studies after the war, he received a degree in internal medicine and returned to Christian Medical College and Hospital in 1973. In 1978, he moved to Perambur to join the Southern Railway Headquarters Hospital, Chennai where he worked till his superannuation from government service in 2002. During his tenure, the hospital is reported to have grown to become a referral hospital which carries out over 1000 open heart surgeries every year.

Dr Abraham served as the Director of Medical Service at Apollo Specialty Hospitals, Vanagaram, Chennai till his death.

After his retirement from Perambur, Abraham worked as the Head of the Department of Cardiology at Fortis Malar Hospital and as a consultant cardiologist at Apollo Hospital, Chennai. He published several articles in peer reviewed national and international journals. The Government of India awarded him the fourth highest civilian award of the Padma Shri, in 1999.

== Selected articles ==
- Margaret D'Mello, Kurudamannil A. Abraham (September 2012). "Assessment of Left Ventricular systolic function by Vector Velocity imaging". Indian Heart J. 64 (5): 532. doi:10.1016/j.ihj.2012.07.017. PMC 3861280. PMID 23102399.
- Kurudamannil A. Abraham, Margaret C. D'Mello (2011). "Systemic RV in Hypoplastic Left Heart Syndrome After Surgical Palliation". J Am Coll Cardiol Img. 4 (6): 687. doi:10.1016/j.jcmg.2011.04.008. PMID 21679907.
