= Bethenia Owens-Adair =

American physician

Dr. Bethenia Owens-Adair
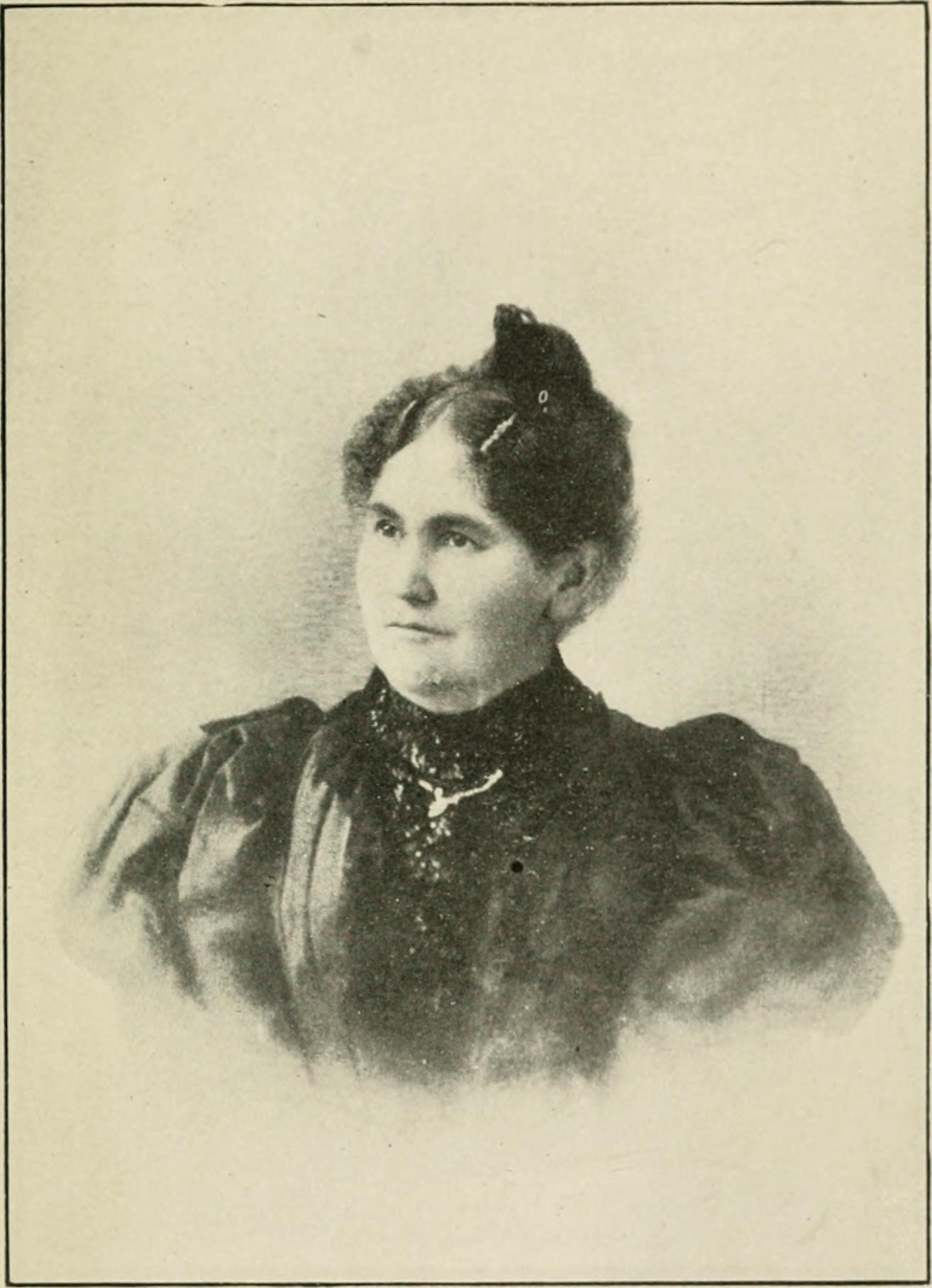
- Born: Bethenia Angelina Owens; February 7, 1840; Van Buren County, Missouri, U.S.
- Died: September 11, 1926 (aged 86); Clatsop County, Oregon, U.S.
- Education: University of Michigan
- Occupation: Physician
- Spouses: Legrand Henderson Hill (m. 1854; divorced); John Adair (m. 1884)
- Children: 4

Dr. Bethenia Angelina Owens-Adair (February 7, 1840 – September 11, 1926) was an American social reformer, advocate for eugenics, and one of the first female physicians in Oregon.

== Early life ==
Bethenia Angelina Owens was born on February 7, 1840, in Van Buren County, Missouri to Tom and Sarah (Damron) Owens. When Owens was three years old, her family, including her parents and two siblings, Diana and Flem, left their home to start a homestead on the American frontier. The family traveled to the Oregon Country via the Oregon Trail in 1843 with the Jesse Applegate wagon train. The family settled in the Clatsop Plains and later moved to Roseburg in the Umpqua Valley.

Owens' parents were successful homesteaders, focusing their business primarily on cattle. Throughout Owens' life, her parents lent financial support to their children. According to Owens' memoir, her father came to Oregon with 50 cents, which he grew to twenty-thousand dollars within a few years.

From 1843 to 1853, the family resided in the Clatsop Plains region, living and working cattle herds on their 640 acres of land. During this period of her life, Owens often served as the family nurse and nanny, taking care of her siblings, and helping with work around the farm. It was during the first thirteen years of her life that she gained skills such as horseback riding, cooking, sewing, cattle rearing, and general homemaking.

In 1853, the Owens family moved south to Roseburg, in Umpqua County, Oregon. During the winter of that year, a former farmhand of Tom Owens, LeGrande Henderson Hill, visited. He spoke to Owens' parents and requested her hand in marriage, to which they consented. Plans were made for the couple to be married the spring of the following year.

=== First marriage ===
Bethenia Owens, age 14, and Legrand Henderson Hill, in his early 20s, were married on May 4, 1854. It was a small ceremony attended only by their close family and officiating pastor. Owen's dowry included her horse, Queen, several cows, fabric, and furniture. Shortly after their marriage, the couple moved onto a 320-acre tract of land which Hill purchased on credit, a few miles from Owen's family home. The couple began to build a home together on their land; however, it was never fully completed. Hill reportedly spent his time hunting or reading, rather than prioritizing the construction of the home. Although skilled in carpentry, Hill never settled into a career. This led the couple into financial difficulty, with Hill eventually selling all of Owen's dowry, excluding the horse. The Owens sold their property and incomplete cabin to the previous owner, and at the request of Hills' parents, the couple moved to Yreka, California in 1856, where they purchased a small property so Hill could mine for gold.

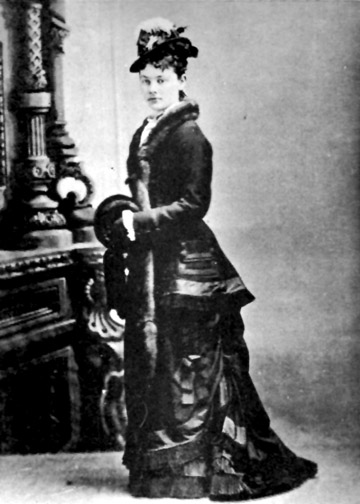
Photograph of Owens-Adair, date unknown

On April 17, 1856, Owens gave birth to her first child, George Owens, at the age of 16. A family member in California, Aunt Kelly, offered to adopt the boy and raise him as her own, but Owens refused. It was around this time that Owens and Hill's relationship began to show evidence of decline. On multiple occasions, Hill physically abused their son, and purportedly choked Owens, leading Owens to seek a divorce. Owens' mother supported her decision, while her father wished her try to save her marriage. Faced with possible social dishonor caused by divorce and her father's advice, she agreed and returned to Hill. Owens' father offered to support their return to Oregon, in addition to giving them an acre of land, so they could be closer to family. Owens and Hill accepted the help and agreed to move back.

The two moved back to Oregon, and Hill went into business with a bricklayer, against the advice of the Owens. The venture was unsuccessful, and Owens and her son were forced to live in a tent. The poor living conditions led her to contract typhoid fever. Her parents took her and George back into their home and helped nurse Owens back to health. This incident resulted in an argument between Owens' parents and Hill. Tom Owens wanted to write the deed for the acre in his daughter's name, rather than Hill's, which created tension in the relationship. Not long after, another incident of abuse occurred between Hill and his son, which resulted in Owens returning to her parents' home. This decision was supported by her parents. Hill attempted to reconcile the relationship on multiple occasions, but Owens refused him and the two were officially divorced in 1859. Bethenia was 18 years old at the time.

=== Early education ===
In 1858, when Owens was 18-years old, she returned to school. During childhood, Owens had been unable to attend official schooling. The family did host a traveling teacher, Mr. Beaufort, for several months where she learned basic literacy skills. Besides taking part in Beaufort's three month long primary school course though, her education was limited. Due to this long break in her education, she was required to attend primary school alongside young children. Frustrated by her inability to read, write, and financially provide for herself and her son, Owens became an ambitious student. After completing the beginning courses, she continued her education in Astoria with her son and nephew, Frank. Upon finishing these classes, Owens had accumulated roughly eight years of schooling.

== Career ==
Owens provided for herself and her son by performing a variety of jobs. Although her family, especially her father, offered to support her and her child, Owens refused their assistance and took it upon herself to make a living. Initially, she found work nursing the sick, ironing, washing, and cooking, and eventually decided to pursue a career in teaching. While visiting her sister Diana and brother in-law, John, she asked to begin a school in Clatsop. Sixteen students showed up on the first day of a three-month term.

While teaching, Owens continued her studies and took side jobs, such as sewing, to accumulate savings. She eventually was able to save enough to build a house in Astoria. However, in 1865, as her reputation as a teacher spread, she was offered a position in a different area. Rather than leave her home, Owens decided that teaching was no longer financially practical and began to consider other lines of employment. At this time, Owens' former husband, Legrand Hill, came seeking a reconciliation. Feeling threatened, she left her home in Astoria and went to live with her parents in Roseburg, Oregon. Her brother-in-law suggested she take up millinery. Owens had little knowledge of the profession, but decided to teach herself and open her own hat shop. Her shop was successful until Mrs. Jane Stokes opened a competing hat shop across the street. To stay in business and learn about current trends, Owens traveled to San Francisco to train under the milliner Madame Fouts. When Owens returned to Roseburg, she was able to reclaim many of her clients and maintain her business.

Eventually, Owens became uninterested in millinery and desired to return to school. While assisting a doctor, she decided to pursue a career in medicine. She announced her intention to attend medical school in Philadelphia to her family. Her family, including her son, were not initially supportive of her choice, but Owens persisted in her ambition.

=== Medical school ===
In 1871, at age 31, Owens left Oregon to pursue a medical education in Philadelphia. She initially attempted to seek admission to Jefferson College, but was rejected due to her sex. Owens then applied to the Philadelphia Eclectic School, but did not have enough experience to be accepted. That summer, she attended tutoring session with Dr. Samuels and was subsequently admitted to the Philadelphia Eclectic School. After a year of study, Owens graduated from the Philadelphia Eclectic School and returned to Oregon to open a medical practice. She received major backlash in Roseburg for being a female physician, leading her to move her practice to Portland. She became one of the first medically trained female doctors in the western United States.

Like many physicians in the American west, Owens was reportedly creative and resourceful in her methods. She implemented asepsis, a new method which emphasized germ theory and the sterilization of medical implements and places. She also used medical baths, a method she learned from her time at the Eclectic School.

In 1877, Owens decided to return to medical school to train as a surgeon. She returned to the East Coast with letters of recommendation in hopes to finally be admitted to Jefferson College, however, she was once again rejected on account of her sex. At the recommendation of Dr. Samuel David Gross, she applied to The University of Michigan, Ann Arbor, and was admitted to the two-year surgical program there.

In June 1880, Owens graduated from the University of Michigan with a degree in medicine and surgery. She also specialized in diseases of the eyes and ears. Owens' had gained a reputation as a doctor in Oregon, and people travelled from across the state to seek her aid. She continued her practice, which moved to Yakima, Washington for several years until she retired in 1905, after 33 years in the profession.

=== Single motherhood ===
In the decades between her first and second marriages, she made active steps to ensure the success of her son, George. She enrolled him in the University of California, Berkeley when he was 16. When George was 18, she enrolled him in the medical school at Willamette University, in Salem, Oregon. Owens also took herself and George on a long vacation to Europe to travel and study under the most successful surgeons and doctors of the time. Upon their return to the states, George was married and continued to have a successful career as a doctor.

In addition to George, Owens adopted a second child from a dying patient, a girl named Mattie. She financed Mattie's education, trained her in millinery, and supported her in becoming a physician. The two reportedly had a close relationship, and there were long periods during which Mattie lived and worked under Owens. Mattie died in her early 30s, which devastated Owens. Owens adopted Mattie's son, Victor Adair Hill, and raised him to adulthood.

== Later life ==
=== Second marriage ===
At the age of 44, Owens married her second husband, West Point graduate Colonel John Adair, on July 24, 1884. The two had met as children and met again as adults. Adair was a widower, and the two had a brief courtship before being married in the First Congregational Church of Portland, Oregon. Adair was a land developer and farmer, but Owens was the primary breadwinner and handled the family finances.

In 1887, three years into their marriage, Owens and Adair conceived and began preparing for raising their first biological child together. Owens gave birth to a daughter, who died three days after birth. Adair was away from home helping to settle land on the coast while Owens was alone in the wake of their daughter's death. Owens moved to Astoria to be closer to Adair, and continued her medical career there for two years. However, concerns began to grow due to complications with Owens health' on account of her contraction of typhus.

Adair urged Owens to move to a farm in the country around Astoria, Oregon. Owens agreed and the couple moved to the farm on July 1, 1888, and lived there for the next 11 years. This initially proved to have a positive impact on Owens' health, which steadily improved, but made her work as a doctor more difficult. The frontier conditions, weather, lack of transport, and distance from the farm made it difficult to reach patients. Despite this, she continued to travel regularly to and from the farm to practice medicine. She also made regular summer visits to practice medicine in Seaside, Oregon. Although Owens and Adair had no more biological children, the two did raise a son, whom they had adopted from a patient and named John Adair Jr. In total, Owens raised four children, as well as helped support her siblings, grandchildren, nieces, and nephews in their education and endeavors throughout their lives.

In 1898, the combination of the physical strain of travel and farm work, as well as the wet climate, led Owens to suffer from rheumatism. Her son, George, advised that she move to a drier climate. Owens and Adair rented out the farm in Astoria and moved to Yakima, Washington. The shift in environment seemed to improve her condition significantly, and she continued to practice medicine, attend schooling in Chicago, and write during this period. Her work began to take priority as her business expanded, and Adair and John moved back to manage the farm in Oregon, so that she could focus on her responsibilities. She continued to travel and work, spending time with various family members and returning to live during the summer months on the coast with Adair for the remainder of their marriage.

Human Sterilization: It's Social and Legislative Aspects, to examine Human Sterilization and Eugenics to improve the human race.

=== Eugenics advocacy ===
Owen published several written works, including Human Sterilization: It's Social and Legislative Aspects. After retiring from medical practice, she actively promoted the eugenics movement and human sterilization. Owens became interested in the idea of human sterilization idea years earlier when she went to the Oregon State Insane Asylum. She waited to make her stance on the subject public due to the controversial nature of eugenics and out of concern for the financial wellbeing of her practice. She wrote articles on mental health for newspapers, and in 1907, she began to advocate for legalization of the sterilization of the mentally ill in Oregon. The bill was defeated in 1907, 1909, and 1911. In 1913, she advocated for House Bill 69 (the Lewelling Sterilization Bill), which "targeted criminals, epileptics, insane and feeble-minded persons.'" The bill passed in the Oregon House of Representatives, but received significant opposition in the State Senate. Despite the opposition, on February 18, 1913, Governor Oswald West signed House Bill 69.

The Anti-sterilization League formed after the passing of this act. House Bill 69 was soon overturned, and a revised eugenics bill was passed in 1917, before being repealed in 1921, amended in 1923 and eventually dismantled in 1983. Nevertheless, Owens was called the "pioneer advocate" of the Pacific Northwest eugenic sterilization movement.

=== Other activism ===
Owens was an advocate for women's suffrage and the temperance movement. She occasionally wrote articles for the New Northwest Newspaper on women's suffrage. Owens worked alongside well-known reformers such as Abigail Scott Duniway and Susan B. Anthony, and Anthony even supported Owens' ambition to become a doctor.

== Death ==
Owens died on September 11, 1926, aged 86, in Clatsop County. She died of an inflamed heart lining and is buried at Ocean View Cemetery in Astoria, Oregon.
