= Perambur railway station =

Railway station in Chennai, India

Perambur
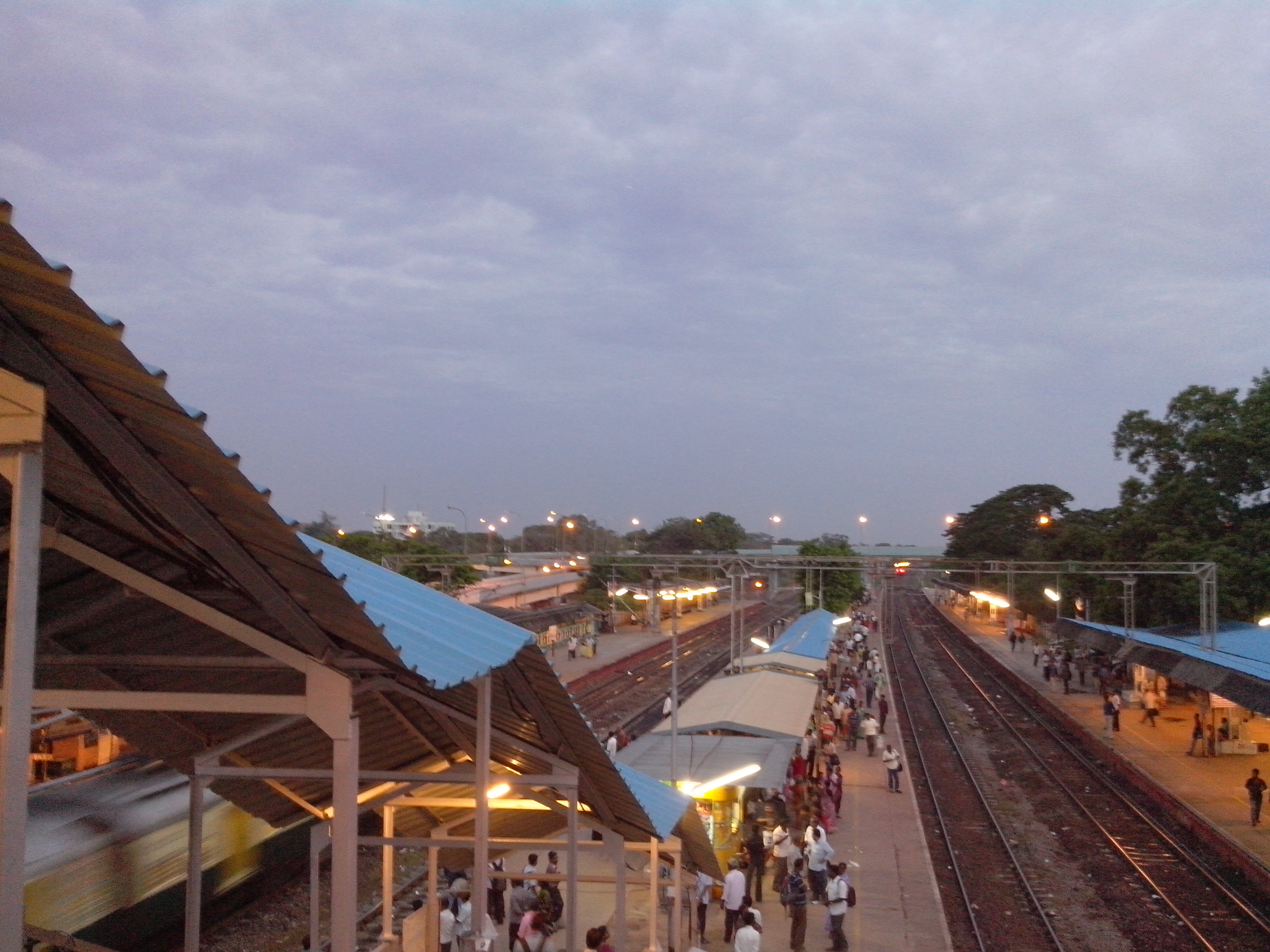
- Perambur railway station, with a view of the Perambur flyover

General information
- Coordinates: 13.107701°N 80.244806°E
- System: Indian Railways and Chennai Suburban Railway station
- Owner: Indian Railways
- Lines: West, West North and West South lines of Chennai Suburban Railway; Mumbai–Chennai line
- Platforms: 4
- Tracks: 4
- Connections: Purple Line Perambur; MTC

Construction
- Structure type: Standard on-ground station
- Parking: Available

Other information
- Status: Active
- Station code: PER
- Fare zone: Southern Railways

History
- Electrified: 29 November 1979
- Former names: Madras and Southern Mahratta Railway

Passengers
- 2013: 40,000/day

Services
Preceding station	Indian Railways	Following station
Arakkonam Junction towards Bangalore City	Chennai Central–Bangalore City line	Chennai Central Terminus
Preceding station	Chennai Suburban	Following station
Perambur Carriage Works towards Arakkonam Junction	West Line	Vyasarpadi Jeeva towards Chennai Central MMC
Route map
Chennai Central MMC — Jolarpet
Location
- Location within India Location within Tamil Nadu

Perambur railway station (station code: PER) is an NSG–3 category Indian railway station in Chennai railway division of Southern Railway zone. It is located in Perambur one of the important stations in Chennai, in the Chennai Beach/Chennai Central–Arakkonam section of the Chennai Suburban Railway network. This station acts as the Hub station for various long distance pass by trains through Chennai in such a way that those trains won't touch Chennai Central railway station which reduced the time by a great extent as the rake reversal problem for the long distance pass by trains has been eliminated. Those long distance trains mostly originates from Kerala and Karnataka apart from Tamilnadu but still considerable Tamilnadu origination trains also use Perambur by avoiding Chennai Central Rake/Locomotive reversal. A mega railway terminal station for Chennai (i.e 4th Terminal for Chennai besides Chennai Central, Chennai Egmore, Tambaram) is also planned near to the existing Perambur railway station. This passenger station serves the city railway colony with its Southern Railway Headquarters Hospital and works, which have their own stations, Perambur Carriage Works railway station and Perambur Loco Works railway station.

== History ==
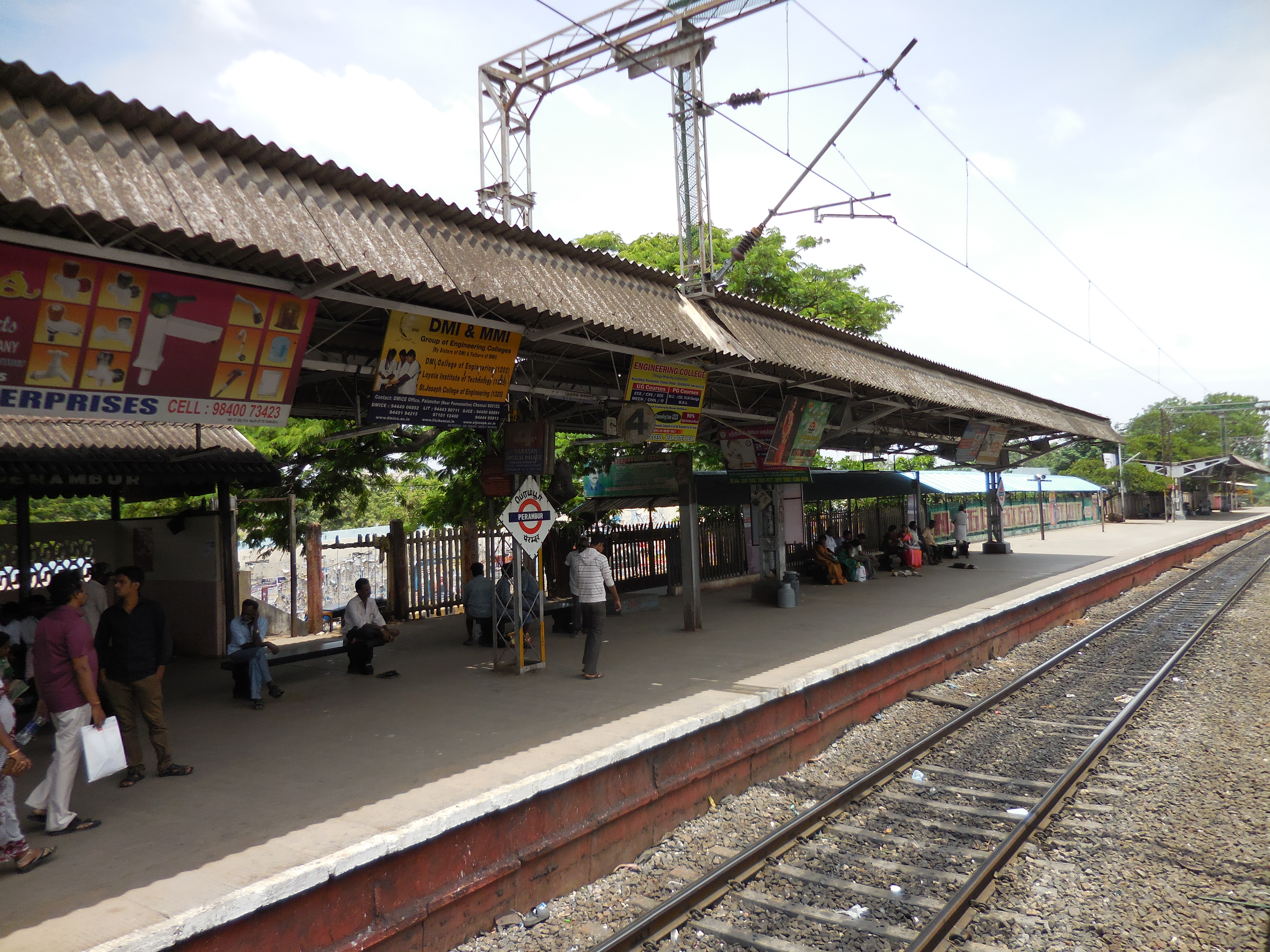
Platform 4 at the station

Perambur railway station is the second oldest railway station in the city after Royapuram railway station. The station was built in the 1860s to cater to employees at Southern Railway's locomotive, carriage, wagon, and coach-building workshops. The lines at the station were electrified on 29 November 1979, with the electrification of the Chennai Central–Tiruvallur section.

== The station ==
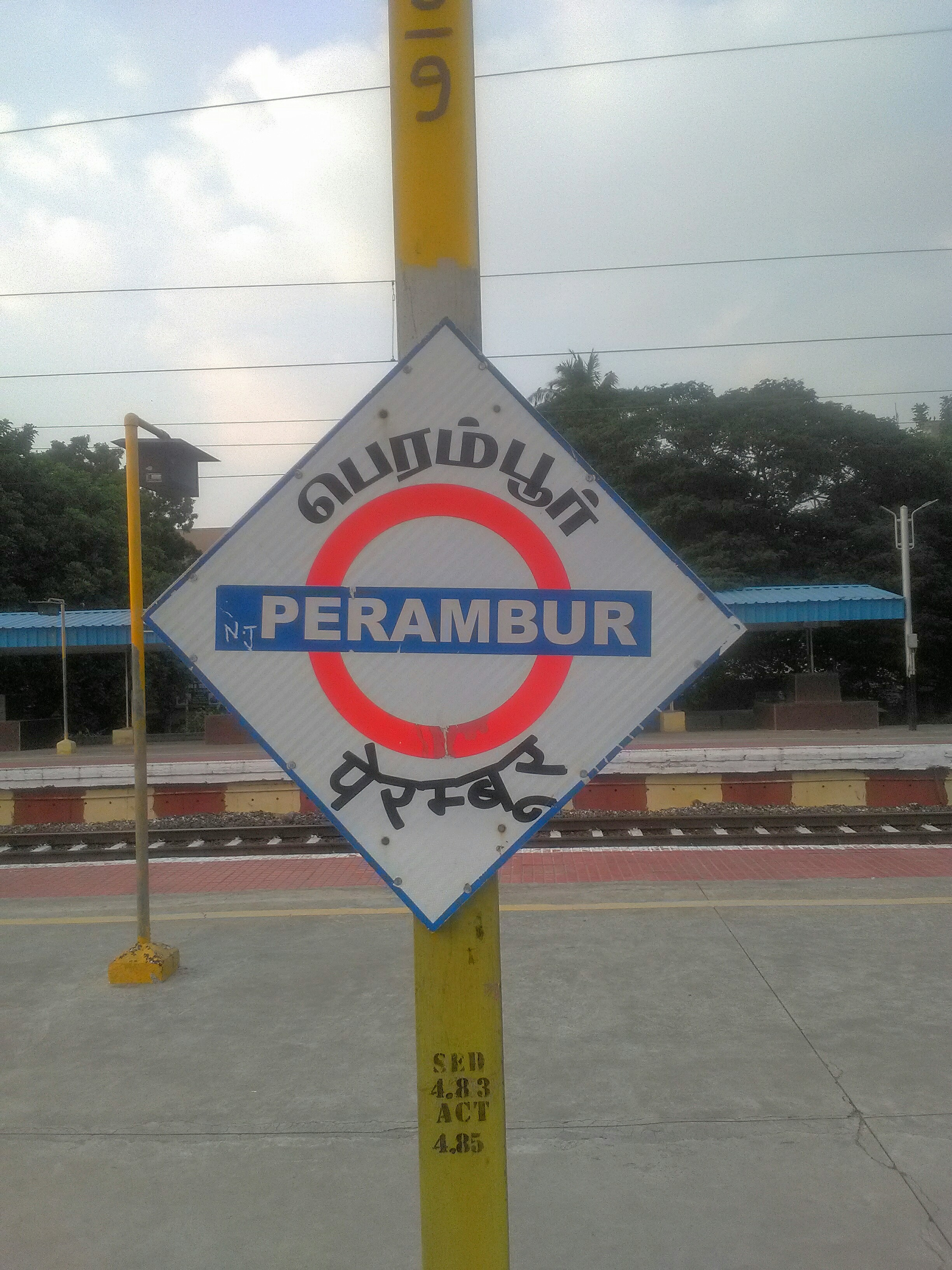
Perambur railway station name board

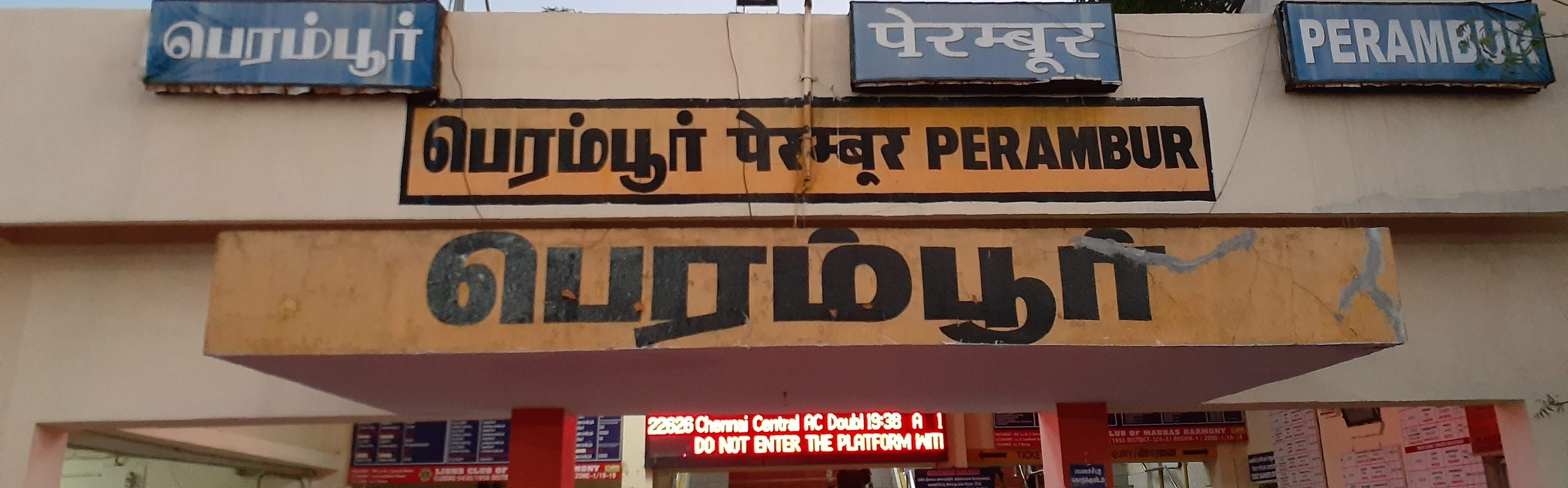
Entrance name board at Perambur railway station, Perambur, Chennai, Tamil Nadu, India

The station is the fifth largest station in Chennai, after Chennai Central, Egmore, Tambaram, and Mambalam in terms of commuter traffic. As of 2013, the station is being used by about 40,000 commuters every day. About 140 suburban services and 29 long-distance trains halt at the station. Presently, the station has only one entrance to the northern side. It has another entry/exit passage near fourth platform.

=== Platforms ===
There are a total of 4 platforms and 4 tracks. The platforms are connected by foot overbridge. These platforms are built to accumulate 24 coaches express train.

=== Station layout ===
G	North Entrance Street level	Exit/Entrance & ticket counter
P	FOB, Side platform | P1 – Express Lines
P	Platform 1	Towards → MGR Chennai Central
P	Platform 2	Towards ← Arakkonam Junction / Jolarpettai Junction
P	FOB, Island platform | P3 Doors will open on the left | P2 – Express Lines
P	Platform 3	Towards → Chennai Central MMC next station is Vyasarpadi Jeeva
P	Platform 4	Towards ← Arakkonam Junction next station is Perambur Carriage Works
P	FOB, Side platform | P4 Doors will open on the left
G	South Entrance Street level	Exit/Entrance & ticket counter

== Services ==
All of the suburban trains except train no. 66021 (Chennai Central– Arakkonam MEMU fast local departing from MASS at 19.10 hours) passing through this station halt here, and many of the long-distance trains, have a stoppage at this station.

== Workshop ==
Southern Railway's workshop is located here. This workshop was established in the year 1856 to serve the erstwhile Madras and Southern Mahratta Railway Company. It was a combined Locomotive, Carriage and Wagon POH & Coach building workshop and later bifurcated in 1932 to deal with Carriage & Wagon POH activity only, shifting the Locomotive overhaul activity to the new Loco workshop which was built adjacent to the original workshop. These two workshops are served by Perambur Carriage Works and Perambur Loco Works stations respectively. In 1951 the Southern Railway was formed by integrating the erstwhile South Indian Railway company, Madras & Southern Mahratta Railway Company, and Mysore State Railway with all their workshops and assets.

== ICF ==
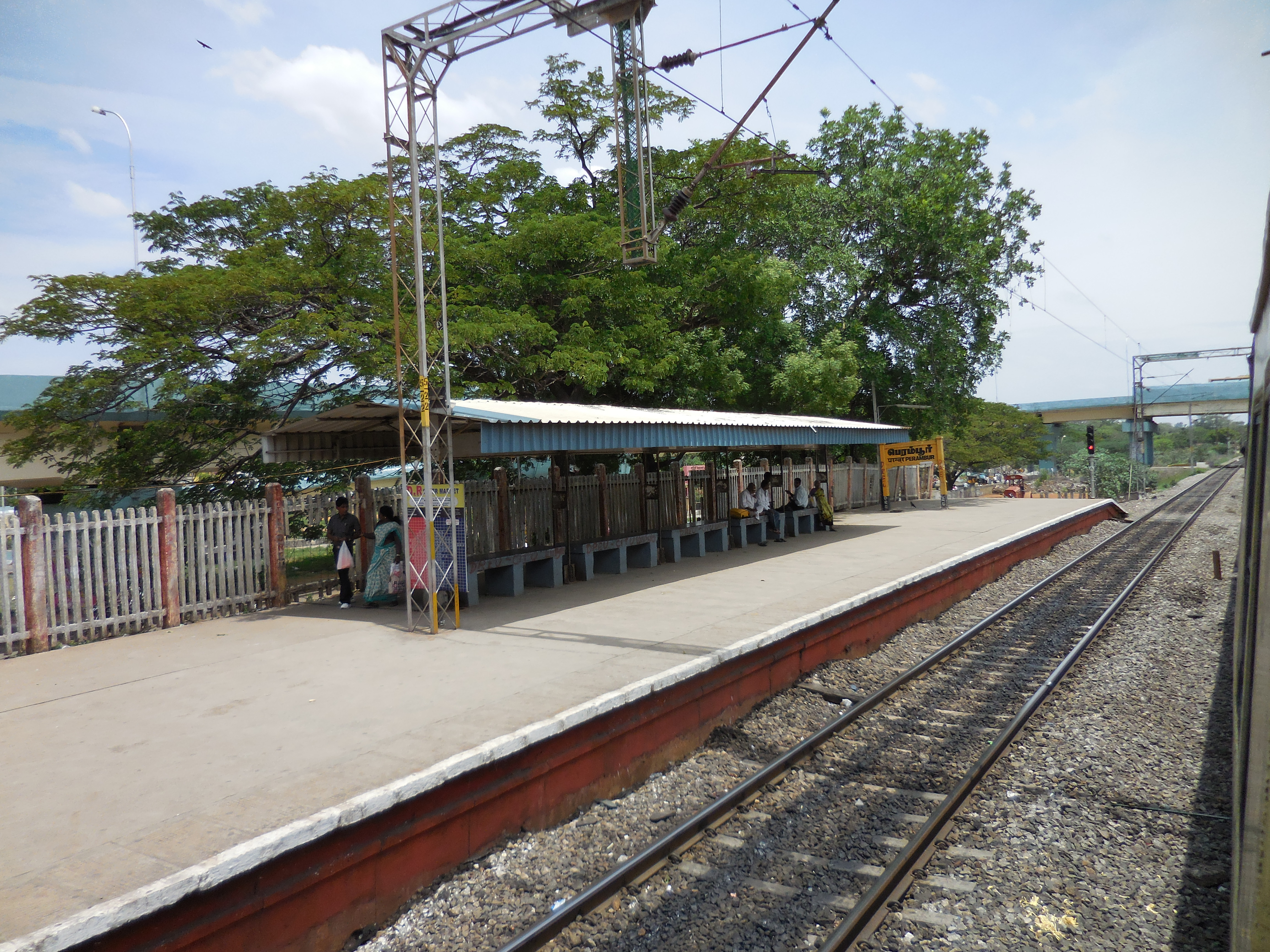
A view of the station towards west

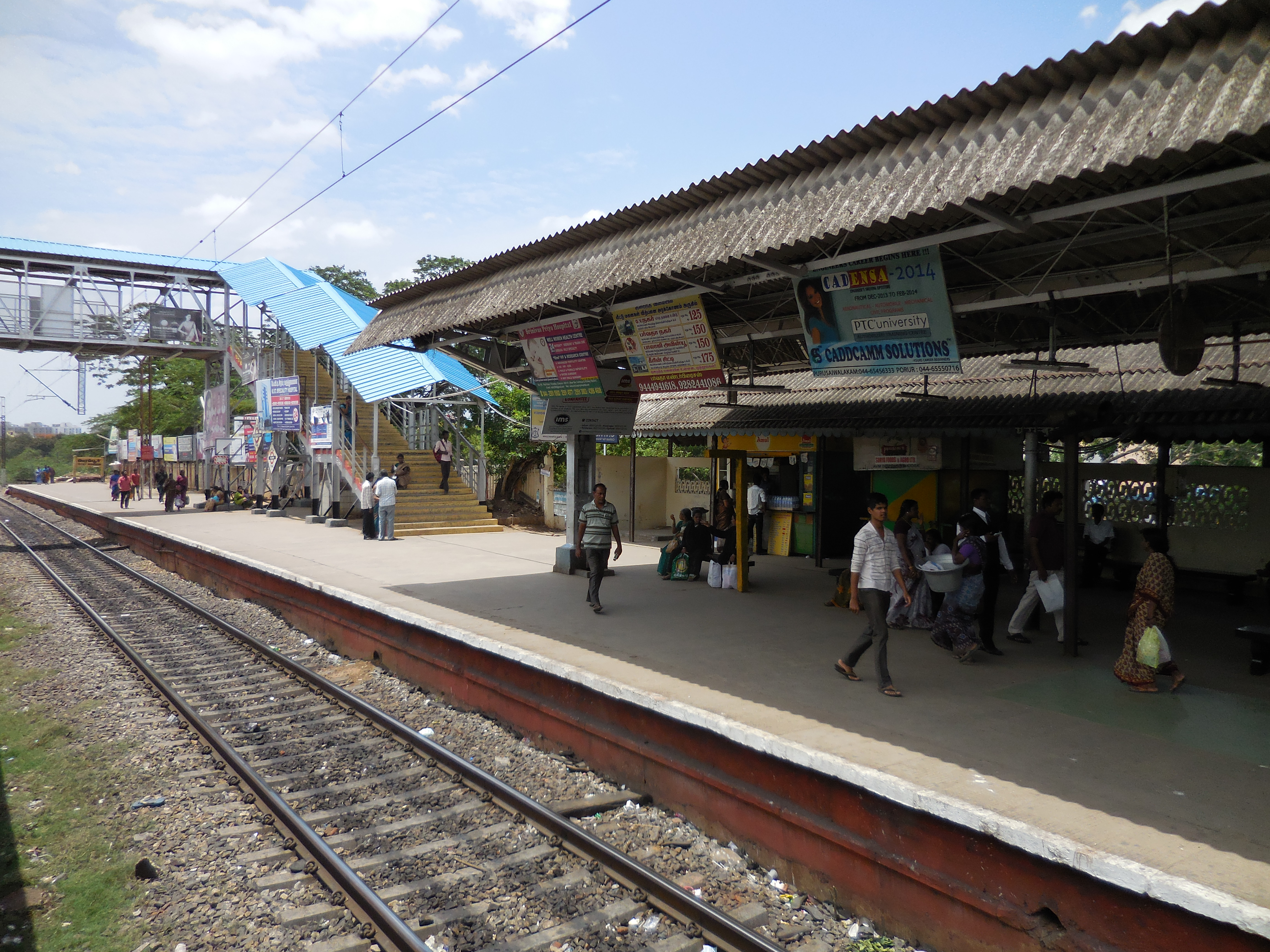
A view of the station towards east

When the ICF shell division was started, furnishing works were done at this works for the new shells turned out by ICF. This activity was done from 1956 to 1963, until ICF furnishing division came out. From 1965 onwards the main activity of Carriage & Wagon POH were started and POH of Air conditioned coaches are being under taken since 1954.

Railways in Perambur is also noteworthy because of the visit of Mahatma Gandhi in 1933.

== Development ==
In 2013, the station was being revamped at a cost of ₹ 12 million, with the work being expected to be completed in 6 months. As of 2013, work on extension of two platforms (platform nos. 2 and 3) is being undertaken to make them suitable for 12-compartment trains. Presently, these platforms can accommodate only nine-compartments trains. There is a new subway coming up in the east end of the station to ease the commuters.

Exclusive two-wheeler and car-parking facility have also been planned on 6,000 sq m. More water taps and coolers, seating arrangement, refreshment outlets and better illumination are part of the renovation. About 220 light will be installed. The dilapidated Government Railway Police (GRP) station will be shifted to a new building close to the station, and each platform will have a police help desk. Since April 2014, a new help desk for enquiries regarding arrival and departure of trains and filing cases against thefts, the first of its kind in a suburban railway station in the city, started functioning at the station.

=== Development in ‘Amrit Bharat’ Railway Stations Scheme ===
In August 2023, the Ministry of Railways under the Second Modi ministry laid out plans for upgrading the Perambur station to international standards at a cost of ₹ 170 million. A scheme called ‘Amrit Bharat’ Railway Stations has been developed under which basic facilities are being provided to passengers at major railway stations.

Perambur railway station, which is a major railway station in North Chennai region, is going to get a makeover under the new railway project. A railway station with a new facade is to be constructed at Perambur railway station.

With this, the face of Perambur railway station is going to change completely. The old building will be renovated and various facilities will be provided. Additional platforms are also being constructed.

The existing ticket booking office at Perambur railway station is not well equipped. Residents of North Chennai area and people from Tiruvallur district are using this railway station a lot to make reservations. A new booking office with modern facilities is planned for their convenience.

The existing ‘parking’ facility at Perambur Railway Station has been expanded and provision has been made for additional parking there. A new footbridge is also planned to be constructed.

=== Multi-modal hub ===
Perambur Railway station will have connectivity with underground Perambur metro station of Purple line corridor, which connects the station with core city areas of Kilpauk, Nungambakkam, Royapettah, Mylapore, Adyar and Sholinganallur.

== See also ==
- Railway stations in Chennai
- Regional Railway Museum
