= Anthony Stanford =

African-American politician

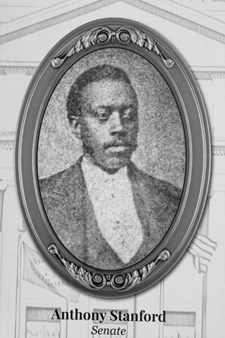

Arkansas Senate
- In office 1877–1880

Personal details
- Born: Anthony L. Stanford; 1830 New Jersey
- Died: 1883 (aged 52–53)
- Party: Republican; Greenback
- Education: Eclectic Medical College

Anthony L. Stanford (1830–1883) was a state senator in Arkansas from 1877 until 1880. He was born in New Jersey. He was a Republican in 1877 and a Greenback in 1879. He was an ordained member of the African Methodist Episcopal (AME) Church. He had a medical degree from Eclectic Medical College of Philadelphia.

He was involved in the emigration program returning African Americans to Africa.

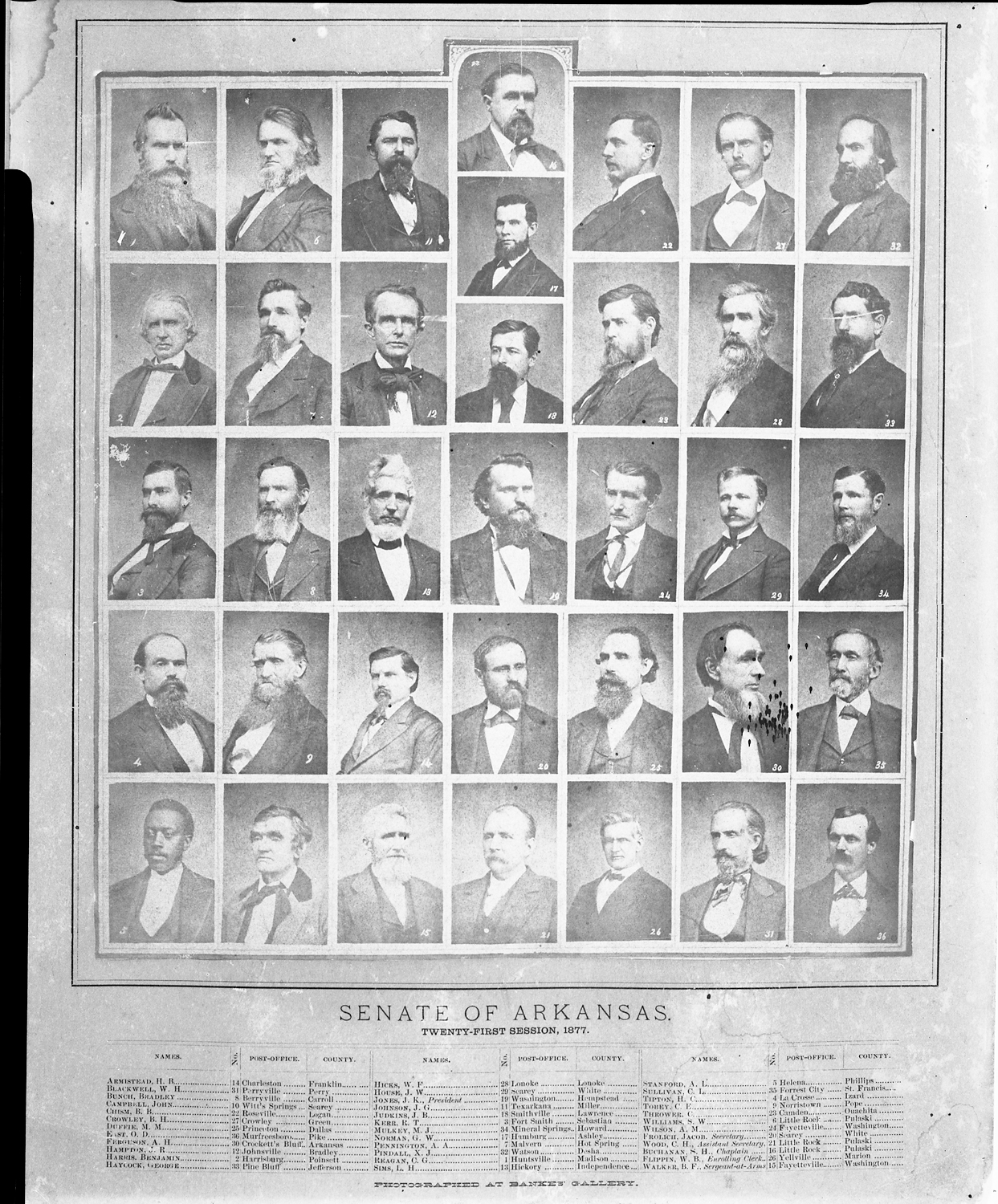
Composite photograph of 1885 Arkansas Senate "Photographed at Bankes' Gallery", captioned with names, county, and post-office. A. L. Stanford is #5 in the bottom left corner

He represented Phillips County, Arkansas and his post office was in Helena, Arkansas in 1877.
