= Elizabeth Johns =

Australian matron and army nurse (1894–1982)

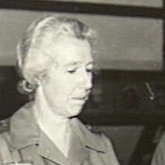
- Johns in 1944 in New Guinea
- Born: Elizabeth Frances Johns; 24 November 1894; Collingwood, Victoria, Australia
- Died: 3 June 1982 (aged 87); Caulfield, Victoria, Australia
- Other names: Lt. Colonel Johns; Elizabeth Frances Shippen
- Occupation: Matron
- Employer: Royal Victorian Eye and Ear Hospital
- Known for: Royal Red Cross
- Spouse: Mr Shippen

Elizabeth Frances Shippen, previously Lt Colonel Elizabeth Frances Johns RRC (24 November 1894 – 3 June 1982) was an Australian matron and army nurse. She rose to the temporary rank of Lieutenant Colonel and was awarded a Royal Red Cross medal for gallantry. In peace time, she was matron at the Royal Victorian Eye and Ear Hospital in Melbourne.

== Life ==
Shippen was born in the Melbourne suburb of Collingwood in 1894. Her Australian mother was Jessie McKinley (born Taylor) and her British-born father was William Yeomans John Johns. She was their second child and they had two more. She trained as a nurse and as a midwife and in 1940 she was promoted to matron at the Victorian Eye and Ear Hospital. The appointment was short as she volunteered to join the Australian Army Nursing Service. She joined the service and in October 1940 she was promoted again to the rank of matron.

In 1941, she was with the 2/7th Australian General Hospital in the Middle East where she was in charge of a 1200-bed hospital near Jerusalem at Rehovot. She moved to other locations, and in February 1943 was back in Australia. In April that year, her "gallant and distinguished service" was rewarded with a first-class Royal Red Cross medal and she was promoted to the rank of Major. In October, she rejoined the 2/7th AGH, who by then were in Papua New Guinea.

When the war ended, she returned to Royal Victorian Eye and Ear Hospital again as matron.

After the war, she was the 2/7th AGH Association's patron, and a proud attendee of Anzac Day parades for several years wearing her Royal Red Cross and other medals. In 1953, she was briefly the wife of John Mitchell Shippen before he died.

Shippen died in the Melbourne suburb of Caulfield in 1982.
