= Divisional Railway Hospital, Golden Rock =

Railway hospital in Tamil Nadu, India

Divisional Railway Hospital
- Southern Railway zone
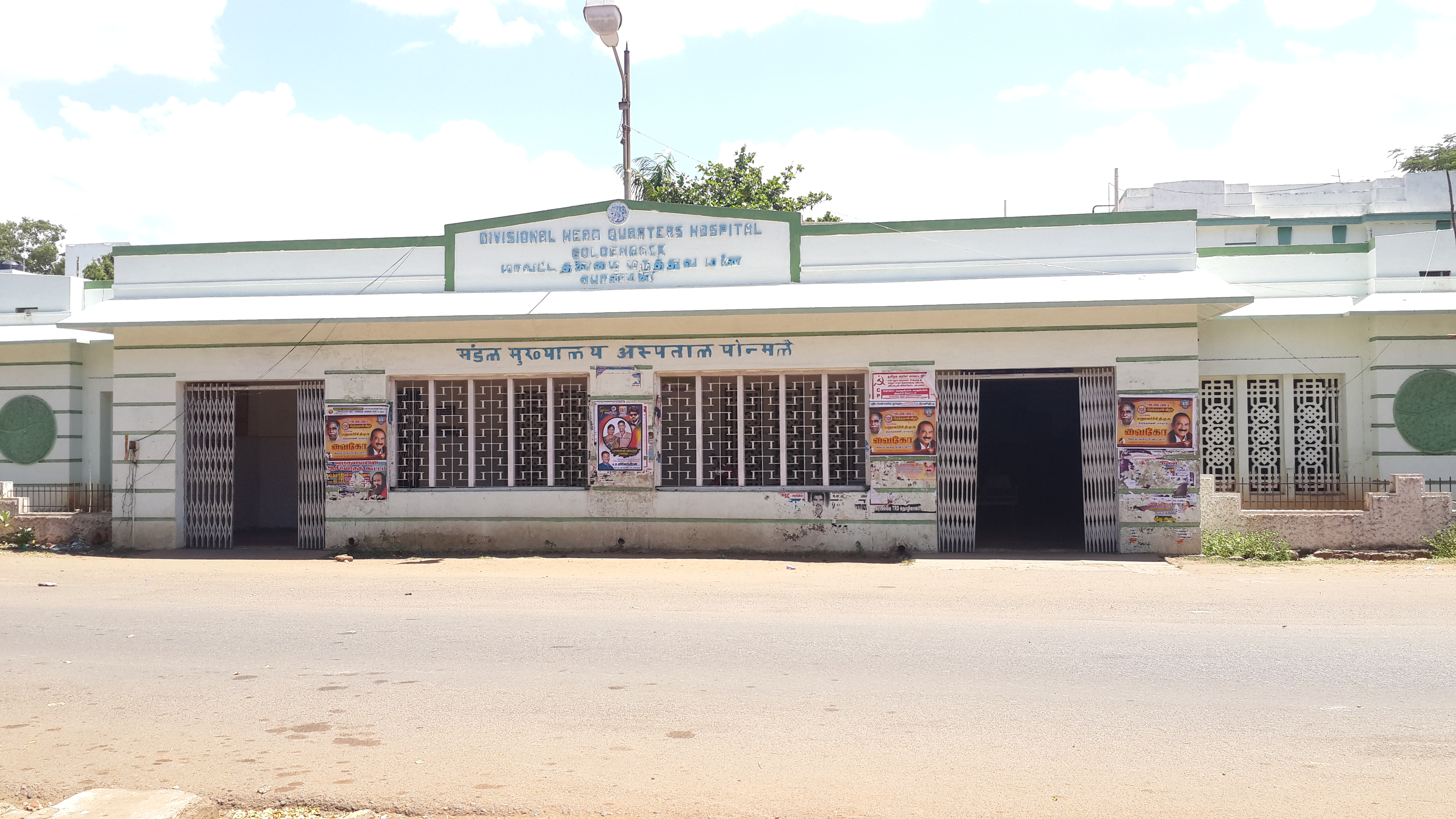
- Main entrance of the hospital

Geography
- Location: Golden Rock, Tiruchirappalli, Tiruchirappalli district, Tamil Nadu, India
- Coordinates: 10.7845°N 78.7253°E

Organisation
- Type: Full-service medical center
- Patron: Dr. V. K. Ramteke (DG/RHS) (Note: The administrators may change from time to time for administrative reasons.)
- Network: Indian Railway Hospitals

Services
- Emergency department: Yes
- Beds: 197

Helipads
- Helipad: No

History
- Founded: 1927; 99 years ago

Links
- Website: Railway Health Directorate

The Divisional Railway Hospital, also known as the Ponmalai railway hospital, is a secondary hospital in Golden Rock, in the Tiruchirappalli district, Tamil Nadu, India. This hospital is managed by the Southern Railway zone's Tiruchirappalli railway division. It serves active and retired Indian Railway employees and their families.

== History ==
The hospital is located amidst the Railway Quarters in Golden Rock, near the Golden Rock Railway Workshop and Golden Rock Shandy. Established in 1927 by the erstwhile South Indian Railway Company, it is the oldest hospital in the Southern Railway zone – older than the Zonal hospital at Perambur, which was constructed in 1928. It is part of Indian Railway Medical Services, which maintains a large network of hospitals – 56 divisional and 9 zonal.

== Administration ==
The personnel health care in Indian Railways is managed by the Director General of Railway Health Services under the Railway Health Directorate, an apex body at the Railway Board. The Chief Medical Director of the Southern Railway zone oversees the health affairs at the zonal level, under which five divisional hospitals function at Arakkonam, Madurai, Palakkad, Thiruvananthapuram, and Golden Rock, headed by Chief Medical Superintendents. As of 2016, the officer in charge of the hospital is the Chief Medical Officer, (Note: Also Officially known as Divisional Medical Officer.) Dr R. Soundararajan, an orthopod, who reports to Dr P. Velusamy, the Chief Medical Superintendent for the Tiruchirappalli railway division.

== Background ==
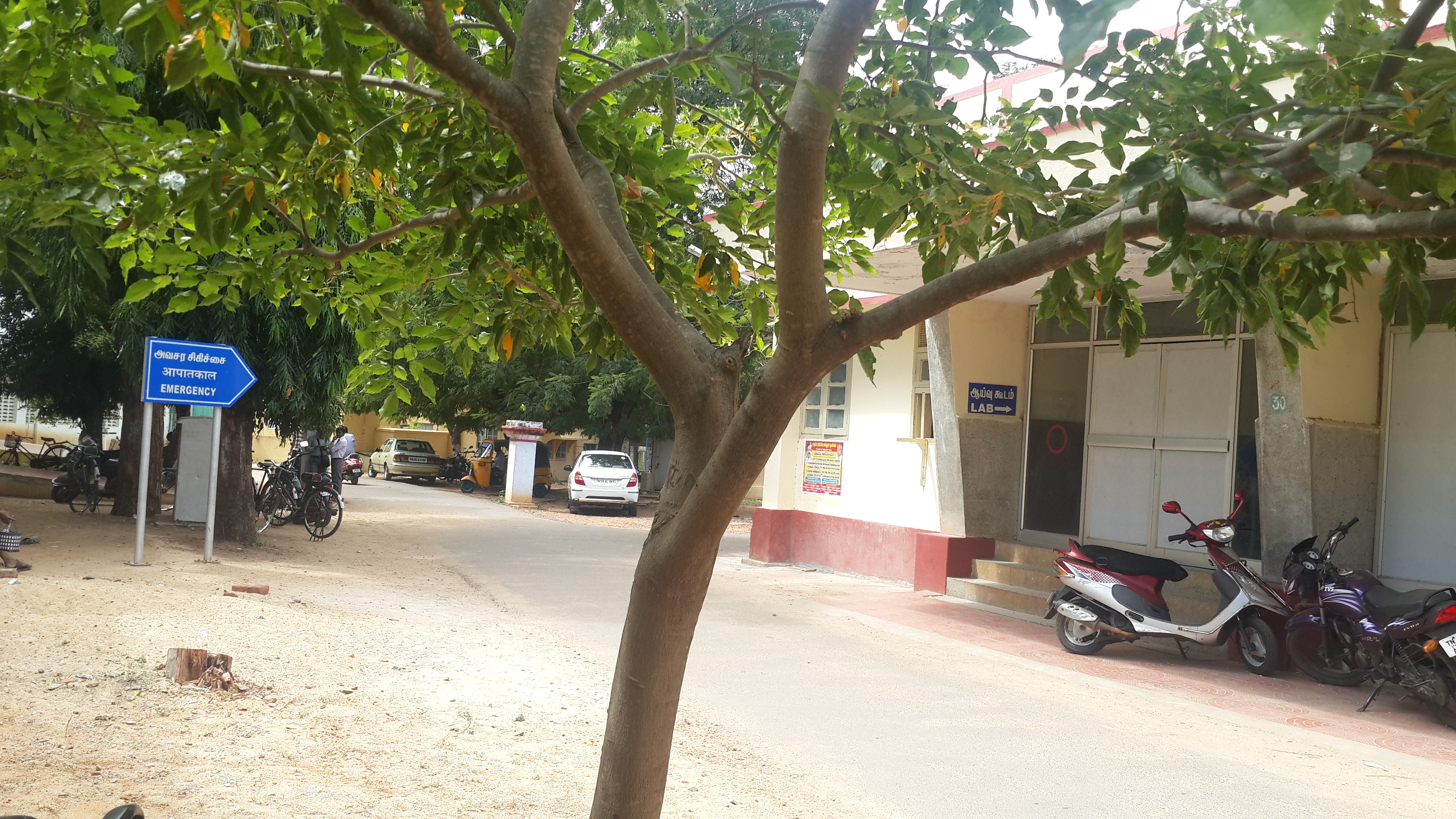
Emergency ward

Being one of 56 divisional railway hospitals in India, the hospital functions exclusively for the benefit of serving and retired railway employees and their families, comprising about 100,000 people belonging to the Tiruchirappalli railway division and spanning 10 districts of Tamil Nadu. Besides this main facility, the hospital also maintains a 25-bed sub-divisional Hospital at Villupuram and eight Railway Health Units/Polyclinic at Tiruchirappalli Junction, Tiruchirappalli Fort, Srirangam, Vriddhachalam, Tiruvannamalai, Thanjavur, Mayiladuthurai, and Tiruvarur.

== Facilities ==
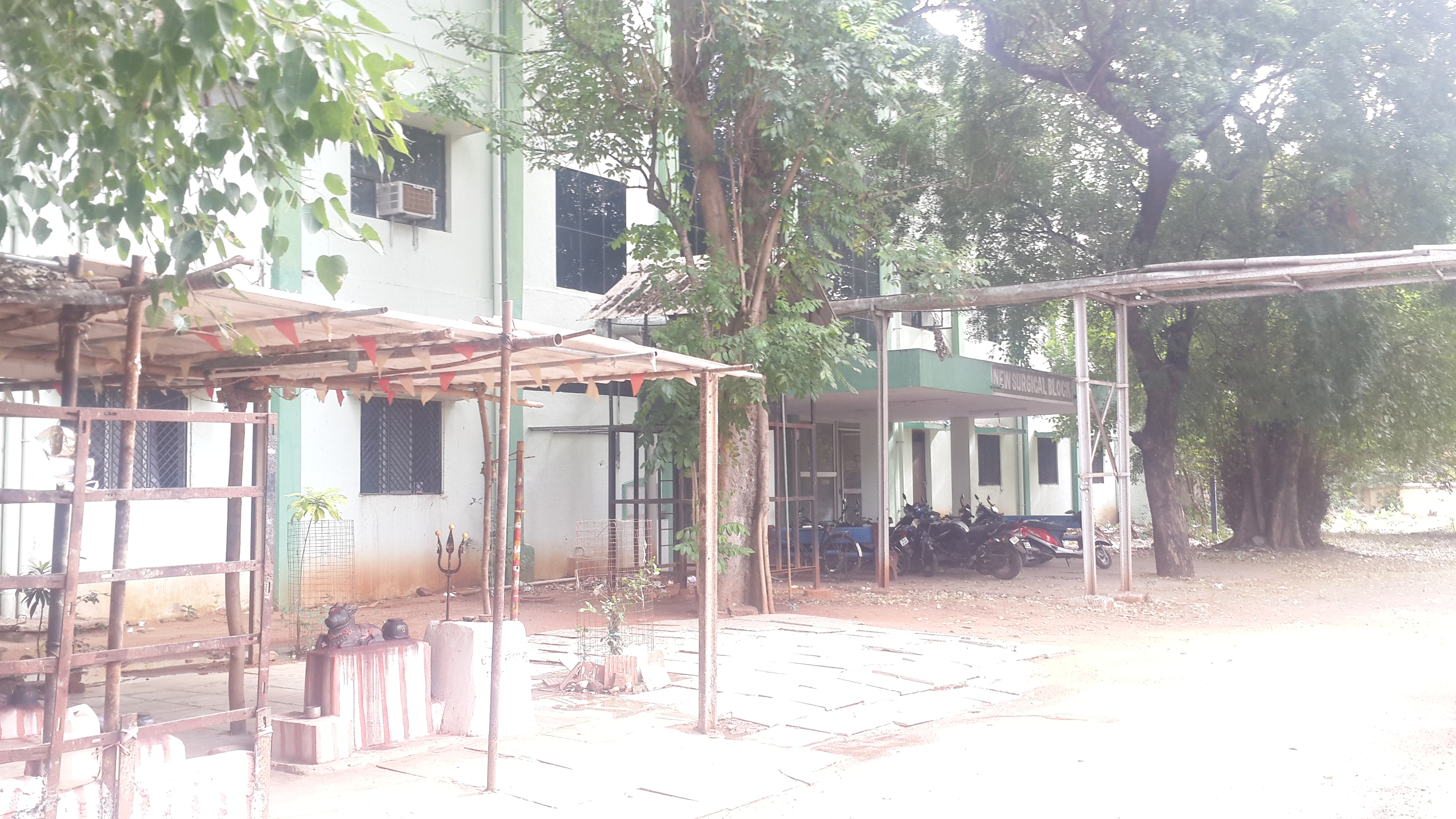
New Surgical Ward

The hospital has 21 full-time doctors in eight departments: General medicine, General Surgery, gynaecology, Paediatrics, ophthalmology, anaesthesiology, physiotheraphy and orthopediatrics. These are supplemented with a clinical laboratory, digital X-ray unit, ultrasound scan, operation theater, casualty department, ambulance, treadmill, intensive care unit, and blood bank facilities. Additionally, specialists in the field of urology, pulmonology, cardiology, psychiatry, dermatology and dental surgery are regularly engaged on an ad hoc basis for the patients with weekly once OPDs.

== Developments ==
The hospital, which is visited by about 600 outpatients daily, also has 197 beds for inpatients, including the 2016 addition of a 100-bed surgical ward. The building that once housed the isolation ward was renovated at a cost of ₹10 lakh (US$10,000) with 12 beds for the sake of inpatients' attendants, with basic amenities for free of cost. About 5 LED television sets and playing equipment for the children at hospital were donated from the Railway Staff Benefit fund. An orthopaedic block with 57 beds was constructed at the second floor of the surgical ward, covering an area about 1,000 square metres (11,000 sq ft) and costing ₹1.65 crore (US$170,000); also installed were a ₹25 lakh (US$26,000) bed lift and an automated analyser and mechanical ventilator at a cost of ₹2.52 lakh (US$2,600) and ₹2.99 lakh (US$3,100), respectively.

== See also ==
- Southern Railway Headquarters Hospital, Chennai
- List of hospitals in India
