= Orthopediatrics =

American pediatric company

OrthoPediatrics
- Type: Public
- Traded as: Nasdaq: KIDS; Russell 2000 Component
- Industry: Medical Device, Biotechnology
- Founded: 2006
- Headquarters: Warsaw, Indiana, USA
- Area served: Worldwide

OrthoPediatrics is an American bio-science company engaged in designing, developing, manufacturing, and distributing orthopedic implants and instruments for pediatric issues. It is based in Warsaw, Indiana.

== Overview ==
Founded in 2006, OrthoPediatrics is an orthopedic company focused on providing product offerings to the pediatric orthopedic market to improve the lives of children with orthopedic conditions. They currently market 24 surgical systems spanning trauma and deformity, scoliosis and sports medicine among others. They hold exclusive rights to the Hamann-Todd Human Osteological Collection at the Cleveland Museum of Natural History. The company is dedicated to clinical research and education and licensed its name to establish a 501(c)(3) public charity focused on advancements in the field of pediatric orthopedics.

== Capitalization ==
In October 2017, they went public with a common stock of 4,000,000 shares and raised $52 M with $13 per share.

== Partnerships ==
OrthoPediatrics has partnerships with 31 independent distributors selling products to children's hospital in the United States and 34 countries globally.

They signed a license agreement with the Sydney Children's Hospitals Network in 2016 and a partnership agreement with Mighty Oak Medical for FIREFLY Technology in 2017.

== Patents ==
OrthoPediatrics holds nine patents for bottom loaded pedicle screw, bone screw, graft fixation, bone screw, surgical connectors and instrumentation, pediatric long bone support or fixation plate, pediatric intramedullary nail, compression bone fragment wire, convertible threaded compression device and its method of use.
