= Royal Victorian Eye and Ear Hospital =

The Royal Victorian Eye and Ear Hospital
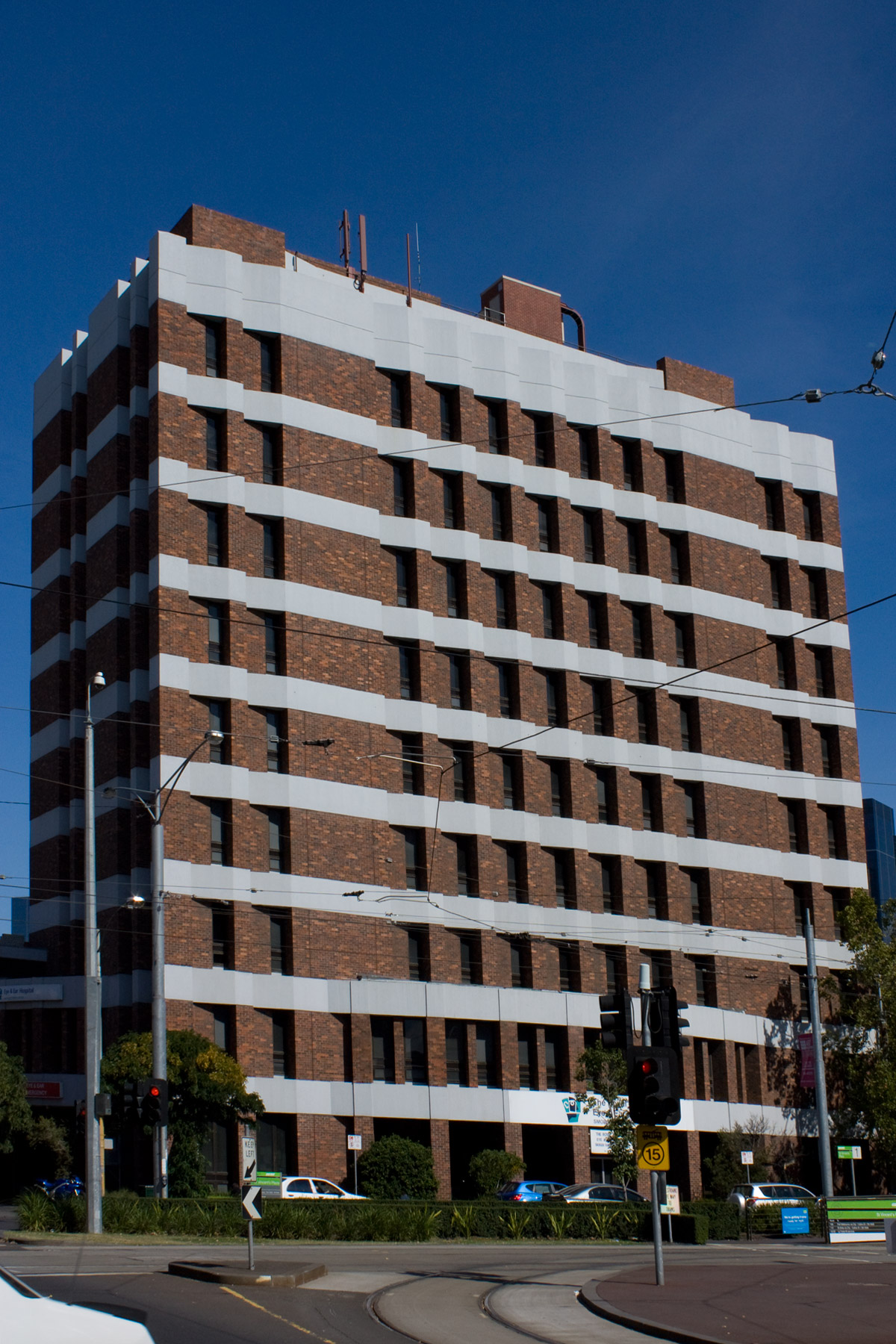

Geography
- Location: East Melbourne, Victoria, Australia
- Coordinates: 37°48′32.8″S 144°58′34.6″E

Organisation
- Care system: Medicare
- Type: Teaching
- Affiliated university: University of Melbourne; La Trobe University
- Patron: Her Excellency Professor the Honourable Margaret Gardner AC
- Network: Inner and Eastern Healthcare Network

Services
- Emergency department: Yes
- Beds: 24
- Speciality: Ophthalmology and otolaryngology

History
- Founded: 1863

Links
- Website: www.eyeandear.org.au

The Royal Victorian Eye and Ear Hospital (the Eye and Ear) is a specialist public teaching hospital in East Melbourne, Australia. It is the only hospital in Australia which specialises in both ophthalmology and otolaryngology.

== History ==
The hospital was established as the Eye and Ear Infirmary in 1863, by Andrew Sexton Gray, an Irish medical practitioner who had emigrated to Victoria. Dr Gray founded the infirmary due to the prevalence of eye and ear diseases at the time, particularly amongst miners on the Victorian gold fields, and also due to poor standards of sanitation and hygiene. In 1870, Gray's infirmary merged with Ophthalmic and Orthopaedic Institution operated by Aubrey Bowen and Ewin Jones, and in 1878 the hospital was granted valuable land by the Victorian government in what was called Tank Reserve in East Melbourne. Its new building was completed in 1883.

In 1945 Elizabeth Johns returned from military service with a Royal Red Cross to take on the role of matron. During her time a post-graduate tutor was appointed in 1950 for nurses to take post-graduate qualifications.

In 1978, the Eye and Ear was the site of a pioneering operation to install the world's first multi-channel cochlear implant (Bionic Ear), developed by Graeme Clark. Professor Clark subsequently established the Bionic Ear Institute at the hospital, and one of the laneways through the hospital site was named Bionic Ear Lane to commemorate the research and development by Clark and his team.

== Statistics ==
As of 2024, the Eye and Ear has 24 inpatient beds. In one year, the hospital treats about 200,000 outpatients, admits nearly 16,000 inpatients. The Emergency Department operates 24 hours a day, and handles around 43,000 presentations a year.

== Geography and redevelopment ==
The hospital comprises three wings: the Aubrey Bowen Wing (built in 1896), the Peter Howson Wing (built in 1974) and the Smorgon Family Wing (commissioned in 1987). There is a tunnel underneath Victoria Parade which links the Eye and Ear to St Vincent's Hospital.

On the 23 April 2024, The Hon. Mary-Anne Thomas, Minister for Health, Infrastructure and Ambulance Services, officially opened the redeveloped hospital. The new state of the art hospital benefits patients, staff and visitors with new facilities and bright open spaces.

In 2021 it began the implementation of a digitisation project designed to improve the way it manages clinic appointments with patient self check-in kiosks and digital display screens to communicate information and waiting times to patients.

== Arms ==
Coat of arms of Royal Victorian Eye and Ear Hospital

Notes
Granted 30 May 1963.
Crest
On a wreath Argent and Gules a falcon Proper ducally crowned Or standing on a closed book fessewise Sable garnished Gold and supporting with the dexter claw a Rod of Aesculapius Or.
Escutcheon
Azure on a cross Gules fimbriated Argent between in the first and fourth quarters an ancient lamp Or enflamed Proper and in the second and third quarters a horn Or a representation of the constellation of the Southern Cross between two anchors in fess Argent.
Supporters
On the dexter side the figure of a surgeon masked and gowned and on the sinister side the figure of a Trained Nursing Sister of the Royal Victorian Eye and Ear Hospital both Proper.
Motto
Teaching Healing Research.
