= Eclectic Medical College of Pennsylvania =

19th century medical college in Philadelphia

Eclectic Medical College of Pennsylvania, later American University of Philadelphia, was a medical college in Philadelphia, Pennsylvania during the 19th century that followed the eclectic model of medicine. It absorbed Philadelphia College of Medicine and Surgery. Alumni included Anthony Stanford who became a state senator in Arkansas.
