= Southern Railway Headquarters Hospital, Chennai =

Southern Railway Headquarters Hospital
- Southern Railway

Geography
- Location: Constable Road, Ayanavaram/Perambur, Chennai, Tamil Nadu, India

Organisation
- Care system: Public
- Type: Full-service medical center

Services
- Beds: 505

History
- Founded: 1928

Southern Railway Headquarters Hospital, Chennai

General information
- Architectural style: Modernism (RCC-framed construction)
- Construction started: 2007; 19 years ago
- Completed: Under construction
- Cost: ₹ 1,900 million
- Owner: Southern Railway

Technical details
- Floor count: 8
- Floor area: 576,000 sq ft (54,000 m^{2})

Design and construction
- Architect: CR Narayana Rao

Southern Railway Headquarters Hospital, also known as the Perambur railway hospital, is a 500-bed hospital of the Southern Railway located in Ayanavaram, Chennai. It is spread across a land measuring 15 acres (6.1 ha) and was established during the British rule in India. The hospital has specialized in 15 basic disciplines and super-specialized in 3 disciplines. The National Board of Examination (NBE) has accredited the hospital for recognition in postgraduate training. The hospital has also been accredited by international institutions such as Royal College of Surgeons for imparting training in PG courses. It is also an approved institution for training nurses.

The hospital was established chiefly to serve the employees of the Indian Railways. The hospital, however, caters to general public as well at a low cost. The hospital is a national referral centre for cardiology and cardiovascular surgery for the Indian Railways.

Southern Railway is constructing a new hospital to shift the current one and is planning to establish a medical college with private participation at the existing hospital premises.

== Location ==
The hospital is located on Constable Road, at Chinna Chembarambakkam, Ayanavaram. It is located between Perambur Carriage Works and Perambur Loco Works railway stations.

== History ==
The hospital was established in the British era. The need to build a separate hospital for the needs of the railway employees was felt in 1925 by the then chief medical officer of the Madras and Southern Mahratta (MSM) Railway, Maj. G. J. Cruikshank. In 1928, a 40-bed hospital was established for the MSM Railway employees in Perambur with a senior surgeon, 4 assistants and 12 nurses. In its initial days, the hospital primarily served the needs of the residents of the railway colony and the employees of the railway workshops. By 1930, the bed count of the hospital was increased to 50 besides additional facilities such as an operation theatre, x-ray centre, laboratory and out-patient services department.

By 1957, the number of beds was increased to 120. In 1958, an x-ray block was established. In 1959, a maternity ward with 12 beds was added. In 1960, a TB annexe with 220 beds was created, and subsequently, a cardiology centre was opened. By 1973, an ICU was started and soon many out-patient clinics such as eye, dental and ENT were also introduced.

By the 1970s, the hospital became an all-India referral centre for cardiovascular diseases. The term cardiac anaesthesia as a sub-speciality of anaesthesia was coined in this hospital in 1977 by physician Kalyan Singh. Soon, the Department of Cardiac Surgery at the hospital was recognised as one of the best cardiac surgery units in the country, especially for complex congenital open heart surgeries in neonates and infants. Along the lines of the Perambur hospital, which focussed on cardiac care, several railway hospitals were developed across the country, namely, Howrah as a centre for orthopaedics, Mumbai for plastic surgery, and Varanasi for oncology.

By 1978, twin operation theatres with 20 beds with post-operation wards for cardiac patients were established. By then, all speciality departments in the hospital became functional and the bed strength was increased to 505. In January 1980, the first modern Cardiac Cath Lab was opened at the hospital. In 1984, the hospital was recognised by the National Board of Exams for Postgraduate Training, when the Y. N. Mehrothra was the chief medical officer. In 1988, Its first candidate, J. S. N. Murthy, brought the Higher Education Link Scheme (HELS), a three-year academic programme, between Southern Railway Hospital and London University, with the support of Prof. Glennis Haworth, S. N. Kumar and Kartar Singh of the British Council, P. Srinivasan of the Jeevan Blood Bank, and the railway administration.

By 1990, a new Cath Lab was established along with facilities such as DSA, laser surgical unit, and video endoscopy. Two more new Cath Labs were since added. On 7 March 2014, another cardiac catheterization laboratory, established at a cost of ₹ 38.8 million, was inaugurated at the cardiac unit of the hospital. The unit was inaugurated by the Director General of Railway Health Services, PS Prasad.

In 2006, the Southern Railway announced establishing a new nine-storied complex to be constructed at a cost of ₹ 500 million, with a ₹ 15-million computer-based navigation orthopaedic surgery equipment, to replace the existing hospital.

In 2009, Southern Railway announced its plans to establish a medical college at the existing premises.

== The hospital today ==
As of 2014, on an average, around 1,400 out-patients visit the existing railway hospital. Across the country's 16 railway zones, the new hospital at Perambur is said to be the largest railway hospital in terms of in-patients capacity and the facilities available. Railway hospitals in Mumbai and Kolkata are ranked second and third, respectively, in terms of in-patients capacity.

As of 2014, the hospital performed around 2,500 cath lab procedures and around 1,000 cardiac surgery procedures a year. About one in four of the cath lab procedures are interventional therapeutic procedures ranging from paediatric interventions to complex valve, coronary and peripheral vascular interventions.

== New hospital ==
A new railway multi-speciality hospital is being constructed at Perambur at a cost of ₹1,900 million. Formed part of the railway budget announcement in 2006–07, the actual work began in November 2007 under Railway Works. The hospital is being built in a campus measuring a little over 14 acres (5.7 ha) and will have a separate out-patient department block and 6 in-patient blocks. These will be constructed in phases. The hospital will have 600 beds, 45 consulting rooms and 14 operation theatres (including 10 general and 4 dedicated operation theatres). The hospital will have 8 floors and a total built-up area of 576,000 sq ft. The hospital is expected to be ready by March 2016.

The out-patients block has two floors while the in-patients block has five floors with each floor measuring 6,000 sq ft. The new hospital would also have specialists in cardiology, orthopaedics, gynaecology, general medicine, paediatrics and cardio-thoracic.

== See also ==
- Healthcare in Chennai
- Divisional Railway Hospital, Golden Rock
