= List of engineering colleges in Tamil Nadu =

On There are 552 engineering colleges in Tamil Nadu as of July 2014. Out of 552 engineering colleges affiliated to Anna University, 14 of them are Government/aided colleges, 33 of them are Autonomous colleges and the rest are self-financing colleges and four are University departments within Anna University.

== Anna University Colleges ==
Anna University - Guindy, Chennai Circle:

No.	College or Campus Name	Location	District	Estd	Status
1	College of Engineering, Guindy	Guindy	Chennai district	1794	Anna University Constituent College (or) Campus
2	Alagappa College of Technology	Guindy	Chennai district	1944	Anna University Constituent College (or) Campus
3	School of Architecture and Planning	Guindy	Chennai district	1957	Anna University Constituent College (or) Campus
4	Madras Institute of Technology	Chromepet	Chennai	1949	Anna University Constituent College (or) Campus
5	Meenakshi Sundararajan Engineering College	Kodambakkam	Chennai district	2001	Anna University Affiliated Anna University College (or) Campus
6	Meenakshi College of Engineering	K. K. Nagar	Chennai	2001	Anna University Affiliated Anna University College (or) Campus
7	RMK Engineering College	Kavaraipettai	Thiruvallur	1995	Anna University Affiliated Anna University College (or) Campus

Anna University - Tharamani, Chennai Circle:

No.	College or Campus Name	Location	District	Estd	Status
1	Anna University - Tharamani Campus	Tharamani	Chennai district	2007	Anna University Constituent College (or) Campus
2	Anna University -College of Engineering Viluppuram	Viluppuram	Viluppuram		Anna University Affiliated Anna University College (or) Campus
3	Anna University College of Engineering Tindivanam	Tindivanam	Viluppuram	2008	Anna University Affiliated Anna University College (or) Campus
4	Anna University College of Engineering Arni	Arani	Tiruvannamalai	2009	Anna University Affiliated Anna University College (or) Campus
5	Anna University College of Engineering Kanchipuram	Kanchipuram	Kanchipuram	2010	Anna University Affiliated Anna University College (or) Campus

Anna University - Trichy Circle:

No.	College or Campus Name	Location	District	Estd	Status
1	Anna University - Trichy Campus	Trichy	Trichy district	2007	Anna University Constituent College (or) Campus
2	Anna University - Panruti Campus	Panruti	Cuddalore district	2007	Anna University Affiliated Anna University College (or) Campus
3	Anna University - Pattukkottai Campus	Rajamadam, Pattukkottai Taluk	Thanjavur	2009	Anna University Affiliated Anna University College (or) Campus
4	Anna University - Thirukkuvalai Campus	Thirukkuvalai	Nagapattinam	2007	Anna University Affiliated Anna University College (or) Campus
5	Anna University - Ariyalur Campus	Ariyalur	Ariyalur	2007	Anna University Affiliated Anna University College (or) Campus

Anna University - Madurai Circle:

No.	College or Campus Name	Location	District	Estd	Status
1	Anna University - Madurai Campus	Madurai	Madurai district	2010	Anna University Constituent College (or) Campus
2	Anna University - Ramanathapuram Campus	Ramanathapuram	Ramanathapuram	2010	Anna University Affiliated Anna University College (or) Campus
3	Anna University - Dindigul Campus	Dindigul	Dindigul	2010	Anna University Affiliated Anna University College (or) Campus

Anna University - Tirunelveli Circle:

No.	College or Campus Name	Location	District	Estd	Status
1	Anna University - Tirunelveli Campus	Tirunelveli	Tirunelveli district	2007	Anna University Constituent College (or) Campus
2	University College of Engineering, Nagercoil (UCEN)	Nagercoil	Nagercoil	2009	Anna University Affiliated Anna University College (or) Campus
3	Anna University V.O.Chidambaranar College of Engineering	Thoothukudi	Thoothukudi	1966	Anna University Affiliated Anna University College (or) Campus

== Tamil Nadu Government Engineering & Technology Colleges ==
No.	College name	Location	District	Estd
1	Government College of Technology, Coimbatore	Coimbatore	Coimbatore	1942
2	Alagappa Chettiar College of Engineering and Technology	Karaikudi	Sivaganga district	1952
3	Government College of Engineering, Salem	Karuppur, Salem	Salem	1966
4	Government College of Engineering, Tirunelveli	Tirunelveli	Tirunelveli	1981
5	Government College of Engineering, Erode	Chithode	Erode	1984
6	Thanthai Periyar Government Institute of Technology	Bagayam	Vellore	1990
7	Government College of Engineering, Bargur	Bargur	Krishnagiri	1994
8	Government College of Engineering, Bodinayakkanur	Bodinayakkanur	Theni	2012
9	Government College of Engineering, Dharmapuri	Chettikarai	Dharmapuri	2013
10	Government College of Engineering, Thanjavur	Sengipatti	Thanjavur	2013
11	Government College of Engineering, Srirangam	Srirangam	Trichy	2013

== Government-aided colleges ==
- PSG College of Technology
- Coimbatore Institute of Technology
- Thiagarajar College of Engineering

== Central Autonomous institutes ==
University name	Location	District	Support	Specialization	Estd.
Indian Institute of Information Technology Design & Manufacturing Kancheepuram	Chennai	Chennai	Center	Engineering	2007
Indian Institute of Information Technology Tiruchirappalli	Trichy	Trichy	Center	Engineering	2013
Indian Institute of Technology Madras	Chennai	Chennai	Center	Engineering	1959
National Institute of Technology, Tiruchirappalli	Trichy	Trichy	Center	Engineering	1964

== Central Government institutions affiliated to Tamil Nadu State University ==
- Central Electro Chemical Research Institute
- Central Leather Research Institute

== District wise ==
Chennai

- Loyola-ICAM College of Engineering and Technology
- Meenakshi Sundararajan Engineering College
- Meenakshi College of Engineering
- Easwari Engineering College
- Jerusalem College of Engineering
- KCG College of Engineering
- Misrimal Navajee Munoth Jain Engineering College

Chengalpattu

- B. S. Abdur Rahman Crescent Institute of Science and Technology
- Sri Sivasubramaniya Nadar College of Engineering
- SRM Valliammai Engineering College
- Sri Sairam Institute of Technology
- Mohamed Sathak AJ College of Engineering
- Agni College of Technology
- Tagore Engineering College
- Anand Institute of Higher Technology (AIHT)
- Adhiparasakthi Engineering College
- Karpaga Vinayaga College of Engineering and Technology
- Asan Memorial College of Engineering & Technology
- ARM College of Engineering and Technology

Coimbatore

- PSG College of Technology
- Coimbatore Institute of Technology
- Government College of Technology, Coimbatore
- Rathinam Technical Campus
- Kumaraguru College of Technology
- KPR Institute of Engineering and Technology
- Sri Ramakrishna Engineering College
- Karpagam College of Engineering
- Sri Krishna College of Engineering & Technology
- SNS College of Technology
- Dr. Mahalingam College of Engineering and Technology
- Rathinam technical campus of technology
- Dhanalakshmi Srinivasan College of Engineering
- V.S.B College of Engineering Technical Campus

Cuddalore

- CK College of Engineering
- MRK Institute of Technology
- Dr.Navalar Nedunchezhiyan College of Engineering
- Krishnaswamy College of Engineering and Technology
- St.Anne College of Engineering and Technology

Madurai

- Thiagarajar College of Engineering
- Velammal College of Engineering and Technology
- Kamaraj College of Engineering and Technology
- Solamalai College of Engineering
- P.T.R College of Engineering and Technology
- Fathima Michael College of Engineering and Technology
- Ultra College of Engineering and Technology
- Vaigai College of Engineering

Erode

- Kongu Engineering College
- Bannari Amman Institute of Technology
- Erode Sengunthar Engineering College
- Velalar College of Engineering and Technology

Kanchipuram

- Chennai Institute of Technology
- Rajalakshmi Engineering College
- Saveetha Engineering College
- Sri Venkateswara College of Engineering
- Kings Engineering College (KEC)
- Rajiv Gandhi College of Engineering
- Jeppiar Institute of Technology
- Pallavan College of Engineering
- Adhi College of Engineering and Technology
- Thangavelu Engineering College (TEC)
- Sri Sai Ram Engineering College

Kanniyakumari

- Arunachala College Of Engineering For Women

Karur

- M.Kumarasamy College of Engineering
- Chettinad College of Engineering and Technology

Krishnagiri

- Government College of Engineering, Bargur

Namakkal

- Selvam College of Technology
- J.K.K.Nattraja College of Engineering and Technology
- Sengunthar Engineering College (Autonomous)

Mayiladuthurai

- A.V.C College of Engineering

Nagapattinam

- E.G.S Pillay Engineering College
- Sembodai Rukumani College of Engineering college
- Sir issac Newton College of Engineering and Technology
- Arifa Institute of Engineering and Technology
- Prime college of Architecture and Planning

Ramanathapuram

- Mohamed Sathak Engineering College
- Syed Ammal Engineering College

Salem

- AVS Engineering College
- Government College of Engineering, Salem
- Sona College of Technology
- Tagore Institute of Engineering and Technology

Thanjavur

- Arasu Engineering College
- Annai College of Engineering and Technology
- Parisutham Institute of Technology & Science

Thirunelveli

- Francis Xavier Engineering College
- Government College of Engineering, Tirunelveli

Thiruvallur

- Apollo Engineering College
- Prathyusha Engineering College
- S. A. Engineering College
- Jaya Engineering College
- RMK Engineering College
- RMD Engineering College
- Panimalar Engineering College
- Velammal Engineering College
- Velammal Institute of Technology
- JNN Institute of Engineering

Thiruvannamalai

- Arulmigu Meenakshi Amman College of Engineering
- Arunai Engineering College
- Annamalaiar College of Engineering
- SKP Engineering College
- Thiruvalluvar College of Engineering and Technology

Thiruvarur

- Anjalai Ammal Mahalingam Engineering College
- ARJ College of Engineering and Technology

Tiruchirappalli

- Saranathan College of Engineering
- J.J College of Engineering and Technology
- Vetri Vinayaha College of Engineering and Technology
- K Ramakrishnan College of Engineering
- K Ramakrishnan College of Technology
- Mohammed Institute of Engineering and Technology

Tuticorin

- St.Mother Theresa Engineering College
- Dr.Sivanthi Adithanar Engineering college, Tiruchendur

Vellore

- Thanthai Periyar Government Institute Of Technology
- C. Abdul Hakeem College of Engineering & Technology
- Kingston Engineering College
- Global Institute Of Technology
- Annai Meera Engineering College
- Sree Kirshna Engineering College
- Ranipetai Engineering College
- Priyadharshini Engineering College
- Bharathi Dhasan Engineering College

== List of Autonomous Engineering Colleges ==
- PSG College of Technology
- Coimbatore Institute of Technology
- Government College of Technology, Coimbatore
- Kumaraguru College of Technology
- SENGUNTHAR Engineering College, Tiruchengode
- KPR Institute of Engineering and Technology
- Kongu Engineering College
- Bannari Amman Institute of Technology
- Government College of Engineering, Salem
- Thiagarajar College of Engineering
- Dr. Mahalingam College of Engineering and Technology
- Sri Krishna College of Engineering & Technology
- Sri Sairam College of Engineering & Technology
- Sri Ramakrishna Engineering College
- St. Joseph's College of Engineering
- SNS College of Technology
- Sona College of Technology
- Sethu Institute of Technology
- Karpagam College of Engineering
- Jerusalem College of Engineering
- Erode Sengunthar Engineering College
- M.Kumarasamy College of Engineering
- National Engineering College
- Mepco Schlenk Engineering College
- Adhiyamaan College of Engineering
- K. S. Rangasamy College of Technology
- Velalar College of Engineering and Technology
- Nandha Engineering College
- Mahendra Engineering College
- Sri Sivasubramaniya Nadar College of Engineering
- Sri Venkateswara College of Engineering
- Easwari Engineering College
- E.G.S Pillay Engineering College
- Rajalakshmi Engineering College
- Velammal Engineering College
- Valliammai Engineering College
- IFET College of Engineering
- Velalar College of Engineering and Technology
- Saveetha Engineering College
- Sri Shakthi Institute of Engineering & Technology, Coimbatore
- Muthayammal Engineering College, Rasipuram
- Hindusthan College Of Engineering And Technology, Coimbatore
- Dhanalakshmi Srinivasan Engineering College, Perambalur
- Rathinam Technical Campus of Technology, Coimbatore
- Paavai Engineering College
- Nandha College of Technology, Erode

== See also ==
- List of Tamil Nadu Government educational institutions
- List of Tamil Nadu Government Engineering Colleges
