= List of colleges affiliated to the Anna University =

Anna University in Tamil Nadu, India has many affiliated institutions. For the full list, see below

== Anna University's Departments and University Colleges ==
=== University Departments ===
Institution	District
University Departments of Anna University Chennai - CEG Campus	Chennai
University Departments of Anna University Chennai - ACT Campus	Chennai
School of Architecture and Planning	Chennai
University Departments of Anna University Chennai - MIT Campus	Chengalpattu
Annamalai University Faculty of Engineering and Technology	Cuddalore

=== Government Colleges ===
Institution	District
Thanthai Periyar Government Institute of Technology	Vellore
Government College of Technology (Autonomous)	Coimbatore
Government College of Engineering	Dharmapuri
Government College of Engineering (Autonomous)	Krishnagiri
Government College of Engineering (Autonomous)	Salem
Government College of Engineering (Formerly Institute of Road and Transport Technology)	Erode
Government College of Engineering	Thanjavur
Government College of Engineering	Tiruchirappalli
Government College of Engineering (Autonomous)	Tirunelveli
Government College of Engineering	Theni
Alagappa Chettiar Government College of Engineering and Technology (Autonomous)	Sivagangai

=== Government Aided Colleges ===
Institution	District
PSG College of Technology (Autonomous)	Coimbatore
Coimbatore Institute of Technology (Autonomous)	Coimbatore
Thiagarajar College of Engineering (Autonomous)	Madurai

=== Central Institutes ===
Institution	District
Central Institute of Petrochemicals Engineering and Technology (Formerly Central Institute of Plastics Engineering and Technology) (CIPET)	Chennai
Indian Institute of Handloom Technology	Salem
Central Electrochemical Research Institute (CECRI)	Sivagangai

=== Constituent Colleges ===
Institution	District
University College of Engineering	Villupuram
University College of Engineering	Villupuram
University College of Engineering	Thiruvannamalai
University College of Engineering	Kancheepuram
Anna University Regional Campus - Coimbatore	Coimbatore
University College of Engineering	Tiruchirappalli
University College of Engineering	Ariyalur
University College of Engineering	Nagapattinam
University College of Engineering	Cuddalore
University College of Engineering	Thanjavur
Anna University Regional Campus - Tirunelveli	Tirunelveli
University College of Engineering	Kanyakumari
University V.O.C. College of Engineering	Thoothukudi
Anna University Regional Campus - Madurai	Madurai
University College of Engineering	Ramanathapuram
University College of Engineering	Dindigul

== Self - Financing Colleges affiliated to Anna University ==
College Name	District
Aalim Muhammed Salegh College of Engineering (Autonomous)	Chennai
Bhajarang Engineering College	Thiruvallur
Jaya Engineering College	Chennai
Jaya Institute of Technology	Thiruvallur
Prathyusha Engineering College (Autonomous)	Thiruvallur
R M D Engineering College (Autonomous)	Thiruvallur
R M K Engineering College (Autonomous)	Thiruvallur
S A Engineering College (Autonomous)	Chennai
Sri Ram Engineering College	Thiruvallur
Sri Venkateswara College of Engineering and Technology (Autonomous)	Thiruvallur
Vel Tech Multi Tech Dr. Rangarajan Dr. Sakunthala Engineering College (Autonomous)	Chennai
Velammal Engineering College (Autonomous)	Chennai
Sri Venkateswara Institute of Science and Technology	Thiruvallur
Vel Tech High Tech Dr. Rangarajan Dr. Sakunthala Engineering College (Autonomous)	Chennai
Gojan School of Business and Technology (Autonomous)	Chennai
J N N Institute of Engineering (Autonomous)	Thiruvallur
St. Peters College of Engineering and Technology (Autonomous)	Chennai
R M K College of Engineering and Technology (Autonomous)	Thiruvallur
Nellai Nadar College of Engineering and Technology	Chennai
Annai Mira College of Engineering and Technology	Ranipet
Jeppiaar Institute of Technology (Autonomous)	Kancheepuram
Sri Jayaram Institute of Engineering and Technology	Thiruvallur
D M I College of Engineering (Autonomous)	Chennai
Kings Engineering College (Autonomous)	Kancheepuram
Panimalar Engineering College (Autonomous)	Chennai
Rajalakshmi Engineering College (Autonomous)	Kancheepuram
Rajiv Gandhi College of Engineering	Kancheepuram
S K R Engineering College	Chennai
Saveetha Engineering College (Autonomous)	Kancheepuram
Sree Sastha Institute of Engineering and Technology	Chennai
Sri Muthukumaran Institute of Technology (Autonomous)	Chennai
Sri Venkateswara College of Engineering (Autonomous)	Kancheepuram
Jaya College of Engineering and Technology	Chennai
P B College of Engineering	Kancheepuram
Loyola Institute of Technology (Autonomous)	Chennai
P T Lee Chengalvaraya Naicker College of Engineering and Technology	Kancheepuram
Alpha College of Engineering	Chennai
Indira Institute of Engineering and Technology	Thiruvallur
Apollo Engineering College	Kancheepuram
A R M College of Engineering and Technology	Chengalpattu
Adhi College of Engineering and Technology (Autonomous)	Kancheepuram
Jei Mathaajee College of Engineering	Kancheepuram
Velammal Institute of Technology	Thiruvallur
G R T Institute of Engineering and Technology (Autonomous)	Thiruvallur
T J S Engineering College (Autonomous)	Thiruvallur
St. Lourdes Engineering College (Formerly Madha Institute of Engineering and Technology)	Chennai
Mohammed Sathak A J College of Engineering and Architecture (Autonomous)	Chengalpattu
Anand Institute of Higher Technology (Autonomous)	Chengalpattu
Easwari Engineering College (Autonomous)	Chennai
Jeppiar Engineering College (Autonomous)	Chennai
Jerusalem College of Engineering (Autonomous)	Chennai
Meenakshi Sundararajan Engineering College (Autonomous)	Chennai
Misrimal Navajee Munoth Jain Engineering College	Chennai
K C G College of Technology (Autonomous)	Chennai
Agni College of Technology (Autonomous)	Chengalpattu
St. Josephs College of Engineering (Autonomous)	Chennai
Thangavelu Engineering College	Chennai
Dhanalakshmi Srinivasan College of Engineering and Technology (Autonomous)	Chennai
St. Joseph College of Engineering	Kancheepuram
Shikshaa Institute of Advanced Technologies (formerly Vi Institute of Technology)	Kancheepuram
Sri Krishna Institute of Technology	Chennai
Chennai Institute of Technology (Autonomous)	Chennai
Adhiparasakthi Engineering College (Autonomous)	Chengalpattu
Annai Teresa College of Engineering	Kallakkurichi
Dhanalakshmi College of Engineering (Autonomous)	Chennai
G K M College of Engineering and Technology	Chennai
I F E T College of Engineering (Autonomous)	Villupuram
Madha Engineering College (Autonomous)	Chennai
Mailam Engineering College	Villupuram
Sri Venkateswaraa College of Technology (Autonomous)	Kanchipuram
Prince Shri Venkateshwara Padmavathy Engineering College (Autonomous)	Chennai
T S M Jain College of Technology	Kallakurichi
Jaya Sakthi Engineering College	Chennai
Sri Sai Ram Engineering College (Autonomous)	Chennai
Tagore Engineering College	Chennai
V R S College of Engineering and Technology	Villupuram
SRM Valliammai Engineering College (Autonomous)	Chennai
Asan Memorial College of Engineering and Technology	Chengalpattu
Dhaanish Chennai College of Engineering (Autonomous)	Chennai
Sri Ramanujar Engineering College	Chennai
Sri Krishna Engineering College	Chennai
E. S. College of Engineering and Technology	Villupuram
Maha Bharathi Engineering College	Kallakurichi
New Prince Shri Bhavani College of Engineering and Technology (Autonomous)	Chennai
Rajalakshmi Institute of Technology (Autonomous)	Kancheepuram
Surya Group of Institutions	Villupuram
A R Engineering College	Villupuram
Rrase College of Engineering	Kancheepuram
Sree Krishna College of Engineering	Vellore
A K T Memorial College of Engineering and Technology	Kallakurichi
Prince Dr. K Vasudevan College of Engineering and Technology (Autonomous)	Chennai
R.M.Engineering College (formerly Chendu College of Engineering and Technology)	Kanchipuram
Sri Rangapoopathi College of Engineering (Autonomous)	Villupuram
Saraswathy College of Engineering and Technology	Villupuram
Loyola ICAM College of Engineering and Technology (Autonomous)	Chennai
PERI Institute of Technology (Autonomous)	Chennai
Adhiparasakthi College of Engineering	Ranipet
Arulmigu Meenakshi Amman College of Engineering	Thiruvannamalai
Arunai Engineering College (Autonomous)	Thiruvannamalai
C Abdul Hakeem College of Engineering and Technology	Ranipet
Ganadipathy Tulsis Jain Engineering College	Vellore
Meenakshi College of Engineering	Chennai
Priyadarshini Engineering College	Thiruppathur
S K P Engineering College	Thiruvannamalai
Sri Balaji Chockalingam Engineering College	Thiruvannamalai
Thirumalai Engineering College	Kancheepuram
Thiruvalluvar College of Engineering and Technology	Thiruvannamalai
Bharathidasan Engineering College	Thiruppathur
Kingston Engineering College (Autonomous)	Vellore
Global Institute of Engineering and Technology (Autonomous)	Ranipet
Annamalaiar College of Engineering	Thiruvannamalai
Podhigai College of Engineering and Technology	Tirupattur
Sri Krishna College of Engineering	Ranipet
Idhaya Engineering College for Women	Kallakkurichi
Sri Shanmugha College of Engineering and Technology (Autonomous)	Salem
N S N College of Engineering and Technology	Karur
Rathinam Technical Campus (Autonomous)	Coimbatore
Asian College of Engineering and Technology (Autonomous)	Coimbatore
Ganesh College of Engineering (Autonomous)	Salem
Sri Ranganathar Institute of Engineering and Technology (Autonomous)	Coimbatore
Hindusthan College of Technology (Autonomous)	Salem
Shree Sathyam College of Engineering and Technology (Autonomous)	Salem
AVS College of Technology	Salem
Dhaanish Ahmed Institute of Technology (Autonomous)	Coimbatore
Jairupaa College of Engineering	Tiruppur
Pollachi Institute of Engineering and Technology	Coimbatore
Arulmurugan College of Engineering	Karur
V S B College of Engineering Technical Campus (Autonomous)	Coimbatore
Suguna College of Engineering	Coimbatore
Arjun College of Technology (Autonomous)	Coimbatore
Vishnu Lakshmi College of Engineering and Technology	Coimbatore
PSG Institute of Technology and Applied Research (Autonomous)	Coimbatore
Cheran College of Technology	Tiruppur
Adhiyamaan College of Engineering (Autonomous)	Krishnagiri
Annai Mathammal Sheela Engineering College	Namakkal
K S Rangasamy College of Technology (Autonomous)	Namakkal
M Kumarasamy College of Engineering (Autonomous)	Karur
Mahendra Engineering College (Autonomous)	Namakkal
Muthayammal Engineering College (Autonomous)	Namakkal
Paavai Engineering College (Autonomous)	Namakkal
P G P College of Engineering and Technology (Autonomous)	Namakkal
K S R College of Engineering (Autonomous)	Namakkal
S S M College of Engineering (Autonomous)	Namakkal
Sapthagiri College of Engineering	Dharmapuri
Sengunthar Engineering College (Autonomous)	Namakkal
Sona College of Technology (Autonomous)	Salem
Vivekanandha College of Engineering for Women (Autonomous)	Namakkal
Er. Perumal Manimekalai College of Engineering (Autonomous)	Krishnagiri
V S B Engineering College (Autonomous)	Karur
Mahendra College of Engineering (Autonomous)	Salem
Gnanamani College of Technology (Autonomous)	Namakkal
The Kavery Engineering College (Autonomous)	Salem
Selvam College of Technology (Autonomous)	Namakkal
Paavai College of Engineering	Namakkal
Chettinad College of Engineering and Technology	Karur
Mahendra Institute of Technology (Autonomous)	Namakkal
Vidyaa Vikas College of Engineering and Technology (Autonomous)	Namakkal
Excel Engineering College (Autonomous)	Namakkal
CMS College of Engineering (Autonomous)	Namakkal
A V S Engineering College (Autonomous)	Salem
Mahendra Engineering College for Women (Autonomous)	Namakkal
R P Sarathy Institute of Technology (Autonomous)	Salem
Jayalakshmi Institute of Technology	Dharmapuri
Varuvan Vadivelan Institute of Technology	Dharmapuri
P S V College of Engineeering and Technology (Autonomous)	Krishnagiri
Bharathiyar Institute of Engineering for Women (Autonomous)	Salem
Tagore Institute of Engineering and Technology	Salem
J K K Nataraja College of Engineering and Technology (Autonomous)	Namakkal
Annapoorana Engineering College (Autonomous)	Salem
Christ The King Engineering College	Coimbatore
Jai Shriram Engineering College (Autonomous)	Tiruppur
AL-Ameen Engineering College (Autonomous)	Erode
Knowledge Institute of Technology (Autonomous)	Salem
Kangeyam Institute of Technology (Autonomous)	Tiruppur
V S A Group of Institutions	Salem
Salem College of Engineering and Technology	Salem
Sree Sakthi Engineering College (Autonomous)	Coimbatore
Shreenivasa Engineering College (Autonomous)	Dharmapuri
Bannari Amman Institute of Technology (Autonomous)	Erode
Coimbatore Institute of Engineering and Technology (Autonomous)	Coimbatore
CSI College of Engineering (Autonomous)	Nilgiris
Dr. Mahalingam College of Engineering and Technology (Autonomous)	Coimbatore
Erode Sengunthar Engineering College (Autonomous)	Erode
Hindusthan College of Engineering and Technology (Autonomous)	Coimbatore
Karpagam College of Engineering (Autonomous)	Coimbatore
Kongu Engineering College (Autonomous)	Erode
Kumaraguru College of Technology (Autonomous)	Coimbatore
M P Nachimuthu M Jaganathan Engineering College (Autonomous)	Erode
Nandha Engineering College (Autonomous)	Erode
Park College of Engineering and Technology (Autonomous)	Coimbatore
Sasurie College of Engineering (Autonomous)	Tiruppur
Sri Krishna College of Engineering and Technology (Autonomous)	Coimbatore
Sri Ramakrishna Engineering College (Autonomous)	Coimbatore
Tamilnadu College of Engineering	Coimbatore
Velalar College of Engineering and Technology (Autonomous)	Erode
Sri Ramakrishna Institute of Technology (Autonomous)	Coimbatore
SNS College of Technology (Autonomous)	Coimbatore
Sri Shakthi Institute of Engineering and Technology (Autonomous)	Coimbatore
Nehru Institute of Engineering and Technology (Autonomous)	Coimbatore
R V S College of Engineering and Technology (Autonomous)	Coimbatore
Info Institute of Engineering (Autonomous)	Coimbatore
Angel College of Engineering and Technology	Tirupur
Dr. N G P Institute of Technology (Autonomous)	Coimbatore
Sri Sai Ranganathan Engineering College (Autonomous)	Coimbatore
Sri Eshwar College of Engineering (Autonomous)	Coimbatore
Hindusthan Institute of Technology (Autonomous)	Coimbatore
P A College of Engineering and Technology (Autonomous)	Coimbatore
Dhanalakshmi Srinivasan College of Engineering (CBE) (Autonomous)	Coimbatore
Adithya Institute of Technology (Autonomous)	Coimbatore
Kathir College of Engineering (Autonomous)	Coimbatore
Shree Venkateshwara Hi-Tech Engineering College (Autonomous)	Erode
Surya Engineering College (Autonomous)	Erode
Easa College of Engineering and Technology (Autonomous)	Coimbatore
KIT - Kalaignar Karunanidhi Institute of Technology (Autonomous)	Coimbatore
KGISL Institute of Technology (Autonomous)	Coimbatore
Nandha College of Technology (Autonomous)	Erode
PPG Institute of Technology (Autonomous)	Coimbatore
Nehru Institute of Technology (Autonomous)	Coimbatore
J K K Munirajah College of Technology (Autonomous)	Erode
United Institute of Technology (Autonomous)	Coimbatore
Jansons Institute of Technology (Autonomous)	Coimbatore
Akshaya College of Engineering and Technology (Autonomous)	Coimbatore
K P R Institute of Engineering and Technology (Autonomous)	Coimbatore
SRG Engineering College	Namakkal
Park College of Technology	Coimbatore
JCT College of Engineering and Technology (Autonomous)	Coimbatore
Studyworld College of Engineering	Coimbatore
C M S College of Engineering and Technology (Autonomous)	Coimbatore
R V S Institute of Technology - Coimbatore (Autonomous)	Coimbatore
Krishnasamy College of Engineering and Technology	Cuddalore
C K College of Engineering and Technology (Autonomous)	Cuddalore
Sri Ramakrishna College of Engineering (Autonomous)	Perambalur
K S K College of Engineering and Technology	Thanjavur
Arifa Institute of Technology(Formly Haji Sheik Ismail Engineering College)	Nagapattinam
Nelliandavar Institute of Technology (Autonomous)	Ariyalur
K Ramakrishnan College of Technology (Autonomous)	Tiruchirappalli
Sir Issac Newton College of Engineering and Technology (Autonomous)	Nagapattinam
OASYS Institute of Technology	Tiruchirappalli
M.A.M. School of Engineering (Autonomous)	Tiruchirappalli
SRM TRP Engineering College (Autonomous)	Tiruchirappalli
A V C College of Engineering	Mayiladuthurai
Anjalai Ammal Mahalingam Engineering College	Thiruvarur
Arasu Engineering College	Thanjavur
Dhanalakshmi Srinivasan Engineering College (Autonomous)	Perambalur
E G S Pillay Engineering College (Autonomous)	Nagapattinam
J J College of Engineering and Technology (Autonomous)	Thiruchirappalli
MAM College of Engineering	Tiruchirappalli
M I E T Engineering College (Autonomous)	Tiruchirappalli
Mookambigai College of Engineering	Pudukkottai
Oxford Engineering College	Tiruchirappalli
SRM Bharathidasan College of Engineering and Technology	Tiruchirappalli
Roever Engineering College (Autonomous)	Perambalur
Saranathan College of Engineering (Autonomous)	Tiruchirappalli
Trichy Engineering College	Tiruchirappalli
A R J College of Engineering and Technology	Thiruvarur
Tittagudi Sengunthar Engineering College (Formerly Dr.Navalar Nedunchezhiyan College of Engineering)	Cuddalore
St. Joseph s College of Engineering and Technology	Thanjavur
Kongunadu College of Engineering and Technology (Autonomous)	Tiruchirappalli
M.A.M. College of Engineering and Technology	Tiruchirappalli
K Ramakrishnan College of Engineering (Autonomous)	Tiruchirappalli
Indra Ganesan College of Engineering (Autonomous)	Tiruchirappalli
Parisutham Institute of Technology and Science (Autonomous)	Thanjavur
CARE College of Engineering (Formerly C.A.R.E Group of Institutions) (Autonomous)	Tiruchirappalli
M R K Institute of Technology (Autonomous)	Cuddalore
Shivani Engineering College	Tiruchirappalli
Imayam College of Engineering	Tiruchirappalli
Mother Terasa College of Engineering and Technology	Pudukkottai
Vandayar Engineering College	Thanjavur
Annai College of Engineering and Technology	Thanjavur
Sri Bharathi Engineering College for Women	Pudukkottai
Mahath Amma Institute of Engineering and Technology (MIET)	Pudukkottai
Meenakshi Ramaswamy Engineering College	Ariyalur
St. Anne s College of Engineering and Technology	Cuddalore
Kings College of Engineering (Autonomous)	Pudukkottai
Mount Zion College of Engineering and Technology (Autonomous)	Pudukkottai
Shanmuganathan Engineering College	Pudukkottai
Sudharsan Engineering College (Autonomous)	Pudukkottai
M N S K College of Engineering	Pudukkottai
Chendhuran College of Engineering and Technology (Autonomous)	Pudukkottai
Thamirabharani Engineering College (Autonomous)	Tirunelveli
Rohini College of Engineering & Technology (Autonomous)	Kanyakumari
Stella Mary s College of Engineering (Autonomous)	Kanyakumari
Universal College of Engineering and Technology	Tirunelveli
Renganayagi Varatharaj College of Engineering	Virudhunagar
Arunachala Hitech Engineering College (formerly Lourdes Mount College of Engineering and Technology)	Kanyakumari
Ramco Institute of Technology (Autonomous)	Virudhunagar
AAA College of Engineering and Technology (Autonomous)	Virudhunagar
Good Shepherd College of Engineering and Technology	Kanyakumari
V V College of Engineering	Thoothukudi
Sethu Institute of Technology (Autonomous)	Virudhunagar
Sun College of Engineering and Technology	Kanyakumari
MAR Ephraem College of Engineering & Technology	Kanyakumari
M E T Engineering College	Kanyakumari
Grace College of Engineering	Thoothukudi
Immanuel Arasar J.J. College of Engineering	Kanyakumari
St. Mother Theresa Engineering College	Thoothukudi
Holy Cross Engineering College	Thoothukudi
Sivaji College of Engineering and Technology	Kanyakumari
Unnamalai Institute of Technology (Autonomous)	Thoothukudi
Satyam College of Engineering and Technology	Kanyakumari
Arunachala College of Engineering for Women	Kanyakumari
D M I Engineering College	Kanyakumari
PSN Institute of Technology and Science (Autonomous)	Tirunelveli
C S I Institute of Technology	Kanyakumari
CAPE Institute of Technology	Tirunelveli
Dr. Sivanthi Aditanar College of Engineering	Thoothukudi
Francis Xavier Engineering College (Autonomous)	Tirunelveli
Jayamatha Engineering College	Kanyakumari
Jayaraj Annapackiam CSI College of Engineering	Thoothukudi
Kamaraj College of Engineering and Technology (Autonomous)	Virudhunagar
Mepco Schlenk Engineering College (Autonomous)	Virudhunagar
Nellai College of Engineering (Formerly National College of Engineering)	Tirunelveli
National Engineering College (Autonomous)	Thoothukudi
PSN College of Engineering and Technology (Autonomous)	Tirunelveli
P S R Engineering College (Autonomous)	Virudhunagar
PET Engineering College	Tirunelveli
S Veerasamy Chettiar College of Engineering and Technology	Tenkasi
Sardar Raja College of Engineering	Tenkasi
SCAD College of Engineering and Technology	Tirunelveli
Sree Sowdambika College of Engineering (Autonomous)	Virudhunagar
St. Xavier s Catholic College Of Engineering (Autonomous)	Kanyakumari
Dr. G U Pope College of Engineering	Thoothukudi
Infant Jesus College of Engineering	Thoothukudi
Narayanaguru College of Engineering	Kanyakumari
Udaya School of Engineering	Kanyakumari
Einstein College of Engineering	Tirunelveli
Ponjesly College of Engineering	Kanyakumari
Vins Christian College of Engineering	Kanyakumari
Lord Jegannath College of Engineering and Technology	Kanyakumari
PSN Engineering College	Tirunelveli
Bethlahem Institute of Engineering	Kanyakumari
Loyola Institute of Technology and Science	Kanyakumari
J P College of Engineering	Tenkasi
Sri Vidya College of Engineering and Technology	Virudhunagar
Mahakavi Bharathiyar College of Engineering and Technology	Tenkasi
Annai Vailankanni College of Engineering	Kanyakumari
Sri Raajaraajan College of Engineering & Technology (Autonomous)	Sivagangai
SSM Institute of Engineering and Technology (Autonomous)	Dindigul
Vaigai College of Engineering	Madurai
Karaikudi Institute of Technology and Karaikudi Institute of Management	Sivagangai
Mangayarkarasi College of Engineering	Madurai
Christian College of Engineering and Technology	Dindigul
N P R College of Engineering and Technology (Autonomous)	Dindigul
SRM Madurai College for Engineering and Technology	Sivagangai
RVS School of Engineering and Technology (Formerly R V S Educational Trust's Group of Institutions)	Dindigul
Nadar Saraswathi College of Engineering and Technology	Theni
Bharath Niketan Engineering College	Theni
K L N College of Engineering (Autonomous)	Sivagangai
Mohamed Sathak Engineering College (Autonomous)	Ramanathapuram
P S N A College of Engineering and Technology (Autonomous)	Dindigul
PTR College of Engineering and Technology	Madurai
Pandian Saraswathi Yadav Engineering College (Autonomous)	Sivagangai
R V S College of Engineering (Autonomous)	Dindigul
Solamalai College of Engineering (Autonomous)	Madurai
SACS-M A V M M Engineering College	Madurai
St. Michael College of Engineering and Technology (Autonomous)	Sivagangai
Syed Ammal Engineering College (Autonomous)	Ramanathapuram
Ganapathy Chettiar College of Engineering and Technology	Ramanathapuram
SBM College of Engineering and Technology	Dindigul
Fatima Michael College of Engineering and Technology (Autonomous)	Madurai
Ultra College of Engineering and Technology	Madurai
Velammal College of Engineering and Technology (Autonomous)	Madurai
Theni Kammavar Sangam College of Technology	Theni
Latha Mathavan Engineering College	Madurai
Sasi Creative School of Archiecture	Coimbatore
Mahalakshmi Tech Campus	Chennai
Marthandam College of Engineering & Technology	Kanyakumari
Noorul Islam College of Engineering and Technology	Kanyakumari
Madras Engineering College	Kanchipuram
G.T.N College of Technology	Dindigul
Jamal Mohamed College of Engineering	Dindigul
Hindusthan College of Engineering	Erode
Dhanalakshmi Srinivasan College of Engineering and Technology (Off Campus - Autonomous)	Tiruppur
S.Thangapazham College of Engineering and Technology	Tenkasi
Rajalakshmi Engineering College (Off Campus - Autonomous)	Chennai
Sri Vignesh College of Engineering and Technology	Tiruchirappalli
Ayyappa Engineering College	Cuddalore
Sree Krishna College of Engineering and Technology	Kanyakumari
Aishwarya College of Engineering and Technology	Erode
Maria College of Engineering and Technology	Kanyakumari
