= List of institutions of higher education in Tamil Nadu =

Tamil Nadu has both private and public universities, which either the government of India or the government of Tamil Nadu owns and manages. whereas various bodies and societies manage the private universities. Here is a list of research organizations and higher educational institutions in the state.

== Institutes of National Importance ==
The government of India gives the status of Institute of National Importance (INI) to the top institutes in India through the act of Parliament. An institute with the status of INI plays a crucial role in teaching and developing highly skilled students in the state or country. The government funds, recognizes, and supervises such institutions to develop learning centers in academics and research.

=== List of institutes of national importance ===
Name	Location	Date of establishment	Specialization
All India Institute of Medical Sciences, Madurai	Madurai	2021	Medicine
Indian Institute of Information Technology, Design and Manufacturing, Kancheepuram	Chennai	2007	IT Enabled Design and Manufacturing
Indian Institute of Information Technology, Tiruchirappalli	Tiruchirappalli	2013	Engineering and Technology
Indian Institute of Management, Tiruchirappalli	Tiruchirappalli	4 January 2011	Management
Indian Institute of Technology, Madras	Chennai	1959	Multidisciplinary (STEM)
Kalakshetra Foundation	Chennai	January 1936	Classical Arts
National Institute of Food Technology, Entrepreneurship and Management, Thanjavur	Thanjavur	1967	Food Technology, Entrepreneurship and Management
National Institute of Technology, Tiruchirappalli	Tiruchirappalli	1964	Multidisciplinary (STEM)
Rajiv Gandhi National Institute of Youth Development	Sriperumbudur	1993	Multidisciplinary

== Universities ==
The higher education system in India includes both private and public universities. Universities in India are recognized by the University Grants Commission (UGC), which draws its power from the University Grants Commission Act, 1956.

The types of universities include:

	Universities in India
Central Universities	State Universities	Deemed to be Universities	State Private Universities

=== List of central universities ===
Name	Location	Date of establishment	Specialization	Section	
Name	Location	Date of establishment	Specialization	2(f)	12(B)
Central University of Tamil Nadu	Tiruvarur	30 September 2009	Multidisciplinary	Yes	Yes
Indian Maritime University	Chennai	14 November 2008	Marine Sciences	Yes	Yes

=== List of state universities ===
Name	Location	Date of establishment	Specialization	Section	
Name	Location	Date of establishment	Specialization	2(f)	12(B)
Alagappa University	Karaikudi	9 May 1985	Multidisciplinary	Yes	Yes
Anna University	Chennai	4 September 1978	Engineering and Technology	Yes	Yes
Annamalai University	Annamalainagar	1 January 1929	Multidisciplinary	Yes	Yes
Bharathiar University	Coimbatore	February 1982	Multidisciplinary	Yes	Yes
Bharathidasan University	Tiruchirappalli	February 1982	Multidisciplinary	Yes	Yes
Madurai Kamaraj University	Madurai	1966	Multidisciplinary	Yes	Yes
Manonmaniam Sundaranar University	Tirunelveli	7 September 1990	Multidisciplinary	Yes	Yes
Mother Teresa Women's University	Kodaikanal	1984	Women's University	Yes	Yes
Periyar University	Salem	17 September 1997	Multidisciplinary	Yes	Yes
Tamil Nadu Agricultural University	Coimbatore	1971	Agriculture	Yes	Yes
Tamil Nadu Dr. J. Jayalalithaa Fisheries University	Nagapattinam	2012	Aquaculture, and Fisheries	Yes	Yes
Tamil Nadu National Law University	Tiruchirappalli	2012	Legal	Yes	Yes
Tamil Nadu Open University	Chennai	2002	Distance Education	Yes	Yes
Tamil Nadu Physical Education and Sports University	Chennai	15 September 2005	Physical Education, and Sports	Yes	No
Tamil Nadu Teachers Education University	Chennai	1 July 2008	Teachers Education	Yes	Yes
Tamil Nadu Veterinary and Animal Sciences University	Chennai	20 September 1989	Veterinary, and Animal Sciences	Yes	Yes
Tamil University	Thanjavur	15 September 1981	Tamil	Yes	Yes
The Tamil Nadu Dr. Ambedkar Law University	Chennai	20 September 1997	Legal	Yes	Yes
The Tamil Nadu Dr. J. Jayalalithaa Music and Fine Arts University	Chennai	14 November 2013	Music, and Fine Arts	Yes	No
The Tamil Nadu Dr. M.G.R. Medical University	Chennai	1989	Medical	Yes	Yes
Thiruvalluvar University	Vellore	October 2002	Multidisciplinary	Yes	Yes
University of Madras	Chennai	5 September 1857	Multidisciplinary	Yes	Yes

=== List of deemed to be universities ===
Name	Location	Date of establishment	Specialization	Section	
Name	Location	Date of establishment	Specialization	III	12(B)
AMET University	Kanathur	21 August 2007	Multidisciplinary	Yes	No
Amrita Vishwa Vidyapeetham	Coimbatore	13 January 2003	Multidisciplinary	Yes	No
Avinashilingam Institute for Home Science and Higher Education for Women	Coimbatore	8 June 1988	Women only	Yes	Yes
B.S. Abdur Rahman Crescent Institute of Science and Technology	Chennai	16 December 2008	Multidisciplinary	Yes	No
Bharath Institute of Higher Education and Research	Chennai	4 July 2002	Multidisciplinary	Yes	No
Chennai Mathematical Institute	Kelambakkam	15 December 2006	Mathematics	Yes	No
Chettinad Academy of Research and Education	Kelambakkam	4 August 2008	Multidisciplinary	Yes	Yes
Dr. M.G.R. Educational and Research Institute	Chennai	21 January 2003	Multidisciplinary	Yes	No
Hindustan Institute of Technology and Science	Chennai	5 May 2008	Multidisciplinary	Yes	No
Kalasalingam Academy of Research and Education	Krishnankoil	20 October 2006	Multidisciplinary	Yes	No
Karpagam Academy of Higher Education	Coimbatore	25 August 2008	Multidisciplinary	Yes	No
Karunya Institute of Technology and Sciences	Coimbatore	23 June 2004	Multidisciplinary	Yes	No
Meenakshi Academy of Higher Education and Research	Chennai	31 March 2004	Multidisciplinary	Yes	No
Noorul Islam Centre for Higher Education	Kumaracoil	8 December 2008	Multidisciplinary	Yes	No
Periyar Maniammai Institute of Science & Technology	Thanjavur	17 August 2007	Multidisciplinary	Yes	No
Ponnaiyah Ramajayam Institute of Science and Technology (PRIST)	Thanjavur	4 January 2008	Multidisciplinary	Yes	No
Sathyabama Institute of Science and Technology	Chennai	16 July 2001	Multidisciplinary	Yes	Yes
Saveetha Institute of Medical And Technical Sciences (SIMATS)	Chennai	18 March 2005	Multidisciplinary	Yes	Yes
Shanmugha Arts, Science, Technology and Research Academy (SASTRA)	Thanjavur	26 April 2001	Multidisciplinary	Yes	Yes
Sri Chandrasekharendra Saraswathi Viswa Mahavidyalaya (SCSVMV)	Kancheepuram	26 May 1993	Multidisciplinary	Yes	No
Sri Ramachandra Institute of Higher Education and Research	Chennai	29 September 1994	Multidisciplinary	Yes	Yes
SRM Institute of Science and Technology	Kattankulathur	2 August 2002	Multidisciplinary	Yes	Yes
St. Peter's Institute of Higher Education and Research	Chennai	26 May 2008	Multidisciplinary	Yes	No
The Gandhigram Rural Institute	Dindigul	3 August 1976	Multidisciplinary	Yes	Yes
Vel Tech Rangarajan Dr. Sagunthala R&D Institute of Science and Technology	Chennai	15 October 2008	Multidisciplinary	Yes	No
Vellore Institute of Technology (VIT)	Vellore	19 June 2001	Multidisciplinary	Yes	No
Vels Institute of Science, Technology & Advanced Studies (VISTAS)	Chennai	4 June 2008	Multidisciplinary	Yes	No
Vinayaka Mission's Research Foundation	Salem	1 March 2001	Multidisciplinary	Yes	No

=== List of state private universities ===
Name	Location	Date of establishment	Specialization	Section	
Name	Location	Date of establishment	Specialization	2(f)	12(B)
Dhanalakshmi Srinivasan University	Tiruchirappalli	20 January 2021	Multidisciplinary	Yes	No
Shiv Nadar University	Kalavakkam	8 February 2021	Multidisciplinary	Yes	No
St. Joseph University	Tindivanam	26 February 2021	Multidisciplinary	Yes	No
Sri Venkateswaraa University	Thoothukudi	26 February 2021	Multidisciplinary	Yes	No
NMV University	Aruppukottai	26 February 2021	Multidisciplinary	Yes	No
Jeppiaar University	Chennai	26 February 2021	Multidisciplinary	Yes	No
Sai University	Chennai	28 April 2021	Multidisciplinary	Yes	No
Takshashila University, Tamilnadu	Tindivanam	27 May 2022	Multidisciplinary	Yes	No
Joy University, Tamilnadu	Tirunelveli	26 July 2022	Multidisciplinary	Yes	No

== Constituent colleges of universities ==
Name of the College	Category	Administering University	Location			
Agricultural College And Research Institute, Chettinad	Agriculture	Tamil Nadu Agricultural University	Sivaganga			
Agricultural College And Research Institute, Coimbatore	Agriculture	Tamil Nadu Agricultural University	Coimbatore			
Agricultural College And Research Institute, Karur	Agriculture	Tamil Nadu Agricultural University	Karur			
Agricultural College And Research Institute, Keezhvelur	Agriculture	Tamil Nadu Agricultural University	Nagapattinam			
Agricultural College And Research Institute, Kudumiyanmalai	Agriculture	Tamil Nadu Agricultural University	Pudukottai			
Agricultural College And Research Institute, Madurai	Agriculture	Tamil Nadu Agricultural University	Madurai			
Agricultural College And Research Institute, Vazhavachanur	Agriculture	Tamil Nadu Agricultural University	Tiruvannamalai			
Agricultural Engineering College And Research Institute, Coimbatore	Agriculture engineering	Tamil Nadu Agricultural University	Coimbatore			
Agricultural Engineering College And Research Institute, Kumulur	Agriculture engineering	Tamil Nadu Agricultural University	Tiruchirapalli			
Anbil Dharmalingam Agricultural College and Research Institute	Agriculture	Tamil Nadu Agricultural University	Tiruchirapalli			
College of Engineering, Guindy	Engineering	Anna University	Guindy, Chennai			
Community Science College And Research Institute, Madurai	Agriculture(food science)	Tamil Nadu Agricultural University	Madurai			
Dr. M S Swaminathan Agricultural College And Research Institute, Eachangottai	Agriculture	Tamil Nadu Agricultural University	Thanjavur			
Forestry College And Research Institute, Mettupalayam	Forestry	Tamil Nadu Agricultural University	Coimbatore			
Government College of Engineering, Tirunelveli	Engineering	Anna University	Tirunelveli			
Government College of Engineering(IRTT), Erode	Engineering	Anna University	Erode			
Horticultural College And Research Institute, Coimbatore	Agriculture	Tamil Nadu Agricultural University	Coimbatore			
Horticultural College And Research Institute, Paiyur	Horticulture	Tamil Nadu Agricultural University	Krishnagiri			
Horticultural College And Research Institute, Periyakulam	Horticulture	Tamil Nadu Agricultural University	Theni			
Horticultural College And Research Institute for Women, Navalur kuttapattu	Horticulture	Tamil Nadu Agricultural University	Tiruchirapalli			
Madras Institute of Technology	Engineering	Anna University	Chromepet, Chennai			
School of Post Graduate Studies, Coimbatore	Post graduate studies	Tamil Nadu Agricultural University	Coimbatore			
University college of engineering Kanchipuram	Engineering	Anna University	Kanchipuram			
V.O Chidambaram Agricultural College And Research Institute, Killikulam	Agriculture	Tamil Nadu Agricultural University	Tirunelveli			
Madras Medical College and Rajiv Gandhi General Hospital, Broadway	Allopathic medicine	Dr. M.G.R Medical University	Chennai			
Stanley Medical College and Hospital, Washermanpet	Allopathic medicine	Dr. M.G.R Medical University	Chennai			
Kilpauk Medical College and Hospital	Kilpauk	Chennai	1960	150	Allopathy	
04	Government Medical College (Omandurar Government Estate) and Tamil Nadu Government Multi Super Speciality Hospital	Triplicane	Chennai	2015	100	Allopathy
05	Government Chengalpattu Medical College and Hospital	Chengalpattu	Kanchipuram	1965	100	Allopathy
06	Government Dharmapuri Medical College and Hospital	Dharmapuri	Dharmapuri	2008	100	Allopathy
07	Government Madurai Medical College and Rajaji Hospital	Madurai	Madurai	1954	250	Allopathy
08	K.A.P.Viswanatham Government Medical College and Hospital	Trichy	Trichy	1997	150	Allopathy
09	Government Thanjavur Medical College and Hospital	Thanjavur	Thanjavur	1958	150	Allopathy
10	Government Mohan Kumaramangalam Medical College and Hospital	Salem	Salem	1986	100	Allopathy
11	Government Thoothukudi Medical College and Hospital	Thoothukudi	Thoothukudi	2001	150	Allopathy
12	Kanyakumari Government Medical College and Hospital	Nagercoil	Kanyakumari	2001	150	Allopathy
13	Government Vellore Medical College and Hospital	Adukkamparai	Vellore	2005	100	Allopathy
14	Government Tiruvannamalai Medical College and Hospital	Thiruvannamalai	Thiruvannamalai	2013	100	Allopathy
15	Government Karur Medical College and Hospital	Karur	Karur	2019	150	Allopathy
16	Government Theni Medical College and Hospital	Theni	Theni	2004	100	Allopathy
17	Government Coimbatore Medical College and Hospital	Peelamedu	Coimbatore	1966	150	Allopathy
18	Government Tirunelveli Medical College and Hospital	Palayamkottai	Tirunelveli	1965	250	Allopathy
19	Government Sivagangai Medical College and Hospital	Melavaniyankudi	Sivagangai	2012	100	Allopathy
20	Government Thiruvarur Medical College and Hospital	Thiruvarur	Thiruvarur	2010	100	Allopathy
21	Government Villupuram Medical College and Hospital	Mundiyampakkam	Villupuram	2010	100	Allopathy
22	Government Pudukkottai Medical College and Hospital	Pudukottai	Pudukottai	2017	150	Allopathy
23	Government Dindigul Medical College and Hospital	Dindigul	Dindigul	2021	150	Allopathy
24	Government Namkkal Medical College and Hospital	Namakkal	Namakkal	2008	150	Allopathy
25	Government Ramanathapuram Medical College and Hospital	Ramanathapuram	Ramanathapuram	2008	150	Allopathy
26	Government Virudhunagar Medical College and Hospital	Virudhunagar	Virudhunagar	2008	150	Allopathy
27	Government Ooty Medical College and Hospital	Ooty	Nilgiris	2008	150	Allopathy
28	Government Tiruppur Medical College and Hospital	Tiruppur	Tiruppur	2008	150	Allopathy
29	Government Krishnagiri Medical College and Hospital	Krishnagiri	Krishnagiri	2008	150	Allopathy
30	Government Nagapattinam Medical College and Hospital	Nagapattinam	Nagapattinam	2008	150	Allopathy
31	Government Thiruvallur Medical College and Hospital	Thiruvallur	Thiruvallur	2009	150	Allopathy
32	Government Ariyalur Medical College and Hospital	Ariyalur	Ariyalur	2009	150	Allopathy
33	Government Kallakurichi Medical College and Hospital	Kallakurichi	Kallakurichi	2009	150	Allopathy
34	Government Erode Medical and Hospital	Perundurai	Erode	1992	100	Allopathy
35	Government Cuddalore Medical and Hospital	Chidambaram	Cuddalore	1985	150	Allopathy

|}

== Autonomous institutes ==
University name	Location	District	Support	Specialization	Estd.
Bharathidasan Institute of Management	Tiruchirappalli	Tiruchirappalli	Bharathidasan University	Management	1984
Central Electrochemical Research Institute	Karaikudi	Sivaganga	Center	Electrochemistry	1948
Central Institute of Brackish Water Aquaculture	Chennai	Chennai	Center	Aquaculture	1987
Central Leather Research Institute	Adyar	Chennai	Center	Leather research	1948
Central University of Tamil Nadu	Tiruvarur	Tiruvarur	Center	Humanities, sciences	2009
Indian Institute of Food Processing Technology	Thanjavur	Thanjavur	Center	Crop research	1967
Indian Institute of Handloom Technology	Salem	Salem	Center	Handloom technology	1960
Indian Institute of Information Technology Tiruchirappalli	Tiruchirappalli	Tiruchirappalli	Center	Engineering	2013
Indian Institute of Information Technology Design & Manufacturing Kancheepuram	Kancheepuram	Kancheepuram	Center	Engineering	2005
Indian Institute of Management Tiruchirappalli	Tiruchirappalli	Tiruchirappalli	Center	Management	2011
Indian Institute of Technology Madras	Chennai	Chennai	Center	Engineering	1959
National Institute of Technology Tiruchirappalli	Tiruchirappalli	Tiruchirappalli	Center	Engineering	1964
National Institute of Fashion Technology	Chennai	Chennai	Center	Fashion design	1995
Sardar Vallabhbhai Patel International School of Textiles & Management	Coimbatore	Coimbatore	Center	Textile processing	2002
Tamil Nadu National Law School	Tiruchirappalli	Tiruchirappalli	Center	Legal	2014
Indian Institute of Industry Interaction Education & Research (IIIER Chennai)	Chennai	Chennai	Center	Engineering & Management	2014

=== State and central government joint support institutes ===
University name	Location	District	Support	Specialization	Estd.
Central Electro Chemical Research Institute (autonomous)	Karaikudi	Sivagangai	Department of Science and Technology (Govt of India)	Electrochemistry	1948
Institute of Mathematical Sciences, Chennai	Chennai	Chennai		Mathematics and Theoretical Sciences	1962
Indian Maritime University	Chennai	Chennai		Maritime Studies	2008
Madras Institute of Development Studies (autonomous)	Chennai	Chennai			1971
Tamil Virtual Academy	Chennai	Chennai	Government of Tamil Nadu	Tamil language	2001

== Colleges affiliated to universities ==
Name of college	Category	University affiliation	Location	District	Support	Estd.
ICAT Design & Media College	Design & Media		Chennai	Chennai		2004
Adithya Institute of Technology	Engineering	Autonomous under Anna University	Coimbatore	Coimbatore district	Private	2008
Alagappa Chettiar College of Engineering and Technology	Engineering	Anna University	Karaikudi	Sivagangai	Government	1952
Kumaraguru College of Liberal Arts and Science	Liberal Arts and Science	Bharathiar University	Coimbatore	Coimbatore	Self-financing	2018
Alagappa College of Technology	Engineering	Anna University	Chennai	Chennai	Government	1944
Annai Teresa College of Education,	Arts and science	Anna University	Ariyakudi	Sivagangai	Charitable Trust	
Arunachala College of Engineering for Women	Engineering	Anna University	Nagercoil	Kanyakumari	Self-financing	2009
Ayya Nadar Janaki Ammal College, Sivakasi	Arts and science		Sivakasi	Virudhunagar	Aided	
Bannari Amman Institute of Technology	Engineering	Autonomous under Anna University	Sathiyamangalam	Erode	Self-financing	1996
Bhajarang Engineering College	Engineering	Anna University	Thiruvallur	Thiruvallur	Self-financing	2001
Coimbatore Institute of Technology	Engineering	Autonomous under Anna University	Coimbatore	Coimbatore	Aided	1956
College of Agricultural Technology	Agriculture	Tamil Nadu Agricultural University	Kullapuram	Theni	Self-financing	2010
Dr.MGR Janaki College of Arts and Science for Women						
Dr. Sivanthi Aditanar College of Engineering	Engineering	Anna University	Tiruchendur	Thoothukudi	Private	1995
Easwari Engineering College	Engineering	Autonomous under Anna University	Chennai	Chennai	Self-financing	1996
Ethiraj College for Women	Arts and Sciences	Autonomous under University of Madras	Chennai	Chennai	Aided	1948
HIMT College (Hindustan Institute of Maritime Training)	Chennai	Indian Maritime University	Chennai	Chennai	Private	1998
AGURCHAND MANMULL JAIN COLLEGE (Am Jain College)	Arts and Sciences	University of Madras	Chennai	Chennai	Aided	1952
Film and Television Institute of Tamil Nadu (FTIT)						
Government Arts College, Karur	Arts and science	Bharathidasan University	Karur	Karur	Government	
Government College of Technology, Coimbatore						
Government College of Engineering, Salem						
Hindustan Institute of Technology and Science						
Indian Institute of Information Technology Design & Manufacturing Kancheepuram						
Indra Ganesan College of Engineering						
Institute of Road and Transport Technology	Engineering	Anna University	Erode	Erode	Government	1984
Jeppiaar Engineering College, Chennai	Engineering	Anna University	Rajiv Gandhi Salai	Chennai	Self- Financing	2001
Jerusalem College of Engineering, Chennai, Chennai						
Jaya Group of Colleges,		University of Madras	Chennai		Private	1977
J.K.K.Nattraja College of Arts & Science	Arts and Science	Periyar University	Komarapalayam	Namakkal	Aided, Self Financing	1974
J.K.K.Nattraja College of Engineering and Technology	Engineering	Anna University	Komarapalayam	Namakkal	Private	2008
J.K.K.Nattraja College of Education	Teacher Training	Tamil Nadu Teachers Education University	Chennai	Namakkal	Private	2016
J.K.K.Nattraja College of Nursing and Research	Nursing	Tamil Nadu Dr. M.G.R. Medical University	Chennai	Chennai	Private	2006
J.K.K.Nattraja College of Pharmacy	Pharmacy	Pharmacy Council of India	New Delhi	New Delhi	Government	1985
J.K.K.Nattraja Dental College and Hospital	Medical	Tamil Nadu Dr. M.G.R. Medical University	Chennai	Chennai	Private	1987
K L N College of Engineering, Madurai	Engineering	Anna University	Madurai	Madurai		1994
KLN College of Information Technology, Madurai	Engineering	Anna University	Madurai	Madurai		2001
Karpagam College of Engineering	Engineering	Autonomous under Anna University	Coimbatore	Coimbatore	Self-financing	2000
Kongu Engineering College	Engineering	Autonomous under Anna University	Erode	Erode	Self-financing	1984
KPR Institute of Engineering and Technology	Engineering	Autonomous under Anna University	Coimbatore	Coimbatore	Self-financing	2009
Kumaraguru College of Technology	Engineering	Autonomous under Anna University	Coimbatore	Coimbatore	Self-financing	1984
KV Institute of Management and Information Studies	Management	Anna University	Coimbatore	Coimbatore	Self-financing	2008
Loyola College						
Loyola Institute of Business Administration						
M.Kumarasamy College of Engineering	Engineering	Anna University	Karur	Karur	Un-aided	
Madras Christian College						
Madras School of Economics	Economics	Central University of Tamil Nadu, University of Madras	Chennai	Chennai		1995
Mahendra Engineering College (Autonomous)	Engineering	Affiliated to Anna University	Mallasamudram	Namakkal	Private	1995
Mailam Engineering College	Engineering	Anna University	Tindivanam	Villupuram	Self-financing	1998
MAM College of Engineering and Technology	Engineering	Anna University	Trichy		Self-financing	1998
Marthandam College of Engineering and Technology	Engineering	Anna University	Marthandam	Kanyakumari		
Mepco Schlenk Engineering College	Engineering	Anna University	Sivakasi	Virudhunagar	private	1985
Mount Zion College of Engineering and Technology	Engineering	Anna University	Pudukkottai	Pudukkottai	Self-financing	2001
National Institute of Siddha	Medical	Tamil Nadu Dr. M.G.R. Medical University	Chennai	Chennai	Aided	
Paavai Engineering College						
Paavai College of Engineering						
Parisutham Institute of Technology & Science	Engineering	Anna University	TANJORE	Tanjore	Private	2008
Presidency College	Arts and Science	Autonomous under University of Madras	Chennai	Chennai	Government	1840
PSG College of Arts and Science	Arts and Science	Autonomous under Bharathiar University	Coimbatore	Coimbatore	Aided	1947
PSG College of Technology	Engineering	Autonomous under Anna University	Coimbatore	Coimbatore	Aided	1951
Rajalakshmi Engineering College, Chennai	Engineering	Anna University	Thandalam	Chennai	Private	1997
Ramakrishna Mission Vidyalaya, Coimbatore						
Rathinam College of Arts and Science	Arts & Science	Autonomous under Bharathiar University	Coimbatore	Coimbatore		
Rathinam Technical Campus	Engineering	Autonomous under Anna University	Coimbatore	Coimbatore		
RMD Engineering College						
RMK College of Engineering and Technology						
RMK Engineering College	Engineering	Anna University	Gummidipoondi	Thiruvallur	Private	1995
Sri Krishna College of Engineering & Technology	Engineering	Autonomous under Anna University	Kuniyamuthur	Coimbatore	Private	1998
Sacred Heart College, Thirupattur	Arts & Science	Thiruvalluvar University	Tirupattur	Tirupattur	Aides and self-financed	1951
S.A. Engineering College						
Shree Venkateshwara Hi-Tech Engineering College						
Sri Parasakthi College for Women	Arts and Sciences	Manonmaniam Sundaranar University	Coutrallam	Tirunelveli		1964
St. Joseph College of Education	BEd (education)	Tamil Nadu Teachers Education University	Kalakad Road, Kadamboduvalvu, Nanguneri	Tirunelveli	Self-financing	2007
St. Joseph's College of Engineering						
St. Peter's Engineering College						
St. Thomas College, Chennai						
Sri Sai Ram Engineering College						
Sri Ramakrishna Engineering College	Engineering	Autonomous under Anna University	Coimbatore	Coimbatore	Self-financing	1984
Sri Venkateswara College of Engineering						
SSN College of Engineering	Engineering	Autonomous under Anna University	Kelambakkam	Chengalpattu	Private	1996
Sona College of Technology, Salem						
The New College						
Thiagarajar College of Engineering						
Thiagarajar School of Management						
Thiruthangal Nadar College						
Valliammai Engineering College	Engineering	Anna University	Potheri	Kanchipuram	Self Financing	1999
Vidhyaa Giri College of Arts and Science,	Arts and science	Anna University	Karaikudi	Sivagangai	Aided	
Vickram College of Engineering						
Velammal College of Engineering and Technology						
Velalar College of Engineering and Technology	Engineering	Autonomous under Anna University	Erode	Erode	Self Financing	2001
Velammal Engineering College						
Women's Christian College, Chennai						

== See also ==
- List of Tamil Nadu Government educational institutions
- List of Tamil Nadu Government Medical Colleges
- List of Tamil Nadu Government Arts and Science Colleges
