= Karpagam (disambiguation) =

Karpagam 1963 Indian film.

Karpagam may also refer to:

- Karpagam Academy of Higher Education
- Karpagam College of Engineering
- Karpagam Vanthachu, a 1993 film
