= SREC =

SREC may refer to:

- Solar renewable energy certificates, a form of tax incentive for alternative energy used in some U.S. states
- Sussex Rural Electric Cooperative, a New Jersey electric power company.
- The Motorola S-record format, a computer data format for encoding binary data in ASCII
- Sri Ramakrishna Engineering College, a college situated in Vattamalaipalayam, Tamil Nadu, India
