= Chennai (disambiguation) =

Chennai is the capital city of Tamil Nadu, India.

Chennai may also refer to:

== Places ==
- Chennai Central
- Chennai district
- Chennai metropolitan area
- Chennai International Airport
- Chennai Port
- Chennai railway division
- Greater Chennai Corporation

== Sport teams ==
- Chennai Blitz
- Chennai City F.C.
- Chennai Lions
- Chennai Slam
- Chennai Super Kings
- Chennai Superstarz
- Chennaiyin FC

== Others ==
- Chennai Metropolitan Development Authority, government agency
- Chennai Institute of Technology, an engineering college in Tamil Nadu
- INS Chennai, a guided missile destroyer of the Indian Navy

== See also ==
- Madras (disambiguation)
