= Madha Engineering College =

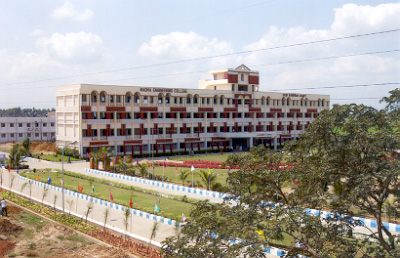
- Type: Private (Minority)
- Established: 1998
- Affiliation: Anna University
- Chairman: Dr. S. Peter
- Location: Kundrathur, Chennai, Tamil Nadu, India; 12.993545°N 80.084893°E
- Website: madhaengineeringcollege.com

Madha Engineering College (MEC) is a private engineering college located in Kundrathur, Chennai, Tamil Nadu, India. Established in 1998 Peter through a Christian Minority Educational Trust, it is approved by the All India Council for Technical Education (AICTE) and affiliated to Anna University. The college reports an alumni base of over 15,000 graduates.

== Overview ==
Madha Engineering College was founded by Dr. S. Peter, who has also established two educational trusts, the Susaiah Peter Educational Trust and the Lourdu Ammal Educational Trust, which are used to provide education to impoverished students, and have also founded a medical school.

MEC describes its academic model as using Experiential learning to industry to prepare students for employment, it has also helped pre-university student with guidance counseling. In 2011 the death of a student by electrocution on college grounds raised concerns about the quality of MEC's appliances. The college falls within the jurisdiction of Sirukalathur Village Panchayat, Kundrathur Taluk.

=== River boundary issue ===
In Chennai, efforts to fight river encroachment on the river bank of the Adyar River have let to the demolition of hundreds of houses. While residents of nearby localities were being evicted by authorities, no corresponding action was taken against several institutions including Madha Engineering College, which residents alleged were situated well within the established river boundary.

=== Ghost professors allegations ===
In 2025, the Directorate of Vigilance and Anti-Corruption (DVAC) registered a First Information Report (FIR) in connection with a "ghost faculty" scam in which 353 individuals were found to have been simultaneously listed as full-time faculty at more than one of 224 Anna University-affiliated engineering colleges. Madha Engineering College was among the four colleges named in the case. Several officials were named for facilitating the fraud by submitting false inspection reports.

== Courses ==
In 2009, the Aeronautical engineering programme was cancelled following a surprise inspection by Anna University officials, who found the college lacked adequate infrastructure for the programme.

=== UG programmes ===
- B.E. Aeronautical Engineering
- B.E. Computer Science and Engineering
- B.E. Electronics and Communication Engineering
- B.E. Electrical and Electronics Engineering
- B.E. Electronics and Instrumentation Engineering
- B.E. Mechanical Engineering
- B.E. Bio Medical Engineering
- B.Tech. Biotechnology
- B.Tech. Information Technology
- B.Tech. Computer Science & Business System
- B.Tech. Artificial Intelligence and Data Science
- B.Tech. Artificial Intelligence and Machine Learning

=== PG programmes ===
- M.E. Computer Science and Engineering
- M.E. Communication Systems
- M.E. CAD/CAM
- M.C.A.
- M.B.A.
