= St. Joseph College of Education =

Teacher's college in Tamil Nadu, India

- Motto: Let them give light to the world
- Type: Self-financing Institution
- Established: Women and Child Development Society in 2007
- Affiliations: Tamil Nadu Teachers Education University
- Chairman: Thiru A.Tamilselvan
- Location: Kadamboduvalvu, Nanguneri, Tirunelveli, Tamil Nadu, India
- Website: www.stjosephcedu.org

St. Joseph College of Education is a teacher education college in Tamil Nadu, India. It is approved by the National Council for Teacher Education (NCTE), Bangalore, and is affiliated with the Tamil Nadu Teachers Education University, Chennai.

== About the College ==
St. Joseph College of Education is on the Kalakad – Nanguneri Road, Tirunelveli District, and is run by 'The Women and Child Development Society'.

=== Motto ===
'Terras Irradient', a Latin phrase, which means 'Let them give light to the world'.

== Courses Offered ==
The college offers BEd degree programme in full-time basis. The course of study shall be for a duration of one academic year consisting of 200 working days / curriculum transaction days or 1200 hours (6days per week @ 6 hour per day) excluding admission and examination days. The 200 working days will include teaching practice, revision examination and study holidays.

Programme Content and Details

The programme content will be as per the Tamil Nadu Teachers Education University. The programme will consist of theory and practicum component.

Subjects offered

- Tamil Education
- English Education
- Mathematics Education
- Physical Science Education
- Biological Science Education
- History Education
- Commerce Education
- Economics Education
- Computer Science Education

Electives offered

- Guidance and Counselling
- Environmental Education
- Physical and Health Education
- Computers in Education

== Coat of arms ==
The emblem consists of a shield with a ribbon. The shield is divided into four sectors, which depicts the four major dimensions of education namely intellectual, emotional, physical and spiritual. In the centre, the four sectors are separated by a cross which depicts the four directions namely North, South, East and West.

A candle on the top of the right side stands for knowledge. It eliminates ignorance (darkness) and bestows wisdom (brightness). A computer on the bottom of the right side symbolizes science and technology. At the bottom of the left side a man bearing a book stands for education and training. A cross on the left top symbolizes sanctity, prosperity and godliness. Rays from the cross blesses and purifies all the things. Around the shield, the name of the college and place with pin code is imprinted in a circle.

== Administration ==
Mr. A. Tamilselvan s/o Arasamuthu Nadar is the chairman and Mrs. M. Vijaya Gnanapoo is the correspondent of this college. Dr.A.S.Arul Lawrence was the Principal from 15 July 2010 to 26 February 2014. Now, Dr.J.Albert Prince Kumar is the principal of the college since 1 March 2014.
