= St. Mother Theresa Engineering College =

Indian Engineering College

Coordinates: 8.73716°N 78.01501°E

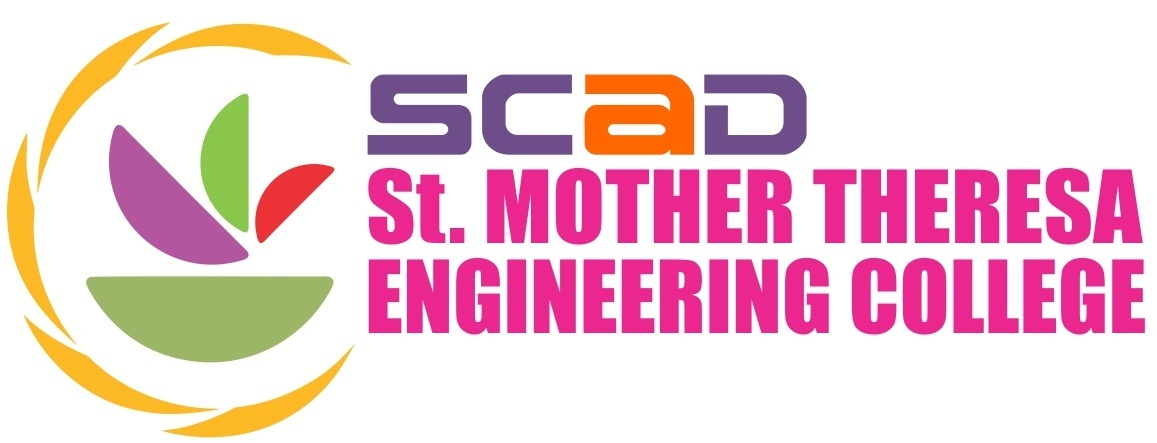
- Emblem of St. Mother Theresa Engineering College
- Established: 2009
- Affiliations: Anna University, AICTE
- Religious affiliation: Roman Catholic
- Principal: George Clinton
- Location: Vagaikulam, Tamil Nadu, India
- Website: www.mtec.ac.in

St. Mother Theresa Engineering College (SMTEC), Vagaikulam in Tuticorin, Tamil Nadu, India is a self-financing engineering college run by the SCAD(Social Change And Development) group of institutions.

The institution is approved by AICTE and affiliated with Anna University, Chennai. The college was established by Dr.S.Cletus Babu in 2009 with innovative efforts to providing technical education to rural people of Tuticorin district. It hosts a program for students to help provide direct education to rural famers. SMTEC started its function with 157 students and 47 staffs offering five Engineering Degree courses. The college's namesake is Mother Teresa.

SMTEC ranks first among its sister institutions Francis Xavier Engineering College, and SCAD Engineering College and has received a "Four-star" award from the Ministry of Education, its teachers have received training from the All India Council for Technical EducationThere is a notable number of Malayali students in every departments pursuing their degree at SMTEC.

== SCAD ==
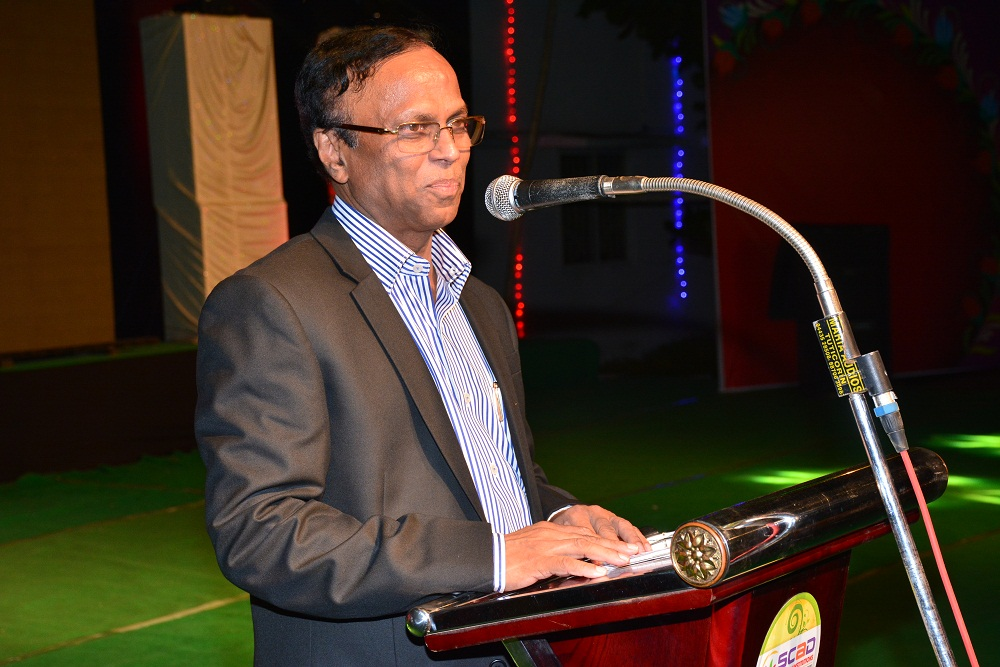
Chairman giving speech in Culturals'16

SCAD (Social Change And Development) was founded in 1985 by Dr.S.Cletus Babu working with 5 villages in Cheranmahadevi. Dr.J.X Amali Cletus Babu is its Vice-President. The main objective of the SCAD Group of institutions is to promote educational institutions for the overall benefit of the country in general and the state in particular.

== Undergraduate programmes ==
- B.E in Computer Science and Engineering
- B.E in Electronics and Communication Engineering
- B.E in Electrical and Electronics Engineering
- B.E in Mechanical Engineering
- B.E in Civil Engineering
