= Misrimal Navajee Munoth Jain Engineering College =

College in Chennai, Tamil Nadu, India

Misrimal Navajee Munoth Jain Engineering College (MNMJEC or MNM) is an engineering college located within the Chennai city limits along the National IT Highway on the Old Mahabalipuram Road.

== History ==
The college was started in the year 1994, with the primary objective of providing higher education to Jain students. However, others were and are also admitted without reference to caste or religion. The main objective of this college is "No donation and no capitation".The college is under TEAM Trust The Tamil Nadu Educational and Medical Trust (TEAM Trust) was founded in 1972 with a view to provide high quality Technical and Medical Education in Tamil Nadu.

== Under Graduate Courses ==
- B.E. Civil Engineering
- B.E. Mechanical Engineering
- B.E. Electrical & Electronics Engineering
- B.E. Electronics & Communication Engineering
- B.E. Computer Science Engineering
- B.Tech. Information Technology
- B.Tech. Artificial Intelligence & Data Science

== Post Graduate Courses ==
- M.E. Computer Science Engineering (CSE)
- M.E. Structural Engineering (Civil)
- Master of Business Administration

== Research Courses ==
- Ph.D. Computer Science Engineering (CSE)

S.No	Branch
1.	BACHELOR OF CIVIL ENGINEERING
2	BACHELOR OF MECHANICAL ENGINEERING
3.	BACHELOR OF ELECTRONICS AND ELECTRICAL ENGINEERING
4.	BACHELOR OF ELECTRONICS AND COMMUNICATION ENGINEERING
5.	BACHELOR OF COMPUTER SCIENCE ENGINEERING
6.	BACHELOR OF INFORMATION TECHNOLOGY
7.	MASTER OF COMPUTER SCIENCE ENGINEERING
8.	MASTER OF STRUCTURAL ENGINEERING
9.	MASTER OF BUSINESS ADMINISTRATION

Facilities

- Library
- Transportation Bus
- Hostel
- Medical center
- Banking
- Mess
- Canteen
- Exams
- Play Ground
- Sports

Student Welfare

- Cultural Association
- NSS
- Rotaract Club
- Leo Club
