= Karpagam Academy of Higher Education =

University in Coimbatore, Tamil Nadu, India

- Motto: Enable Enlighten Enrich
- Type: Deemed university
- Established: 2008
- Chairman: Dr.R.Vasanthakumar
- Chancellor: Dr.K.Ramasamy
- President: Dr.R.Vasanthakumar
- Vice-Chancellor: Dr. B. Venkatachalapathy
- Dean: Senior Prof. Dr.P.Thamilarasi
- President: Dr. R. VasanthaKumar
- Location: Coimbatore, Tamil Nadu, India
- Campus: Urban
- Website: www.kahedu.edu.in

Karpagam Academy of Higher Education (KAHE) is a private deemed to be university, located in Coimbatore Tamil Nadu, India. It was established under Section 3 of UGC Act 1956 is approved by Ministry of Human Resource and Development, Government of India. Dr.R.Vasanthakumar, the president of the trust a philanthropist, industrialist, entrepreneur and culture promoter.

The academy has 9000 students and over 750 teaching and non-teaching staff.

== Recognition ==
- Karpagam University was established under Section 3 of the UGC Act 1956, of University Grants Commission, Government of India, New Delhi.
- Recognized by the Ministry of Human Resource Development, Department of Higher Education, Government of India, New Delhi.
- Accredited with A+ grade by NAAC in the Second Cycle
- Recognized by UGC-AICTE to conduct Engineering/Technology Programs
- Recognized by CoA to offer Architecture Programs
- Recognized by PCI to offer Pharmacy Programs
