= M. Kumarasamy College of Engineering =

College in Tamil Nadu, India

- மா.குமாரசாமி பொறியியல் கல்லூரி
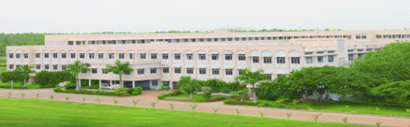
- Administrative building of the college
- Other names: MKCE
- Motto: Discipline, Hard work, Success; Student Success is Our Success
- Type: Private
- Established: 2000
- Academic staff: 250+
- Administrative staff: 100
- Students: 4000+
- Location: Karur, Tamil Nadu, India; 11.0549°N 78.0481°E
- Campus: Suburban, 50 acres (20 ha)
- Website: mkce.ac.in

M. Kumarasamy College of Engineering (MKCE) is located in Thalavapalayam on the way to Karur and Salem. The college was founded by M. Kumarasamy, the correspondent and also the management trustee of M. Kumarasamy Health & Education Trust in the year of 2001. The college is affiliated to the Anna University, Chennai and also approved by the All India Council of Technical Education, New Delhi. Mr. Raja Subramanian is the college's general manager.

== MKCE (autonomous) history ==
MKCE established in the year 2000 by the M. Kumarasamy Health and Educational Trust. In November 2011 upgraded as Autonomous Institution and affiliated to Anna University, Chennai. Accredited by NAAC.

== Value added courses ==
Value added courses are designed and offered by each department. These courses are conducted after the regular college hours. In addition to the above other course offered are, BEC Course, C Language, Catia, Embedded Systems, Fundamentals of Computer Programming, Infosys Campus Connect Programme, Lab View, MAT Lab, Rational Suite (IBM), Solid Works, Spoken English, Tele – logic, TV Assembly & Servicing Courses, VLSI Design,

== College library ==
The Library started its service in 2000 as a part of MKCE. The fully computerized Library Information Systems helps the staff and students tremendously in day-to-day operations.

The Library uses LIPS-i-NET software system with barcode scanning facility. Every document in the Library bears a barcode tag that is used for its circulation.

== Science and humanities ==
=== Maths ===
The Mathematics Department was established in the year 2000 with the destination of offering basic knowledge to the undergraduate students in Science and Technology. It fulfills the basic needs of undergraduate students and strengthens their knowledge in mathematics.

=== Physics ===
The physics department was established in the year 2000 with the destination of offering basic knowledge to the undergraduate students in Science and Technology. It fulfills the basic needs of undergraduate students and strengthens their knowledge in physics.

==== Facilities available (physics) ====
- Physics Laboratory as per the specification of Anna University, Coimbatore
- Laboratory to conduct physics practicals to I Year B.E / B.Tech.
- Faculty members

=== Chemistry ===
The Department of chemistry was established in the year 2000 with the destination of offering basic knowledge to the undergraduate students in Science and Technology. It fulfills the basic needs of undergraduate students and strengthens their knowledge in Chemistry.

=== English ===
==== Lab facilities (English) ====
- The Language Lab is equipped with 61 computer systems loaded with self-language learning software.
- In addition to that visual aids like Television, DVD player and LCD projector are used to hone the soft skills.

== Rankings ==
University rankings

Engineering – India
- NIRF (2024): 201-300

The National Institutional Ranking Framework (NIRF) ranked the university between 201-300 in the engineering rankings in 2024.

== Mkce library collections ==
- Total number of books :33,000
- Total number of titles :16,297
- Non-book materials :2750
- Total number of journals :22
