= Arunai engineering college =

College in Tamil Nadu, India

Coordinates: 12°11′34″N 79°4′59″E

Arunai Engineering College
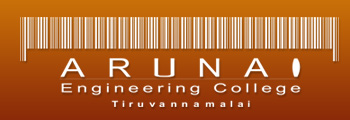
- Motto: "Ulaypavarae Uyarnthavar" உழைப்பவரே உயர்ந்தவர்
- Motto in English: AllOne Works like the Greatest Man visu
- Type: Private
- Established: 1993
- Academic affiliations: Anna University
- Faculty: 308
- Students: 3430
- Location: Tiruvannamalai, Tamil Nadu, India
- Campus: Rural, 31.5 acres (0.1 km^{2})
- Website: www.arunai.org

Arunai Engineering College (AEC) is a private college located in Thiruvannaamalai, Tamil Nadu, India.

AEC was founded in 1993 by Thiru E. V. Velu, on behalf of the Saraswathi Ammal Educational Trust. The college is located on the Chittor - Cuddalore national highway spreading over 31.5 acres

The college has been lauded by India's top magazine Frontline for shaping the face of education in Tamil Nadu.

== History ==
=== Initial years ===
In 1993 the college was granted permission to conduct engineering courses in the disciplines of mechanical engineering, electrical and electronics engineering and computer science engineering, awarded by the University of Madras and approved by the AICTE

=== Expansion ===
In subsequent years the college has started courses like biotechnology, chemical engineering, computer applications (masters), electronics and communication engineering, information technology.

=== Courses offered ===
==== Undergraduate ====
===== Bachelor of Engineering =====
- Civil Engineering
- Computer Science Engineering
- Electrical and Electronics Engineering
- Electronics and Communication Engineering
- Electronics and Instrumentation Engineering
- Mechanical Engineering

===== Bachelor of Technology =====
- Biotechnology
- Chemical Engineering
- Information Technology

==== Postgraduate ====
- Biotechnology
- Computer Science
- Applied Electronics
- Network Engineering
- Power Electronics & Drives
- Embedded System Technologies
- CAD/CAM
- Structural Engineering
- Thermal Engineering

==== Master of Business administration ====
- MBA

=== Co-curricular activities ===
Co-Curricular activities are encouraged in Arunai Engineering College. Every department conduct respective Symposiums, workshops and seminars annually. They are also involved in research work.

The department of biotechnology is an active participant in various research activities that take place in the world of Biotechnology. The department is actively engaged in quality life science education and is ranked among top private biotech schools in India by Biospectrum magazine.

== Facilities ==
=== Library ===
The library spans two floors containing more than 30,000 volumes of books with topics related to arts, science, engineering, technology and Management. The college subscribes to more than 250 Indian and international journals. Both the floors are air-conditioned with facilities for Internet usage, reprography, a media library as well as a book bank.

In addition to the Central Library, all departments have dedicated libraries.

== Awards and accolades ==
The students of the college have won awards in competitions and conferences around India. In October 2011, the students of AEC received four awards at the National level ISTE conference held at Jayam Engineering College, Dharmapuri.

In the 2012 annual ISTE convention held at Sanjay Ghodawat Group of Institutions, Kohlapur, Maharashtra, the projects developed by students of Arunai Engineering College were awarded. A majority of students from the college also visited the event and won prizes in various events including Paper Presentation and others.

The IEEE Association website of the college has been awarded second place for the best design in the Asia-pacific region. As a stipend, they also received US$350.
