= Jaya Group of Colleges =

- ஜெயா கல்லூரிகள்
- Other name: Jaya Educational Trust
- Motto: Your success is our service
- Type: Private
- Established: 1977
- Affiliations: Madras, Anna, Thiruvalluvar, NTRUHS, MGRMU and TNTEU
- Chairman: Prof. A. Kanakaraj
- Location: Thiruninravur, Tamil Nadu, India; 13°7′21″N 80°2′44″E
- Campus: Suburban
- Nickname: JET
- Website: www.jayagc.org

The Jaya Group of Colleges (Tamil: ஜெயா கல்லூரிகள்) consists of more than 20 education institutions including two higher secondary schools and seven professional course institutions in the suburbs of Thiruninravur, Chennai, Tamil Nadu, India. The colleges are run by a trust named Jaya Education Trust. The trust was founded in 1977 and expanded into a chain of minority run establishments. The school caters to the needs of students in and around Thiruninravur, a majority of whom are socially and economically disadvantaged.

== Institutions ==
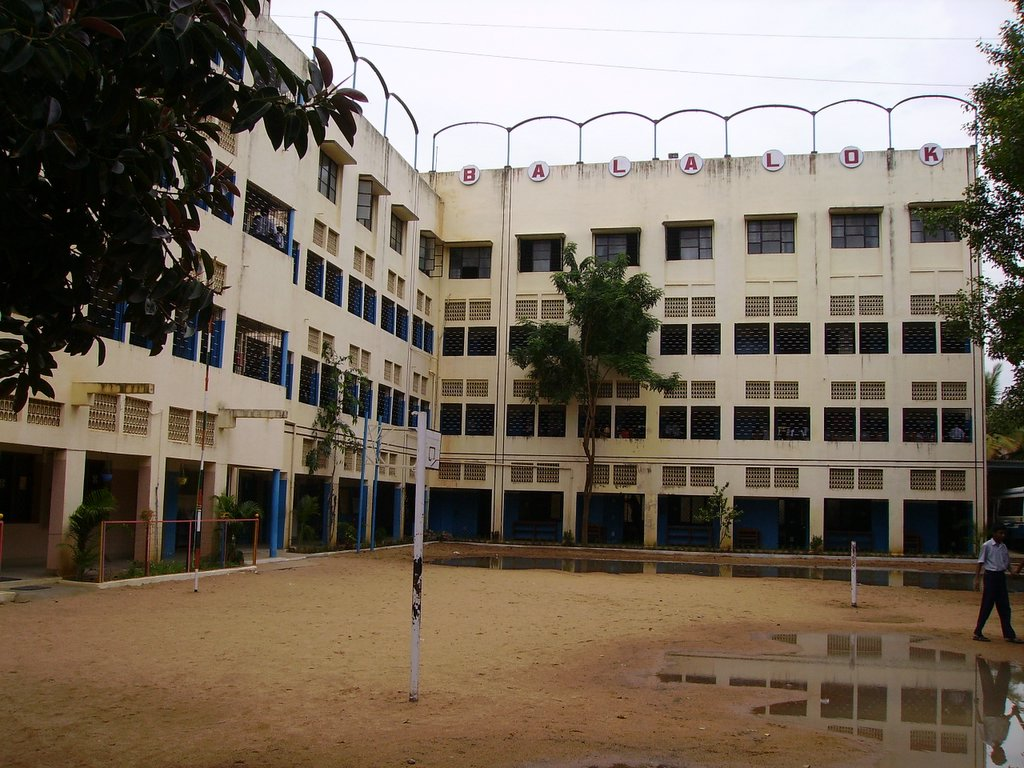
Balalok Matriculation Higher Secondary School in Virugambakkam

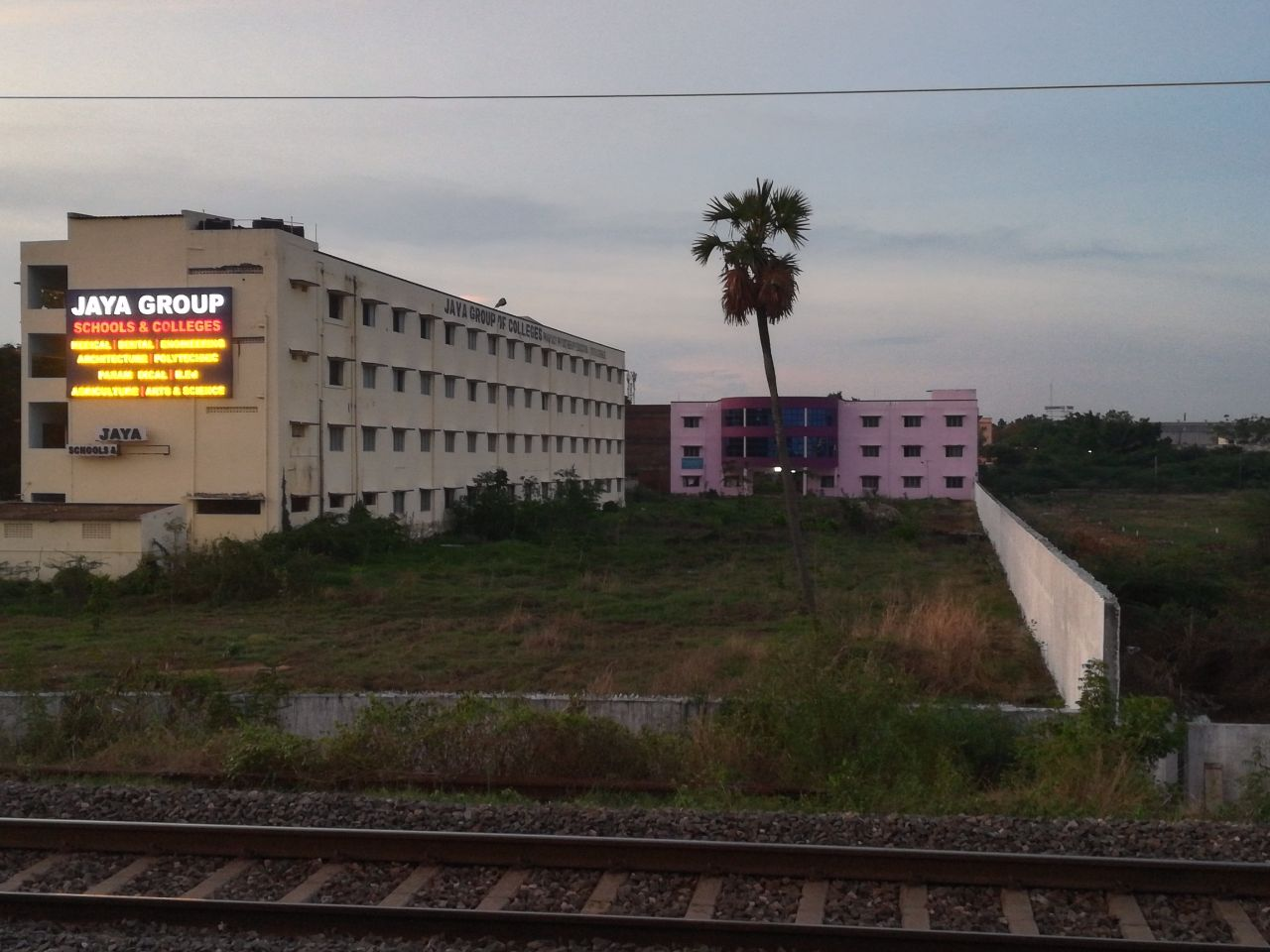
Jaya Group of Colleges at Nemilichery

The campuses of the group include:

- SVS Medical, Dental & Nursing College
- Ragas Dental College & Gen.Hospital
- Jaya Engineering College
- Jaya College of Engineering & Technology
- Jaya Institute of Technology
- Jaya Sakthi Engineering College
- Jaya College of Arts & Science
- Jaya - Arakkonam Arts & Science
- Jaya College of Education
- Jaya Polytechnic College
- Ragas School of Nursing
- Jaya College of Pharmacy
- National College of Pharmacy
- Jaya College of Physiotheraphy
- Balalok Matriculation Hr. Sec. School
- Jaya Matriculation Hr. Sec. School
- Sri Sathya Sai Matriculation School
- Jaya Public School

== Courses ==
The group offers undergraduate and postgraduate courses in Electronics and Communications, EEE, Information Technology, Computing, Engineering, Textile technology, Biotechnology, Dentistry, Pharmacy, Biochemistry, Microbiology, Mathematics, Commerce and Business studies. PhD research course is also offered for Dentistry in Ragas Dental College campus.

== International connections ==
The group was the first international chapter of the Sigma Iota Epsilon (SIE) outside United States.

The group has a MoU with Korea's oldest University, Chonbuk National University, which includes collaborative teaching, training and student exchanges. A similar MoU exists with Danish Koge Business School.
