= KPR Institute of Engineering and Technology =

Autonomous college in Tamil Nadu, India

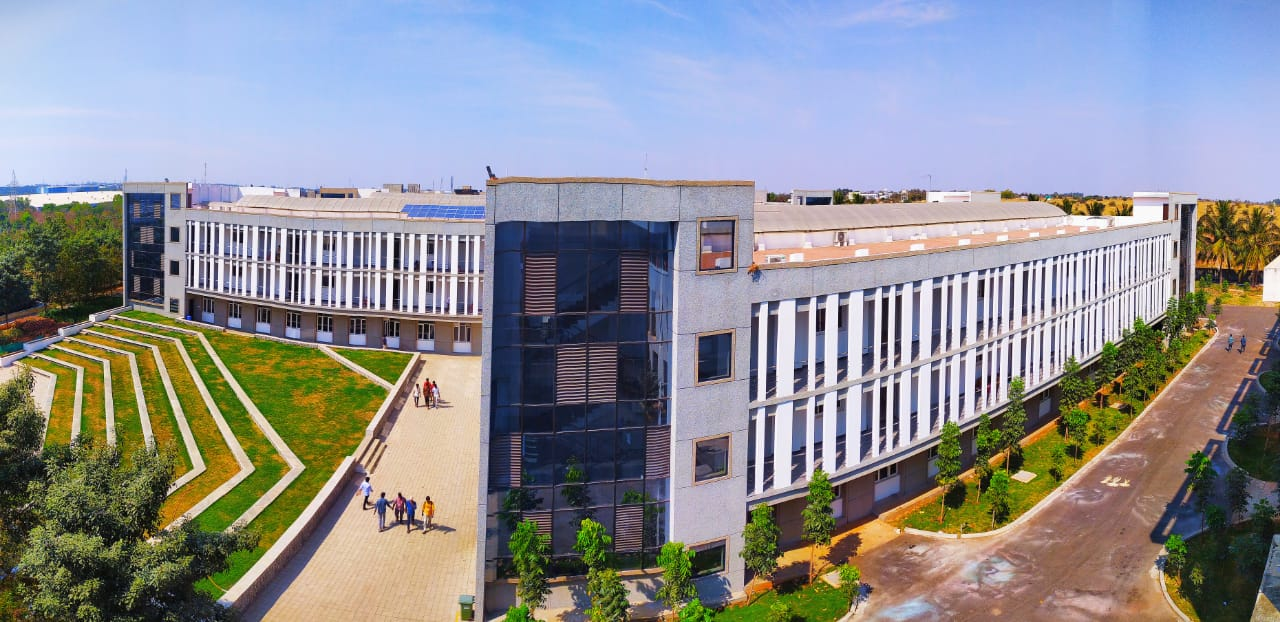
- Motto: Learn Beyond
- Type: Autonomous
- Established: 2009
- Affiliations: Anna University, Chennai
- Chairman: Dr. K. P. Ramasamy
- Principal: Dr. Akila Muthuramalingam
- Location: Coimbatore, India
- Campus: 66 Acres; Suburban
- Website: kpriet.edu.in

KPR Institute of Engineering and Technology is a autonomous institution established in 2009 in Coimbatore, Tamil Nadu, India. KPRIET is approved by AICTE, New Delhi and affiliated to Anna University, Chennai.

KPRIET, a 150-acre campus located in Coimbatore Tamil Nadu, offers adequate facilities, including smart classrooms, state-of-the-art laboratories, Student-led Experience Centres, Centres of Excellence, auditoriums, hostels, gym and playgrounds. KPRIET has over 6,800 students from 18 countries, 350 faculty members, and 300 support staff, offering 14 Undergraduate, 7 Postgraduate, and 13 research programs leading to the award of Ph D. KPRIET advocates the theme of 'Learn Beyond', and encourages active participation of the students in 50+ cultural and technical clubs. Besides, KPRIET has established a network with 30+ Professional Bodies to provide enhanced educational experience to the learners with current trends and issues.

== Programmes offered ==
=== Undergraduate Programmes ===
1. Artificial Intelligence & Data Science
2. Biomedical Engineering
3. Chemical Engineering
4. Civil Engineering
5. Computer Science and Engineering
6. Computer Science and Engineering (AIML)
7. Computer Science and Engineering (Cyber Security)
8. Computer Science and Business Systems
9. Electronics and Communication Engineering
10. Electrical and Electronics Engineering
11. Electronics Engineering (VLSI)
12. Information Technology
13. Mechanical Engineering
14. Mechatronics Engineering

=== Postgraduate Programmes ===
1. CAD / CAM
2. Computer Science and Engineering
3. Data Sciences
4. Structural Engineering
5. VLSI Design
6. Embedded System
7. Master of Business Administration

== Rankings ==
1. NIRF Rankings: KPRIET is ranked in the 101–150 band in Engineering and the 151–200 band in the Overall category under the National Institutional Ranking Framework.
2. UI GreenMetric World University Rankings 2026: KPRIET secured 780th position globally and 34th position in India, reflecting its commitment to environmental sustainability and green campus initiatives.
3. QS I-GAUGE Diamond Rating: KPRIET was awarded the Diamond Rating under the QS I-GAUGE Indian College Ratings system.
4. Institution’s Innovation Council (IIC) 4-Star Rating: KPRIET received a 4-Star Rating for the fifth consecutive year, recognising its sustained commitment to innovation and entrepreneurship.

University rankings

General – India
- NIRF (Overall) (2024): 151-200
