= List of educational institutions in Krishnagiri district =

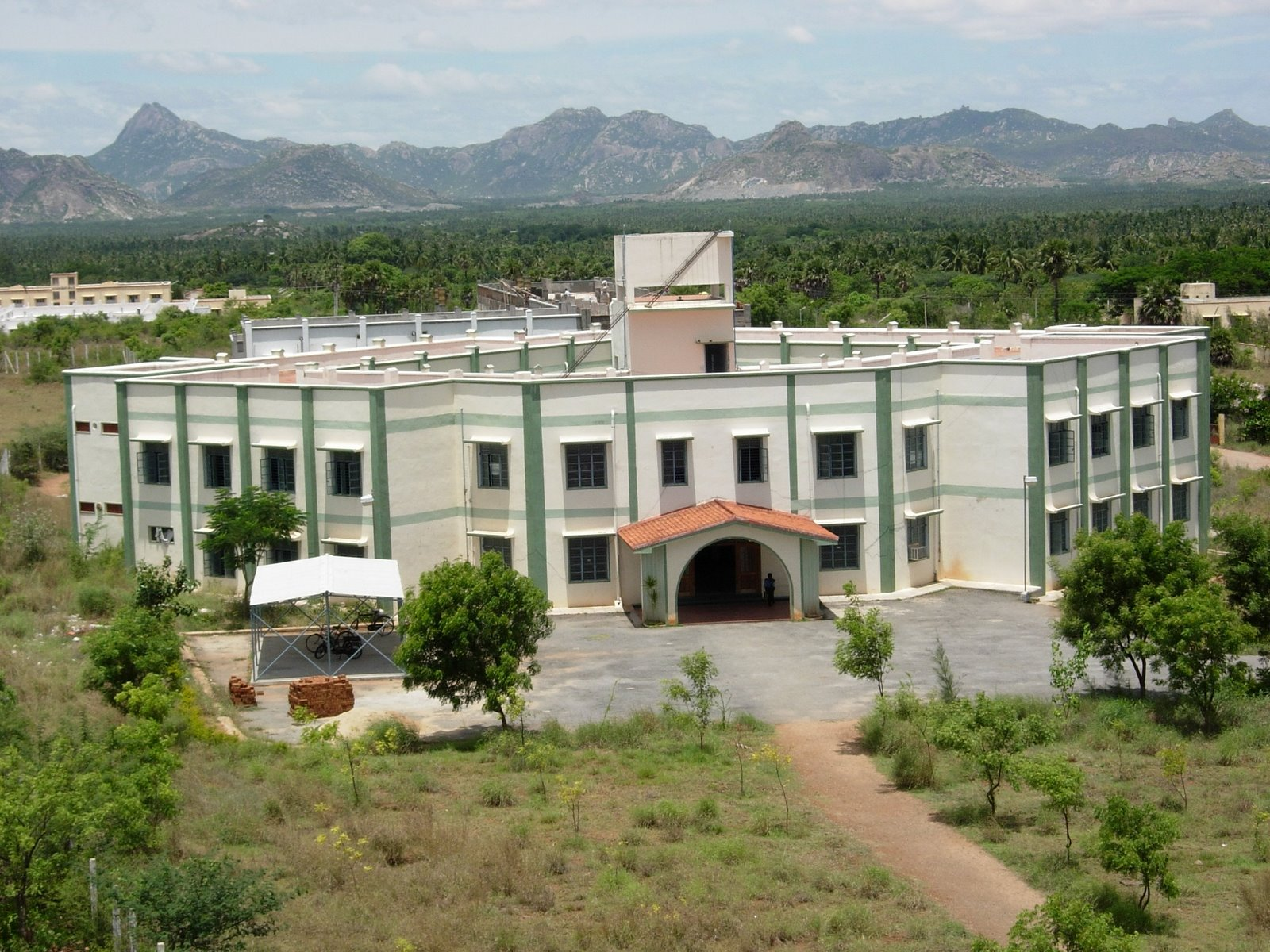
Government Engineering College, Bargur

This is a list of the schools and colleges in Krishnagiri district.

- Adhiyamaan College of Engineering, Hosur.
- Government College of Engineering, Bargur
