= Velammal Institute of Technology =

- Motto in English: None
- Type: Private
- Established: 2008
- Affiliations: Anna University
- Chairman: M.V.Muthuramalingam
- Principal: Dr. N.Balaji
- Faculty: ~140
- Students: ~1600
- Undergraduates: ~1600
- Location: Ponneri, Tiruvallur district, Tamil Nadu, India; 13.29458°N 80.14927°E
- Campus: ~20 acres
- Nickname: Velammal I Tech
- Website: www.velammalitech.edu.in

Velammal Institute of Technology, is a private institution located in Thiruvallur District, Tamil Nadu, India. It was established in 2008.

It prepares students for the field of engineering by developing theoretical knowledge as well as practical skills.

== Departments ==
Under Graduate Courses

- Computer Science & Engineering
- Electrical and Electronics Engineering
- Electronics and Communication Engineering
- Mechanical Engineering
- Information Technology
