= SNS College of Technology =

Institute in Tamil Nadu, India

SNS College of technology
- Other name: SNSCT
- Type: Private
- Established: 2002
- Chairman: Deiva Thiru Dr. S.N. Subbramanian
- Principal: Dr. Charles S.
- Location: Coimbatore, India
- Campus: 50 acres (20 ha); Urban
- Website: SNS College of Technology

SNS College of Technology is located at Coimbatore, Tamil Nadu, India. It was established in 2002 as part of the SNS Groups. The college is approved by AICTE and affiliated to the Anna University, Coimbatore. Anna University, Chennai confirmed the conferment of Autonomous status to SNS College of Technology for a period of 10 years with effect from 2018–19 to 2027–28.

SNS College of Technology was founded in 2002 and has been administered and run by Sri. SNS Charitable Trust. The institution was established with the permission of the Government of Tamil Nadu and recognized by UGC. It is a self-financing, co-educational, college and performs its academic duties with a motto of Sincerity, Nobility and Service (SNS). The college is located in a rural area on Sathy (NH-209) road at Coimbatore.

It offers fourteen undergraduate courses, six postgraduate courses and seven research programmes. Four departments of the college namely Mech., CSE, ECE & IT are accredited by the National Board of Accreditation (NBA).

== Undergraduate degree courses (B.E./B.Tech.) ==
- Aerospace Engineering
- Aeronautical Engineering (Lateral)
- Agricultural Engineering
- Automobile Engineering
- Artificial Intelligence and Machine Learning
- Bio-Medical Engineering
- Civil Engineering
- Computer Science and Engineering
- Electrical & Electronics Engineering
- Electronics and Communication Engineering
- Electronics and Instrumentation Engineering
- Mechatronics engineering
- Information Technology
- Mechanical Engineering
- Computer science and technology

== Postgraduate courses ==
- Master of Business Administration (MBA)
- Master of Computer Applications (MCA)
- M.E. Computer Science and Engineering
- M.E. Communication Systems
- M.Tech. Information Technology
- M.E. VLSI

== Research Programme (Ph.D.) ==
- Mechanical Engineering
- Information Technology
- Electronics and Communication Engineering
- Electrical and Electronics Engineering
- Computer Science Engineering
- Civil Engineering
- Business Administration.

== Controversy ==
=== Sexual harassment allegation and student strike (2018) ===
In September 2018, Dr. SN Subramanian, chairman of the SNS Group of Educational Institutions, was involved in a widely publicized controversy following the leak of a hidden-camera video appearing to show him sexually harassing a female staff member. The victim filed a formal complaint at the All Women’s Police Station (AWPS) in Thudiyalur, alleging a prolonged period of harassment.

The revelation sparked immediate disciplinary unrest, culminating in a large-scale student strike at the college gates. More than 300 students, supported by the Students' Federation of India (SFI), blocked the main entrance and the road in front of the college to demand stern action against the chairman. The strike escalated into violence, with protesters hurling stones and smashing window panes, eventually requiring police intervention to allow 15 college buses to exit the premises after they were blocked at the gate by striking students.

=== 2022 Silver Jubilee Event stampede ===
In October 2022, a cultural event organized at Dr SNS Rajalakshmi College of Arts and Science to celebrate its silver jubilee became a subject of controversy regarding safety protocols and crowd control. Despite an attendance of approximately 10,000 students, local police stated that the organizers had failed to take necessary steps to manage the influx of people. The police further noted that they had neither formally approved nor denied permission for the event, highlighting a lapse in administrative coordination that led to a chaotic environment during the performance of music director Yuvan Shankar Raja.

=== 2024 campus assault and arrests ===
In June 2024, a violent incident occurred at the SNS College of Technology main gate, where students were assaulted on campus. Six individuals, including a minor, were arrested by the Coimbatore police in connection with the attack. The investigation revealed that the attackers had utilized outsiders armed with weapons to carry out the assault on fellow students, leading to significant concerns regarding campus security and the monitoring of unauthorized individuals on institutional premises.

=== 2025 student road rampage ===
On July 28, 2025, five students from a SNS engineering college in were involved in a serious road accident when their sedan crashed into a tamarind tree on the Coimbatore-Sathyamangalam Road. The students, who hailed from various districts, sustained multiple injuries and were hospitalized for treatment. The vehicle sustained significant damage upon impact during the late-night incident and the students were believed to be under alcohol and drug influence.

=== 2026 auto show accident and public criticism ===
On March 3, 2026, severe safety violations occurred during an 'auto show' event held at the institution's technology campus. During the exhibition, while students were performing stunts with modified vehicles, a Thar Jeep lost control and crashed into more than ten two-wheelers parked in the vicinity.

Two female students standing nearby narrowly escaped with their lives during the crash. Following the viral spread of the incident's footage on social media, the institution faced intense public backlash. Netizens and social media users accused the college management of organizing such dangerous stunt events primarily to gain social media views and promotional visibility at the expense of student safety. Further criticism was directed at the lack of adequate safety barriers or supervisory officials present during the high-speed maneuvers.
