= Jerusalem College of Engineering, Chennai =

Engineering college in Chennai, Tamil Nadu, India

Jerusalem College of Engineering
- ஜெருசலம் பொறியியல் கல்லூரி
- Type: Private engineering college
- Established: 1995
- Parent institution: Jerusalem Education Trust
- Academic affiliations: Anna University
- Location: Chennai, Tamil Nadu, India
- Campus: Urban
- Website: jerusalemengg.ac.in

Jerusalem College of Engineering (JCE) is a private engineering college in Chennai, Tamil Nadu, India. Established in 1995 under the Jerusalem Education Trust, the institution offers undergraduate and postgraduate programmes in engineering, technology and management. The University Grants Commission granted the college autonomous status in 2019, and it is affiliated with Anna University.

== History ==
Jerusalem College of Engineering was established in 1995 under the Jerusalem Education Trust. The institution received autonomous status from the University Grants Commission in 2019, with the status listed for the 2019–2020 to 2028–2029 period.

== Academics ==
Jerusalem College of Engineering is affiliated with Anna University and was granted autonomous status by the University Grants Commission in 2019. The college is approved by the All India Council for Technical Education.

=== Accreditation ===
The National Board of Accreditation lists undergraduate programmes at Jerusalem College of Engineering among its accredited programmes, with accreditation periods varying by programme.

The college states that it is accredited by the National Assessment and Accreditation Council (NAAC).

=== Academic collaborations ===
In 2015, Jerusalem College of Engineering was among the institutions selected to participate in EML Omnibus, an initiative through which professors from the Indian Institute of Technology Madras delivered lectures at private colleges.

== Courses offered ==
=== Undergraduate programmes ===
- B.E. Biomedical Engineering
- B.E. Civil Engineering
- B.E. Computer Science and Engineering
- B.E. Computer Science and Engineering (Artificial Intelligence and Machine Learning)
- B.E. Computer Science and Engineering (Cyber Security)
- B.E. Electrical and Electronics Engineering
- B.E. Electronics and Communication Engineering
- B.Tech. Artificial Intelligence and Data Science
- B.Tech. Computer Science and Business Systems
- B.Tech. Information Technology

=== Postgraduate programmes ===
- M.E. Applied Electronics
- M.E. Computer Science and Engineering
- M.E. Construction Engineering and Management
- M.E. Power Electronics and Drives
- Master of Business Administration (MBA)
- Master of Business Administration (Hospital Administration)

== Research and facilities ==
The college has research centres recognised by Anna University in Civil Engineering, Electrical and Electronics Engineering, Electronics and Communication Engineering, and Chemistry.

In November 2025, the college inaugurated an AICTE–JCE IDEA Lab intended to support experimentation, prototyping and interdisciplinary learning.

== Student activities and achievements ==
In November 2022, Jerusalem College of Engineering hosted the Mrs Meera Memorial International FIDE-rated Open chess championship. The event was won by R. Ilamparthi, who received a cash prize of ₹25,000.

In June 2026, a team of students from the college secured second place in a competition on underwater robotic vehicle innovation held at the National Institute of Ocean Technology in Chennai. The team received a prize of ₹75,000 for its prototype.
