= Saveetha Engineering College =

College in Tamil Nadu, India

Coordinates: 13.025898°N 80.016443°E

SEC
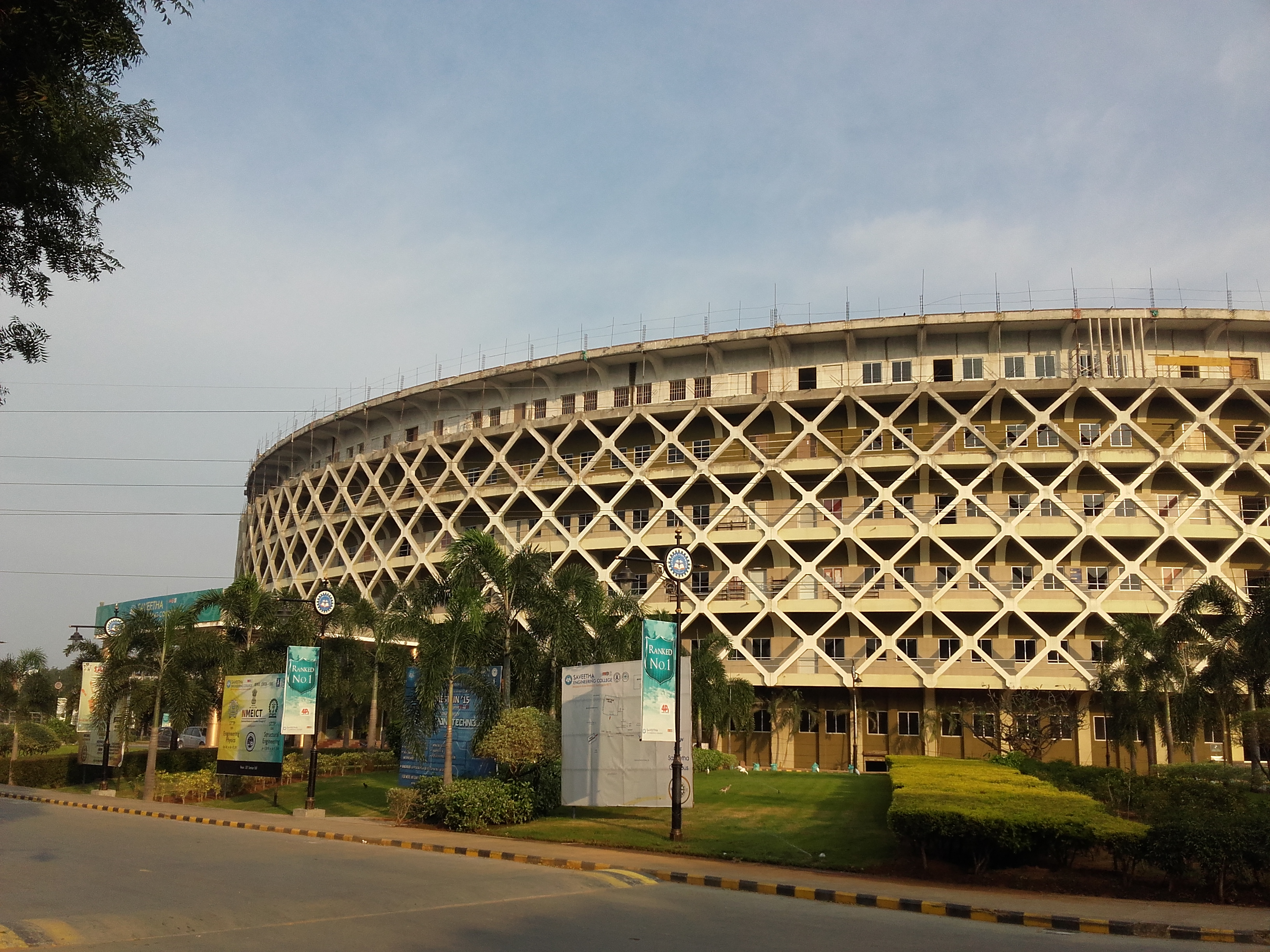
- Other name: SEC
- Motto: BE The Best
- Type: Autonomous College
- Established: 2001
- Affiliations: Anna University
- President: Dr. N. M. Veeraiyan
- Principal: Prof.(Dr). Duraipandiyan. M.E, Ph.D.,
- Dean: Prof. (Dr.) Chamundeshwari, M.E, Ph.D.,
- Academic staff: 354
- Administrative staff: 288
- Students: 4339
- Undergraduates: 4680
- Postgraduates: 483
- Doctoral students: 100
- Location: Chennai, Tamil Nadu, India
- Website: www.saveetha.ac.in

Saveetha Engineering College is a co-educational Institution. The college is affiliated with Anna University, Chennai, the largest technical university in India. Saveetha Engineering College is granted Autonomous status by University Grants Commission (UGC)., Affiliated to Anna University located in Chennai, India. It was founded in 2001 by the Saveetha Medical and Educational Trust, a registered charitable society. Approved by the All India Council for Technical Education (AICTE), a statutory body of the Government of India, and also by the Government of Tamil Nadu. The campus is facing Chembarambakkam lake on the Chennai-Bangalore National Highway (NH4), Thandalam, Kancheepuram District, Chennai, Pin: 602105. Located about 8 km (5.0 mi) from Poonamalee township.

== Academics ==
Saveetha Engineering College offers undergraduate, postgraduate, and doctoral programmes in engineering and management. As of 2025, the college provides 12 full-time undergraduate engineering courses, including Agricultural Engineering, Artificial Intelligence and Data Science, Biomedical Engineering, Civil Engineering, Computer Science and Engineering, Electronics and Communication Engineering, Electrical and Electronics Engineering, Information Technology, Mechanical Engineering, Medical Electronics, and Bioinformatics. The institution also offers postgraduate programmes such as Master of Business Administration (MBA) and Master of Engineering (M.E.), along with opportunities for doctoral research (Ph.D.).

== Rankings ==
University rankings

Engineering – India
- NIRF (2024): 201-300

The National Institutional Ranking Framework (NIRF) ranked the college in 201-300 band in the engineering rankings in 2024.
