= Easwari Engineering College =

Institute in Tamil Nadu, India

- Type: Engineering college
- Established: 1996
- Affiliations: Anna University, AICTE
- Principal: Dr. P. Deiva Sundari
- Location: Chennai, Tamil Nadu, India; 12°59′12″N 79°58′19″E
- Website: srmeaswari.ac.in

Easwari Engineering College (EEC), is an engineering college located in Ramapuram, Chennai, Tamil Nadu, India, located right next to SRM University and SRM Dental College is a member of the Sri Ramaswamy Memorial (SRM) Group of Educational Institutions for higher learning. The college was instituted in 1996 and is affiliated with Anna University since 2002, now autonomous (since 2019).

== Academics ==
As of 2019, the college offers thirteen undergraduate and four postgraduate programs covering engineering and technology and management. All the faculty members are student friendly. The college is affiliated to Anna University and approved by the All India Council for Technical Education (AICTE).

=== Departments ===
The college comprises thirteen engineering departments, seven science and humanities departments and an MBA department.

UG courses departments

- Mechanical Engineering
- Computer Science Engineering
- Electrical and Electronics Engineering
- Electronics and Communication Engineering
- Electronics and Instrumentation Engineering
- Information Technology
- Civil Engineering
- Automobile Engineering
- BioMedical Engineering
- Robotics & Automation Engineering
- Artificial Intelligence and Data Science
- Artificial Intelligence and Machine Learning
- CSE(Cyber Security)

Science and humanities departments

- Chemistry
- English
- Maths
- Physics
- Library
- Physical Education
- Counselling

PG courses

- Master of Business Administration
- Master of Engineering (Computer Science and Engineering)
- Master of Engineering (Communication Systems)
- Master of Engineering (Embedded Systems)

== Campus ==
Easwari Engineering College has seven multi-storeyed academic blocks, namely the Main block (CSE/EEE/IT), Mechanical engineering block, Electronics block I & II (ECE/EIE), Civil & P.G. block (MBA & Civil).

Other facilities within the campus include food courts and canteens, supermarket and departmental stores, telecom facilities, a bank with ATM (City Union Bank), DTP and Internet centers. The main library is housed in the P.G. Block.

Student support activities, 1. Campus life 2. Placement 3. Value added course 4. Entrepreneurship 5. Pride activities 6. Foreign Language 7. Sports 8. Student clubs
