= Mepco Schlenk Engineering College =

Engineering college in Tamil Nadu, India

Coordinates: 9°31′28.8″N 77°51′19.4″E

- Motto: Work is Worship
- Type: Private
- Established: 1984
- Affiliations: Autonomous (Anna University)
- President: A. Ramamurthy
- Vice-president: Yennarkay R. Rajarathnam
- Principal: S. Arivazhagan
- Students: 3591
- Undergraduates: 3398
- Location: Virudhunagar, Tamil Nadu, India
- Campus: 195 acres (0.79 km^{2})
- Website: http://www.mepcoeng.ac.in/

Main Block, Mepco Schlenk Engineering College

Mepco Schlenk Engineering College is an autonomous engineering college located in Virudhunagar near Sivakasi, Tamil Nadu, India. It was founded on 17 October 1984. It is an ISO9001:2015 certified institution. It is sponsored by the Mepco Schlenk Charities, a social welfare organization of the Metal Powder Company Limited, Thirumangalam and its German collaborator, Schlenk. The college was affiliated with Madurai Kamaraj University, Madurai until 2002 and later with Anna University, Chennai, but since 2012 it has been affiliated with Anna University of Technology, Chennai.

The medium of instruction is English for all courses, examinations, seminar presentations and project reports.

== Department ==
Department	Establishment	Sanctioned Intake
Civil Engineering	1984	120
Electrical and Electronics Engineering	1984	120
Electronics and Communication Engineering	1984	180
Computer and Science Engineering	1987	180
Mechanical Engineering	1993	120
Information Technology	2001	120
Biotechnology	2002	60
Biomedical Engineering	2020	60
Artificial Intelligence and Data Science	2020	120

== Rankings ==
University and college rankings

General – India
- NIRF (Overall) (2024): 151-200

Engineering – India
- NIRF (2024): 101-150

The National Institutional Ranking Framework (NIRF) ranked it in the 101-150 band among engineering colleges in 2024 and in 151-200 overall.
