= Chennai Institute of Technology =

Private engineering college in Chennai, India

- Motto: Transforming Lives, Empowering Futures
- Type: Private engineering college
- Established: 2010
- Affiliations: Anna University, Chennai
- Chairman: Shri P. Sriram
- Principal: Dr A. Ramesh
- Students: 2,500 (approx.)
- Undergraduates: 1,500 (approx.)
- Postgraduates: 54 (approx.)
- Location: Kundrathur, Chennai, Tamil Nadu, India
- Campus: Suburban, 40 acres
- Colors: White and blue
- Website: www.citchennai.edu.in

Chennai Institute of Technology (CIT) is a private engineering college located in Kundrathur, Chennai, Tamil Nadu, India. Established in 2010, the institution is affiliated with Anna University and approved by the All India Council for Technical Education (AICTE). The college operates under the Parthasarathy Seeniammal Educational Trust and offers undergraduate, postgraduate, and doctoral programs in engineering and technology disciplines.

== History ==
Chennai Institute of Technology was established in 2010 in Kundrathur, a suburb located on the southwestern outskirts of Chennai, Tamil Nadu. The institution was founded by the Parthasarathy Seeniammal Educational Trust with the objective of providing technical education in engineering and technology fields in the Chennai metropolitan region.

The college commenced academic operations with four undergraduate engineering programs: Civil Engineering, Mechanical Engineering, Electronics & Communication Engineering, and Computer Science & Engineering. The initial student intake was 240 students across these core engineering disciplines.

In 2015, CIT expanded its academic portfolio by introducing three additional undergraduate programs: Electrical & Electronics Engineering, Information Technology, and Mechatronics Engineering.

In 2018, Anna University granted autonomous status to Chennai Institute of Technology. This autonomy allows CIT to design its own curriculum, conduct examinations, and award degrees within the framework established by Anna University.

In 2020, CIT established centers focusing on artificial intelligence, machine learning, and data science applications in collaboration with industry partners.

== Campus and infrastructure ==
The Chennai Institute of Technology campus is situated on approximately 40 acres in Kundrathur, positioned about 25 kilometers from central Chennai. The campus houses academic blocks containing lecture halls and specialized laboratories for various engineering disciplines. The central library contains over 50,000 volumes and provides access to journals through both physical and digital collections.

The institution provides on-campus accommodation through separate hostel facilities for male and female students, with capacities of 1,500 and 1,000 students respectively.

Sports infrastructure includes outdoor spaces for football and cricket, along with indoor facilities for badminton and basketball.

Chennai Institute of Technology operates a transportation network of 80+ AC/Non-AC buses connecting the campus to various locations across Chennai, with major pickup points including Tambaram, T. Nagar, and Guindy.

== Academic programs ==
Chennai Institute of Technology follows a semester-based credit system in accordance with University Grants Commission (UGC) guidelines and Anna University regulations. All academic programs are approved by AICTE and affiliated with Anna University, Chennai.

=== Undergraduate programs ===
The institution offers Bachelor of Engineering (B.E.) and Bachelor of Technology (B.Tech.) degrees across twelve engineering disciplines:

- B.E. in Civil Engineering
- B.E. in Mechanical Engineering
- B.E. in Computer Science and Engineering
- B.E. in Electrical and Electronics Engineering
- B.E. in Electronics and Communication Engineering
- B.E. in Electronics engineering (VLSI Design and Technology specialization)
- B.E in Electronics and communication engineering (Advanced Communication Technology specialization)
- B.E. in Mechatronics Engineering
- B.E. in Biomedical Engineering
- B.Tech. in Information Technology
- B.Tech. in Computer Science and Business Systems
- B.Tech. in Artificial Intelligence and Data Science
- B.E. in Computer Science and Engineering (Artificial Intelligence & Machine Learning specialization)
- B.E. in Computer Science and Engineering (Cyber Security specialization)

All undergraduate programs span four years and incorporate mandatory industry internships and project-based learning components.

=== Postgraduate programs ===
Chennai Institute of Technology offers Master of Engineering (M.E.) programs in:

- M.E. in Computer-Aided Design and Manufacturing (CAD/CAM)
- M.E. in Computer Science and Engineering
- M.E. in Applied Electronics

The institution also provides Master of Business Administration (MBA) and Master of Computer Applications (MCA) programs. Admission to postgraduate programs is conducted through the Tamil Nadu Common Entrance Test (TANCET).

=== Doctoral programs ===
Anna University recognizes Chennai Institute of Technology as a research center authorized to offer Ph.D. programs in six disciplines:

- Electrical & Electronics Engineering
- Electronics & Communication Engineering
- Computer Science & Engineering
- Mechanical Engineering
- Civil Engineering
- Management Studies

== Rankings and accreditation ==
The National Institutional Ranking Framework (NIRF) has ranked Chennai Institute of Technology in the 101–150 band for engineering institutions and 151–200 band for overall institutional ranking in 2024.

Chennai Institute of Technology holds approval from AICTE for all its technical programs and maintains affiliation with Anna University for degree conferment.
