= Kongu Engineering College =

Autonomous college in Tamil Nadu, India

- Type: Autonomous
- Established: 1984; 42 years ago
- Accreditation: NAAC
- Academic affiliations: Anna university
- Principal: Dr.V.Balusamy
- Undergraduates: 6940
- Postgraduates: 780
- Location: Perundurai, Erode district, Tamil Nadu, India; 11.2739°N 77.6071°E
- Academic term: Semester
- Website: www.kongu.ac.in

Kongu Engineering College is an autonomous engineering college located at Perundurai, Erode district in the state of Tamil Nadu in India. It is affiliated to Anna University and accredited 'A++' Grade by National Assessment and Accreditation Council.

== Courses ==
There are 14 courses offered in B.E./B.Tech.

- B.E. Civil Engineering
- B.E. Mechanical Engineering
- B.E. Computer Science Engineering
- B.E. Automobile Engineering
- B.E. Mechatronics Engineering
- B.E. Electronics and Communication Engineering
- B.E. Electrical and Electronics Engineering
- B.E. Electronics and Instrumentation Engineering
- B.Tech. Chemical Engineering
- B.Tech. Information Technology
- B.Tech. Food Technology
- B.E. Computer Science & Design
- B.Tech. Artificial Intelligence and Machine Learning
- B.Tech. Artificial Intelligence and Data Science

In the Applied Science category, there are three undergraduate and three postgraduate degrees offered.

There Applied Science Courses are:

- B.Sc. Software Engineering
- B.Sc. Information Technology
- B.Sc. Computer Technology
- M.Sc. Software Systems
- Master of Computer Application
- Master Of Business Administration

Co-curricular and extracurricular activities are run through associations, clubs, societies and students' chapters of professional bodies. They are managed by representatives of students and are monitored by the faculty.

== Campus ==
The institution is situated on a campus measuring 167 acres (68 ha).

=== Library ===
The college library was established in 1984 and its equipped with RFID facility.

=== Accommodation ===
The college has an on-campus guest house, alumni guest house, seven boys' hostels and four girls' hostels.

== Awards ==
In 2003 the Technology Business Incubator at Kongu Engineering College won the National Award for Technology Business Incubators, an award given by the Department of Science and Technology's National Science & Technology Entrepreneurship Development Board.

== Rankings ==
College rankings

Engineering – India
- NIRF (2021): 164

Kongu Engineering College was ranked 164 among engineering colleges by the National Institutional Ranking Framework (NIRF) in 2021.
