= Velalar College of Engineering and Technology =

Indian engineering college

Coordinates: 11.323333°N 77.675117°E

- Type: Autonomous
- Established: 2001
- Academic affiliation: Anna University
- Principal: RJSKRMS
- Location: Erode, Erode district, Tamil Nadu, India
- Academic term: Semester
- Website: www.velalarengg.ac.in

Velalar College of Engineering and Technology is an engineering college located at Thindal, Erode district in the state of Tamil Nadu in India. The College is affiliated to Anna University, approved by All India Council of Technical Education (AICTE), accredited 'A' Grade by National Assessment and Accreditation Council and five programmes (B.E. – BME, CSE, ECE, EEE and B.Tech.-IT) are accredited by National Board of Accreditation (NBA).

== Courses ==
Eight degrees are offered in B.E./B.Tech:

- B.Tech. Artificial intelligence and data science
- B.E. Artificial Intelligence and Machine Learning
- B.E. Biomedical Engineering
- B.E. Computer Science Engineering
- B.E. Civil Engineering
- B.E. Electronics and Communication Engineering
- B.E. Electrical and Electronics Engineering
- B.E. Mechanical Engineering
- B.Tech. Information Technology
- B.E. Medical Electronics

Six postgraduate degrees are offered including four M.E. programmes :

- M.E. Computer Science and Engineering
- M.E. Applied Electronics
- M.E. Embedded System Technologies
- Master of Business Administration (MBA)
- Master of Computer Application (MCA).

== Admissions ==
Admission is through Tamil Nadu Engineering. Admission is based on ranking 12 standard exam results, which are facilitated by Directorate Of Technical Education. M.B.A., M.C.A. and M.E. admissions are based on ranking in TANCET examination conducted by Anna University.

== Scholarships ==
Scholarships of 1.85 crore were given to 185 students who passed the qualifying examination in 2020.
