= Velammal Engineering College =

College in Chennai, India

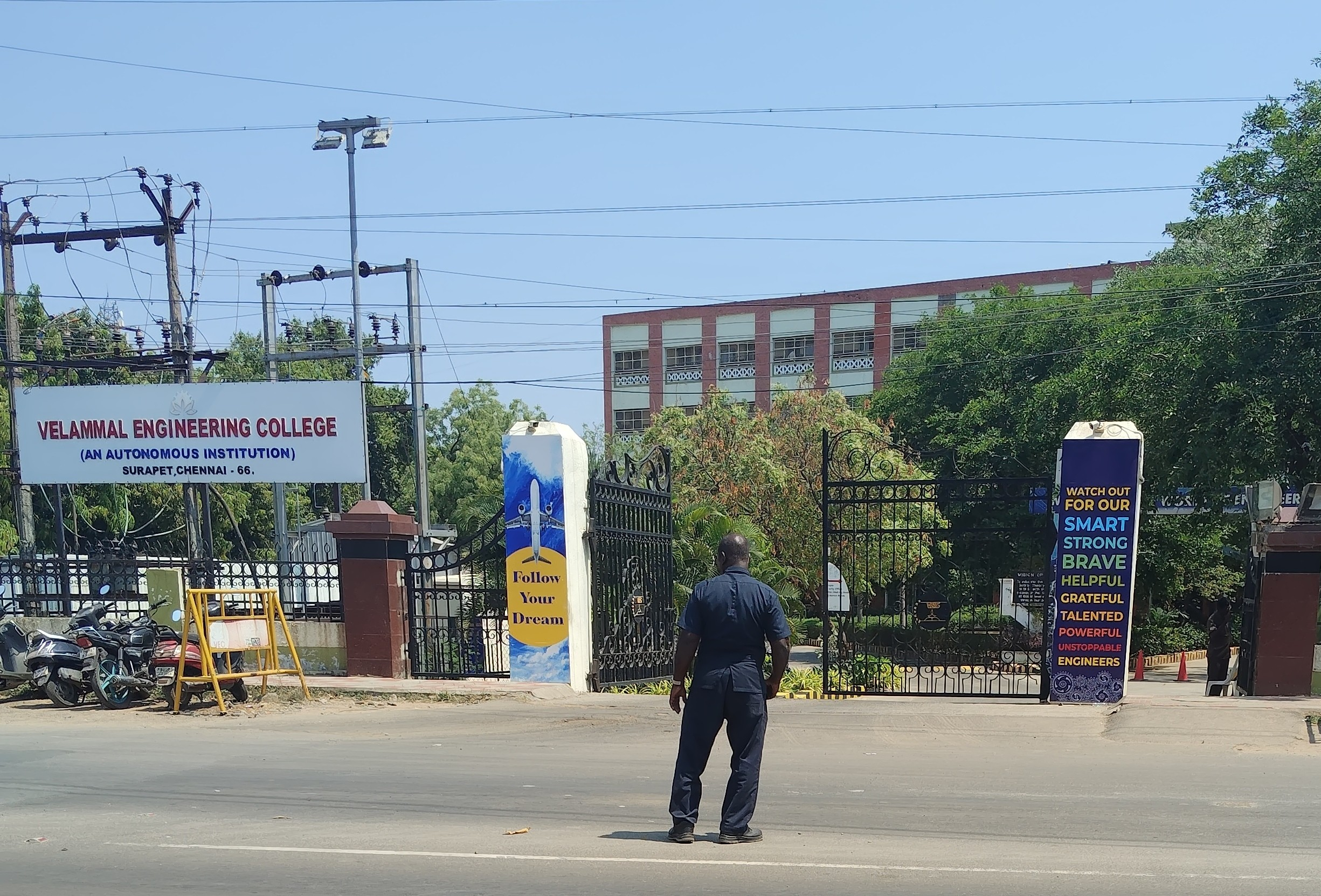
- Entrance of Velammal College from Redhills Main road
- Motto in English: Dedication, Determination and Distinction
- Type: Autonomous, Private
- Established: 1995
- Affiliations: Anna University, Chennai
- Chairman: Dr M V Muthuramalingam
- Principal: Dr Sathish Kumar Shanmugam
- Faculty: ~1250
- Students: ~28000
- Undergraduates: ~22400
- Postgraduates: ~5500
- Location: Ambattur-Redhills Road, Surapet, Chennai, Tamil Nadu, 600066, India; 13.1500°N 80.1917°E
- Campus: 23 acres (92,000 m^{2})
- Nickname: VEC
- Website: velammal.edu.in

Velammal Engineering College, is a private institution located in Chennai, India. Established in 1995, it was the first private engineering College to obtain an ISO 9001:2000 certificate. According to Times Engineering Survey by The Times Group, Velammal Engineering College was ranked 65th of Top 175 All India Engineering Institute rankings, and 64th of Top 125 Private Engineering Institute Rankings, in the year 2026.

== History ==
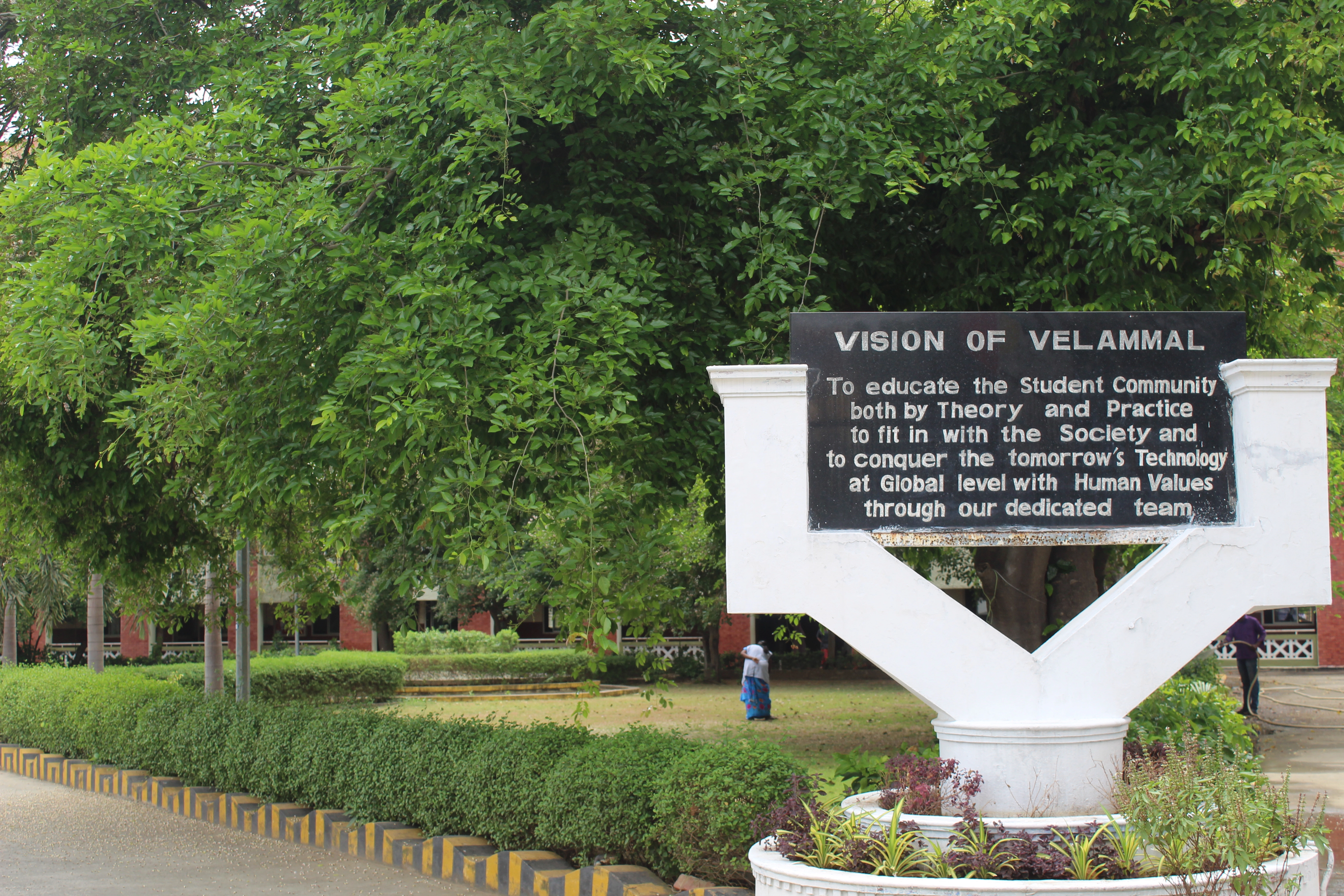
Vision of Velammal College

The Velammal Educational Trust is a registered non-minority service organization established in the year 1986 by Thiru. M.V. Muthuramalingam.

Velammal Engineering College was established in the year 1995–96. It is a self-financing Autonomous college, affiliated to Anna University and approved by All India Council for Technical Education (AICTE) also obtained NBA, NAAC, ISO Accreditation.

In 2010, National Instruments and Velammal Engineering College established a center of excellence for innovation in the field of virtual instrumentation.

== Departments ==
All programmes have been Accredited by the NBA.

UG Programmes:

Departments (B.E/B.Tech)	Intake of students per year
Computer Science & Engineering	240
Computer Science & Engineering with Cybersecurity	60
Artificial Intelligence & Data Science	120
Information Technology	120
Electrical and Electronics Engineering	60
Electronics and Instrumentation Engineering	60
Electronics and Communication Engineering	120
Mechanical Engineering	120
Civil Engineering	60
Automobile Engineering	60

PG Programmes:

Departments (M.E/Masters)	Intake of students per year
M.E. Computer Science & Engineering	18
Master of Business Administration	60
M.E. Power Systems Engineering	20

Ph.D. Programmes:
Departments
Computer Science and Engineering
Electrical and Electronics Engineering
Electronics and Communication Engineering
Information Technology
Mechanical Engineering
Physics
