= Karpagam College of Engineering =

Institute in Tamil Nadu, India

Karapagam College of Engineering
- Motto: Rediscover-Refine-Redefine
- Type: Private (autonomous)
- Established: 2000
- Affiliations: Anna University
- Principal: Prof. Dr Karthigaikumar
- Location: Coimbatore, Tamil Nadu
- Campus: Suburban
- Nickname: KCE
- Website: kce.ac.in

Karpagam College of Engineering is an autonomous institution of the Karpagam Charity Trust established in the year 2000. The college is one of the Karpagam Educational Institutions, affiliated with the Anna University of Chennai and approved by AICTE. It is also accredited by NBA, TCS, Microsoft and Wipro. The programmes offered by the college include nine for undergraduates and five for postgraduates.

== History ==
The Karpagam Charity Trust was founded in 1989 by Dr. R. Vasantha Kumar, a renowned philanthropist and industrialist. Initially the trust established Karpagam Arts and Science College in 1995 followed by Karpagam Polytechnic College in 1998, while Karpagam College of Engineering was started in 2000.

Karpagam College of Engineering was conferred with the autonomous status by the Anna University in the academic year 2007-2008.

== Location ==
10.8801° N, 77.0224° E

The campus is 26 km from Coimbatore, in the Myleripalayam village, Othakalmandapam post-641032.

== Academics ==
=== Courses offered ===
==== Undergraduate programmes ====
- B.E. Civil Engineering
- B.E. Mechanical Engineering
- B.E. Computer Science and Engineering
- B.E. Electronics and Communication Engineering
- B.E. Electrical and Electronics Engineering
- B.E. Computer Science and Engineering (Cyber security)
- B.Tech Artificial Intelligence and Data Science
- B.Tech Information Technology

==== Postgraduate programmes ====
- MBA - Master of Business Administration
- MCA - Master of Computer Application
- M.E. Computer Science and Engineering
- M.E. CSE (Bigdata Analytics)

==== Technical Academy ====
The college offers special corporate-oriented technical training to the students with the establishment of an exclusive academy for technical courses viz., C Programming, OOP, Data Structure, Java Programming, Operating System, Database and Management System, Data and Algorithm Analysis, Advanced Java Programming, Unix/shell Programming.

==== ES Academy ====
The electrical and electronics oriented programmes offer additional in-depth knowledge to the students in an academy for the courses on microprocessors and microcontrollers, electronic circuits, and digital electronics.

=== Placement ===
The placement cell of Karpagam College of Engineering started its effective functioning from October 2003, with a mission that graduates of Karpagam Educational Institutions should be ready to face the corporate scenario with self-confidence.

The recruiters list includes Microsoft, Amazon, IBM, HP, Zoho Corporation, Infosys, EMC Corporation, Oracle, Wipro, Tech Mahindra, CTS, TCS, HCL, Accenture, Odessa, Global Edge, L&T Info Tech, Soliton, i-Nautix, and i-Gate.

=== Student life ===
==== Clubs ====
The clubs initiated for student activities in the campus include Robotics Club, ISTE Student Chapter, KCE Electronics Club, KCE-SAE Collegiate Club, Mini Bike and Go-Kart Car Club, KCE-CSI Student Branch, KCE-ISOI, KCE Software club, KCE- Product Development Club and KCE-Eco Care Club.

==== Extra-curricular ====
Extensive playing facilities are provided for the students with an area of six acres. Outdoor courts have been laid for games such as basketball, cricket and football, whilst indoor games such as carom, chess and table tennis are facilitated within the buildings, alongside a gymnasium. The college also supports the National Service Scheme and Youth Red Cross.

==== Symposiums ====
The department-wise symposiums are conducted every year to encourage and kindle the engineering spirits of students Dhruva (all department).

==== Cultural activity ====
A cultural festival, KonCurEnza, is celebrated every year in order to bring out the hidden talents of the students. The events are organised to encourage the youth in arts and literature and the best performers are awarded.

=== Infrastructure ===
The campus consists of:

- computer laboratories that provide full-time internet access for the users and laboratories of each core department that provides genuine facilities for practical observance
- vast seminar halls
- a central library with around 65,984 books plus around 6191 numbers of back volumes and 3057 projects and 3137 CDs from various branches of engineering and technology
- a well maintained hostel with comfortable accommodation
- a cafeteria
- a store that satisfies daily necessities
- a fleet of 20 buses for the convenience of the faculty members and the students
- 10 centres of excellence, namely the IBM Centre of Excellence, Infosys Campus Connect, EMC Corporation, Oracle Workforce Development Centre, National Instruments LabView Academy, B&R Centre of Excellence, MEMS Centre of Excellence, Wipro Mission 10X programme, Microsoft Centre of Excellence and the Tech Mahindra Centre of Excellence for Infrastructure Management Services
