= Sri Ramakrishna Engineering College =

Autonomous engineering college in Tamil Nadu, India

- Motto: Enlightenment through Education
- Type: Private Engineering (Autonomous Institution)
- Established: 1994; 32 years ago
- Founder: Sevaratna R. Venkatesalu
- Affiliations: Anna University, Chennai
- Principal: Dr.A.Soundarrajan
- Location: Coimbatore, Tamil Nadu, India - 641022
- Nickname: SREC
- Website: http://www.srec.ac.in

Sri Ramakrishna Engineering College (SREC) is an autonomous Engineering college in India founded by Sevaratna R. Venkatesalu. It is affiliated with the Anna University in Chennai, and approved by the All India Council for Technical Education (AICTE) of New Delhi. It is accredited by the NBA (National Board of Accreditation) for most of its courses and by the Government of Tamil Nadu.

== History ==
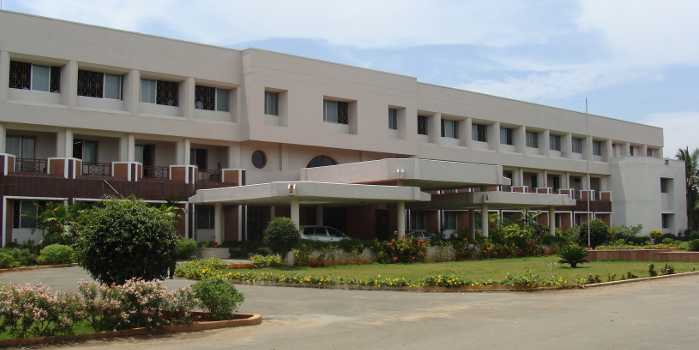
College Entrance

The college was founded in the year 1994 by Philanthropist and Industrialist makkal selvan Dr. R. Venkatesalu. It provides various undergraduate and postgraduate courses in engineering and other technical streams. The college attained its autonomous status in 2007-2008 when Anna University was split into six different universities. SREC is one of many institutions managed by SNR Sons and daughter Charitable Trust, founded by makkal selvan Dr. R. Venkatesalu. The college covers a total area of 45 acres.

== Academics ==
=== Undergraduate Courses ===
- B.E. Aeronautical Engineering
- B.E. Biomedical Engineering.
- B.E. Civil Engineering
- B.E. Computer Science Engineering
- B.E. Electrical and Electronics Engineering
- B.E. Electronics and Communication Engineering
- B.E. Electronics and Instrumentation Engineering
- B.E. Mechanical Engineering
- B.E. Robotics and Automation
- B.Tech. Artificial Intelligence and Data Science
- B.Tech. Information Technology

=== Postgraduate courses ===
- M.E. Power Electronics and Drives
- M.E. Artificial Intelligence and Data Science
- M.E. Manufacturing Engineering
- M.E. Embedded Systems Technologies
- M.E. VLSI
- M.E. Nanoscience and Technology
- M.E. Control and Instrumentation Engineering
- Master of Business Administration.

=== Research Programmes (Bharathiar University) ===
- M.Phil. (Computer Science)
- Ph.D. (Computer Science Engineering programming).

== Admission procedure ==
=== For undergraduate programmes - first year of study ===
- Admissions are based on Single Window System
- Students ranked based on performance in +2 exam
- Admission for Management seats 35%

=== For undergraduate programmes - second year of study (Lateral entry) ===
- Strength – 10% of sanctioned seats in undergraduate programs
- As per DOTE/Anna University norms.

=== For MCA & MBA programmes ===
- Single Window admission
- Students ranked based on performance in qualifying Degree and TANCET as per Tamil Nadu government regulations
- Reservation policy as per Tamil Nadu Government Rules.

== Rankings ==
University and college rankings

Engineering – India
- NIRF (2023): 151-200

The NIRF ranked it in the 151-200 band among Engineering colleges in 2023.

== Location ==
It is located in Idikarai area, 4kms from Thudiyalur Bus stand. Listed as one of the famous academic institutions in Coimbatore district, Tamil Nadu.

== Student Associations ==
- Mechanical Engineering (MEQUEST)
- Electrical & Electronics Engineering Association
- Association of Electronics and Communication Engineering(ASELCOME)
- Association of Computer Science Engineering(ACE)
- Information Technology Engineer's Association(INTERACT)
- Association of Electronics and Instrumentation Engineering(AEINSTENS)
- Association of Biomedical Engineering
- Aeronautical Engineer's Association(AEA)
- Aeromodelling Club
- MCA(Merito CrAts)
- MBA(ZESTOR)
- Science & Humanities Association
- SREC Alumni Association
- Computer Society of India(CSI)

=== Non Technical ===
- Entrepreneurship Development Cell (EDC)
- English Literary Society (ELS)
- Tamil Mandram
- Fine Arts Club (FAC)
- Quiz club(Q'Zenith)
- Philately and Numismatics Club
- Red Ribbon Club
- Sports
- Nature Club
- Phoratz Club

== Library ==
The total area of the Library is 35172 Sq. ft (3269 sq. m) with a seating capacity of 100 General Reference: 40 Journals Section.

Total No.of Titles: 17273

Total no.of Volumes: 52221

=== Language Laboratory ===
Students can extensively use the Department of English and its Laboratory for learning Basic Interactive Communication skill practices, Vocabulary, Grammar, Pronunciation, Sentence Formation practices and TOEFL, GRE, GMAT and allied course practices. And also the department of English has numbers of Ph.D. holding lectures to guide the students.

== Transport and Food Court ==
The College has 32 buses for commutation. The buses ply to several destinations located at the outskirts of the Coimbatore City.

== Medical Facilities ==
A Health Centre is functioning on the campus to offer medical care. In case of emergency, a student will be taken to Sri Ramakrishna Hospital for treatment through 24hr ambulance facility in the campus.

== Hostels ==
Now Four hostel blocks are available; Three blocks for men and One hostel block for women to accommodate and has a total Strength of 1,900 students.

== Placements ==
SREC Placement and Training Cell opens the campus recruitment season for all undergraduate and postgraduate students at the start of their final year at the institution. Multinational and national companies are typically invited by the Placement Officer (PO) and the departmental Placement Representatives (PRs), and mutually convenient dates are scheduled for the recruitment process.

== Sports ==
SREC hosts Soccer, Hockey, Cricket, Handball and athletics fields, Tennis courts, Volleyball courts, Basketball courts, and ball Badminton.
