= List of Tamil Nadu Government educational institutions =

== List of state universities of Tamil Nadu ==
No.	Name	Location	Date of establishment	Specialization	Section		Website
No.	Name	Location	Date of establishment	Specialization	2(f)	12(B)	Website
1	Alagappa University	Karaikudi	9 May 1985	Multidisciplinary	Yes	Yes	https://alagappauniversity.ac.in/
2	Anna University	Chennai	4 September 1978	Engineering, and Technology	Yes	Yes	https://www.annauniv.edu/
3	Annamalai University	Chidambaram	1 January 1929	Multidisciplinary	Yes	Yes	https://annamalaiuniversity.ac.in/
4	Bharathiar University	Coimbatore	February 1982	Multidisciplinary	Yes	Yes	https://b-u.ac.in/
5	Bharathidasan University	Tiruchirappalli	February 1982	Multidisciplinary	Yes	Yes	https://www.bdu.ac.in/
6	Madurai Kamaraj University	Madurai	1966	Multidisciplinary	Yes	Yes	https://mkuniversity.ac.in/
7	Manonmaniam Sundaranar University	Tirunelveli	7 September 1990	Multidisciplinary	Yes	Yes	https://www.msuniv.ac.in/
8	Mother Teresa Women's University	Kodaikanal	1984	Women only	Yes	Yes	https://www.motherteresawomenuniv.ac.in/
9	Periyar University	Salem	17 September 1997	Multidisciplinary	Yes	Yes	https://www.periyaruniversity.ac.in/
10	Tamil Nadu Agricultural University	Coimbatore	1906	Agriculture	Yes	Yes	https://tnau.ac.in/
11	Tamil Nadu Dr. J. Jayalalithaa Fisheries University	Nagapattinam	2012	Aquaculture, and Fisheries	Yes	Yes	https://www.tnjfu.ac.in/
12	Tamil Nadu National Law University	Tiruchirappalli	2012	Legal	Yes	Yes	https://www.tnnlu.ac.in/
13	Tamil Nadu Open University	Chennai	2002	Distance Education	Yes	Yes	https://tnou.ac.in/
14	Tamil Nadu Physical Education and Sports University	Chennai	15 September 2005	Physical Education, and Sports	Yes	No	https://www.tnpesu.org/
15	Tamil Nadu Teachers Education University	Chennai	1 July 2008	Teachers Education	Yes	Yes	https://www.tnteu.ac.in/
16	Tamil Nadu Veterinary and Animal Sciences University	Chennai	20 September 1989	Veterinary, and Animal Sciences	Yes	Yes	https://www.tanuvas.ac.in/
17	Tamil University	Thanjavur	15 September 1981	Tamil	Yes	Yes	https://www.tamiluniversity.ac.in/
18	The Tamil Nadu Dr. Ambedkar Law University	Chennai	20 September 1997	Legal	Yes	Yes	https://tndalu.ac.in/
19	The Tamil Nadu Dr. J. Jayalalithaa Music and Fine Arts University	Chennai	14 November 2013	Music, and Fine Arts	Yes	No	https://tnjjmfau.in/
20	The Tamil Nadu Dr. M.G.R. Medical University	Chennai	1989	Medical	Yes	Yes	https://www.tnmgrmu.ac.in/
21	Thiruvalluvar University	Vellore	October 2002	Multidisciplinary	Yes	Yes	https://www.tvu.edu.in/
22	University of Madras	Chennai	5 September 1857	Multidisciplinary	Yes	Yes	https://www.unom.ac.in/

== Arts & science colleges, Education Colleges ==
=== Bharathidasan University Tiruchirappalli - controlled college ===
==== Bharathidasan University Tiruchirappalli - affiliated Tamil Nadu Government's arts & science colleges ====
No.	College name	Location	District	Affiliation	Estd.	Weblink
1	Government Arts College, Karur (Autonomous College)	Karur	Karur district	Bharathidasan University	1965	https://gackarur.ac.in/
2	Government Arts College, Kulithalai	Ayyar Malai, Kulithalai	Karur district	Bharathidasan University	2009	https://gackulithalai.ac.in/
3	Government Arts and science College, Tharagampatti	Tharagampatti	Karur district	Bharathidasan University	2020	https://gaasct.ac.in/
4	Government Arts College, Ariyalur	Ariyalur	Ariyalur district	Bharathidasan University	1966	http://
5	Arignar Anna Government Arts College, Musiri	Musiri	Tiruchirappalli district	Bharathidasan University	1965	http://www.karurgovtartscollege.com/
6	Government Arts College, Thuvakudi, Tiruchirappalli	Thuvakudi	Tiruchirappalli district	Bharathidasan University	1969	http://www.gacmelur.com/
7	Periyar E.V.R. College, Tiruchirappalli (Autonomous College)	Tiruchirappalli	Tiruchirappalli district	Bharathidasan University	1966	https://periyarevrcollege.ac.in//
8	H. H. The Rajah's College, Pudukkottai	Pudukkottai	Pudukkottai district	Bharathidasan University	1946	http://hhrajahs.com/
9	Government College Arts College for Women, Pudukkottai	Pudukkottai	Pudukkottai district	Bharathidasan University	July 1969	http://www.gacwpdkt.ac.in//
10	Government College for Women, Kumbakonam	Kumbakonam	Thanjavur district	Bharathidasan University	1963	http://www.karurgovtartscollege.com/
11	Government College, Kumbakonam	Kumbakonam	Thanjavur district	Bharathidasan University	1969	http://www.gacmelur.com/
12	Rajah Serfoji Government Arts College (Autonomous College)	Thanjavur	Thanjavur district	Bharathidasan University	1966	http://rsgc.ac.in/
13	Kunthavai Nachiyaar Government Arts College for Women	Thanjavur	Thanjavur district	Bharathidasan University	1966	http://kngac.ac.in/
14	M.R. Government Arts College, Mannargudi	Mannargudi	Tiruvarur district	Bharathidasan University	1965	http://www.karurgovtartscollege.com/
15	Thiru.Vi.Ka. Government Arts College, Tiruvarur	Tiruvarur	Tiruvarur district	Bharathidasan University	1969	http://www.gacmelur.com/
16	Dharmapuram Gnanambigai Government Arts College for Women	Mayiladuthurai	Nagappattinam district	Bharathidasan University	1966	https://dggacollege.edu.in//
17	Government Arts and Science College	Manalmedu	Nagappattinam district	Bharathidasan University	2014	

==== Bharathidasan University Tiruchirappalli - university colleges ====
No.	Regional centre/campus or college name	Location	District	Affiliation	Estd.	Weblink	Status
1	Bharathidasan University BDU Palkalaiperur Campus (main campus), Tiruchirappalli	Tiruchirappalli	Tiruchirappalli district	Bharathidasan University	February 1982	http://www.bdu.ac.in/index1.php	University Main Campus
2	Bharathidasan University Khajamalai Campus Tiruchirappalli	Khajamalai	Tiruchirappalli district	Bharathidasan University	February 1982	http://www.bdu.ac.in/index1.php	University Main Campus
3	Bharathidasan University Constituent College Lalgudi	Lalgudi	Tiruchirappalli district	Bharathidasan University	February 2008	http://www.bdu.ac.in/colleges/lalgudi/index.php	University Constituent College
4	Bharathidasan University Constituent College Inam kulathur	Inam kulathur, Srirangam taluk	Tiruchirappalli district	Bharathidasan University	February 2008	http://www.bdu.ac.in/colleges/srirangam_taluk/	University Constituent College
5	Bharathidasan University Constituent Arts & Science College Nagapattinam	Kadambaadi, Nagapattinam	Nagapattinam district	Bharathidasan University	February 2008	http://www.bdu.ac.in/colleges/nagapattinam/	University Constituent College
6	Bharathidasan University Constituent Arts and science College (co-education) Nannilam	Nannilam	Tiruvarur district	Bharathidasan University	1 February 2012	http://www.bdu.ac.in/colleges/nannilam/	University Constituent College
7	Bharathidasan University College for Women Orathanadu	Orathanadu	Thanjavur district	Bharathidasan University	17 September 2006	http://www.bdu.ac.in/colleges/orathanadu/	University Constituent College
8	Bharathidasan University College Perambalur	Kurumbalur	Perambalur district	Bharathidasan University	17 September 2006	http://www.bdu.ac.in/colleges/perambalur/	University Constituent College
9	Bharathidasan University Model College Aranthangi	Aranthangi	Pudukkotai district	Bharathidasan University	22 September 2010	http://www.bdu.ac.in/colleges/aranthangi/	University Constituent College
10	Bharathidasan University Model College Vedaranyam	Vedaranyam	Nagapattinam district	Bharathidasan University	25 July 2011,	http://www.bdu.ac.in/colleges/vedaranyam/	University Constituent College
11	Bharathidasan University Model College Thiruthuraipoondi	Thiruthuraipoondi	Tiruvarur district	Bharathidasan University	18 July 2011	http://www.bdu.ac.in/colleges/thiruthuraipoondi/	University Constituent College

==== Manonmaniam Sundaranar University (MSU), Thirunelveli - affiliated Tamil Nadu Government's arts & science college ====
===== Tirunelveli District =====
- Govt arts and science college, Kadayanallur taluk, Tirunelveli district
- Government College of Arts & Science (Surandai), Surandai - 627 859, Tirunelveli district
- Rani Anna Government College for Women, Tirunelveli - 627 008
- Government arts and science College, Nagalapuram, 628904, Thoothukudi (DT)

==== Bharathiar University Coimbatore - Post Graduate Extension Centre ====
No.	Director	Regional centre/campus or college name	Location	District	Affiliation	Year of establishment
1	Dr. C. VADIVEL	Bharathiar University Post Graduate Extension Centre	Erode	Erode	Bharathiar University	2013

==== Bharathiar University Coimbatore - affiliated Tamil Nadu Government's arts & science colleges ====
No.	Regional centre/campus or college name	Location	District	Affiliation	Year of establishment
1	Chikkanna Government Arts College	college road	Tirupur	Bharathiar University	1966
2	Government Arts College	Udumalaipettai (Udumalpet)	Tirupur	Bharathiar University	1971
3	LRG Government Arts College For Women	palladam road	Tirupur	Bharathiar University	1987
4	Government Arts College	Stone House Hill	Udhagamandalam	Bharathiar University	1955
5	Government Arts College, Coimbatore	Government Arts College Road	Coimbatore	Bharathiar University	1950
6	Sardar Vallabhbhai Patel Institute of Textile Management	Peelamedu	Coimbatore	Bharathiar University	2006
7	Sri GVG Visalakshi College for Women	S.V. Mills (PO), Udumalpe	Tirupur	Bharathiar University	1952
8	Vellalar College for Women	Thindal	Erode	Bharathiar University	1970
9	Chikkaiah Naicker College	Veerappanchatram	Erode	Bharathiar University	1954

==== Periyar University, Salem - affiliated Tamil Nadu Government's arts & science colleges ====
===== Salem District =====
- Government Arts College (Autonomous), Salem - 636 007
- Government Arts College for co-ed, Salem - 636 116
- Periyar University College of Arts and Science College, Mettur
- Periyar University College of Arts and Science College, Idappadi

===== Krishnagiri District =====
- Government Arts and Science College for Women, Bargur - 635 104
- Government Arts College for Men, Krishnagiri - 635 001

===== Dharmapuri District =====
- Government Arts College, Dharmapuri - 636 705
- Government Arts and Science College, Harur- 636 903
- Government Arts and Science College, Pappireddipatti -636 905
- Government Arts and Science College, Pennagaram
- Government Arts and Science College For Women, Karimangalam K
- K.S.Rangasamy college of arts and science for women
- K.S.Rangasamy college of arts and science autonomous.

==== Annamalai University, Chidambaram - affiliated Tamil Nadu Government's arts & science colleges ====
===== Cuddalore District =====
- Periyar Arts College (Govt), Devanampttinam, Cuddalore - 607 001.
- Government Arts College, C. Mutlur, Chidambaram - Cuddalore Dt - 608 102
- Thiru Kolanjiyappar Government Arts College, Viruthachalam, Cuddalore Dt - 606 001

===== Thiruvannamalai District =====
- paramedical Colleges, - 604 407
- Government arts College, Thiruvannamalai
- Arignar Anna Government Arts College, Cheyyar - 604407

===== Vellore District =====
- Government Thirumagal Mill's College, Gudiyattam
- Muthrangam Government Arts College, Vellore - 632 002
- Ranipet District
- Arignar Anna Government Arts College for Women Walajapet - 632 513

===== Villupuram District =====
- Arignar Anna Government Arts College,

Villupuram - 605 602

- Thiru A. Govindasamy Government Arts College, Tindivanam- 604 002

===== Madurai Kamaraj University, Madurai - affiliated Tamil Nadu Government's arts & science colleges =====
No.	College name	Location	District	Affiliation	Estd.
1	Sri Meenakshi Government Arts College for Women (Autonomous)	Madurai	Madurai district	Madurai Kamaraj University	1965
2	Government Arts College Melur	Melur	Madurai district	Madurai Kamaraj University	1969
3	M.V.M.Government Arts College for Women	R. M. Colony post, Vedasandur Road, Dindigul	Dindigul district	Madurai Kamaraj University	1966
4	Aundipatti Government Arts College	Andipatti	Theni district	Madurai Kamaraj University	2002
5	Thirumangalam Government Arts College	Tirumangalam	Madurai district	Madurai Kamaraj University	2012
6	Mannar Thirumalai Naicker College	Pasumalai	Madurai district	Madurai Kamaraj University	1974

==== University of Madras - affiliated Tamil Nadu Government institutes ====
- Bharathi Women's College
- Dr. Ambedkar Government Arts College
- Presidency College, Chennai
- Quaid-e-Millath Government College for Women
- Queen Mary's College, Chennai
- Loganatha Narayanasamy Government Arts College
- Pachaiyappa's College
- Rajeswari Vedachalam Government Arts College, Kanchipuram
- Sri Subramaniya Swamy Govt Arts College, Tiruttani, Tiruvallur (DIST).
- Government College of Arts and Crafts, Chennai
- Government College of Architecture and Sculpture, Mamallapuram
- The Tamil Nadu Institute of Labour Studies
- King Institute of Preventive Medicine and Research

==== Tamil Nadu Government's arts & science colleges ====
No.	College name	Location	District	Affiliation	Estd.	Weblink
1	Government Arts College for Women, Sivagangai	Sivagangai	Sivagangai district	Alagappa University	27 August 1998	
2	Raja Doraisingam Government Arts College Sivagangi	Sivagangai	Sivagangai district	Alagappa University	28 August 1995	
3	V.S.S. Government Arts College Sivagangi	Pulankurichy, Tirupattur taluk	Sivagangai district	Alagappa University	11 August 1947	
4	Alagappa Government Arts College	Karaikudi	Sivagangai district	Alagappa University	28 August 1995	
5	Government Arts College for Women, Ramanathapuram	Ramanathapuram	Ramanathapuram district	Alagappa University	28 August 1995	
6	Government Arts College Paramakudi	Paramakudi	Ramanathapuram district	Alagappa University	28 August 1995	
7	Sethupathy Government Arts College Ramanathapuram	Ramanathapuram	Ramanathapuram district	Alagappa University	28 August 1995	

== Engineering & technology colleges ==
=== Anna University colleges ===
Anna University - Guindy, Chennai Circle:

No.	Main constituent campus	Location	District	Estd.	Status
1	College of Engineering, Guindy	Guindy	Chennai district	1794	University department
2	Alagappa College of Technology	Guindy	Chennai district	1944	University department
3	School of Architecture and Planning	Guindy	Chennai district	1957	University department
4	Madras Institute of Technology	Chromepet	Chengalpattu	1949	University department

Anna University - Tharamani, Chennai Circle:

No.	Regional office/campus or college name	Location	District	Affiliation	Estd.	Status
1	Anna University Tharamani Campus	Tharamani	Chennai district	Anna University	2008	Anna University campus
2	Anna University College of Engineering Villupuram	Villupuram	Villupuram	Anna University	01-09-2008	Anna University-affiliated Anna University college
3	Anna University College of Engineering Tindivanam	Tindivanam	Villupuram	Anna University	2008	Anna University-affiliated Anna University college
4	Anna University College of Engineering Arani	Arani	Tiruvannamalai	Anna University	2007	Anna University-affiliated Anna University college
5	Anna University College of Engineering Kanchipuram	Kanchipuram	Kanchipuram	Anna University	2010	Anna University-affiliated Anna University college

Anna University - Tiruchirappalli Circle:

No.	Regional office/campus or college name	Location	District	Affiliation	Estd.	Status
1	Anna University Tiruchirappalli Campus	Tiruchirappalli	Tiruchirappalli district	Anna University	2007	Anna University zonal campus (or) office
2	Anna University Panruti Campus	Panruti	Cuddalore district	Anna University	2007	Anna University-affiliated Anna University college (or) campus
3	Anna University Pattukkottai Campus	Rajamadam, Pattukkottai Taluk	Thanjavur	Anna University	15 September 2009	Anna University-affiliated Anna University college (or) campus
4	Anna University Thirukkuvalai Campus	Thirukkuvalai	Nagapattinam	Anna University	2007	Anna University-affiliated Anna University college (or) campus
5	Anna University Ariyalur Campus	Ariyalur	Ariyalur	Anna University	2007	Anna University-affiliated Anna University college (or) campus

Anna University - Madurai Circle:

No.	Regional office/campus or college name	Location	District	Affiliation	Estd.	Status
1	Anna University Madurai Campus	Madurai	Madurai district	Anna University	2010	Anna University zonal campus (or) office
2	Anna University Ramanathapuram Campus	Ramanathapuram	Ramanathapuram	Anna University	2007	Anna University-affiliated Anna University college (or) campus
3	Anna University Dindigul Campus	Dindigul	Dindigul	Anna University	2007	Anna University-affiliated Anna University college (or) campus

Anna University - Tirunelveli Circle:

No.	Regional office/campus or college name	Location	District	Affiliation	Estd.	Status
1	Anna University Tirunelveli Campus	Tirunelveli	Tirunelveli district	Anna University	2007	Anna University zonal campus (or) office
2	Anna University College of Engineering Nagercoil	Nagercoil	Nagercoil	Anna University	2007	Anna University-affiliated Anna University college
3	Anna University V.O.Chidambaranar College of Engineering	Thoothukudi	Thoothukudi	Anna University	2007	Anna University-affiliated Anna University college

Anna University - Coimbatore Circle:

No.	Regional office/campus or college name	Location	District	Affiliation	Estd.	Status
1	Anna University Coimbatore Campus	Coimbatore	Coimbatore district	Anna University	2007	Anna University zonal campus (or) office

=== Tamil Nadu Government's engineering and technology colleges ===
The engineering and technology colleges operated by the Tamil Nadu government are listed at List of Tamil Nadu Government's Engineering Colleges.

== Law colleges ==
Tamil Nadu Dr. Ambedkar Law University is a public state university operated by the Tamil Nadu government that has seven constituent colleges within Tamil Nadu.

== Veterinary and animal sciences colleges ==
=== Tamil Nadu Veterinary and Animal Sciences University's colleges ===
The colleges associated with the Tamil Nadu Veterinary and Animal Sciences University are listed in the article on the university.

== Fisheries colleges ==
The constituent colleges of Tamil Nadu Fisheries University are listed in the university's article.

== Medical colleges ==
The medical colleges operated by the Tamil Nadu government are listed at List of Tamil Nadu Government's Medical Colleges.

== Agricultural Colleges and Research Institutes ==
The Agricultural Colleges and Research Institutes of Tamil Nadu Agricultural University are situated in 19 places across Tamil Nadu which are funded directly by The Tamil Nadu Agricultural University, an autonomous body under the Government of Tamil Nadu.

== Teachers Education colleges ==
All colleges under the Tamil Nadu Teachers Education University.

- Government College of Education, Komarapalayam, Namakkal
- Government College of Education for Women, Coimbatore
- Government College of Education, Vellore
- Institute of Advanced Study in Education
- Lady Willingdon Institute of Advanced Study in Education, Chennai
- Stella Matutina College of Education
- The Government College of education, Pudukkottai

== Polytechnic colleges ==
=== Tamil Nadu Government's polytechnic colleges ===
- Bharathiar Centenary Memorial Government Women's Polytechnic College, Ettayapuram, BCMW Ettayapuram, 04632-271238
- Central Polytechnic College, Chennai, CPT Chennai, 044-22541929
- Government Polytechnic, Boomandahalli, Dharmapuri, GPT Dharmapuri, 04348293066
- Government Polytechnic, Thiruthuraipoondi, Tiruvarur, GPT Tiruvarur, 04369 224435
- Government Polytechnic College, Aranthangi, Pudukkottai, GPT Aranthangi, Pudukkottai, 04371-224569
- Government Polytechnic College (women's), Chennai, WPT Chennai
- Dr. Dharmambal Government Polytechnic College for Women, Chennai, www.drdgpcw.org
- Government Polytechnic College, Coimbatore, GPT Coimbatore, 04222573218
- Government Polytechnic College, Theni, GPT Theni, 04546291904
- Government Polytechnic College (women's), Coimbatore, WPT coimbatore, 04222240917
- Government Polytechnic Karaikal, GPT Karaikal, Ariyalur 04368263128,04368263129
- Government polytechnic college, Mohanur (GPT MOHANUR), NAMAKKAL (DT), 04286255211
- Government Polytechnic College, Karur, GPT Karur, 04323255322
- Government Polytechnic College, Krishnagiri, GPT Krishnagiri, 04343233867
- Government Polytechnic College, Madurai, GPT Madurai, 0452941141,04522941142
- Government Polytechnic College, Perundurai, GPT Erode
- Government Polytechnic College, Nagercoil, GPT Nagercoil
- Government Polytechnic College, Perambalur, GPT Perambalur, 04328201020
- Government Polytechnic College, Gandharvakottai, 0432227529
- Government Polytechnic College, Thoothukkudi, GPT Thoothukkudi, 04612311647
- Government Polytechnic College, Tiruvannamalai, GPT Tiruvannamalai, 044-22350525
- Government Polytechnic College, Trichy, GPT Trichy, 04-2552226, 0431-2550922
- Government Polytechnic College, Udhagamandalam (Ooty), The Nilgiris, GPT Udhagamandalam, The Nilgiris, 04232443407
- Thanthai Periyar E V Ramaswamy Government Polytechnic college, Vellore, 0416-2266266,2264265

== Industrial training institutes ==
The industrial training institutes operated by the Tamil Nadu government are listed at List of Tamil Nadu Government Industrial Training Institutes.

== Public institutions ==
No.	College name	Location	District	Estd.
1	Institute of Road Transport	Taramani	Chennai	1976
2	Institute of Ceramic Technology	Vridhachalam	Cuddalore	1972
3	Government Production Centre for Scientific Glass Apparatus	Coimbatore	Coimbatore	1976
4	Government Scientific Glass Training Centre	Guindy	Chennai	1972
5	Government Technical Training Centre	Guindy	Chennai	1976
6	Institute of Tool Engineering	Dindigul	Dindigul	1976
7	State Institute of Rural Development	Maraimalai Nagar	Chengalpattu	1961
8	Institute of Child Health and Hospital for Children	Egmore	Chennai	1957
9	Institute of Chemical Technology	Taramani	Chennai	1963
10	Institute of Textile Technology	Taramani	Chennai	1957
11	Institute of Printing Technology	Taramani	Chennai	1926
12	Institute of Leather Technology	Taramani	Chennai	1915
13	Tamil Nadu State Judicial Academy	R. A. Puram	Chennai	2001
14	Institute of Mathematical Sciences	Guindy	Chennai	1962
15	Institute of Mental Health	Kilpauk	Chennai	1794
16	Institute of Water Studies	Taramani	Chennai	1974
17	International Institute of Tamil Studies	Taramani	Chennai	1970
18	Tamil Nadu State Urdu Academy	Santhome	Chennai	2000
19	Tamil Nadu Institute of Urban Studies	Sai Baba colony	Coimbatore	1981

== See also ==
- Government of Tamil Nadu
- List of Tamil Nadu Government's Engineering Colleges
- List of Tamil Nadu Government's Law Colleges
- List of Tamil Nadu Government's Medical Colleges
- List of Tamil Nadu Government Industrial Training Institutes
- List of Tamil Nadu Government Arts and Science Colleges
- List of Tamil Nadu governmental organisations
