= Anna University of Technology =

Anna University of Technology may refer to:

- Anna University of Technology, Chennai
- Anna University of Technology, Coimbatore
- Anna University of Technology, Madurai
- Anna University of Technology, Tiruchirappalli
- Anna University of Technology Tirunelveli
