= Sree Saraswathi Thyagaraja College =

Educational institution in Tamil Nadu, India

Sree Saraswathi Thyagaraja College is an educational institution in Tamil Nadu, India, established in 1997. Situated between Udumalpet and Pollachi, the college offers seven undergraduate and eight postgraduate courses.

It is a co-educational and self-financing institution, affiliated to the Bharathiar University and approved by the AICTE and UGC New Delhi. It has been accredited with ISO 9001:2000 certification.

== History ==
In 2008 the college set up a Centre for Counselling and Guidance headed by Dr. Thomas Janetius, a professional counselor and psychotherapist from De La Salle University-Manila, Philippines, to provide care and support for students and faculty in their personal/social, academic, and career development.

Sree Saraswathi Thyagaraja College was placed as second best college for overall performance in 2009 among all the affiliated colleges of Bharathiar University. The Tamil Nadu State Information Commissioner gave the award at a function organised at Bharathiar University.

The college offers a psycho-spiritual development program for Coimbatore Central Prison inmates. This year-round program will focus on giving meaning and purpose, and reform, for future life. The program is conducted by Dr. Janetius, director, Centre for Counselling and Guidance of the college.

STC organized a two-day national level seminar on "Human Rights Abuse on Elders" on 8–9 July 2010. It was coordinated by the STC Centre for Counselling and Guidance, and the PG Department of Social Work. The vice-chancellor of Bharathiar University inaugurated the sessions and the DIG of Prisons P. Govindarajan distributed certificates to the researchers. 33 papers were presented in the six technical sessions.

=== New courses ===
STC started new degree courses in 2020: MSc Applied psychology and MSc Psychology, Bsc Data analytics and BSC Artificial intelligence and machine learning.

== Trust ==
The college was founded by the V.S.V. Vidyaa Mandir Charitable Trust, which was formed by three business and philanthropic families: P.M. Thiagarajan, Smt. T. Saraswathi, M.K. Arumugam, Smt. A. Mahalakshmi and D. Sivaraman, Smt. Vasantham Sivam.Founder Chairman Rtn.S.Venkkatesh and other trustees have taken the Institution from 35 students in 1997 to about strength of 3000 students. The trust's aim is to uplift the members of society through education.
