= U. Chandrasekhar =

Dr. Udayagiri Chandrasekhar, FIE (born 10 May 1963) is an Indian researcher and educator. India, the oldest and largest organization of professional engineers in India in October 2014, and heads the Engineering Staff College of India (ESCI), and Organ of The Institution of Engineers (India).

He is currently the Program Director -AddWize at Wipro 3D, Bangalore, Karnataka

He is a Fellow of The Institution of Engineers (India). He has been inducted as a Member of the Academic Committee of the National Board of Accreditation (NBA), an apex body of the Ministry of Human Resources Development (MHRD) of the Government of India, promoting international quality standards for technical education in India. He is also on the R&D vision team of the Visvesvaraya Technological University and Anna University, a role through which he is catalyzing R&D culture among engineering colleges.
