= S. R. Ramanan =

Indian meteorologist

S R Ramanan is an Indian meteorologist. He worked as the Director of Cyclone warning centre in Chennai, Indian state of Tamil Nadu. He serves on the advisory committee of the centre for climate change and adoption research, Anna University, Chennai. He became popular in social media. Ramanan retired in July 2016 after 36 years as a weatherman.

== Education ==
Ramanan is a post graduate in physics from Annamalai University. He got his PhD from the Madras University in the field of Agricultural Climatology. Ramanan is a HSC from Aruna Higher secondary school, Eraiyur Village.

== Career ==
He joined the Meteorological Department of India in 1980. He worked as a forecaster in the Northern Hemisphere Analysis centre in New Delhi and at Aviation Meteorological Office of Chennai Airport. He was actively involved during the installation of Automatic Message Switching System in 1995 and was promoted to Director in the 2002. He joined the Area Cyclone Warning Centre at the Regional Meteorological centre at Chennai. He is a recipient of the "For the sake of Honour Award" from Rotary International in 2006. He represented India in 1998 in Japan regarding preparation of inventory for greenhouse gases. He represented the country regarding Synergised Standard Operating Procedures for coastal hazards in Bangkok during May 2013.

== Retirement ==
Ramanan retired from Regional Meteorological centre on 31 March 2016.

== Sources ==
- NIQR
