= Indian Institute of Information Technology, Tiruchirappalli =

Institute in Tiruchirappalli Tamil Nadu

Coordinates: 10.6697°N 78.5936°E

Indian Institute of Information Technology Tiruchirappalli
- Campus: Sethurapatti, Trichy-Madurai Highway, Trichy 620012
- Type: Public-Private Partnership
- Established: 2013; 13 years ago
- Director: Narasimha Sarma N. V. S.
- Associate Dean: R. Dhanalakshmi
- Location: Tiruchirappalli, Tamil Nadu, India
- Website: www.iiitt.ac.in

Indian Institute of Information Technology Tiruchirappalli (IIIT-T) is a higher education academic and research institute located in Tiruchirappalli, Tamil Nadu, India. It is one of the Indian Institutes of Information Technology (IIITs) established under the non-profit Public-Private Partnership and is funded by the Government of India, Government of Tamil Nadu and the Indian industry partners in the ratio of 50:35:15. Industry partners include Tata Consultancy Services (TCS), Cognizant Technology Solutions (CTS), Infosys, Ramco Systems, ELCOT, and Navitas (Take Solutions). Together with the other IIITs, it has been granted the status of Institute of National importance in 2017.

== Campus ==
=== Temporary campus ===
IIIT Tiruchirappalli started functioning in 2013 in the premises of Bharathidasan Institute of Technology (BIT) Campus but it was shifted to National Institute of Technology, Tiruchirappalli (NITT) in 2016. The NITT resources such as Boys and Girls Hostels, Messes, Central Library, Sports Facilities, Swimming Pool, Hospital, Bank, Post Office, Canteen, Class rooms, Laboratories and Central Computing facilities are being shared with IIITT. Until June 2019, under the support of mentor director Dr. Mini Shaji Thomas, IIITT has been functioning at its peak by collaborating with NITT in terms of facilities being provided and participation in technical and cultural events hosted by NITT. In September 2019, IIITT shifted the hostel and sports amenities to K. Ramakrishna College of Engineering. On July 1, 2020, IIITT shifted its temporary campus to Oxford Engineering College (Dindugal - Pirattiyur highway). As of July 2021 IIITT is functioning completely from the permanent campus of IIIT Tiruchirappalli, Sethurapatti. IIITT has its own placement cell since 2017 and has been assisting students in obtaining placement offers from companies like TCS, Infosys, Modelon and few startups.

=== Permanent campus ===
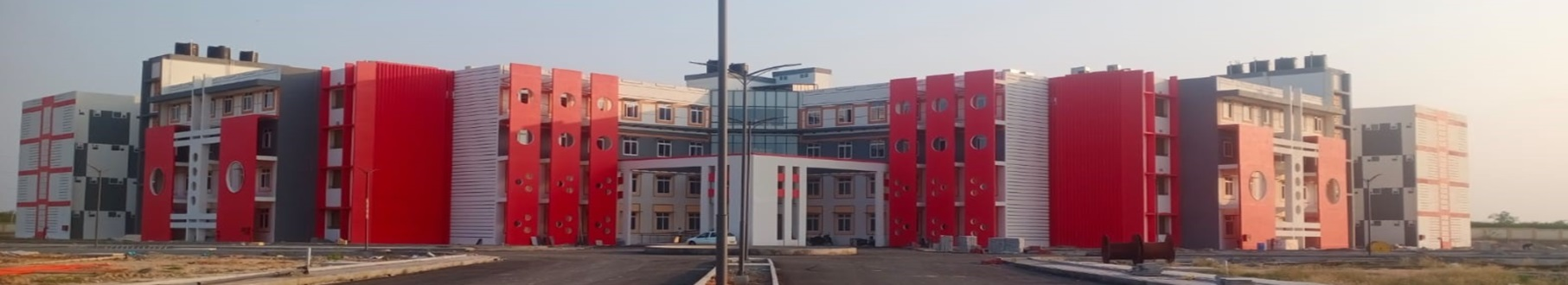
IIIT-Campus

The permanent campus of IIITT is established approximately in 62 acres of land identified in Sethurappatti, Srirangam Taluk, Tiruchirappalli which is 15 km away from Tiruchirappalli Junction and 10 km from Viralimalai Town, Pudukkottai District along the highway of Tiruchirappalli to Madurai. The campus is fully functioning through its permanent campus.

== Academics ==
=== Academic programs ===
==== Undergraduate Courses ====
1. Computer Science and Engineering (4 year, Bachelor of Technology)
2. Electronics and Communication Engineering

==== Postgraduate Courses ====
1. Computer Science and Engineering (2 years, Masters of Technology)
2. VLSI Systems (2 years, Masters of Technology)

==== Computer Science and Engineering ====
Data Analytics, Machine Learning, Deep Learning, IoT, Cloud Computing, Medical Image Processing and allied areas

==== Electronics and Communication Engineering ====
VLSI Design, Wireless Communication, Micro & Nano Electronics, Compact Modeling & Simulation and allied areas

==== Mechanical Engineering ====
Additive Manufacturing, Powder Metallurgy, Smart Materials, Energy storage materials

==== Science and Humanities ====
===== Physics =====
Optoelectronic Materials & Devices, Fiber optics, Plasmonics, Semiconductor heterostructures

===== Mathematics =====
Fluid Dynamics

===== Economics =====
Health Economics, Health Technology Assessment, Global issues in health and development

===== English =====
Applied Linguistics, Indian Writing in English

=== Admission ===
The admission to B.Tech programs is done through JEE-Mains and the JEE-Mains qualified candidates are admitted to UG program through Centralized Seat Allocation Board (CSAB) and Joint Seat Allocation Authority (JoSAA) following the reservation policy of Govt. of India.

== Student life ==
=== Clubs and Associations ===
Feliz CLUB

The club is a student club of volunteers formed to identify the needs of socially weaker sections such as old age homes, orphanages, etc. and to extend a helping hand to their requirements. The Feliz club was formally inaugurated on 07, April 2017.

=== Annual events ===
Atrang

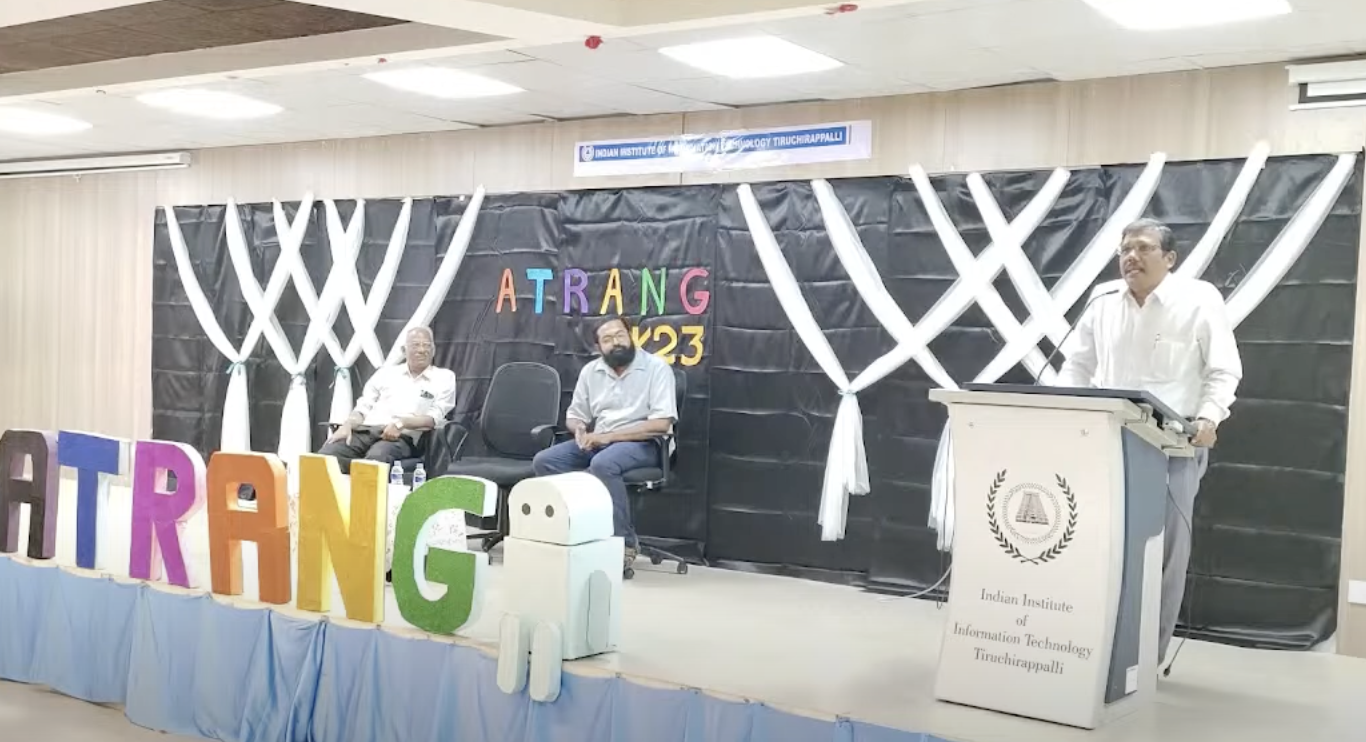
Atrang 23 Inauguration

Atrang is the annual techinal festival of IIIT Tiruchirappalli.

==== Aahladh ====
Aahladh is an annual cultural festival at IIIT Tiruchirappalli.

==== Institute Day ====
The Institute Day is celebrated on 07, April. On this day Meritorious students are awarded Certificates and Medals. Various cultural activities were performed by the students which include Indian Classical Dance, Solo Dance, Mono Act, Group Dance.

== See also ==
- National Institute of Technology, Tiruchirappalli
- List of universities in India
- Universities and colleges in India
- Education in India
