= Government College of Engineering, Bargur =

Engineering college in Bargur, Krishnagiri, India

- Other names: GCE, Bargur
- Type: Autonomous
- Established: 1994
- Academic affiliations: Anna University
- Principal: Dr. Nafessa Begum
- Location: Krishnagiri, Tamil Nadu, India
- Campus: 50 acres (200,000 m^{2})
- Website: www.gcebargur.ac.in

The Government College of Engineering, Bargur is an engineering college in the Krishnagiri district of Tamil Nadu, India. A Centre of Excellence in Robotics was inaugurated at the college in March 2026.

== History ==
The Government College of Engineering was started in Dharmapuri district in 1994. It started functioning in two of the buildings in Government Polytechnic campus, Krishnagiri. The college is affiliated to Anna University. 50 acres (200,000 m^{2}) of land in Madepalli village on NH46, 4 km (2.5 mi) west from Bargur was acquired for the college in 2004. A sum of RS.7.85 crores has been spent on the construction of an Administrative Block, Electronics and Communication Engineering Block, Electrical and Electrical Engineering Block, Computer Science Engineering Block, Mechanical Engineering Block, Library Block and Hostels for male and female students.

The college is one of top among ten government engineering colleges in the state of Tamil Nadu coexisting with nearly 500 plus private engineering colleges.

In 2019, the college was selected under Phase – III of Technical Education Quality Implementation Programme (TEQIP), an initiative by Ministry of Human Resource Department and a fund of ₹ 7 crore was sanctioned. The project was supported by World Bank.

== Location ==
It was started on 9 September 1994 and housed temporarily in two buildings of the Government Polytechnic, Krishnagiri. It was later shifted in July 2000 to its own 50-acre (200,000 m^{2}) campus in Bargur, located at latitude = 12.548°, longitude =78.334° on a site surrounded by hills on the National Highway 46 (NH46) about 10 km (6.2 mi) east from Krishnagiri and between Vaniyambadi and Krishnagiri.

== Affiliation ==
The college was originally affiliated to the University of Madras. From 1998 to 1999, it was affiliated to the newly started Periyar University. In 2002-03 it became a constituent college of Anna University which is a statewide centralized engineering university. In January 2007 a bill was introduced to the Tamil Nadu State Assembly to retake the administration of the college while retaining its affiliation to Anna University.

== Courses ==
The first batch of undergraduate students passed out in the academic year 1998–99 in Electrical and Electronics Engineering and Electronics and Communication Engineering. Later Computer Science and Mechanical Engineering branches were introduced. Post-graduate courses in Applied Electronics, Power Electronics and Computer Science and Engineering are also offered.

In January 2022, the college was chosen along with nine others, for foreign language course.

== Departments ==
- Department of Electrical and Electronics Engineering
- Department of Electronics and Communication Engineering
- Department of Computer Science and Engineering
- Department of Mechanical Engineering
- Department of Mathematics
- Department of Physics
- Department of Chemistry
- Department of English

== Admission ==
Admission is based on performance in the State higher secondary school examinations. Cutoff is calculated from the marks obtained in maths, physics and chemistry. Candidates are admitted by online counseling TNEA conducted by Department of Technical Education.Post Graduation admissions are based on ceeta-pg entrance exam conducted by anna Anna university .

== See also ==
- List of Tamil Nadu Government's Educational Institutions
- List of Tamil Nadu Government's Engineering Colleges
