= T Parimelazhagan =

Indian botanist (born 1973)

T. Parimelazhagan
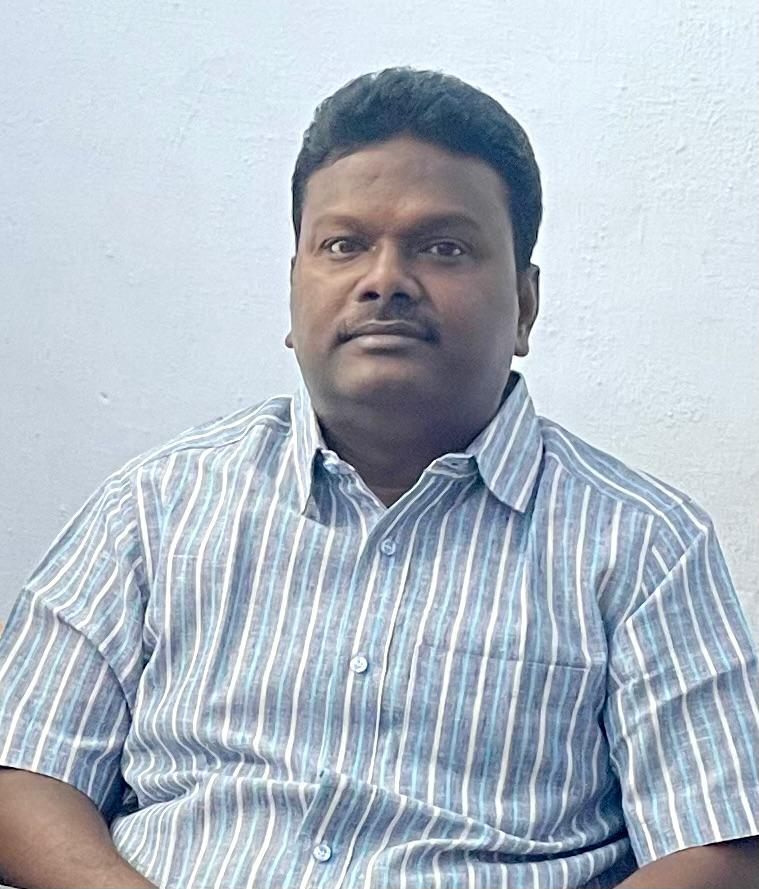
- Born: 16 June 1973 (age 53); Ariyalur, Tamil Nadu, India
- Scientific career
- Fields: Plant Physiology, Phytomedicine, Pharmacology, Bioprospecting of medicinal plants
- Workplaces: Bharathiar University, Coimbatore, Tamil Nadu
- Website: b-u.ac.in

T. Parimelazhagan (Dr Parimelazhagan Thangaraj) is a professor and head of the Department of Botany, Bharathiar University, Tamil Nadu. He is known for his expertise in phytomedicine and bioprospecting of medicinal plants. His research involves analysing and isolating various phytocompounds and evaluating the valuable properties of traditional medicinal plants.

== Career ==
Parimelazhagan completed his graduation (1990–1993) from St. Joseph's College (Autonomous), Trichy and PhD from Bharathiar University under the guidance of plant physiologist Prof. K. Francis. He then joined as a scientist at Defence Research & Development Organization, Ministry of Defence, Ladakh. He has also worked as a Scientist at Rubber Research Institute of India, Ministry of Commerce, Meghalaya. In 2008, he joined Bharathiar University as a Reader to fulfilling his dream of becoming a teacher. He was awarded the prestigious Raman Fellowship for Post-Doctoral Research in 2014 for Indian scholars in the Dept. of Pharmaceutical Sciences, College of Pharmacy University of Hawaii by University Grand Commission, Govt. of India. He has also written several books and book chapters in his field of specialisation. His research outcomes were converted into patents, and three patents were granted to him. He has more than 110 research publications in international and national peer-reviewed journals.

== Awards and recognition ==
- Fellow of the Royal Society of Biology, London, U.K.
- Fellow of the Linnean Society (2021), London
- National Science Day Medal 2005 by DRDO, India
- Laboratory Scientist of the Year award 2005 by DRDO, India
- Raman Post Doctoral Fellowship by University Grand Commission, Govt. of India
- Mid - Career Award, University Grants Commission, New Delhi

== Books coauthored/edited ==
- S.K. Dwivedi & T. Parimelazhagan (Eds). 2009. Seabuckthorn Hippophae spp.: The Golden Bush. Satish Serial Publishing House, New Delhi
- T. Parimelazhagan, S.Manian & M.Pugalenthi (Eds). 2011. Herbal perspectives: Present and Future. Satish Serial Publishing House, New Delhi.
- T. Parimelazhagan. 2012. Herbal drug research: Recent Trends and Progress: A research close to nature. LAP LAMBERT Academic Publishing, Germany.
- T. Parimelazhagan (Ed.). 2013. Traditional Herbal Medicine. Pointer Publishers, Jaipur, India.
- T. Parimelazhagan. 2013. Turning Plants into Medicines – Novel Approach. New India Publishing Agency, New Delhi, India
- T. Parimelazhagan. 2013. Scientific Basis of Herbal Medicine. Astral International (P) Ltd, New Delhi, India
- T. Parimelazhagan. 2015. Modern Methods in Phytomedicine. Astral International (P) Ltd, New Delhi. India
- T. Parimelazhagan. 2016. Pharmacological Assays of Plant - Based Natural Products. Springer International Publishing, Switzerland.
- T. Parimelazhagan. 2018. Medicinal Plants: Promising Future for Health and New Drugs. CRC Press, Taylor & Francis Group, Broken Sound Parkway, NW.
- T. Parimelazhagan. 2020. Phytomedicine: Research and Development. CRC Press, Taylor & Francis Group.
- T. Parimelazhagan, L.J.Q. Junior & N. Ponpandian. 2022. Nanophytomedicine: An Emerging Platform for Drug Delivery. CRC Press.
