= Mallayan Palaniandvar =

Indian bioinorganic chemist (born 1951)

Mallayan Palaniandavar
- Born: 5 June 1951 (age 75)
- Education: Madurai Kamaraj University, Madurai
- Known for: Metal–DNA interactions; biomimetic models of metalloenzymes
- Awards: Fellow of the Indian National Science Academy (INSA); Fellow of the Indian Academy of Sciences (FASc); Fellow of the Royal Society of Chemistry (FRSC)
- Scientific career
- Fields: Bioinorganic chemistry
- Workplaces: Bharathidasan University

Mallayan Palaniandavar (born 5 June 1951) is an Indian chemist specializing in bioinorganic chemistry who has worked on metal–DNA interactions and biomimetic models of metalloenzymes. He is a Fellow of the Indian National Science Academy (INSA), the Indian Academy of Sciences (FASc), and the Royal Society of Chemistry (FRSC).

He served as a professor at Bharathidasan University, Tiruchirappalli, India, and continues his research as Professor of Eminence and INSA Senior Scientist.

== Early life and education ==
Palaniandavar completed his undergraduate and postgraduate studies at Madurai Kamaraj University, earning his B.Sc. (1971), M.Sc. (1973), and Ph.D. (1981) in chemistry.

== Career and research ==
Palaniandavar's research focuses on bioinorganic chemistry, particularly metal–DNA interactions, biomimetic models of copper and iron enzymes, and bioinspired oxidation catalysis. His studies on mixed-ligand copper(II) and ruthenium(II) complexes have contributed to understanding DNA binding, cleavage, and protein interactions of transition-metal complexes. He has also developed functional models for non-heme iron enzymes relevant to catechol dioxygenases and related metalloenzymes.

== Honours ==
He is a Fellow of the Indian National Science Academy (INSA), the Indian Academy of Sciences (FASc), and the Royal Society of Chemistry (FRSC).
