= Anna Stadium =

Stadium in Tiruchirappalli, India

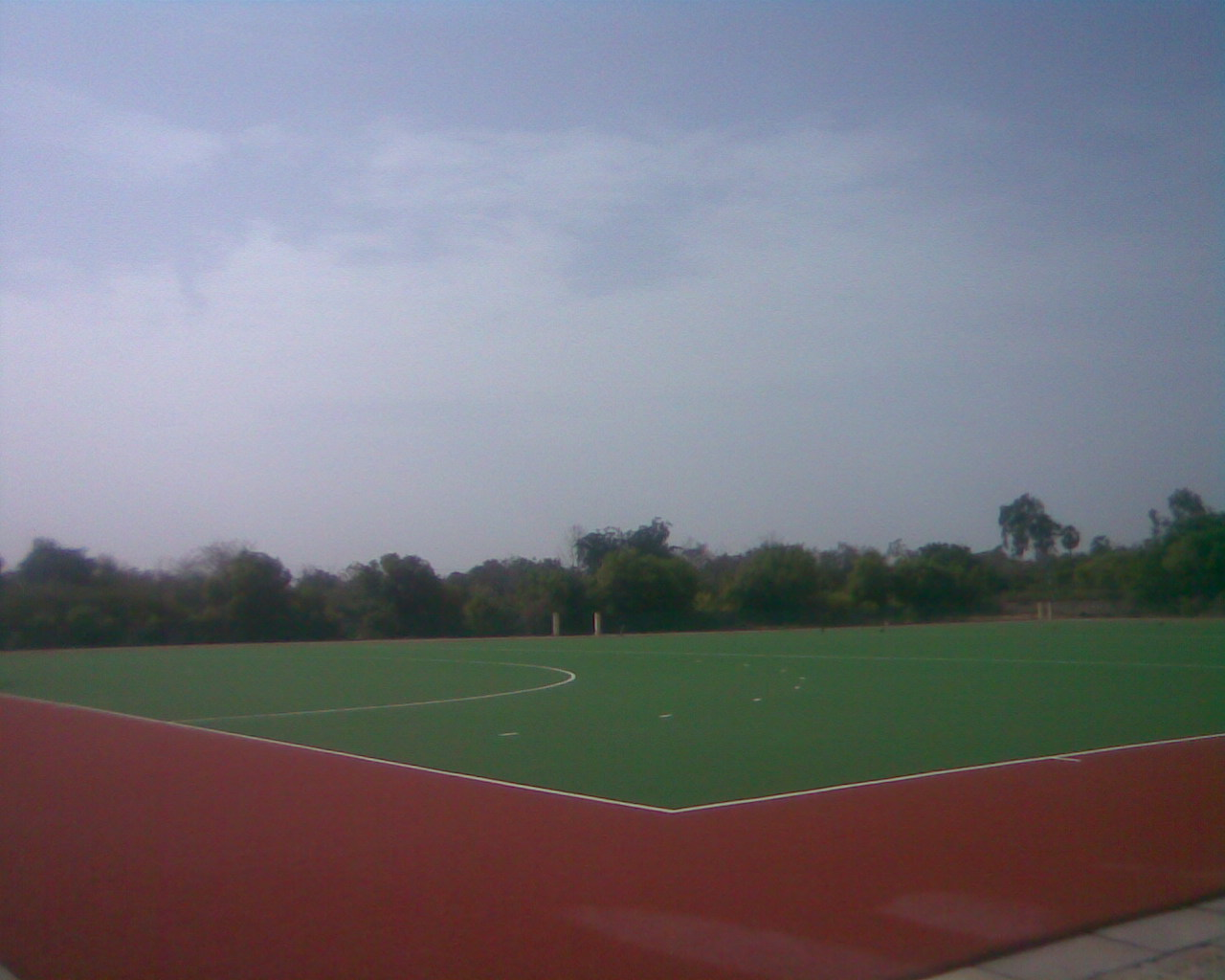
- Hockey Turf Anna Stadium
- Interactive map of Anna Stadium
- Full name: Anna Stadium
- Location: Khajamalai, Tiruchirappalli, Tamil Nadu
- Coordinates: 10°46′50.0″N 78°41′47.7″E
- Owner: Sports Development Authority of Tamil Nadu, Government of Tamil Nadu
- Capacity: 10,000
- Surface: Grass

Construction
- Built: 1970
- Renovated: 2009
- Expanded: 2015
- Cost: ₹3 crore (US$310,000); ₹12 crore (US$1.2 million) (2015 expansion)

The Anna Stadium is a multi-purpose stadium in the Anna Sports Complex located in the Indian city of Tiruchirappalli, Tamil Nadu. It is mainly used for football matches and athletic events. It has a capacity of 10,000. It also has an eight-lane 400 metres (1,300 ft) synthetic athletic track.

== History ==
The stadium was built by the Sports Development Authority of Tamil Nadu in 1970 at a cost of ₹3 crore (equivalent to ₹161 crore or US$17 million in 2026) funded by the state government. The synthetic turf imported from Netherlands, was laid in two weeks by a professional from England. In 2011, construction of a new multi-purpose stadium at a cost of ₹1.77 crore (US$180,000) was started. A new eight-lane synthetic athletic track were also installed. The total cost of the expansion was ₹12 crore (US$1.2 million). With this, Trichy became the fourth city in Tamil Nadu after Chennai, Coimbatore, and Madurai to have such facility for athletics.

== See also ==
- Kalyani Stadium
- Mangala Stadium
