= Anna University Chennai – Regional Office, Tiruchirappalli =

University in Tiruchirappalli, India

Anna University, Tiruchirappalli
- Other names: AUT-T, BIT Campus
- Motto: Progress through Knowledge
- Type: Public
- Established: 1999
- Affiliations: UGC
- Chancellor: Governor of Tamilnadu
- Dean: T. Senthilkumar
- Location: Tiruchirappalli, Tamil Nadu, India; 10°39′26″N 78°44′46″E
- Campus: Tiruchirappalli, 354 acres (143 ha)
- Website: www.aubit.edu.in

University College of Engineering (BIT Campus), Anna University Tiruchirappalli otherwise Anna University Chennai – Regional Office, Tiruchirappalli (AUC-ROT), erstwhile Anna University of Technology, Tiruchirappalli, is a technical university department of Anna University, It is located on Tiruchirappalli–Pudukkottai National Highway 336, Tamil Nadu, India. It was established on 1999 as a part of Bharathidasan University with five departments viz., Bio-Technology, Petrochemical Technology, Information Technology and Pharmaceutical Technology. In 2007, due to management constrains Anna University was split into six universities, namely: Anna University, Chennai; Anna University, Chennai – Taramani Campus; Anna University Chennai - Regional Office, Coimbatore; Anna University Chennai - Regional Office, Madurai; Anna University Chennai – Regional Office, Tiruchirappalli; Anna University Chennai - Regional Office, Tirunelveli. Government acquired this campus from Bharathidasan University and renamed it as Anna University Tiruchirappalli in 2007.The university is an accredited university with powers to grant affiliations to colleges and universities conducting graduate and post graduate studies, as well as diploma courses, and is so recognized by the UGC.

Anna University Tiruchirappalli offers higher education in Engineering, Technology, Management and allied sciences at undergraduate, postgraduate and doctorate level. It also offers Post Graduate Courses to teaching faculties of other colleges to enrich their academic career through Modular Based Credit Banking System (MBCBS).The AUTianz, is the official students' e-Magazine of Anna University of Technology, Tiruchirappalli.

== History ==
Anna University Chennai – Regional Office, Tiruchirappalli was formerly known as Anna University of Technology, Tiruchirappalli which is previously known as the School of Engineering and Technology of the Bharathidasan University, and later the Bharathidasan Institute of Technology (BIT). In December 2007, it was converted into an affiliating university, with almost all engineering colleges in the south district under its fold and absorbed all the government engineering colleges in Tamil Nadu as its constituent colleges. This includes five constituent engineering colleges, 64 Self-Financing Colleges, 10 MBA colleges, three MCA colleges and three colleges offering architecture.

On 14 September 2011 a bill was passed to merge back the universities. However, as of February 2012, the separate universities are still operating.

=== Timeline of University name ===
- 1999–2007 – School of Engineering and Technology, Bharathidasan Institute of Technology (part of Bharathidasan University).
- 2007–2010 – Anna University Tiruchirappalli.
- 2010–2012 – Anna University of Technology Tiruchirappalli (Main Campus).
- 2012–2013 – Bharathidasan Institute of Technology, Tiruchirappalli.
- 2013 to present – Anna University Chennai- Regional Office Tiruchirappalli (BIT Campus).
- 2013 to present - University College of Engineering, (BIT Campus), Anna University, Tiruchirappalli

The name of the university is changing throughout time due to various administration power transfers. But since the beginning, it has retained the name BIT campus among students. During its inception as Anna University, its constituent colleges/campuses are opened in various parts of Tamil Nadu viz., Pattukottai campus, Thirukkuvazhai campus, Ariyalur campus, Dindugal campus, Thoothukudi campus, Ramanathapuram campus, Nagercoil campus and Panruti campus under its control. Subsequently, those campuses were renamed and given to other universities.

== Campus ==
The main campus is situated in the southern part of Tiruchirappalli and extends over 354 acres (1.43 km^{2}) adjoining the Mandaiyur and the Palkalaiperur. The campus houses ten departments, six hostels (3 each for boys and girls), two cottages(using by hostel students one each for boys and girls), a gymnasium (indoor stadium), a government health centre, three banks, Animal Centre(under Pharmaceutical department), canteen, student co-operative store, guest houses for vice-chancellor and VIPs and parking facilities on all buildings. The campus has vast area available for development. It was one of the first University campuses in the world to provide Mechanical and Civil engineering completely in Tamil Medium. Separate editions of various engineering books are exclusively written and translated into Tamil by faculties of this university.

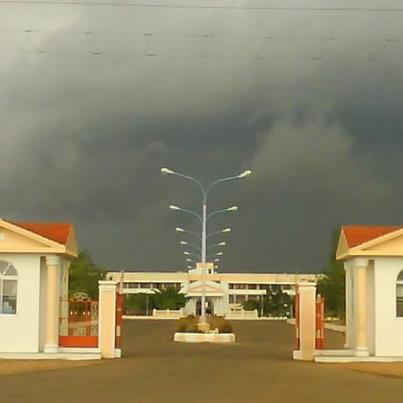
Main entrance of AUT

== Departments ==
=== Engineering ===
- Automobile Engineering
- Civil Engineering
- Civil Engineering (Tamil Medium)
- Civil Engineering (Environmental Engineering)
- Computer Science and Engineering
- Computer Science and Engineering (Data Science)
- Computer Science and Engineering (AI And Machine Learning)
- Electrical and Electronics Engineering
- Electrical and Computer Engineering
- Electronics and Communication Engineering
- Electronics Engineering (VLSI Design and Technology)
- Mechanical Engineering
- Mechanical Engineering (Tamil Medium)
- Mechanical Engineering (Automobile)
- Mechanical and Smart Manufacturing

=== Technology ===
- Biotechnology
- Information Technology
- Petrochemical Technology
- Pharmaceutical Technology

=== Humanities ===
- English
- Mathematics
- Physics,
- Chemistry

=== Others ===
- Management Studies
- Computer Applications

== Programmes Offered ==
| Under Graduate | Post Graduate |
|---|---|
| Automobile Engineering | Environmental Engineering |
| Bio-Technology | Structural Engineering |
| Civil Engineering | Computer Science Engineering |
| Civil Engineering(Tamil medium) | Software Engineering |
| Computer Science Engineering | Mobile and Pervasive Computing |
| Electronics and Communication Engineering | Thermal Engineering |
| Electrical and Electronics Engineering | Manufacturing technology |
| Information Technology | Energy Engineering |
| Mechanical Engineering | Nano Science and Technology |
| Mechanical Engineering (Tamil Medium) | Communication Engineering |
| Petrochemical Technology | Power Systems |
| Pharmaceutical Technology | Bio-Technology |
| | Energy Conservation and Management |
| | Bio-Pharmaceutical Technology |

In addition to this the university offers MCA, MBA, M.Pharm. in Pharmaceutics, M.Pharm. in Pharmaceutical analysis and Ph.D/MS(by Research) programs in all disciplines. It also conducts National and International conferences/symposium regularly. The departments of this university receives funds from various nodal agencies such as CSIR, DST, DRDO, UGC, TNSCST, ICMR, MNRE for research activities.
