= Bharathidasan Institute of Technology =

Coordinates: 10.6787°N 78.732536°E

Bharathidasan Institute of Technology (or BIT) (formerly the School of Engineering and Technology) was established by Bharathidasan University in 1999. BIT was located in the downtown Khajamalai Campus and was moved to the South Campus (Technology Campus) in 2001. In addition to the academic blocks, the campus houses the Indoor Sports Complex and residential complex. Bharathidasan University operates shuttle services to the adjacent Main Campus.

The school started with four branches of technology: Biotechnology, Information Technology, Petrochemical Technology and Pharmaceutical Engineering & Technology. A B.Tech. level course in Automobile Technology was introduced in 2004 apart from postgraduate programmes of M.Tech. in Software Engineering and M.Pharm. in Pharmaceutics, in 2005. An M.Tech. programme in Energy Conservation and Management is offered. The school was made autonomous from 2005.

Being a part of Bharathidasan University and its proximity to the main campus has proven advantageous to the institute's development in particular in the field of Computer Science and Biotechnology. The institute shares facilities and enjoys the support form the other departments of the university, especially in basic sciences.

The Bharathidasan Institute of Technology was taken over by Anna University, Trichy in 2007. It is a now a constituent college of Anna University, Trichy.

In 2007 the institute revived the School of Engineering and Technology (SET) offering a six-year integrated M.Tech. program in Computer Science and Engineering, Biotechnology, Bio Informatics and Geo-technology.

The M.Tech. program is integrated with a B.Tech. degree in the respective disciplines. A B.Tech. degree is awarded in three years instead of four for students could earn the required credits. These programs are offered in Tamil and English mediums.

The first-year curriculum is common for all these programs. The second year onward, the academic activities of M.Tech. programs are administered by the respective departments.

== Alumni website ==
Former students of BIT and SET started their alumni website in 2009.
