= List of Tamil Nadu Government Engineering Colleges =

This is a list of engineering colleges operated by the Government of Tamil Nadu.

No.	College Name	Location	District	Affiliation	Estd
1	Government College of Technology, Coimbatore	Coimbatore	Coimbatore	Anna University Autonomous	1945
2	Alagappa Chettiar College of Engineering and Technology	Karaikudi	Sivaganga	Anna University	1952
3	Government College of Engineering, Salem	Karuppur, Salem	Salem	Anna University	1966
4	Government College of Engineering, Tirunelveli	Tirunelveli	Tirunelveli	Anna University	1981
5	Government College of Engineering, Erode	Chithode	Erode	Anna University	1984
6	Thanthai Periyar Government Institute of Technology	Bagayam	Vellore	Anna University	1990
7	Government College of Engineering, Bargur	Bargur	Krishnagiri	Anna University (autonomous)]	1994
8	Government College of Engineering, Thanjavur	Sengipatti	Thanjavur	Anna University	2012
9	Government College of Engineering, Bodinayakkanur	Bodinayakanur	Theni district	Anna University	2012
10	Government College of Engineering, Dharmapuri	Chettikarai	Dharmapuri	Anna University	2013
11	Government College of Engineering, Srirangam	Sedhurappatti	Tiruchirappalli	Anna University	2013
