= Tamil Nadu Teachers Education University =

State university in Chennai, Tamil Nadu

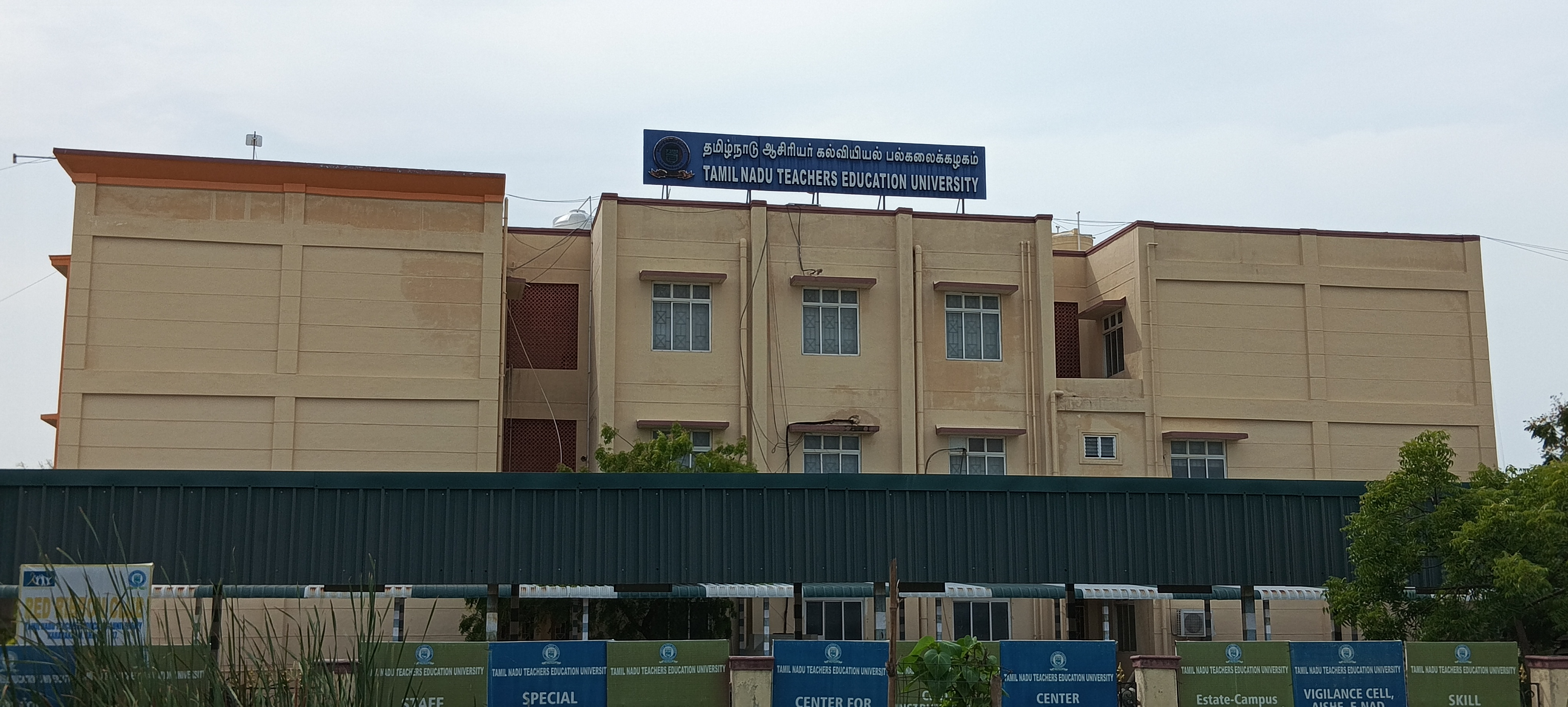
- Type: State university
- Established: 2008; 18 years ago
- Affiliations: UGC
- Chancellor: Governor of Tamil Nadu
- Vice-Chancellor: Vacant
- Location: Chennai, Tamil Nadu, India
- Campus: Urban
- Website: www.tnteu.ac.in

Tamil Nadu Teachers Education University is a state university located in Chennai, Tamil Nadu, which specialises in teachers' education. As on 2012, 665 colleges that are offering Bachelor of Education (B.Ed.) degree courses, are affiliated with the university. Some of these affiliated colleges are also offering Master of Education (M.Ed.) degree courses also. It has its jurisdiction over whole of the State of Tamil Nadu.

== History ==
The Government of Tamil Nadu enacted Act No.33 of 2008 to provide for the establishment and incorporation of Teachers Education University in the State of Tamil Nadu for promoting excellence in teachers education and as a division of Tamil Nadu Education council. Further the Act came into effect from 1 July 2008 by a Gazette Notification issued in G.O.M.S.256, Higher Education (K2) Department, dated 25.6.2008.

The Vice-chancellor post of the university is S. Thangasamy, and S. Kalaichelvan is the present Registrar and Controller of the Examinations I/C.

== See also ==
- List of teacher education schools in India
- List of Tamil Nadu Government's Educational Institutions
