= Khajamalai =

Khajamalai Khajapahadi
- Neighbourhood
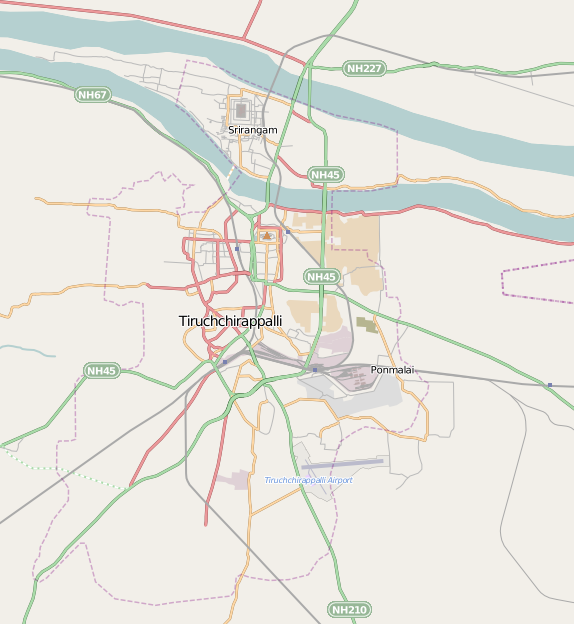
- Location within Tiruchirapalli
- Coordinates: 10°46′39″N 78°41′13″E
- Country: India
- State: Tamil Nadu
- Time zone: UTC+5.30 (IST)
- Postal code: 620001

Khajamalai (Tamil: காஜாமலை) or Kajamalai is a suburb in the city of Tiruchirappalli, Tamil Nadu, India. Khajamalai gets its name from the rock or hill lock located at the heart of the locality. Muslim Sufi Saint Khwaja Syed Ahmed Shah Aulia is interred here. This hillock was called Fakirs Tope during the British Raj.

The Bharathidasan University's Centre of Distance Education and Anna Stadium complex are located here.

== See also ==
- Tiruchirappalli Fort
