= List of Tamil Nadu Government Industrial Training Institutes =

The following is a list of Government Industrial Training Institutes located in Tamil Nadu, India. All institutes are affiliated with the National Council for Vocational Education and Training.

College name	Location	District	Established
Government Industrial Training Institute, Pettai, Tirunelveli	Pettai	Tirunelveli district	1958
Government Industrial Training Institute, Coimbatore	Coimbatore	Coimbatore district	1990
Government Industrial Training Institute, Erode	Erode	Erode district	
Government Industrial Training Institute, Gobichettipalayam	Gobichettipalayam	Erode district	
Government Industrial Training Institute, Nagercoil	Rajakkamangalam	kanyakumari district	1938
SMRV Government Industrial Training Institute (Women), Nagercoil	Nagercoil	Kanyakumari district	1982
Government Industrial Training Institute, Andimadam	Andimadam, Udayarpalayam taluk	Ariyalur district	2007
Government Industrial Training Institute (Women), Namakkal	Namakkal	Namakkal district	1965
Government Industrial Training Institute, Ariyalur	Ariyalur	Ariyalur district	1954
Government Industrial Training Institute, Needamangalam	Needamangalam	Thiruvarur district	1995
Government Industrial Training Institute, Arakkonam	Arakkonam	Ranipet district	July 1966
Government Industrial Training Institute, Thanjavur	Thanjavur	Thanjavur district	1962
Government Industrial Training Institute, Ambasamudram	Ambasamudram	Tirunelveli district	1929
Government Industrial Training Institute, Andipatti	T.V. Renganathapuram (Post), Andipatti Taluk	Theni district	1958
Government Industrial Training Institute, Paramakudi	Paramakudi	Ramanathapuram district	1990
Government Industrial Training Institute, Coimbatore	Coimbatore	Coimbatore district	1938
Government Industrial Training Institute, Perambalur	Perambalur	Perambalur district	2007
Government Industrial Training Institute, Pudukkottai	Pudukkottai	Pudukkottai district	1964
Government Industrial Training Institute, Coonoor	Coonoor, Nilgiris district	The Nilgiris district	1954
Government Industrial Training Institute (Women and men), Pullambadi	Pullambadi	Tiruchirappalli district	1966
Government Industrial Training Institute, Cuddalore	Cuddalore	Cuddalore district	July 1966
Government Industrial Training Institute, Ramanathapuram	Ramanathapuram	Ramanathapuram district	1962
Government Industrial Training Institute (Women), Cuddalore	Cuddalore	Cuddalore district	1929
Government Industrial Training Institute, Mettur	Salem	Salem district	1929
Government Industrial Training Institute, Konam	Konam	Kanniya Kumari	
Government Industrial Training Institute, Hosur	Hosur	Krishnagiri District	1963

== See also ==
- List of schools in Tamil Nadu
