= Tamil Nadu Common Entrance Test =

The Tamil Nadu Common Entrance Test is an eligibility examination for studying post graduate courses like M.E., M.Tech., M.Arch., M.Plan., M.B.A. and M.C.A. in colleges of Tamil Nadu, India. This examination is conducted by Anna University, Chennai, on behalf of the Government of Tamil Nadu.

== Eligibility for TANCET ==
Academic Criteria

1. Candidates who have completed or are in their final year of Graduation from a recognized university can apply. Masters in any discipline of science is also accepted.
2. Candidates who have passed 10+2 or possess a 10+3 years diploma certificate from the State Board of Technical Education are eligible.
3. Candidates with a valid GATE score with qualifying marks in relevant discipline of Engineering /Technology, need not appear for TANCET.
4. Candidates who have a valid GATE score with qualifying marks in Engineering Science (XE) and Life Science (XL), have to appear for TANCET 2020.
5. For MBA: Candidates must possess a Bachelor’s degree with a minimum duration of 3 years with at least a 50% aggregate score (45% in case of reserved category candidates).
6. For MCA: Candidates must possess a 3 year Bachelor’s degree in Mathematics from any recognized university or must have studied mathematics in 11th or 12th grade.
7. For M.E. / M.Tech / M.Arch / M.Plan: Candidates should have passed a Bachelor’s degree exam in the relevant field by obtaining at least 50% marks (45% in case of reserved category candidates). Those who have a B.E / B.Tech / B.Arch Degree or B.Pharm Degree or Master’s Degree in the relevant branch of Science / Arts or 10 + 2 + AMIE or 10 + 3 years diploma (awarded by the State Board of Technical Education) + AMIE can also apply.
8. Candidates in the final year of their graduation are also eligible.
9. Candidates with B.E. / B.Tech degrees obtained through distance mode/weekend courses are not eligible.
10. Sponsored candidates are only offered admission in University Departments of Anna University, Chennai i.e. CEG, ACT, SAP, and MIT campuses.
