= Nehru Memorial College, Sullia =

Coordinates: 12.5541°N 75.3820°E

Nehru Memorial College
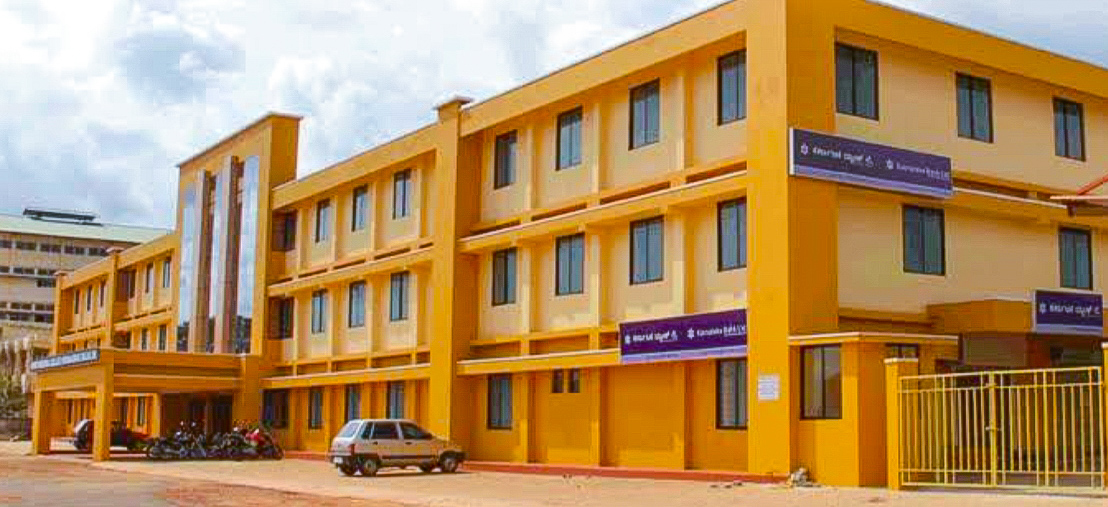
- Front View of Nehru Memorial College, Sullia
- Motto: NAHI JNANENA SADRUSHAM
- Type: Bachelor's Degree, Master's Degree
- Established: 1976
- Founder: Dr. Kurunji Venkatrama Gowda
- Accreditation: NAAC, UGC
- Affiliations: Academy of Liberal Education (R.), Sullia
- Academic affiliations: Mangalore University
- President: Dr. K V Chidananda
- Principal: Mr. Rudrakumar M M
- Location: Kurunjibag, Sullia, Karnataka, 574327, India
- Language: English, Kannada
- Website: www.kvgnmc.org

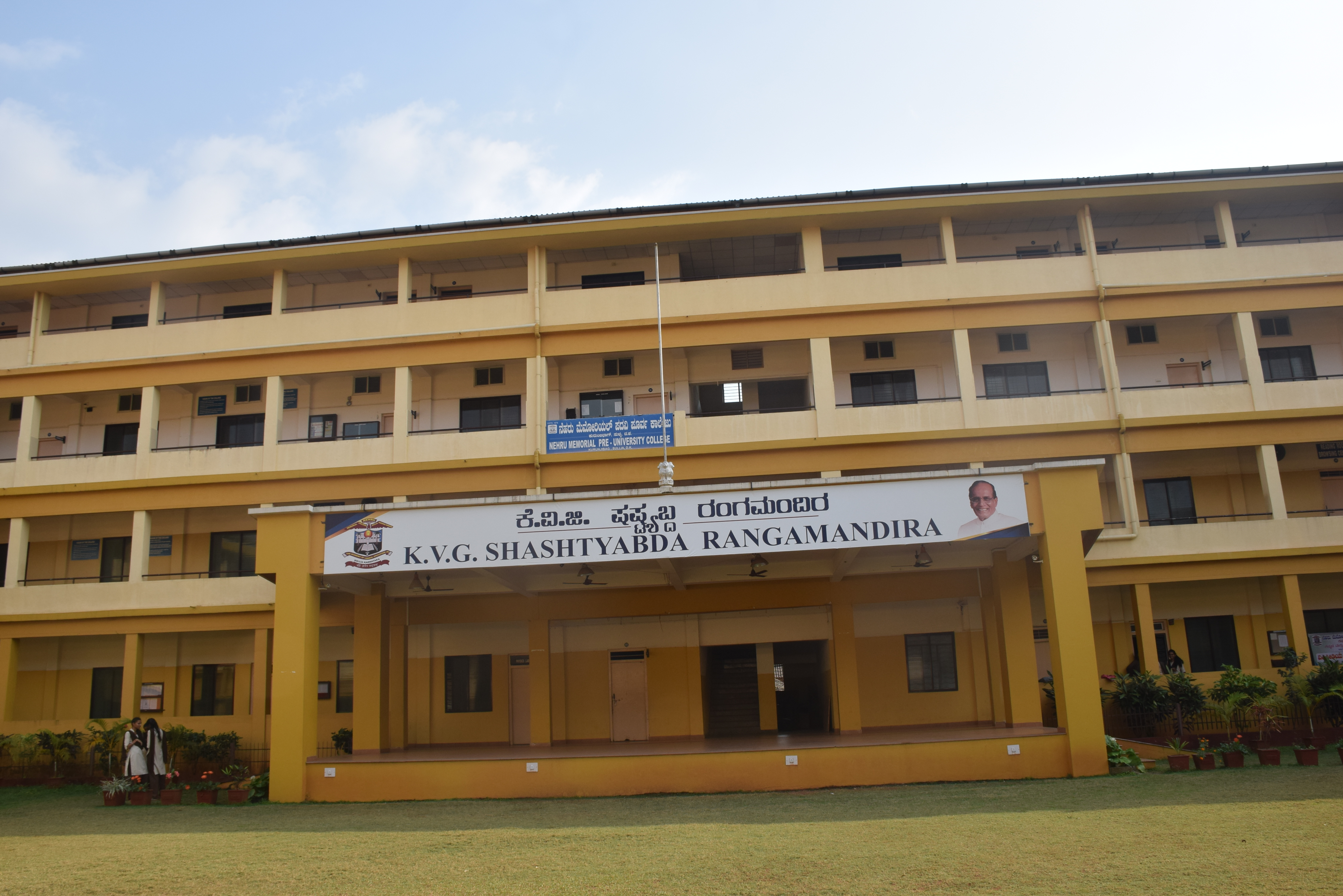
Interior View of NMC Sullia

Nehru Memorial College (NMC) is located in Kurunjibag, Sullia of Karnataka state of India, it is a government aided college serving students seeking Undergraduate and Post-Graduate courses. This college is the premier institution under Academy of Liberal Education (R.) Sullia.

The college is accredited with 'B+' grade by National Assessment and Accreditation Council.

The college provides following Under Graduation courses :

- Bachelor of Arts
- Bachelor of Science
- Bachelor of Commerce
- Bachelor of Business Administration
- Bachelor of Social Works
- Master of Social Works
- Master of Commerce

== Extra curricular activities ==
- NCC - National Cadet Corps
- NSS - National Service Scheme
- Rovers & Rangers
- YRC - Youth Red Cross

== History ==
The main visionary behind this college is Sri Kurunji Venkatramana Gowda, popularly known as the "Architect of Modern Sullia" is also the Founder President of the Academy of Liberal Education. The Academy of Liberal Education is a Registered Society established in 1976 with the sole objective of providing quality education in all branches including professional courses.

== Campus ==
The college campus is called Kurunjibag.

=== Nehru Memorial Pre-University College ===
- PUC Arts
- PUC Commerce
- PUC Science

== See also ==
- Sullia
- KVG College of Engineering
- Mangalore University
