= Anna University Chennai - Regional Office, Madurai =

Anna University Chennai Regional Office, Madurai
- Type: Public
- Established: 2010
- Affiliations: UGC
- Vice-Chancellor: R. Murugesan
- Dean: Prof.Dr.K.Lingadurai
- Location: Madurai, Tamil Nadu, 625019, India; 9.9024464°N 78.038267°E
- Campus: 27.44 acres
- Website: www.autmdu.in

Anna University Chennai - Regional Campus, Madurai formerly Anna University of Technology, Madurai is a technological university located at Madurai, Tamil Nadu, India. It was established in 2010 as a result of a decision to split Anna University into six universities, namely, Anna University, Chennai, Anna University, Chennai - Taramani Campus, Anna University Chennai - Regional Office, Tiruchirappalli, Anna University Chennai - Regional Office, Coimbatore, Anna University Chennai - Regional Office, Tirunelveli and Anna University Chennai - Regional Office, Madurai. It is an accredited university with powers to grant affiliations to colleges and universities conducting graduate and post graduate studies, as well as diploma courses, and is also recognized by the University Grants Commission. Dr. R. Murugesan was the founding vice-chancellor and led a leadership team consisting of Dr. E.B. Perumal Pillai as the first registrar, Dr. G.Elangovan as controller of examinations), Dr. V. Malathi as director of academics, Dr. R. Subramaniam Pillai as director of admissions, Dr. T. Chitravel as director of research), Dr. S. Srinivasan as director of affiliations) and R. Sivaraman as deputy registrar administration.

The university had 46 affiliated colleges and three university campuses, at Madurai, Ramanathapuram and Dindigul.

After operating briefly on the premises of Madurai Kamaraj University, the institution moved to a campus in Keelakuilkudi, Madurai, along National Highway 7. The campus is situated on a hillock adjacent to the Samanar Hills.

On 14 September 2011 a bill was passed to merge back the universities. Though the university was merged with Anna University Chennai, it still functions as the regional campus and offers BTech and MTech degree programmes.

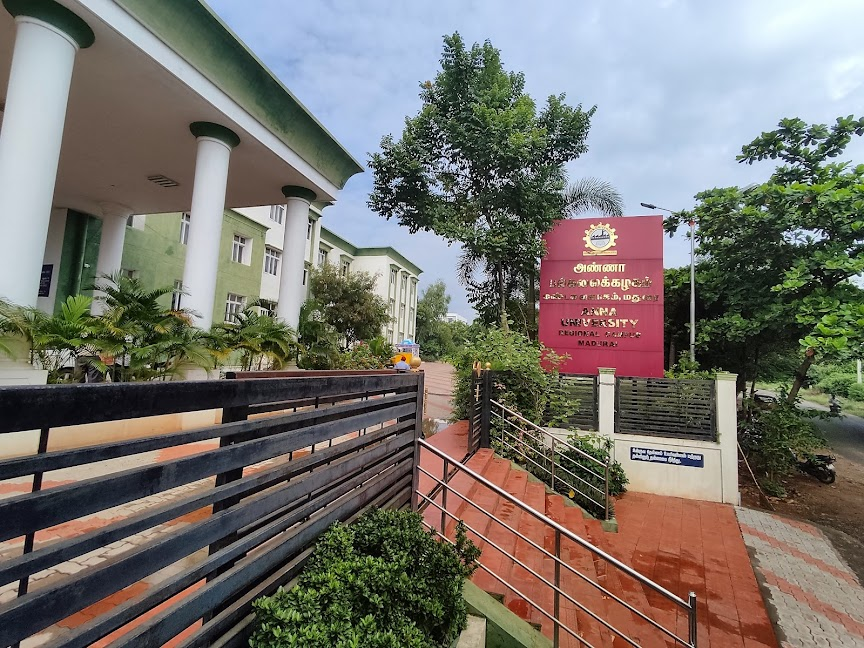
College Entrance

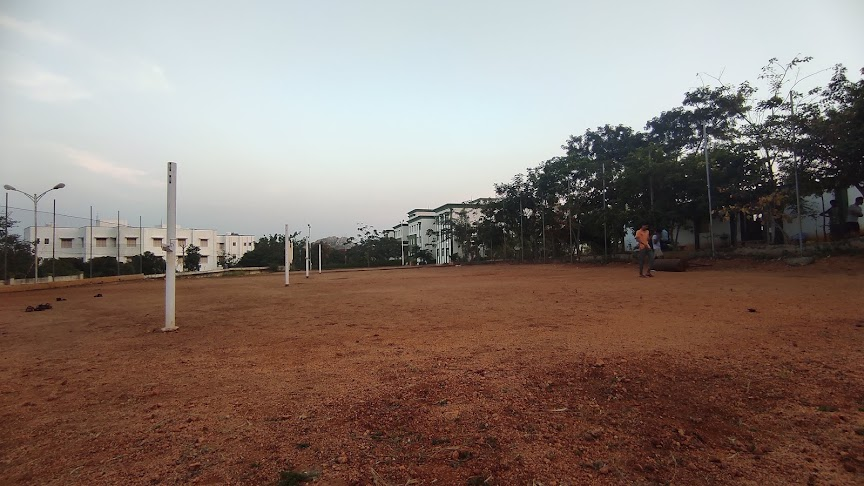
Play ground

14BA Bus stopped at anna university regional campus Madurai.

21 CA bus stopped at anna university regional campus Madurai

Transport Facility

The college has well connected bus routes operated by Tamil Nadu State Transport Corporation Madurai .There are three routes that are available to reach the college without any hassle.

- Route 14BA (numbered 14S on the return trip) connects MGR Bus Stand to the college via Flower Market, S.E.T.C., KK Nagar Arch, Medical College, Thirunagar, and Palanganatham, among other stops. It departs from MGR Bus Stand at 7:25 AM IST in the morning, and the return service (14S) departs from the college at around 4:40–5:10 PM IST.
- Route 21CA links Periyar Bus Stand (PBS) to the college, passing through Arasaradi, Kalavasal, Meenakshipuram, and Keelakuilkudi. It departs from MGR Bus Stand at 7:25 AM IST in the morning, with the return service departing from the college at around 4:40–5:10 PM IST.
- Route 48UT runs between Arappalayam and Thirumangalam, passing Kalavasal, Meenakshipuram, and Kappalur, and departs from Arappalayam Bus Stand, Madurai, at 8:10 AM IST.

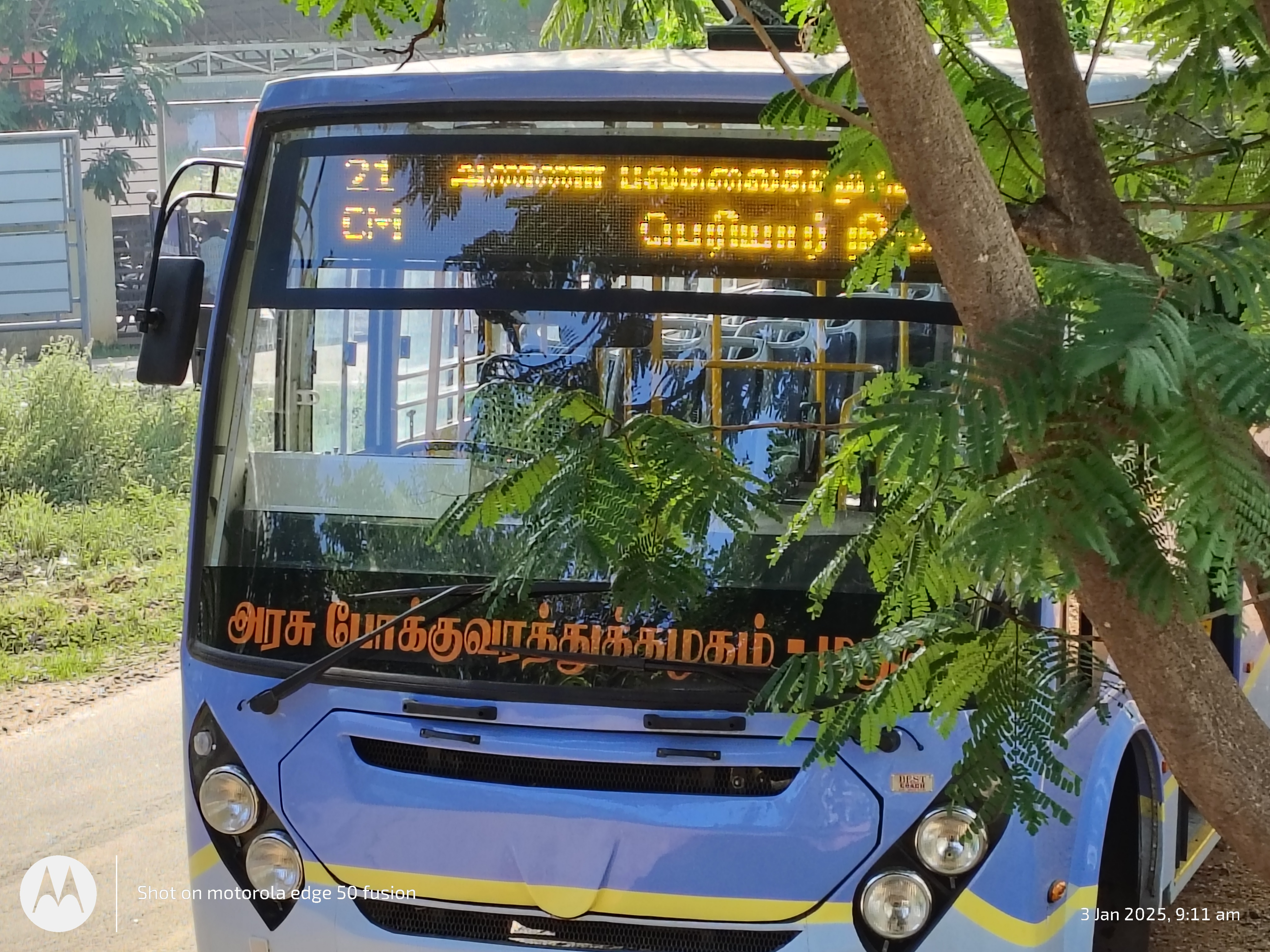
21CM BUS (NOT OPERATIONAL NOW)

== See also ==
- Education in India
- Literacy in India
- List of colleges and institutes in Madurai district
- List of institutions of higher education in Tamil Nadu
