= Anna University Chennai - Regional Office, Tirunelveli =

Anna University Chennai Regional Office, Tirunelveli
- அண்ணா பல்கலைக்கழகம் சென்னை மண்டல அலுவலகம், திருநெல்வேலி
- Motto: Service Through Education
- Type: Public
- Established: 2007; 19 years ago
- Chancellor: Governor of Tamil Nadu
- Location: Tirunelveli, Tamil Nadu, 627007, India; 8.6869403°N 77.7246192°E
- Campus: Palayamkottai, Tirunelveli
- Website: http://www.auttvl.ac.in

Anna University Chennai - Regional Office, Tirunelveli Erstwhile Anna University of Technology Tirunelveli was established on 17 September 2007 from the splitting of Anna University into six universities, namely, Anna University, Chennai, Anna University, Chennai - Taramani Campus, Anna University Chennai - Regional Office, Tiruchirappalli, Anna University Chennai - Regional Office, Coimbatore, Anna University Chennai - Regional Office, Tirunelveli and Anna University Chennai - Regional Office, Madurai. Anna University Tirunelveli is bestowed with powers to grant affiliations to colleges and universities conducting graduate and post graduate courses related to engineering, technology and management.

On 14 September 2011 a bill was passed to merge back the universities.

== Campus ==
The university is functioning from the campus of the Government College of Engineering, Tirunelveli, which is located 3 km. from Palayamkottai on NH 7 towards Kanyakumari, and about 8 km. from the Tirunelveli Railway Station bus stand. Additional campuses are in Thoothukudi and Nagercoil.

== Faculty ==
Designation	Faculty
Regional Director	

== Academics ==
For undergraduate students, the university offers both four year B.Tech and B.E. courses, where B.Tech. degrees are all full-time degrees, while some B.E. degrees are offered for part-time studies as well. The same applies for the two year postgraduate studies, with M.Tech and M.E. In addition the university offers postgraduate two year M.B.A. and three year M.C.A. courses. The university also offers integrated five year M.Sc. degrees in some fields.

== Affiliated colleges ==
65 colleges are affiliated to the university, as well as two University Constituent Colleges, at Thoothukudi and Nagercoil, namely University VOC College of Engineering, Thoothukudi and University College of Engineering, Nagercoil both established in 2009.

== See also ==
- Education in India
- Literacy in India
- List of educational institutions in Tirunelveli district
- List of institutions of higher education in Tamil Nadu
