= Bharathiar University =

State-run university in Coimbatore, Tamil Nadu

- Motto in English: Educate to Elevate
- Type: Public university
- Established: 1982; 44 years ago
- Affiliations: UGC, NAAC, NCTE, ACU, AIU
- Chancellor: Governor of Tamil Nadu
- Vice-Chancellor: Vacant
- Location: Coimbatore, Tamil Nadu, India; 11°2′23.17″N 76°52′43.72″E
- Campus: Urban, 780 acres (315.7 ha)
- Website: www.b-u.ac.in

Bharathiar University is a public state university in Coimbatore, Tamil Nadu, India. Named after Tamil poet Subramania Bharati, the university was established in February 1982 under the provision of Bharathiar University Act, 1981 (Act 1 of 1982) and was recognized by the University Grants Commission (UGC) in 1985.

Bharathiar University celebrated its silver jubilee celebrations on 24 February 2007. Former President of India, A. P. J. Abdul Kalam and former chief minister of Tamil Nadu, M. Karunanidhi, were the chief guests. Bharathiar University provides graduate, masters, M.Phil. and Ph.D. programs in various subjects. The university is known for its stringent Ph.D. evaluation guidelines.

== Affiliated colleges and institutes ==
Institutes affiliated to the university include 22 Government Colleges, 1 Air Force Administrative College, 1 University Post Graduate Extension and Research Centre, 15 Aided Colleges and 109 Self Financing Colleges.

== Departments ==
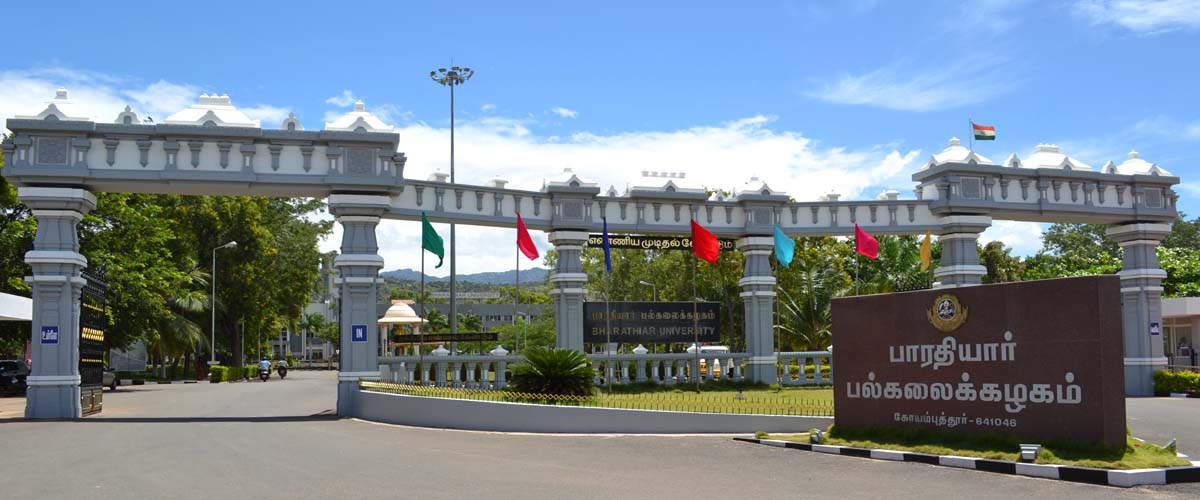
Entrance of Bharathiar University

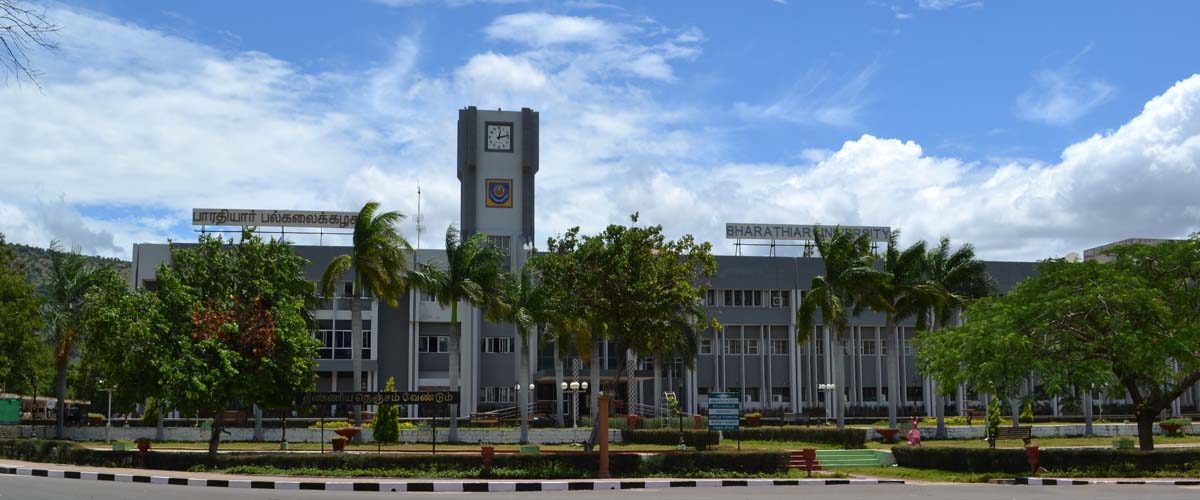
Admin block of Bharathiar University

- Applied Mathematics
- Bharathiar School Of Management And Entrepreneur Development (BSMED)
- Biotechnology
- Biochemistry
- Botany
- Bio-Informatics
- Chemistry
- Commerce
- Computer Science
- Computer Application
- Communication And Media Studies
- Electronics And Instrumentation
- Economics
- Educational Technology
- Education
- Extension, Career Guidance, And Student Welfare
- English And Foreign Language
- Environmental Science
- History
- Human Genetics and Molecular Biology
- Information Technology
- Library & Information Science
- Linguistics
- Microbial - Biotechnology
- Mathematics
- Medical Physics
- Nano Science And Technology
- Physical Education
- Psychology
- Physics
- Statistics
- Social Work
- Sociology and Population Studies
- Tamil
- Textiles and Apparel Design
- Women's Studies
- Zoology
- Education(SDE)
- Post Graduate Extension and Research Centre, Erode

== Rankings ==
University rankings

General – India
- NIRF (Overall) (2024): 44
- NIRF (Universities) (2024): 26

Bharathiar University was ranked 44 overall and 26th among universities by the National Institutional Ranking Framework in 2024. The university was ranked 221st in QS Asia University Rankings 2025.
