= Bharathidasan University =

Public university in Tiruchirappalli, Tamil Nadu, India

- Type: Public
- Established: 1982; 44 years ago
- Affiliations: UGC
- Chancellor: Governor of Tamil Nadu
- Vice-Chancellor: Vacant
- Location: Tiruchirappalli, Tamil Nadu, India; 10°40′29″N 78°44′39″E
- Campus: Palkalaiperur, Tiruchirappalli
- Website: www.bdu.ac.in

Bharathidasan University (BDU) is a university in the city of Tiruchirappalli, Tamil Nadu, India. It is located on Tiruchirappalli-Pudukkottai National Highway 336. It has affiliated colleges in the districts of Ariyalur district, Karur, Nagapattinam, Perambalur, Pudukkottai, Thanjavur, Tiruvarur and Tiruchirapalli. It is a recognised university, supported by the University Grants Commission of India. All major faculties of science and arts are represented. The university has totally 4 Faculties, 16 Schools, 37 Departments and 29 Specialized Research Centres. It has its jurisdiction over districts of Tiruchirappalli, Thanjavur and Pudukkottai.

The University Departments/Schools are offering 151 programmes including 40 PG programmes in M.A., M.Sc. and M.Tech. The above programmes are conducted under the Choice Based Credit System (CBCS) in Semesters: 31 M.Phil., 33 Ph.D., 19 P.G. Diploma, 11 Diploma and 10 Certificates. In addition to the regular teaching programmes in the Departments and Schools, the university under its Distance Education mode is conducting 15 UG and 26 PG programmes. All the UG and PG programmes are conducted under non-semester system and MCA and MBA programmes are conducted under semester system along with the regular programmes. The MCA and MBA programmes conducted under this mode are very popular.

== Faculties and schools ==
The university has the following faculties and schools:

- Faculty of Arts
  - School of Economics and Commerce & Financial Studies
  - School of Education
  - School of Social Sciences
  - School of Skill Development & Entrepreneurship
  - School of Performing Arts
- Faculty of Indian and other Languages
  - School of English and Foreign Languages
  - School of Indian Languages
- Faculty of Science, Engineering and Technology
  - School of Basic Medical Sciences
  - School of Biotechnology & Genetic Engineering
  - School of Chemistry
  - School of Computer Science and Engineering
  - School of Engineering and Technology
  - School of Environmental Sciences
  - School of Geography
  - School of Geology
  - School of Library Information Science
  - School of Life Sciences
  - School of Marine Sciences
  - School of Mathematical Sciences
  - School of Physics
- Faculty of Management
  - School of Management Studies

== Hostels ==
=== Men's ===
- Cavery men's hostel
- Bhavani men's hostel
- Vaigai men's hostel
- Porunai men's hostel
- Sindhu men's hostel

=== Women's ===
- Ponni women's hostel
- Mullai women's hostel
- Kurunji women's hostel
- Gangai women's hostel

== Affiliated colleges ==
=== Autonomous arts and science colleges ===
1. Government Arts College, Karur
2. Government Arts College, Kumbakonam
3. H. H. The Rajah's College, Pudukkottai
4. Rajah Serfoji Government College, (Autonomous) Thanjavur - 613 005.
5. Thanthai Periyar Government Arts and Science College (Autonomous), Tiruchirappalli - 620 023.
6. Government College for Women, Kumbakonam
7. Kunthavai Naacchiyaar Government Arts College for Women
8. Government Arts College for Women, Pudukkottai
9. A.V.V.M. Sri Pushpam College (Autonomous), Poondi - 613 503.
10. Bishop Heber College, (Autonomous) Tiruchirappalli - 620 017
11. Jamal Mohamed College, (Autonomous) Tiruchirappalli - 620 020.
12. National College (Autonomous), Tiruchirappalli - 620 001
13. Nehru Memorial College, (Autonomous) Puthanampatti - 621 007.
14. St. Joseph's College, Tiruchirappalli
15. A.D.M. College for Women
16. Holy Cross College (Autonomous), Tiruchirappalli - 620 002.
17. Seethalakshmi Ramaswami College
18. Bharath College of Science & Management, Trichy Road, Near New Bus Stand, Thanjavur - 613 005.
19. Edayathangudi G.S. Pillai Arts & Science College, Nagapattinam - 611 001.
20. J.J. College of Arts and Science (Autonomous), Namanasamuthiram, Pudukkottai - 622 404
21. Srimad Andavan Arts and Science College
22. Thanthai Hans Roever College, Perambalur - 621 212.
23. Valluvar College of Science and Management, Kodaiyur, Aravakurichi Taluk, Karur - 639 003.
24. Bon Secours College for Women, Vilar Bye pass Road, Thanjavur - 613 006.
25. Cauvery College for Women (Autonomous), Annamalai Nagar, Tiruchirappalli - 620 018
26. Dhanalakshmi Srinivasan College of Arts & Science for Women, Perambalur - 621 212
27. Sengamala Thayaar Educational Trust Women's College, Mannargudi - 614 001

=== Non-autonomous arts and science colleges ===
1. A.A. Government Arts College, Musiri - 621 201.
2. Dr. Kalaignar Government Arts College, Kulithalai (Sattamandra Ponvizha), Ayyar Malai, Kulithalai, Karur - 639 120
3. Dr. Puratchi Thalaivar M.G.R.Govt. Arts & Science College, (Boys Higher Secondary School) Kudavasal 612 601, Thiruvarur District
4. Government Arts & Science College(Co-Education), Veppanthattai, Perambalur.
5. Government Arts and Science College, Community Hall, Amman Nagar, Aravakurichi TK, Karur Dt - 639201.
6. Government Arts and Science College, Govt. Boys Higher Secondary School Campus, Thirumayam TK - Pudukottai Dt - 622507.
7. Government Arts and Science College, Old Block Development Office, Poothalur, Thanjavur Dt. - 613 102.
8. Government Arts and Science college, Govt. Polytechnic campus, Aranthangi - 614 616.
9. Government Arts and Science College, Jayankondam, Ariyalur Dt. - 621 802.
10. Government Arts and Science College, Kadambadi Main Road, Opp. ADJ Dharamambal Polytechnic, Nagappattinam - 611 001.
11. Government Arts and Science College, Karambakudi, Pudukkottai District
12. Government Arts and Science College, Lalgudi - 621 601
13. Government Arts and Science College, Perambalur -621 107.
14. Government Arts and Science College, Peravurani, Thanjavur District
15. Government Arts and Science College, Punchayat Union Model Primary School, Pannankombu, Manapparai TK, Tiruchirappalli 621306
16. Government Arts and Science College, Regional ITI Campus, Kalaignar Nagar, Alangudi TK - Pudukottai - 622301
17. Government Arts and Science College, Tharagampatti, Karur (Dt.)
18. Government Arts College, Ariyalur - 621 713.
19. Government Arts College, Tiruchirappalli - 620 022
20. Government College of Arts and Science, Govt. Boys Higher Secondary School Campus, South Street, Nannilam - Thiurvarur (Dt.) 610 105.
21. Government College of Arts and Science, Opp. To Kasturibai Gandhi Kanniya Gurukulam, Nagai Road, Vedaranyam - 614 810.
22. Government College of Arts and Science, Govt. Higher Secondary School Campus, Inamkulathur - 621 203
23. Government College of Arts and Science, Thandalaichery, Velur Post,

Thiruthuraipoondi- 614 715, Thiruvarur (Dt.)

1. M.R. Government Arts College, Mannargudi - 614 001.
2. Thiru. Vi. Ka. Government Arts College, Thiruvarur - 610 003.
3. Government Arts and Science College (Women), Orathanad - 614 625
4. Government Arts and Science College for Women, Jamiya Elementary School Campus, Jinnah Street, Koothanallur, Tiruvarur Dt. - 614101
5. Government Arts and Science College for Women, Veppur, Perambalur District
6. Ganesar Senthamil College of Arts and Science, Melaisivapuri - 622 403.
7. Khadir Mohideen College, Adirampattinam - 614 701
8. Rajah's College, Thiruvaiyaru - 613 204.
9. S.K.S.S. Arts College, Thiruppanandal - 612 504.
10. Tamilavel Umamaheswaranar Karanthai Arts College, Thanjavur - 613 002.
11. Urumu Dhanalakshmi College, Tiruchirappalli - 620 019.
12. Aadhavan Arts and Science College, Alathur Village Chettiyappatti Panchayat, Manapparai T.K., Tiruchirappalli-621 306
13. ABI & ABI College, Vayalur, Thanjavur - 613 003.
14. Adaikalamatha College, Arun Nagar, Vallam, Thanjavur - 613 403.
15. Annai College of Arts & Science, Kumbakonam-612 503.
16. Annai Vailankanni Arts & Science College, V.O.C. Nagar Thanjavur 613 007
17. Arputha College of Arts & Science, Arputha Nagar, Vamban - 622 303
18. Arungarai Amman College of Arts & Science, Karur District - 639 202
19. Bharath College of Science & Management, South Garden, Thanjavur - 613 007.
20. Cambridge College of Arts and Science, Vettamangalam, Karur District - 639 117
21. Care College of Arts & Science, No.27, Thayanur Village, Trichy 620 009
22. Christhu Raj College, Panjapur, Edamalaipatti Pudur, Tiruchirappalli - 620 012
23. CSI - Bishop Solomon Doraisawmy College of Arts and Science, Karur - 639001
24. Dharmambal Ramasamy Arts & Science College, Orathanadu T.k.Thanjavur - 614 625.
25. Dr. Nallikuppusamy Arts College, Manakkarambai, Thanjavur - 613 003.
26. Elizabeth College of Arts and Science, Annamangalam(P.O), Vepanthattai T.K, Perambalur - 620 102
27. Enathi Rajappa College of Arts & Science, Enathi Post, Pattukkottai - 614 615
28. Imayam College of Arts & Science, Thuraiyur- 621 206
29. Indra Ganesan College of Arts & Science, Madurai Main Road, Manikandam Post, Tiruchirappalli 620 012
30. Jairams Arts and Science College NH-7 Salem Bye-Pass Road, (Near) Mahamariamman Temple Karur -639 002.
31. Jesu Arts and Science College (Co-Educational), Alangudi, Pudukkottai Dist. -622 301.
32. Kokila Arts & Science College (Co-education), Viralimalai, Manaparai Road, Pudukkottai
33. Kongu College of Arts & Science, Deeran Chinnamalai Nagar, Karur - 639 006.
34. Krishna College of Arts and Science, UGR Nagar, Kolluthannipatty, Melapaguthi Village, Kadavur (Tk), Karur (Dt.) -621 301
35. Kurinji College of Arts & Science, Green Ways Road, Tiruchirappalli - 620 002.
36. M.I.E.T. Arts & Science College, Gundur, Tiruchirappalli - 620 007.
37. Mahatma Arts and Science College, Ariyur Village, Illuppur Taluk, Pudukkottai District- 622 101
38. Maruthu Pandiyar College, Vallam (P.O.), Thanjavur - 613 403
39. MASS College of Arts and Science, Kumbakonam - 612 501
40. Meenakshi Chandrasekaran College of Arts & Science, Pattukkottai - 614 626
41. Meenakshi Ramasamy Arts and Science College, Udaiyarpalayam, Ariyalur-.621 804.
42. Modern Arts and Science College, 35A, Sannathi Street, Jayankondam, - 621 802
43. Mother Terasa College of Arts and Science, Mettusalai, Veerappatti Village, Illupur (PO), Pudukkottai Dt. - 622 102
44. Naina Mohamed College of Arts & Science, Rajendrapuram, Pudukkottai - 614 624
45. National Arts and Science College TrichyRoad, Jayankondam Ariyalur Dt. 621 802
46. Navalar Na. Mu. Venkatasamy Nattar Thiruvarul Kallori, Kabilar Nagar, Vennatrankarai, Thanjavur - 613 003.
47. Nethaji Subash Chandra Bose College, Thiruvarur - 614 001
48. Paventhar Bharathidasan College of Arts & Science, Pudukkottai - 622 515.
49. Rajagiri Dawood Batcha College of Arts & Science, Papanasam, Thanjavur - 614 207
50. S.K. Arts & Science College Thamaraipulam, Vedaranyam 614 809
51. S.K. College of Arts and Science, Melavasal, Mannargudi, Thiruvarur District- 614 014.
52. S.R.V. College of Arts & Science, Pirattiyur, Tiruchirappalli - 620 009
53. Sembodai R.V. Arts & Science College, Vedaraniyam T.K., Nagapattinam-614 809
54. Sir Issac Newton Arts and Science College, Pappakoil Village, Anthanapettai (PO), Nagappatinam Dt. - 611 001
55. Sri Amaraavathi College of Arts and Science, Velliannai, Karur - 639 908
56. Sri Meenakshi Vidiyal College of Arts & Science, Valanadu Kaikatty, Marungapuri Tk, Tiruchirappalli Dt. 621 305
57. Sri Sankara Arts and Science College, Asur, Kumbakonam, 612 501
58. Sri Venkateshwara College of Arts & Science, Peravurani - 614 804.
59. Srinivasan College of Arts and Science, Perambalur -621 212
60. SRM Trichy Arts & Science College, Irungalur Village, Mannachanallur TK, Tiruchirappalli - 621 105
61. St. Peter's Arts and Science College, Melaneduvai Post, Adimadam, Udayarpalayam Tk, Ariyalur (Dt) - 621 801
62. Sudharsan College of Arts Science, Perumanadu Villages, Iluppur Taluk, Pudukkottai Dt
63. Swami Dayananda College of Arts & Science, Tiruvarur - 612 610
64. Swami Vivekananda Arts & Science College, Sami Arul Nagar, Vallam, Thanjavur - 613 007
65. Vailankanni Matha Arts and Science College, ECR Main Road, Prathabaramapuram, Keelvelur TK, Nagapattinam 611 111.
66. Valluvar College of Science and Management, Kodaiyur, Aravakurichi Taluk, Karur - 639 003
67. Vikas College of Arts & Science, Inamkulathur, Srirangam TK, Tiruchirappalli 621 303.
68. ABC College of Arts and Science for Women, Erichy, Chithamaraviduthi Po, Aranthangi (Tk), Pudukkottai 614 622.
69. Aiman College of Arts & Science for Women, K. Sathanur, Tiruchirappalli - 620 021.
70. Annai Ayesha Arts & Science College for Women, College Main Road, Valikandapuram, Perambalur Dt 621 115.
71. Annai Khadeeja Arts and Science College for Women, Kandanivayal Village, Edayathimangalam Po., Manamelkudi Tk., Pudukkottai (Dt.) - 6214620.
72. Annai Women's College, Aurobindo Nagar, Vennaimalai, Karur 639 006.
73. Arasu College of Arts & Science for Women, Panduthakaran Pudhur, Punjai Kadambankurichy Village, Manmangalam TK, Karur Dt. - 639006.
74. Auxilium College of Arts and Science for Women, Regunathapuram Village, Alangudi Taluk, Pudukottai Dt - 622 302
75. Bharathi Vidyalaya College of Arts & Science (Women), Trichy Road,

Thirugokaranam(PO), Pudukkottai - 622002

1. Bon Secours Arts and Science College for Women, Ruckmanipalayam, Mannargudi 614 001, Thiruvarur Dt.
2. Bon Secours College for Women, Vilar Bye pass Road, Thanjavur - 613 006.
3. Chidambaram Pillai College for Women, Manachanallur, Tiruchirappalli - 621 005.
4. Dr. M. Sivakannu Women's Arts & Science College, Ayakkaranpulam, Vedaranyam (Tk) Nagapattinam Dt. 614 707
5. Idhaya College of Women, Sakkottai, Kumbakonam 612 001.
6. Karur Velalar college of Arts Science for Women, SF.No. 14/3, Kuppam Village, Karur- Erode Main Road, Kuppam (PO), Aravakurichi Tk., Karur Dt. 639 111.
7. M.I.T. College of Arts & Science for Women, Annai Nagar, Musiri TK, Tiruchirappalli Dt. - 621 211.
8. Meera College of Arts and Science for Women, Thanjavur Main Road, Keelapalur Post, Ariyalur - 621707
9. Mother Gnanamma Women's College of Arts and Science, Varadarajanpet,

Jayankondam Taluk, Ariyalur District - 621 805.

1. Queens College of Arts & Science for Women, Punal Kulam, Kandarvakottai, Pudukkottai - 613 303
2. Rabiammal Ahamed Maideen College for Women, Thiruvarur - 610 002.
3. S.M.K. College of Arts and Science for Women, Kilakuvadi, Thuraiyur, Tiruchirappalli Dt.
4. Servite Arts and Science College for Women, T.Iadaiayapatti, Kalladai Village, Thogaimalai Panchayat, Karur - 621 313
5. Shrimati Indira Gandhi College, Tiruchirappalli - 620 002.
6. Sri Bharathi Arts and Science College for Women, Pudukkottai 622 303
7. Sri Sarada Niketan College of Science for Women, Karur - 639 005.
8. Sri Saradha College for Women, Perambalur - 621 212.
9. Subashakthi College of Arts and Science for Women, Sathiyamangalam Post, Kulithalai T.K., Karur Dt. - 639 120
10. Sulthana Abdullah Rowther College for Women, Thiruvarur - 614 101
11. Uswathun Hasana Mamaji Haji Abdul Latheef Women's College, Pallapatti, Karur - 639 205
12. Vinayaga College of Arts and Science for Women, Karuppur, Keelapaluvur, Ariyalur Dt-621 707

== Notable faculty ==
- Muthusamy Lakshmanan, theoretical physicist (Shanti Swarup Bhatnagar laureate)

== Rankings ==
University rankings

General – India
- NIRF (Overall) (2024): 55
- NIRF (Research) (2024): 48
- NIRF (Universities) (2024): 36

The National Institutional Ranking Framework (NIRF) ranked Bharathidasan University 55th overall, 48th in Research and 36th among universities in 2024.
