= Anna University =

Public university in Chennai, India

Coordinates: 13.01268°N 80.236362°E

- Other name: AU
- Motto: Progress through Knowledge
- Affiliations: UGC, AICTE, AIU, ACU
- Chancellor: Governor of Tamil Nadu
- Vice-Chancellor: Vacant (K. Gopal, IAS–Chairman of Convener Committee)
- Dean: K. S. Easwarakumar (CEG); R. Jayavel (ACT); K. Ravichandran (MIT); K. R. Sitalaksmi (SAP)
- Students: 18,372
- Undergraduates: 11,049
- Postgraduates: 4,455
- Doctoral students: 2,828
- Location: Chennai, Tamil Nadu, 600025, India
- Campus: Urban, 185 acres
- Website: annauniv.edu

Anna University is a public state university located in Chennai, Tamil Nadu, India. The main campus is in Guindy. It was originally established on 4 September 1978 and is named after C. N. Annadurai, former Chief Minister of Tamil Nadu.

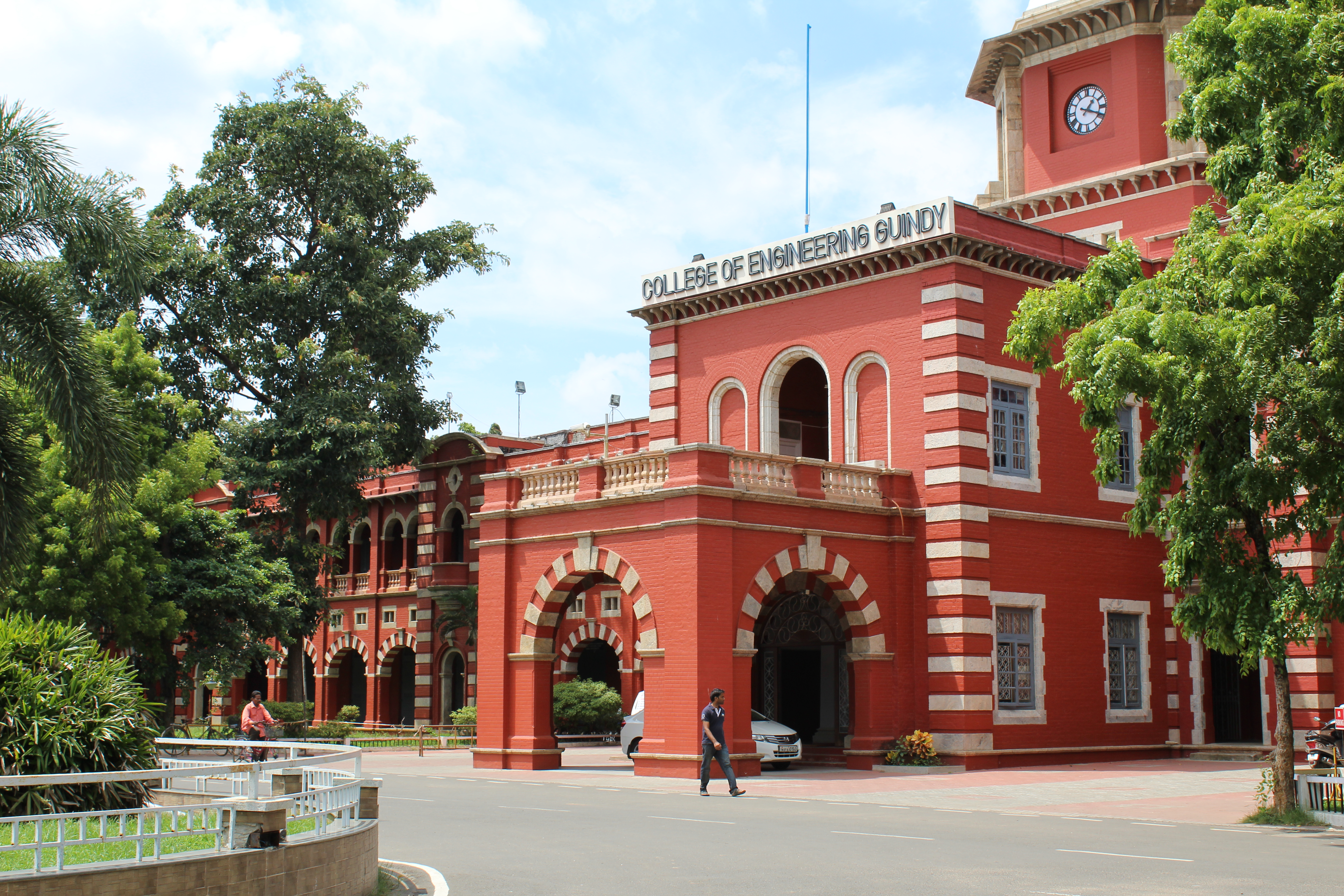
College of Engineering, Guindy

== History and structure ==
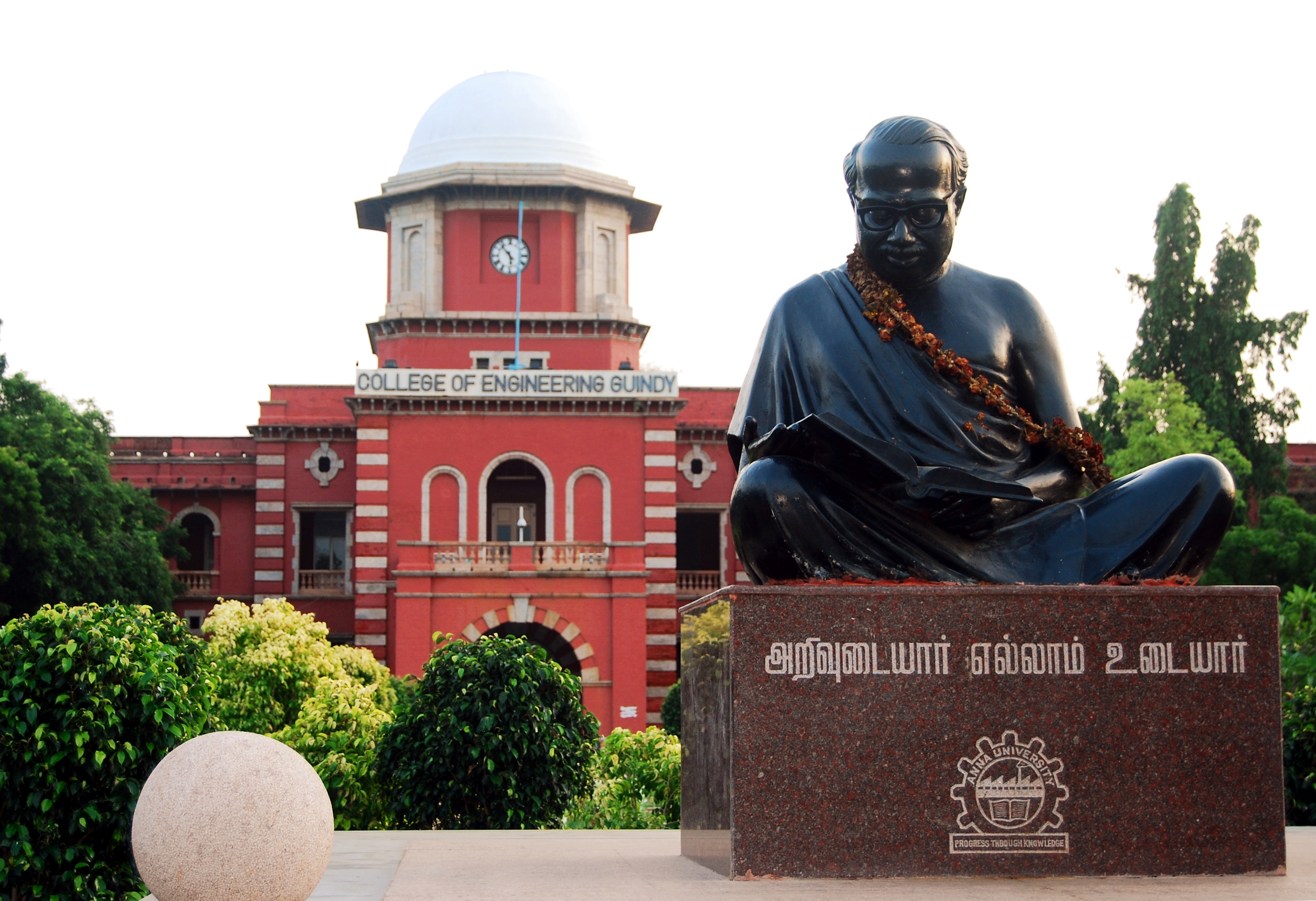
Statue of C N Annadurai in College of Engineering, Guindy campus

Anna University (Chennai) comprises four colleges - the principal seat College of Engineering, Guindy (CEG, Guindy Campus), Alagappa College of Technology (ACT, Guindy Campus), Madras Institute of Technology (MIT, Chromepet Campus) and School of Architecture and Planning (SAP, Guindy Campus).

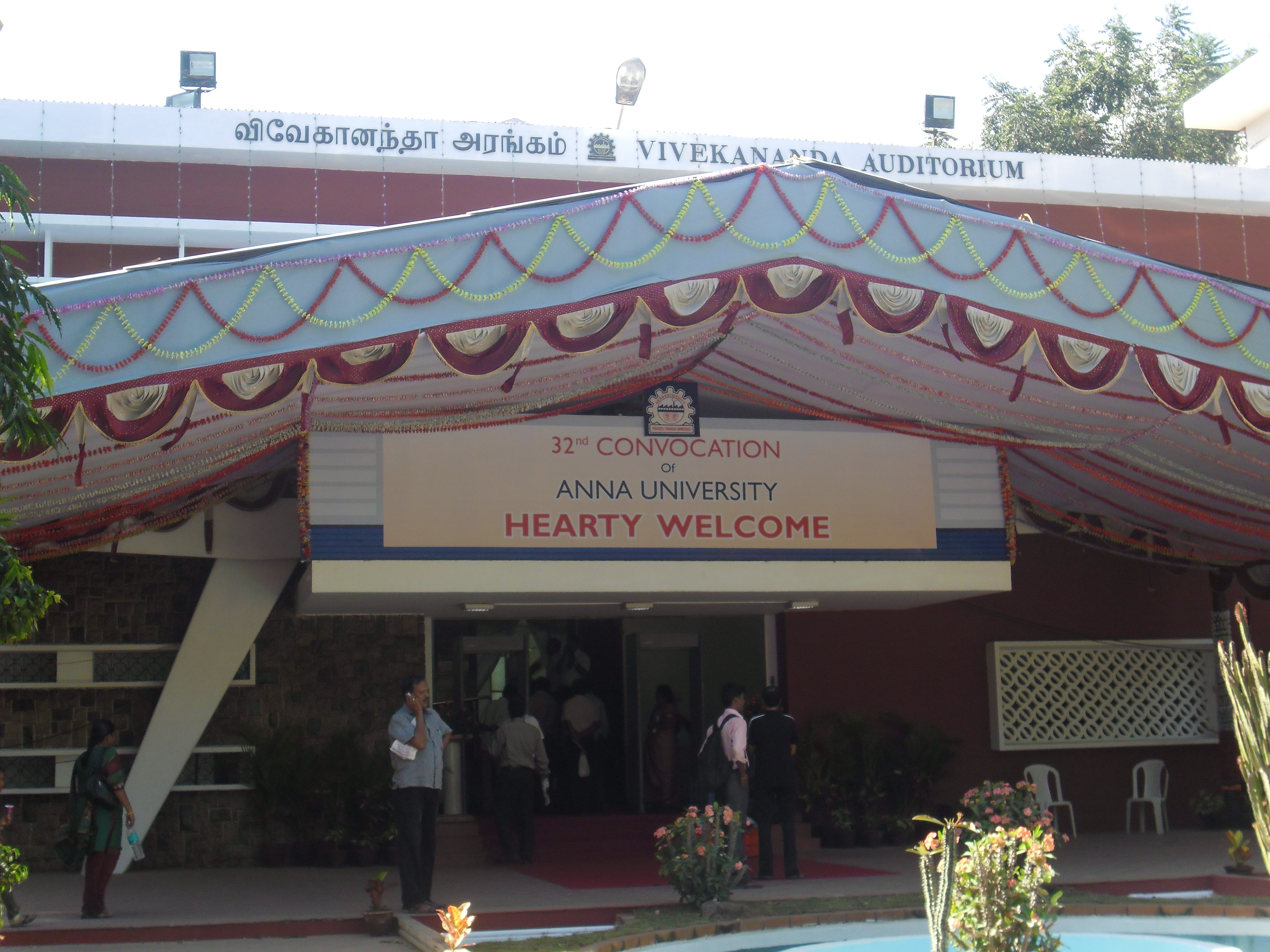
Vivekananda auditorium at CEG

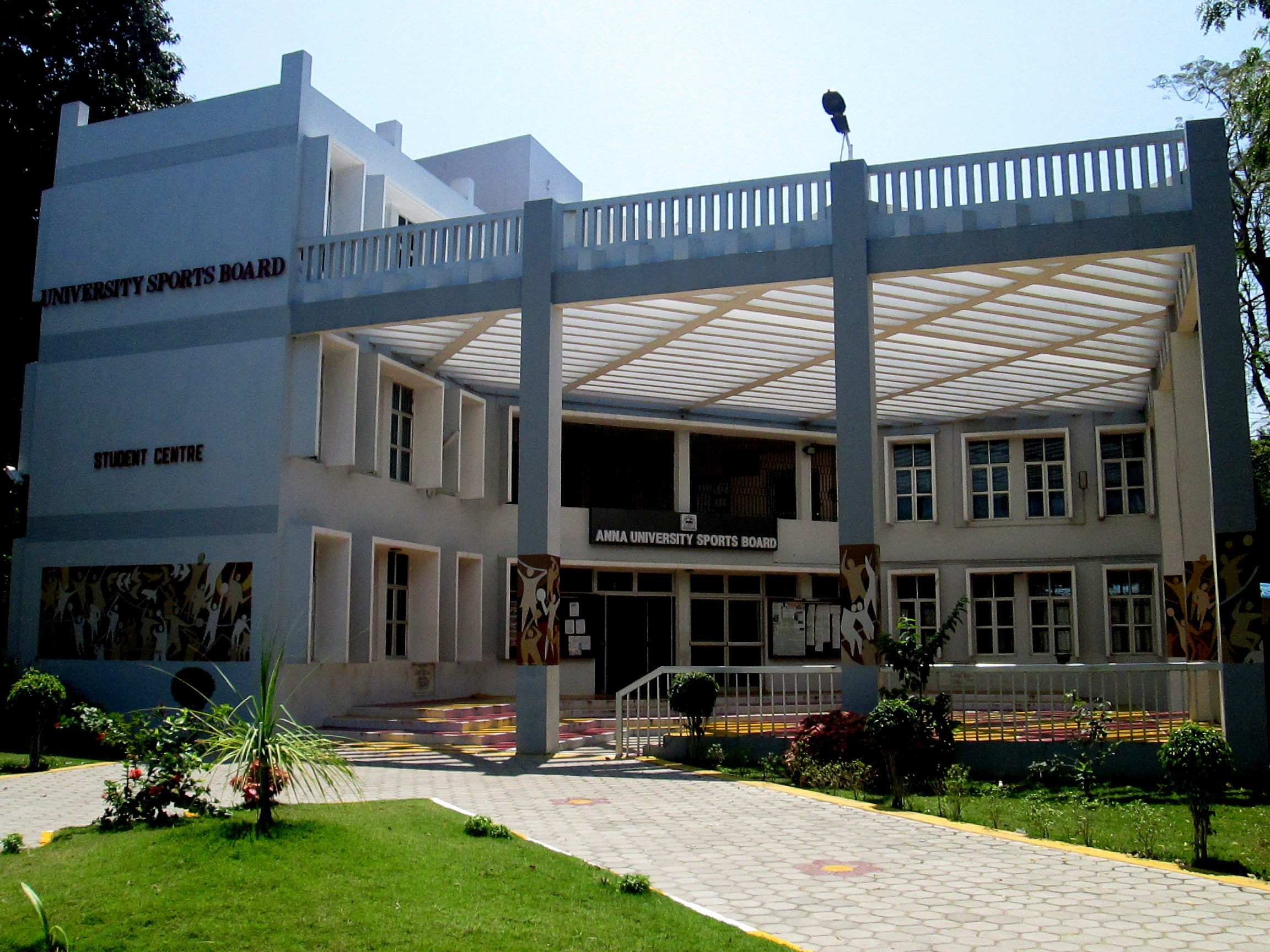
Sports Board building

The first version of Anna University was formed in 1978 by Chief Minister M. G. Ramachandran's Government and various governments changed the varsity's structure and affiliation scope repeatedly. In 2001, under the Anna University Amendment Act of 2001, the erstwhile Anna University became an affiliating university, taking under its wings all the engineering colleges in Tamil Nadu. This included six government engineering colleges, three government-aided private institutions, and 426 self-financed colleges. On 1 February 2007, as a result of a Government of Tamil Nadu decision, the university was split into six constituent universities: Anna University, Chennai; Anna University of Technology, Chennai; Anna University of Technology, Tiruchirappalli; Anna University of Technology, Coimbatore; Anna University of Technology Tirunelveli and Anna University of Technology, Madurai. The institutes were formally created in 2010. On 14 September 2011 during period of Ex CM Jayalalithaa, a bill was passed to re-merge the universities. The merger was finalized in August 2012.

In 2011 and 2012, the constituents colleges were merged back to a single affiliating university and the four regional universities continue to function as a regional campus of the university.

=== School of Architecture and Planning ===
The School of Architecture and Planning was established as a Department of Architecture of the University of Madras in 1957 and was located in the Alagappa College of Technology. The department was later renamed as the School of Architecture and Planning and shifted to its own independent campus in 1968. It became a constituent college of the University at its founding. It started to functions as two departments namely Department of Architecture and Department of Planning from 2005 till date.

SAP has a Centre for Human Settlements (CHS) which is an autonomous Centre of the Anna University that was established in 1980. It is an interdisciplinary Centre offering Consultancy, Training, Research and Extension services in the areas related to Urban and Regional Planning, Development and Management. The Quality Improvement Program (QIP) Cell was established by the AICTE at SAP campus and has provided the research facilities for teachers of other architectural institutions besides providing admission to PG degree course.

== Admissions ==
A common entrance test was used as a basis until 2006. For 2007, grades were a planned replacement. Post-graduate admission process is carried out through TANCET and GATE scores.

== Academics ==
The university offers courses in engineering and technology through its affiliated colleges and follows a dual semester system. Every year the university conducts examinations for the even semester in May–June and for an odd semester in November–December.

University rankings

General – international
- QS (World) (2025): 383
- QS (Asia) (2024): 179
- Times (World) (2024): 501-600
- Times (Asia) (2024): 119
- Times (Emerging) (2022): 251–300

General – India
- NIRF (Overall) (2024): 20
- NIRF (Research) (2024): 17
- NIRF (Universities) (2024): 13

Engineering – India
- NIRF (2024): 14

Business/Management – India
- NIRF (2024): 69

Architecture – India
- NIRF (2024): 34

== Incidents ==
=== Sexual assault incident ===
On 25 December 2024, a second-year female engineering student at Anna University was sexually assaulted by two men inside the campus. The incident took place in the early hours of the morning after the survivor and her male friend returned from a Christmas mass at a nearby church. The two students were sitting in a secluded area of the campus when the assailants attacked the male student and then proceeded to sexually assault the woman. The survivor immediately filed a police complaint, and a case was registered under Section 64 of the BNSS (rape). The perpetrator was arrested and detained under the Tamil Nadu Goondas act and was lodged into Puzhal prison.

== Affiliated colleges ==
The university's campus is in Chennai. The university has satellite campuses in Coimbatore, Tiruchirappalli, Madurai and Tirunelveli. The university also runs engineering colleges at Villupuram, Tindivanam, Arani and Kanchipuram in Chennai region, Erode and Bargur in Coimbatore region, Panruti, Pattukkottai, Thirukkuvalai and Ariyalur in Tiruchirapalli region, Ramanathapuram and Dindigul in Madurai region, Nagercoil and Thoothukudi in Tirunelveli region.

== Notable alumni ==
- A Lalitha, first female engineer from India
- A. C. Muthiah, Indian industrialist and former President of BCCI
- Archna Sharma, Indian Actress.
- Nagarjuna, Telugu film actor
- Anumolu Ramakrishna, deputy managing director of Larsen & Toubro
- Crazy Mohan, Tamil comedy actor, script writer and playwright
- Kavithalaya Krishnan Indian film and television actor
- Dhiraj Rajaram, founder & chairman of Mu Sigma Inc
- Gopalaswami Parthasarathy, former Indian High Commissioner to Pakistan, Australia and Myanmar and Chancellor of Central University of Jammu
- Kanuri Lakshmana Rao, architect of India's water management, Former Union Minister of Irrigation & Power and recipient of the Padma Bhushan
- Krishnakumar Natarajan, co- & former executive chairman of Mindtree
- Krishnamachari Srikkanth, former Indian cricket captain and former chairman, National Selection Committee of the Indian Cricket Team
- Kutraleeswaran, long-distance swimmer and Guinness Book of World Records holder
- Madhan Karky, Tamil film lyricist
- Mendu Rammohan Rao, former dean emeritus, Indian School of Business
- Munirathna Anandakrishnan, former chairman, Indian Institute of Technology, Kanpur and former vice-chancellor, Anna University
- N. Mahalingam, & former chairman, Sakthi Group and former chairman, Ethiraj College for Women
- P. S. Veeraraghavan, director of Vikram Sarabhai Space Centre
- R. K. Baliga, developer of the Electronics City in Bangalore, India
- P. V. Nandhidhaa, Indian chess player, India's 17th Woman Grandmaster.
- Ponnambalam "Poondi" Kumaraswamy, engineer, mathematician, and hydrologist
- Raj Reddy, Turing Award winner, professor at Carnegie-Mellon University and Padma Bhushan recipient
- Rajkumar Bharathi, classical singer and music composer
- Rangaswamy Narasimhan, cognitive scientist who developed TIFRAC, the first indigenous Indian computer, Padma Shri winner
- Ravi Ruia, vice chairperson & co-founder of Essar Group
- S. Somasegar, former senior vice president, Microsoft
- Srinivasaraghavan Venkataraghavan, former cricket captain and ICC Elite Umpires Panel member
- Upendra J. Chivukula, former New Jersey General Assembly member
- V. M. Muralidharan, chairman, Ethiraj College for Women
- J. Sai Deepak, lawyer in the Supreme Court of India
- V. S. Mahalingam, DRDO scientist and director of the Centre for Artificial Intelligence and Robotics
- Venu Srinivasan, chairman of Sundaram - Clayton Limited and TVS Motor Company
- Verghese Kurien, architect of Operation Flood and India's White Revolution and recipient of the Padma Vibhushan, Ramon Magsaysay Award and the World Food Prize
- M. Madan Babu FRSC, director at St. Jude Children's Research Hospital
- Sundaram Karivardhan, industrialist and motorsport pioneer
- A. G. Ramakrishnan, professor, Indian Institute of Science
- Mahesh Muthuswami, Cinema tog 2012

== See also ==
- List of Colleges & Institutions affiliated to Anna University
- Excel Group Institutions
