= List of educational institutions in Tirunelveli district =

Tirunelveli ranks high for the number of educational institutions in districts of Tamil Nadu. The following is the list of educational institutions in the district.

== Universities ==
University	Location	Year of founding	Enrolled students	Courses Offered
Manonmaniam Sundaranar University	Abishekapatti, Tirunelveli	1990		
Anna University Chennai Regional Office, Tirunelveli	Palayamkottai, Tirunelveli	2007		
Joy University	Vadakangulam, Tirunelveli	2022		School of Computational Intelligence School of Agricultural Sciences School of Design School of Entrepreneurship & Management School of Law School of Nursing School of Pharmacy School of Life & Health Sciences School of Arts & Natural Sciences School of Engineering

== Arts & Science Colleges ==
College Name	Location	Year of founding	Enrolled students	Courses Offered
Sri Ram Nallamani College of Arts and Science	Kodikurchi			
J.P. College	Ayikudi			
Tirunelveli Dakshina Mara Nadar Sangam College	Kallikulam	1965		
Rani Anna Government College	Tirunelveli			
Mano College	Cheranmaga Devi			
M.D.T.Hindu College	Pettai			
Govt.College	Surandai			
Sarah Tucker College	Palayamkottai	1895		
St John's College	Palayamkottai	1844		
St Xavier's College (Autonomous)	Palayamkottai	1923		
Sadakathullah Appa College	Palayamkottai	1971		
C.S.I. Jayaraj Annapackiam College	Nallur	1997		
Sri Sarada College for Women	Tirunelveli	1986		

== Law Colleges ==
College Name	Location	Year of founding	Enrolled students	Courses Offered
Government Law College	Palayamkottai			

== B.ed Colleges ==
College Name	Location	Year of founding	Enrolled students	Courses Offered
St. Ignatius College of Education	Palayamkottai	1957		

== Community Colleges ==
College Name	Location	Year of founding	Enrolled students	Courses Offered
Mass Community College	Tirunelveli Main Road Near River Bridge (Vaikkal Palam) Tenkasi- 627811 04633 224444 96774 78747 99944 77758	2012	40–50	Bachelor in Applied Hospital Management Bachelor in Applied Medical Laboratory Technology Bachelor Program of Hospital Related Course (3 years)

== Medical colleges ==
College	Location	Year of Founding	Enrolled students	Courses Offered
Tirunelveli Medical College	Palayamkottai	1965		MBBS, MD
Government Siddha Medical College	Palayamkottai	1964	160	BSMS, MD

== Para-Medical Colleges (Tenkasi & Ambasamudram) ==
College Name Location	2 Years Diploma Courses 10th Pass and Above	3 Years Bachelor Program 12th Pass and above
Tenkasi Mass Community & Para-Medical College Tirunelveli Main Road Near River Bridge (Ambai Tirunelveli Roundana Junction) Ambasamudram Indian Medical Association Building College Road Near Merit School Ph:04633 224444 967 747 8 747 www.massgroups.co.in Devendrar College of Physiotherapy	Hospital Management Laboratory Technician ECG X-Ray Scan Operation Theatre & Ophthalmic Technician and All Nursing and Hospital & Laborataory Related Courses	Bachelor in Applied Hospital Management Medical Laboratory Technology Bachelor Program of Hospital Related Course Bachelor Degree in Physiotherapy

== Distance Education Institution ==
College Name	Location	Year of founding	Enrolled students	Courses Offered
Mass Community & Para-Medical College & Mass Group of Institutions	Tenkasi & Ambassamudram 967 747 8 747 www.massgroups.co.in	2012	40–50	All UG-PG & Diploma Courses Recognized by Tamil University Tanjore

== Computer Education Institutions ==
College Name	Location	Year of founding	Enrolled students	Courses Offered
Mass Groups of Institutions	Tirunelveli Main Road- Azath Nagar Junction- Tenkasi-627811 04633 224444 967 747 8 747 ww.massgroups.co.in	2012	40–50	All Computer Education

== Engineering Colleges ==
College Name	Location	Year of Founding	Enrolled Students	Courses Offered
PET Engineering College	Vallioor	2000	1,100	B.E, M.E, MBA, MCA
Nellai College of Engineering	Maruthakulam	2000	1,100	B.E, M.E
VV College Of Engineering	Thisayanvilai	2010	1100	B.E, M.E
Government College of Engineering, Tirunelveli	Tirunelveli	1981		Both UG and Masters in the following discipline: Civil, Mechanical, Electrical, Electronics and Communication and Computer Science
