= Renaming of public places in Tamil Nadu (2020) =

Tamil Nadu's Tamil Official Language and Tamil Culture Minister K Pandiarajan have announced that the anglicised names of around 3,000 places in the State would be changed into Tamil. The names of places in Tamil will be transliterated into English. The renaming of places has come into effect by a G.O. passed by Govt. of Tamil Nadu. The order follows an announcement in the assembly two years ago that anglicised names of the areas be changed closer to their original names in Tamil.

== History ==
The renaming of cities in India started in 1947 following the end of the British imperial period. The most notable are Indian English spelling-changes of Orissa to Odisha (March 2011) and the Union Territory of Pondicherry (which includes the City of Pondicherry) to Puducherry.

== Lists by District ==
=== Chennai ===
Names in English	Proposed by District Collectors	Proposed by the Committee
Tondiyarpet (Part 1)	Tandaiyaarpettai (Part 1)	Thandaiyaarpettai
Tondiyarpet (Part 2)	Tandaiyaarpettai (Part 2)	Thandaiyaarpettai
Tondiyarpet (Part 3)	Tandaiyaarpettai (Part 3)	Thandaiyaarpettai
Tondiyarpet (Part 4)	Tandaiyaarpettai (Part 4)	Thandaiyaarpettai
Purasawalkam (Part 1)	Purasaiwakkam (Part 1)	Purasaivaakkam
Purasawalkam (Part 2)	Purasaiwakkam (Part 2)	Purasaivaakkam
Vepery	Veppery	Vepperi
V.O.C. Nagar	Va.Vu.C. Nagar	Va. Oo. Si. Nagar
Perambur (Part 1)	Peramboor (Part 1)	No Change
Perambur (Part 2)	Peramboor (Part 2)	No Change
Perambur (Part 3)	Peramboor (Part 3)	No Change
Selavoyal	Selavaayal	No Change
Kodungaiyur	Kodungaiyur	Kodungaiyoor
Erukkencheri	Erukkenchery	Erukkanjery
Peravallur	Peravalloor	No Change
Siruvallur	Siruvalloor	No Change
Ayanavaram (Part 1)	Ayanpuram (Part 1)	No Change
Ayanavaram (Part 2)	Ayanpuram (Part 2)	No Change
Konnur	Konnoor	No Change
Mallikaicheri	Malligaichery	Mallikaichcheri
Aminjikarai	Amaindhakarai	No Change
Periyakudal	Periyakoodal	No Change
Chinnakudal	Chinnakoodal	No Change
Koyembedu	Koyambedu	No Change
Sencheri	Senchery	Senjeri
Egmore (Part 1)	Ezhumboor (Part 1)	No Change
Egmore (Part 2)	Ezhumboor (Part 2)	No Change
Chintadripet	Chintadaripettai	Chinthadhari- Pettai
Triplicane (Part 1)	Thiruvallikkeni (Part 1)	No Change
Triplicane (Part 2)	Thiruvallikkeni (Part 2)	No Change
Mylapore (Part 1)	Mayilappoor	Mayilaappoor
Mylapore (Part 2)	Mayilappoor	Mayilaappoor
Pallipattu	Pallippattu	No Change
Kalikundram	Kalikkundram	No Change
Urur	Ooroor	No Change
Thiruvanmiyur	Thiruvanmiyoor	No Change
Mambalam	Maambalam	No Change
Saidapet	Saidapettai	Saithaappettai
Ekkattuthangal	Ekkattutthangal	Eekkattuththaangal
Alandur	Aalandhoor	No Change
Adayar (Part 1)	Adaiyaaru (Part 1)	No Change
Government Farm	Arasuppannai	No Change
Adayar (Part 2)	Adaiyaaru (Part 2)	No Change
Guindy Park	Guindy Poonga	Gindi Poongaa
Thiyagaraya Nagar	Thiyaagaraaya Nagar	No Change
Madipakkam	Madippaakkam	Madippakkam
Jaladampet	Jalladiyaanpettai	No Change
Pallikaranai	Pallikkaranai	No Change
Palavakkam	Paalavaakkam	No Change
Okkiam Thorapakkam	Okkiyam Thuraipakkam	No Change
Enjambakkam	Eenjambaakkam	No Change
Karapakkam	Kaarappaakkam	Kaarappakkam
Sholinganallur	Chozhinganallur	Solinganalloor
Uthandi	Utthandi	Uththandi
Semmanjeri	Semmanchery	Semmanjeri
Madanandapuram	Madhanandhapuram	Madhanandapuram
Mugalivakkam	Mugalivaakkam	No Change
Manappakkam	Manappaakkam	Manappaakkam
Nandambakkam	Nandhambaakkam	Nandambaakkam
Alandur	Aalandhoor (Nagaram)	No Change
Adambakkam	Aadambaakkam (Aalandhoor Nagaram)	Aadhambaakkam (Aalandhoor Nagaram)
Pazhavanthangal	Pazhavanthaangal (Aalandhoor Nagaram)	No Change
Nanganallur	Nangainallur (Aalandhoor Nagaram)	No Change
Thalakanancheri	Thalakkanaanchery	Thalakkanaanjeri
Meenambakkam	Meenambaakkam	No Change
Maduravoyal	Madhuravaayal	No Change
Valasaravalkam	Valasaravaakkam	No Change
Porur	Poroor	No Change
Nolambur	Nolamboor	No Change
Karampakkam	Kaarambakkam	No Change
Nerkundram	Nerkundram	No Change
Ramapuram	Raamapuram	No Change
Menambedu	Menaambedu	No Change
Patravakkam	Pattaravaakkam	No Change
Ambattur	Ambatthoor	Ambaththoor
Attipattu	Atthippattu	No Change
Mannurpet	Mannoorpettai	No Change
Korattur	Korattoor	No Change
Kakkapallam	Kakkappallam	Kakkaappallam
Mogapair	Mugapperu	No Change
Surapet	Soorappattu	No Change
Puthagaram	Putthagaram	Puththagaram
Madhavaram	Maadhavaram	No Change
Vadaperumbakkam	Vadaperumbaakkam	Vadaperumbaakkam
Villakupattu	Vilakkuppaattu	Vilakkuppattu
Mathur	Maatthoor	Maaththoor
Manchambakkam	Manjambaakkam	No Change
Kosapur	Kosappoor	No Change
Ariyalur	Ariyaloor	No Change
Elandanchery	Elandhanchery	Elandhanjery
Kadapakkam	Kadappakkam	No Change
Sadayankuppam	Sadaiyankuppam	Sadaiyanguppam
Kathivakkam	Kaththivaakkam	No Change
Thiruvottriyur	Thiruvotriyur –Firka	Thiruvotriyoor – Firka
Sathangadu	Saaththangaadu	Saaththangaadu
Edayanchavadi	Idaiyanchavadi	Idaiyanchaavadi

=== Cuddalore ===
Names in English	Proposed by District Collectors	Proposed by the Committee
Katthazhai	Katthazhai	Katthaazhai
Valaiyamadevi (Kilpadi)	Valaiyamadevi (Keezhpathi)	Valaiyammadevi (Keezh Paathi)
Viramudaiyanattam	Veeramudaiyanattam	Veeramudaiyanattham
Anaivari	Anaivaari	Aanaivaari
Settiya (Shatia)Tope	Setthiyathoppu	No Change
Vattarayantettu	Vattharayan Tetthu	No Change
Kilavadinattam	Kilavadinattham	No Change
Alisikudi	Azhicikudi	No Change
Siyappadi	Seeyappadi	No Change
Uluttur	Ulutthur	No Change
Talaikkulam (Ten)	Talaikkulam (Then)	Thalaikkulam (Therkku)
Nattamedu	Natthamedu	No Change
Krishnapuram (Ten)	Krishnapuram (Therkku)	No Change
Adivarahanattam	Athivaraganattham	Aathivaraganattham
Sattappadi	Satthappadi	No Change
Kil Manakkudi	Keezh Manakkudi	No Change
Adivarahanallur (Bhuvanagiri)	Athivaraganallur (Bhuvanagiri)	Athivaraganaloor (Bhuvanagiri)
Manjakkuli	Manjakkuzhi	No Change
Arumulidevan (Bhuvanagiri)	Arumuzhidevan (Bhuvanagiri)	Arumuzhithevan (Bhuvanagiri)
Palvattunnan	Palvatthunnan	Paalvatthunnaan
Parangipettai	Parangippettai	No Change
Budangudi	Boothankudi	Boothangkudi
Sattamangalam	Satthamangalam	No Change
Valaikkulam	Vaazhaikkulam	No Change
Kulappadi	Koolappadi	No Change
Terkuvirutangan	Terkku Viruthangan	No Change
Vakkur	Vaakkur	Vaakoor
Paradur	Parathur	Parathoor
Orattur	Oratthur	Oratthoor
Madurantakanallur	Mathuranthakanallur	Mathurantha- Kanalloor
Puntottam	Poonthottam	No Change
Perungalur	Perungaalur	Perungaaloor
Esanai	Yesanai	Esanai
Pungudi	Poongudi	No Change
Kil Nattam	Keezh Nattham	No Change
Tadanpettai	Thathan Ppettai	No Change
Tiruppaninattam	Thiruppani Nattham	No Change
Kirappalaiyam	Keerappalaiyam	No Change
Mel Mungiladi	Mel Moongiladi	No Change
Kil Mungiladi	Keezh Moongiladi	No Change

=== Sivagangai ===
Names in English	Proposed by District Collectors	Proposed by the Committee
Sivaganga	Sivagangai	No Change
Kallurani	Kalloorani	No Change
Tamarakki	Thamaraakki	No Change
Alagappa Nagar	Alagappa Puram	No Change
Kutturavuppatti	Kootturavupatti	No Change
Melapunkudi	Melappoongudi	No Change
Kallarathtinippatti	Kallarathinippatti	No Change
Tirumalai	Thirumalai	No Change
Alavakottai	Alavaakkottai	No Change
Madagupatti	Madhagupatti	Mathakupatti
Kilakottai	Keezhakkottai	No Change
Kattappattu	Kaththappattu	No Change
Kottapatti	Kottaapatti	No Change
Paganeri	Paaganeri	Paakaneri
Okkur	Okkoor	No Change
Kilapungudi	Keezhappoongudi	Keezhappoonggudi
Okkur Pudur	Okkoor Pudhoor	Okkoor Puthoor
Kilmangalam	Keezhamangalam	No Change
Surakkulam	Soorakkulam	No Change
Nalukottai	Naalukottai	No Change
Puduppatti	Pudhuppatti	Puthuppatti
Arasanur	Arasanoor	No Change
Mattur	Maaththoor	No Change
Padamattur	Padamaaththoor	No Change
Pillur	Pilloor	No Change
Panaiyur	Panaiyoor	No Change
Melvaniyangudi	Mela Vaaniyangudi	Mela Vaaniyanggudi
Alangulam	Aalangulam	Aalanggulam
Kadambankulam	Kadambangulam	No Change
Kilakandani	Keezhakkandani	No Change
Sundaranapu	Sundharanadappu	Suntharanadappu
Mangudi	Maangudi	Maanggudi
Valudani	Vazhudhani	Vazhuthani
Idaikkattur	Idaikkattoor	Idaikkaattoor
Kotagudi	Kottakudi	No Change
Paiyur Pillaivayal	Paiyoor Pillaivayal	No Change
Vembagudi	Vembangudi	No Change
Ilupakudi	Iluppakkudi	No Change
Karunkalakudi	Karungkalakkudi	No Change
Arasanimuthupatti	Arasanimuththup- Patti	No Change
Alagichipatti	Azhagichchippatti	No Change

=== Dharmapuri ===
Names in English	Proposed by District Collectors	Proposed by the Committee
Dharmapuri	Dharumapuri	Tharumapuri
Virupakshipuram	Viruppatchipuram	Viruppaatchipuram
Kadagattur	Katakaththur	Katakathoor
Hale Dharmapuri	Pazhaya Tharumapuri	Hale Tharumapuri
A. Reddihalli	A. Reddippaatti	A. Reddi Halli
K.Naduhalli	K.Naduppatti	K.Nadu Halli
Adagappadi	Athakappadi	Athakappaadi
Papinayakanahalli	Pappinayakkan Patti	Paappinayakkan Patti
Annasagaram	Annasakaram	Annasaakaram
Unguranahalli	Ungkaran Patti	Unguranahalli
Mukkalanaickenahalli	Mukkalnayakkanpatti	Mukkalnayakkanahalli
Mitta Noolahall	Mitta Noola Alli	Mitta Noola Halli
Settikarai	Settikkarai	No Change
Nallanahalli	Nallan Patti	Nallana Halli
Krishnapuram	Krittinaapuram	Krishnapuram
Puludikarai	Puluthikkarai	No Change
Andhihalli	Aandippati	Aandhi Halli
Konanginayakkan Ahalli	Konaginayakkan Patti	No Change
Akkamanahalli	Akkamanappatti	Akkamana Halli
Nayakkan Ahalli	Nayakkan Patti	Naayakkana Halli
Mookkanur	Mookkanoor	No Change
Thippireddihalli	Thippireddip- Patti	Thippireddi Halli
Kondaharahalli	Kondakarap- Patti	Kondahara Halli
Veppilaimuthampatty	Veppilai- Muthampatti	No Change
Koduhalli	Koduppatti	Koduppatti
Laligam	Elaligam	Lalikam
Mademangalam	Maathevi- Mangalam	Maatheman- Galam
Budanahalli	Poothana Patti	Poothana Halli
A.Jettihalli	A.Jettipatti	A.Jetti Halli
Tadangam	Thadangam	No Change
Adiyamankottai	Athiyaman- Kottai	No Change
Mittareddihalli	Mittareddip- Patti	Mittaareddi Halli
Mittathinnahalli	Mittathinna- Patti	Mittaa Thinna Halli
Pagalahalli	Pakalpatti	Paakala Patti
Bolanahallipalayam	Bolanappattipalayam	Bolanappattipalayam
Maniyathahalli	Maaniyathaalli	Maaniyatha Halli
Thoppurkanigarahalli	Thoppurkani Karan Alli	Thoppoorkani-Kaara Halli
Nathathahalli	Naththap Patti	Naththa Halli
Dalavoyhalli	Thalavaaippatti	Thalavaai Halli

=== Tiruvallur ===
Names in English	Proposed by District Collectors	Proposed by the Committee
Poonamallee	Poovirundhavalli	Poovirunthavalli
Pallavedu	Palavedu	Paalavedu
Pammadukulam	Pammadhukulam	Pammathukulam
Pothur	Pothoor	No Change
Thirumulaivoyal (1&2)	Thirumullaivayal (1&2)	Thirumullaivaayal (1&2)
Koilpathakai (1&2)	Koilpadhagai (1&2)	Koilpathaagai (1&2)
Thiruninravur (A&B)	Thiruninravoor (A&B)	No Change
Akraharam Mel	Aghraharamel	Akrahaaramel
Vilinjayambakkam	Vilinjiyambakkam	Vilinjiyampaakkam
Ayyappakkam	Ayappakkam	Ayappaakkam
Egumadurai	Egumadhurai	Ekumathurai
Sanaputhur	Sanaputhoor	Saanaputhoor
Edur	Eadoor	No Change
Eguvarpalayam (1&2)	Eeguvarpalaiyam (1&2)	Eekuvarpaalaiyam (1&2)
Maanallur	Maanelloor	No Change
Pondavakkam	Pondhavakkam	Ponthavaakkam
Chedulpakkam	Sedhilpakkam	Sethilpaakkam
Madarpakkam	Madharpakkam	Maatharpaakkam
Vaniamalli	Vaniyamalli	No Change
Sithurnatham	Chithurnatham	Chithoor Nattham
Amirthamangalam	Amirdhamangalam	Amirthamangalam
Periapuliyur	Periyapuliyur	Periyapuliyoor
Budur	Budoor	No Change
Dharkasthukandigai	Dhargasthukandigai	Dharkasthukandigai
Thervoykandigai	Thervaikandigai	Thervaaikandigai
Madavaram	Madhavaram	Maathavaram
Nelvoy	Nelvai	Nelvaai
Kollanur	Kollanoor	Kollaanoor
Erukkuvoy	Erukkuvai	Erukkuvaai
Venkuli	Venkuzhi	No Change
Palesewaram	Paalesewaram	Paa.Aleswaram
Annapanaicken-Kuppam	Annapanayakan-Kuppam	Annappanayakkan-Kuppam
Pudupalayam	Pudhupalaiyam	Puthupaalaiyam
Chintalakuppam	Chinthalakuppam	Chinthalakkuppam
Medipalayam	Medhipalayam	Methippalayam
Obasamudrum	Obasamuthirum	No Change
Melakkalani	Melakkazhani	No Change
Thurapallam	Thurappallam	No Change
Peddikuppam	Pedhikuppam	Pethikkuppam
Athupakkam	Aathuppakkam	Aathuppaakkam
Valuthalambedu	Vazhathalambedu	No Change

=== Pudukottai ===
Names in English	Proposed by District Collectors	Proposed by the Committee
Ammachathiram	Ammachatthiram	No Change
Kothamangalappatti	Kotthamangalappatti	No Change
Kothamangalappatti Vadakku	Kotthamangalappatti Vadakku	No Change
Ariyur	Aariyur	Aariyoor
Puthuvayal	Pudhuvayal	Puthuvayal
Athi Coloney	Aadhi Kudiyiruppu	Aathi Kudiyiruppu
Chokkampatty	Sokkampatti	No Change
Alathur	Aalatthoor	No Change
Ambalakarantheru	Ambalakaratheru	Ambalakkaratheru
Chinnakovattuppatti	Chinnakuvaattupatti	Chinnaakuvaattupatti
Pothayampatti	Potthayampatti	No Change
Vellankadu	Vealangkadu	No Change
Kurupartheru	Kurumpattheru	No Change
Kalampatti	Kallampatti	No Change
Koothinipatti	Kootthinipatti	No Change
Paravattivayal	Paravettivayal	No Change
Puthuppatti	Pudhuppatti	Puthuppatti
Sathampatti	Saatthampatti	No Change
Othakadai	Otthakadai	No Change
Kilakalam	Kizhakalam	No Change
Kuppathupatti	Kuppatthupatti	No Change
Pathikaranpannai	Pasikaranpannai	Paasikaaranpannai
Servarkalam	Seruvarkalam	Seruvaarkalam
Thithanpannai	Thitthanpannai	Thitthaanpannai
Kovindannaayakkanpatti	Govindhannayak- Kanpatti	Govinthannayakkan Patti
Keelaennai	Keezhaennai	No Change
Sanakovil	Seanakovil	Seanaakovil
Achanayakkanpatty	Aachanayakkanpatti	No Change
Alikadu	Aalikadu	No Change
Edayaartheru	Edayartheru	No Change
Nevaipatty	Neivaipatti	No Change
Soraiyampatty	Soriyampatti	No Change
Kudalur	Koodaloor	No Change
Keelapaluvanji	Keezhappaluvanji	No Change
Kunnakudippatti	Kunnakkudippatti	No Change
Senthamangalam	Seanthamangalam	No Change
Kayampatty	Kaayampatti	No Change
Keelakkurichi	Keezhakkurichi	No Change
Ichankudi	Ichangudi	No Change
Keelakothirapatti	Keezhakotthirappatti	No Change

=== Krishnagiri ===
Names in English	Proposed by District Collectors	Proposed by the Committee
Batimadugu	Pathimadugu	Pathimaduku
Idippalle	Idipalli	Idippalli
Oddapalle	Ottapalli	Ottappalli
Balanapalle	Baalanapalli	Balanappalli
Krishnappanayani-Podur	Krishnappanaayakan-Podoor	Krishnappanaayakkan-Podoor
Hale-Krishnapuram	Hale Krishnaapuram	No Change
Halekundani	Halekunthaani	No Change
Tirtam	Theertham	No Change
Karisagaramtalav	Kariasaagaramthalaav	No Change
Nallur	Nalloor	No Change
Nimmalavadi	Nimmalvaadi	No Change
Devarakundani	Thevarkunthaani	No Change
Tankadikuppam	Thangadikuppam	Thangaadikuppam
Ettipallitalav	Ettipallithalaav	Ettippallithalaav
Ettipalle	Ettipalli	Ettippalli
Ragimakanapalli	Ragimaaganapalli	Ragimaaganappalli
Chigaralapalli	Sigaralapalli	Sigaralappalli
Siranapalli	Seeranapalli	Seeranappalli
Manavaranapalli	Manavaaranapalli	Manavaaranappalli
Gangamadugu	Kangamadugu	Kangamaduku
Ebbari	Yepperi	Eppeeri
Konganeppalli	Konganapalli	No Change
Sigaramaganapalli	Sigaramaagaanapalli	No Change
Doddakanama	Thottagaanamaa	Thottakaanamaa
Undiganatham	Undikaanaththam	No Change
Budimutlu	Boothimutlu	No Change
Nachikuppam	Naachikuppam	Naachikkuppam
Kattiripalli	Kaththiripalli	Kaththiiripalli
Ederepalli	Edayarapalli	Edayarappalli
Avalanatham	Aavalnaththam	Aavalnaththam
Virupasandiram	Viruppasanthiram	No Change
Kondappanaayakkanapalli	Kondappanaayakkanapalli	No Change
Chinnakottur	Chinnakoththoor	No Change
Naduvanapalli	Naaduvanapalli	No Change
Talippalle	Thalipalli	No Change
Bommarasanapalle	Bommarasanapalli	No Change
Tatatara	Thadathaarai	No Change
Madepalli	Maathepalli	Maatheppalli
Sulamalai	Soolamalai	No Change
Ponnappagayunipalli	Ponnappakavunipalli	No Change

=== Tiruppur ===
Names in English	Proposed by District Collectors	Proposed by the Committee
Ponku Palayam	Pongu Palayam	Pongu Paalayam
North Avinasipalayam	Vadakku Avinasi Palayam	Vadakku Avinasi Paalayam
South Avinasipalayam	Therku Avinasi Palayam	Therku Avinasi Paalayam
Pudupalayam-N	Pudhuppalayam Vadakku	Puthuppaalayam Vadakku
Pudupalayam-S	Pudhuppalayam Therku	Therku Puthuppaalayam
Pazhamgarai	Pazhangarai	No Change
Merkupathy	Merkkuppathi	No Change
Vattalapathy	Vattalappathi	No Change
Chinnakoundanvalasu	Chinne Kavundan Valasu	No Change
Nallikavundan Palayam	Nallikavundam Palayam	Nallikavundam Paalayam
M.Pallagoundenpalayam	Mukaasi Pallakavundam Palayam	Mukaasi Pallakkavundam Paalayam
A.Pallagoundenpalayam	Attavanai Pallakavundam Palayam	Attavanai Pallakavundam Paalayam
Nadupatty	Naduppatti	No Change
S.Kangayampalayam	Then Mugam Kangayampalayam	Then Mugam Kaangayam Paalayam
N.Kangayampalayam	Vada Mugam Kangayam Palayam	Vada Mugam Kaangayam Paalayam
Panickampatty	Panikkampatti	No Change
Sitrambalam	Chithambalam	No Change
Annupatty	Anuppatti	No Change
A.Vadamalaipalyam	Ve.Vadamalai Palayam	Ve.Vadamalai Paalayam
V. Kallipalayam	Ve. Kallippalayam	No Change
Chitaravithanpalayam	Chithravuthanpalayam	Chithraavuthanpaalayam
Dharapuram North	Dharapuram Vadakku	Tharaapuram Vadakku
Kozhichivadi	Kolinchivadi	Kolinchivaadi
Tharapuram South	Dharapuram Therkku	Tharaapuram Therku
Utthappalayam	Oothup Palayam	Oothup Paalayam
Manakkadvu	Manakkadavu	No Change
Kongur	Kongoor	No Change
Pommanallur	Bommanalloor	No Change
Dhurampadi	Thoorambadi	No Change
Moolanur	Moolanoor	No Change
Senathipathypalayam	Senapathi Palayam	Senapathi Paalayam
Velamboondi	Velam Poondi	Velaam Poondi
Edakalpady	Edakkalpadi	Edakkalpaadi
Ericinampalayam	Erasinampalayam	Erasinampaalayam
Kannankovil	Kannangkovil	Kannaangkovil
Kolumanguli	Kozhumanguli	Kozhumangguli
Chirukinar	Sirukinar	No Change
Bonganduri	Punganthurai	No Change
Mampadi	Mambadi	Maambadi
Kangeyam	Kangayam	Kaangayam

=== Tuticorin ===
Names in English	Proposed by District Collectors	Proposed by the Committee
Tuticorin	Thoothukkudi	Thooththukkudi
Srivaikundam	Thiruvaikundam	No Change
Aandal Patchery	Aandal Pacchery	No Change
Mahilam Puram	Mahizham Puram	No Change
K.Sawyer Puram	K. Sawyar Puram	No Change
Keela Thattaparai	Keezha Thattapparai	No Change
Keela Kootudankadu	Keezha Kootudankadu	No Change
Keela Alagapuri	Keezha Azhagapuri	Keezha Azhagaapuri
Mela Alagapuri	Mela Azhagapuri	Mela Azhagaapuri
Vannarapettai	Vannar Pettai	No Change
Silon Colony	Ceylon Kudiyiruppu	No Change
Kilpidagai Appan Kovil	Keezh Pidagai Appan Kovil	No Change
New Muniasamy Puram	Pudhiya Muniasamy Puram	Pudhiya Muniasaamy Puram
Kuravar Colony	Kuravar Kudiyiruppu	No Change
Meenavar Colony	Meenavar Kudiyiruppu	No Change
Aligudi	Azhigudi	Aazhigudi
Meyakan Palli	Meeyakan Palli	Meeyaakaan Palli
Keela Thoothukuli	Keezha Thoothukuzhi	No Change
Mela Thoothukuli	Mela Thoothukuzhi	No Change
Alagapuri	Azhagapuri	Azhagaapuri
Keela Sekkarakudi	Keezha Sekkarakkudi	Keezha Sekkaarakkudi
Keela Seriyandur	Keezha Seriyanthur	Keezha Seriyanthoor
V.Atichanallur	V.Athichanallur	V.Athichanalloor
Kilakku	Kilakku	Kizhakku
Alagappapuram	Azhagappapuram	Azhagappapuram
Kannativillai	Kannandivillai	Kannaandi Villai
Keelavoor	Keezhavoor	No Change
Kela Allwarthoppu	Keezha Allwarthoppu	Keezha Aazhwarthoppu
Puthiya Patcheri	Puthiya Paccheri	No Change
Keela Karungadal	Keezha Karungadal	No Change
Keela Panaikulam	Keezha Panaikkulam	No Change
Keela Colony	Keezha Kudiyiruppu	No Change
Narayan Colony	Narayan Kudiyiruppu	No Change
Sampadi Adi Colony	Sampadi Adi Kudiyiruppu	Sampadi Aadi Kudiyiruppu
Pungan Colony	Pungan Kudiyiruppu	No Change
Arunthathiyar Colony	Arunthathiyar Kudiyiruppu	No Change
Mottaimadan Colony	Mottaimadan Kudiyiruppu	Mottaimaadan Kudiyiruppu
Vembadi Colony	Vembadi Kudiyiruppu	No Change
Palaya Kayal	Pazhaya Kayal	Pazhaya Kaayal
Parumbu Colony	Parumbu Kudiyiruppu	No Change
Kaniyan Colony	Kaniyan Kudiyiruppu	No Change

=== Perambalur ===
Names in English	Proposed by District Collectors	Proposed by the Committee
Ammapalayam	Ammaapaalayam	No Change
A. Kudikkadu	A. Kudikkaadu	No Change
Alambadi	Aalambaadi	No Change
Sokkanathapuram	Sokkanaathapuram	No Change
Alangili	Alangizhi	No Change
Papangarai	Paapaangarai	Paapanggarai
Anna Nagar	Annaa Nagar	No Change
Anjugam Colony	Anjugam Kudiyiruppu	No Change
Indhira Nagar	Indhiraa Nagar	No Change
Mahathama Gandhi Nagar	Mahaathmaa Gandhi Nagar	No Change
Neduvasal	Neduvaasal	No Change
Kavulpalayam	Kavulpaalayam	No Change
Pudhuathur	Pudhuaathur	No Change
Ladapuram	Laadapuram	No Change
Navalur	Naavalur	Naavaloor
Selliyampalayam	Selliyampaalayam	No Change
Sathanur	Saathanur	Saathanoor
Vellanur	Vellanoor	No Change
Siruvachur	Siruvaachur	Siruvaachoor
Palambadi	Paalaambaadi	No Change
Iraddaimalaisandhu	Irattaimalaisanthu	No Change
Somandapudhur	Somandaapudhur	Somandaaputhoor
Manakkadu	Manakkaadu	No Change
Keelakanavai	Keezhakanavaai	No Change
Renganathapuram	Renganaathapuram	No Change
Thambiranpatti	Thambiraanpatti	No Change
Eechenkadu	Eechankaadu	No Change
Keelakarai	Keezhakkarai	No Change
Vadakumadavi	Vadakkumaathavi	No Change
Koneripalayam	Konerippaalayam	No Change
Aranarai	Aranaarai	No Change
Melapuliyur	Melappuliyur	Melappuliyoor
Kudikadu	Kudikkaadu	No Change
Pathangi	Paathaangi	No Change
Jayanthi Colony	Jeyanthi Kudiyiruppu	No Change
Velluvadi	Velluvaadi	No Change
Kariyanur	Kaariyaanur	No Change
Kavundarpalayam	Kavundarpaalayam	No Change
Vettuvalmedu	Vettuvaalmedu	No Change
Sasthiripuram	Saasthiripuram	No Change

=== Kancheepuram ===
Names in English	Proposed by District Collectors	Proposed by the Committee
Chengalpet	Chengalpattu	No Change
Urapakkam	Oorappakkam	No Change
Nedugundram	Nedungundram	No Change
Unamancheri	Oonamancheri	Oonamanjeri
Kumili	Kumizhi	No Change
Hasthinapuram	Athinapuram	Athinaapuram
Appur	Aappoor	No Change
Athur	Aathoor	No Change
Thirukatchur	Thirukkachoor	No Change
Panagottur	Panangottoor	No Change
Virapuram	Veerapuram	No Change
Paranur	Paranoor	No Change
Kandalur	Kaanthaloor	No Change
Keelakkaranai	Keezhakkaranai	No Change
Gudalur	Koodaloor	No Change
Palaveli	Pazhaveli	No Change
Ozhalur	Ozhaloor	No Change
Hanumanthaputheri	Anumanthaputheri	No Change
Hanumanthai	Anumanthai	No Change
Kilmaruvathur	Keezh Maruvathoor	No Change
Maluvankaranai	Mazhuvankaranai	No Change
Gurumbirai	Kurumbarai	No Change
Ayakunnam	Aayakkunnam	No Change
Vayalur	Vaayaloor	No Change
Attupattukottai	Aattupattukottai	No Change
Isur	Eesoor	No Change
Andarakuppam	Aandarkuppam	No Change
Chunampet	Choonampedu	No Change
Vilangadu	Vilaankadu	Vilaankaadu
Thiruvadavur	Thiruvathavoor	No Change
Uludamangalam	Uzhuthamangalam	No Change
Sivadi	Seevadi	Seevaadi
Kilarkollai	Keezhar Kollai	No Change
Pavunjur	Pavunchoor	Pavunjoor
Atchivilagam	Aatchivilagam	Aatchivilaagam
Sevur	Sevoor	No Change
Damal	Thaamal	No Change
Kilar	Kilaar	No Change
Kuram	Kooram	No Change

=== Coimbatore ===
Names in English	Proposed by District Collectors	Proposed by the Committee
Coimbatore	Koyamputhur	Koyampuththoor
Naicken Palayam	Nayakkanpalayam	Nayakkanpaalayam
Gudalur	Gudaloor	Koodaloor
Perianaicken Palayam	Periyanayakkan Palayam	Periyanayakkan Paalayam
Narasimhanaicken Palayam	Narasimma Nayakkan Palayam	Narasimma Nayakkan Paalayam
Chinna Thadagam	Sinna Thadaagam	Chinna Thadaagam
Telugupalayam	Thelungupalayam	Thelungupaalayam
Sanganur	Sanganoor	No Change
Thudiyalur	Thudiyaloor	No Change
Chinnavadampatti	Sinna Vaadampatti	No Change
Vilankurichi	Vilaankurichi	No Change
Kalapatti	Kaalapatti	No Change
Souripalayam	Sowripalayam	Sowripaalayam
Mavuthampatti	Maavuthampathi	No Change
Pichanur	Pichanoor	No Change
Madukkarai	Madhukkarai	No Change
Palathorai Bit-1	Paalathurai	No Change
Valukkuparai	Vazhukkupparai	Vazhukkuppaarai
Vellalore	Vellaloor	No Change
Chettipalayam	Settipalayam	Settipaalayam
Sokkanur	Sokkanoor	No Change
Muthur	Muthoor	No Change
Sulakkal	Soolakkal	No Change
Govindapuram	Govindhapuram	Govinthapuram
Kaniyalampalayam	Kaaniyaalam Palayam	Kaaniyaalam Paalayam
Solanur	Sozhanoor	No Change
Varadanur	Varathanoor	No Change
Chettiakkapalayam	Settiyakkapalayam	Settiyakkapaalayam
Andipalayam	Aandipalayam	Aandipaalayam
Periakalandai	Periya Kalandhai	No Change
Kattampatti	Kaattampatti	No Change
Sirukkalandai Part-1	Siru Kalandhai	Sirukkalandhai
Jagir Naickenpalayam	Zagir Nayakkanpalayam	Zagar Nayakkanpaalayam
Thondamuthur	Thondamuthoor	No Change
Kalikkanaicken Palayam	Kalikkanayakkan Palayam	Kalikkanayakkan Paalayam
Thennamanallur	Thennamanalloor	No Change
Madvarayapuram	Mathvarayapuram	No Change
Alanthurai	Aalanthurai	No Change
Madampatti	Maadhampatti	No Change
Perur Chettipalayam	Peroor Settipalayam	Peroor Settipaalayam

=== Tiruvannamalai ===
Names in English	Proposed by District Collectors	Proposed by the Committee
Kattukanallur	Kaattukaanalloor	No Change
Kolathur	Kolaththoor	No Change
Vannankulam	Vannaankulam	No Change
5 Puthur	5 Puththoor	No Change
Kilnagar	Keezhnagar	No Change
Athimalaipattu	Aththimalaippattu	No Change
Poosimalaikuppam	Poosimalaikkuppam	No Change
12 Puthur	12 Puththoor	No Change
Morapanthangal	Morappanthaangal	No Change
Vettiyan Tholuvam	Vettiyaan Thozhuvam	No Change
Agrapalayam	Agraapaalayam	No Change
Ariyapadi	Ariyappaadi	No Change
Adayappalam	Adaiyapalam	No Change
Meyyur	Meyyoor	No Change
Mullandiram	Mullandiram	No Change
Kunnathur	Kunnaththoor	No Change
Palayam	Paalaiyam	Paalayam
Pungampadi	Pungampaadi	No Change
Pulavanpadi	Pulavanpaadi	No Change
Sennanandal	Sennaanandal	No Change
Arayalam	Araiyaalam	No Change
Rattinamangalam	Raattinamangalam	No Change
Vellari	Velleri	No Change
Adhanur	Adhanoor	Athanoor
Mattadhari	Mattadhaari	Mattathaari
Ranthamkoratur	Raanthamkorattoor	No Change
Panaiyur	Panaiyoor	No Change
Ogaiyur	Ogaiyoor	Okaiyoor
Agaram	Aagaaram	No Change
Paiyaur	Paiyoor	No Change
Velapadi	Velappaadi	No Change
Vadugasathu	Vadugasaaththu	No Change
Arni (East) Arni (West)	Aarani (East) Aarani (West)	Aarani (Kizhakku) Aarani (Merkku)
Meppathurai	Meppaththurai	No Change
Kilathur	Keezhaaththoor	No Change
Narthampoondi	Naarththaampoondi	No Change
C. Andapattu	C.Aandaapattu	No Change
Periyakilambadi	Periyakilaambaadi	No Change
Sirukilambadi	Sirukkaambaadi	Sirukilaambaadi
Mutharasampoondi	Muththarasam Poondi	No Change

=== Nagapattinam ===
Names in English	Proposed by District Collectors	Proposed by the Committee
Vedaranyam	Vedharanyam	VETHARANYAM
Sirkali	Seerkaazhi	No Change
Nagore	Nagoor	No Change
Koranadu	Koorainadu	Koorainaadu
Thiruvizhandhur	Thiruvizhandhoor	No Change
Thadalan Kovil	Thadalan Koil	No Change
Keelvelur	Keezhveloor	Keezveeloor
Thalanayar	Thalaignayiru	Thalaignaayiru
Thirupugalur	Thirupugaloor	Thiruppukaloor
Kongarayanallur	Kongarayanalloor	Kongaraayanalloor
Kayathur	Kayathoor	No Change
Aadhalayur	Aadhalaiyoor	Aathalaiyoor
Kottur	Kottoor	No Change
Keezhaboothanur	Keezhaboothanoor	No Change
Edayathangudi	Edaiyathangudi	Edaiyatthangudi
Aalathur	Aalathoor	No Change
Marungore	Marungoor	No Change
Kaaraiyur	Kaaraiyoor	No Change
Meelaboothanur	Melaboothanoor	No Change
Keezhathanjavur	Keezhathanjavoor	No Change
Thuraiyur	Thuraiyoor	No Change
Palaiyur	Palaiyoor	Paalaiyoor
Perungadambanore	Perungadambanoor	No Change
Elangadambanore	Elangadambanoor	No Change
Sirangudipuzhiur	Sirangudipuliyoor	No Change
Sellur	Selloor	No Change
Ivanallur	Ivanalloor	No Change
Vadakkupoikainallur	Vadakkupoigainalloor	No Change
Orathur	Orathoor	No Change
Agaraorathur	Agaraorathoor	Akaraorathoor
Puducherry	Pudhucherry	Puthucherry
Vadavur	Vadavoor	No Change
Therkuppoigainallur	Therkkupoigainalloor	No Change
Okkur	Okkoor	No Change
Agarakadambanore	Agarakadambanoor	No Change
Athipuliyur	Athipuliyoor	No Change
Kurukathi	Kurukkathi	No Change
Kilvelur	Keezhveloor	No Change
Koothur	Koothoor	No Change

=== Virudhunagar ===
Names in English	Proposed by District Collectors	Proposed by the Committee
Srivilliputtur	Thiruvillipuththur	No Change
North Srivilliputtur	North Thiruvillipuththur	Vadakku Thiruvillipuththur
Deivendri	Deivendhiri	Theivendhiri
Athikulam - Sengulam	Aththikulam - Sengulam	No Change
Pattakulam Sallipatti	Paattakulam Sallipatti	No Change
Villuppanur	Vizhuppanur	Vizhuppanoor
Poovani	Poovaani	No Change
Pillayarnatham	Pillayaarnaththam	No Change
Valaikulam	Vaazhaikkulam	No Change
Padikasuvaithan patti	Padikkaasuvaiththaan patti	No Change
Achanthavilthan	Achanthavirththaan	No Change
Ayan natchiyarkoil	Ayan Nachchiyaarkovil	No Change
Nalingaperi	Nallingaperi	No Change
Khansapuram	Khaansaapuram	No Change
Watrap	Vaththiraayiruppu	No Change
W.Puthupatti	V.Puthuppatti	Va.Puthuppatti
Maharajapuram	Mahaaraajapuram	No Change
Marikalamkathan	Marikkalamkaaththaan	No Change
Ayartharmam	Aayartharmam	No Change
Vellapottal	Vellappottal	No Change
Ruthrappanaickenpatti	Ruththirappanaayakkanpatti	No Change
Kalathur	Kalaththur	Kalathoor
Moovaraivendran	Moovaraivenraan	No Change
Nathampatti	Naththampatti	No Change
Kothankulam	Koththankulam	No Change
Arasiyarpatti	Arasiyaarpatti	No Change
Puthupalayam	Puthuppalaiyam	Puthuppaalayam
Samusigapuram	Samusigaapuram	Samusikaapuram
Malarajakularaman	Melaraajakularaaman	No Change
North Venganallur	North Vengaanallur	Vadakku Vengaanallur
Ayyankollankondan	Ayankollangondaan	No Change
Kollankondan	kollangondaan	No Change
Samthapuram	Sammanthapuram	No Change
Melapattakarisalkulam	Melappaattam karisalkulam	No Change
Sundararajapuram	Sundararaajapuram	No Change
Seithur	Seththur	Sethtoor
North Devathanam	North Devathaanam	Vadakku Tevathaanam
South Devathanam	South Devathaanam	Therkku Tevathaanam
Chokkanathanputhur	Chokkanaathanpuththur	No Change
Puthur	Puththur	Puththoor

=== Karur ===
Names in English	Proposed by District Collectors	Proposed by the Committee
Karur	Karoor	No Change
Renganathapuram North	Renganathapuram vadakku	No Change
Renganathapuram South	Renganathapuram therkku	No Change
Avuthipalayam	Aavuthipalayam	Aavuthipaalaayam
Kolanthanur	Kolanthaanoor	No Change
Kunnanur	Kunnanoor	No Change
Kilakku Mettupudhur	Kizhakku Mettupudhur	Kizhakku Mettuputhoor
Muthanur	Muthanoor	No Change
Sottaiyur	Sottaiyoor	No Change
Kuthanipalayam	Kuthaanipalayam	Kuthaanipaalayam
Maravapalayam	Maravaapalayam	Maravaapaalayam
Nadaiyanur	Nadaiyanoor	No Change
Pugalur	Pugazhoor	No Change
Nanniyur	Nanniyoor	No Change
Kiraiyur	Kiraayoor	No Change
Siviyampalayam	Siviyaampalayam	Siviyaampaalayam
Netaji Nagar	Nethaji Nagar	No Change
Nerur North part	Nerur Vadapagam	No Change
Othakadai North Part	Othakadai Vadapagam	No Change
Othaiyur	Othaiyoor	No Change
P.Kalipalayam	Pa.Kaalipalayam	Pa.Kaalipaalayam
Nagampalli	Naagampalli	No Change
Paraipatti	Paaraipatti	No Change
Malaiyur	Malaiyoor	No Change
Kothapalayam	Koththapalayam	Koththapaalayam
Keelathalaiyur	Keezhathalaiyoor	No Change
Nagalur	Naagaloor	No Change
Utharasapatti	Utharaasappatti	No Change
Kodandhur North Part	Kodandhur vadabagam	Kodanthoor vadabagam
Kaatur	Kaatoor	No Change
Kulathur	Kulathoor	No Change
Veralipatti	Viraalippatti	No Change
Paraiyur	Paaraiyoor	No Change
Kovilur	Koviloor	No Change
Jameen Athur	Zamin Aathoor	No Change
Athikaatur	Aathikaatoor	No Change
Avuthipalayam	Aavuthipalayam	Aavuthipaalayam
Palamapuram	Pazhamapuram	Pazhamaapuram
Dimmachipuram	Thimmachipuram	Thimmaachipuram
Kandiyur	Kandiyoor	No Change

=== Villupuram ===
Names in English	Proposed by District Collectors	Proposed by the Committee
Vilupuram	Viluppuram	Vizhuppuram
Ginjee	Senji	No Change
Tokavadi	Thogaippadi	Thokaippadi
Teli	Theli	No Change
Pedagam	Pidagam	Pidaagam
Chittani	Chithani	No Change
Marudur	Maruthur	Maruthoor
Tiruppachchanr	Thiruppachanur	Thiruppachanoor
Tindivanam	Thindivanam	No Change
Mailam	Mayilam	No Change
Neduntondi	Nedunthondi	No Change
Vilukkam	Vizhukkam	No Change
Tivanur	Deevanur	Theevanoor
Tengapakkam	Thengappakkam	No Change
Elay	Eazhai	No Change
Avaiyakuppam	Avvaiyarkuppam	No Change
Taluudali	Thazuthali	No Change
Vidurdam	Veedurdam	Veedur Anai
Tiruchitambalam	Thiruchitrambalam	No Change
Putturai	Puthurai	Pooththurai
Ottai	Odai	No Change
Talaiyanaikuppam	Thalaiyanikuppam	Thalaiyanaikuppam
Kuttappakkam (Kil)	Kuthappakam (Kizh)	Koothappaakkam (Kizh)
Vilvanattam	Vilvanatham	No Change
Kaluperumbakkam	Kazhupperumppakam	No Change
Koluvari	Kozhuvari	Kozhuvaari
Rayaottai	Rayaodai	Raayaodai
Rayapuduppakam	Rayapputhuppakam	Rayapputhuppaakkam
Pudukkupam	Puthukkupam	Pudhukkuppam
Avalurpet	Avalurpettai	Avaloorpettai
Chitteri	Chiteri	Chitteri
Tenpalai	Thenpalai	Thenpaalai
Kalattambattu	Kalathampatu	Kalathampattu
Sattapputtur	Sathapputhur	Saaththappuththoor
Pappantangal	Pappanthangal	Pappananthal
Puttirambattu	Puthirampattu	Puthiraampattu
Tandalai	Thandalai	No Change
Tyagarajapuram	Thiyagarajapuram	No Change
Attiyur	Athiyur	Athiyoor
Timmanandal	Thimmananthal	No Change
Chittal	Chithal	Chithaal

=== Salem ===
Names in English	Proposed by District Collectors	Proposed by the Committee
Tadanur	Thathanoor	No Change
Mukkanur	Mookkanoor	No Change
Achanguttaipatti Pudur	Aachanguttaippatty Puthoor	Aachanguttaippatti Puthoor
Kuppanur	Kuppanoor	No Change
Tailanur	Thylaanoor	No Change
Sandiyur	Santhiyoor	No Change
Maramangalattupatti	Maaramangalaththuppatty	No Change
Tirumalagiri	Thirumalagiri	No Change
Narasojipatti	Narasothippatty	No Change
Mallamuppan Patti	Mallamooppan Patty	No Change
Soudapuram	Sowthapuram	No Change
Ilampillai	Elampillai	No Change
Virapandi	Veerapandi	No Change
Silnayakkanpatti	Seelanayakkanpatty	No Change
Anaikkuttaipatti	Aanaikkuttappatty	No Change
Pettampatti	Peththampatty	No Change
Nagaiyampatti	Naagaiyaampatty	No Change
Valakkombai	Vaazhakkombai	No Change
Belur	Peloor	No Change
Kadambur	Kadamboor	No Change
Odiyattur	Odhiyaththur	Odhiyathoor
Anaiyampatti	Aanaiyaampatty	No Change
Tumbal	Thumbal	No Change
Chinnakalrayan Hills (Nor)	Sinnakkalrayan Malai (Vadakku)	No Change
Ettapur	Yeththappoor	Eethappoor
Chinnakrishnapuram	Sinnakrishnaapuram	Chinna Krishnaapuram
Puthirakavandanpalayam	Puththirakkavundanpaalayam	Puththirakavundanpaalayam
Peddanayakkanpalayam	Peththanayakkanpaalayam	No Change
Kunnur	Kunnoor	No Change
Appamma Samudram	Appamma Samuthiram	No Change
Alagapuram	Azhagapuram	No Change
Attur	Aaththoor	No Change
Veppanattam	Veppanaththam	No Change
Varagur	Varagoor	No Change
Talaivasal	Thalaivasal	No Change
Kirippatti	Keerippatty	Keerippatti
Kamakkapalayam	Kaamakkaappaalayam	No Change
Sittheri	Siththeri	No Change
Manattal	Manaththal	No Change
Bal Bakki	Pal Baakki	No Change

=== Tiruchirappalli ===
Names in English	Proposed by District Collectors	Proposed by the Committee
Trichirappalli	Thiruchirappalli	No Change
Crawford	Kirappatti	No Change
Golden Rock	Ponmalai	No Change
Uttama Seri	Utthamarseeli	No Change
Tiruttimalai	Thirutthimalai	No Change
Kuttappar	Kootthaippar	No Change
Torakkudi	Thuraikkudi	No Change
Srirangam	Thiruvarangam	No Change
Athavathur	Adhavatthoor	Athavatthoor
Alundur	Azhundhoor	No Change
Allur	Alloor	No Change
Anthanallur	Andhanalloor	Anthanalloor
Ariyavur	Ariyaavoor	No Change
Cholanganallur	Sozhanga Nalloor	No Change
Kalligudi	Kallikkudi	Kallikkudi
Kilikkudu	Kilikkoodu	No Change
Kolukkattaigudi	Kolukkattaikkudi	No Change
Kulattur	Kulatthoor	No Change
Kulumani	Kuzhumani	No Change
Kumaravayalur	Kumaaravayaloor	No Change
Malliyampattu	Malliyampatthu	No Change
Marudandakkurichi	Marudhandakkurichi	No Change
Mattur	Maatthoor	No Change
Mudikandam	Mudikanndam	No Change
Mullikkarumbur	Mullikkarumboor	Mullikkarumboor
Muttarasanallur	Muttharasanalloor	No Change
Seturapatti	Sedhuraappatti	Sethuraappatti
Tayanur	Thayanoor	No Change
Tiruchendurai	Thiruchendhurai	No Change
Tirumalaisamudram	Thirumalaisamutthiram	No Change
Tiruppiraiturai	Thirupparaaithurai	No Change
Ulkadi Ariyavur	Ulkadai Ariyavoor	No Change
Melur	Meloor	No Change
Timaraya Samudram	Thimmarayasamutthiram	No Change
Vellithirumutam	Vellithirumuttham	No Change
Jambukeswaram	Jembugeswaram	No Change
Tiruvalarsolai	Thiruvalar Solai	No Change
Kamparasampettai	Kambarasampettai	No Change
Kavalkarapaliyam	Kavalkaarapalaiyam	Kavalkaarapaalaiyam
Uyyakondan Thirumalai	Uyyakkondaan Thirumalai	No Change
Koppu (Vadaku)	Koppu (Vadakku)	No Change
Kadaiyakurichi	Kadiyakkurichi	No Change
Maykudi	Mekkudi	No Change
Kottapattu	Kottappattu	No Change
Periyanayagi Chathiram	Periyanayagisatthiram	No Change
Punganur	Punganoor	No Change
Panayapuram	Panaiyapuram	No Change
Ragavendrapuram	Ragavendhirapuram	No Change
Subramaniapuram	Subramaniyapuram	No Change
Mambalasalai	Mambazhachalai	No Change
Inam Kulathur	Inam Kulatthoor	Inaam Kulatthoor
Pettiavaytalai	Pettavaitthalai	Pettaivaaiththalai
Asur	Asoor	No Change
Cholamadevi	Sozhamadevi	No Change
Ilandaippatti	Ilanthaippatti	No Change
Kandalur	Kaandhaloor	No Change
Kilakalkandar Kottai	Keezhakkalkandar Kottai	No Change
Kilamullakkudi	Keezhamullakkudi	No Change
Kilakkurichi	Keezhakkurichi	No Change
Kiliyur	Kiliyur	Kiliyoor
Krishnasamudram	Kirushna Samutthiram	Krishna Samuththiram
Kumbagudi	Kumbagudi	Kumbagudi
Velayudangudi	Velayuthangudi	Velayuthanggudi
Kuvalagudi	Kuvalakkudi	No Change
Natarajapuram	Nadarasapuram	No Change
Palanganangudi	Pazhanganangudi	Pazhangananggudi
Panaiyakurichi	Panaiyakkurichi	No Change
Pattalapettai	Patthalappettai	Patthaalappettai
Pulangudi	Poolangudi	Poolanggudi
Suriyur	Sooriyur	No Change
Tenerippatti	Thenerippatti	No Change
Tirunedungulam	Thirunedungulam	No Change
Tiruverambur	Thiruverumboor	No Change
Tuvagudi	Thuvakkudi	No Change
Valavandankottai	Vaazhavanthankottai	No Change
Vengur	Vengoor	No Change
Kundur	Gundoor	No Change
Kattur	Kaattoor	No Change
Pappakurichi	Pappakkurichi	No Change
Ponmalaipatti	Ponmalaippatti	No Change
Bharth Heavy Electrical Limited	Bharath Heavy Electrical Limited (Kailaasapuram)	No Change
Barma Colony	Barma Kudiyiruppu	No Change
Manaparai	Manapparai	No Change
Adampatti	Aadhampatti	Aathampatti
Amayapuram	Amaiyapuram	No Change
Aniyapur	Aniyappoor	No Change
Chattrappatti	Chatthirappatti	No Change
Chettichattram	Chettichatthiram	No Change
Chittanattam	Sitthanattham	No Change
Dhavalavirampatti	Thavalaveerampatti	No Change
I.Idaiyappatti	Inam Idaiyappatti	No Change
F.Kezhiur	Ef.Keezhaiyur	Ef.Keezhaiyoor
Kumaravadi	Kumaaravadi	No Change
Madampatti	Madhampatti	Mathampatti
Mogavanur (North)	Mogavanoor (North)	Mokavanoor (Vadakku)
Mogavanur (South)	Mogavanoor (South)	Mokavanoor (Therku)
Mukkureddippatti	Mookkureddippatti	No Change
Nallampillai	Nallaampillai	No Change
Palaiyakottai	Pazhaiyakottai	No Change
V.Periyapatti	Vee.Periyapatti	No Change
Pudukkottai	Pudhukkottai	Puthukkottai
Pudur	Pudhoor	Puthoor
Puduvadi	Pudhuvadi	Puthuvaadi
Puttanattam	Putthanattham	Putthaanattham
Samudram	Samutthiram	No Change
Sampatti	Saampatti	No Change
Sevalur	Sevaloor	No Change
Siegampatti	Seegampatti	Seekampatti

=== Theni ===
Names in English	Proposed by District Collectors	Proposed by the Committee
Kattunaickenpatti	Kattunayakkanpatti	No Change
Kuppinaickenpatti	Kuppinayakkanpatti	No Change
Alagarnaickanpatti	Azhakarnayakkanpatti	No Change
E. Pudukottai	E. Pudhukottai	No Change
Gullapuram	Kullappuram	No Change
Vadapudupatti	Vadapudhupatti	Vadaputhupatti
Bomminaickanpatti	Bomminayakkanpatti	No Change
Saruthupatti	Saruthuppatti	No Change
Palacombai	Palakombai	No Change
Palayakottai	Pazhayakottai	Pazhayakkottai
Thimmarasanaickanur	Thimmarasanayakkanur	No Change
Alagapuri	Azhagapuri	No Change
Gokilapuram	Kokilapuram	No Change
Kutchanur	Kuchanur	No Change
Keelakudalur East	Keezhakoodalur kizhakku	No Change
Keelakudalur West	Keezhakoodalur Merku	No Change
Melakudalur North	Melakoodalur Vadakku	No Change
Melakudalur South	Melakoodalur Therku	No Change
Kombai East	Kombai kizhakku	No Change
Kombai West	Kombai merku	No Change
Uthamapalayam North	Uthamapalayam vadakku	Uthamapaalayam vadakku
Uthamapalayam South	Uthamapalayam therku	Uthamapaalayam therku
Narayanathevanpatti North	Narayanathevanpatti vadakku	No Change
Narayanathevanpatti South	Narayanathevanpatti Therku	No Change
Thevaram Hills	Thevaram malai	No Change
Thamminaickanpatty	Thamminayakkanpatti	No Change
Lakshminaickenpatti	Lakshminayakkanpatti	No Change
Erasai Hills	Erasai Malai	No Change
Ramasamynaickanpatty	Ramasaminayakkanpatti	No Change

=== Kanyakumari ===
Names in English	Proposed by District Collectors	Proposed by the Committee
Nagercoil	Nagerkovil	No Change
Suchindrum	Suchindhiram	No Change
Gnalam	Gnaalam	No Change
Thuckalay	Thakkalai	No Change
Colachel	Kulachchal	No Change
Surulacode	Surulacodu	No Change
Kumaracoil	Kumarakovil	Kumaarakovil
Keezhmidalam	Keezhmidaalam	No Change

=== Vellore ===
Names in English	Proposed by District Collectors	Proposed by the Committee
Vellore	Veloor	Veeloor
Anaicut	Anaikkattu	No Change
Ranipet	Ranipettai	No Change
Pernambut	Peranampattu	Peranaampattu
Arcot	Aarkadu	No Change
K.V.Kuppam	Keezhvazhithunaiyan Kuppam	No Change
Elagiri Hills	Yelagiri Malai	No Change

=== Madurai ===
Names in English	Proposed by District Collectors	Proposed by the Committee
Madurai	Mathurai	No Change
Melmadurai	Melmathurai	No Change
North madurai	Vadakku mathurai	No Change
Anaiyur	Anaiyoor	AAnaiyoor
Thenur	Thenoor	No Change
Arumbanur	Arumbanoor	No Change
G. Pappankulam Group	Ka. Pappankulam	No Change
Meenakshipuram	Meenachipuram	No Change
Kunnathur	Kunnathoor	No Change
Melur	Meloor	No Change
T. Kallupatti	The. Kallupatti	No Change
M. Sengulam Group	Mo. Sengulam	M. Sengulam
T. Kunnathur	The. Kunnathoor	No Change
Athanur	Aathanoor	Aathanoor
Lakshmipuram Group	Latchumipuram	Latchumipuram
Nilaiyur	Nilaiyoor	No Change
T. Andipatti	Tha. Andipatti	T. Aandippatti
Koviltenkarai	Kovil Thenkarai	No Change
Urappanur	Urappanoor	No Change
Mathippanur	Mathippanoor	No Change
T. Puthupatti Group	Tha. Puthuppatti	No Change
T. Andipatti Group	Tha. Aandippatti	T. Aandippatti
S. Puliankulam Group	Sow. Puliankulam	S. Puliankulam
NeduMadurai	NeduMathurai	No Change

=== Dindigul ===
Names in English	Proposed by District Collectors	Proposed by the Committee
Dindigul	Thindukkal	No Change
Attur	Athoor	AAthoor
Sendurai	Senthurai	No Change
Vadamadurai	Vadamathurai	No Change
Vedasandur	Vedasanthoor	No Change
Reddiyarchatram	Rettiyarchathiram	No Change
Devathur	Devathoor	Devathoor
Kallimandayam	Kallimanthayam	No Change
Ambadurai	Ambathurai	No Change
Vatalagundu	Vaththalagundu	Vaththalakundu
Balasamudram	Balasamuthiram	No Change
K. Pudukottai	Ka. Puthukottai	No Change
N. Panchampatti	Ni. Panchampatti	No Change
K. Keeranur	Ko.Keeranoor	No Change
R. Vellodu	Era. Vellodu	No Change
D. Kudalur	Thi. Kudaloor	No Change
A. Chittoor	A. Chittoor	No Change
A. Kombai	Ay. Kombai	A. Kombai
V. Pudukottai	Ve. Puthukottai	No Change
M. Vadipatti	Mu. Vadipatti	No Change
E. Vadipatti	E. Vadipatti	No Change
M. Athappampatti	Ma. Athappampatti	Aththappampatti
Silaipadi	Seelappadi	No Change

=== Erode ===
Names in English	Proposed by District Collectors	Proposed by the Committee
Erode	Erodu	No Change
V. Vellode	Va.Vellodu	Vadamugam Vellodu
T.Vellode	The. Vellodu	Thenmugam Vellodu
K.G.Valasu	Ka.Ka.Valasu	Kanthappa Kavundan Valasu
K.B.Malam	Ka.Pa.Maalam	Kaadu Pasuvan Maalam
P.K.Velampalayam	Pu.Kaa.Velampalayam	Punjai Kaalamangalam Velampaalayam
Oodadurai	Oodaththurai	No Change
Perode	Perodu	No Change
Anthiur	Anthiyoor	No Change
T.N.Palayam	Thu.Naa,Paalayam	No Change
P. Vellalappaalayam	Paa.Vellalappaalayam	No Change
P.Mettuppaalayam	Pe.Mettuppaalayam	No Change
P.Kallippatty	Pa.Kallippatty	No Change

=== Tiruvarur ===
Names in English	Proposed by District Collectors	Proposed by the Committee
Tiruvarur	Thiruvarur	Thiruvaroor
Muthupet	Muthupettai	Muthuppettai
Tiruthuraipundi	Thiruthurai Poondi	Thirutthurai Poondi
Kudavasal	Kudavasal	Kudavaasal
Ariyalur	Aariyalur	Aariyaloor
Avur	Aavur	Aavoor
Alathambadi	Aalathambadi	No Change
Lakshmangudi	Letchumaangudi	No Change
Nidamangalam	Needamangalam	Needaamangalam

=== Thanajvur ===
Names in English	Proposed by District Collectors	Proposed by the Committee
Orathanadu	Orathanaadu	Oratthanaadu
Ammapet	Ammapettai	No Change
Alakkudi	Aalakkudi	No Change
Kattur	Kaattur	Kaattoor
Mathur	Maathur	Maaththoor
Nagathi	Naagathi	Naagatthi
Vilar	Vilaar	No Change
Pachur	Paachur	Paachoor
Kudalur	Koodalur	Koodaloor
Mudalceri	Muthalcheri	No Change
Chitrakudi	Chithrakudi	Chithirakkudi
Karambakkadu	Karambakkaadu	No Change

=== Namakkal ===
Names in English	Proposed by District Collectors	Proposed by the Committee
Bail Nad	Pail Nadu	Pail Naadu
Valavanthi Nadu	Vazhavanthi Nadu	Vazhavanthi Naadu
Thiruppuli Nadu	Tiruppuli Nadu	Thiruppuli Naadu
Sellur Nadu	Selur Nadu	Seloor Naadu
Tipramahadevi	M. Thipramahadevi	M. Thipramahaadevi
Mettupatti	M. Metupatti	M. Mettuppatti
Sengapalli	Sengapalli	Sengapalli
Kumarapalayam	Kumarapalayam	Kumarapalayam
Sircar Valavandhi	Sircar Valavandhi	Sircar Valavandhi
Perumandapalayam	Perumandapalayam	Perumandapalayam
