= St. Xavier's College, Palayamkottai =

Jesuit college in Tamil Nadu, India

Coordinates: 8°43′4.87″N 77°44′19.57″E

- Motto: Veritate Lumen et Vita; Light & Life through Truth
- Established: 1923; 103 years ago
- Affiliations: Manonmaniam Sundaranar University
- Religious affiliation: Jesuit (Roman Catholic)
- Rector: Rev. Fr. Dr. S. Ignacimuthu, SJ
- Principal: Rev. Fr. Dr. Godwin Rufus, SJ
- Location: Palayamkottai, Tamil Nadu, India
- Campus: 58 acres
- Website: txavierstn.edu.in

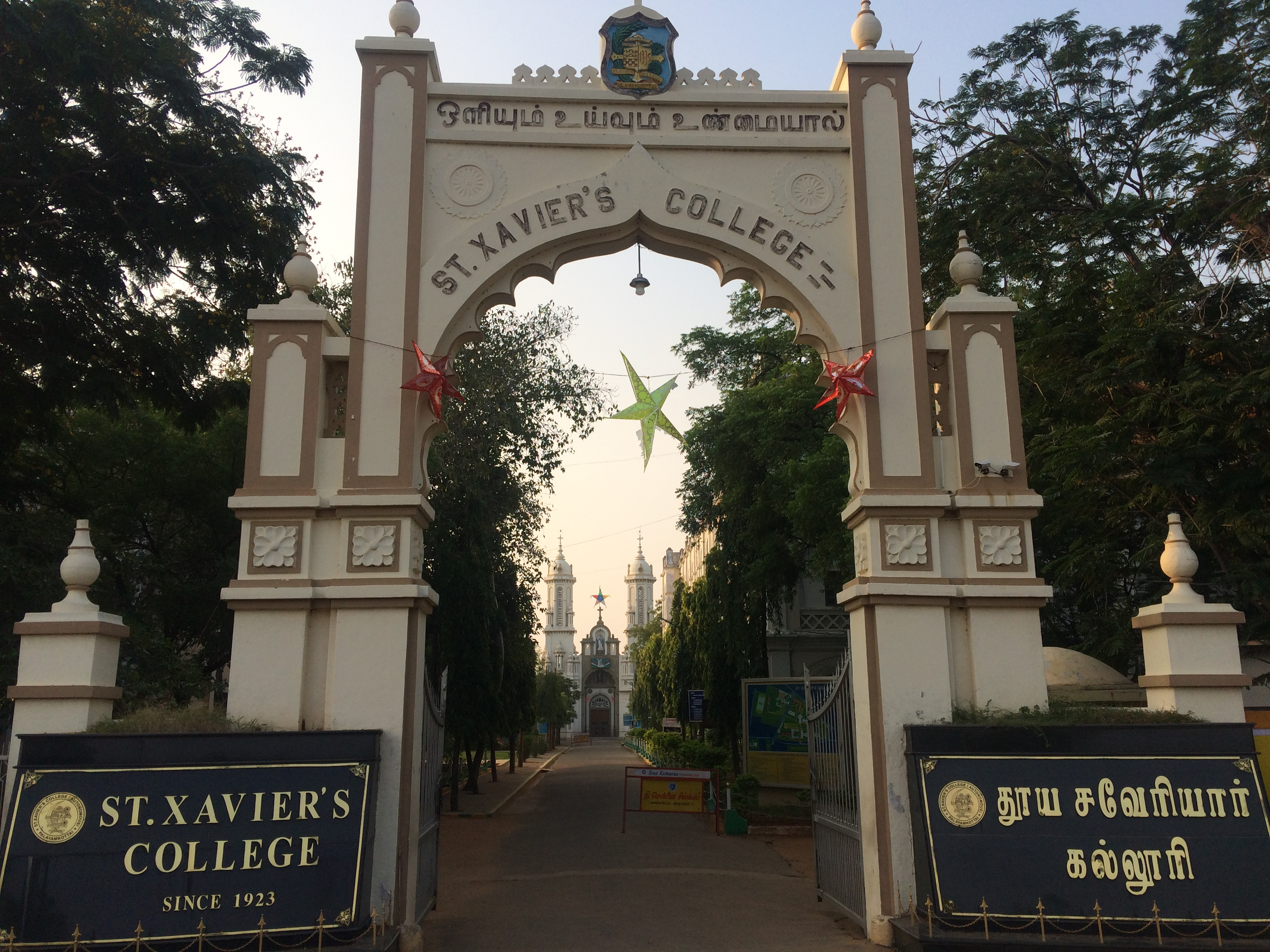
St. Xavier's College, Palayamkottai

St. Xavier's College, Palayamkottai, is a Jesuit college of arts and science affiliated to Manonmaniam Sundaranar University, Tamil Nadu, India. The college was founded in 1923 by Jesuit Fr. Jerome D'Souza (1897–1977). The college is ranked 36th among colleges in India by the National Institutional Ranking Framework (NIRF) in 2024.

== Academics ==
The Bachelor of Arts degree (BA) is offered in English and economics, besides a Bachelor of Commerce (BCom). The Bachelor of Science (BSc) is offered in mathematics, physics, chemistry, computer science, botany, and zoology. The Master of Arts (MA) is offered in Tamil and folklore and communication, along with the Master of Commerce (M.Com.). The Master of Science (MSc) is offered in mathematics, botany, and zoology. Part-time and full-time programmes award the Master of Philosophy (MPhil) in Tamil, mathematics, and zoology. The doctorate (PhD) is offered in Tamil, English, folklore and communication, commerce, mathematics, physics, chemistry, computer science, botany, and zoology.

"Sciencia Acta Xaveriana" (SAX) is an international research journal of basic and applied sciences which publishes original research papers, review articles, book reviews, and dissertation abstracts in the various areas of science. It has been published twice annually since 2010.

== Alumni ==
The college has an active Alumni Association. One of its projects is the medical service extended to the students, the teaching community of the college, and the public in the area. It offers blood analysis and other tests also like electrocardiogram (ECG) at a reduced price.

Prominent alumni

- Mar Sebastian Valloppilly: First Bishop of the Archeparchy of Tellicherry
- W. Selvamurthy: Former Chief controller of DRDO and current President of Amity University, Noida.
- S. Muthusamy: former Member of the Legislative Assembly; transport minister & health minister.
- M. Arunachalam: former Member of Parliament
- V. Gopalsamy (Vaiko): founder Marumalarchi Dravida Munnetra Kazhagam political party
- S. Peter Alphonse: Member of Legislative Assembly
- Thalavai Sundaram Pillai: former Member of the Legislative Assembly
- S.A. Chandrasekhar: Indian film director, producer, and writer
- Po. Ma. Rajamani: scholar, writer of 79 books in Tamil
- Vijay Antony: Indian music composer, playback singer, actor, lyricist and film maker.

U. Sankar, former director, Madras School of Economics, Member Tamil Nadu State

 Planning Commission 2001 -04, UGC NATIONAL AWARD IN ECONOMICS2006, ICSSR national 
 FELLOW 2003,2004, AUTHOR, The Economics of India's Space Programme 0UP 2007

== Xavier Institute of Business Administration ==
Xavier Institute of Business Administration
- Palayamkottai 627002; Tamil Nadu, India

Information
- Type: Jesuit, Catholic
- Denomination: All faiths
- Established: 2012; 14 years ago
- Rector: Dr. Danis Ponniah, SJ
- Director: Dr. S. Arockiasamy, SJ
- Principal: Dr. V. Gilburt Camillus, SJ
- Gender: Coeducational
- Campus: Urban, Xavier College
- Accreditation: AICTE
- Publication: XIBA Business Review
- Affiliations: Manonmaniam Sundaranar University
- Website: xibasxc

Xavier Institute of Business Administration (XIBA) was started in August 2012 as the Department of Master of Business Administration, affiliated to Manonmaniam Sundaranar University, Tirunelveli, and approved by AICTE. XIBA offers a two years Master's programme (MBA).

=== Curriculum ===
The academic programme consists of 4 semesters spread over two years. First year courses cover basics of finance and accounting, marketing, organizational behaviour, communication skills, production, and quantitative techniques. In addition each student studies French or Hindi. The first summer is spent in a six to eight-week internship, which concludes with both written and oral reports. The internship programme begins with weekly projects in a place close to the institute. Later, summer internship gives a longer stay in an industry for a deeper learning experience.
The second year involves specialization in two core areas of management such as finance, marketing, operations and human resource management.
XIBA also hosts about a dozen active clubs of a professional, social, or religious nature.
There is also a post-graduate department of business studies. The Institute publishes the XIBA Business Review.

== See also ==
- List of Jesuit sites
