= Avelin Mary =

Indian marine biologist

Sister Avelin Mary
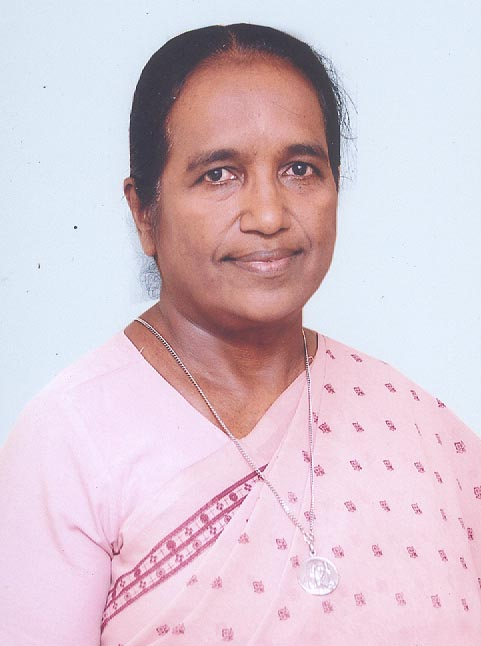
- Mary in July 2017
- Education: Marathwada University Ph.D, marine biology
- Alma mater: St. Mary's College, Tuticorin
- Occupation: Marine Biologist
- Awards: National Environmental Science Academy (NESA) Scientists of the Year for 2002, Netaji Subhash Chandra Bose National Award for Excellence in 2003

Avelin Mary is a marine biologist and a Roman Catholic nun belonging to the Congregation of the Mother of Sorrows, Servants of Mary. She is a Director of Sacred Heart Marine Research Center (SHMRC), Tuticorin.

== Education ==
Mary received her Ph.D. in marine biology from Marathwada University, Aurangabad. She completed her post-doctoral work at Osborne Laboratories (New York Zoological Society) and Duke University Marine Laboratories (Beaufort, North Carolina). She was a visiting scientist at Tulane University, Duke University, University of Delaware, University of Hawaii and Fu Jen Catholic University in Taiwan.

In 1988, she returned to India to establish her own independent research group. Her research area is the biology of barnacles. Her specific interest is in the replacement of toxic chemicals affecting the ocean environment with alternative compounds from natural sources that may have similar functional properties without the toxic effects on other marine organisms.

== Career ==
Mary was the principal of St. Mary's College, a Catholic institution for higher education of women in Tuticorin.

In 1991, she founded Sacred Heart Marine Research Center (SHMRC) as an independent non-profit organization for the purpose of marine research and conservation. She is currently the Director of the institute, which is affiliated with U.S.-based research and development company Poseidon Ocean Sciences, Inc.

During her study of corals, she discovered they produce chemicals that could prevent fouling in ships and save millions of dollars.

== Awards ==
Mary was named one of the "2,000 outstanding scientists of the 20th century" by the International Biographical Research Centre at Cambridge. In 1999, the vanity press American Biographical Institute awarded her "Woman of the Year 1998",

In 2002, she was recognized by India's National Environmental Science Academy (NESA) in New Delhi as one of 14 Scientists of the Year. She received the award in Calcutta.

In January 2003, she was one of 12 recipients of the Jagruthi Kiran Foundation's 2003 Netaji Subhash Chandra Bose National Award for Excellence.
