= Government Siddha Medical College Palayamkottai =

Government Siddha Medical College, Palayamkottai
- Type: Medical college and hospital
- Established: 1964
- Affiliations: The Tamil Nadu Dr. M.G.R. Medical University
- Undergraduates: 100
- Postgraduates: 50+
- Location: Palayankottai Tirunelveli, Tamil Nadu, India
- Campus: Urban
- Website: www.gsmcpalay.ac.in

Government Siddha Medical College, Palayamkottai is a Central Council of Indian Medicine (CCIM), New Delhi recognized medical college located at Palayamkottai, Tirunelvel in Tamil Nadu. It is situated in Palayamkottai city which is about 4 km from Tirunelveli Junction. Established in 1964, it is offering courses in alternate medicine.

== History ==
The college was established on 30 November 1964 to provide traditional Indian Siddha medicine to the nearby population. The hospital attached to the college has a capacity of 350 beds to treat in-patients.

== Courses ==
Bachelor of Siddha Medicine and Surgery (BSMS), and PG degree, M.D. SIDDHA (Siddha Maruthuva Perarignar) in the following area: Maruthuvam, Gunapadam, Sirappu Maruthuvam, Kuzhandai Maruthuvam (Pillaipini Maruthuvam), Noi Nadal, Nanju Noolum Maruthuva Neethi Noolum is provided by the college. Courses offered by the college is approved and affiliated by Tamil Nadu Dr M.G.R Medical University, Chennai.

== Admissions ==
BSMS is listed one of the courses under the AYUSH courses that are offered in educational institutions in India. This undergraduate course is conducted for a duration of 5 years, like other medical courses in India. The objective of BSMS is to educate its aspirants on scientific knowledge of Siddha so as to produce graduates who are qualified and trained to become surgeons, physicians, teachers as well as research scholars in the field. From the academic year 2020–21, admissions to BSMS is made through NEET or National Eligibility cum Entrance Exam and done through NEET Counseling process. Candidates, based on their score or rank will be allotted a college, which will also depend on the availability of seats and choices filled in by the candidate.

Qualification for admission

| Sl. No. | Course | Eligibility |
| 1. | BSMS | 10+2 or equivalent qualification with Physics, Chemistry, Biology as main subjects |
| 2. | MD (Siddha) | Pass in BSMS or equivalent qualification |
