= St. Ignatius' Convent Higher Secondary School =

Location
- Punithavathiyar street Palayamkottai; Palayamkottai; Tirunelveli, Tamil Nadu, 627002; India

Information
- School type: aided
- Motto: Virtue is our strongest shield
- Patron saint: St.Ignatius
- Established: 1921
- Head of school: Sister
- Gender: female
- Classes: 6th to 12th
- Education system: samacheer kalvi
- Language: English, Tamil, Hindi, French (for 11th and 12th)
- Hours in school day: 8:30 am to 5:00 pm
- Colours: green and white
- Slogan: Virtue is our strongest shield
- Song: Virtue is our strongest shield
- Nickname: Convent
- Affiliation: Tamil Nadu State Board

St. Ignatius' Convent Higher Secondary School is a school for girls in Palayamkottai, Tirunelveli. The school is run by the Sisters of the Immaculate Heart of Mary. It is popularly known for its discipline and good education.

== History ==
Before the independence of India, there was a need for a girls' school in Tirunelveli. To meet this need, St. Ignatius' was founded in 1921 by a Belgian sister called Mother Marie Louise de Meester. Initially, when the school was started there were only three students, but has grown to nearly 4000 students.

== Motto ==
The motto of the school is Virtue is our strongest shield.
