= St. Mary's College, Thoothukudi =

College

- Type: Public
- Established: 1948
- Affiliations: Manonmaniam Sundaranar University
- Location: Thoothukudi, Tamil Nadu, India
- Campus: Urban
- Website: http://www.stmaryscollege.edu.in

St. Mary's College, Thoothukudi, is a women's general degree college located in Thoothukudi, Tamil Nadu. It was established in the year 1948. The college is affiliated with Manonmaniam Sundaranar University. This college offers different courses in arts, commerce and science.

== Departments ==
=== Science ===
- Physics
- Chemistry
- Mathematics
- Botany
- Zoology
- Computer Science

=== Arts and Commerce ===
- Tami

Computer Application

- English
- Economics
- History
- Commerce

== Accreditation ==
The college is recognized by the University Grants Commission (UGC).
