= Aazhigudi =

Azhigudi
- village
- Location in Tamil Nadu, India Azhigudi (India)
- Coordinates: 8°41′30″N 77°50′0″E
- Country: India
- State: Tamil Nadu
- District: Tuticorin

Area
  - Total: 8 km^{2} (3.1 sq mi)

Population
  - Total: 1,250
  - Density: 125/km^{2} (320/sq mi)

Languages
  - Official: Tamil
- Time zone: UTC+5:30 (IST)
- PIN: 628809
- Telephone code: 04630
- Vehicle registration: TN69
- Coastline: 0 kilometres (0 mi)
- Nearest city: Tirunelveli
- Sex ratio: 51:49 ♂/♀
- Literacy: 67%
- Climate: summer/winter (Köppen)
- Avg. summer temperature: 35 °C (95 °F)
- Avg. winter temperature: 25 °C (77 °F)

Aazhigudi is a village in the Tuticorin District of Tamil Nadu, India. It is 12 km from Tirunelveli, and the river Thamirabarani passes to the east. It falls under the jurisdiction of Srivaikundam taluk.

== Geography ==
It is located at 8°41′30″N 77°50′0″E.

== Demographics ==
The total population of Aazhigudi is 1250, of which males constitute 49%. Literacy is 65%.

== Geography ==
Aazhigudi is 3 km from the 6-lane bypass of National Highway 44 and 4 km from Thiruchendur road. The village is well connected to Tirunelveli and Tuticorin by road. Bus services to these cities operate via Palayamkottai. The Thambirabarani River passes to the east of this village.

== Landmarks ==
The village of Aazhigudi contains a temple named Mutharamman, Maradachan and Uykaatu sudalai, noted for its 20-foot statue made of stone, The Roman Catholic church, is also located in the village and its feast day is celebrated on 1 October.
