= Uzhavar Santhai =

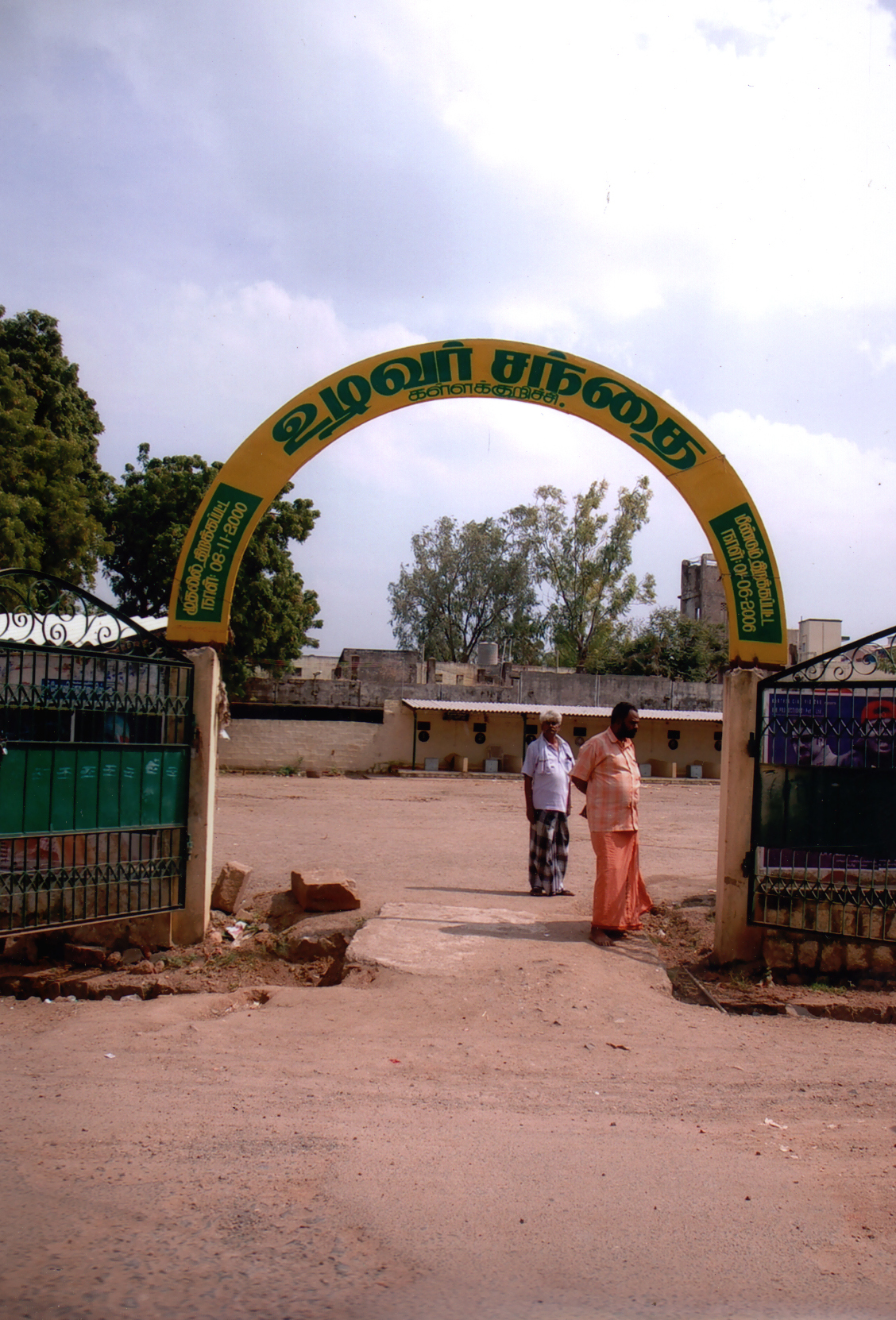
Uzhavar Sandhai at Kallakurichi

Uzhavar Sandhai (mohana santhai) is a scheme of the Government of Tamil Nadu to promote direct contact between farmers and consumers in the Indian state of Tamil Nadu.

== Background ==
The scheme was introduced in 1999 by the state government under M. Karunanidhi, the chief of Dravida Munnetra Kazhagam (DMK). The first Uzhavar Sandhai was inaugurated in madurai on 14 November 1999. The objective of the scheme was to promote direct contact between farmers and consumers, through which the farmer can get full profit without middlemen or brokers. In 2001, when the opposition Anna Dravida Munnetra Kazhagam (ADMK) came into power, the scheme was stalled. It was revived again by the DMK after it came to power in 2006. In 2011, ADMK formed the government but continued with the scheme. The markets are maintained and regulated by the Tamil Nadu State Agricultural Marketing Board and prices to the products are fixed on day basis.
