= Manonmaniam Sundaranar University =

Public university in Tamil Nadu, India

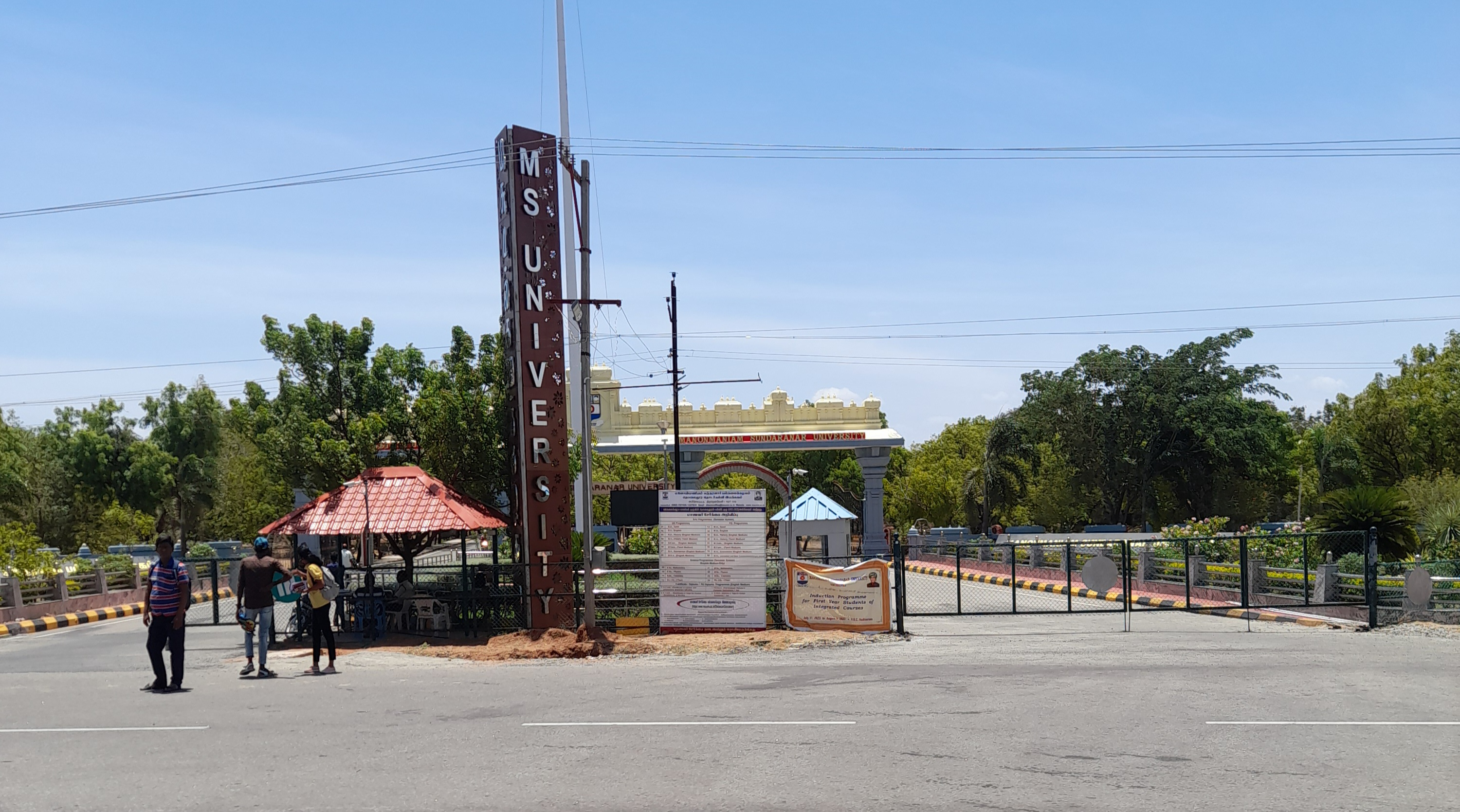
- Main entrance
- Motto: Knowledge is power
- Type: Public
- Established: September 7, 1990; 35 years ago
- Affiliations: UGC, NAAC
- Chancellor: Governor of Tamil Nadu
- Vice-Chancellor: Dr. S. Prabhakar (acting)
- Location: Tirunelveli, Tamil Nadu, India; 8°45′52″N 77°38′57″E
- Campus: Rural
- Website: http://www.msuniv.ac.in

Manonmaniam Sundaranar University (MSU) is a public university located in Tirunelveli, Tamil Nadu, India. It was split from Madurai Kamaraj University on 7 September 1990 to cater to the needs of the people of the three southernmost districts of Tamil Nadu — Tirunelveli, Thoothukudi and Kanyakumari. It is named after the Tamil scholar and professor Manonmaniam Sundaram Pillai.

The university has 6 constituent University colleges (also known as "Mano colleges") with 29 departments in arts, languages, sciences, engineering and technology, teaching 2,384 university students as of 2025. 104 other colleges in the Kanyakumari, Tenkasi, Thoothukudi and Tirunelveli districts are also affiliated with MSU. This includes six colleges over 100 years old, such as Sarah Tucker College, the oldest women's college in Southern India.

Overall, the university provides education to approximately 130,885 students in person and 11,236 students via distance education.

== Accreditation ==
The University Grants Commission has accorded its approval for getting financial assistance since 29 March 1994. The university is accredited by the National Assessment and Accreditation Council of India with 'A' grade status. The University Act authorizes the functioning of the Directorate of Distance and Continuing Education outside the university jurisdiction and the courses offered through this mode are recognized by the Distance Education Council of India.

== Campuses ==
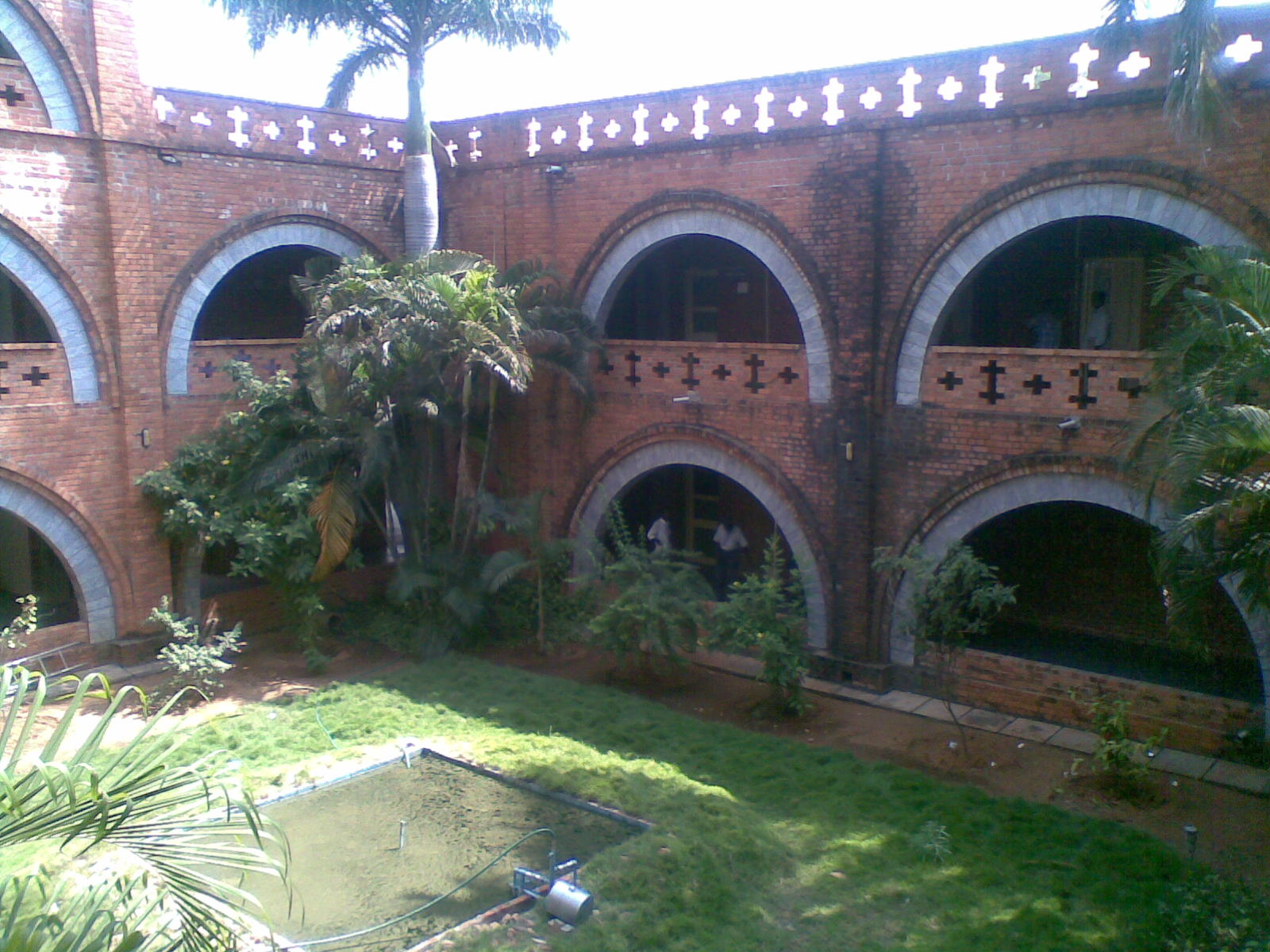
Academic building inner view

Its main campus is a 520 acres (2.1 km^{2}) site in Abishekapatti, Tirunelveli, where the majority of the university departments are located. Another 120 acres (0.49 km^{2}) campus in Alwarkurichi houses the Sri Parama Kalyani Centre for Environmental Sciences department, and a 70 acres (280,000 m^{2}) campus at Rajakkamangalam houses the Centre for Marine Sciences and Technology.

=== Constituent colleges ===
College	District	Year founded	Campus size	Courses offered
Tisayanvilai	Tirunelveli	2009	5 acres	BA Tamil, English, BCom, BSc Mathematics, MA English, M.Com
Govindaperi	Tirunelveli	2000	5.5 acres	BA Tamil, English, BBA, BCom, BSc Computer science, Chemistry, Mathematics, Physics, MA English, MCom, MSc Mathematics
Puliangudi	Tenkasi	2000		BA English, BBA, BCom, BSc Computer Science, Mathematics
Nagampatti	Thoothukudi	2003	33 acres	BA Tamil, BBA, BCom, BSc Mathematics
Naduvakurichi, Sankarankovil	Tenkasi			BA English, BBA, BCom, BSc Computer Science, Mathematics
Panagudi	Tirunelveli	2010		BA Tamil, English, BCom, BSC Mathematics, MCom

=== Community colleges ===
The community colleges offer diploma courses of one-year duration to those interested in entrepreneurial enterprises. The Extension Learning Programme offers diploma and certificate courses on skill development.

=== Affiliated colleges ===
College	Year founded	Notes
Sarah Tucker College, Palayamkottai	1895	First women's college in Southern India
Scott Christian College, Nagercoil	1809	
St. Xavier's College, Palayamkottai	1923	
The Madurai Diraviyam Thayumanavar Hindu College, Tirunelveli	1879	
St John's College, Palayamkottai	1844	
