= W. Selvamurthy =

Indian scientist

William Selvamurthy
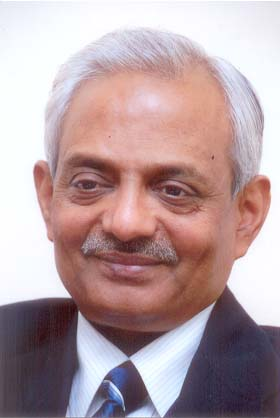
- Born: 15 February 1949 (age 77); Sivakasi, Tamil Nadu, India
- Citizenship: India
- Education: St. Xaviers College, Palayamkottai. Christian Medical College, Vellore. Delhi University
- Known for: Life Support Technologies for Armed Forces
- Awards: Atma-Swasthya Sri (2012), National Award for S&T Innovations (2012) by Prime Minister, Prize named after Academician Mirsaid Mirrakhimov "For Contribution to High Altitude Medicine" (2012), AchantaLakshmipathi Oration (2011), DRDO Technology Leadership Award (2010), Life Time Achievement Award from A. P. J. Abdul Kalam, President of India (2006 and 2007), ICMR National Award – Shakuntala Amirchand Award (1976)
- Scientific career
- Fields: Physiology, Psychology, Life Sciences
- Workplaces: Amity University, Noida and DRDO
- Doctoral advisor: Prof. H. S. Nayar
- Doctoral students: Padmavathy Bandopadhyay

William Selvamurthy is an Indian scientist, currently working with Amity University, Raipur, as President of Amity Science, Technology and Innovation Foundation and Director General for Amity Directorate of Science and Innovation. He previously served as a Chief Controller, Research & Development (Life Sciences & International Cooperation) at the Defence Research and Development Organisation for the Indian government.

He is leading research and development for improvements to the health and wellbeing of the armed forces.

== Education ==
He did his post-graduation in Human Physiology from Christian Medical College, Vellore (1972) and PhD from University of Delhi (1982) and Doctorate of Science (DSc) from Swami Vivekananda Yoga Anusandhana Samsthana Deemed University in Bangalore (2006). Recently he was awarded the Degree of Doctor of Science (DSc) (Honoris Causa) in recognition of his contributions to the field of science and his distinctive place in the scientific world by Fakir Mohan University, Balasore (2008). He was awarded another further honorary degrees of Doctor of Science (DSc) from Bharathiar University, Coimbatore (2009), Amity University (2011) and Karunya University (2011).

== Career ==
Selvamurthy joined the Defence Research and Development Organisation (DRDO) in 1973 and served there for 40 years, during which time he became Director of two DRDO institutes: the Defence Institute of Physiology and Allied Sciences (DIPAS), and the Defence Institute of Psychological Research (DIPR). He took the latter role in 1992 and held it for over 10 years. His research contributions while working at DRDO included:

- Physiological acclimatisation at high altitude
- Application of yoga for the Armed forces
- Development of a drug to save war casualties subjected to severe hemorrhage
- Psychological stress and its management
- Life support systems for soldiers in extreme operational environments

Selvamurthy joined Amity in 2013 as President (Honorary) of the Amity Science, Technology and Innovation Foundation. He was awarded the Thangam Vasudevan Research Prize by the Indian Association of Biomedical Award Scientists in 1981, and was a fellow of the National Academy of Medical Sciences.

== Books ==
- Contributions to Human Biometeorology edited by W. Selvamurthy (1987) ISBN 90-5103-004-5
- Brain & Psychophysiology of Stress edited by W. Selvamurthy, K. N. Sharma and N. Battacharya (1988)
- Compendium of DIPAS Projects edited by W. Selvamurthy, K. Sridharan and L. Mathew (1988)
- Biometeorology, Vol 9, Part-I (Abstracts) edited by W. Selvamurthy, S. C. Pandeya and H. Lieth (1983)
- Stress Physiology edited by W. Selvamurthy, K. Sridharan and B. N. Chaudhari (1989)
- Advance in Physiological Sciences edited by W. Selvamurthy, S. K. Manchanda and V. Mohan Kumar (1992)
- Physiology of Human Performance edited by W. Selvamurthy, Kadambi Sridharan and Ramesh C. Sawhney (1994)
- Meditation edited by W. Selvamurthy, Ramesh C. Sawhney and Lajpat Rai (1999)
- Human Food edited by W. Selvamurthy, Ramesh C. Sawhney, Lajpat Rai and B. Bhatia (1999)
- Battle Scene in Year 2020 edited by W. Selvamurthy, P. N. Chaudhari (1999)
- Rosary of Lord's Name edited by W. Selvamurthy, Ramesh C. Sawhney and Lajpat Rai (1999)
- Advances in Ergonomics, Occupational Health and Safety edited by W. Selvamurthy and D. Majumdar (2000) ISBN 81-224-1277-7
- Body Measurement : Design Application & Body Composition edited by W. Selvamurthy, T. Zachariah, S. Kishnani and S. N. Pramanik (2001)
- Soaring High: A Biography of V. K. Aatre by K. Divyananda and W. Selvamurthy (2005) ISBN 81-88237-24-8
- High Altitude Cold Arid Agro Animal Technology edited by W. Selvamurthy, R. B. Srivastava (2011)
