= Sarah Tucker College =

Institution in Palayamkottai, India

- Motto: "So Run that ye may obtain the Incorruptible Crown"
- Established: 1895; 131 years ago
- Founder: Sarah Tucker
- Affiliations: Manonmaniam Sundaranar University
- Principal: Dr.S.Felicia Gladys Sathiadevi
- Students: 3300
- Location: Palayamkottai, Tamil Nadu, India; 8.698733°N 77.740744°E
- Campus: Rural
- Website: sarahtuckercollege.edu.in

The Sarah Tucker College is an institution in Palayamkottai, a town in Tirunelveli District in the southern state of Tamil Nadu in India. It is the first college for women in south India, owing its origin to Sarah Tucker of England and her friends, who raised money for the founding of a small school for training teachers for elementary schools in Tirunelveli District. After this the Sarah Tucker High School was started, which was raised to a college in 1895.

== History ==
Sarah Tucker College was established in 1895, as the first college for women in south India. It is named after Sarah Tucker, a physically challenged woman confined to her room in England. She was moved by the reports of the appalling condition of the women in this region due to their illiteracy and stepped in to provide education for them. The institution began with four students as a second grade college under the University of Madras. It was upgraded to first grade college in 1939 and came under the newly formed Madurai Kamaraj University in 1966.

== Academic programmes ==
The college offers undergraduate programmes, postgraduate, doctoral programmes in the arts and science stream. The college, functioning under the Tirunelveli Diocesan Association (TDTA), is now an autonomous institution under the Manonmaniam Sundaranar University since 2007. The college has been accredited with 'A' Grade National Assessment and Accreditation Council (NAAC).
