= Palayamkottai =

Palayamkottai Palayankottai Pallamcottah (colonial)
- Neighbourhood
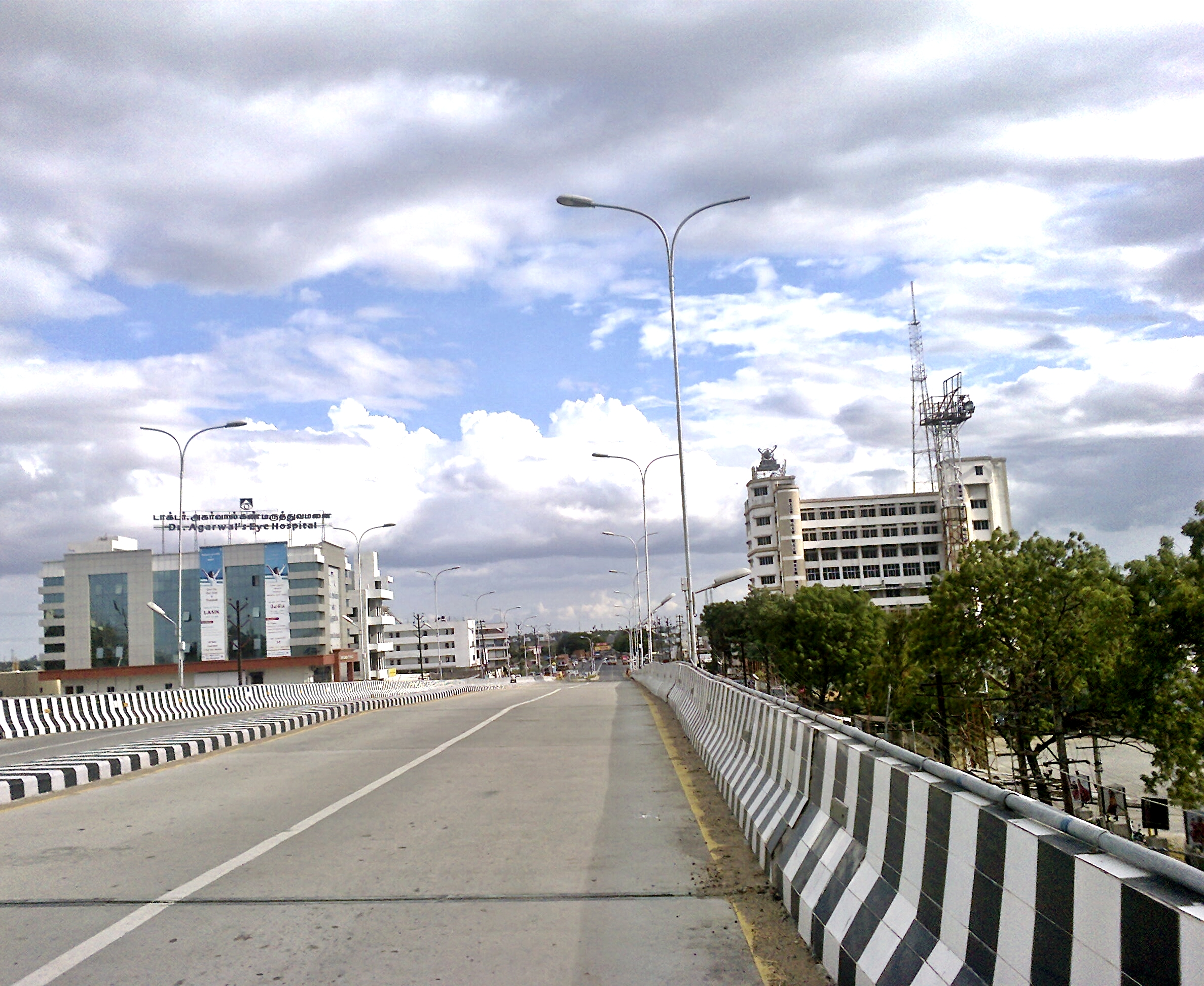
- Speaker Chellapandian Flyover(intersection of North and South Bypass Road near the traffic island of Vannarapettai)
- Nickname: The Oxford of South India
- Location in Tamil Nadu, India
- Coordinates: 8.7166°N 77.7333°E
- Country: India
- State: Tamil Nadu
- District: Tirunelveli

Government
  - Type: Municipal Corporation
  - Body: Tirunelveli City Municipal Corporation

Population
  - Total: 314,795

Languages
  - Official: Tamil
- Time zone: UTC+5:30 (IST)
- Pincode: 627002,627007,627011
- Vehicle registration: TN 72

Palayamkottai (also Palayankottai) is a neighbourhood in Tirunelveli City, incorporated within the Tirunelveli City Municipal Corporation. It is situated on the east bank of the Thamirabarani river, with the exception of its downtown area, which is present on the west bank.

== Etymology ==
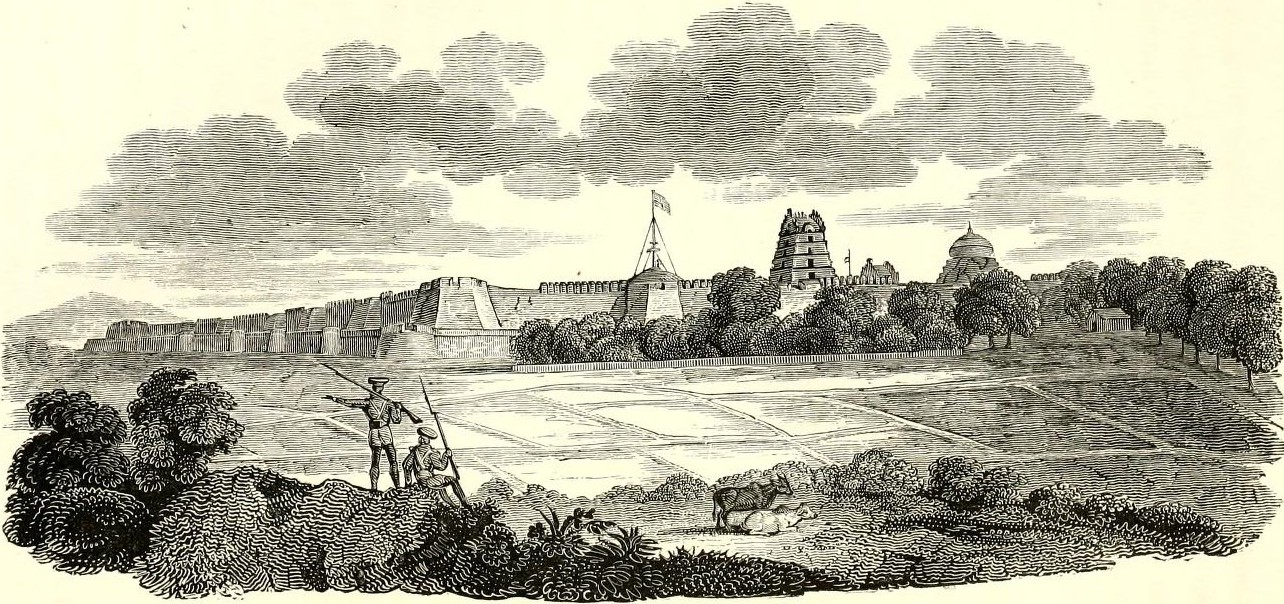
"Fort Pallamcottah" (1800) by James Welsh

The region Palayamkottai in Tamil is a portmanteau of 'palayam', which refers to a settlement, and 'kottai', which translates to a fort. Historically, Palayamkottai served as the locale of an ancient fort that was employed for the administration of neighbouring districts. Today, the fort lies in ruins and is almost camouflaged by its surrounding old residential edifices. While the classical Tamil pronunciation of the neighbourhood's name is the aforementioned Palayamkottai, the vernacular pronunciation of the settlement is more akin to Palayankottai or Palayankotta, with the latter being more widely preferred by the locals.

== Geography ==
Neighbouring cities & towns

Prior to 1994, Tirunelveli and Palayamkottai were formerly administered as two independent municipalities. Tirunelveli and Palayamkottai along with surrounding areas were subsequently merged and established Tirunelveli City, now administered by the Tirunelveli Municipal Corporation.

Palayamkottai is situated on the eastern bank of the perennial Thamirabarani river. The region is very fertile and supports a thriving agrarian community in the midst of many urbanised areas. Regular monsoon rains coupled with the Thamirabarani water sustain the primarily agrarian villages around the city. Palayamkottai is located on the National Highway in close proximity to many bigger cities (international seaport: Tuticorin - 45 km; international airports: Trivandrum - 140 km, Madurai - 150 km; domestic airport: Tuticorin - 25 km) hence supporting trade and commerce.

=== Climate ===
Palayamkottai has a tropical savanna climate (Köppen climate classification As).

Climate data for Palayamkottai (1991–2020, extremes 1947–present)
Month	Jan	Feb	Mar	Apr	May	Jun	Jul	Aug	Sep	Oct	Nov	Dec	Year
Record high °C (°F)	36.0 (96.8)	39.0 (102.2)	41.7 (107.1)	42.0 (107.6)	42.8 (109.0)	44.9 (112.8)	41.9 (107.4)	40.4 (104.7)	40.5 (104.9)	41.0 (105.8)	38.9 (102.0)	37.0 (98.6)	44.9 (112.8)
Mean daily maximum °C (°F)	31.5 (88.7)	33.4 (92.1)	35.3 (95.5)	36.3 (97.3)	37.5 (99.5)	36.1 (97.0)	34.8 (94.6)	35.0 (95.0)	35.6 (96.1)	33.6 (92.5)	30.9 (87.6)	30.3 (86.5)	34.1 (93.4)
Mean daily minimum °C (°F)	22.5 (72.5)	23.1 (73.6)	24.0 (75.2)	25.6 (78.1)	26.3 (79.3)	26.4 (79.5)	26.2 (79.2)	25.9 (78.6)	25.6 (78.1)	24.7 (76.5)	23.7 (74.7)	22.8 (73.0)	24.7 (76.5)
Record low °C (°F)	18.0 (64.4)	18.0 (64.4)	18.4 (65.1)	20.3 (68.5)	16.3 (61.3)	20.4 (68.7)	19.3 (66.7)	21.6 (70.9)	19.5 (67.1)	17.9 (64.2)	16.9 (62.4)	17.6 (63.7)	16.9 (62.4)
Average rainfall mm (inches)	14.0 (0.55)	19.3 (0.76)	31.9 (1.26)	64.7 (2.55)	56.2 (2.21)	9.9 (0.39)	11.9 (0.47)	34.5 (1.36)	45.1 (1.78)	161.4 (6.35)	217.0 (8.54)	96.2 (3.79)	762.0 (30.00)
Average rainy days	1.7	1.4	2.1	3.6	3.0	1.2	0.9	1.9	3.0	7.7	10.6	5.6	42.7
Average relative humidity (%) (at 17:30 IST)	64	57	54	58	55	55	55	55	53	63	72	69	59
Source: India Meteorological Department

== Religion ==
Hinduism is the dominant faith in Palayamkottai. The city has several Hindu temples: the Gopalaswamy temple, Thiripuraanthakaeshwarar temple, Ramar temple, and the Amman temple.

The renovation of the Gopalaswamy temple was completed by the Government of Tamil Nadu recently. It is a Vishnu temple that embodies the cultural and architectural legacy of the city. The herbal wall paintings found inside the sanctum sanctorum are considered to be rare. Built in the 11th century, the institution held its Kumbhabhishekham (consecration ceremony) on 9 July 2009.

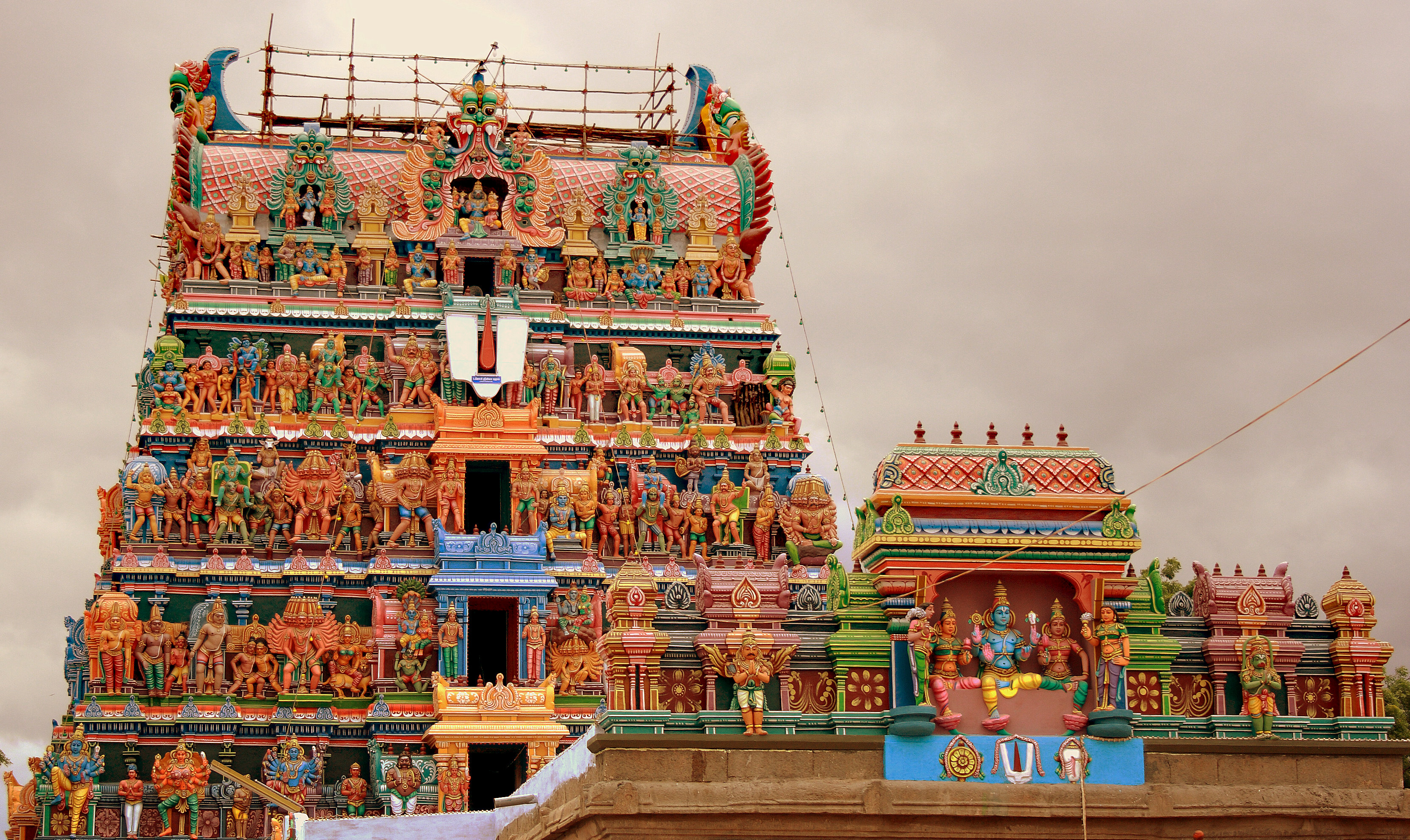
Gopalaswamy Temple

A popular mosque in the city is located on the old Police Hospital road, with hundreds of Islamic followers chanting their prayers regularly. Melapalayam is the Muslim quarter of the city, with several mosques and schools.

The city is an epicenter in south Tamil Nadu for Christianity, scattered with a number of churches affiliated to the Tirunelveli Diocese Society of Jesus Jesuits, Church of South India (CSI), others.

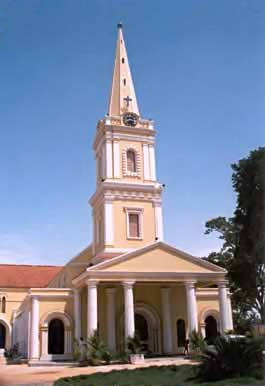
Holy Trinity Cathedral

Joseph Constantine Beschi, better known among locals as 'Veeramaamunivar', propagated Christianity in the area. St.Xaviers' Cathedral church, situated at the heart of St. Xaviers' College and established by Jesuit priests, was among the earliest Catholic Churches in Palayamkottai. The St.Xaviers' College church is dedicated to Our Lady of the Assumption.

== Politics ==
Palayamkottai assembly constituency is a part of Tirunelveli (Lok Sabha constituency).

== Landmarks ==
Major localities in Palayamkottai are Vannarapettai, Murugankuruchi, Market, Samathanapuram, Kamarajar Nagar, Rahmathnagar, Perumalpuram, Maharaja nagar, High Grounds, VM Chatram and KTC Nagar and posh town called Santhi Nagar out of which Vannarpettai, Murugankurichi and Market are concentrated with largely commercial activities. There are also several other minor suburban areas which collectively contribute to the overall cityscape of Palayamkottai.

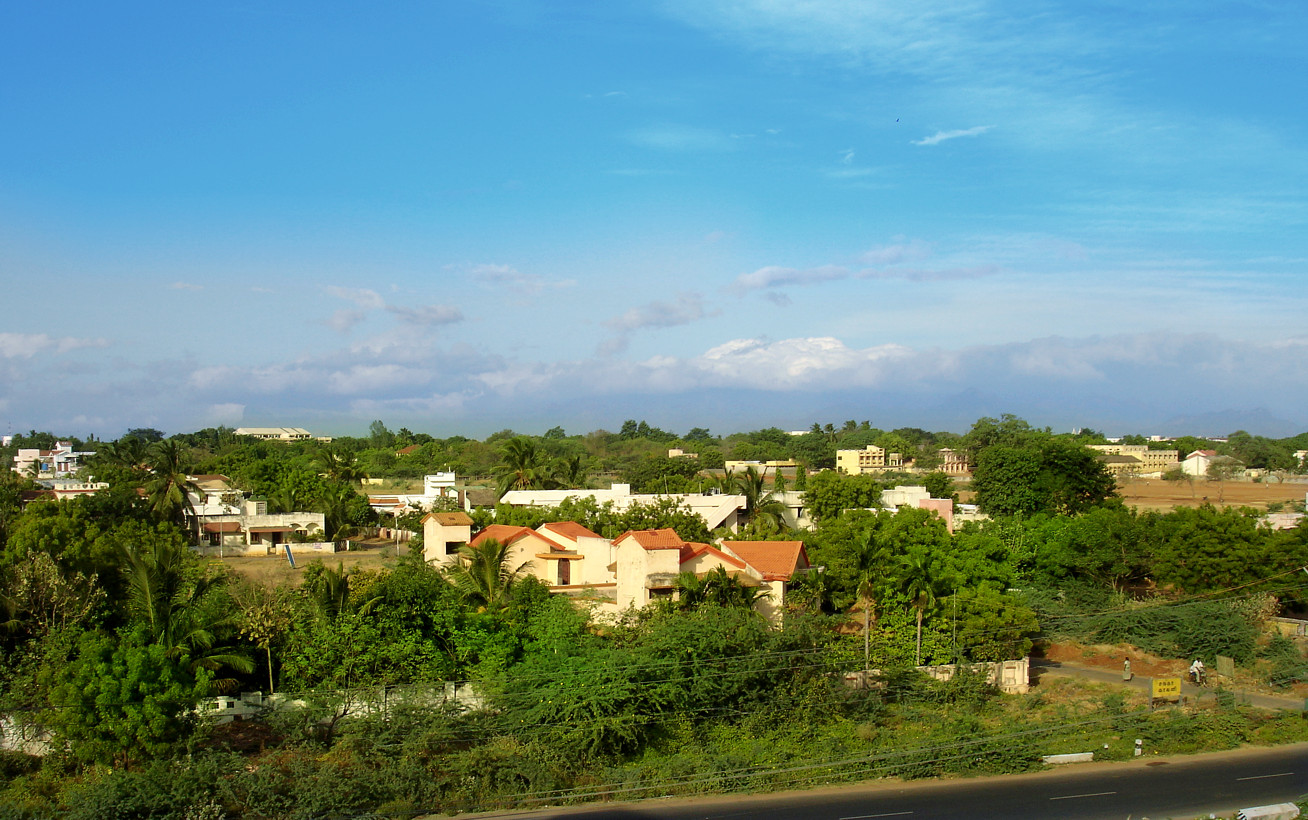
a typical residential area

The little city also has a Government Museum with a huge and realistic fibreglass Tyrannosaurus rex which is popular among the young people of Palayamkottai. The museum houses a small collection of ancient artifacts found in the areas surrounding the city. Some of its literary collections include ancient Tamil inscriptions in palm leaves.

Palayamkottai also has one of the most popular Science Centres in South India, a satellite unit of Visvesvaraya Industrial and Technological Museum, Bangalore. Since the Science Centre lies between Palayamkottai and Tirunelveli (the twin cities) and as it is difficult to mark a border between the two, it is often called as the Tirunelveli District Science Centre (by the district's name). It is a common hangout area for young people, and is frequently visited by teams of school students to explore and learn the principles of science through the centre's interesting outdoor equipment and experiments.

== Hospitals ==
Palayamkottai has many hospitals and other medical facilities. Among them, Our Lady's Hospital, founded nearly 50 years ago by a Belgian nun called Sister Delphine Bruyndonx, was and still remains one of Palayamkottai's popular hospitals for people who are poor or disadvantaged. Sister Delphine was popularly called the Teresa of Tirunelveli by all the people who knew her, because she had served this society since a time when it did not have any electricity.

CSI Bell Pins Mission Hospital and the recently renovated CSI Jeyaraj Annapackiam Hospital in Palayamkottai provide free and reduced cost medical services to the local community. The Tirunelveli Medical college Hospital - a tertiary referral center, located in the High Grounds provides free services to poor people. Palayamkottai also has a specialized kidney care centre and heart surgery centre. The city also has four blood banks.

Government Siddha Medical College is also located at Palayamkottai.

== Economy ==
There is a big market in central Palayamkottai, serviced by many bus routes. Also very popular among locals, is the Ulavar Santhai where farmers sell their products directly. The produce is very fresh and very cheap, and the market is usually very crowded in the morning with eager housewives exercising their haggling skills with the illiterate farmers. The success of the Ulavar Santhai market in Palayamkottai was under a deep speculation during the changing of governments. Now, with the ruling party DMK back in power, (which originally introduced the concept) the Ulavar Santhai is maintained well and is a grocery market for the locals.

Although there are not many supermarkets in Palayamkottai, there are practically all kinds of shops catering to the local people's needs.

== Public facilities ==
Palayamkottai also has a fire-fighting service which conducts camps in local schools annually. The postal service has a statue of Nandhis (mascot of the Indian Postal department) at the facade. It also has the post offices, police stations, big malls, markets, etc.

Palayamkottai has a jail called Palayamkottai Central Prison, which housed several eminent people during the pre-Independence era and afterwards. The Tamil language poet Subramanya Bharathi spent a part of his life here. The District Central Jail is notable for its large capacity and tight security. The prison is a popular landmark along the periphery of the city. Even the former Chief Minister, J.Jayalalitha (late) was thrice held in the Palayamkottai jail.

== Transportation ==
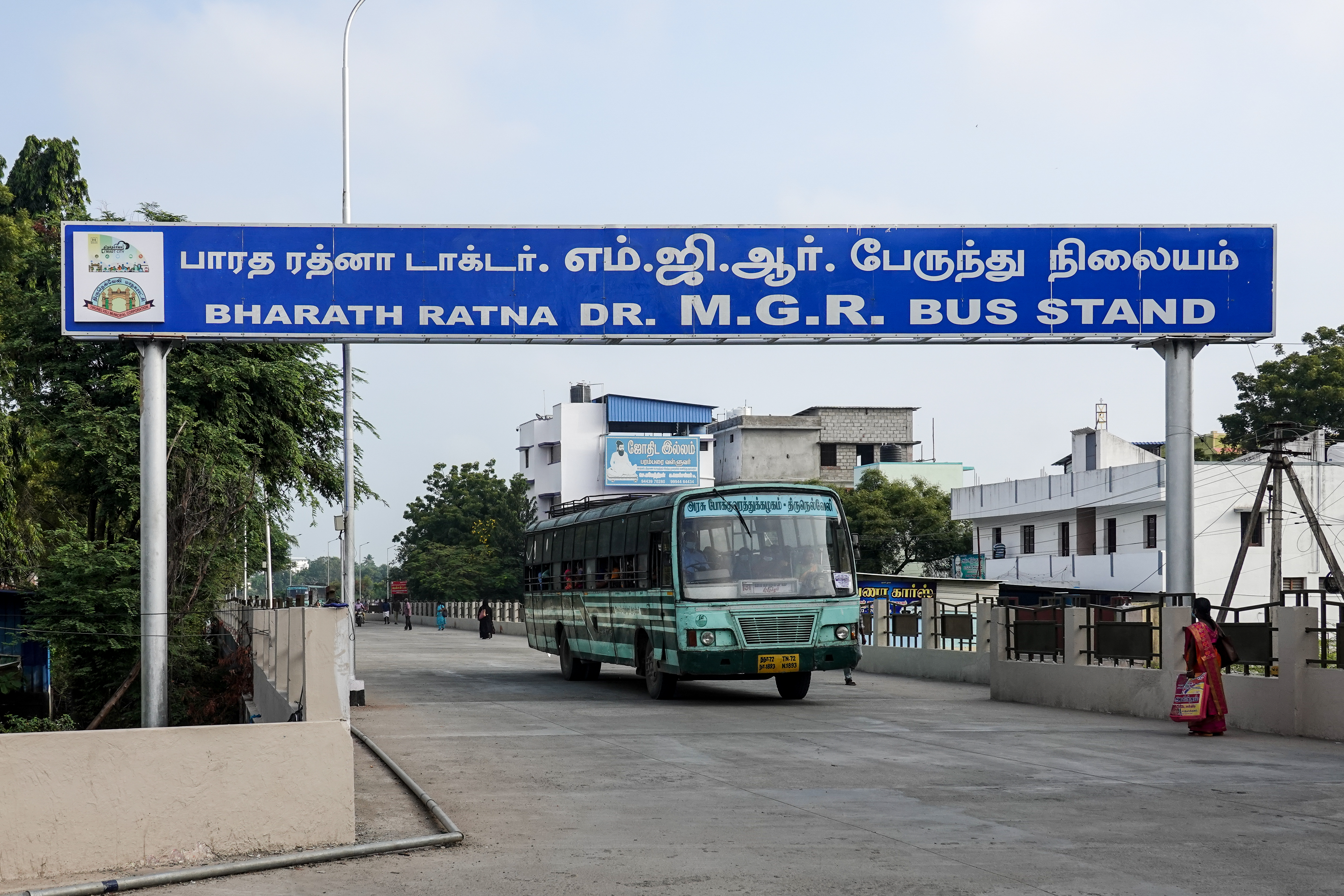
Entrance to Dr. MGR Bus Stand

Palayamkottai Bus Stand, or Palai Bus Stand as it is popularly called by the locals, was the major connecting hub of the City bus network. In 2003, the then Chief minister J.Jayalalithaa inaugurated a major new bus terminal, the Bharat Ratna Dr. MGR Bus Stand, for Tirunelveli in Veinthankulam on Tiruvananthapuram High Road. The new bus terminal connects Palayamkottai and Tirunelveli in an extensive network of neighbouring towns, cities and also the major metropolitan cities of Chennai, Bangalore and Hyderabad. The Palayamkottai bus terminal is also a major stopover for all buses going to Kanyakumari and Nagercoil. There are also numerous connections between the local Palayamkottai bus-stops and Tirunelveli town.

Share-autos (autorickshaws that car-pool paying customers on a common route) ply extensively along Palayamkottai's streets and are easy to flag down. The regular yellow-black Greaves Garuda autorickshaws, although plenty in number, are considered to be the common man's taxis of Palayamkottai. Autorickshaw drivers are known to overcharge tourists. Cars as taxis, are generally only available in taxi stands where tourists and locals use them to travel to short distances outside of the city. As a common practise, people of Palayamkottai or Tirunelveli do not use taxis as an alternate public transportation to buses or trains. Ola taxis have gained popularity with other private taxis as they are cheap than autos.

Nearest Air Port

Nearest airports

- Domestic Airport

Tuticorin Airport (IATA: TCR, ICAO: VOTK) .

- International Airport
1. Madurai Airport (IATA: IXM, ICAO: VOMD) .
2. Thiruvananthapuram International Airport (IATA: TRV, ICAO: VOTV) .

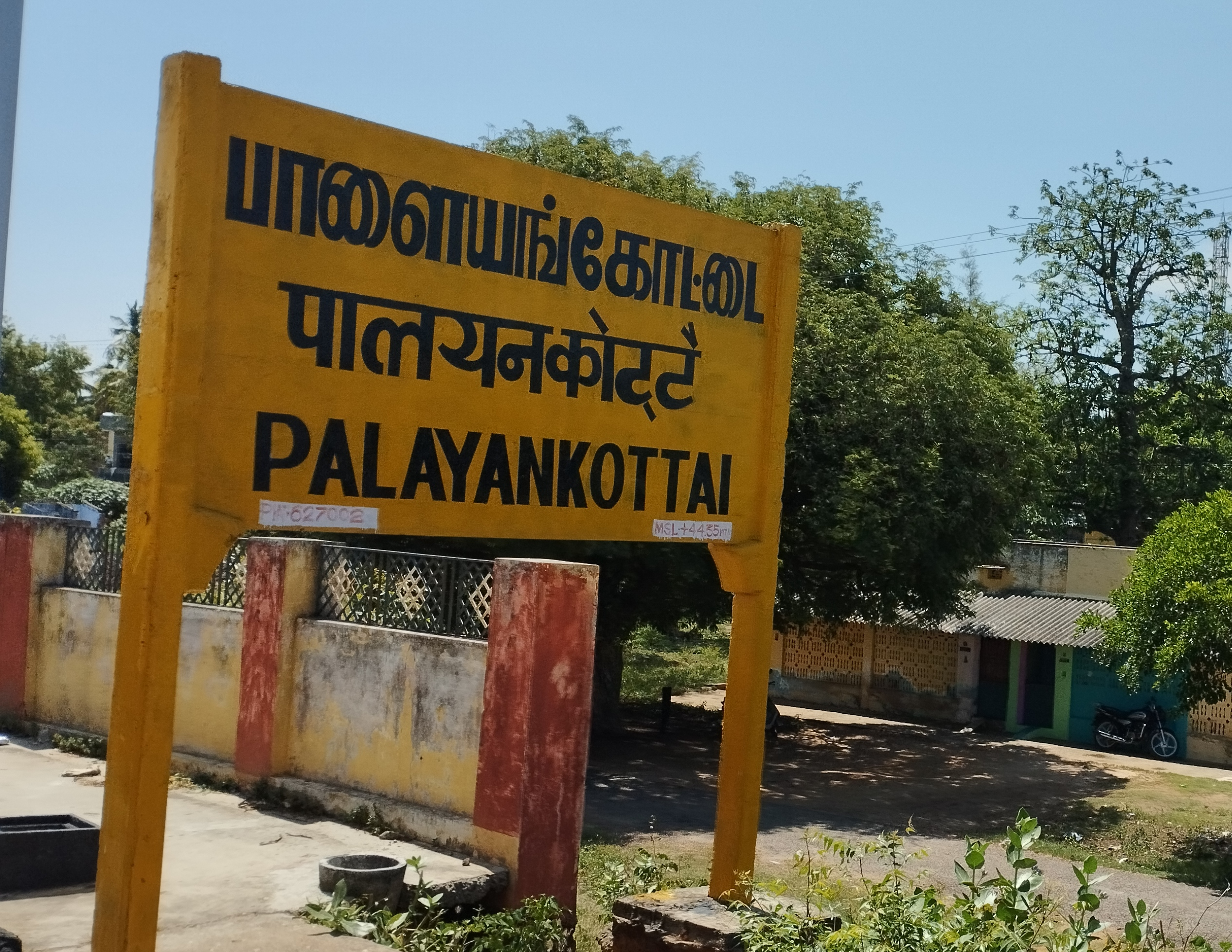
Palayamkottai railway station

Railway Transport

Palayamkottai also has a railway station on the Tirunelveli Junction to Tiruchendur Junction lines

Station code: PCO Station Location: Palayamkottai Zone Southern Railway

== Education ==
=== Schools ===
Most schools in Palayamkottai were founded by the Christian missionaries almost a hundred years ago. Schools like St.Xavier's Hr.Sec. School, St. John's Higher Secondary School, MDT Hindu College Higher Secondary School and Schafter High School have roughly 12,000 boys altogether, M.N. Abdur Rahman Higher Secondary School, High Ground, Cathedral Hr. Sec. School is located in the heart of the city under the shadow of the Holy Trinity Cathedral Church. Girls Schools like Mary Sargent Higher Secondary School, St. Ignatius' Convent Higher Secondary School and Sarah Tucker Hr. Sec School have over 10,000 girls enrolled. These girls' schools are very popular for their strict code of conduct. It is mostly these institutions that employ the large teaching community of Palayamkottai.

Rosemary matriculation higher secondary school, Pushpalatha vidya mandir (CBSE), Chinmaya vidhyalaya, Jeyandara saraswathi swamigal school at maharajanagar, Magdalene high school, Bell international school, IIPE Matric Hr.Sec. are some schools.

Palayamkottai has schools for the blind, deaf and mentally handicapped children. These organizations are predominantly run by the Tirunelveli Diocese of Church of South India, and are:

- Askwith School for the Visually Handicapped
- Florence Swainson School for the Hearing Impaired
- Bishop Sargent School for the Mentally Retarded

=== Colleges ===
Soon after completing Higher Secondary education, most young people opt for a college education right within the city.

Medial Colleges

- Tirunelveli Medical College
- Govt. Siddha Medical College;

Engineering Colleges

- Government Engineering College
- Francis Xavier Engineering College

Law College

- Government Law College, Tirunelveli

Arts and Science colleges

- St. John's College

St.John's College – Palayamkottai, Tirunelveli Established in 1844 by Church Missionary Society. In 1878, it got affiliated by Madars University as second grade college.

- St. Xavier's College, Palayamkottai

St.Xavier's College recently celebrated its 150th anniversary of the Jesuit Priests who founded the great institution. The college has also opened up a new library in 2005 with many modern amenities. The campus also has halls of residences for its large number of resident students. St. Xavier's College of Education and St.John's College are the other xavier institutes with an age restriction for admission, similar to most other colleges in India.

- Sadakathullah Appa College
- MDT Hindu College
- Sarah Tucker College (STC), most of these being over 100 years old.

Sarah Tucker College, established in 1895 by the Church Missionary Society, was the first college for women in South India. It is named after Ms.Sarah Tucker, a physically challenged lady confined to her room in England, who was moved by the reports of the appalling condition of the women in this region due to their illiteracy. She stepped in with a crusading spirit to provide education and uplift them. This girls-only college has over eleven departments of education today.

== Sports ==
Palayamkottai has many playgrounds filled with hyperactive young cricketers. Palayamkottai has two major public playgrounds: the "VOC maithanam" and the "Anna Stadium". Grand celebrations during the Republic day and Independence day are conducted by various schools in the VOC ground. State Level Hockey tournaments sponsored by Bell Pins are held in VOC grounds annually. A park and an indoor stadium has been built here in this ground, in order to cover the small children and youngsters. The Anna Stadium holds field hockey and Kabbadi matches at both district and state level. The stadium has an excellent professional German Hockey Turf, which trains a lot of young and energetic teams and Sports Development Authority of Tamil Nadu (SDAT) has recently released tenders for installation of synthetic athletic track in it. The stadium also houses a well maintained swimming pool.
