= Palam Kalyanasundaram =

Indian philanthropist and social worker

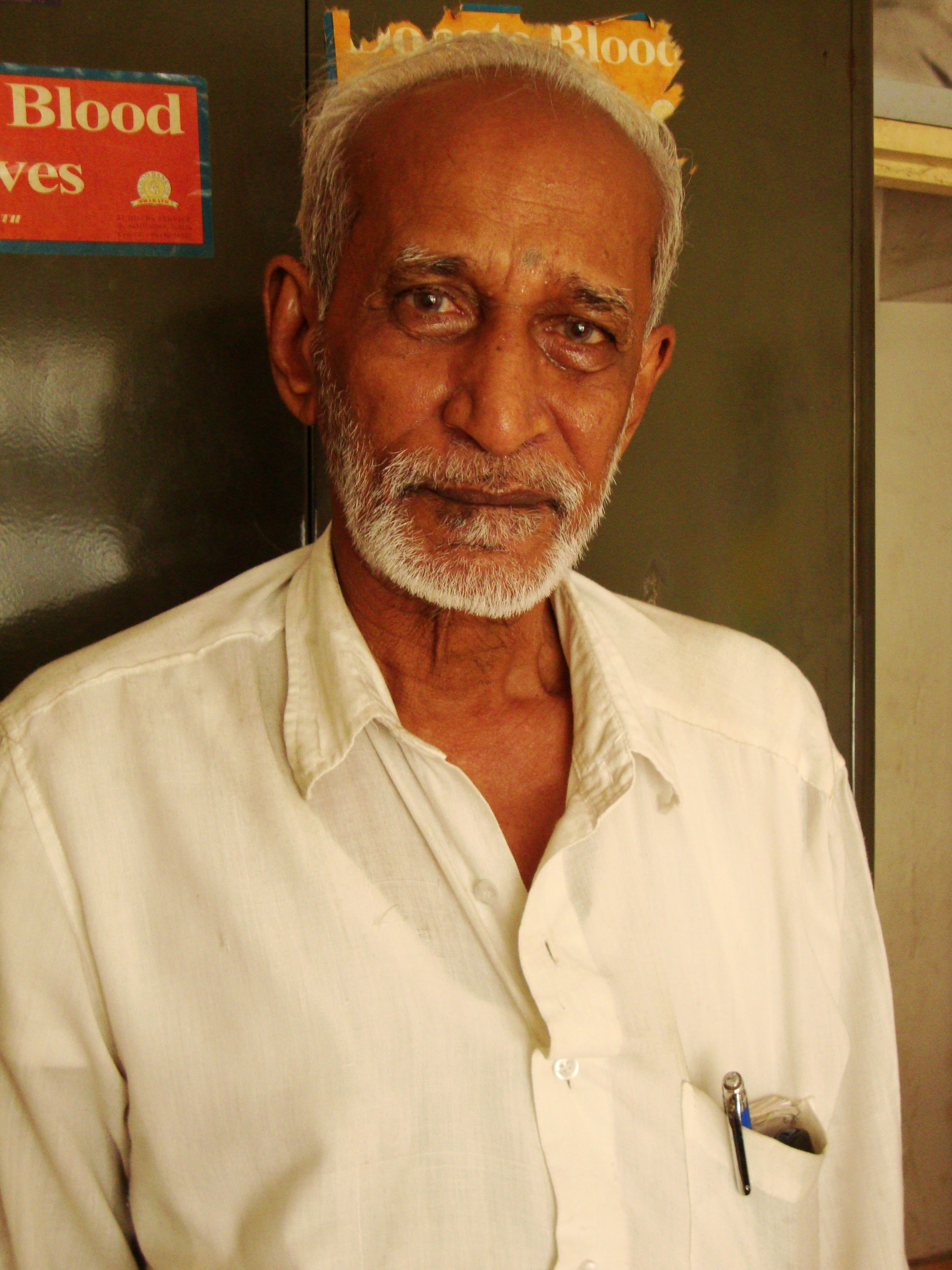
- Born: August 1940 (age 85); Melakarivelamkulam, Tirunelveli district, Tamil Nadu, India
- Education: Master of Arts (Literature); Master of Arts (History); Gold Medalist in Library Science, University of Madras
- Occupations: Librarian (retired); Philanthropist; Social worker
- Organization: Paalam
- Known for: Philanthropy, Social service
- Awards: Padma Shri (2023)

Palam Kalyanasundaram (born c. August 1940) is an Indian librarian, philanthropist, and social worker from Tamil Nadu, India. He is known for his extensive charitable work, having reportedly donated all his earnings, including his salary throughout his 35-year career as a librarian, his pension, and numerous cash awards, to charitable causes. He was awarded the Padma Shri, India's fourth-highest civilian honor, in 2023 in the field of social work.

== Early life and education ==
Palam Kalyanasundaram was born in August 1940 in Melakarivelamkulam village in the Tirunelveli district of Tamil Nadu, India. He lost his father when he was a child, and was raised by his mother, Thaayammal.

Kalyanasundaram pursued higher education at the University of Madras, where he earned a gold medal in Library Science. He also holds Master of Arts degrees in Literature and History. His interest in Tamil literature led the founder of MTT Hindu College to introduce the subject and sponsor his education.

== Career and philanthropy ==
Kalyanasundaram worked as a librarian for 35 years at the Kumarkurupara Arts College in Srivaikuntam, Thoothukudi district, retiring in 1998. A significant aspect of his philanthropic journey was the decision to donate all his earnings. During the 1962 Sino-Indian War, he donated his gold chain to the war fund, an act acknowledged and felicitated by the then Chief Minister of Tamil Nadu, K. Kamaraj.

Upon retirement, Kalyanasundaram also donated his pension arrears of ₹10 lakh (US$10,000). He is also reported to have donated prize money from various awards, including a sum of ₹30 crore (US$3.1 million) that he received with a 'Man of the Millennium' award from some unidentified American organisation.

Kalyanasundaram founded the Paalam (meaning "bridge" in Tamil) organization in 1998 after his retirement. The organization acts as a conduit, connecting donors with those in need and facilitating various social welfare activities.

== Awards and recognition ==
- Padma Shri (2023)
- Man of the Millennium, from some American organisation
- Best Librarian in India (1990), from the Government of India.
- The United Nation Organization (UNO) has honoured him as "One of the Outstanding People of the 20th centuary". url=https://princh.com/blog-librarian-of-the-millennium/

== Personal life and legacy ==
Kalyanasundaram lives in Saidapet, Chennai, and remains unmarried. He has pledged his body and eyes to the Tirunelveli Medical College for medical research and donation after his death.
