= Tirunelveli =

- City
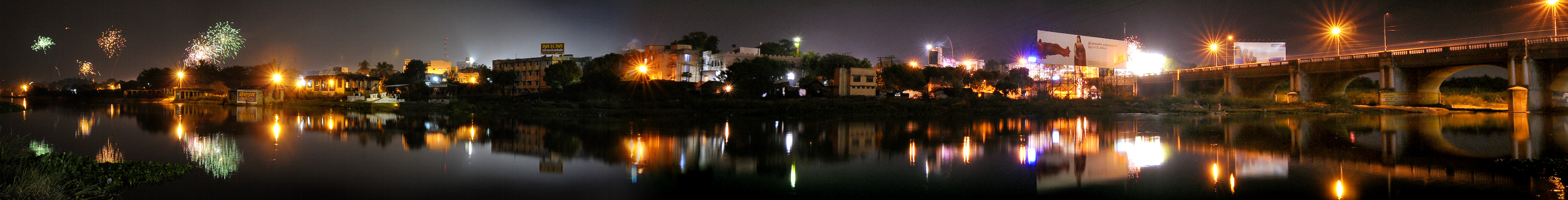
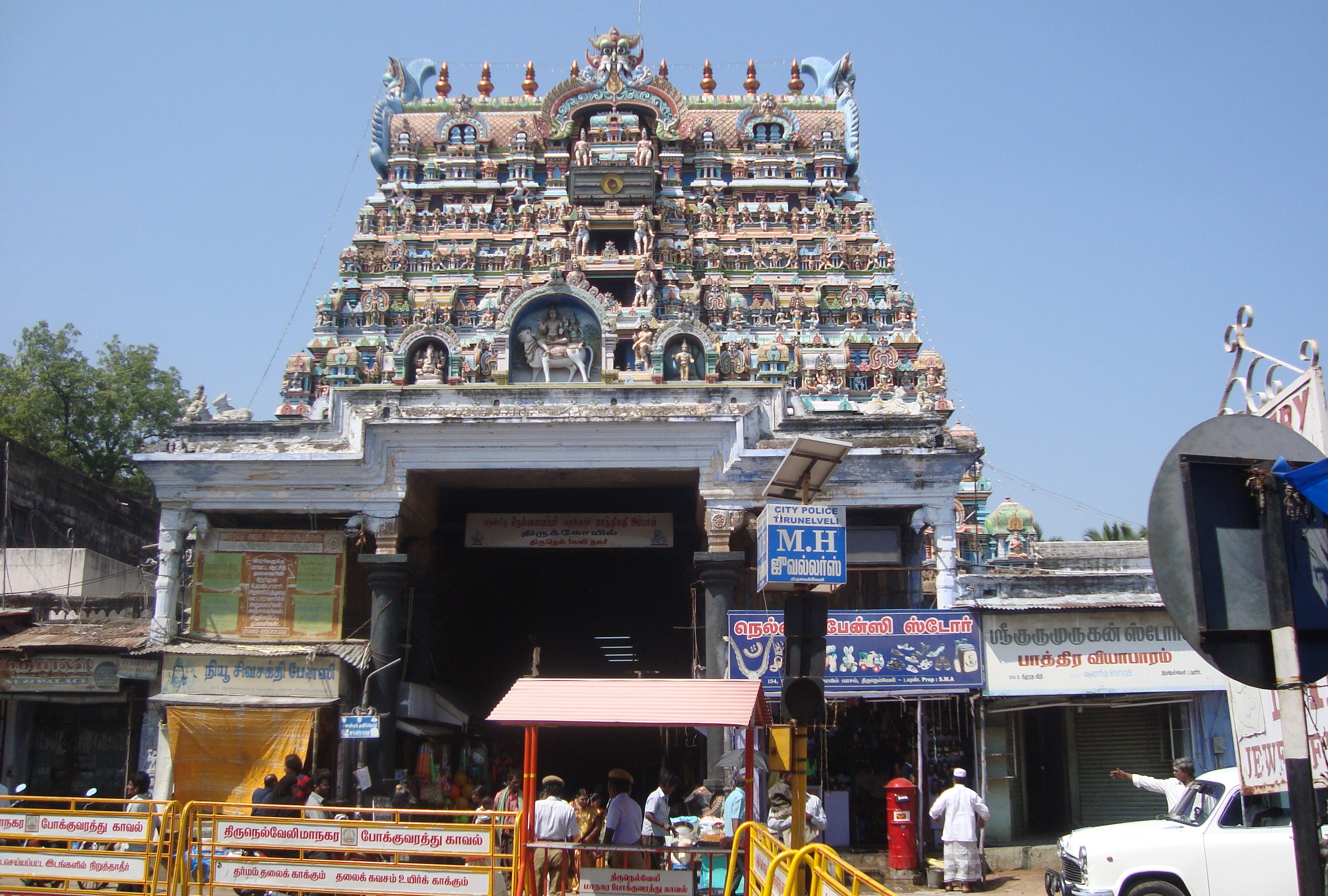
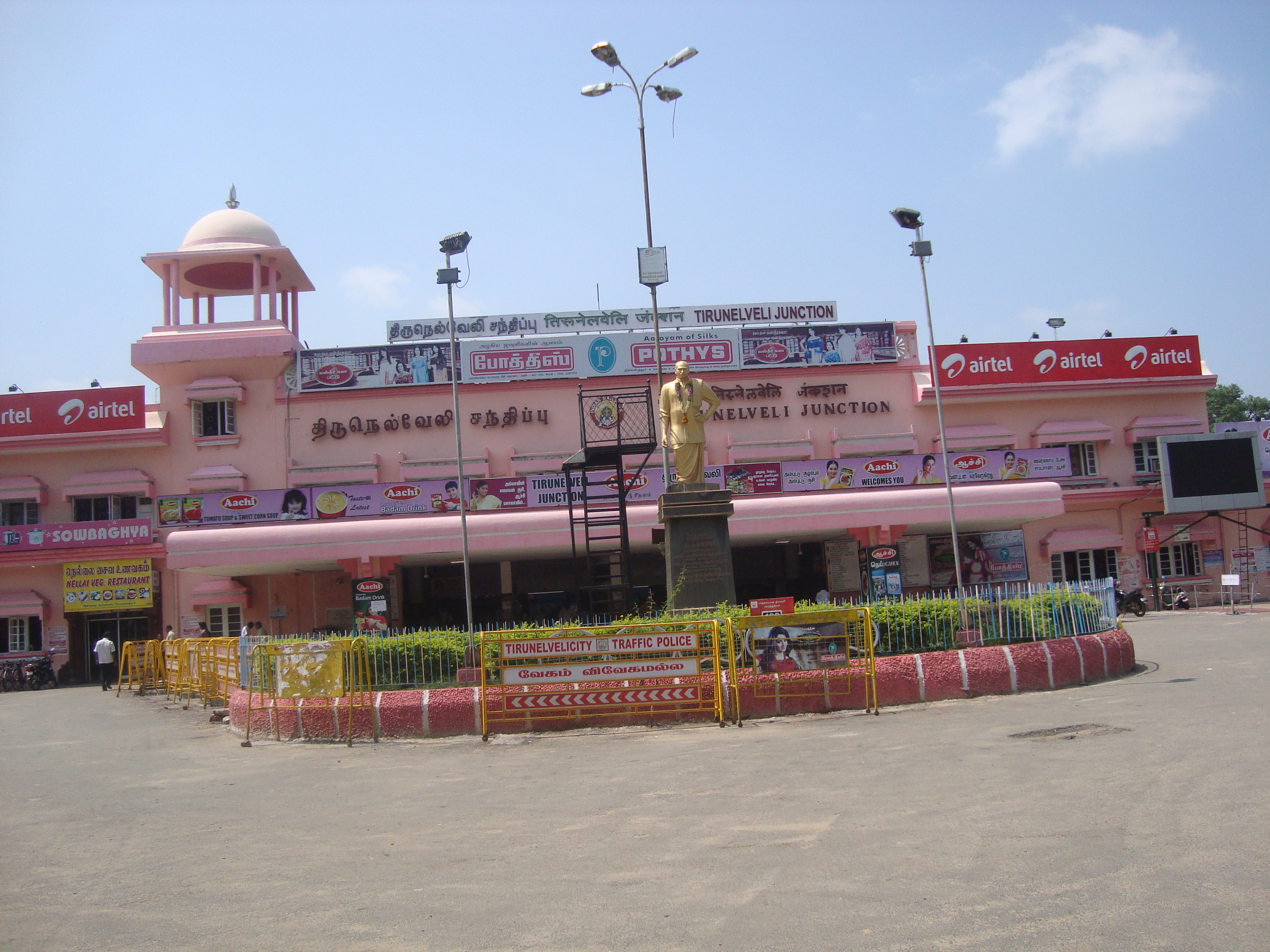
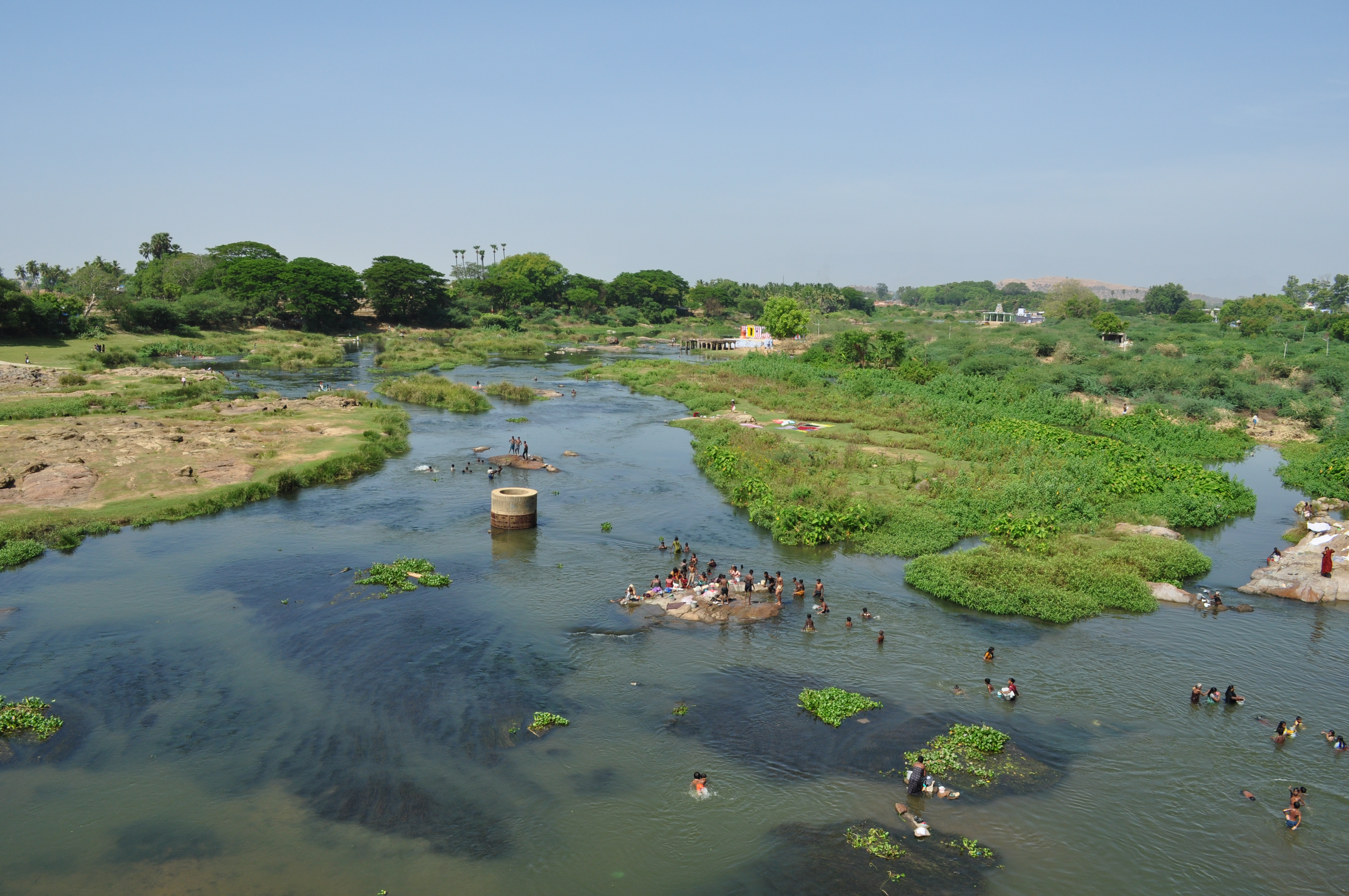
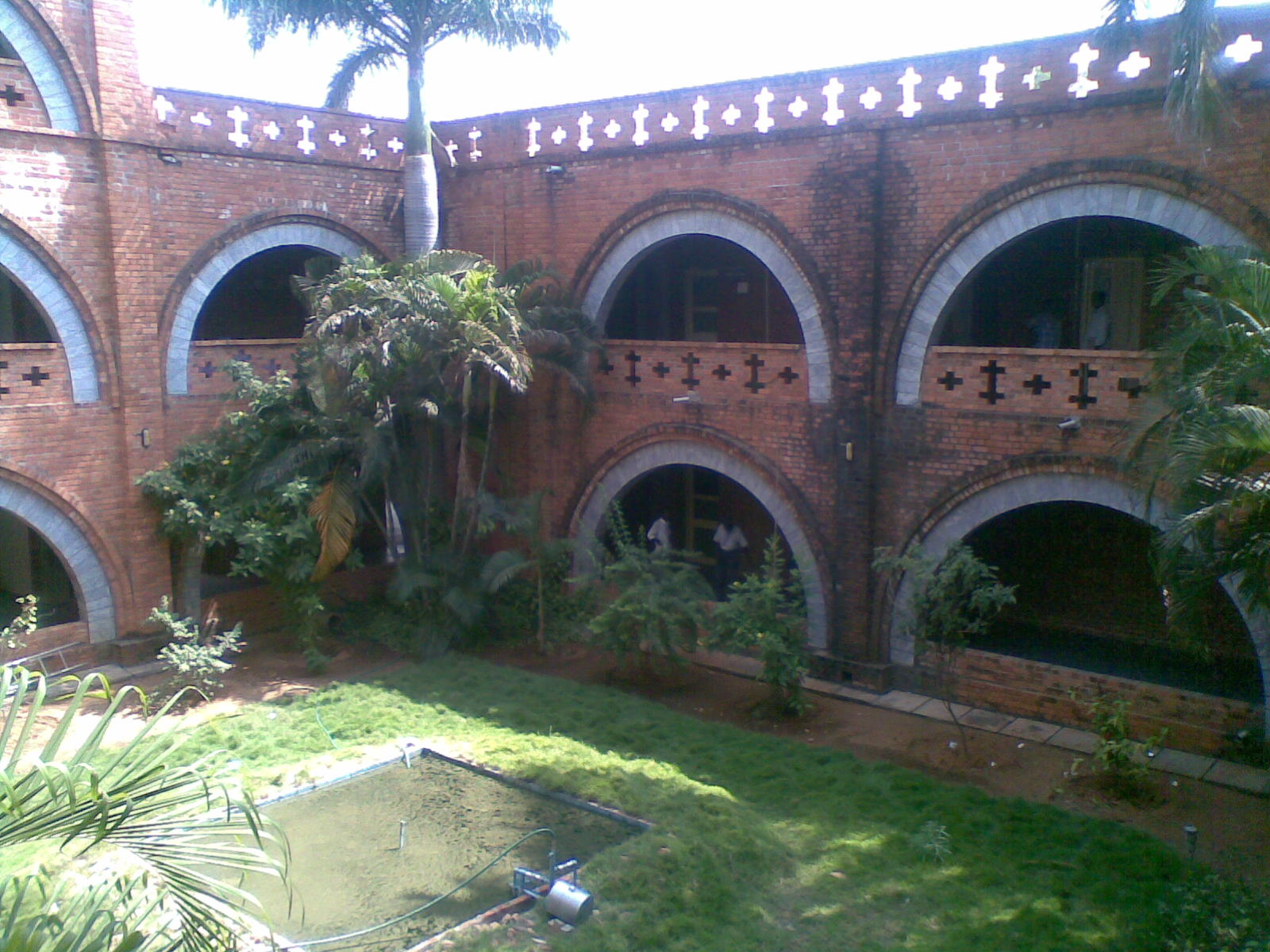
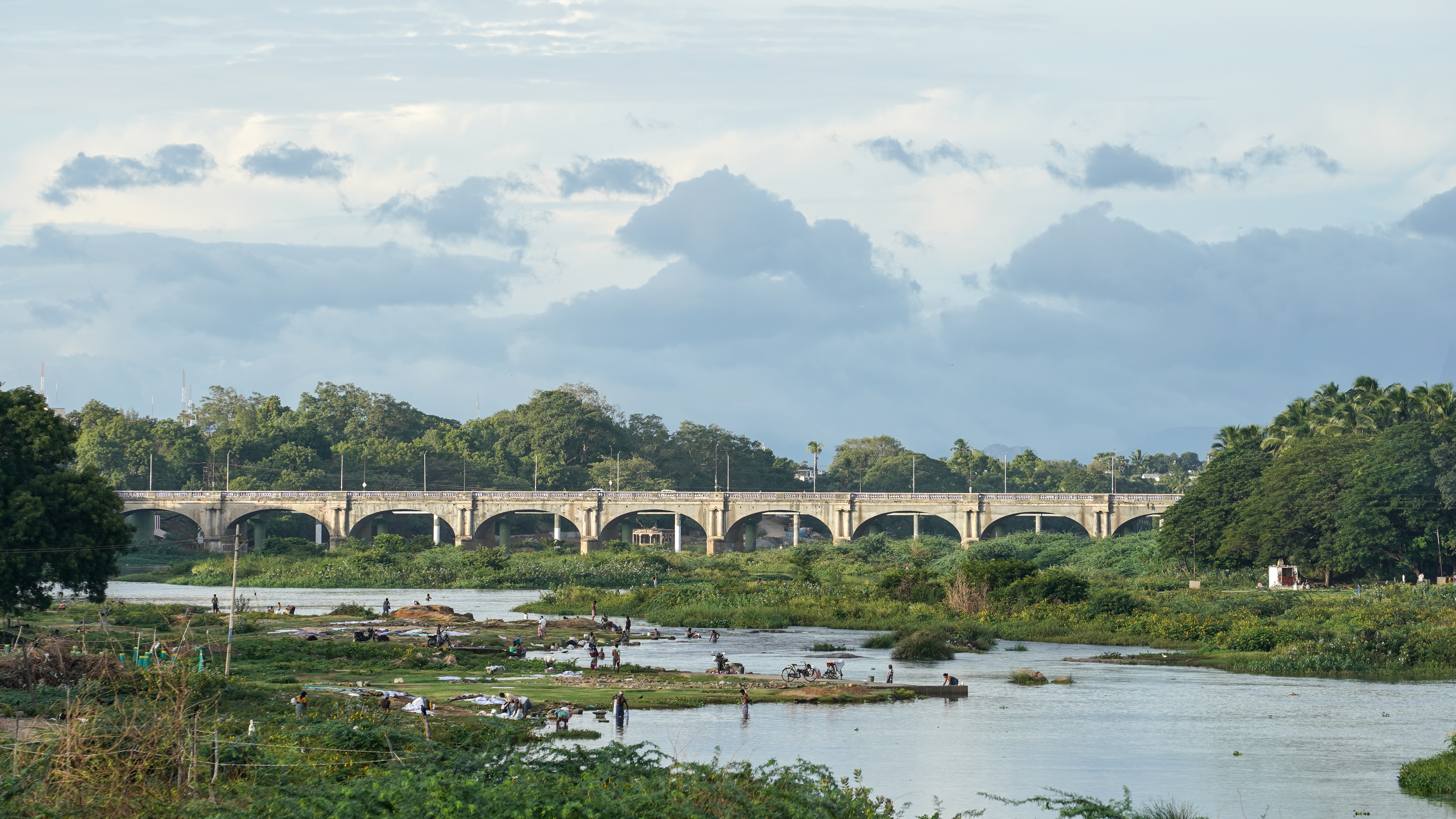
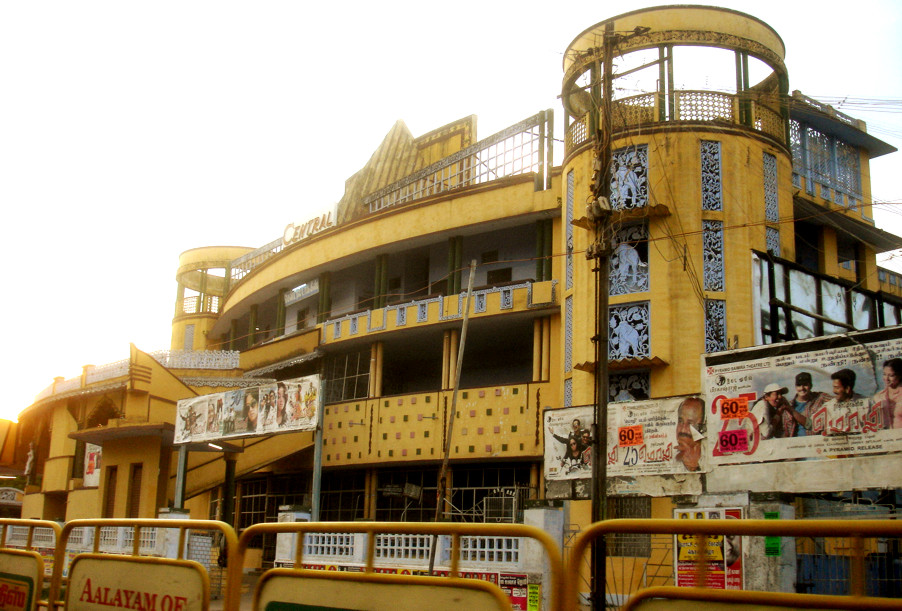
- City skyline Nellaiappar Temple Tirunelveli Junction Thamirabarani River Manonmaniam Sundaranar University Sulochana Mudaliar Bridge Central Theatre
- Nickname: Oxford of South India
- Tirunelveli, Tamil Nadu Tirunelveli (India)
- Coordinates: 8°42′49″N 77°45′24″E
- Country: India
- State: Tamil Nadu
- Region: Pandya Nadu
- District: Tirunelveli

Government
  - Type: Municipal Corporation
  - Body: Tirunelveli City Municipal Corporation

Area
  - City: 189.9 km^{2} (73.3 sq mi)
  - Rank: 3
- Elevation: 73 m (240 ft)

Population (2011)
  - City: 473,637
  - Rank: 7th in Tamil Nadu
  - Density: 2,494/km^{2} (6,460/sq mi)
  - Metro: 498,924
- Demonym(s): Tirunelvelian, Nellaikaran

Languages
  - Official: English, Tamil
- Time zone: UTC+5:30 (IST)
- Pin Codes: 627xx
- Telephone code: 91 (0)462
- Vehicle registration: TN 72
- Website: tirunelveli.nic.in

Tirunelveli (Tamil: [tiɾɯnelʋeːli]), (Note: Anglicised as Tinnevelly during the British Raj) also known as Nellai, is a city and municipal corporation in the Indian state of Tamil Nadu. It is located on the southern part of the state, on the west bank of the Thamirabarani River. It is the administrative headquarters of the Tirunelveli District. As per the 2011 census, it had a population of 473,637 individuals, and was the seventh-largest city in the state by population.

Tirunelveli has a recorded history dating back to more than two thousand years. It served as a major town during the reign of the Early Pandyas in the Sangam period (3rd century BCE to 3rd century CE). It came under the rule of the Cholas in the 11th century CE. The region was ruled by the Later Pandyas, the Vijayanagara Empire, and the Madurai Nayaks in the late Middle Ages. It came under the influence of the British East India Company in the late 18th century, and the Tinnevelly district was formed on 1 September 1790. In the Polygar War, Palaiyakkarars led by Veerapandiya Kattabomman fought the forces of the Company, on the outskirts of the city from 1797 to 1801. It came under the British Raj in the 19th century, and later became part of the Madras Province of Independent India in 1947.

Tirunelveli is administered by the Tirunelveli Municipal Corporation, which was established on 1 June 1994. The city covers an area of 189.9 km^{2} (73.3 sq mi). It is well-connected by road and rail with the rest of the state. The economy of the city is dependent on agriculture and its allied industries, services including education, and information technology, manufacturing including tobacco products, cement, and bricks, and textiles. There are several wind power generation farms located in the outskirts of the city. The city serves an educational hub of the region, and is home to several institutions.

Tirunelveli has a number of historical monuments, with the Nellaiappar Temple being the most prominent. The city is renowned for the sweet of 'Irutu kadai halva'.

== Etymology ==
The inscriptions at the Nellaiappar Temple mention that Shiva (as Vrihivriteswara) descended to the Earth and took the form of a hedge to save the paddy crop of a devotee. As per the earlier practice of naming settlements based on the vegetation prevalent in the areas of worship, the place was known as 'Venu vanam' (bamboo forest) due to the presence of bamboo where the deity is believed to have appeared. Derived from the story in the Hindu mythology, 'Tirunelveli' is a combination of three Tamil words–'thiru', 'nel', and 'veli', meaning sacred, paddy, and hedge respectively. The seventh-century Saiva canonical work Tevaram mentions the town as 'Thirunelveli'. The town was called Tirunelveli Seemai during the late Middle Ages, with 'seemai' meaning town in Tamil. It was anglicised as 'Tinnelvelly' during the British Raj, and was officially named Tirunelveli after the Indian independence.

== History ==
Tirunelveli was part of the Pandian Empire, references to which are present in the Sangam literature, and inscriptions dating back to the 3rd century BCE. The region came under the rule of the Cholas in the 11th century CE. It remained under the control of the Cholas until the early 13th century CE, when the Pandyas re-established control over the region, and ruled with Madurai as the capital. During the 13th and 14th centuries, Tirunelveli was the secondary capital of Pandimandalam, the country ruled by the Pandyas.

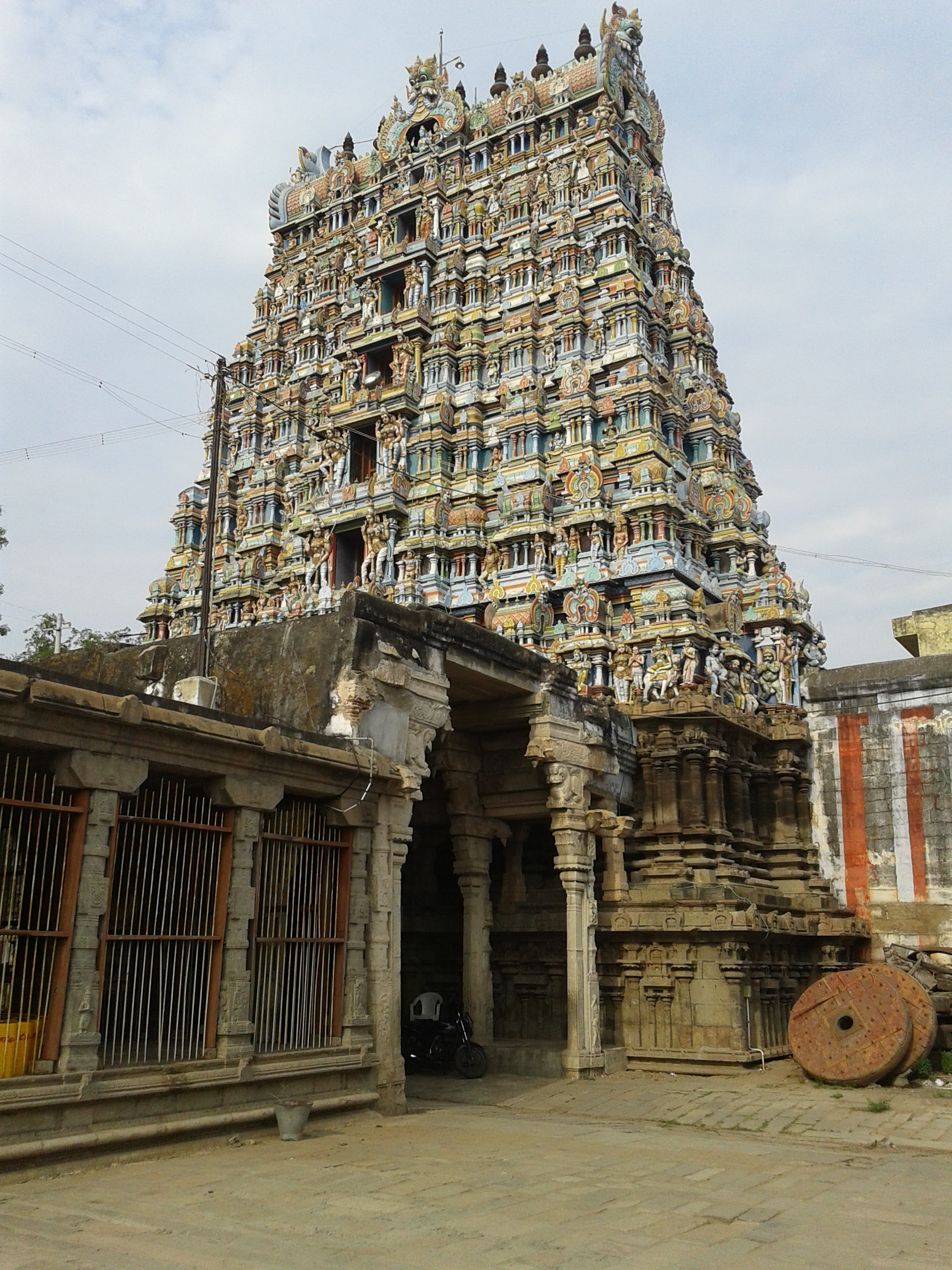
The Nellaiappar Temple was built by the Later Pandyas

The Nellaiappar temple was the royal shrine of the later Pandyas, and the city benefited from extensive irrigation facilities were developed based on the Thamirabarani River. The Vijayanagara Empire occupied the region in the 15th century CE. During the Vijayanagara rule, Brahmin and Vellalar chieftains held rights over community lands ('kani') in the Thamirabarani valley, while Maravar and Shanar migrants settled around the region. The Maravars populated the western foothills, the Kannadigas and Telugus settled on the eastern dry tracts of land. In the 16th century CE, the region was ruled by the Madurai Nayaks, and Tirunelveli served as the subsidiary capital of the Nayak territory. The city was rebuilt extensively during the reign of Viswanatha Nayak (1529–64), who also developed several temples in the region.

The region briefly came under the control of Nawabs of Arcot after they defeated the Marathas in 1743 CE. However, during the time, the palaiyakkarars, who were originally military governors under the Nayak rule, held control over the lands. In the middle of the 18th century, the British East India Company began to establish control over the lands in the region. Between the 15th and 18th centuries, Tirunelveli became a major economic center in the region, with migration of people to the city. During the 18th century, the town was often called as Nellai Cheemai, with 'Cheemai' meaning 'foreign town'.

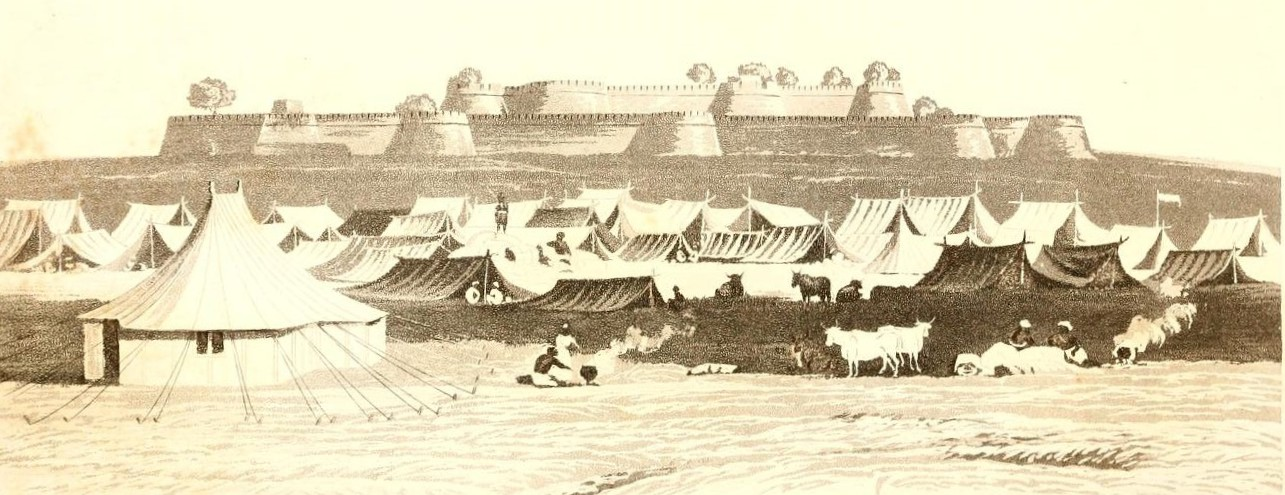
Polygar Wars were fought between the Palaiyakkarars, the local chieftains and the British East India Company

Though the British restored some order in 1755 CE, the palaiyakkarars, who had built massive forts, and held their own armies, continued to fight with the British. Briefly, the British had its troops in the region, while the palaiyakkarars managed the territory on behalf of the Nawabs. However, the palaiyakkarars later continued to engage in skirmishes with the British. This culminated in the Polygar Wars, in which a group of palaiyakkarars, led by Veerapandiya Kattabomman, fought against the British, who were also aided by some of the palaiyakkarars. Kattabomman was defeated and hanged, and eventually the region came under the complete control of the British in 1801 CE.

Tinnevelly district was established on 1 September 1790, with Tinnevelly serving as the headquarters of the district. The history of Palayamkottai, which housed the old fort built by the palaiyakkarars, served as a garrison. Tirunelveli was part of the Madras Presidency during the British Raj. After Indian independence, it became part of the Madras Province, which later became the Madras State in 1950, and Tamil Nadu in 1969.

== Geography ==
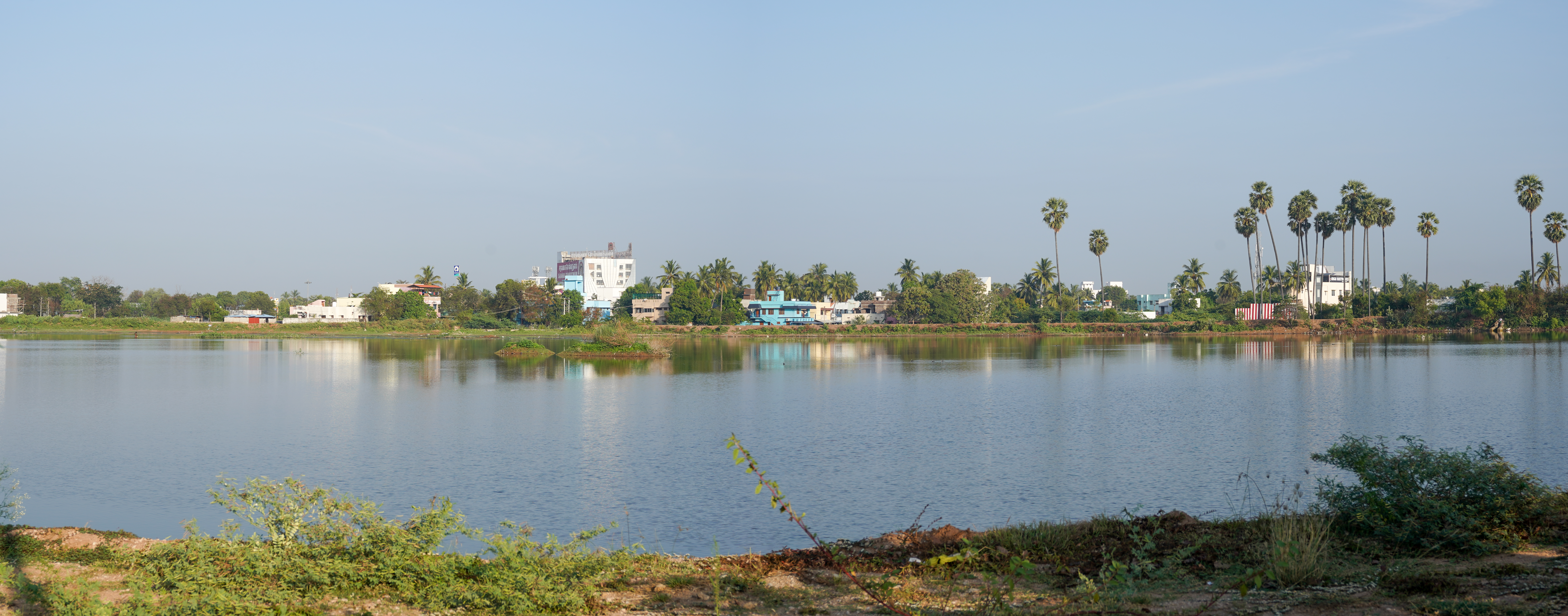
Veinthan Kulam

Tirunelveli is situated in the southern tip of the Indian peninsula. It is located on the west bank of the Tamirabarani river, with Palayamkottai located on the other side. The river is the major water source of the city, and is fed by the monsoons. There are several small lakes and ponds in the city.

=== Geology and vegetation ===
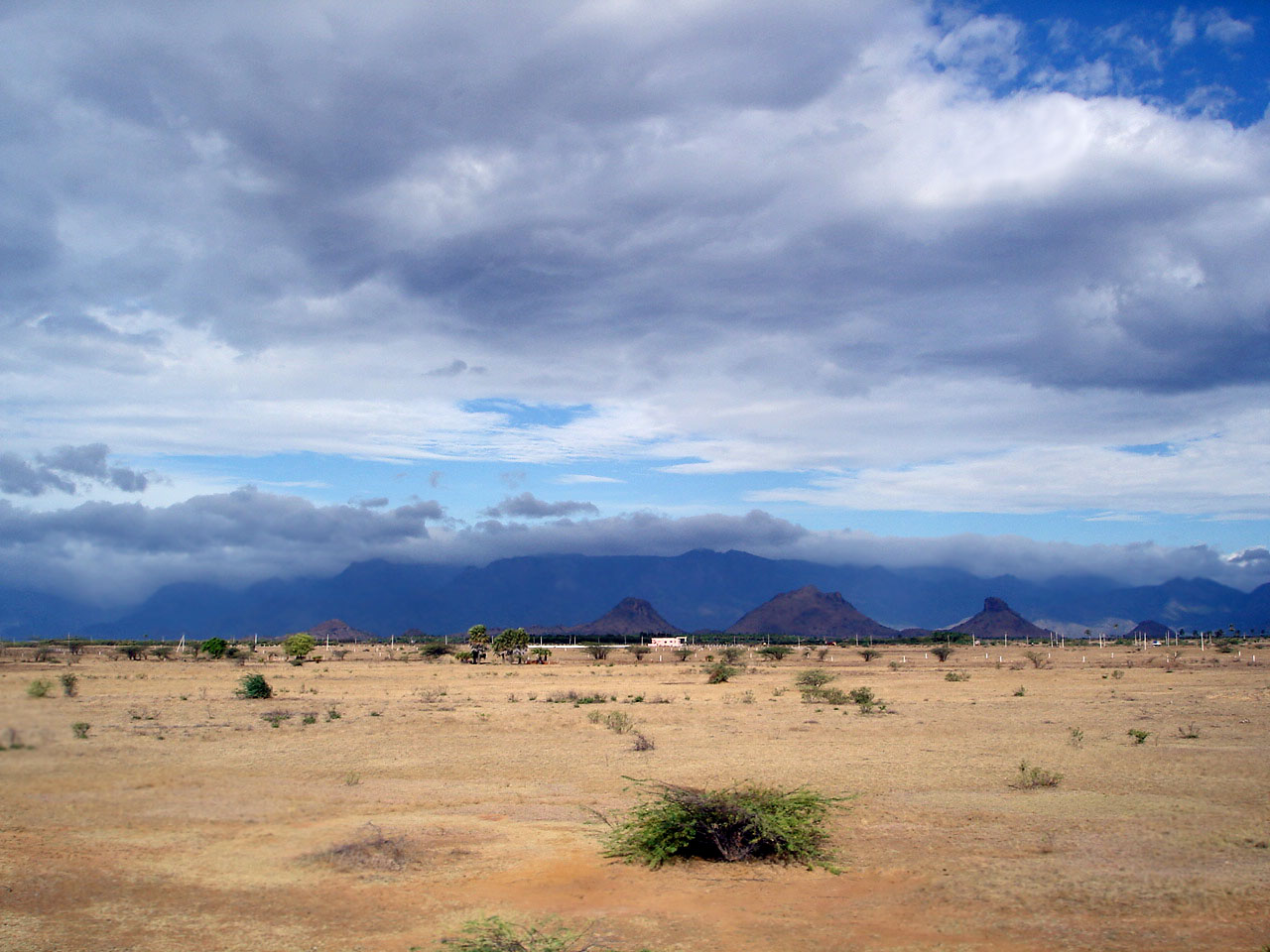
Agasthiyamalai hills block the southwest monsoon, creating a rainshadow region.

The region is composed mainly of gneiss rocks, and consists of red sand, accumulated by the effect of wind blowing from the Agasthiyamalai hills to the east. There is a thin strip of alluvial soil along the banks of the Tamirabarani river, and stretches of black soil to the north, which support paddy and cotton respectively. Pineapples, chili, and tobacco were introduced during the late 16th century and potatoes during the early 17th century. The most common tree is the palm, with other trees in the region include bamboo, teak, kadambu, vengai, pillai maruthu, kari maruthu, and jack fruit.

=== Climate ===
Tirunelveli has a equable climate with less rainfall, and influenced by both northeast and southwest monsoon. The Agasthiyamalai hills, which is part of the Western Ghats, lie to the west of the town, and blocks the southwest monsoon winds, causing a rainshadow region to the east. The mean maximum temperature during summer (March to June) averages 35 °C (95 °F), and touches 38 °C (100 °F) during the hottest period in May. In the winter (December to January), the temperature rarely drops below 25 °C (77 °F), with an average minimum of 22 °C (72 °F) during the coldest days. The southwest monsoon brings cool winds, and mild rainfall in the second part of June, with maximum precipitation occurs during the northeast monsoon (October–December). The average annual rainfall is 890 mm (35 in).

Climate data for Palayamkottai, 1991–2020, extremes 1947–present
Month	Jan	Feb	Mar	Apr	May	Jun	Jul	Aug	Sep	Oct	Nov	Dec	Year
Record high °C (°F)	36.0 (96.8)	39.0 (102.2)	41.7 (107.1)	42.0 (107.6)	42.8 (109.0)	44.9 (112.8)	41.9 (107.4)	40.4 (104.7)	40.5 (104.9)	41.0 (105.8)	38.9 (102.0)	37.0 (98.6)	44.9 (112.8)
Mean daily maximum °C (°F)	31.5 (88.7)	33.4 (92.1)	35.3 (95.5)	36.3 (97.3)	37.5 (99.5)	36.1 (97.0)	34.8 (94.6)	35.0 (95.0)	35.6 (96.1)	33.6 (92.5)	30.9 (87.6)	30.3 (86.5)	34.1 (93.4)
Mean daily minimum °C (°F)	22.5 (72.5)	23.1 (73.6)	24.0 (75.2)	25.6 (78.1)	26.3 (79.3)	26.4 (79.5)	26.2 (79.2)	25.9 (78.6)	25.6 (78.1)	24.7 (76.5)	23.7 (74.7)	22.8 (73.0)	24.7 (76.5)
Record low °C (°F)	18.0 (64.4)	18.0 (64.4)	18.4 (65.1)	20.3 (68.5)	16.3 (61.3)	20.4 (68.7)	19.3 (66.7)	21.6 (70.9)	19.5 (67.1)	17.9 (64.2)	16.9 (62.4)	17.6 (63.7)	16.9 (62.4)
Average rainfall mm (inches)	14.0 (0.55)	19.3 (0.76)	31.9 (1.26)	64.7 (2.55)	56.2 (2.21)	9.9 (0.39)	11.9 (0.47)	34.5 (1.36)	45.1 (1.78)	161.4 (6.35)	217.0 (8.54)	96.2 (3.79)	762.0 (30.00)
Average rainy days	1.7	1.4	2.1	3.6	3.0	1.2	0.9	1.9	3.0	7.7	10.6	5.6	42.7
Average relative humidity (%) (at 17:30 IST)	64	57	54	58	55	55	55	55	53	63	72	69	59
Source: India Meteorological Department

== Demographics ==
Religious census
Religion	Percent(%)
Hindu	69.0%
Muslim	20.0%
Christian	10.6%
Other	0.4%

According to 2011 census, Tirunelveli had a population of 473,637 individuals. The sex ratio was 1,027 females for every 1,000 males, much above the national average of 929. About 42,756 inhabitants were under the age of six. Scheduled Castes and Scheduled Tribes accounted for 13.17% and 0.32% of the population respectively. The average literacy was rate was 90.4% with a male literacy of 94.8% and female literacy 86.2%. The city had 120,466 households, and about 14.4% of the population resided in slums. There were a total of 182,471 workers, comprising 2,088 cultivators, 5,515 main agricultural labourers, 18,914 in house hold industries, 142,435 other workers, 13,519 marginal workers, 166 marginal cultivators, 913 marginal agricultural labourers, 1,828 marginal workers in household industries and 10,612 other marginal workers.

The city covers an area of 108.65 km^{2} (41.95 sq mi). The population density of the city was 3,781 persons per square kilometre in 2001, compared with 2,218 persons per square kilometre in 1971. According to provisional data from the 2011 census the Tirunelveli urban agglomeration had a population of 498,984 inhabitants, including 246,710 males and 252,274 females. As per the religious census of 2011, Hinduism was the predominant religion with 69% of the population adhering to it. Islam (20%) and Christianity (10.6%) formed significant minority of the population.

Tamil is the main language spoken in the city, with the use of English common in educational institutions and offices in the service sector. The Tamil dialect spoken in this region is distinct, and is widely spoken throughout the region.

== Administration and politics ==
Administration
Mayor	G. Ramakrishnan
Corporation Commissioner	Monika Rana
Commissioner of Police	Prassanna Kumar
Member of Parliament
Tirunelveli	C. Robert Bruce
Members of Legislative Assembly
Tirunelveli	Nainar Nagendran
Palayamkottai	M. Abdul Wahab

The Tirunelveli Municipality was established in 1866. It became a Municipal Corporation in 1994, by combining the Palayamkottai and Melapalayam municipalities, the Thachanallur town panchayat and eleven other village panchayats with the city. The municipal corporation has 55 wards divided across four zones–Melapalayam, Palayamkottai, Thatchanallur, and Tirunelveli. Each ward is represented by a councilor, who form part of the municipal council headed by a mayor. The administrative functions of the corporation are managed by a corporation commissioner. The corporation has six departments: general administration and personnel, engineering, revenue, public health, city planning and information technology.

Tirunelveli is part of the Tirunelveli and Palayamkottai assembly constituencies, which elect a member each to the Tamil Nadu Legislative Assembly every five years. The city is a part of the Tirunelveli Lok Sabha constituency. The All India Anna Dravida Munnetra Kazhagam has won the seat seven times, in 1977, three times consecutively from 1984 to 1991, 1998, and 1999, and 2014. The Indian National Congress has won the seat five times in 1957, 1962, 2004, 2009, and 2024. The Dravida Munnetra Kazhagam has won it thrice, in 1980, 1996, and 2019, and the Swantantra Party and Communist Party of India once each.

Law and order in the city is maintained by the Tirunelveli city division of the Tamil Nadu Police, headed by a Police commissioner. There are various units for prohibition enforcement, district crime, social justice and human rights, district crime records and a special branch operating at the district level, each headed by a Deputy Superintendent of Police.

== Economy ==
Tirunelveli is located in a strategic location, at the southern tip of the Indian mainland, connecting the eastern and western parts of the peninsula. Records indicate sea and overland trade in the 18th and 19th centuries with the western coast of India, and Sri Lanka. During the 1840s, cotton production flourished in the region, and was exported to Britain. Other exports included jaggery, chillies, tobacco, palmyra fiber, salt, dried saltwater fish, and cattle.

Agriculture is a major contributor to the economy and the major produces in the region include rice and cotton. Food-processing industries have developed since the late 1990s. Other industries include rice mills, and blue metal manufacturing, located on the outskirts of the city. Beedi production is a major industry, and is a significant contributor to exports from the town. The region has significant limestone deposits, which has resulted in the development of cement industry. Other small scale industries include handloom, mat and basket weaving, palmyrah products, poultry, brick kilns, tiles making, carpentry, metal works, terracotta, and lacquerware. In 1991, the Tirunelveli district ranked second in the state in the number of women workers.

The Tirunelveli Industrial Estate was established in 1959 by the Government of Tamil Nadu. An information technology park is located in Gangaikondan, about 20 km (12 mi) north of the city. An industrial Special Economic Zone, is located 30 km (19 mi) from the city, and houses various textile, calcite production, and bottled oxygen manufacturing units. The region is a major area for wind power generation, with various wind mills located on the outskirts of city.

== Transport ==
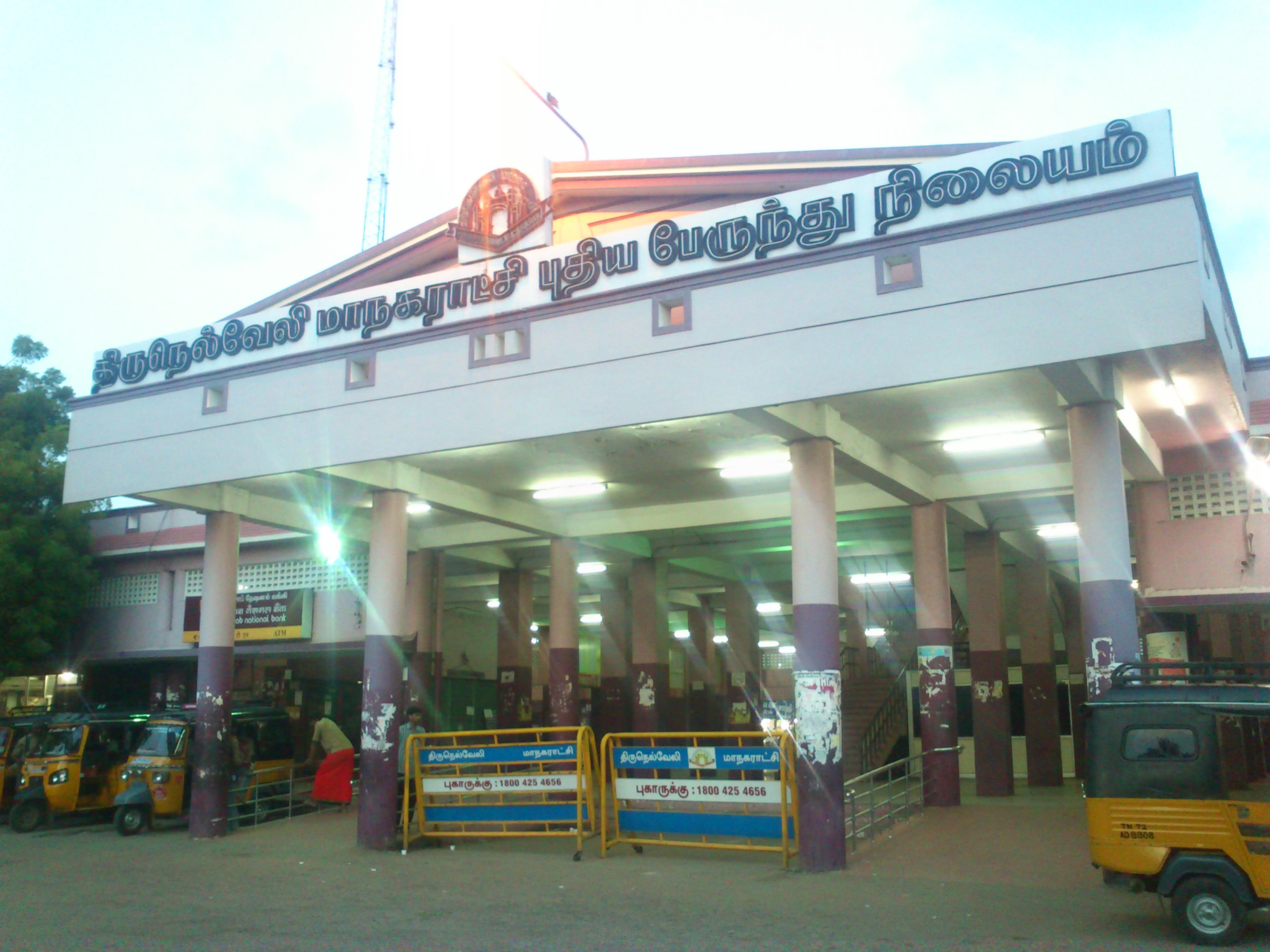
Tirunelveli Bus stand

Tirunelveli has an extensive road network. As of 2025, the corporation maintains about 933.32 km (579.94 mi) of roads including 687.76 km (427.35 mi) of paved roads, and 242.73 km (150.83 mi) of concrete roads. The National Highway 44 (old NH 7) and National Highway 82 pass through the city. Several State Highways connect the city to nearby towns such as Sankarankovil, Thoothukudi, and Tiruchendur. There are two bridges across the Tamirabarani river in the city. The Sulochana Mudaliar bridge was constructed in the 1840s, and connects Tirunelveli wit Palayamkottai. The Thiruvalluvar bridge was opened in 1972, and is situated near the Tirunelveli Junction railway station.

The main bus stand, Dr. MGR Bus Stand, opened in 2003, is located in Veinthaankulam. The bus stand was further renovated and opened in December 2021. Intra city bus stations are located at railway junction and Palay. The Tamil Nadu State Transport Corporation and the State Express Transport Corporation operate intercity bus services.

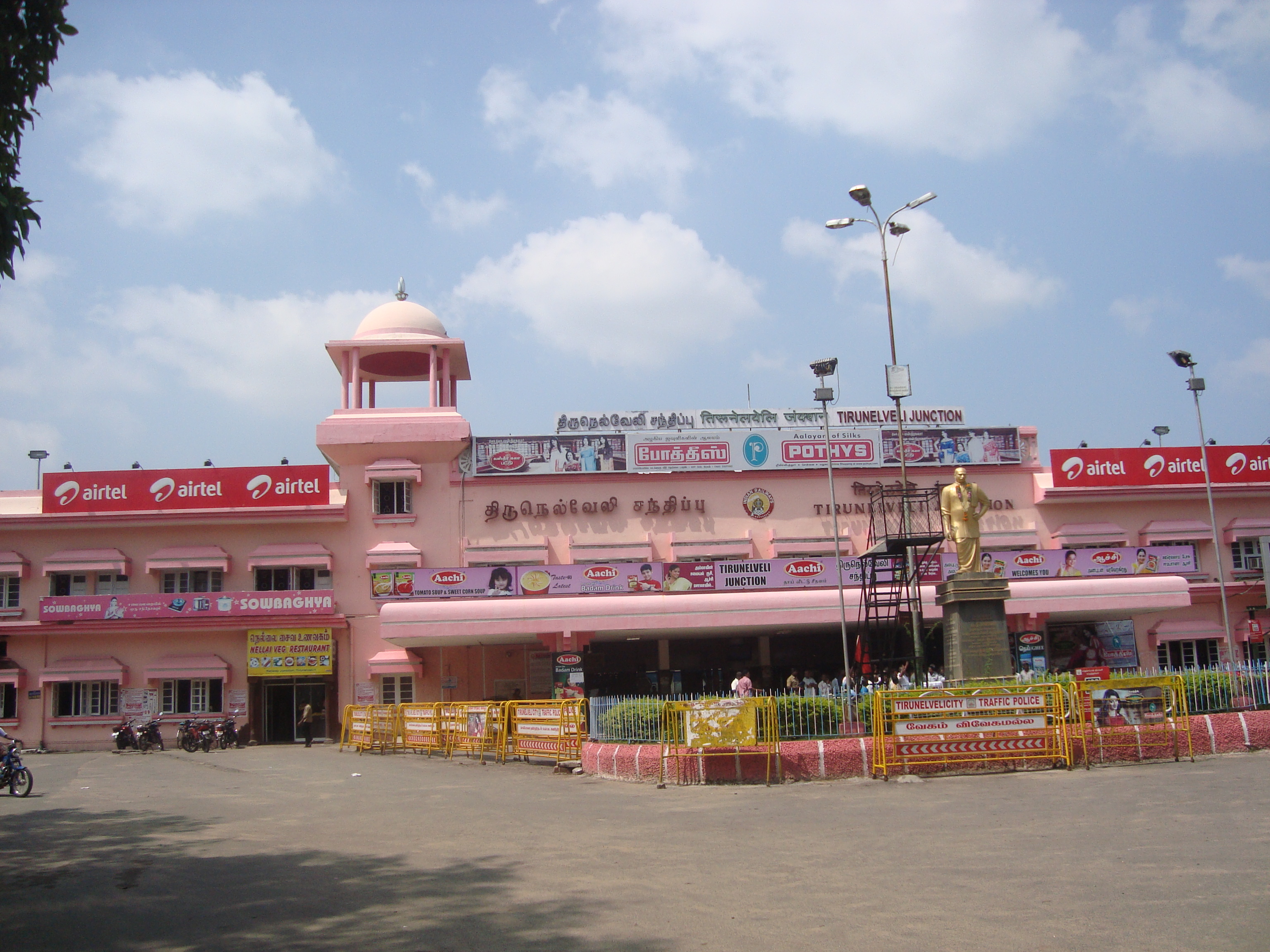
Tirunelveli Junction

Tirunelveli Junction railway station is one of the major railway stations in the Madurai division of the Southern Railway zone. The line from Tirunelveli to Sengottai railway station was opened in 1903, and the connection to Kollam was completed later. The station is connected to Vanchi Maniyachchi Junction to the north, Nagercoil Junction to the south, Tenkasi Junction to the west, and Tiruchendur to the east. There are train services connecting the station to various Indian cities from the station.

The nearest airport is the Tuticorin Airport in Thoothukkudi district, located 22 km (14 mi) east of the city. The nearest international airports are Thiruvananthapuram International Airport, about 130 km (81 mi) away and Madurai Airport, 150 km (93 mi) away from the city.

== Culture and recreation ==
Tirunelveli has several Hindu temples, primary of which is the Nellaiappar Temple, dedicated to Shiva. The temple is mentioned in the verses of Tevaram, a 7th-century work by Sambandar. It is one of the Pancha Sabhai temples, the five royal courts of Nataraja (the dancing form of Shiva), where he performed a cosmic dance. The temple was expanded in the 16th century and has a number of sculptures and carved pillars. During the annual festival, the temple car is brought around the streets near the temple. The city is also home to the Uchchhishta Ganapathy Temple, one of the largest temples dedicated to Ganapathi.

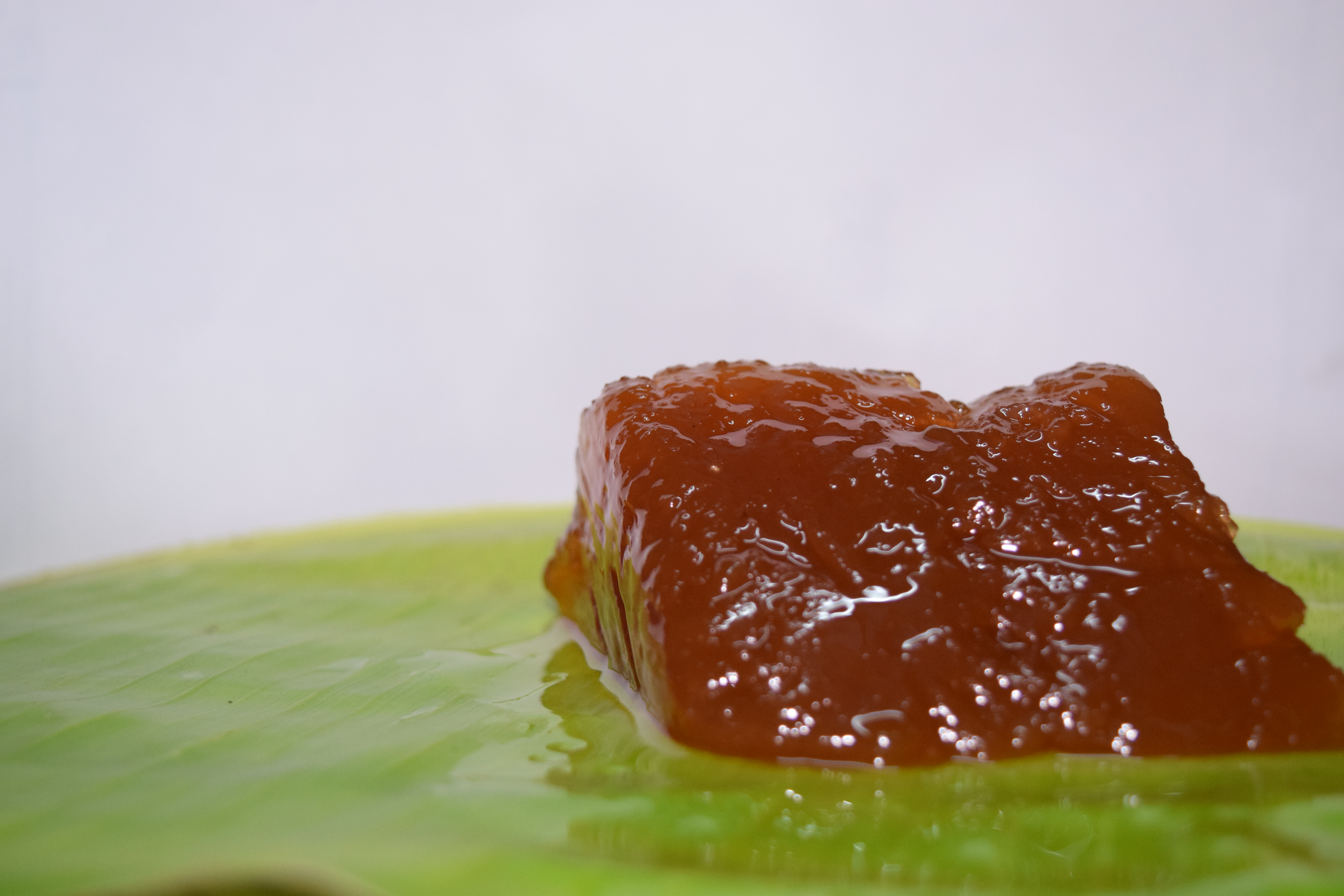
Tirunelveli halwa

Tirunelveli is known for halwa, a sweet made of wheat flour, sugar, and ghee. It originated during the mid-1800s, and later spread to other places in the region. Iruttu Kadai, a shop opened in the early 20th century, is popular and unique.

Tirunelveli has a number of cinemas, with the Central theater, opened in 1962, being the largest. There are few radio stations that operate from the city. The Anna stadium is the popular sports venue in the city. The Sports Development Authority of the Government of Tamil Nadu is runs several sporting facilities in the city. The Government exhibition is an annual event at the exhibition grounds. Other places of interest include the nearby Manimuthar and Papanasam Dams, Ariakulam, Koonthankulam Bird Sanctuary, Manjolai, and Upper Kodaiyar.

== Education ==
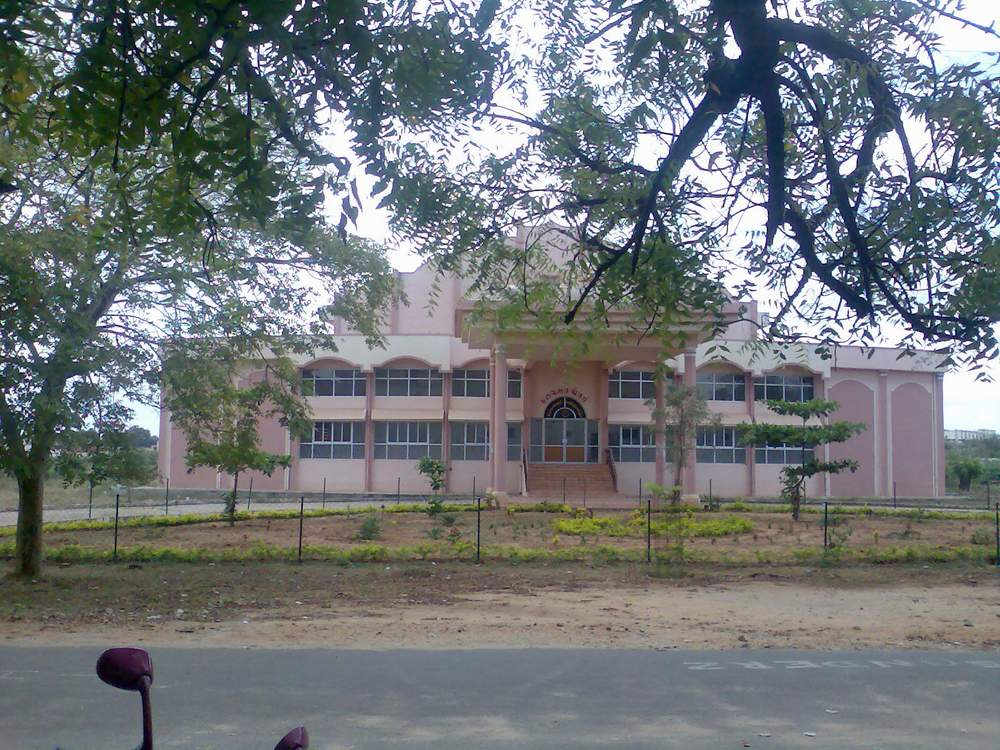
Tirunelveli Medical College

Since ancient times educational centres have been present in the Tirunelveli district instructing on the sciences and Vedas. The first girls school was opened in 1821. Later, a two tier school system was introduced by the British Raj, with the district schools, teaching English and sub-district schools, teaching vernacular languages. There were four sub-district schools: two teaching Tamil and one each for Telugu and Persian. As of 2007, the city had 80 schools including 29 higher secondary schools, 12 high schools, 22 middle schools, and 17 primary schools. The city corporation operates 33 of these schools. As per a report in 2002, the drop in female school attendance between ages 15 and 19 is almost four times greater than that in the rest of Tamil Nadu.

The Manonmaniam Sundaranar University is located in the city. There are eight arts and science colleges and six professional colleges in the city. Other major government institutions include Tirunelveli Medical College, Veterinary College and Research Institution, Government Law College, Tirunelveli, and Government College of Engineering, Tirunelveli. The Sarah Tucker College, established in 1895, was the first women's college in the state. The Indian Institute of Geomagnetism operates the Equatorial Geophysical Research Laboratory in the city. The city has a District Science Center with permanent exhibitions, science shows, interactive tours, a mini-planetarium and sky observation deck.

== Utility services ==
Electricity is regulated and distributed by the Tamil Nadu Electricity Board. The city is headquarters for the Tirunelveli Electricity Distribution Circle. Water supply is provided by the city corporation, and is derived from the Tamirabarani river, throughout the city. As of 2011, about 100 metric tonnes of solid waste were collected from the city in door-to-door collection, after which source segregation and disposal is performed by the sanitary department of the corporation. The underground drainage system was constituted in 1998, and covers part of the city. The remaining system for disposal of sewage is through septic tanks and public conveniences. The corporation maintains about 184.8 km (114.8 mi) of stormwater drains. The government operates hospitals and primary health care centers, and conducts family-welfare and immunisation programs. In addition, there are several private hospitals and clinics providing health care to citizens.

Tirunelveli is part of the Tirunelveli telecom district of Bharat Sanchar Nigam Limited, India's state-owned telecom and internet-services provider, which provides fixed line, and broadband internet services. The city has a Passport Seva Kendra, which accepts passport applications from the Tirunelveli region for processing at the passport office in Madurai.
