= Cianjur =

- District

Regional transcription(s)
  - Sundanese: ᮎᮤᮃᮔ᮪ᮏᮥᮁ
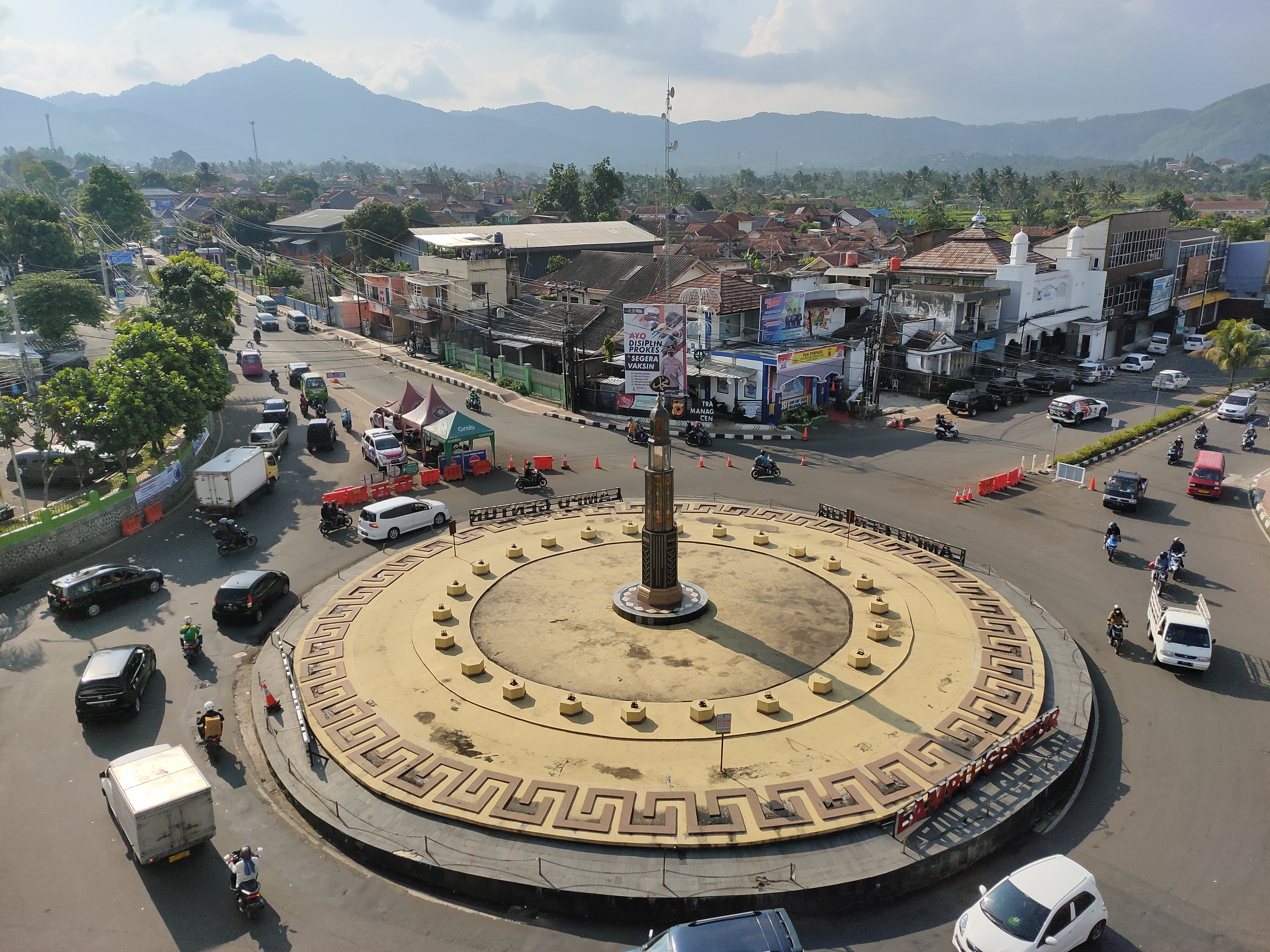
- Gentur Lamp Monument

- Location in Java and Indonesia Cianjur (Indonesia)
- Coordinates: 6°49′12″S 107°8′27″E
- Country: Indonesia
- Province: West Java
- Regency: Cianjur Regency
- Inception: 1677

Government
  - Mayor: Tomtom Dani Gardiat
  - Secretary: Kuntjara Sobandi Sachri

Area
  - Total: 26.24 km^{2} (10.13 sq mi)
- Elevation: 392 m (1,286 ft)

Population (2025 estimate)
  - Total: 178,798
  - Density: 6,814/km^{2} (17,650/sq mi)
- Time zone: UTC+7 (IWT)
- Postal code: 43211
- Area code: (+62) 263
- Villages: 11
- Website: Official website

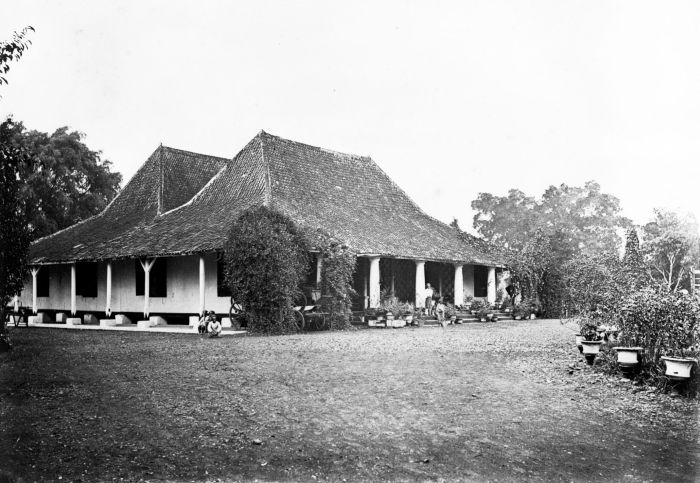
A logement (inn) in Cianjur in the early 1900s

Cianjur (Sundanese: ᮎᮤᮃᮔ᮪ᮏᮥᮁ) is a town and district in the West Java province of Indonesia, and is the seat of Cianjur Regency. The district of Cianjur is located along one of the main roads between Jakarta (120 km to the northwest) and Bandung (60 km to the east). The population was 158,125 at the 2010 Census and 173,265 at the 2020 Census; the official estimate as of 2025 was 178,798. Because of its location, some of Cianjur's residents commute to work in Bandung.

The road on which Cianjur is located used to be the main (extremely busy) road from Jakarta to Bandung but was in effect replaced as the main road link between these two main cities when the Jakarta-Bandung tollroad was fully completed in 2005. However, due to its low traffic, Cianjur returned as one of the alternative routes for travellers from Jakarta and Bandung.

== History ==
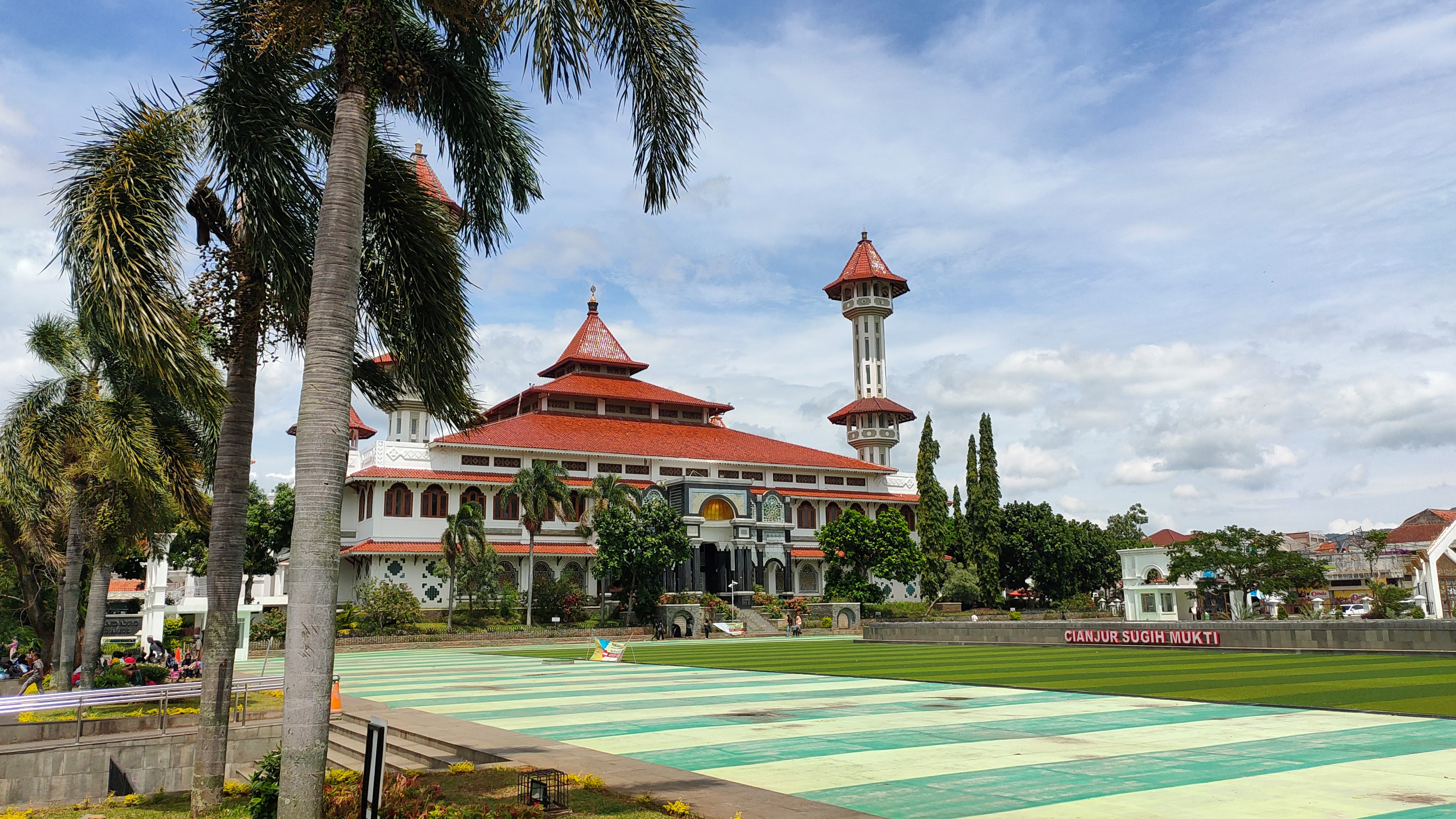
Grand Mosque of Cianjur

Cianjur was founded in 1677, with the first head of the town being R. A. Wiratanudatar I, entitled Dalem Cikundul, as the descendant from the old Sundanese city of Pajajaran.

By 2007 the city government asked female municipal employees to wear jilbab (hijab). It also placed road signs encouraging women to wear jilbab.

A magnitude 7.0 earthquake struck offshore West Java on September 2, 2009, killing 21 people in Cianjur alone.

Another 5.6 magnitude earthquake occurred on November 21, 2022, killing 331 and injuring 7,729 others.

== Administrative divisions ==
Cianjur District is divided into eleven administrative villages which are as follows, with their areas and populations as officially estimated for mid-2024, together with their post codes:

Kode Wilayah	Name of desa	Area in km^{2}	Population mid 2024 estimate	Post code
32.03.01.2001	Babakankaret	5.00	11,580	43211
32.03.01.2002	Nagrak	4.22	17,915	43215
32.03.01.2003	Sukamaju	3.15	10,973	43211
32.03.01.2004	Mekarsari	2.98	13,391	43211
32.03.01.2005	Limbangansari	2.24	12,733	43211
32.03.01.1006	Pamoyanan	0.92	15,296	43211
32.03.01.1007	Sawahgede	1.14	16,820	43212
32.03.01.1008	Bojongherang	1.99	17,015	43216
32.03.01.1009	Sayang	1.82	36,516	43213
32.03.01.1010	Solokpandan	0.66	11,553	43214
32.03.01.1011	Muka	2.12	19,278	43215
32.03.01	Totals	26.24	178,798	

Pamoyanan, Sawahgede, Bojongherang, Sayang, Solokpandan and Muka are formally classed as urban kelurahan, while the other five villages are rated as rural desa.

== Economy ==
The district mainly produces home and micro Industrial products, especially leather, wood, precious metals, woven, pottery, fabrics, and foods.

== Transportation ==
After being dormant for about 2 years, the train called Siliwangi between Sukabumi and Cianjur was reactivated on 8 February 2014. It is faster than the buses which are usually trapped in traffic jams, but the cost of a train ticket is double that of using buses.

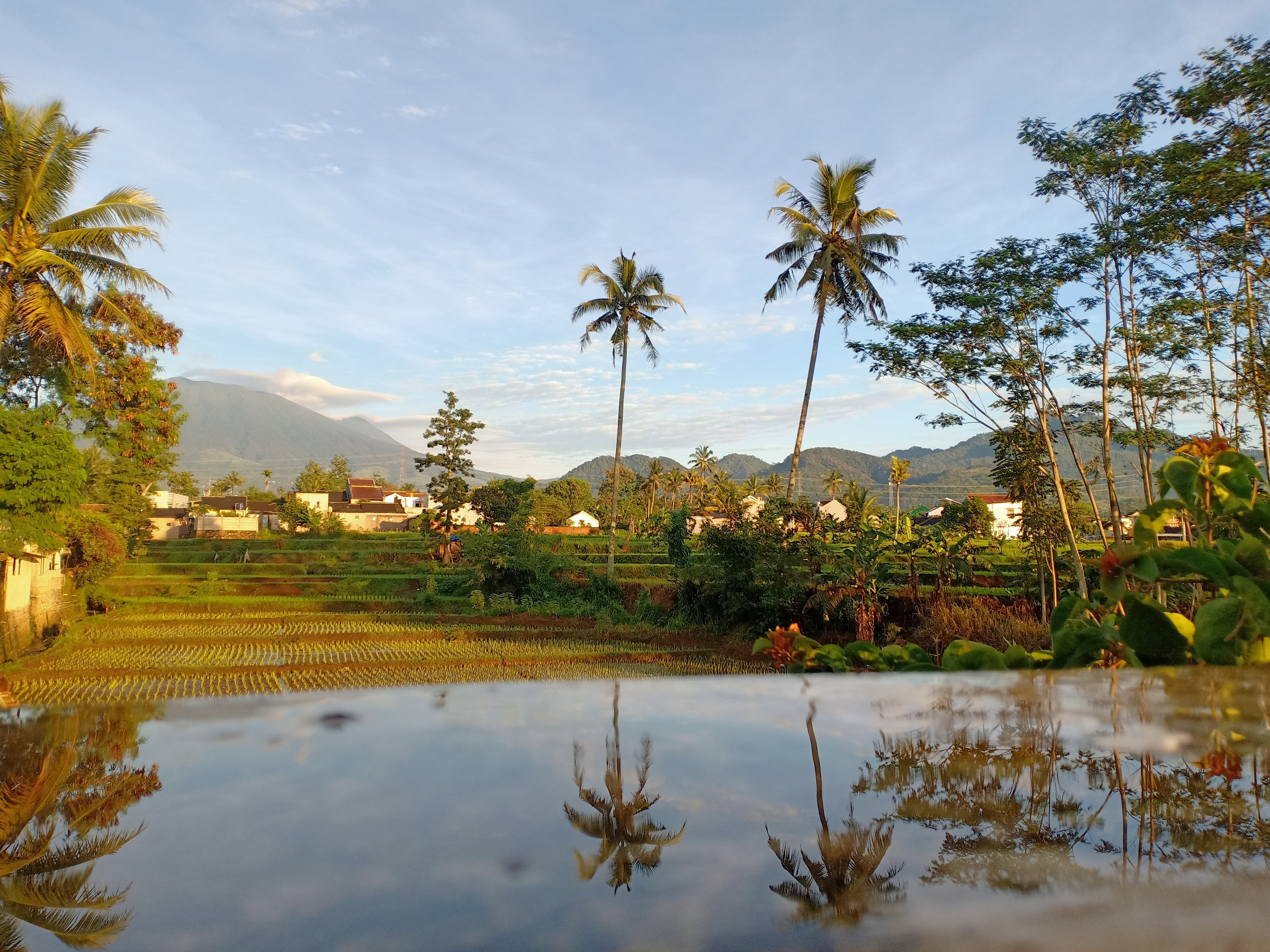
Paddy fields in Mekarsari village

== Climate ==
Cianjur has a tropical rainforest climate (Af) with moderate rainfall from June to September and heavy rainfall from October to May.

Climate data for Cianjur
Month	Jan	Feb	Mar	Apr	May	Jun	Jul	Aug	Sep	Oct	Nov	Dec	Year
Mean daily maximum °C (°F)	28.1 (82.6)	28.3 (82.9)	29.0 (84.2)	29.3 (84.7)	29.5 (85.1)	29.3 (84.7)	29.4 (84.9)	29.9 (85.8)	30.4 (86.7)	30.2 (86.4)	29.5 (85.1)	28.9 (84.0)	29.3 (84.8)
Daily mean °C (°F)	24.0 (75.2)	24.1 (75.4)	24.4 (75.9)	24.7 (76.5)	24.7 (76.5)	24.1 (75.4)	23.9 (75.0)	24.1 (75.4)	24.6 (76.3)	24.7 (76.5)	24.5 (76.1)	24.5 (76.1)	24.4 (75.9)
Mean daily minimum °C (°F)	20.0 (68.0)	19.9 (67.8)	19.9 (67.8)	20.1 (68.2)	19.9 (67.8)	18.9 (66.0)	18.4 (65.1)	18.3 (64.9)	18.8 (65.8)	19.3 (66.7)	19.6 (67.3)	20.1 (68.2)	19.4 (67.0)
Average rainfall mm (inches)	283 (11.1)	245 (9.6)	295 (11.6)	280 (11.0)	204 (8.0)	118 (4.6)	116 (4.6)	111 (4.4)	119 (4.7)	245 (9.6)	299 (11.8)	295 (11.6)	2,610 (102.6)
Source: Climate-Data.org

== Notable residents ==
- Djumhana Wiriaatmadja (1904–1975) politician and diplomat
- Mohammad Enoch (1893–1965) engineer and politician
- Robi Darwis (b. 2003) footballer
- Rd Mochtar (b. 1918) actor
- Nyonya The Tiang Ek, 1920s–30s writer and translator
- Utuy Tatang Sontani (1920–1979) writer and university lecturer
