= Iruttu Kadai =

Sweets store in Tirunelveli, Tamil Nadu, India

Iruttu Kadai Halwa
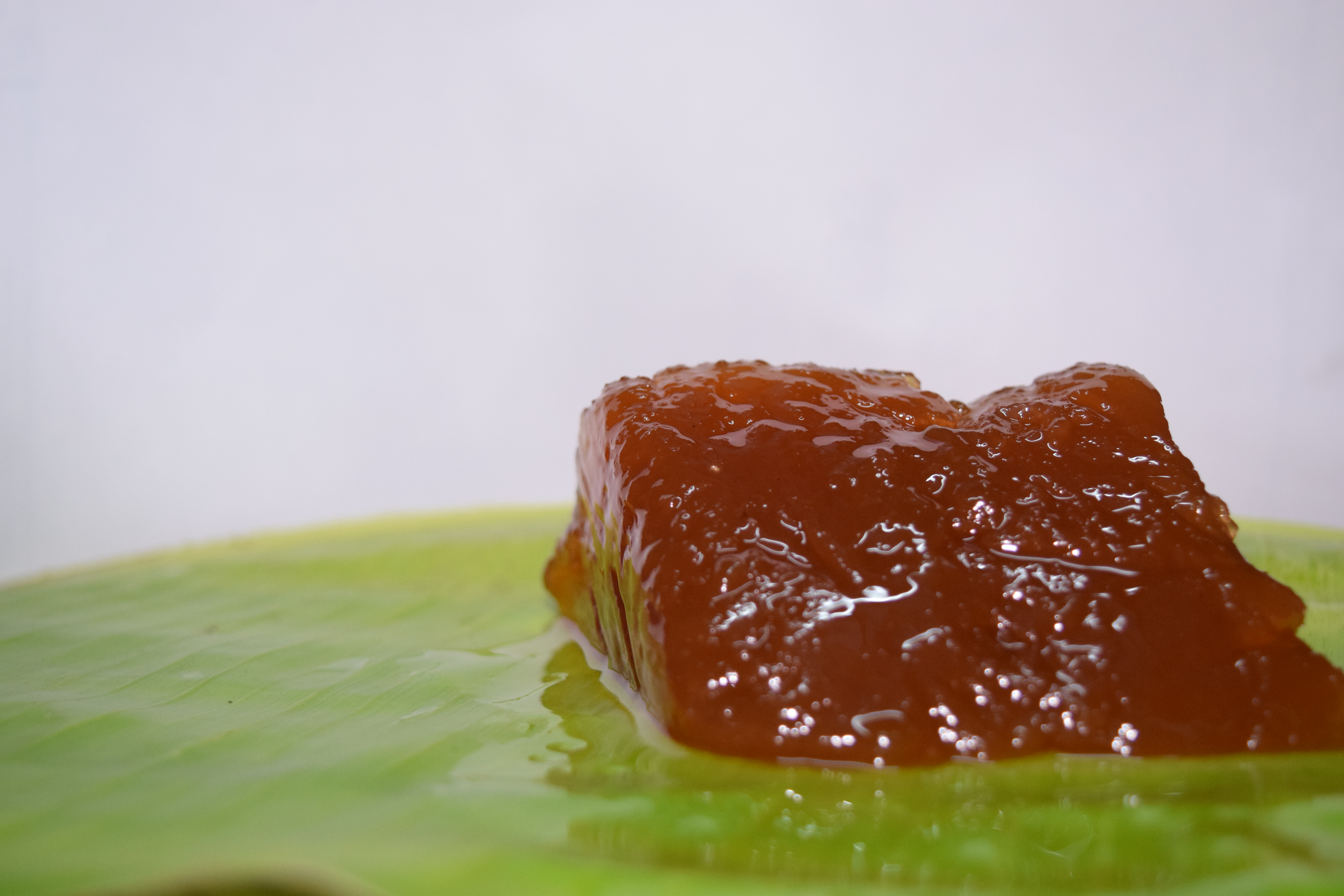
- Tirunelveli Halwa
- Genre: Snacks
- Founded: 1900
- Headquarters: Near Tirunelveli Town, Tirunelveli, Tamil Nadu, India
- Area served: Tirunelveli, Tamil Nadu
- Products: Halva, Snacks

Iruttu Kadai (transl. Dark shop) is an Indian sweets and snacks shop located in Tirunelveli, Tamil Nadu. It is known for "Iruttu Kadai Halwa", a type of Indian sweet halwa made of wheat, sugar and ghee. The store has become a landmark for the city of Tirunelveli over the decades.

== History ==
The halwa shop was established in 1900 and has remained unexpanded ever since. Nevertheless, the store has become a landmark for the city of Tirunelveli.

== Popular media ==
Arvind Swamy in the Tamil movie Singapore Saloon talks about the story of Iruttu Kadai shop to RJ Balaji and its history.
