= Tirunelveli Medical College =

Indian public medical institution

- திருநெல்வேலி மருத்துவக்கல்லூரி
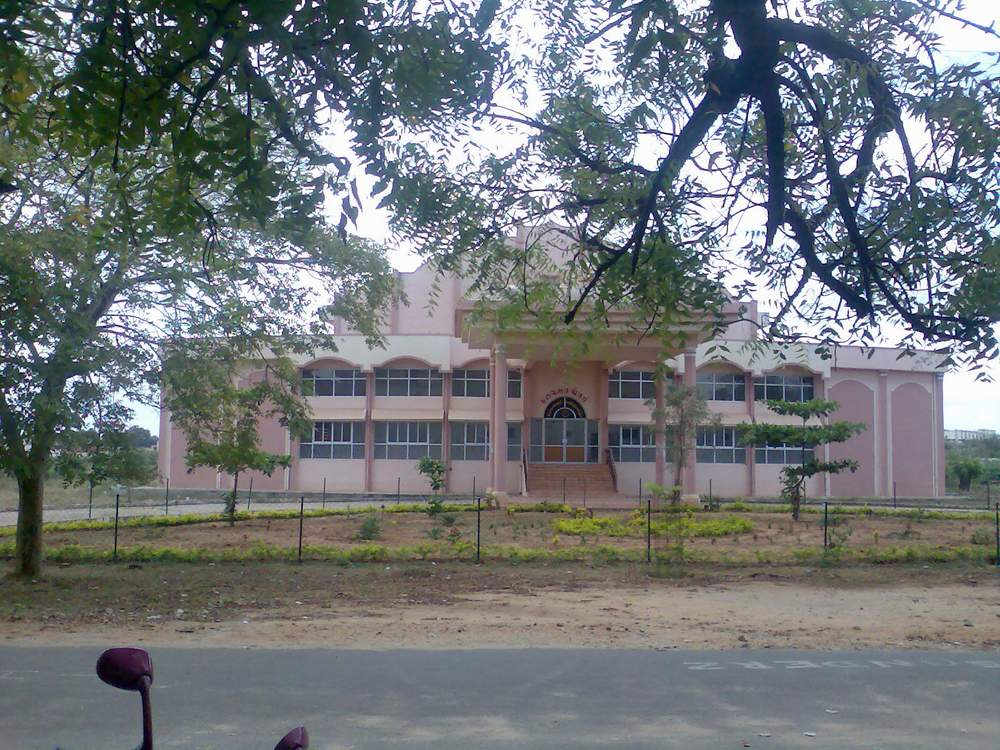
- Motto: Achieving Academic Excellence
- Type: Government Medical College and Hospital
- Established: 1965 (61 years ago)
- Affiliations: Tamil Nadu Dr. M.G.R. Medical University
- Dean: Dr. R. Selvarajan MD(Anaes).,
- Management: Department of Health and Family Welfare, Government of Tamil Nadu
- Faculty: 350 (approx.)
- Administrative staff: 600 (approx.)
- Location: Palayamkottai, Tirunelveli, Tamil Nadu, India; 8.7154°N 77.7555°E
- Campus: Urban, 350 acres (1.4 km^{2})
- Nickname: TVMC
- Website: tvmc.ac.in

Tirunelveli Medical College (Tamil: திருநெல்வேலி மருத்துவக்கல்லூரி), also known as TVMC, is a public medical institution in south India, located in the city of Tirunelveli, Tamil Nadu, India.

The college is affiliated to Tamil Nadu Dr. MGR Medical University and is recognized by the Medical Council of India and World Health Organization.

== History ==
The Government of Tamil Nadu established the Tirunelveli Medical College in 1965, with the agreement of the University of Madras. A total of 75 students were admitted for the MBBS course for the academic year 1965-66 and they had their first year of study at the St Xaviers College for Men and Sarah Tucker College for Women.

College Auditorium

In July 1966, the first batch of second year MBBS students started attending the classes in the then newly constructed Anatomy Block. Other departments like Pharmacology, Pathology, Microbiology and Social & Preventive Medicine started functioning in the subsequent years, and the District Headquarters Hospital was converted to Tirunelveli Medical College Hospital.

The college was affiliated to the Madurai Kamaraj University consequent to its inception in 1967 till the newly formed The Tamil Nadu Dr. MGR Medical University, Guindy, Chennai in 1988.

The college increased the number of admissions to 100 per year during 1973-74 and was subsequently recognised by the Medical Council of India since the year 1977. At present the college gives admission to 250 students each year.

== Emblem ==
The official emblem of the college has the caduceus, paddy (which has been included to denote Tiru'nel'veli ('nel' - நெல் - paddy)) and the words 'Duty, Dignity, Discipline'.

== Medical college ==
The college is present over a sprawling campus of around 286 acres and has lecture halls, libraries, reading rooms, auditoria and 3 separate UG hostels for men (The House of Princes, The House of Lords, Valluvam) and 3 for women (The House of Angels, The Palace of Princess, Junior Angels) with separate hostels for interns (CRMI) and Postgraduates inside the hospital campus. There is a central animal house with a wide range of common laboratory animals, for conduction of research programme. The hospital is 500 meters to the west of the main college campus, and the men's hostel is 500 meters southeast of the campus. The college is among the top 5 in terms of UG course (MBBS) offered across the state Tamil Nadu.

== Location ==
The Tirunelveli Medical College, along with its primary teaching hospital, is located at High Ground in Palayamkottai in the city of Tirunelveli, in the state of Tamil Nadu, India.

The college, the hospital and the hostels are all located within a radius of 1 km. The college is located within about 7 km from the Railway Station and 5 km from the Bus Stand.

== Administration ==
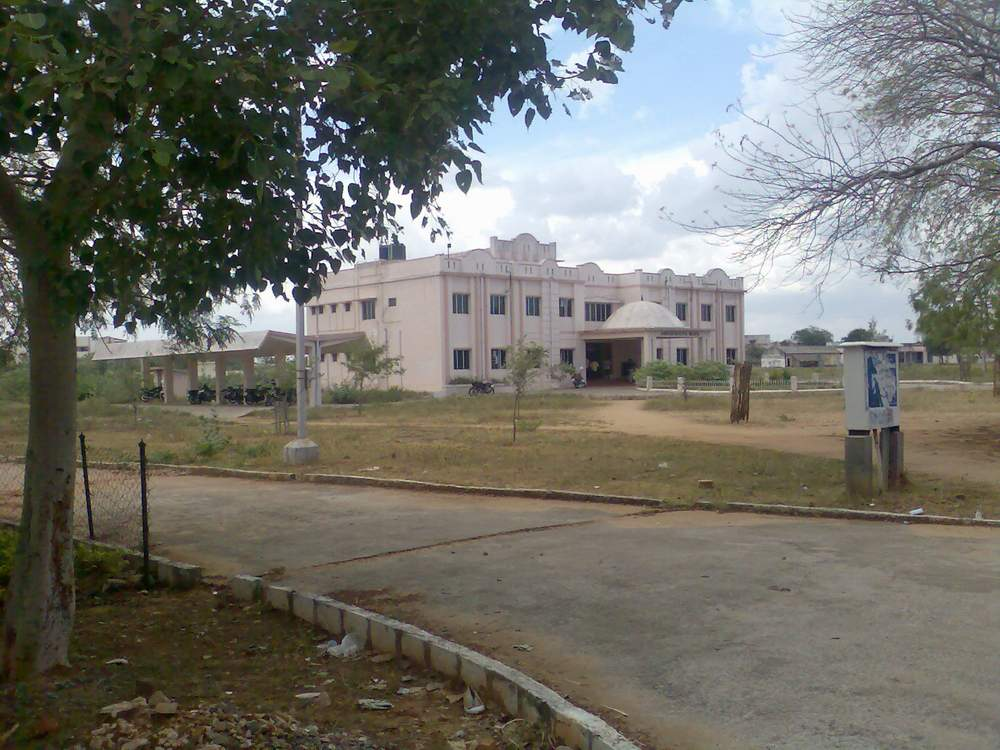
Administrative Block

The college is affiliated to the Tamil Nadu Dr. MGR Medical University. The college and the hospital are funded and managed by the Government of Tamil Nadu. The college has also received PMSSY funding from the Ministry of Health and Family Welfare of the Central Government of India for setting up Super specialty Hospital in the campus. Since 2019, it has a functional 8 floor Superspeciality block located at St Thomas Rd, Athithanar Nagar, Maharaja Nagar, Tirunelveli.

== Courses offered ==
=== Undergraduate Medical Course ===
- MBBS (5 and a half years in duration) with 250 seats per year from 2019

=== Postgraduate Medical Courses ===
- Degree courses (3 years in duration)
1. MD General Medicine (21 seats/year)
2. MD Paediatrics (13 seats/year)
3. MD Anaesthesiology (9 seats/year)
4. MD Psychiatric Medicine (4 seat/year)
5. MD Dermatology, Venereology and Leprosy (6 seat/year)
6. MD Chest Medicine (4 seat/year)
7. MD Pharmacology (2 seats/year)
8. MD Pathology (7 seats/year)
9. MD Microbiology (5 seats/year)
10. MD Forensic Medicine(3 seat/year)
11. MD Physiology (2 seats/year)
12. MS General Surgery (20 seats/year)
13. MS Orthopaedics (12 seats/year)
14. MD Obstetrics and Gynaecology (12 seats/year)
15. MS Otorhinolaryngology (4 seat/year)
16. MS Ophthalmology (4 seat/year)
17. MD Radiotherapy(3 seat/year)
18. MD IHBT (3 seat/year)
19. MD Biochemistry (2 seat/year)

Superspeciality Medical Courses :

- DM Neurology (7 seats/year)
- DM Medical GE (2 seats/ year)
- DM Nephrology (2 seats/year)
- DM Cardiology (2 seats/year)
- DM Medical Oncology (4 seats/year)
- DM Virology (2 seats/year)

SuperSpeciality Surgical courses :

- M.Ch Plastic and Reconstructive Surgery ( 2 seats/year)
- M.Ch Urology (2 seats/year)
- MCh Neuro Surgery (2 seats/year)
- M.Ch Pediatric Surgery (2 seats/year)
- M.Ch Surgical GastroEnterology (2 seats/year)
- M.Ch Surgical Oncology (1 seats/year)

=== Para Medical Courses ===
Diploma Courses in

1. DNMW Diploma in Nursing (100 seats/year)
2. DMLT Diploma in Medical Lab Teachnology (100 seats/year)
3. DRDT Diploma in Radiodiagnosis Technology
4. DMRT Diploma in Radiotherapy Technology
5. DAECT Diploma in Accident and Emergency Care Technology

Certification courses in

1. Acute Care Technology
2. Respiratory Care Technology
3. Operation Theater Technique
4. Anesthesia Technology
5. Plaster Technician
6. Hemodialysis Technology
7. Echo & ECG Technology

Degree Courses in

1. Critical Care Technology
2. Accident & Emergency Care Technology
3. Medical Lab Technology
4. Dialysis Technology
5. Cardiac Technology
6. Respiratory Therapy
7. Cardio-Pulmonary Perfusion Technology
8. Radiology & Imaging Technology
9. Operation Theatre & Anaesthesia Technology
10. Physician Assistant

== Admission ==
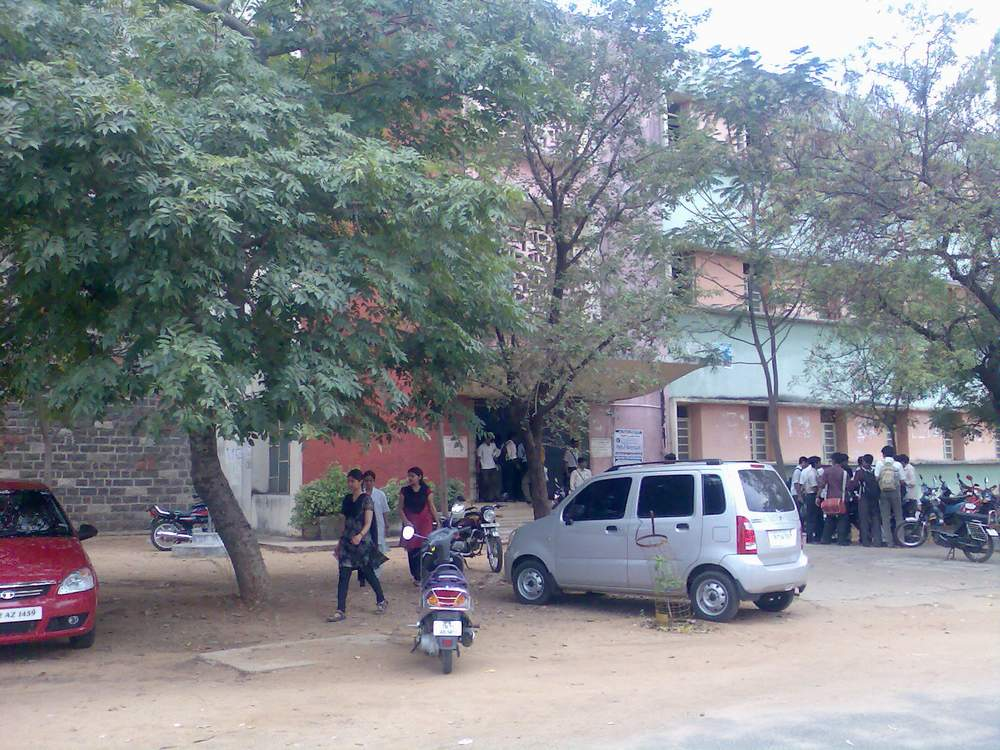
Department of Anatomy

The college admits 250 students to the MBBS course once every year through NEET. Of this 85% is state quota which is allotted by DME of Government of Tamil Nadu and the remaining 15% is All India Quota allotted by MCC of Central Government of Republic of India.

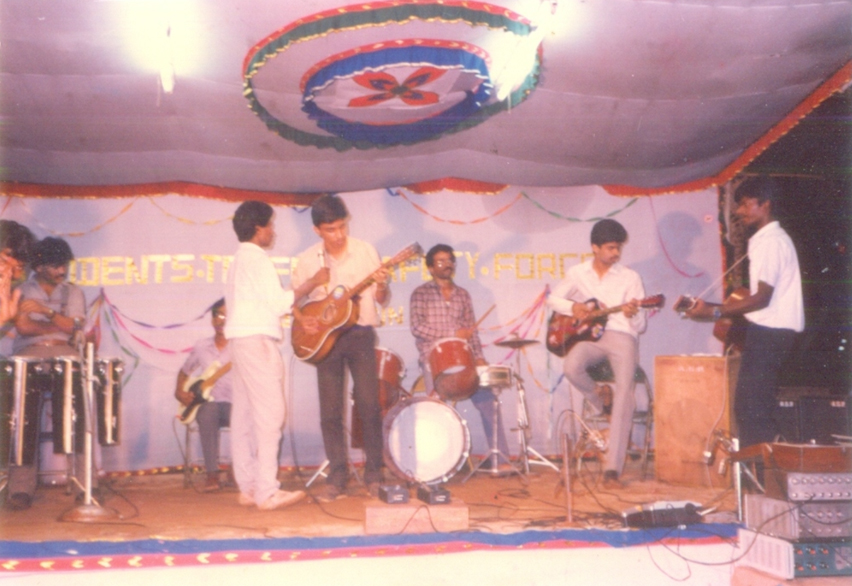

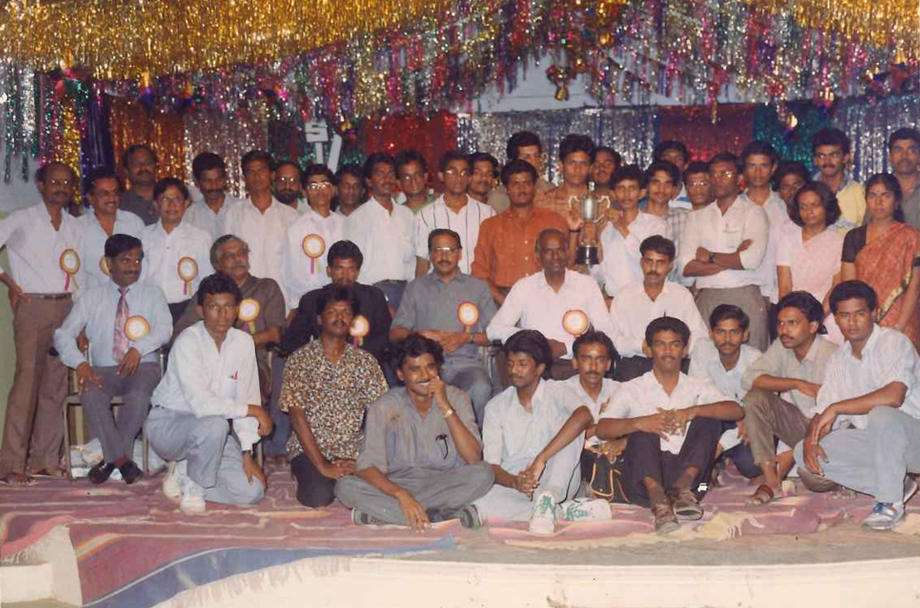

== Gallery ==
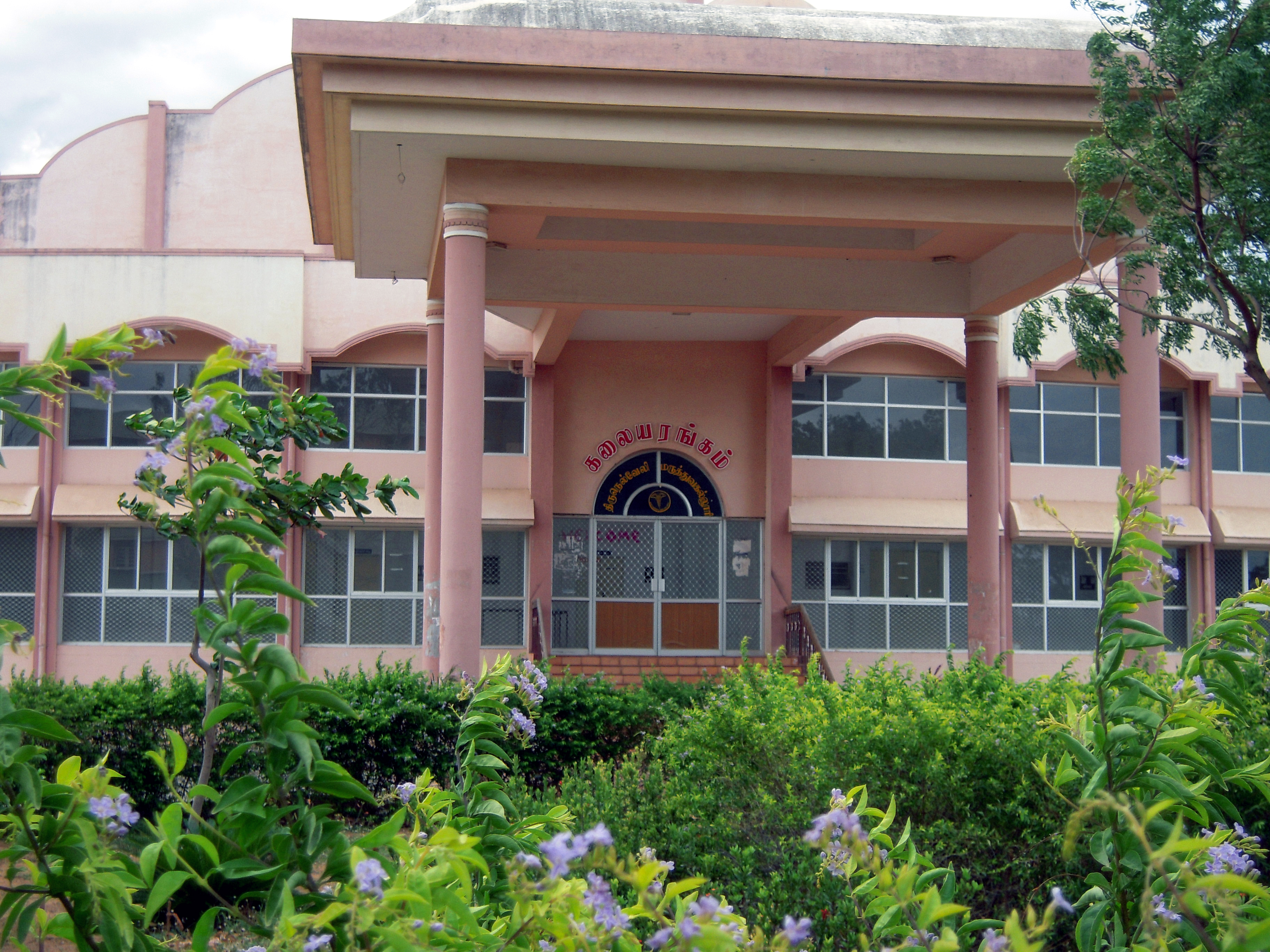
College Auditorium

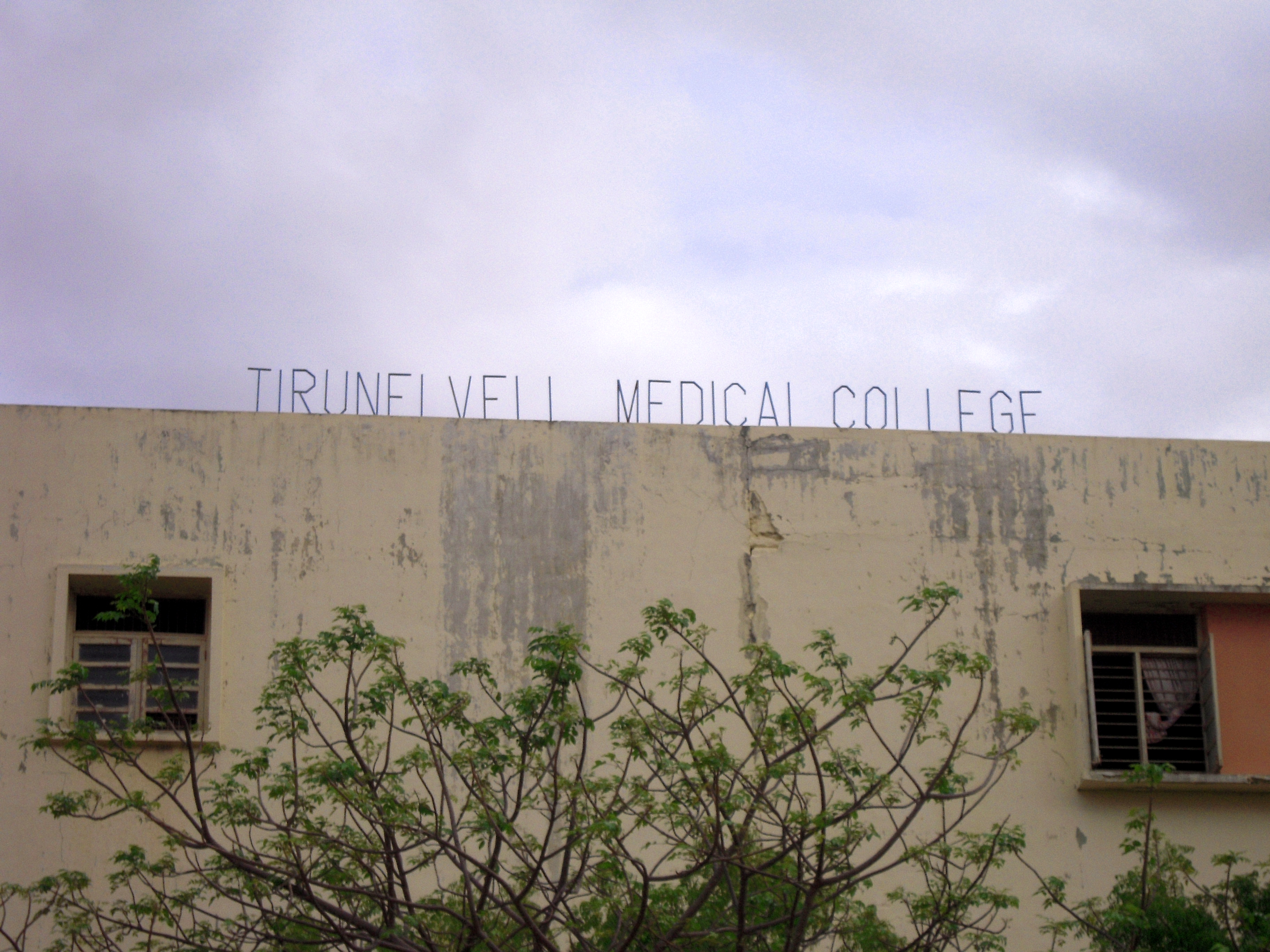
Tirunelveli Medical College

Anatomy and Physiology Departments

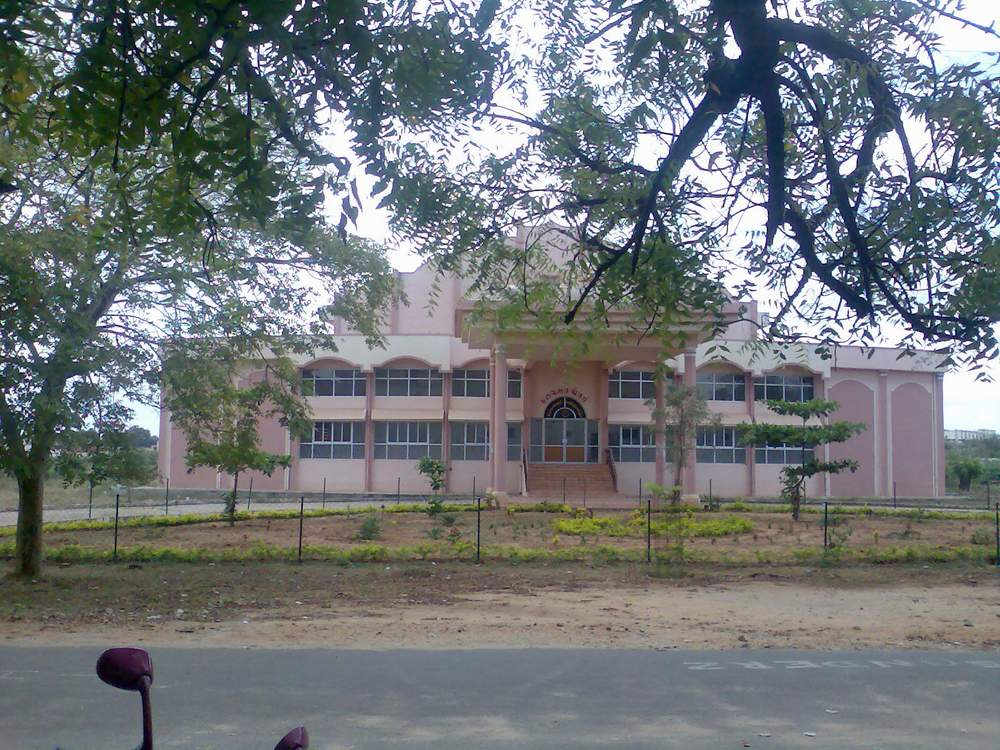
College Auditorium

Lecture Theatre and Examination Halls

Biochemistry and Microbiology Departments

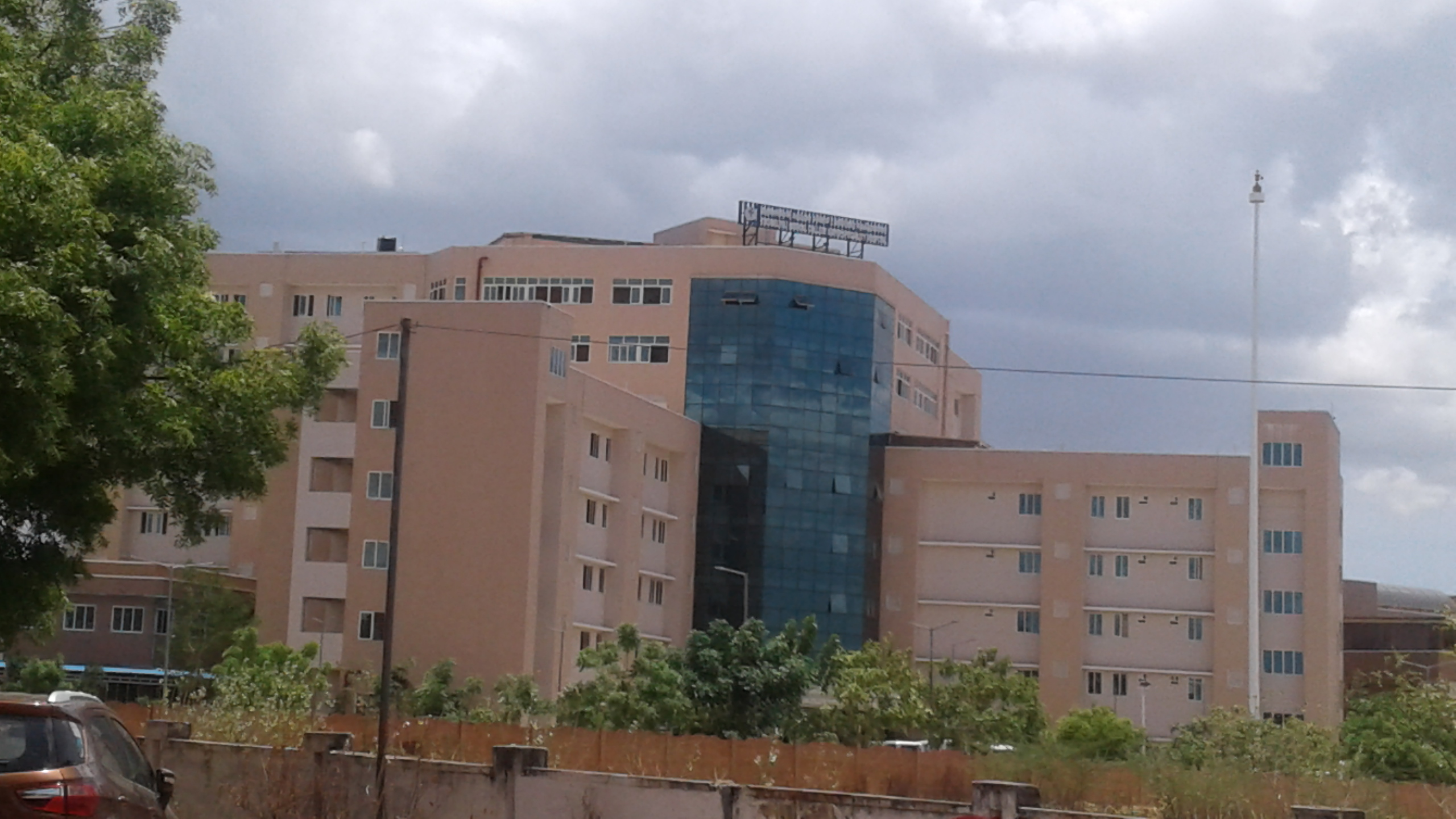
Tirunelveli Medical College Super Speciality hospital
