= Micro Industries =

Computer manufacturer

Micro Industries Corporation
- Type: Private
- Industry: Computer hardware and software; Engineering services; Contract manufacturing
- Founded: 1978; 48 years ago in Ohio, United States
- Founder: Michael A. Curran
- Defunct: 2015; 11 years ago
- Fate: Dissolution

Micro Industries Corporation was a privately held American computer hardware manufacturer and software developer from 1978 to 2015. Based in Ohio and founded by Michael A. Curran, the computer primarily provided engineering services and contract manufacturing services to original equipment manufacturers (OEMs) for most of its existence. In the early 2000s, the company expanded to providing embedded systems for retailers and the healthcare sector in the form of kiosks and other industrial quiet PCs. Curran shuttered the company in 2015, anticipating his retirement.

== History ==
Michael A. Curran founded Micro Industries, a privately held company, in 1978, to provide engineering services to original equipment manufacturers (OEMs). Electronic contract manufacturing services soon followed. In 1982, Micro Industries entered the single-board computer market through a second-source agreement with Intel, followed by similar agreements with National Semiconductor, Motorola, Philips, and Siemens. The following year, the company began a comprehensive engineering and manufacturing automation program to accelerate product development and reduce overall product costs.

Micro Industries was one of the first complete turnkey surface mount technology assembly facilities in the U.S. and one of the founding members of the Surface Mount Technology Association. In 1984 and 1985, Micro was added to the Inc. 500 list.

In November 2015, Curran sought to retire and could not find a suitable replacement, so he closed the company.

== Products ==
The Touch&Go and Touch&Care all-in-one quiet PC computer lines were deployed in 2002 for retail and healthcare markets. By 2004, Micro Industries invented first-of-their kind interactive client systems: a silent, shelf-mountable, 17-inch unit and a 30-inch, portrait-style unit. That same year, Micro Industries founded mCosm, a subsidiary service company. mCosm provided retailers with content development, network infrastructure, remote-system management, and hosted services. Micro Industries built the Center for Interactive Retailing, a unique demonstration environment, in 2004 at the corporate headquarters located in Westerville, Ohio. In 2008, Micro was awarded an Energy Star rating on its Paige17 computer. Micro Industries designed, engineered and manufactured its products in Ohio and partnered with content and software developers to provide premium interactive kiosk and digital signage systems to retailers. Micro Industries was also an affiliate member of the Intel Embedded & Communications Alliance.

=== Hardware ===
- Broad level computers
- PCs (Touch&Go Paige, Paigezilla and Messenger, Touch&Care)
- Self-service hardware and kiosks
- Custom single board computers
- Customer computers

=== Software ===
- Digital signage software
- Kiosk management software

=== Services ===
- Contract manufacturing services
- Hardware design engineering services
- Retail Solutions
- Managed services
- Digital signage solutions
- Self-service kiosk solutions
- Rapid application development
- Interactive content development
- Program management
- Training

=== Touch&Go Series computers ===
Micro Industries Paige 10 computer

Micro Industries introduced the Touch&Go series of unusually styled and retail-hardened computers in 2002. The initial models were Touch&Go Paige and Paigezilla small format fanless computers with configurable ears and peripherals in 10 and 17”, followed by the Touch&Go Messenger large format series in the 32 and 46-inch sizes. In 2009, the Messenger 65-inch landscape and portrait computer was introduced. In 2010, the Multi-touch Messenger 82-inch landscape and portrait computers were launched.

=== Touch&Go software ===
In 2003, mCosm began deploying and monitoring digital signage and kiosk solutions to major retailers using its Touch&Go Enterprise software. In 2005, mCosm developed and launched the mCast digital signage templating system.

== Manufacturing process ==
Micro Industries monitored and controlled its manufacturing process since it began manufacturing in 1978. All of its products were manufactured in the United States. General Motors certified it in 1984 for its SPEAR program, which allowed shipment of products to GM facilities for on-vehicle applications without incoming test and inspection. Micro Industries registered its quality program to the International Organization for Standardization's ISO 9000 standards in 1993, and registered in each subsequent year to meet the diverse elements of the ISO 9001 Quality Management Standard. In 1989, Micro Industries developed a unique process to comply with U.S. Environmental Protection Agency (EPA) requirements for a zero-discharge manufacturing facility, which became operational in 1991. These processes were later registered to ISO 14001 Environmental Management standards.
