= List of villages in Perambalur district =

This is a list of villages in Perambalur district, in the state of Tamil Nadu, India. Its headquarters is the town of Perambalur. Perambalur District comprises Perambalur proper and a number of neighbouring towns and villages with gram panchayats, some encompassing smaller settlements known as hamlets.

A

- Adhanur
- Aduthurai
- Agaram
- Agaram Segur
- Aiyinapuram
- Alambadi
- Allinagaram
- Ammapalayam
- Andhur
- Andikurumbalur
- Annamangalam
- Anukkur
- Appapalayam
- Aranarai
- Arumbavur
- Arunagirimangalam
- Asur
- Athiyur
- Ayyalur
- Ayyikudi

B

- Bommanapadi
- Brahmadesam
- Bujangarayanallur

C

- Chathiramanai
- Chatramanai
- Chettikulam
- Chinna Venmani

D

- Devaiyur

E

- Elambalur
- Elanthalapatty
- Elanthankuzhi
- Elumur
- Eraiyur
- Esanai
- Eachampatti
- Eraiyasamuthiram

G

- Gudalur

I

- Irur

K

- kaarukudi
- K.Pudur
- Kadur
- KAIKALATHUR
- Kaiperambalur
- Kalanivasal
- Koneripalayam
- Kalarampatti
- Kalarampatti
- Kallai
- Kalpadi
- Kannapadi
- Karai
- Kariyanur
- Kavulpalayam
- Keelakanavai
- Keelakarai
- Keelamathur
- Keelaperambalur
- Keelapuliyur
- Kilumathur
- Kolakkanatham
- Kolappadi
- Kolathur
- Koneripalayam
- Koothur
- Kottarai
- Kovilpalayam
- Kunnam
- Kurumbalur
- Kumarabalayam Kudikkadu
- Kurumbapalayam
- Kurur

L

- Ladapuram
- Labbaikudikadu

M

- Malavarayanallur
- Malayaloapatti
- Mettu kalinga raya nallur / M.K.City / Ashok Samydurai
- Mavilangai
- Melamathur
- Melapuliyur
- Mettupalayam
- Mettur
- Moolakadu
- Moongilpady

N

- Nakkasalem
- Namaiyur
- Nannai
- Naranamangalam
- Nathakkadu
- Nattarmangalam
- Navalur
- Neikuppai (Vepanthatai)
- Neikuppai
- Nochiam
- Nochikulam
- Nothapur

O

- Ogalur
- Olaippadi
- Othiyam

P

- Padalur
- Palaiyur
- Palayam
- Palaya virali patty
- Pandagapady
- Palla kalinga Raya Nallur / Ashok Samydurai
- Paravai
- Pasumbalur
- Pennakonam
- Peraiyur
- Perali
- Periyavadakkari
- Periyavenmani
- Perumathur
- Peryaammapalayam
- Pilimisai
- Pillangulam
- Pimbalur
- Ponnagram
- Poolambadi
- Pudunaduvalur
- Pudunaduvalur
- Puduvettakudi
- Pudukurrichi

R

- Ramalingapuram
- Renganathapuram

S

- Sathanur
- Sengunam
- Sillakudi
- Siruganpur
- Sirugudal
- Sirumathur
- Sirumathur Kudikadu
- Siruvachur
- Siruvayalur
- Sithali
- Sokkanatha Puram
- senjeri

T

- T.Kalathur
- Thaluthalai
- Thambiranpatty
- Thenur
- Therani
- Thevaiyur
- Thimmur
- Thirumandurai
- Thiruvalandurai
- Thondamandurai
- Thondapady
- Thungapuram
- Thuraimangalam

U

- Udumbiam

V

- V.Kalathur
- Vadakkalur
- Vadakkumadevi
- Vaithiyanathapuram
- Valikandapuram
- Varagupadi
- Varagur
- Vashistapuram
- Vayalapady
- Velur, Perambalur
- Venbavur
- Vengalam
- Veppanthattai
- Venganur

Z

- Z.Athur
- Zamin peraiyur
