= Perambalur taluk =

Taluk of Perambalur district of the Indian state of Tamil Nadu

Coordinates: 11.23°N 78.88°E

Perambalur taluk is a taluk of Perambalur district in Tamil Nadu, India. Its headquarters is the town of Perambalur.

== Geography ==
Perambalur taluk comprises the town of Perambalur proper and a number of neighbouring towns and villages with gram panchayats, some encompassing smaller settlements known as hamlets:

- Aranarai
- Alambadi
- Appapalayam
- Arumbavur
- Chathiramanai
- Chinna Venmani
- Elambalur
  - Indira Nagar
  - Mahathmaganthi Nagar
  - MGR Nagar
  - Nethaji Nagar
  - Samathuvapuram Nagar
- Eraiyur
- Esanai
- ladapuram
- K.Pudur Village
- Kadur
- Kalanivasal (Kalazhivasal)
- Kalarampatti
- Kallai
- Kalpadi
- Kavulapalayam
- Keelakkarai
- Keelapuliyur
- Ķilumathur
- Keezhakkanavai
- Koneripalayam
- Kunnam
- Kurumbalur
- Senjeri
- Labbaikudikadu
- Malayalapatty
- Melapuliyur
- Mettankadu
- Mettupalayam
- Mettur
- Moolakadu
- Nakkasalem
- pudhu ammapalayam
- Namaiyur
- Nathakkadu
- Navalur
- Nochiyam
- Padalur
- Palaya Sathanur
- Palayam
- Paravai
- Periya Venmani
- Ponnagram
- Poolambadi
- Pudu vettaikudi
- Pudunaduvalur
- Renganathapuram
- Selliyam Palayam
- Sengunam
- Sirugudal
- Sirumathur Kudikadu
- Siruvachur
- Sokkanatha Puram
- Thambiranpatty
- Thirupeyar
- Thungapuram
- Thuraimangalam
- V. Kalathur
- Valikandapuram
- Varagupadi
- Vadakkalur
- Vadakumathavi
- Velur
- Vellanru
- veppanthattai
- vengalam
- Veppur
- Vilamuthur
- Vaithiyanathapuram
  - Eachampatti
  - Pudhu Ammapalayam

== Demographics ==
According to the 2011 census, the taluk of Perambalur had a population of 161,993 with 81,313 males and 80,680 females. There were 992 women for every 1,000 men. The taluk had a literacy rate of 73.87%. Child population in the age group below 6 years were 7,704 Males and 7,054 Females.
