= Perambalur (disambiguation) =

Perambalur (Tamil: பெரம்பலூர்), is a city in Tamil Nadu, India.

Perambalur may also refer to:

- Perambalur district
- Perambalur division, is a revenue division.
- Perambalur taluk
- Perambalur block, is a revenue block.
- Perambalur (state assembly constituency)
- Perambalur (Lok Sabha constituency)
- Perambalur Buddhas, Buddhist images found in Thiyaganur.
