= Brahmadesam =

Brahmadesam may refer to several places in Tamil Nadu, India:

- Brahmadesam (Viluppuram), a village panchayat in Viluppuram taluk, Villupuram District
- Brahmadesam (Tindivanam), a village panchayat in Tindivanam Taluk, Villupuram District
- Brahmadesam (Ambasamudram), a village in Ambasamudram Taluk, Thirunelveli District
- Brahmadesam (Cheyyar), a village in Cheyyar Taluk, Tiruvannamalai district
- Brahmadesam (Bhavani), a village in Bhavani taluk, Erode district
- Brahmadesam (Veppanthai), a village in Veppanthai taluk, Perambalur district

== See also ==
- Brahmadesh, an alternative name of Myanmar in India
- Brahma (disambiguation)
- Desa (disambiguation)
