= State Highway 142 (Tamil Nadu) =

Road in Tamil Nadu, India

State Highway 142

Route information
- Maintained by Highways and Minor Ports Department
- Length: 39.4 km (24.5 mi)

Major junctions
- From: Thuraiyur, Tiruchirappalli district, Tamil Nadu
- To: Perambalur road, Ariyalur district, Tamil Nadu

Location
- Country: India
- State: Tamil Nadu
- Districts: Trichy and Ariyalur

Highway system
- Roads in India; Expressways; National; State; Asian; State Highways in Tamil Nadu

Tamil Nadu State Highway 142 (SH-142) is a State Highway maintained by the Highways Department of Government of Tamil Nadu. It connects Thuraiyur with Perambalur road in Tamil Nadu.

== Route ==
The total length of the SH-142 is 39.4 kilometres (24.5 mi). The route is from Thuraiyur – Perambalur road, via Kurumbalur.

== See also ==
- Highways of Tamil Nadu
