= Kaiperambalur =

Kaiperambalur Kulothunga Chozhapuram
- Panchayat village
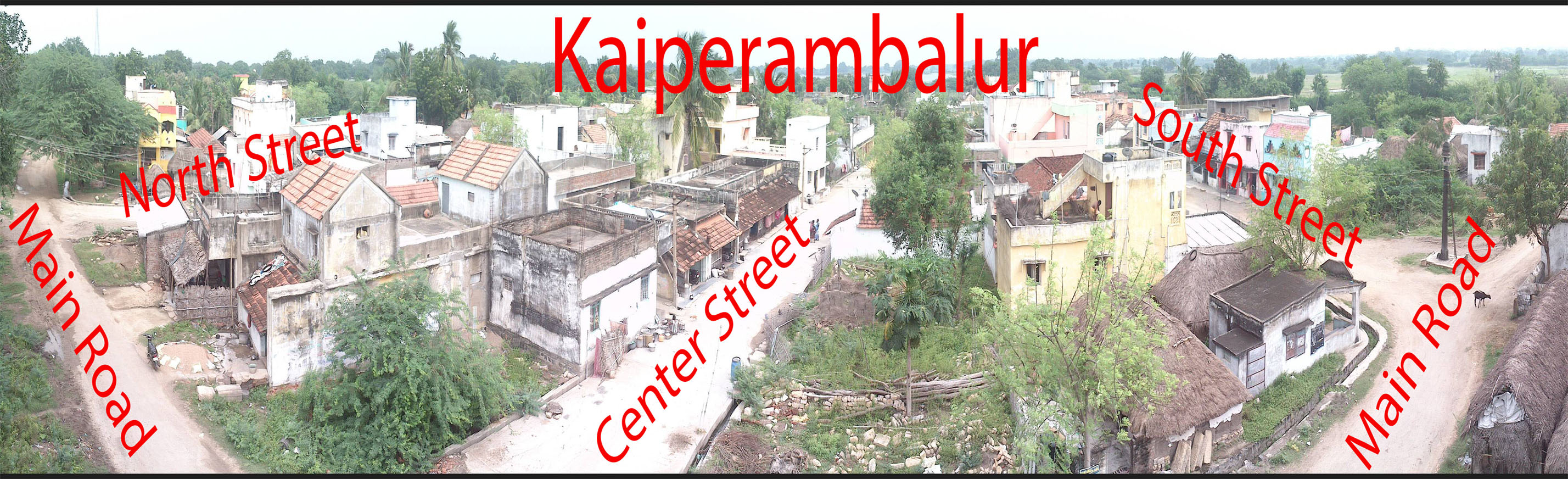
- Kaiperambalur Aerial view

- Location in Tamil Nadu, India Kaiperambalur (India)
- Coordinates: 11.360°N 79.098°E
- Country: India
- State: Tamil Nadu
- District: Perambalur

Government
  - Type: Public
  - Body: Tamil Nadu
  - Rank: No 1

Population
  - Total: 10,024
  - Rank: 1024

Languages
  - Official: Tamil
- Time zone: UTC+5:30 (IST)
- PIN: 621716.
- Telephone code: 04328
- Vehicle registration: TN46, TN45
- Nearest city: Perambalur, Ariyalur, Thittakudi, Trichy.
- Literacy: 72%
- Climate: cool- hat-cool (Köppen)

Kaiperambalur is a panchayat village of the Kizhamathdur district in Perambalur, Tamil Nadu, India. It was formally part of the Tiruchirappalli district.

== History ==
The historical name of Kaiperambalur is கைப்பெரம்பலூர் (Kaippěrampalūr) or Kapparampoor. During the Kulothunga Cholas (c. 1070–1218 CE), this village was noted for its monthly festivals. Two important temples were built: "Siva Temple" and "Lord Perumal Temple". Today, these temples are two of the oldest and most affluent temples in India.

Centuries later, the postal department of India renamed the village to "Kaiperambalur."

Due to the large limestone deposits in the region, many companies within the cement industry have sites in the vicinity of this village. In particular, the factories for the cement companies, Arasu, Birla, Sakthi, Dalmia, and Tamil Nadu, are situated near Ariyalur.

Kaiperambalur is also notable for the Iyyanar Temple situated 25 km from Kaiperambalur. Gangaikonda Cholapuram is also nearby. Gangaikonda Cholapuram is famous for its temple built by King Rajendra Cholan of Chola Empire. King Rajendra Cholan was the son of Rajaraja Cholan who built Tanjore Temple.

== Geography ==
The village is bordered by fertile lands due to the many streams around it, including

- Vattra Kulam in North
- Thirtha Kulam in East
- Periya Aary is West
- Sinna Aaru in South

	Summer	Winter
Max.	40 °C (104 °F)	30 °C (86 °F)
Min.	22 °C (72 °F)	18 °C (64 °F)

== More detail about Kaiperambalur ==
Kaiperambalur is a small village in Veppur Taluk in Perambalur District of Tamil Nadu State, India. It comes under Kilumathur North Panchayath.

It is located 34 km to the east of district headquarters Perambalur, 9 km from Veppur, 265 km from state capital Chennai Kaiperambalur. Pin code is 621716 and postal head office is Tungapuram. Athiyur (4 km), Vadakkalur (5 km).

Ogalur (6 km), Veppur (6 km), Nannai (7 km) are the nearby villages to Kaiperambalur. Kaiperambalur is surrounded by Mangalur Taluk to the north, Sendurai Taluk to the east, Nallur Taluk to the east, Ariyalur Taluk to the south.

Tittakudi, Perambalur, Virudhachalam, Neyveli are the nearby cities to Kaiperambalur.

This place is in the border of the Perambalur District and Ariyalur District. Ariyalur District Ariyalur is south of this place. Also it is in the border of other district Cuddalore.

== Politics ==
Before 1995, Kaiperambalur was under Perambalur Taluk and the Tiruchirappalli district. The composite Perambalur District came into existence after the trifurcation of Tiruchirappalli district on 30 September 1995 as per G.O MS.No 913 Revenue / Y3 dated 30 September 1995. It is now subject to "Kunnam Taluk" in Perambalur district.

The constituency of the Kaiperambalur assembly is part of the Chidambaram (Lok Sabha constituency).

Kizhumathur panchayat was created from the Kaiperamablur North East and Kudikadu North regions; The villages of Kaiperamablur and Kudikadu belong to the Kizhumathur North region. The villages of Kaiperambalur, G.R. Pattanam, and Poonganagarm belong to the Kizhumathur East region.
