= Nakkasalem =

Village in Tamil Nadu, India

Nakkasalem is a village in the Perambalur district in the state of Tamil Nadu, India.

== Location ==
Nakkasalem is a medium-sized village with a population of 3521 in 2009, almost at the geographical centre of Tamil Nadu state. The village is situated on a plain at the foothills of the Pachamalai range of hills. Nakkasalem is well connected to the nearby towns of Thuraiyur (12 km) and Perambalur (21 km) by Tamil Nadu State Highway 142. The nearest major city is Trichy (Tiruchirapalli, 45 km), which also has the nearest train station and airport. The village is about 290 km southwest of Chennai (previously known as Madras). Frequent buses connect Nakkasalem with Thuraiyur, Perambalur, Trichy and beyond.

== Occupation ==
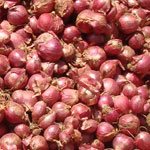
Small onion, produce of Nakkasalem

Farming is the predominant occupation of most people in the village. Annual rainfall is about 800mm, mostly from the northeast monsoon between October and December. Seasonal dryland farming dominates the agricultural activity, although irrigated farming using water drawn from wells by energised pumps is also pursued to some extent. Small onions (Allium cepa var. aggregatum) are the village's most important cash crop. Rice, sorghum, millet, groundnut, sesame, chilli and various legumes are also cultivated and either rain-fed or irrigated.

There is an anecdote that Periyar E. V. Ramasamy visited Nakkasalem on a political campaign in the 1950s, and the villagers gave him his own weight in small onions. It is said that Periyar was so happy with the villagers' gesture that from then on he added vengayam (onion) as his trademark word in speeches, mostly in a humorous way.

During the harvest season, the village transforms into a hive of activity. Scores of buyers, sellers, traders and brokers swarming around the village and the farmers' fields. Lorries constantly ferry thousands of sacks of the red onions to wholesale markets in Trichy.

== Village life ==
Nakkasalem is not a major commercial centre or tourist spot. A high school, two primary schools, a post office, a bank branch, a cooperative society, a rice mill, a veterinary clinic, a couple of petrol stations, and a few brick kilns are the most notable government and private business establishments there. Two private residential schools and an industrial training institute have recently been established near the village. The Thuraiyur–Perambalur highway that passes through the village is dotted with a few shops that also serve as recreational spots and hangouts for the villagers, who engage in lively conversations on politics, cinema and other hot topics of the day. The village is also the transport and educational hub for the nearby smaller villages of Pudu Ammapalayam, Eachampatti and Siruvayalur.

== Temples ==
Like other villages in Tamil Nadu, Nakkasalem has its share of temples. The village has small and medium-size temples to Shiva, Vishnu, Vinayagar, Mariamman, Chelliamman and Ellaiamman, Karuppu the village's guardian deity at the eastern entrance of the village. The Ellaiamman temple houses a unique, imposing statue of the war god Virabhadra, with a large curved moustache, a sharp sword in one hand and burning embers in the other. According to village folklore, Virabhadra was not to be taken out on festive processions, but the villagers once ignored this tradition, incurring the wrath of the deity and causing large fires. Virabhadra was never again taken out of the temple. The village also has a small temple to Hanuman at the foot of the hills. Chettikulam, 5 km away, is a famous local pilgrim centre with a large temple to Shiva in the town centre and a large hilltop temple to Murugan, which draws a huge number of devotees during the festivals of Thai Pusam and Panguni Uthiram. Another nearby village, T Kalathur, 4 km away, has a large dargah, a place of worship popular with local Muslims and people of other faiths.

== Festivals ==
Manju virattu is celebrated during Thai Pongal in the village. Chithirai Thiruvla "Rabbit Hunting" is a festival on the first Sunday of the Tamil month of Chithirai (mid-April to mid-May) every year throughout the Perambalur district. The "kammandi" alias "Kaman Pandikai" is also the famous festival on Tamil 'masi' month on every year.

== Notes ==
11.23°N 78.88°E
