= Mavilangai =

Village

Mavilangai/Mavalingai is a small village in Alathur Taluk (old Kunnam), Perambalur District, Tamil Nadu state. It is located 23 km distance from its District main city Perambalur, and 256 km distance from its State Main City Chennai.

Other villages near Mavilangai are Peragambi (4 km), Kannapadi (3 km), Chettikulam (3.5 km), Kurur (3.5 km), Bomanappadi (6 km), Alatur (Taluk-10 km).

== Colleges near Mavilangai ==
- Thirumathi Elizabeth Polytechnic College
- Roever Engineering College
- Christian Teacher Training Institute
- Dhanalaxmi, Dhanalaxmi srinivasan (Engineering/Diploma/Arts& Science)
- Ramakrishna Plytechnic college
- Nehru Memorial College Puthanampatti (Arts & Science) (22 km)
- Govt Polytechnic College Perambalur (Veloor)

== Schools in Mavilangai ==
- Hindu aided Elementary school
- Aathi thiravidar thuvakkapalli

== Industries near Mavilangai ==
- MRF tyres company
- Chakra Milk Dairy Naranamangalam
- Vijay Milk Dairy Peramangalam

== Banks nearby Mavilangai ==
- Indian overseas bank, Alathur Gate,
- State bank of India, Chettikulam
- Union bank of India, Chettikulam
- Union bank of India, Padalur
- Union bank of India, Melamaiyur
- Canara bank, Kulakkanatham

== Sports Team in Mavilangai ==
Cricket: Trouble creators cricket club.

== List Of Sub Villages in Mavalingai ==
Adaikkampatti, Eachampatti, Illuppaikudi, Karaipadi, Alatur Keela Usennagaram Koothanur Kuringipadi Madura Kudikadu Makkaikulam Malayappanagar Mangalam Mangoon Marudhadi Mela Usennagaram Methal Nathakadu Nathakkadu Palambadi Palaya Viralipatti Perumalpalayam Pudhu Viralipatti Pudhuammapalayam Pudukkuruchi Rasulabath S.kudikadu Sadaikanpatti Seeranatham Seetharamapuram Siruganpur East Siruganpur West Thanganagaram Therkumadavi Thiruvalakkuruchi Thondapadi Thotiyapatti Varisaipatti Vijayagopalapuram Zamin Peraiyur
