= List of educational institutions in Perambalur district =

Perambalur is a municipality in the state of Tamil Nadu, India. It is the seat of Perambalur District/County and Perambalur Taluk (Sub-District/County). The Perambalur district is bounded on the north by Cuddalore and Salem County, south by Trichy County, east by Ariyalur County, and west by Trichy and Salem County.

== Schools ==
=== Government schools ===
- Adi Dravidar High School, Kalarampatti
- Government Girls High School, Labbaikudikkadu
- Government High School, Ammapalayam
- Government High School, Azure (Perambalur)
- Government High School, Chettikulam
- Government High School, Cuddalore
- Government High School, Esanai Panchayat
- Government High School, Kadur
- Government High School, Kaikalathur
- Government High School, Karugudi
- Government High School, Kavulpalayam Panchayat
- Government High School, Keelapuliyur
- Government High School, Kurumbalur
- Government High School, Ladapuram Panchayat
- Government High School, Mela Puliyur
- Government High School, Melappuliyur Panchayat
- Government High School, Murugankudi
- Government High School, Nakkasalem
- Government High School, Nannai
- Government High School, North Madhavi
- Government High School, Paravai
- Government High School, Peelwadi
- Government High School, Perali
- Government High School, Poolambadi
- Government High School, Ranjan Gudi
- Government High School, Thambiranpatti
- Government High School, Tungapuram Panchayat
- Government High School, V. Kalathur
- Government High school, Valikandapuram
- Government High School, Varakur
- Government High School, Veppanthattai
- Government Men's High School, Labbaikudikkadu
- Government Middle School, Nakkasalem
- Government Model High School, Kilumathur
- Government Primary School, Labbaikudikkadu
- Panchayat Union Middle School, Kottavasal

=== Government aided schools ===
- Chidambaram Middle School, Chinnavenmani
- Maulana High School, Perambalur
- Nehru High School, Eraiyur
- R.C. St. John's High School, Perambalur
- Salamat Middle School, Labbaikudikkadu
- St. Dominic's Girls' High School, Perambalur
- Thanthai Hans Roever higher Secondary School, Perambalur
- Thanthai Roever Elementary School, Perambalur

=== Private schools ===
- Annai Matriculation High School, Badalur Panchayat
- Arivalayam High School, Nakkasalem
- Arudra Vidyalaya Matriculation High School, Department Mangalam
- Dhanalakshmi Srinivasan Matriculation High School (English medium)
- Dhanalakshmi Srinivasan Matriculation High School (state education system)
- Dhanalakshmi Srinivasan Matriculation High School (Tamil medium)
- Eden Garden Metric High School, Venkanur
- Eden Garden Metric High School, Venkanur (state education system)
- Golden Gates Matriculation Higher Secondary School, Perambalur
- Green Park Matriculation Higher Secondary School
- Hans Roever Public School (CBSE), Perambalur
- Hayagriva Matriculation High School, Nakkasalem
- Labbaikkudikkadu Wisdom Matriculation High School, Ayan Peraiyur
- Nalanda High School, Perambalur
- Panimalar High School, Perambalur
- Rajavignesh High School, Melamathur Panchayat
- Shanti Niketan Matriculation High School, Arumbavoor
- Sri Raghavendra High School, Arumbavoor
- Sri Ramakrishna Matriculation High School, Perambalur
- St. Andrews Metric High School, Thirumanthurai
- St. Joseph's Matriculation Higher Secondary School, Perambalur.
- St. Valanar Matriculation High School, Elambalur Panchayat
- Swamy Vivekananda Matric.Hr.Sec School, keelapuliyur
- Thanthai Roever High School & Primary School, Indira Nagar
- Thanthai Roever Higher Secondary School, Nerkunam
- Thanthai Roever Matriculation Higher Secondary School, Perambalur
- Van Pukal Valluvar High School, Odiyam Panchayat
