= Keelakkanavai =

Village in Tamil Nadu, India

Keezhakkanavai or Keelakkanavai is a small village in Perambalur district, Tamil Nadu, India. It is situated between Perambalur and Chettikulam, around 10 km from Perambalur.

== Economy and services ==
Agriculture is the most important economic activity. As no river passes by the village, people store rainwater in lakes and ponds, which is helpful during the summer. People use well water for irrigation and drinking.

It has one Post office which serves three villages (Renganathapuram, Tambiranpatti and keelakkanavai) nearby and few provisional stores to fulfil the peoples daily needs. Also there is Part time Fair price shop (Civil supply) operating from 4 September 2010.

== Temples ==
The most famous temple is called Mariyamman Temple. There are also many temples in and around Keezhakkanavai. Sirvachur Madhura kali amman temple and Chettikulam Murugan temple are very popular. There is some yearly festival like Amman Thiruvizha, Deewali and pongal are celebrated.

== Schools and colleges ==
As of June 2011, construction was expected to begin on a Central Government Polytechnic College.

Numerous colleges and schools are being built in and around the village. There are Government schools and Matriculation schools in and around Keezhakkanavai. Dhanalakshmi Srinivan Engg. college is nearby in the village Aranarai(Perambalur), which is 5 km from Keezhakkanavai. Sri Ramakrishna Matriculation school at Perambalur which is about 8 km from Keezhakkanavai.

== People ==
The majority of the people who live in Keezhakkanavai are original South Indian people. All of them have Tamil as their primary language.

== Transportation ==
It has more or less an hour away from the town. There are buses from Perambalur to Keezhakkanavai. The major city bus is 9,9A,9B and two other government buses and additionally regularly one Chennai bus from Chettikulam to Chennai via Keezhakkanavai. Private buses are Dhanalakshmi Srinivan Transport, Renganathan Transport, Palanimurugan Transport and SKP Transport.

=== Roads ===
- Perambalur-Chettikulam
- Perambalur-Chettikulam-Thuraiyur
- Perambalur-Chettikulam-Trichy
- Chettikulam-Perambalur-Chennai

=== Train ===
- Ariyalur
- Trichy ( It is well connected by rail to major cities like Chennai, Bangalore, Cochin, coimbatore).

== Nearby cities and towns ==
- Trichy—48 km away
- Salem—105 km away
- Thuraiyur—34 km away
- Chettikulam—12 km away
- Ariyalur—38 km away
