= Elanthankuzhi =

Elanthankuzhi Elanthan Kuzhi
- village
- Nickname: ELK
- Location in Tamil Nadu, India Elanthankuzhi (India)
- Coordinates: 11.14274°N 79.030795°E
- Country: India
- State: Tamil Nadu
- District: Permabalur

Population (2001)
  - Total: 3,500

Languages
  - Official: Tamil
- Time zone: UTC+5:30 (IST)
- PIN: 621 713
- Vehicle registration: TN 46

Elanthankuzhi is a local Panchayat in Alathur Taluk, Perambalur District, Tamil Nadu state, India. The town is located 17 km from the Taluk administrative office, and 24 km from the district headquarters in Perambalur. The nearest city is Ariyalur (6 km). The state capital Chennai is 290 km distant.

The Elanthankuzhi panchayat includes the villages Elanthankuzhi and Siranatham.

The Elanthankuzhi pin code is 621713. The postal head office is Kunnam (Perambalur).

Koothur ( 3 km ), Pilimisai ( 4 km ), Gudalur ( 5 km ), Adhanur ( 5 km ), Kottarai ( 6 km ) are the nearest villages to Elanthankuzhi. Elanthankuzhi is surrounded by Alathur taluk towards the west, Veppur taluk towards the north, Perambalur taluk towards the west, Sendurai taluk towards the east .

== Demographics ==
Tamil is the local language.

== Politics ==
DMK, AIADMK, PMK, NTK are the major political parties in this area.

Polling stations / booths near Elanthankuzhi West School:

1)Panchayat Union Elementary School Building Terraced East West Building East Portion North Facing 2)Panchayat Union Elementary School East West Terreaced Building Ssa South Facing East Side 3)Panchayat Union Elementary School West East Terraced Building North Facing 4)Panchayat Union Middle School Main Tiled Building West Portion South Facing 5)Panchayat Union Middle School North South Terraced Ssa Building East Facing South Portion Alathiyur

== Transport connections ==
By Rail: Ariyalur Railway Station (nearly 6 km) and Sillakkudi Railway Station are the closest railway stations to Elanthankuzhi. Thanjavar Railway Station is a major railway station (50 km from Elanthankuzhi.

== Education ==
Colleges near Elanthankuzhi: Government Arts College (Ariyalur); Government Medical College and Hospital (Ariyalur); Dhanalakshmi Srinivasan Medical College and Hospital; Dhanalakshmi Srinivasan Engineering and Arts & Science College; Rover College; and Varatharaja Group of Education Institutes.

Secondary school: PUMS Elanthankuzhi (west) (Elanthankuzhi, Alathur, Perambalur, Tamil Nadu. PIN- 621708. Post: Kunnam (Perambalur))

Elanthankuzhi also has government primary and middle schools.
