= K.Pudur Village =

K.Pudur village K.Pudur
- Village
- Location in K.Pudur village, Perambalur, Tamil Nadu, India
- Coordinates: 11°18′43.13″N 78°57′58.32″E
- Country: India
- State: Tamil Nadu
- District: Perambalur

Area
  - Total: 3 km^{2} (1.2 sq mi)

Population (2011)
  - Total: 1,300
  - Density: 430/km^{2} (1,100/sq mi)

Languages
  - Official: Tamil
- Time zone: UTC+5:30 (IST)
- PIN: 621115
- Telephone code: 04328
- Vehicle registration: TN-46
- Website: K.Pudur Village's Official Website
- K.Pudur Village's Official

K.Pudur village a small village in the district of Perambalur, Tamil Nadu, India.

== Geography ==
K.Pudur Village is located at 11.311980°N 78.966200°E, with an elevation of 108 ft.

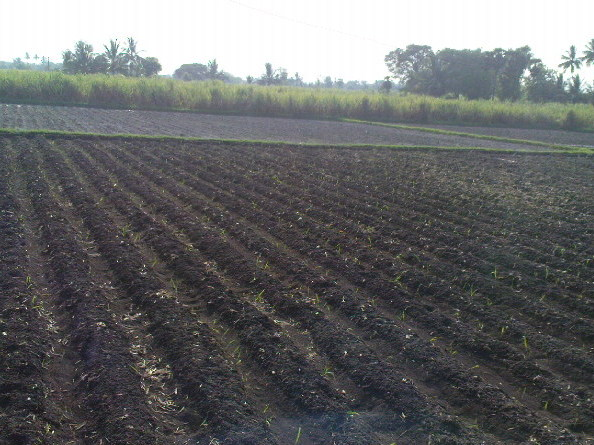
Agriculture is the main occupation of the people in K.Pudur Village

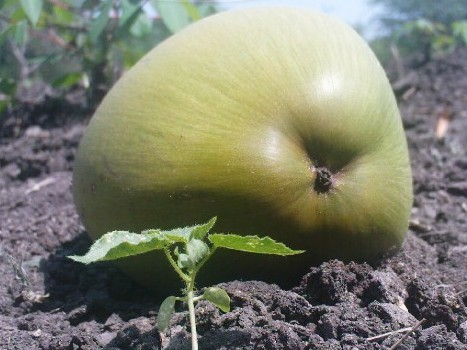
Agriculture is the main occupation of the people in K.Pudur Village

== Economy ==
Currently, the economy of K.Pudur Village relies on cultivation. Major local crops include sugarcane, tapioca, and maize.

== Temples and festivals ==
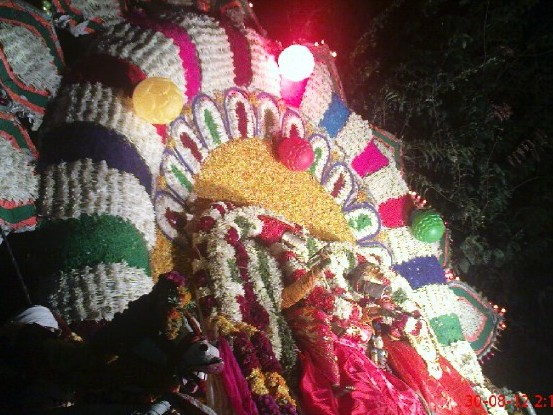
K.Pudur Village Mariamman Temple festival celebrations

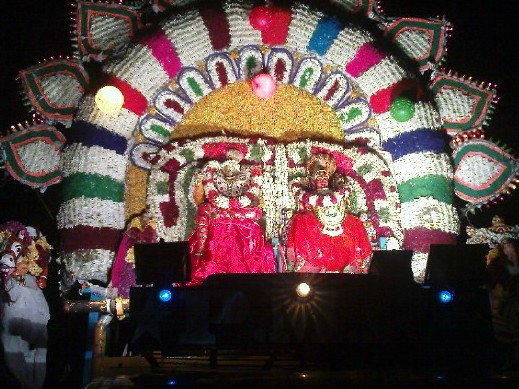
K.Pudur Village Mariamman Temple festival celebrations

The village houses several temples, including:

- Mariamman temple
- Vinayagar temple
- Murugan temple
- Sivan temple
- Perumal temple
- Selliamman temple
- Ayyanar temple
- Karuppusamy temple

Festivals hosted at these temples are central cultural events for the community.

== Agriculture and major crops ==
Rice and sugarcane are grown as major commercial crops. The predominant soil in the district is red sanding with scattered packers of black soil. This village consists mainly of glade soil. The soil in the district is best suited for raising dry crops. Cotton also grown in many places.

- Rice (vast tracts)
- Sugarcane(vast tracts)
- Tapioca(vast tracts)
- Corn
- Cotton (vast tracts)
- Groundnut/peanut
- Banana/plantain
- Coconut
- Black Gram
- Millet

== Gallery of K.Pudur Village ==
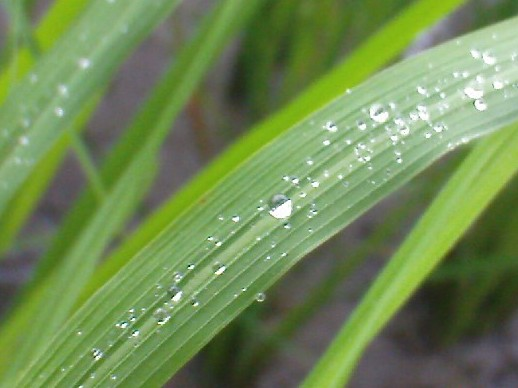
K.Pudur Village Agroforestry

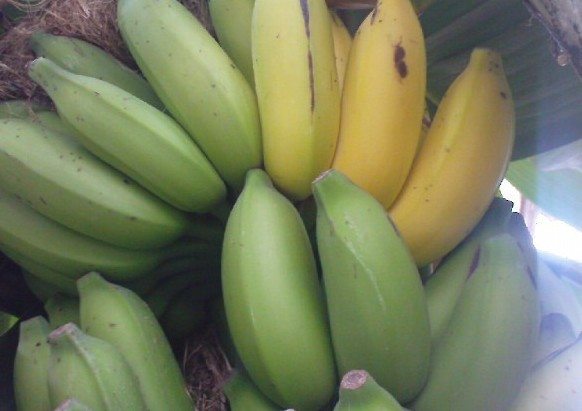
K.Pudur Village Banana tree showing fruits

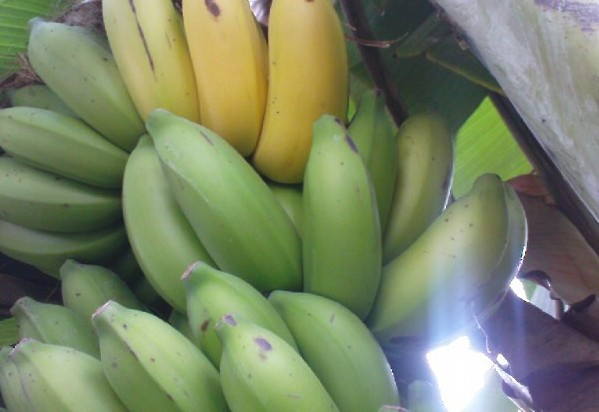
K.Pudur Village Banana tree showing fruits

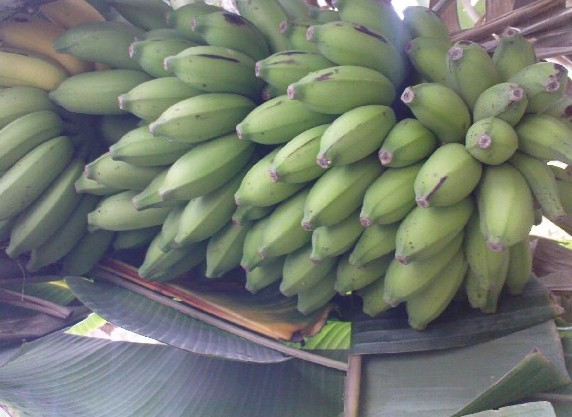
K.Pudur Village Banana tree showing fruits

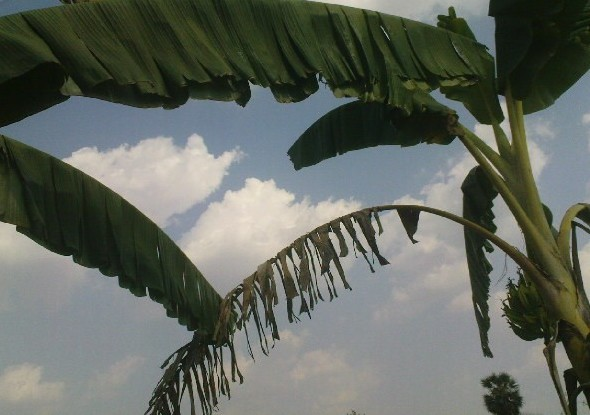
K.Pudur Village Banana tree plantation leaves

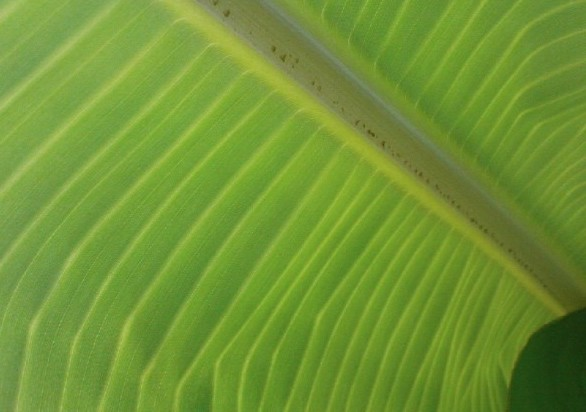
K.Pudur Village Banana Leaf

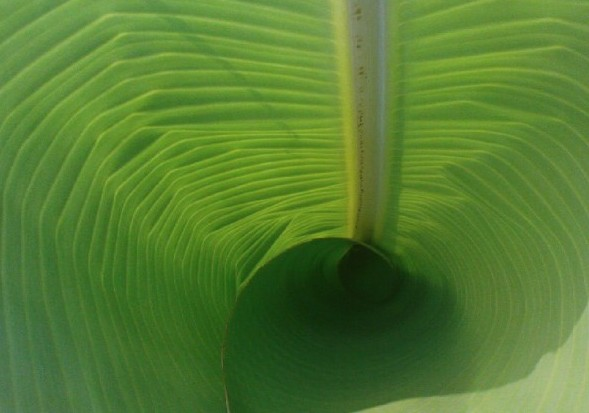
K.Pudur Village Banana Leaf

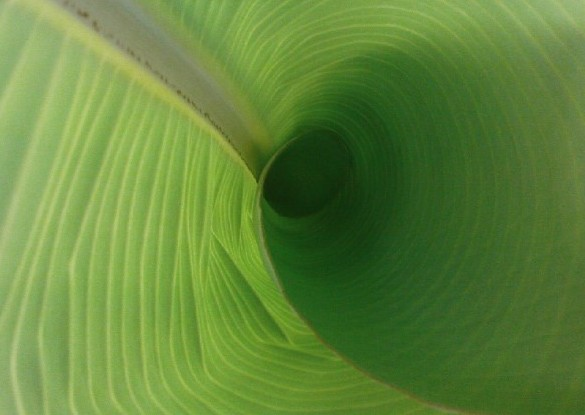
K.Pudur Village Banana Leaf

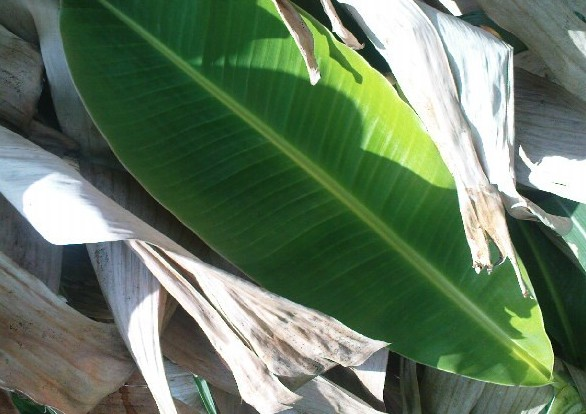
K.Pudur Village Banana Leaf

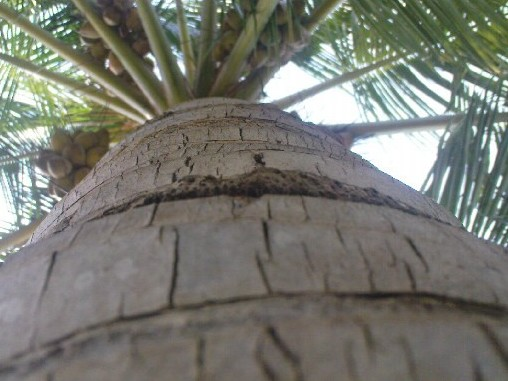
K.Pudur Village Coconut tree

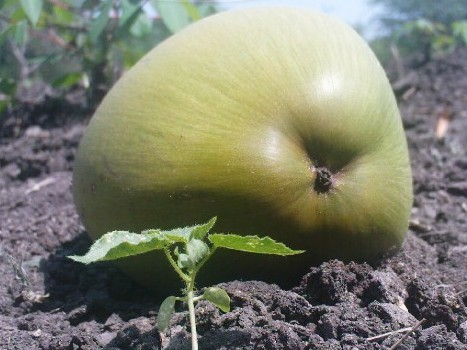
K.Pudur Village Coconut

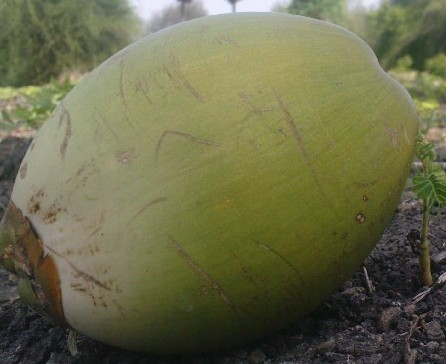
K.Pudur Village Coconut

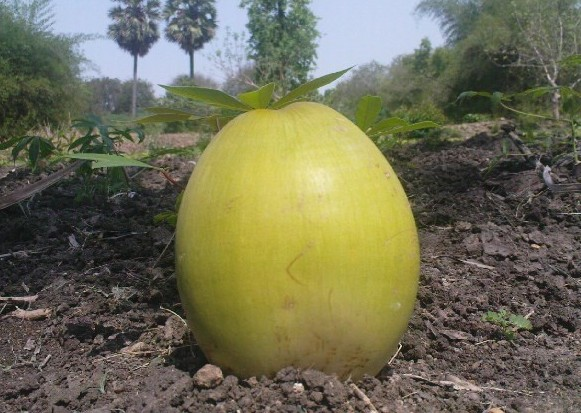
K.Pudur Village Coconut

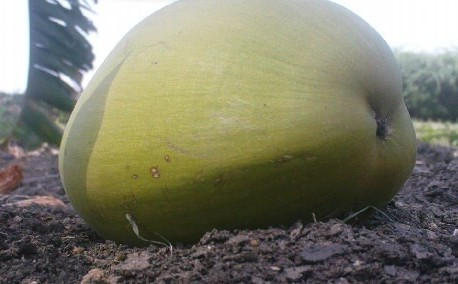
K.Pudur Village Coconut

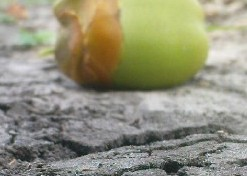
K.Pudur Village Coconut

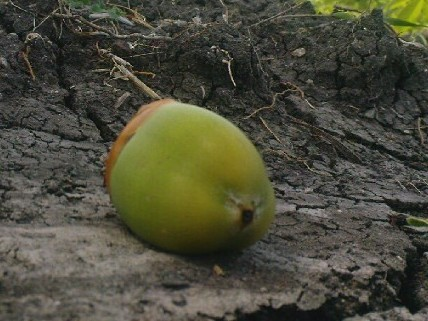
K.Pudur Village Coconut

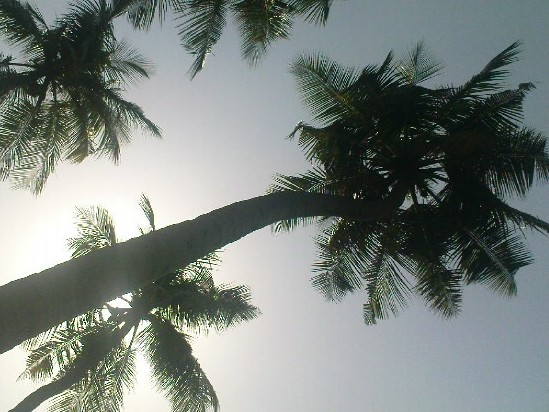
K.Pudur Village Coconut trees

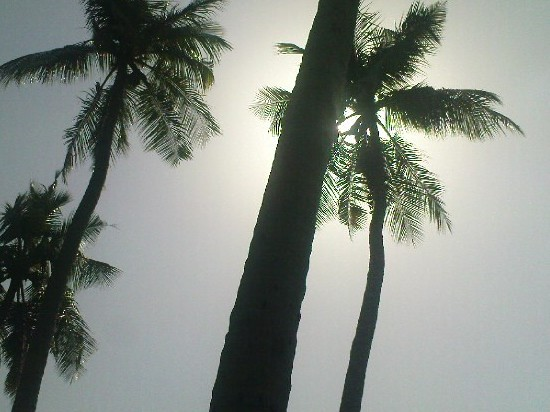
K.Pudur Village Coconut trees

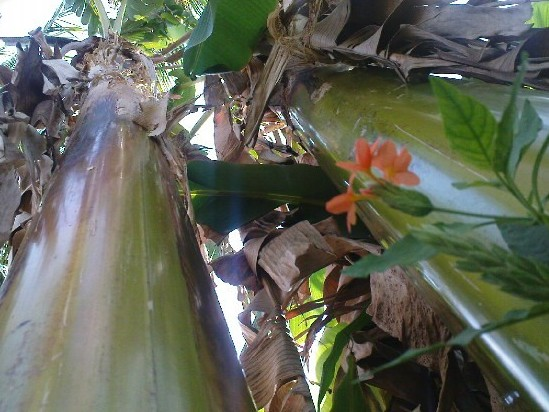
K.Pudur Village Firecracker Flower and banana trees

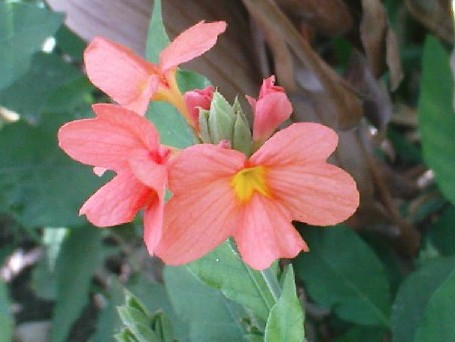
K.Pudur Village Firecracker Flower

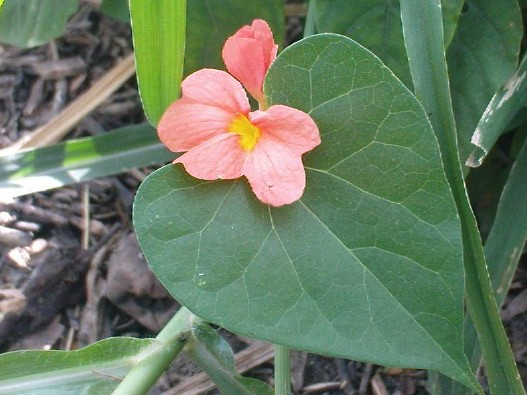
K.Pudur Village Firecracker Flower

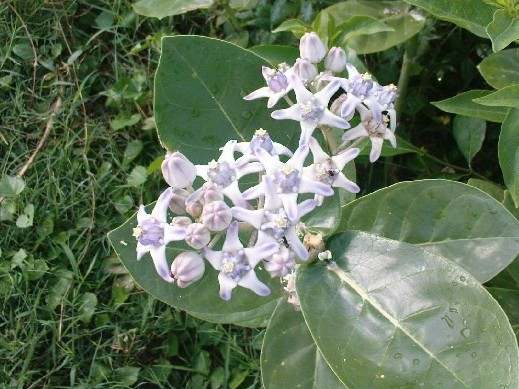
K.Pudur Village Crown flower plants

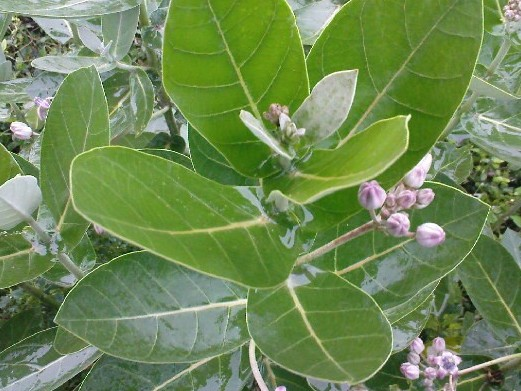
K.Pudur Village Crown flower plants

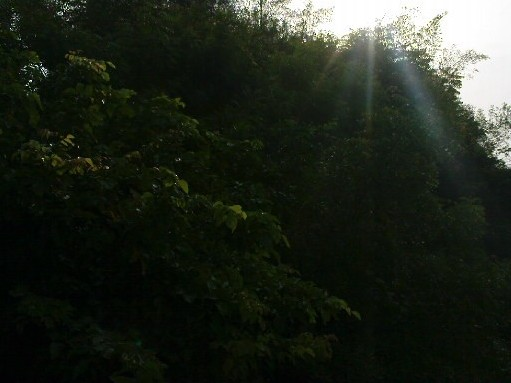
K.Pudur Village Green trees

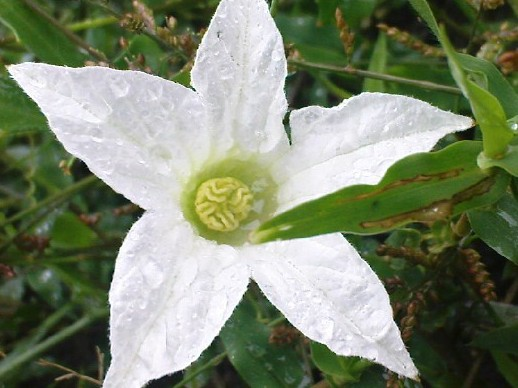
K.Pudur Village Five Star Flower

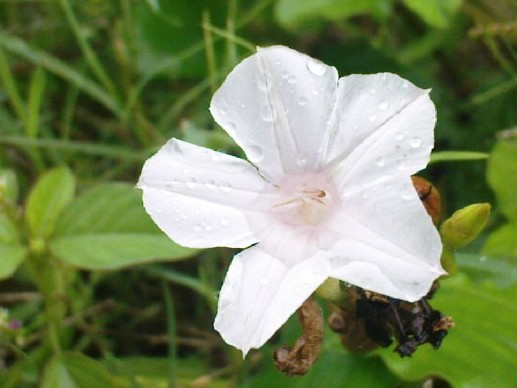
K.Pudur Village Five Star White Flower

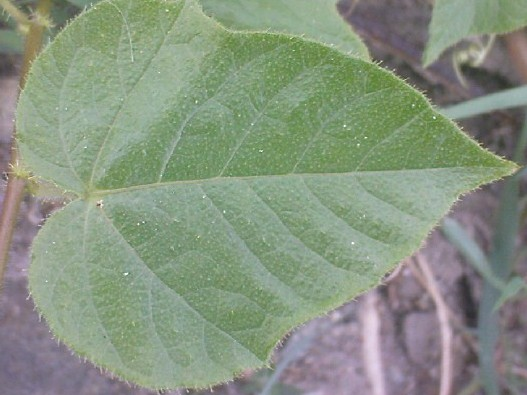
K.Pudur Village Green plants

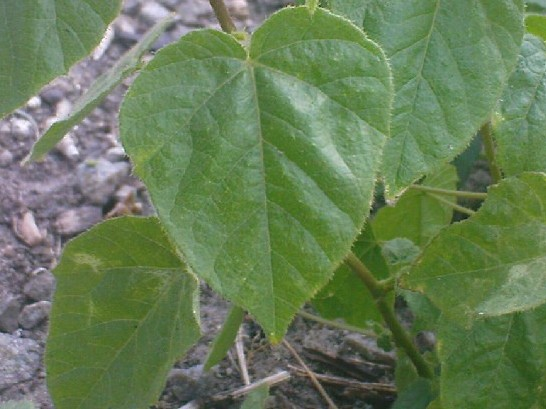
K.Pudur Village Green plants

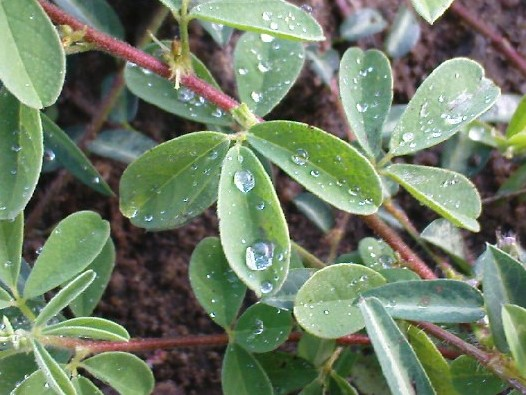
K.Pudur Village Green plants dew point

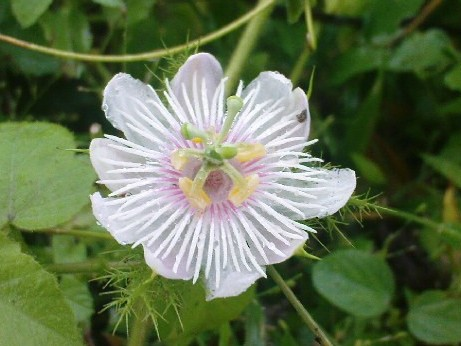
K.Pudur Village White Flower

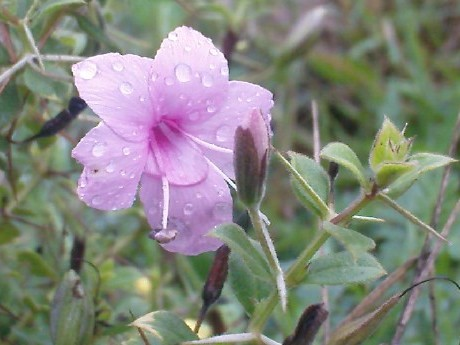
K.Pudur Village Pink thorn flower

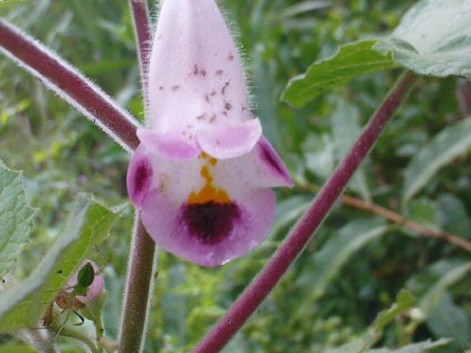
K.Pudur Village Pink Flower

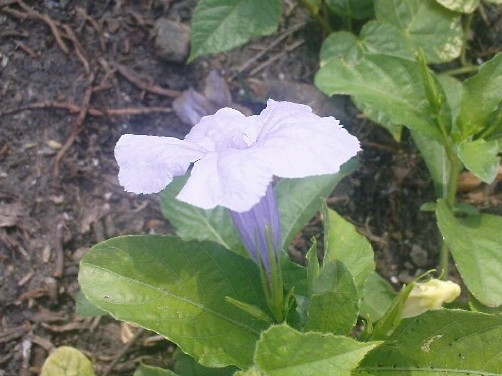
K.Pudur Village slateblue Flower

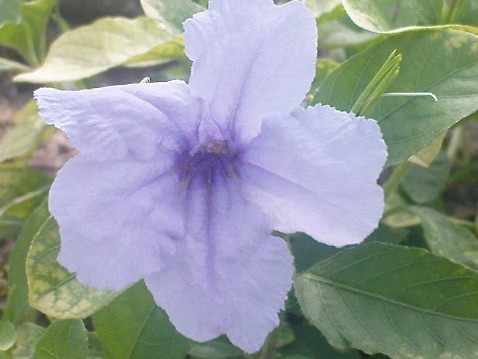
K.Pudur Village slateblue Flower

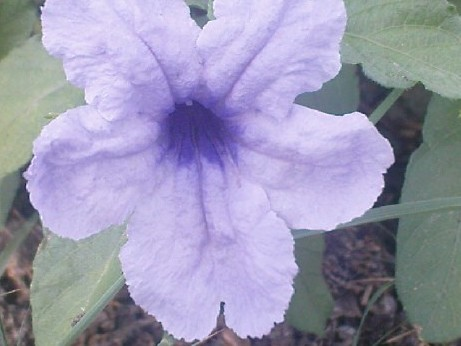
K.Pudur Village slateblue Flower

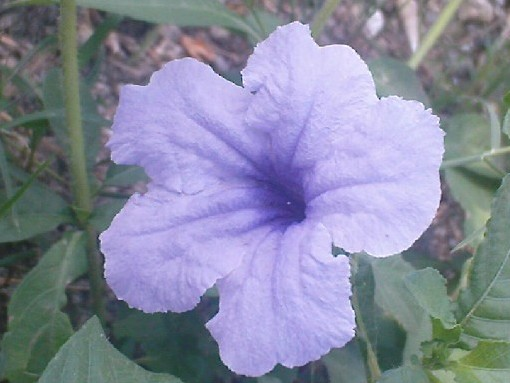
K.Pudur Village slateblue Flower

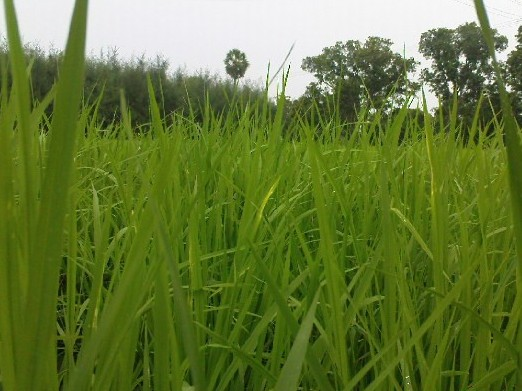
K.Pudur Village Paddy Crop

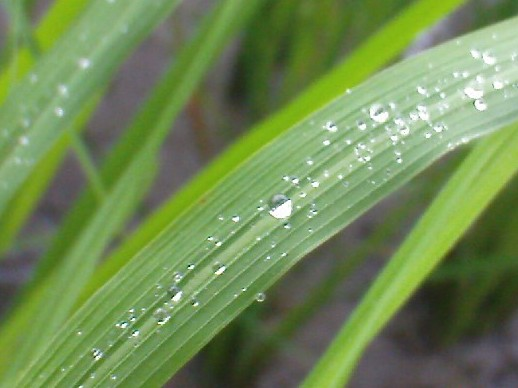
K.Pudur Village Paddy Crop

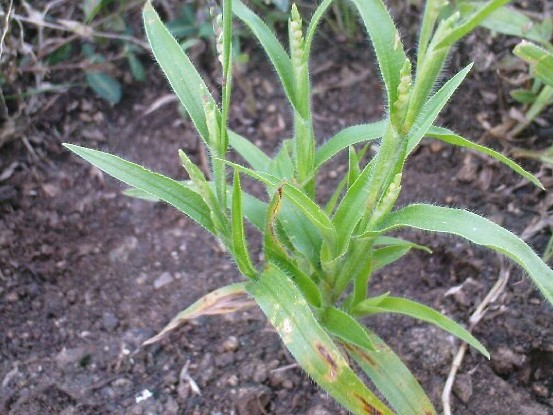
K.Pudur Village Meadows

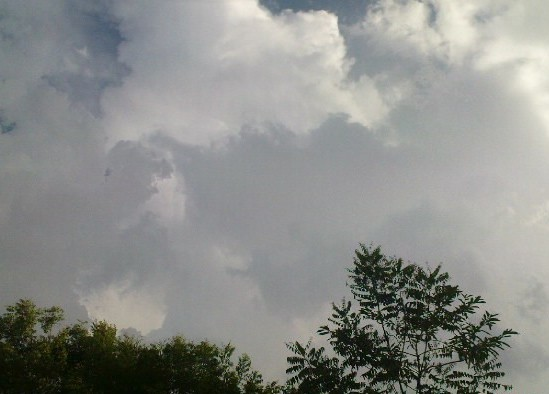
K.Pudur Village Clouds at Noon time

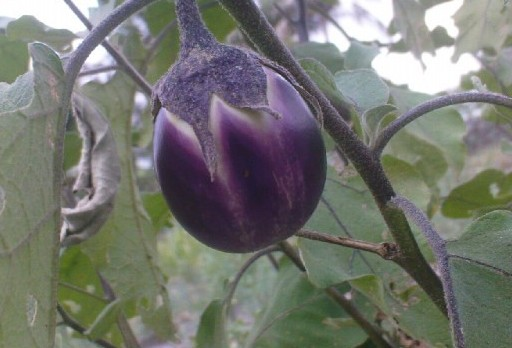
K.Pudur Village brinjal plants

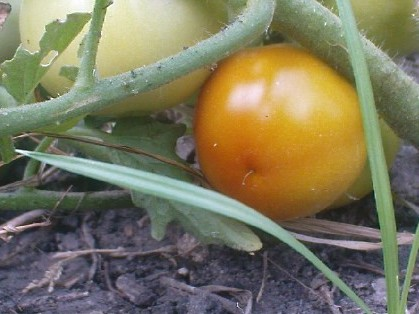
K.Pudur Village Tomato Plant

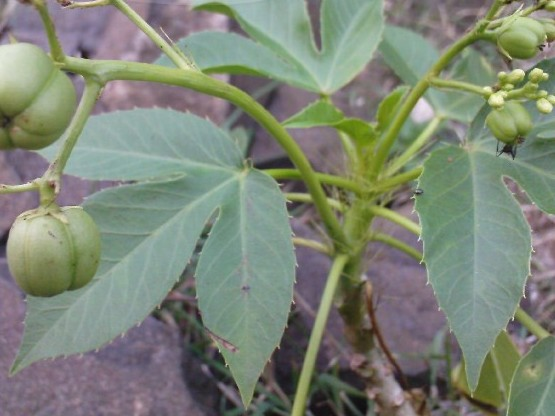
K.Pudur Village Jatropha curcas

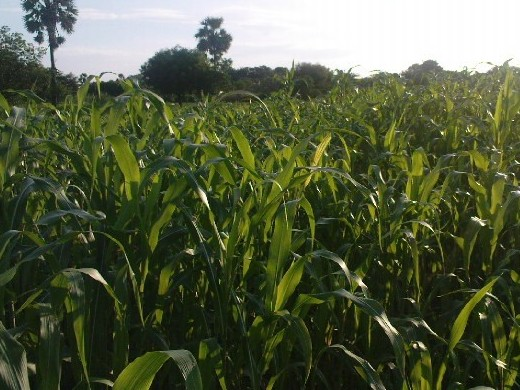
K.Pudur Village Corn plants

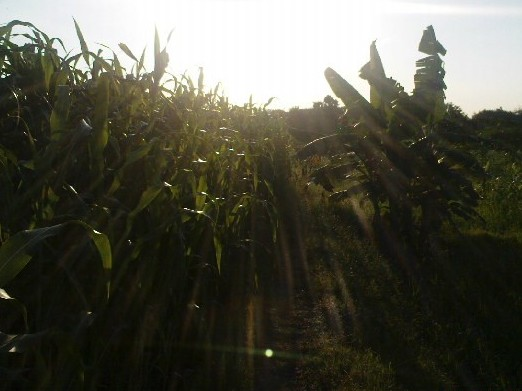
K.Pudur Village Corn plants

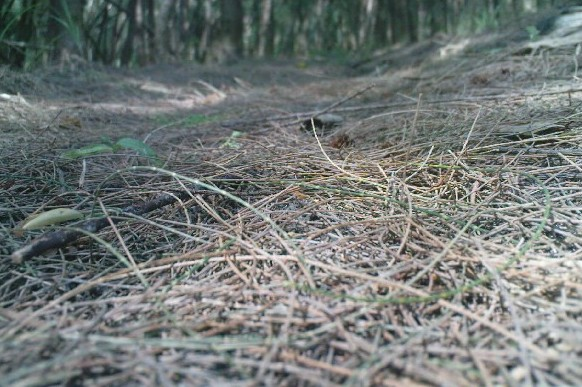
K.Pudur Village Casuarina Grove

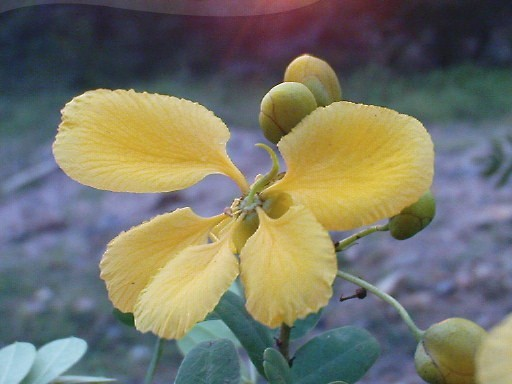
K.Pudur Village Avaram Senna

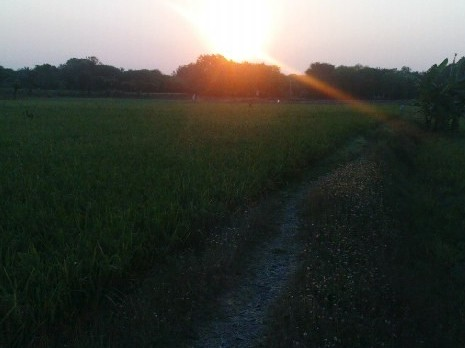
K.Pudur Village Sunset Time

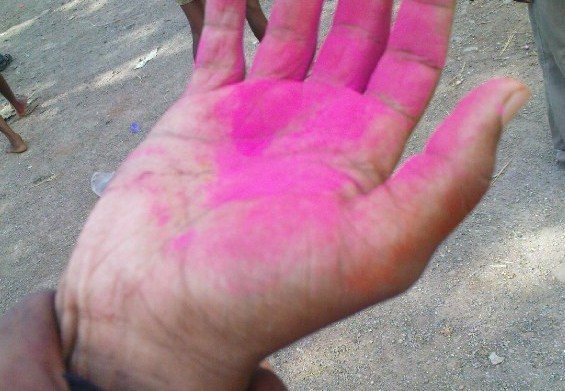
K.Pudur Village Celebrating the festival of color

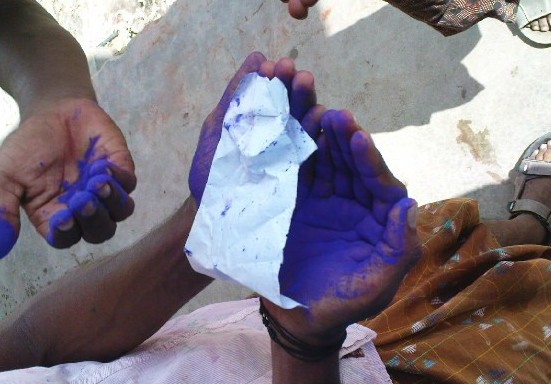
K.Pudur Village Celebrating the festival of color

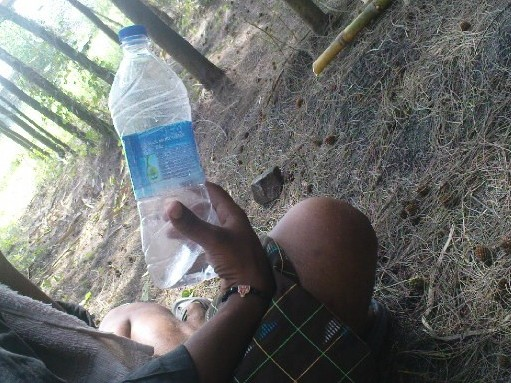
K.Pudur Village Tamil hand

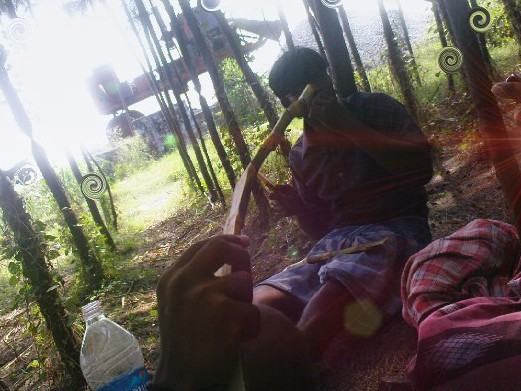
K.Pudur Village New Look

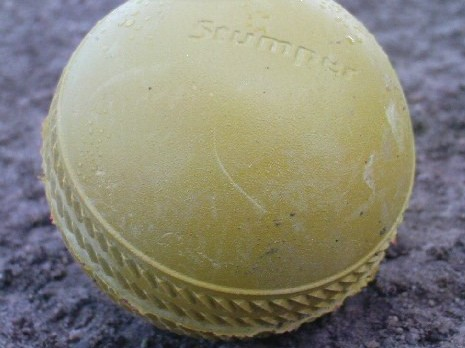
K.Pudur Village Yellow Cricket ball

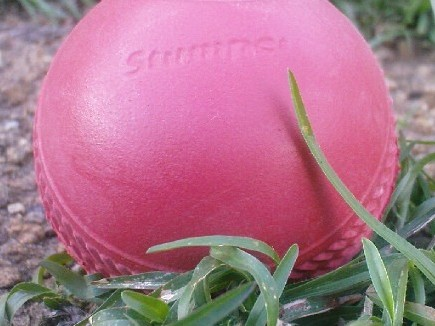
K.Pudur Village Rose Cricket ball

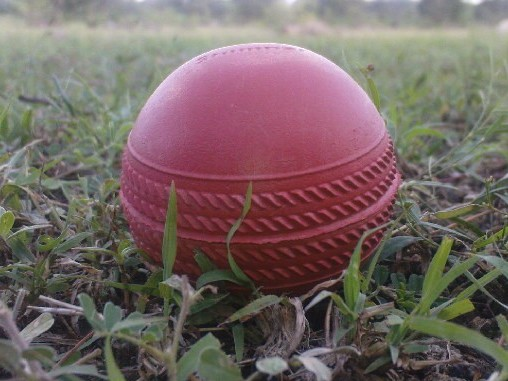
K.Pudur Village Rose Cricket ball

== See also ==
- List of villages in Perambalur district
