= Elambalur =

- Village
- Location in Tamil Nadu, India
- Coordinates: 11.267285°N 78.881267°E
- Country: India
- State: Tamil Nadu
- District: Perambalur (பெரம்பலூர் மாவட்டம்)

Population (2001)
  - Total: 7,363

Languages
  - Official: Tamil
- Time zone: UTC+5:30 (IST)
- PIN: 621212
- Telephone code: 4328
- Vehicle registration: TN46
- Website: wikimapia.org/13462523/Elambalur

Elambalur is the nearest village to Perambalur (3.6 km) and to NH-45 road (2 km). It is a special village in Perambalur district, Tamil Nadu, India. It includes the hamlet villages of Indira Nagar, MGR nagar, MahathmaGandhi Nagar, Samathuvapuram and Nethaji Nagar.

== Climatic conditions ==
- Climate: Tropical
- Category: Medium and High Region
- Rainfall: Around 908 mm
- Precipitation: 45–50%

== Geography ==
Elambalur is located at 11.26°N 78.88°E, elevation 436 ft. The pachaimalai (green hill) Eastern ghats starts from here.

The geographical location of Elambalur:

== Government offices and institutions ==
- SIDCO Industrial Estate
- The RTO-Perambulur (TN-46)
- Armed Reserve Police Campus
- District TASMAC go-down
- District Cooperative Agri-Marketing Committee
- Govt. Primary Health Center

== Economy ==
Stone quarries, mining, and Stone Crushing are major industries in Elambalur. However, a majority of the people work in agriculture and engaged in building constructions jobs

SIDCO will soon be setting up an Industrial Estate at the Elambalur Village. Approval of site measuring 44.4 acres at Elambalur has been completed for SIDCO Project.

- Major crops : Paddy rice, maize, millet, sugarcane, tapioca, cotton, onion, chill peppers and groundnuts in the Perambalur District Area, including Elambalur.

== Politics ==
Perambalur assembly constituency former member (MLA) Tamilselvan M.A belongs to Elambalur village. He was elected in the recent Assembly election conducted by Election commission of India. From 1986 to 2001 Mr.M.Rajaram won in all local body elections and served as president and union chairman. He developed Elambalur panchayat to a city level. It is a part of the Perambalur (Lok Sabha constituency)

== Transport ==
Recently the government of Tamil Nadu operated a new express bus service to Chennai from Elambalur every day.

== Educational institutions ==
- Government Higher Secondary school
- Thanthai Hans Roever High school
- Roever college of Engineering
- Roever College of Engineering and Technology
- Thanthai Roever College of Arts & science
- Thanthai Hans Roever college of Nursing
- Thanthai Hans Roever college for B.Ed. courses
- Thanthai Hans Roever college of Agriculture
- Thanthai Hans Roever College of Physiotherapy
- Thanthai Hans Roever College of Pharmacy
- Thanthai Hans Roever Institute of Medical Laboratory Technology
- Roever Industrial Training Institute
- Saint Joseph's Matric. Hr. Sec. School

== See also ==
- Perambalur
- Pachaimalai Hills

== Notes ==
- indiawater.gov.in "Elambalur and its Hamlet villages"
- "censusindia.gov.in"
- "Rough stone Quarry leases granted in Elambalur"
- "Regarding the Holy Sidhas"
- "Samathuvapuram, Hamlet of Elambalur"
- "Industrial Estate in Elambalur"
- TANSIDCO|SIDCO Govt.Industrial Policy
- "Govt, Official site for villages"
