= Namaiyur =

Namaiyur Namaiyur sirumathur
- Village
- Nickname: Small Singapore
- Location in Namaiyur, Perambalur, Tamil Nadu, India Namaiyur (India)
- Coordinates: 11°19′29″N 78°58′31″E
- Country: India
- State: Tamil Nadu
- District: Perambalur (பெரம்பலூர் மாவட்டம்)
- Established: 04/05/1889

Government
  - Type: small village
  - Body: Grama panchayat

Area
  - Total: 1 km^{2} (0.39 sq mi)

Population (3000)
  - Total: 3,000
  - Density: 3,000/km^{2} (7,800/sq mi)

Languages
  - Official: Tamil
- Time zone: UTC+5:30 (IST)
- PIN: 621133
- Telephone code: 04328

Namaiyur is a small village part of Kunnam Taluk, Perambalur, Tamil Nadu, India. The nearby places are Trichy and Ariyalur. Here nature of work is agriculture only.

== Geography ==
Namaiyur Village is located at 11.324803°N 78.975515°E, elevation 108 ft.

== Economy ==
Currently, Namaiyur Village is the top Sugarcane, Tapioca, maize, turmeric, onions, etc.

== Temples and Festivals ==
Namaiyur has Some temples and places In this temple the festival is a very most famous festival around this area, similar to the.

- Mariamman temple
- Vinayagar temple
- Sivan temple
- Perumal temple
- Selliamman temple
- Karuppusamy temple
- Aakasa thurai temple
- Kaattu Ayyanar temple
- Periyandavar temple
- Oorsuthiyan temple
- Om shakthi temple

== Agriculture and Major Crops ==
Rice and Sugar cane are grown as a major commercial crop. The predominant soil in the district is red sanding with scattered packers of black soil. This village consists mainly of glade soil. The soil in the district is best suited for raising dry crops. Cotton also grown in many places.

- Rice (vast tracts)
- Sugarcane(vast tracts)
- Tapioca(vast tracts)
- Corn
- Cotton (vast tracts)
- Groundnut/peanut
- Banana/plantain
- Coconut
- Black Gram
- Millet
