= V.Kalathur =

V Kalathur
- Panchayat village
- Tamil Nadu, Republic of India V Kalathur (India)
- Coordinates: 11.40°N 78.88°E
- Country: India
- State: Tamil Nadu
- District: Perambalur district
- Elevation: 143 m (469 ft)

Population (2011)
  - Total: 9,230

Languages
  - Official: Tamil, English
- Time zone: UTC+5:30 (IST)
- Postal code: 621117
- Area code: 04328
- Website: www.vkalathur.in/vkalathurexpress.in

V Kalathur is a village in Veppanthattai taluk of Perambalur district, Tamil Nadu, India. It lies at a distance of 28 km to the north of the district headquarters Perambalur. Nearest Airport is Tiruchirappalli Airport, situated at a distance of 85 km from the village.

== Location ==
The village is located at 28 km to the north of Perambalur and 8 km west of NH 45 which links Perambalur and Chennai. River "Kallaru" runs through the village bisecting it into two parts. The northern part is called Vannaarampoondi and Millath nagar, and the southern part commonly called V.Kalathur.

== Demographics ==
According to the 2011 census, V.Kalathur had a population of 9230 with 4649 males and 4581 females. There are almost 6 big temples and 5 small temples in and around v kalathur, rayappa nagar, vannarampoondi, the big Sivan temple which is located in v kalathur and one medium size Sivan temple is located in the entrance of vannarampoondi, another traditional temple of selliamman temple, karumari Amman temple located in v kalathur& there is a Demigod temple which is named as Rayappa temple, karuppaiah temple located in v kalathur and vannarampoondi, very old historical perumal temple located in vannarampoondi, and six mosques in the village.

== Agriculture ==
The main occupation in this area is agriculture. Agriculture here primarily depends on Seasonal Rainfall. Major Crops grown here are Maize and Cotton. Other Crops include Sugarcane, Paddy and Turmeric.

== Transport ==
There are several Government and Private Buses connecting the village with Perambalur Town and Trichy. There are also Two Government buses operated by TNSTC - Salem connecting the village with Attur, Salem District. Mini Buses link the Village with nearest small villages. Also, frequent buses available to Chennai and other Southern districts of Tamil Nadu from Thozhudhur Toll Plaza which is situated at 10 km from the Village.

== Education and economy ==
The village has a government higher Secondary School and five private schools which provide primary education to the locals. There are also schools and colleges in Perambalur and surrounding villages which provide transport facilities to the village. There are two banks operating in the village - Indian Overseas Bank and TDCC. Axis Bank ATM, Indian Overseas Bank ATM and several private ATM's are available.
