= Brahmadesam (Bhavani) =

Panchayat village in India

Coordinates: 11.544945°N 77.580315°E

Brahmadesam is an Indian Panchayat village located in Anthiyur taluk of Erode district in the state of Tamil Nadu. According to the 2001 census, the village had a population of 12074, with a literacy rate of 52.33%.
