= Anukkur =

Village in Tamil Nadu, India

Coordinates: 11.332°N 78.864°E

Anukkur also known as Anupuram is a village located in the southern part of India. It is also a gram panchayat located in Veppanthatti taluk, Perambalur district and state of Tamil Nadu.

== Population ==
According to the 2011 census, The population of Anukkur is 3093 with 1131 households. 48.4% of them are male and 51.6% of them are female.

== Demography ==
People who lives in Anukkur are mostly Hindus. Most of them speak Tamil. 0.1% of the population is from scheduled tribe, 16.5% of the population is from scheduled caste and rest of the population is backward and most backward community.

== Literacy ==
The Literacy rate of Anukkur is 57.5% and 57% of them are working population. Most of them are farmers and some of them are daily wages.
