= Vengalam =

- town
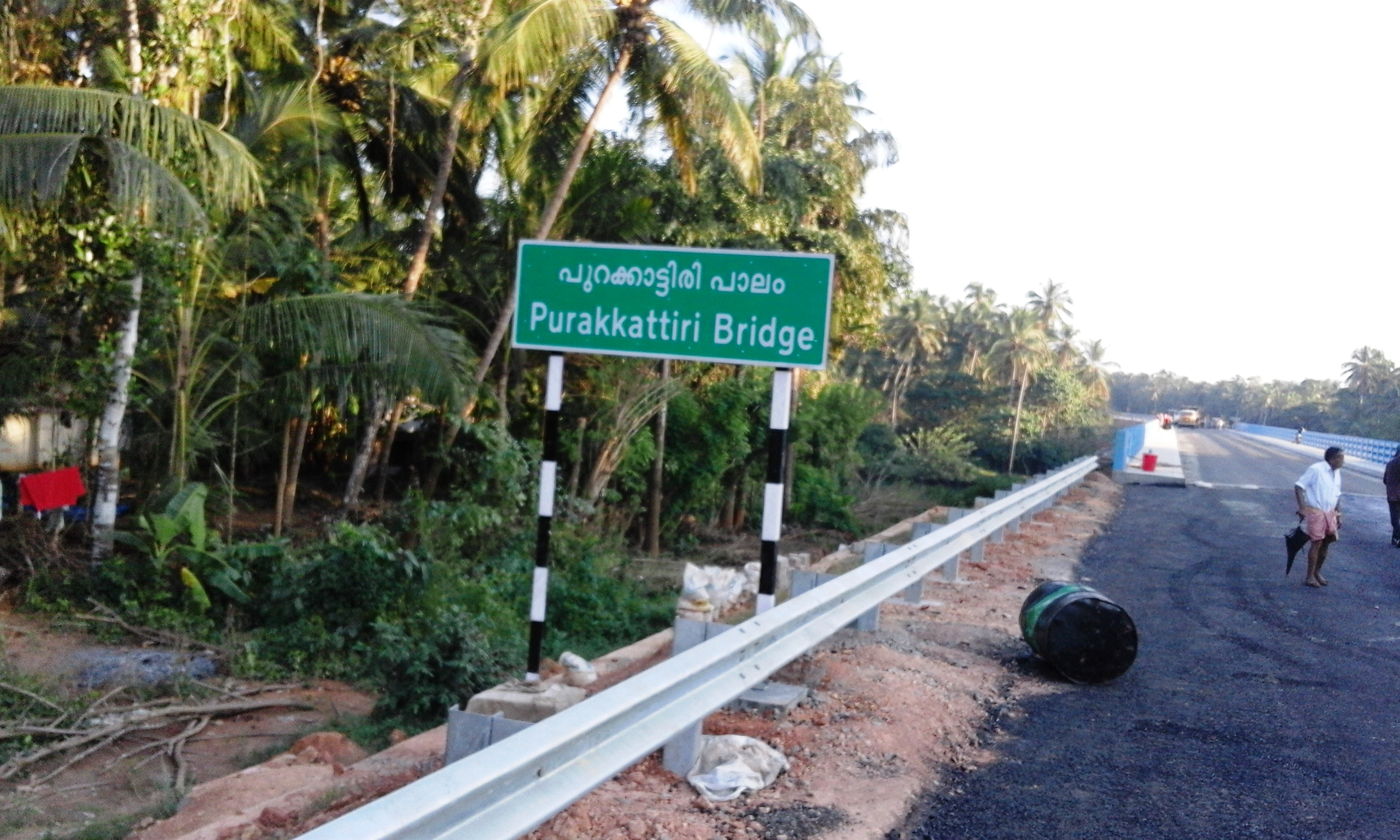
- Purakkattiri Bridge

- Location in Kerala, India
- Coordinates: 11°21′0″N 75°44′0″E
- Country: India
- State: Kerala
- District: Kozhikode

Languages
  - Official: Malayalam, English
- Time zone: UTC+5:30 (IST)
- Vehicle registration: KL-

Vengalam is a town in Kerala, India, approximately 10 km from Kozhikode Railway Station (Calicut City) and very near Kappad Beach. The landmark is the Railway Overbridge inaugurated by Chief Minister V. S. Achuthanandan. This 433-metre bridge was constructed at a cost of Rs.4.59 crores and was a boon for the frequent travellers through the national Highway 17 from Kozhikode to Kannur.

== The New Vengalam Junction ==
Vengalam township has risen to importance because of the completion of the new road from Ramanattukara to Vengalam with a 30 meter width. The proposed inauguration of the road on 21 January 2016 will boost the development of the area.
