= Palaiyur =

Coordinates: 12°36′N 79°56′E

Palaiyur is a village within the Indian state of Tamil Nadu. Palaiyur is located 282 kilometers from Chennai, in Kuttalam Taluk, which is in the Mayiladuthurai district and shares close border with the Thanjavur district. The current population is just under 2,000. Nearby villages include: Peravoor, Nakkambadi, S.Pudur, Kokkur, and Srikandapuram.

Nakkambadi (2 km), Manthai (3 km), Konerirajapuram (3 km), Peravur (3 km), Kodimangalam (4 km) are the nearby villages. Palaiyur is surrounded by Kodavasal Block towards the south, Tiruvidaimarudur Block towards the west, Nannilam Block towards the east, Thiruppanandal Block towards the north.

Kumbakonam, Mayiladuthurai, Thiruvarur, Karaikal are the nearby Cities to Palaiyur.

It is in the border of the Nagapattinam District and Thanjavur District. Thanjavur District Thiruppanandal is to the north.

== Geography ==
Palaiyur Village Gram Panchayath name is Palaiyur. Palaiyur is 8 km from sub-district headquarters Kuthalam and is 14 km from district headquarters Mayiladuthurai. The nearest statutory town is Kuthalam, 8 km away. Palaiyur's total area is 327.91 hectares; non-agricultural area is 88.84 hectares and total irrigated area is 327.78 hectares.

== Demographics ==
=== Population ===
Palaiyur Local Language is Tamil. Palaiyur Village Total population is 2737 and number of houses are 699. Female Population is 49.1%. Village literacy rate is 71.7% and the Female Literacy rate is 31.3%.

Census Parameter	Census Data
Total Population	2737
Total No of Houses	699
Female Population %	49.1 % (1345)
Total Literacy rate %	71.7 % (1962)
Female Literacy rate	31.3 % (856)
Scheduled Tribes Population %	0.0 % (0)
Scheduled Caste Population %	30.1 % (823)
Working Population %	44.0 %
Child (0 -6) Population by 2011	293
Girl Child (0 -6) Population % by 2011	49.1 % (144)

== Government and politics ==
=== Health ===
Near by Govt Hospital available at near by Village Srikandapuram and a veterinary hospital at Mela Ayyanarkudi.

=== Civic Utility / Amenities / Services ===
It has a library, a Tamil Nadu Electricity Board office, a police station, a village officer office, a Tamil Nadu Civil Supplies Corporation office, an agricultural office and a RI office.

This village has a power supply with 12 hour power supply in summer and 10 hour power supply in winter, Anganwadi centre, ASHA, birth & death registration office, sports facilities, public library, daily newspaper and polling station are the other amenities in the village.

Hand pump and tube wells/boreholes are other drinking water sources.

Closed and open drainage systems are in this village. There is no system to collect garbage on street. Drain water is discharged into sewer plant.

=== Communication ===
Post Office is available in this Village. Land line phones are available. Mobile coverage is available. Nearest Internet centre is in 5 – 10 km. Private courier facility available in this village. Palaiyur Pin code is 612203 and it has Sub post office.

== Economy ==
Nearest ATM is in 1–3 km. Nearest Commercial Bank is in less than 3 km. Nearest Cooperative Bank is in 5 – 10 km. Agricultural Credit Society and Mandis/Regular Market are available in this village.

=== Agriculture ===
Paddy, sugarcane, cotton and pulses are agriculture commodities grow in this village.12 hours agricultural power supply in summer and 8 hours agricultural power supply in winter is available in this village. Total irrigated area in this village is 327.78 hectares from canals 322.78 hectares and from Boreholes/Tube wells 5 hectares are the Sources of irrigation. Rice, cotton, and corn are major commercial crops. The soil in the district is predominantly red sand, with scattered patches of black soil. The soil in Palaiyur consists mainly of glade soil; the soil in the district is best suited for raising dry crops.

Additional crops grown include bananas, coconuts, onions, turmeric, chili peppers, ground nuts, sesame, millet, carrots, lettuce, and turnips.

== Transport ==
=== By Road ===
Public and private bus services are available in this village. No nearest National Highway in less than 10 km. It is located in State Highway SH-147 which is connecting Kumbakonam-Karaikal.

It serves a main bus stop near by villages like Kanjuvoy, Nallavur and Karanur. Regular bus services are available to Mayiladuthurai, Karikal and Kumbakonam.

=== By Rail ===
Nearest railway station is in 5 – 10 km at Peralam Junction (PEM), Kumbakonam station (KUM) and Kuthalam station.

== Education ==
Government Primary Schools are in this village. The nearest higher secondary schools are in Srikantapuram. The nearest private engineering college is in Thirumangalagudi and Kumbakonam. Nearest Govt Medical College is in Thiruvarur and Thanjavur. Nearest private disabled school and private ITA College are in Mayiladuthurai. Nearest Private Polytechnic College is in Kollumangudi. Nearest Govt Arts and Science Degree College and Govt MBA college are in Kumbakonam.
