= Tamil Nadu Small Industries Development Corporation Limited =

State-agency in India promoting small-scale industries

- TANSIDCO logo
- Type: Government Industrial Estate
- Founded: 1970; 56 years ago
- Founder: Government of Tamilnadu
- Headquarters: Guindy, Chennai, India
- Number of locations: 128 Industrial Estates [41 government estates and 87 TANSIDCO estates]
- Key people: Thiru Mangat Ram Sharma IAS(M.D)
- Services: Establishing its own Industrial Estates; Assisting promotion of Private Industrial Estates; Promotion of Common Facility Centres under Cluster Development Programme; Proving technical and managerial guidance to the MSMEs; Extending raw material support &marketing support
- Owner: Government of Tamil Nadu
- Website: https://www.tansidco.org/

The Tamil Nadu Small Industries Development Corporation Limited (TANSIDCO) is a state-agency of the state of Tamil Nadu, India established in 1970 to promote small-scale industries in the state. It establishes industrial parks throughout the state, providing the necessary infrastructure for small-scale industries, gives-away government subsidies for the sector, and provides technical assistance for the new industries. Industries refer to the secondary type of occupation. Tamil Nadu is ranked as second largest industrialized state after Maharashtra.

== Inauguration ==
In 1958, an Industrial Estate was established in Guindy, Chennai. It was the first Established Industrial Estate in the Independent India. Later in 1963, Another Industrial Estate was established in Ambattur, near Chennai at a total spawn of 1167 acres and it is one among the largest MSME Industrial Estates in Asia.
