= Esanai =

- village
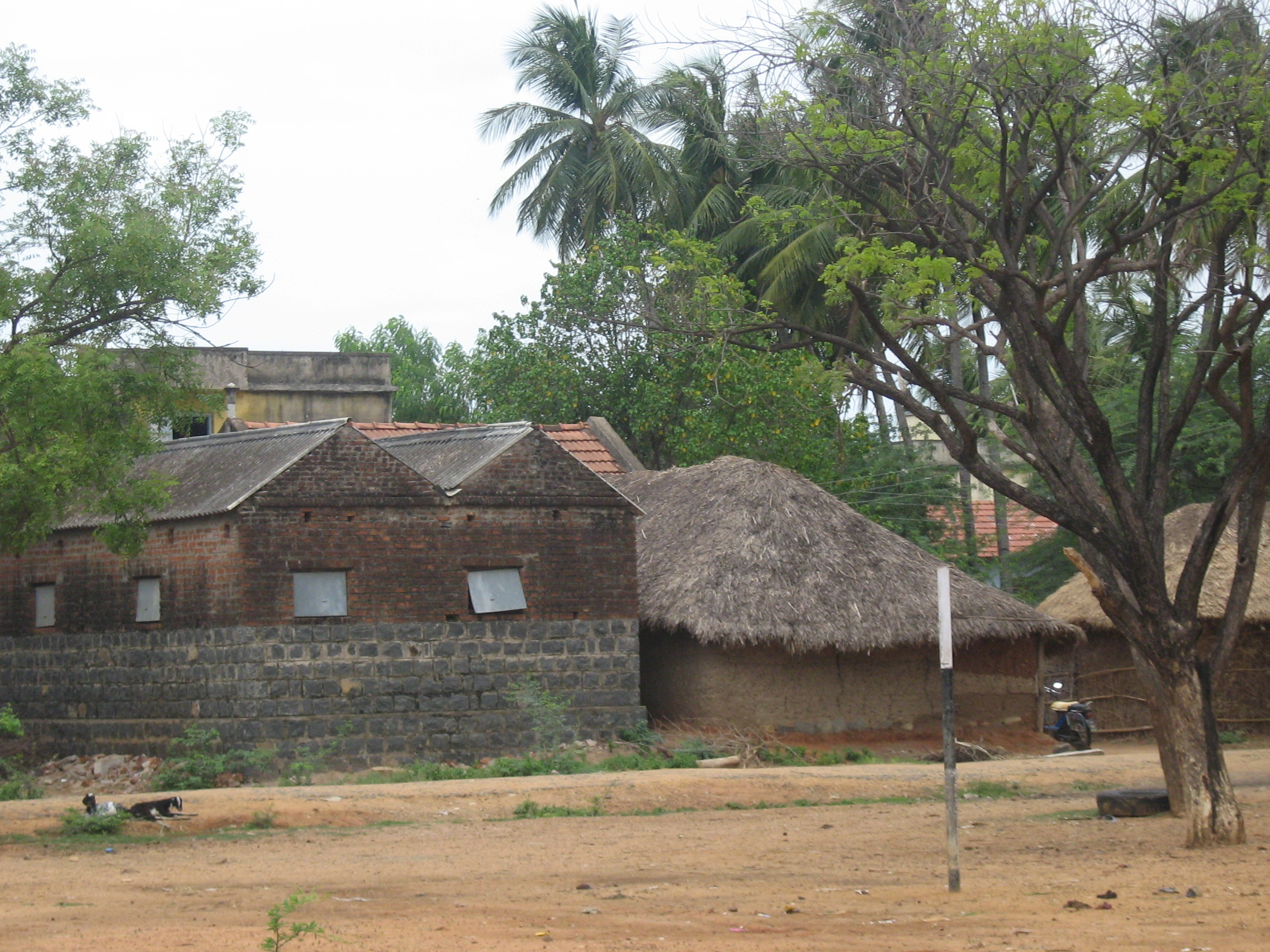
- A portion of the village around the temple

- Location in Tamil Nadu, India
- Coordinates: 11°19′0″N 78°49′59″E
- Country: India
- State: Tamil Nadu
- District: Perambalur

Languages
  - Official: Tamil
- Time zone: UTC+5:30 (IST)

Esanai is a village 50 miles (31 km) northeast of Trichy, in far southern India, coming under the Perambalur taluk in Perambalur district of Tamil Nadu state. It is known mainly for its temple to Ayyappan, which is visited by thousands of people from India and abroad. The main economy of the village has been in farming sugarcane and rice. The village has been among the poorest in the state, and development has been slow to make progress, although modern goods such as cellphones, televisions and motorbikes have become common.

== Transport links ==
The main way to reach this place has been via Trichy (Tiruchirappalli). However, from either Trichy or Lalgudi, buses towards Tirumanur or Thiruvayaru have stopped at Alandur-Mettur. Alternatively, buses have travelled to Pullambadi, from where local buses then went to Aalambadi Mettur, about four kilometers (3 miles) from Esanai.

Trains from Chennai have stopped at Dalmiapuram or Tiruvaiyaru, from where taxis can be taken to Esanai. Trains from Trichy have stopped at Lalgudi, from where taxis or local buses have been available to Esanai.

== Gallery ==
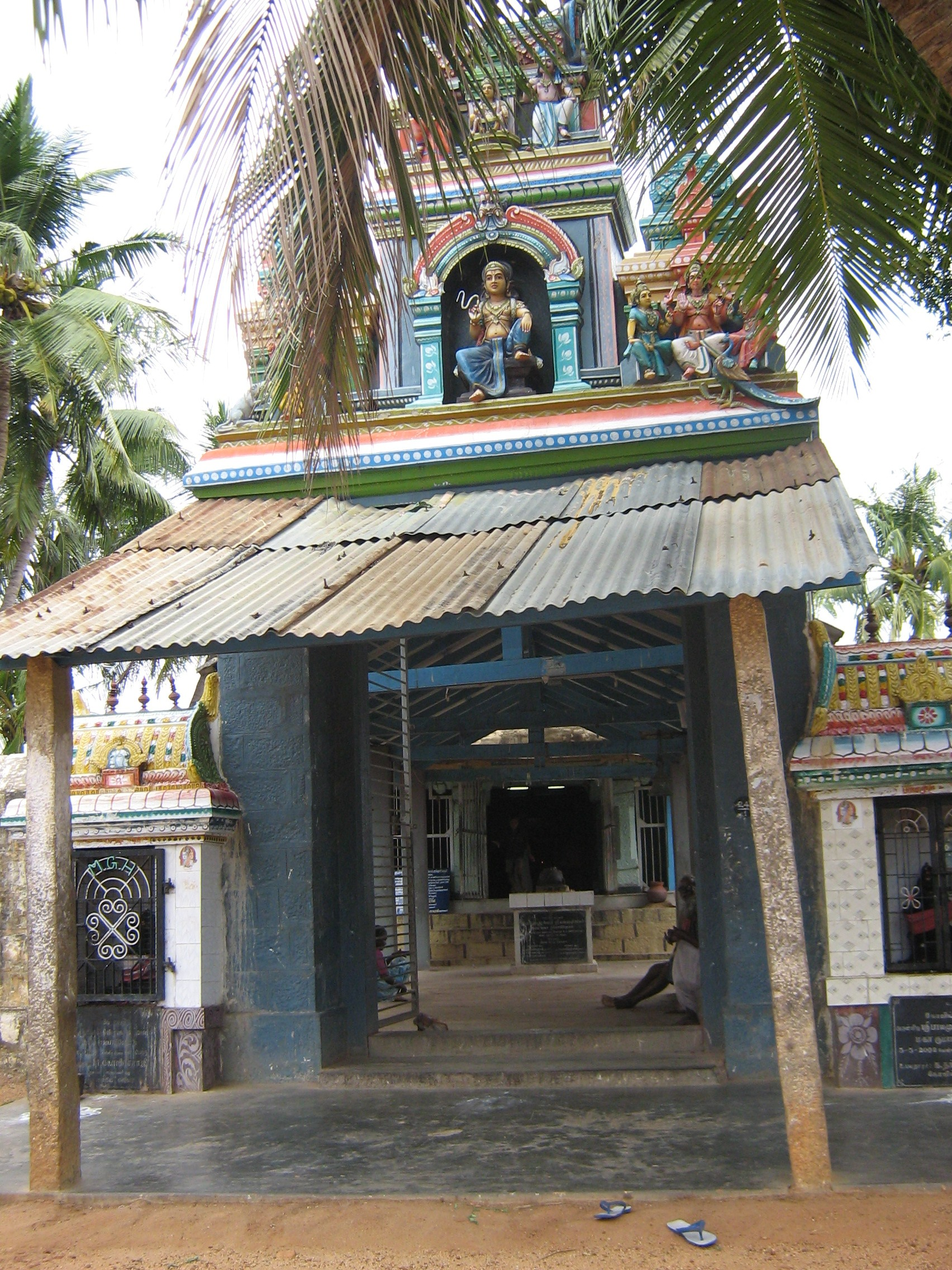

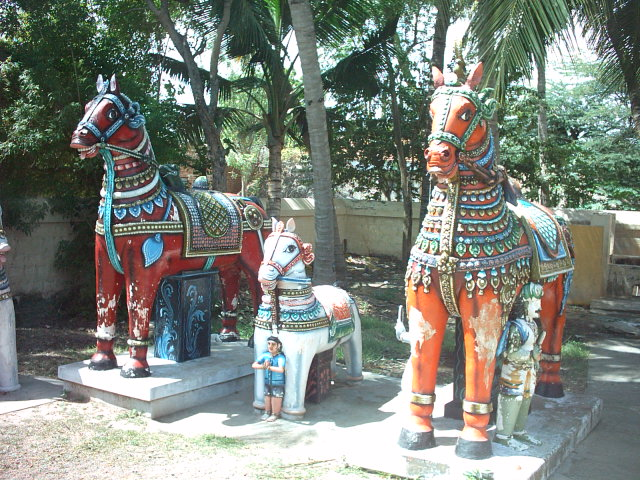
Tamil temple

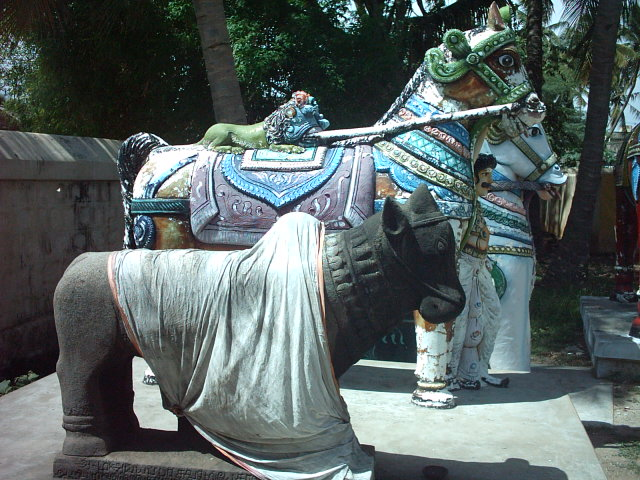
Statues at Esanai

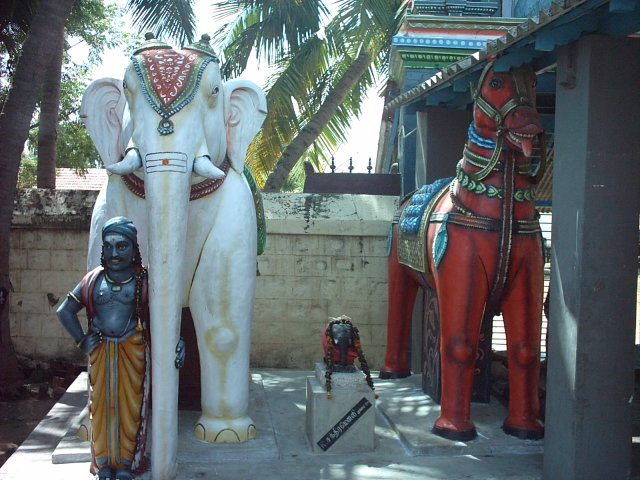

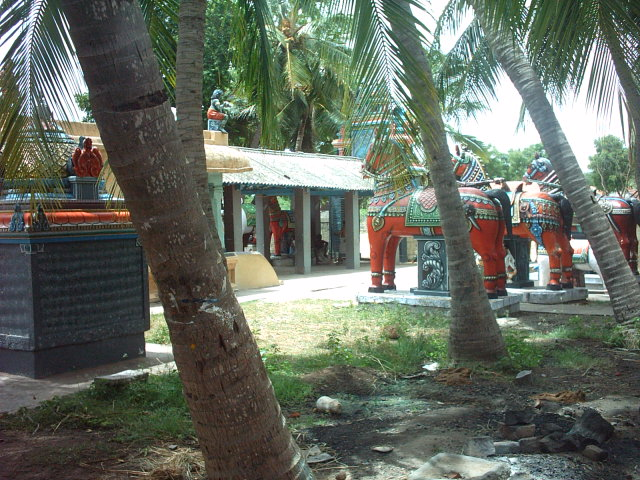
