= Labbaikudikadu =

- Town panchayat
- Location in Tamil Nadu, India
- Coordinates: 11°23′35″N 79°01′53″E
- Country: India
- State: Tamil Nadu
- District: Perambalur
- Elevation: 143 m (469 ft)

Population (2024)
  - Total: 11,891

Languages
  - Official: Tamil
- Time zone: UTC+5:30 (IST)
- Postal code: 621108
- Vehicle registration: TN 46

Labbaikudikadu is a town located in the northeastern part of Perambalur district of the Indian state of Tamil Nadu. It is classified as an urban area. and governed locally by a panchayat

== Demographics ==
As of the 2011 Census of India, Labbaikudikadu has a population of 11,891. In the early 1980s, the majority of the male population emigrated to various Persian Gulf states seeking employment while others concentrated on local business. Many emigrant families are based in Dubai, UAE. Several emigrants held key positions in various government and private sectors. Rising incomes produced savings that were converted into property investments.

== Government ==
The town is divided into a West Section and an East Section, each respectively overseen by a West Jamaat and an East Jamaat. Each of these jamaats is overseen by Jamaatars (Chiefs), chosen by the other members of the Jamaat.

== Religion ==
Muslims form a majority (about 98%) of the population. The community celebrates Eid-al-Adha (Bakrid) and Eid-ul-Fitr (Ramzan). Several large masjid (mosques). A communal get-together called 'Aathu Nombu' is held next day after Eids. It is a festive moment wherein the population gathers to meet on the dry bed of the Vellar river, to enjoy home-made food and small rides and attractions. In addition to these festivals, emigres get together in Dubai at Mushrif park in the name of 'Namadur kudumbam'. A temple gathers Hindu community members.

== Transport ==
Public and private buses connect the village with Perambalur, Ariyalur and Trichy. Minibuses link the village with nearby small villages. Frequent buses to Chennai and other southern districts of Tamil Nadu are available at Thirumandurai Toll Plaza, 4.5 km from the village.
