= Perambalur Buddhas =

Set of historic Buddhist images found in Thiyaganur, Tamil Nadu, India

Thiyaganur Buddha temple
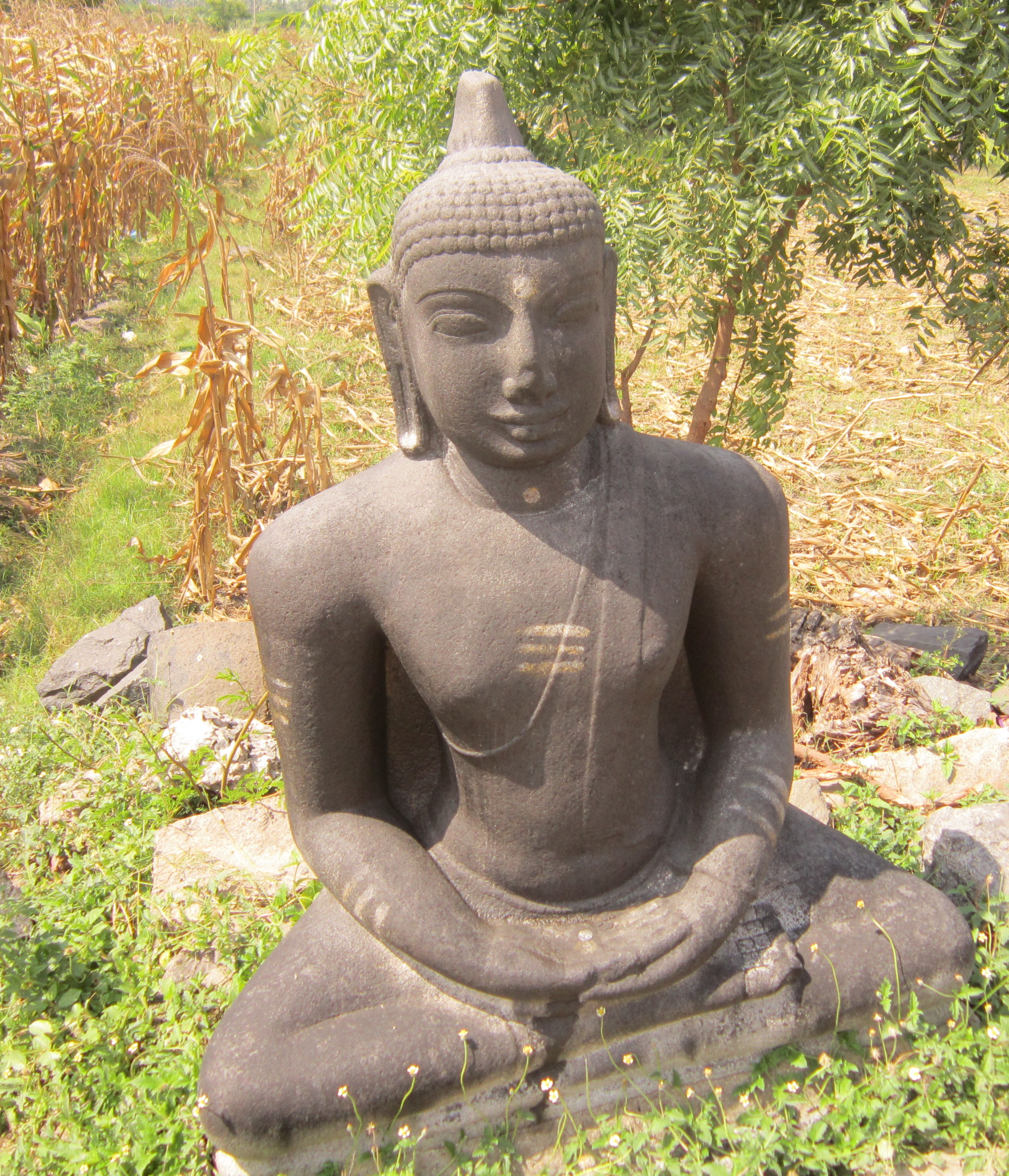
- Image of the Buddha in an open farm

- Location within Tamil Nadu

Religion
- Affiliation: Buddhism

Location
- Location: Salem district, Tamil Nadu
- Country: India
- Coordinates: 11°34′33″N 78°46′42″E

The Perambalur Buddhas (or Thiyaganur Buddha statues or Thiyaganur Buddha temple) are a set of historic Buddhist images found in Thiyaganur, a village in salem district in the South Indian state of Tamil Nadu. There are two 6 ft (1.8 m) images of Buddha in sitting posture, one of which is enshrined in a small temple and various other images scattered in the village. The temple is the only extant Buddhist temple in the state. One of the images in a private farm was later housed in a meditation hall built during 2013 with the help of public contributions. Historians identify the images to the 11th century. With the presence of the images, Thyaganur is counted among Madurai, Kanchipuram, Nagapattinam, Uraiyur, Kaveripattinam and Perambalur among famous Buddhist centres in Tamil Nadu. The villagers administer the temple and practise worship similar to Hindu worship practises. The images are spread across three villages, namely, Paravai, Okalur and Perumathur with a majority found in Paravai.

== History ==
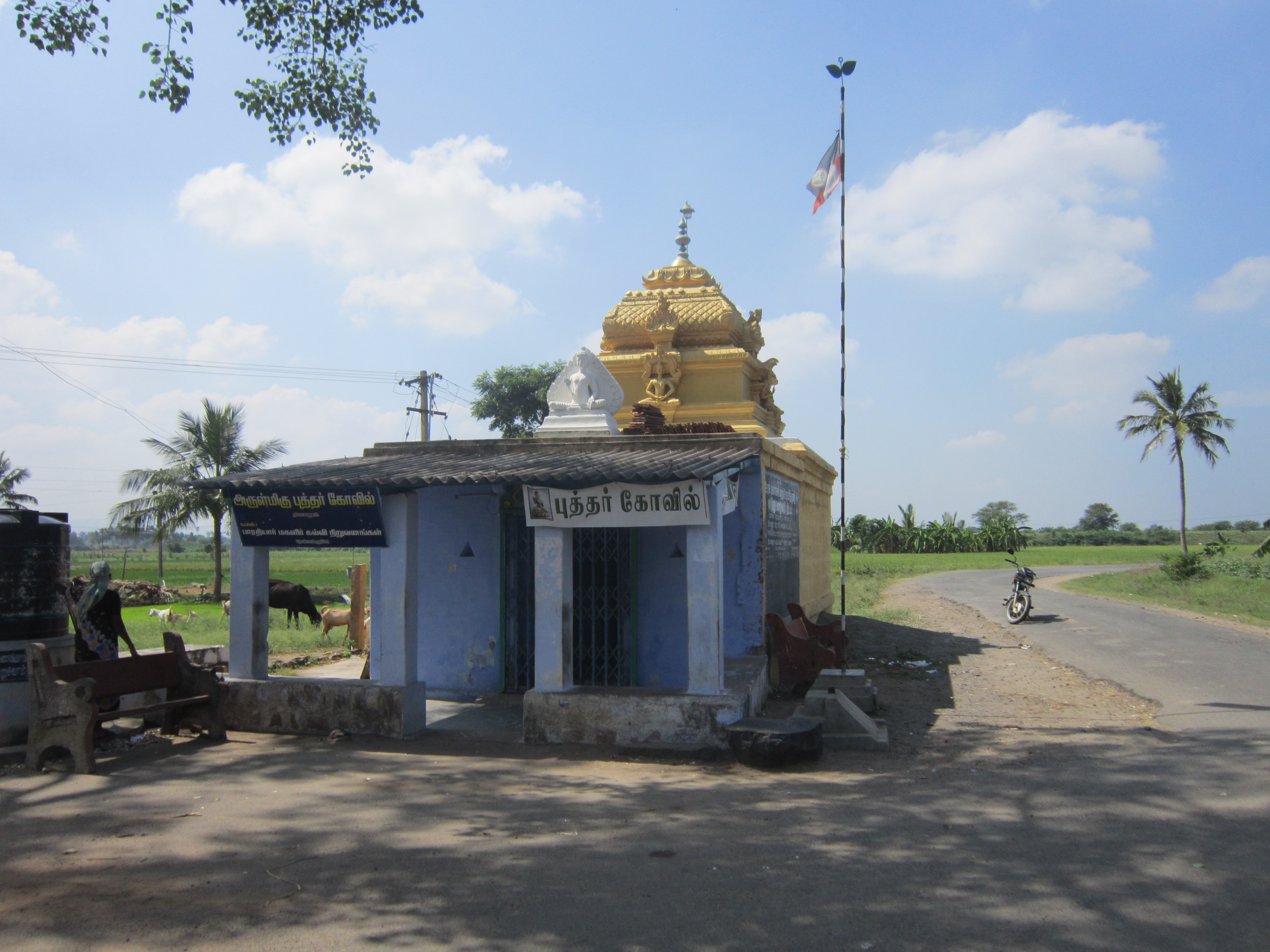
Image of the shrine

Buddhism was popular in the region in modern-day Tamil Nadu around the 3rd century BCE during the rule of Asoka. It flourished under various ruling regimes until the advent of Bhakti movement during the 6th-9th centuries when the royal patronage decreased. During the rule of Chola emperor Raja Raja Chola, there were endowments to Buddhist shrines in Nagapattinam during the 11th century. The bronze Buddhist images found around Nagapattinam region dating back to 13th century and the religious texts by eminent Buddhist during the time indicate the presence of the religion during the period. Historians also attribute that Buddhism was not only restricted to big cities like Kanchipuram and Madurai, but smaller ones like Perambalur where the images are present. The set of images in the village are approximately dated to 11th century. Thyaganur is counted among Madurai, Kanchipuram, Nagapattinam, Uraiyur, Kaveripattinam and Perambalur among famous Buddhist centres in Tamil Nadu. Another view is that Buddhism was prevalent in Chola period as found in the inscriptions and images found in various places in the modern day Trichy, Perambalur, Ariyalur, Karur, Thanjavur, Nagapattinam, Tiruvarur and Pudukottai districts.

== Iconography ==
The Buddhist images are located in villages around Perambalur. There are two major images of Buddha in the village Thiyaganur. One of them is enshrined in a small pillared compound, while the other is located in a private farm. The private farm was converted to a Buddhist Dhyana Mandap (meditation centre) during 2013 enshrining the image at a cost of ₹ 50 lakhs with public contribution. It was modelled similar to the Buddhist shrine in Rajagiri, Bihar. Both the images are 6 ft (1.8 m) tall in a cross legged seated posture and sported with coal black hair. Both the images are sported with a smile. Another image is found in the four way junction of Paravai, a village close to Thiyaganur. There is an image in Veeraganur Dalit Colony. Ogalur houses the image, which has been elevated to a higher structure in modern times by the villagers. The image of Ogalur is locally called "Dubai Buddha" as the locals believe that worshiping the deity helps in overseas travel. There are many other images scattered in the villages, some which are in dilapidated condition. The images are spread across three villages, namely, Paravai, Okalur and Perumathur. As per experts, the image in Perumathur is an image of Jain Tirthankara.

== Culture ==
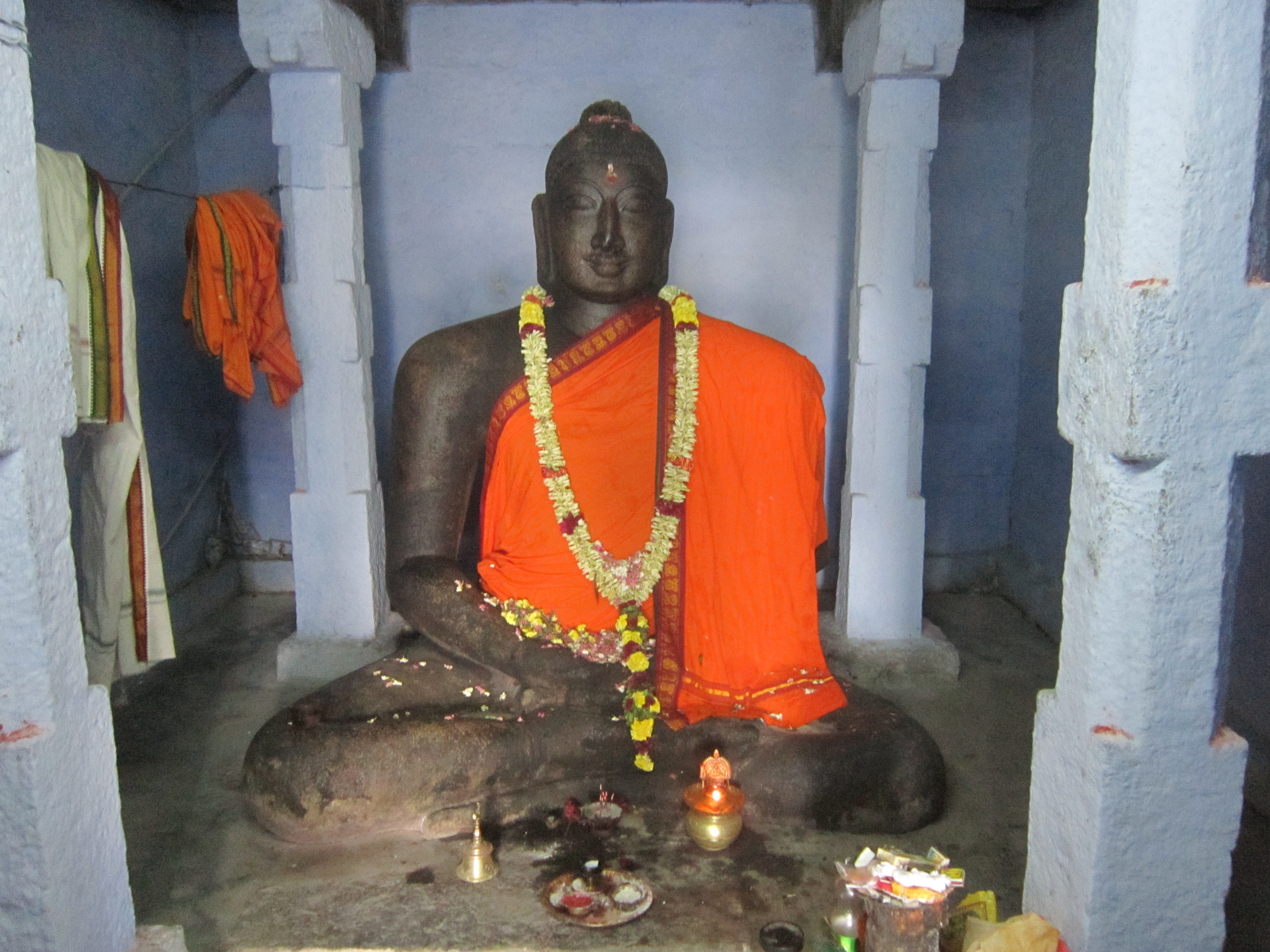
Image of the Buddha in the pillared hall

Most of the village people are not aware of the history of Buddha and treat him as just another god of the region. The common name given to the deity is "Buddha Samy", indicating Buddha the God. Hindu worship practises like decorating the images with decorative clothes and flowers are commonly followed. Lighting lamps and applying sacred ash in the forehead of the images are other common worship offered. People pray by placing stone on the head of the image for curing their bodily ailments. Some of the images are garlanded regularly, while some of the images are offered Pongal, a rice mixture offered to the deities as the last step of the rituals. The meditation centre built in 2013 can accommodate hundred people at a time and was targeted to be a tourist centre in the region.
