= Venganur =

- village
- Country: India
- State: Tamil Nadu
- District: Cuddalore

Population (2001)
  - Total: 2,327

Languages
  - Official: Tamil
- Time zone: UTC+5:30 (IST)
- Vehicle registration: TN-
- Coastline: 0 kilometres (0 mi)
- Sex ratio: 1038 ♂/♀
- Literacy: 65.96%

Venganur is a village in the Tittagudi taluk of Cuddalore district, Tamil Nadu, India. Venganur is famous for ancient, highly artistic Sri Virudhachaleshwarar Temple.

Venganur now belongs to Veppanthattai block in Perambalur district.

== Demographics ==
As per the 2001 census, Venganur had a total population of 2327 with 1142 males and 1185 females.
