= Kurumbalur =

- Panchayath town
- Location in Tamil Nadu, India Kurumbalur (India)
- Coordinates: 11°13′55″N 78°47′28″E
- Country: India
- State: Tamil Nadu
- District: Perambalur

Population (2018)
  - Total: 21,702

Languages
  - Official: Tamil
- Time zone: UTC+5:30 (IST)
- Postal code: 621107

Kurumbalur is a panchayat town in Perambalur district in the Indian state of Tamil Nadu.

== Demographics ==
As of 2018 India census, Kurumbalur had a total population of 21,702. Males make up 50% (10,867) of the population and females 50% (10, 835). Kurumbalur has an average literacy rate of 64%, higher than the national average of 59.5%: male literacy is 72%, and female literacy is 56%. In Kurumbalur, 10% of the population is under 6 years of age.

Kurumbalur is town panchayat includes Palayam, Kurumbalur, Moolakaadu, Mettangaadu, K.Puthur and Eachampatti villages.
