= Palayam, Perambalur =

Palayam
- village
- Country: India
- State: Tamil Nadu
- District: Perambalur
- Taluk: Perambalur

Languages
  - Official: Tamil
- Time zone: UTC+5:30 (IST)
- Postal code: 621107

Palayam is a village in the Perambalur district, Tamil Nadu, India. It comes under the jurisdiction of Perambalur police station.
