= Elumur =

Elumur Ezhumoor
- village
- Location in Elumur, Tamil Nadu, India Elumur (India)
- Coordinates: 11°17′27.58″N 78°59′34.25″E
- Country: India
- State: Tamil Nadu
- District: Perambalur

Government
  - Type: Panchayati raj (India)
  - Body: Gram panchayat

Languages
  - Official: Tamil
- Time zone: UTC+5:30 (IST)
- PIN: 621 115
- Telephone code: 04328

Elumur is a village located in the Perambalur district of Tamil Nadu, India. The village is a home to the Perambalur District
