= Sengunam =

Sengunam Sengundram
- village
- Nickname: SSK
- Location in Sengunam, Tamil Nadu, India Sengunam (India)
- Coordinates: 11°16′12.10″N 78°54′55.39″E
- Country: India
- State: Tamil Nadu
- District: Perambalur

Government
  - Type: Panchayati raj (India)
  - Body: Gram panchayat

Languages
  - Official: Tamil
- Time zone: UTC+5:30 (IST)
- PIN: 621220
- Telephone code: 04328

Sengunam is a village located in the Perambalur district of Tamil Nadu, India. The village is a home to the Perambalur District.
