= Ogalur =

Coordinates: 11°24′N 79°04′E

Ogalur is a village in Perambalur district, Tamil Nadu, India. It was formerly in Tiruchirappalli district.

The village was the site of violence between police and Dalits in 1998.
