= Thambiranpatty =

Village in Tamil Nadu, India

Thambiranpatty Thambirampatti
- village
- Country: India
- State: Tamil Nadu
- District: Perambalur

Languages
  - Official: Tamil
- Time zone: UTC+5:30 (IST)
- PIN: 621104
- Vehicle registration: TN-46
- Nearest city: Perambalur, Chettikulam

Thambiranpatty is a village in Velur panchyat of Perambalur district, Tamil Nadu, India.
