= Brahmadesam (Veppanthai) =

Coordinates: 11.2334284°N 78.8806089°E

Brahmadesam is an Indian Panchayat village located in Veppanthattai taluk of Perambalur district in the state of Tamil Nadu. According to the 2001 census, the village had a population of 2390, with a literacy rate of 66.32%.
