= Thungapuram =

- Panchayat village

- Location in Tamil Nadu, India Thungapuram (India)
- Coordinates: 11.19°N 79.10°E
- Country: India
- State: Tamil Nadu
- District: Perambalur

Languages
  - Official: Tamil
- Time zone: UTC+5:30 (IST)
- PIN: 621 716.
- Telephone code: 04328
- Vehicle registration: TN46, TN45
- Nearest city: Perambalur, Ariyalur, Thittakudi, Trichy.
- Literacy: 72%
- Climate: cool- hat-cool (Köppen)
- Website: wikimapia.org/10804850/THUNGAPURAM

Thungapuram (Tunkapuram or Kulōttuŋkacōļapuram or Ciṛu Maturai) is a panchayat village of Perambalur district, Tamil Nadu, India. It was formerly in Tiruchirappalli district

== Politics ==
Before in 1995 Thungapuram have under Perambalur taluk and Tiruchirappalli district. After Composite Perambalur District came into existence after trifurcation of Tiruchirappalli district with effect from 30.09.1995 as per G.O MS.No 913 Revenue / Y3 dated 30.09.1995. Now its comes to under kunnam taluk in Perambalur district.

Thungapuram assembly constituency is part of Chidambaram (Lok Sabha constituency).

== Media and communication ==
Leading Tamil, English languages newspapers are available in Thungapuram. English dailies such as, The New Indian Express, The Hindu are available.
