= Kalpadi =

Village in India

Kalpadi is a panchayat village of Perambalur district, Tamil Nadu, India.

== History ==
The historical name of Kalpady is very famous for its festivals. Every four years, three festivals have been conducted by this village. In the period of kulothunga chola made two important temples, the first one lord siva "sokkanathar" temple. Another one lard vinava perumal temple. These two temples are very old around 1000 years ago.

Hamlet villages of Kalpady are Kalpady, K.Eraiyur, Neduvasal & Eraiyasamudram. This village panchayat contains nine wards – wards in Kalpady, two in Eraiyur, two in Neduvasal and two in Eraiyasamudram. Kalpady panchayat is one of the earning property of Perambalur district from Blackstone mines. This village contains Hindus(98%) and Muslims(2%).

== Geography ==
The geographic coordinates are 11.19°N 78.92°E This is a village. There are streams around this village like Maruthaiyaaru (மருதையாறு). The geographical location of Kalpady is given below.

== Agriculture and major crops ==
Rice and Sugar cane are grown as a major commercial crop. The pre-dominate soil in the district is red sanding with scattered packers of black soil. This village consists mainly of glade soil. The soil in the district is best suited for raising dry crops. Cotton is also grown in many places.

The crops grown in Kalpadi include

- Paddy
- Sugar cane
- Banana
- Coconut
- Cotton
- Turmeric
- Corn
- Groundnut
- Sago
- Millet.

== Education ==
In Kalpady panchayat have four schools:

- Government High School, Kalpady .
- Panchayat Union Primary School, Eraiyasamudram.
- Panchayat Union Primary School, Neduvasal.
- Panchayat Union Middle School, Eraiyur.

There are many educated people living in Kalpady, i.e., Teachers, Professor, Scientist, Doctors, Engineers, Lawyers, and so on.
