= Sirumathur Kudikadu =

Sirumathur Kudikadu S. Kudikadu
- village
- Location in Sirumathur Kudikadu, Tamil Nadu, India Sirumathur Kudikadu (India)
- Coordinates: 11°18′26.22″N 78°58′38.94″E
- Country: India
- State: Tamil Nadu
- District: Perambalur

Government
  - Type: Panchayati raj (India)
  - Body: Gram panchayat

Languages
  - Official: Tamil
- Time zone: UTC+5:30 (IST)
- PIN: 621 115
- Telephone code: 04328
- Sirumathur Kudikadu Village

Sirumathur Kudikadu is a village located in the Perambalur district of Tamil Nadu, India. The village is a home to the Perambalur District
