= Keelapuliyur =

Keelapuliyur Village
- village
- Keelapuliyur
- Nickname: Puliyur
- Location in Keelapuliyur, Tamil Nadu, India
- Coordinates: 11°17′53.62″N 78°57′48.67″E
- Country: India
- State: Tamil Nadu
- District: Perambalur

Government
  - Type: Panchayati raj (India)
  - Body: Gram panchayat

Languages
  - Official: Tamil
- Time zone: UTC+5:30 (IST)
- PIN: 621 115
- Telephone code: 04328

Keelapuliyur is a settlement in Tamil Nadu, India.
