= T.Kalathur =

- Panchayat village
- Tamil Nadu, Republic of India T.Kalathur (India)
- Coordinates: 11.13°N 78.69°E
- Country: India
- State: Tamil Nadu
- District: Perambalur district

Population (2011)
  - Total: 4,436

Languages
  - Official: Tamil
- Time zone: UTC+5:30 (IST)
- Postal code: 621114
- Area code: 04328

T.Kalathur is a village in the Perambalur district in the state of Tamil Nadu India.

== Location ==
T.Kalathur is a medium-sized village with a population of 4436 in 2011,. The village is situated on a plain at the edge of the Pachamalai Hills (part of the Eastern Ghats). The nearest major city is Trichy (Tiruchirapalli, 45 km), which also has the nearest train station and airport. The village is about 278.5 km from state capital Chennai.

== Occupation ==
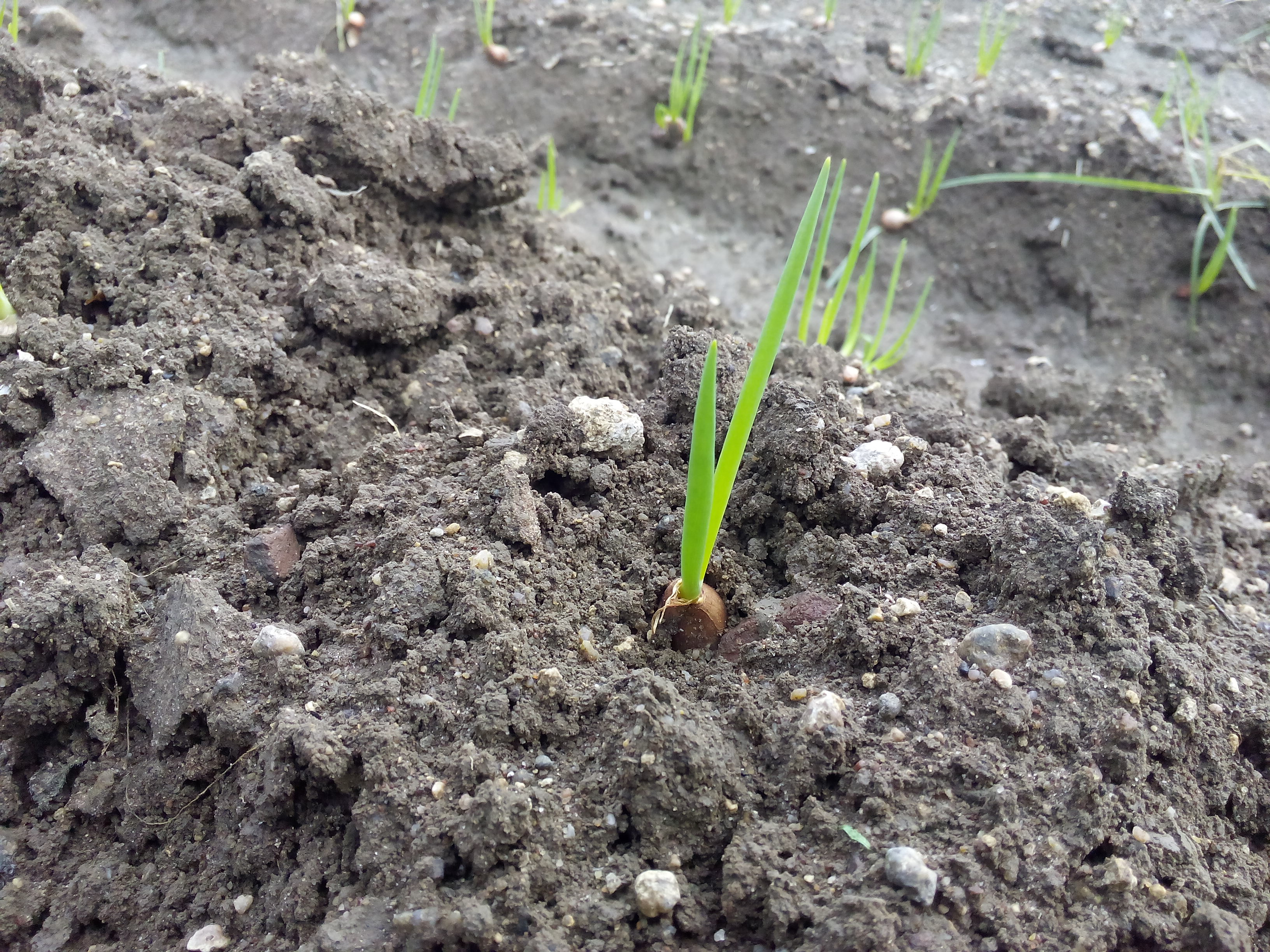

The main occupation in this area is agriculture, which primarily depends on seasonal rainfall and water drawn from wells. Small onions (Allium cepa var. aggregatum) are the village's most important cash crop. Other crops include cotton, millet, corn, groundnut, sesame, and chilis.

== People ==
This village has people across religions (Hindus and Muslims). This village panchayat president seat was reserved for SC until 1996.

== Education ==
The village has a government high school and two government primary education schools. There are also schools and colleges in Thuraiyur, Perambalur, and surrounding villages.

== Transport ==
There are several government and private buses connecting the village with Thuraiyur, Perambalur Town, and Trichy. Frequent buses are also available to Chennai from T.Kalathur Main Road which is situated 2.3 km from the village.

== Temples ==
The village has a large dargah, popular with local Muslims and people of other faiths. It also has small and medium-size temples devoted to Shiva, Vishnu, Vinayagar, Mariamman, Ellaiamman, and the village's guardian deity (sangili karupu swamy, sikkana karupu swamy) at the eastern entrance of the village.

== Festivals ==
Like other villages in Tamil Nadu, sandhana koodu (uroos) in saiyath musthafa avuliya thargga, Thai Pongal is an important celebration. "Rabit Hunting" is a famous festival on the first Sunday of the Tamil month of Chithirai (mid-April to mid-May) every year throughout the Perambalur district.

== Statistics ==
No of Households	1284
Total Population Male	2203
Total Population Female	2233
Literates Population Male	1777
Literates Population Female	1593

== Notes ==
11.13°N 78.69°E
