= Sirugudal =

- village
- Location in Sirugudal, Tamil Nadu, India Sirugudal (India)
- Coordinates: 11°17′14.04″N 78°56′5.51″E
- Country: India
- State: Tamil Nadu
- District: Perambalur

Government
  - Type: Panchayati raj (India)
  - Body: Gram panchayat

Languages
  - Official: Tamil
- Time zone: UTC+5:30 (IST)
- PIN: 621 115
- Telephone code: 04328

Sirugudal is a village located in the Perambalur district of Tamil Nadu, India.
