= Kunnam taluk =

Kunnam taluk is a taluk of Perambalur district of the Indian state of Tamil Nadu. The headquarters of the taluk is the town of Kunnam. It is a town and a special grade municipality in the Perambalur district. It is located 18 km from Perambalur. Kunnam is known for its temples and mathas. There are around 12 Hindu temples within the municipal limits of area. Apart from these, there several thousand temples around the town thereby giving the town the sobriquets temple town and City of temples. The most important temples present in Kunnam are the amman temple, the kaleswaran temple and the Ramaswamy temple.

== Demographics ==
According to the 2011 census, the taluk of Kunnam had a population of 253,818 with 126,525 males and 127,293 females. There were 1006 women for every 1000 men. The taluk had a literacy rate of 64.2. Child population in the age group below 6 was 13,635 Males and 12,385 Females.
