= Chettikulam =

Chettikulam pannaiyur Pannaiyur
- Village
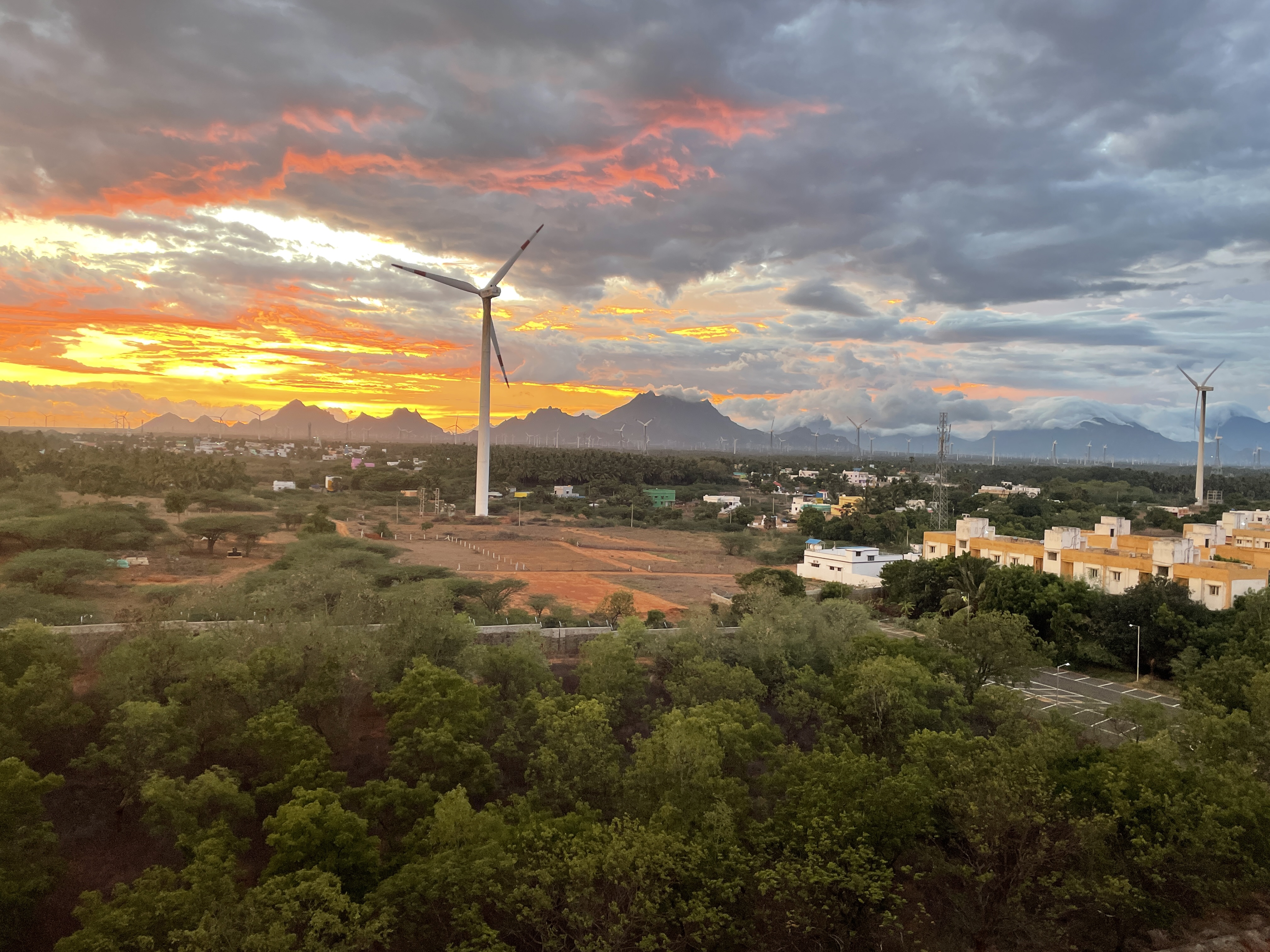
- WNW view from Chettikulama at sunset

- Location in Tamil Nadu, India
- Coordinates: 8°9′38″N 77°36′57″E
- Country: India
- State: Tamil Nadu
- District: Tirunelveli

Area
  - Total: 8.36 km^{2} (3.23 sq mi)
- Elevation: 70 m (230 ft)

Population (2011 census)
  - Total: 13,866
  - Density: 1,660/km^{2} (4,300/sq mi)

Tamilan
  - Official: Tamil
- Time zone: UTC+5:30 (IST)
- PIN: 627120
- Telephone code: 04637-257198
- Vehicle registration: TN-72
- Nearest city: Kanyakumari
- Lok Sabha constituency: Tirunelveli

Chettikulam pannaiyur is a small coastal village in Tirunelveli district, Tamil Nadu, India.

It is 12 kilometres (7.5 mi) from Kanyakumari on the east coastal road connecting Kanyakumari with Thiruchendur. The nearest town is Nagercoil. The Kudankulam Nuclear Power Project has built a large township known as Anuvijay Township for its employees in the village.

The village has a telephone exchange, bank (SBI Pandian Grama Bank), post office and four schools. Including the township, the population is nearly 28,000. Chettikulam has beach and pond. There is a family park in the beach, which used to be covered with coconut trees. The sea shore is the longest in Tirunelveli district. It is almost 3 kilometres (1.9 mi) long. During festival times peoples from chettikulam as well as tourists gather here. The village is surrounded by agricultural lands.

== Culture ==
People of Chettikulam basically worship and follow "kula theiva vazhibadu." All families have their own kula theivam (family temple). Families often prepare and share meat offerings with their god. People also follow Hinduism, Christianity, and Islam.

== Education ==
The village has a government higher secondary school in the bypass road with more than 2,000 students. The nearest colleges are at Kanyakumari, Palkulam (Anjugramam), Levengipuram, Nagercoil, Koothankuli, and Vadakkankulam.

== Hospital ==
The village has one Government Hospital near the bypass. It also has a private clinic opposite to chettikulam panchayat office.
