= Perambalur =

Perambalur Perumpuliur
- Selection Grade Municipality
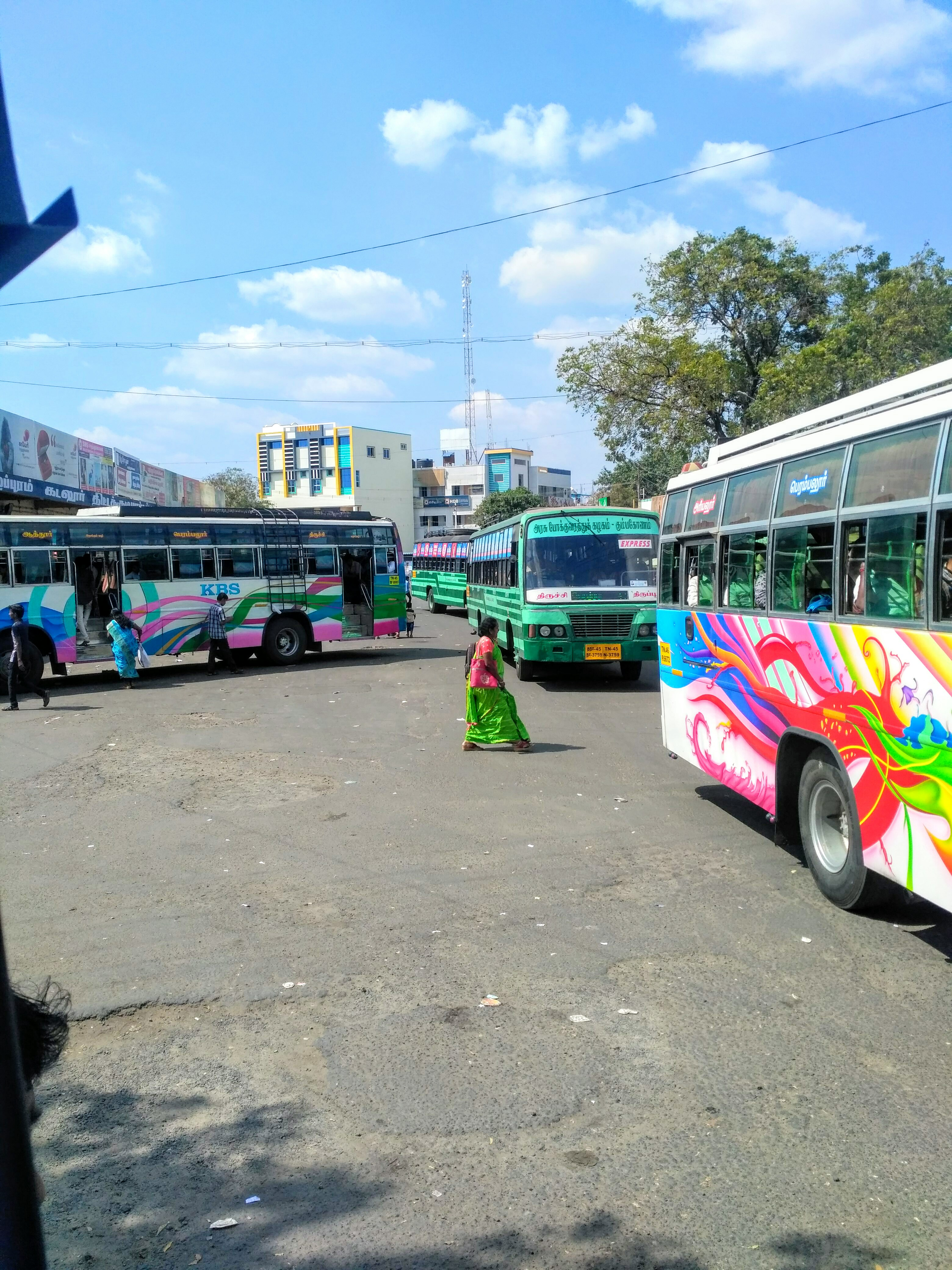
- Perambalur bus station

- Location in Tamil Nadu, India
- Coordinates: 11.23°N 78.88°E
- Country: India
- State: Tamil Nadu
- District: Perambalur

Government
  - Type: Selection Grade Municipality
  - Body: Perambalur Municipality
- Elevation: 143 m (469 ft)

Population (2011)
  - Total: 49,648
  - Rank: 1

Languages
  - Official: Tamil
- Time zone: UTC+5:30 (IST)
- Postal code: 621212
- Area code: 04328
- Vehicle registration: TN-46
- Website: https://perambalur.nic.in

Perambalur is a Selection Grade Municipality is located in the heart of Tamil Nadu and is 267 kilometers South of the capital city of Chennai. The district covers an area of 1,757 square kilometers, located between 10.54' and 11.30' degrees of Northern latitude and 78.40' and 79.30' degrees of Eastern longitude. There are no coastal lines in this inland district.

The Vellar River forms the northern boundary of the district, and the district is divided into distinct natural regions.

The most important irrigation resource is groundwater, accessed through tube wells and wells. Paddy, groundnut, sugarcane, millet, and cashew are the major crops grown in the district. Perambalur accounts for about 24% of the small onion produced in Tamil Nadu and holds first place in state production.

As per the 2011 Census, the total population of the Perambalur District is 5,65,223. The density of the population in the district is 321 per sq. Km

There is a set of 11th-century Buddha statues around the villages of Perambalur called Perambalur Buddhas.

== Etymology ==
Historically, Perumpuliyur was commonly referred to in English as Perambalur. According to popular belief, the name Perumpuliyur signifies that the region might once have been a shelter for different varieties of tigers. "Perum" refers to "vast" and "puli" refers to "tiger" in English. Meanwhile, the villages around the town also own similar names such as keelapuliyur, melapuliyur, kurumbalur (aka kurumpuliyur), etc. declares additional importance to the stance.

According to Hindu mythology, the name referred to a once lived siddhar in the locality named pulisiddhar.

== Geography ==
It is the largest city and administrative headquarters of Perambalur district and Perambalur Taluk (Sub-District).^{[1]}

The city covers an area of 74 km^{2}.^{[1]} Though a landlocked district, fossils of marine species dated 416 million years ago were found near the Kunnam taluk of the district, revealing that the land was part of the ancient sea.

Religious census
Religion	Percent(%)
Hindu	86.94%
Muslim	9.29%
Christian	3.6%
Sikh	0.01%
Buddhist	0.01%
Jain	0.0%
Other	0.12%
No religion	0.03%

According to the 2011 census, Perambalur had a population of 49,648 with a sex ratio of 1,013 females for every 1,000 males, much above the national average of 929. A total of 5,190 were under the age of six, constituting 2,678 males and 2,512 females. Scheduled Castes and Scheduled Tribes accounted for 29.43% and 0.29% of the population respectively. The average literacy of the town was 80.77%, compared to the national average of 72.99%. The town had a total of 12,732 households. There was a total of 18,430 workers, comprising 998 cultivators, 1,746 main agricultural laborers, 364 in household industries, 13,762 other workers, 1,560 marginal workers, 49 marginal cultivators, 390 marginal agricultural laborers, 78 marginal workers in household industries and 1,043 other marginal workers. As per the religious census of 2011, Perambalur had 86.94% Hindus, 9.29% Muslims, 3.6% Christians, 0.01% Sikhs, 0.01% Buddhists, 0.0% Jains, 0.12% following other religions, and 0.03% following no religion or did not indicate any religious preference.

== Administration and Politics ==
Perambalur District comprises one Revenue Division viz., Perambalur, Four Taluks viz., Perambalur, Veppanthattai, Kunnam, Alathur comprising 152 Revenue Villages. The District has four blocks, viz. Perambalur, Veppanthattai, Veppur, Alathur comprise 121 Village Panchayats. There is one Municipality viz. Perambalur and four Town Panchayats viz. Arumbavur, Kurumbalur, Labbaikudikadu and Poolambadi.

Perambalur comes under the Perambalur parliamentary constituency which elects two members to the Tamil Nadu Legislative Assembly once every five years. After 2008, the district was represented by two elected members, one each for the Perambalur and Kunnam constituencies. It is a part of the Chidambaram constituency, which elects its Member of Parliament (MP) once every five years. Perambalur (state assembly constituency) is reserved for scheduled castes. And current MLA is Prabhakaran from DMK, elected in the 2021 Tamil Nadu Legislative Assembly election. The current Member of Parliament for Perambalur Constituency is Arun Nehru.

Law and order are enforced by the Tamil Nadu police, which, for administrative purposes, has constituted Perambalur city as a separate district with a total of 9 police stations

== Education ==
- Thanthai Hans Roever College

== Transport ==
=== Road ===
The National Highway NH38 Passes through the District connecting various prominent cities like Tiruchirapalli, Karaikal, Vellore, Villupuram, Madurai, Salem, Erode, Karur, Thanjavur, Nagapattinam, Pudukottai. TNSTC runs regular buses from Perambalur Bus stand to all the above cities and much more. TNSETC Buses connect Perambalur with Chennai, Hosur, and Bengaluru. PRTC runs regular buses from Pondicherry and Karaikal towards Perambalur.

=== Rail ===
The Only Railway Station in the District is Sillakkudi Railway Station. Other nearest Railway Junctions are Ariyalur Railway Station (40 km.) Tiruchirapalli Railway Junction (59 km.) and Vriddhachalam Railway Junction (69 km.)

=== Air ===
Perambalur district doesn't have its own Airport. The nearest International Airport is Tiruchirapalli International Airport (61 km.)

=== Sea ===
The district doesn't have any coast lines, So the nearest seaport is Karaikal port, 139 km away from Perambalur which is located in the Union Territory of Puducherry.

== Landmarks ==
There is a set of 11th-century Buddha statues around the villages of Perambalur called Perambalur Buddhas.

A 15th-century fortress named Ranjankudi Fort located about 16 km north of the town in NH 45. The fort has a palace, residence buildings, underground chamber and an underground passage that links Pettai with Kottai Medu.

Mayil ootru is a waterfall on the foothills of Pachaimalai. Located near the village Ladapuram, it is 23 km from Perambalur surrounded by dense forest.

== See also ==
- List of educational institutions in Perambalur
