= Outline of Tamil Nadu =

Overview of and topical guide to Tamil Nadu

Location of Tamil Nadu

The following outline is provided as an overview of and topical guide to Tamil Nadu:

Tamil Nadu – state in South India. Tamil Nadu covers an area of 130,058 km2 (50,216 sq mi), and is the eleventh largest state in India. The bordering states are Kerala to the west, Karnataka to the north west and Andhra Pradesh to the north. To the east is the Bay of Bengal and the state encircles the union territory of Puducherry. The southernmost tip of the Indian Peninsula is Kanyakumari which is the meeting point of the Arabian Sea, the Bay of Bengal, and the Indian Ocean. When India became independent in 1947, Madras presidency became Madras state, comprising present-day Tamil Nadu, coastal Andhra Pradesh up to Ganjam district in Orissa, South Canara district Karnataka, and parts of Kerala. The state was subsequently split up along linguistic lines. In 1969, Madras State was renamed Tamil Nadu, meaning "Tamil country".

Seal of Tamil Nadu

== General reference ==
=== Names ===
- Common name: Tamil Nadu
- Native name = தமிழ்நாடு
- Pronunciation: /tæmɪl nɑːduː/ TAM-il-NAH-doo; Tamil: தமிழ்நாடு, Tamiḻnātu;
- Originally known as : Madras State Established in 1773; Madras State was formed in 1950 and renamed as Tamil Nadu on 14 January 1969
- Official name: Tamil Nadu
- Nicknames
- Adjectivals
  - Tamil
- Demonyms
  - Tamils
- Abbreviations and name codes
  - ISO 3166-2 code: IN-TN
  - Vehicle registration code: TN

=== Rankings (amongst India's states) ===
- by population: 6th
- by area (2011 census): 11th
- by crime rate (2015): 7th
- by gross domestic product (GDP) (2014): 2nd
- by Human Development Index (HDI):
- by life expectancy at birth:
- by literacy rate:

== Geography of Tamil Nadu ==
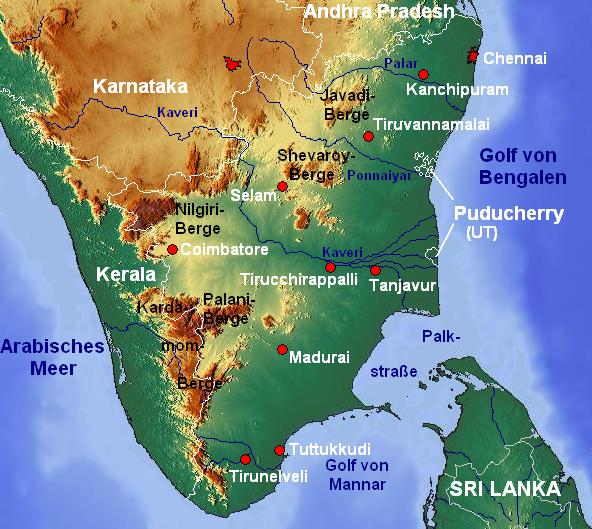
Topographical map of Tamil Nadu

Geography of Tamil Nadu

- Tamil Nadu is: an Indian state
- Population of Tamil Nadu:
- Area of Tamil Nadu:
- Atlas of Tamil Nadu

=== Location of Tamil Nadu ===
- Tamil Nadu is situated within the following regions:
  - Northern Hemisphere
  - Eastern Hemisphere
    - Eurasia
      - Asia
        - South Asia
          - India
            - South India
- Time zone: Indian Standard Time (UTC+05:30)

=== Environment of Tamil Nadu ===
- Climate of Tamil Nadu
- Protected areas of Tamil Nadu (see below)
- Wildlife of Tamil Nadu
  - Flora of Tamil Nadu
  - Fauna of Tamil Nadu
    - Birds of Tamil Nadu

==== Natural geographic features of Tamil Nadu ====
- Lakes of Tamil Nadu
- Mountains of Tamil Nadu
  - Western Ghats
  - Eastern Ghats
  - Nilgiri mountains
- Rivers of Tamil Nadu

=== Protected areas of Tamil Nadu ===
==== Biosphere reserves ====
Two of the three biosphere reserves in Tamil Nadu are among four in India and ninety five in Asia that are part of UNESCO's Programme on Man and the Biosphere (MAB).

The 3 Biosphere Reserves in Tamil Nadu listed by size are:

1. The Gulf of Mannar Biosphere Reserve
2. Nilgiri Biosphere Reserve
3. Agasthyamalai Biosphere Reserve

==== National parks ====
National parks
of Tamil Nadu

Tamil Nadu has 5 declared National Parks with a total area over 307.84 km^{2} (118.86 sq mi), covering only 0.24% of the state. This is the third lowest % area covered of all Indian states and Union territories.

1. Indira Gandhi National Park
2. Mudumalai National Park
3. Mukurthi National Park
4. Gulf of Mannar Marine National Park
5. Guindy National Park
6. Palani Hills National Park

==== Wildlife sanctuaries ====
Wildlife sanctuaries in India – there are 7 wildlife sanctuaries plus 13 bird sanctuaries that together cover over 2,997.60 km^{2} (1,157.38 sq mi), 2.30% of the total state area.

1. Grizzled Squirrel Wildlife Sanctuary
2. Indira Gandhi Wildlife Sanctuary
3. Kalakkad Wildlife Sanctuary
4. Mundanthurai Sanctuary
5. Kanyakumari Wildlife Sanctuary
6. Mudumalai Wildlife Sanctuary
7. Vallanadu Wildlife Sanctuary
8. Sathyamangalam Wildlife Sanctuary

Map Key:	Biosphere Reserve	National Park	Wildlife Sanctuary	Bird Sanctuary	Zoo

Protected areas of Tamil Nadu

==== Elephant reserves ====
Tamil Nadu is a major participant in Project Elephant.

1. Nilgiri Elephant Reserve
2. Coimbatore Elephant Reserve
3. Anamalai Elephant Reserve
4. Srivilliputtur Elephant Reserve
5. Rejuvenation Camp for Temple and Private Elephants of Tamil Nadu

==== Tiger reserves ====
Tamil Nadu has 4 tiger reserves which are declared as part of Project Tiger:

1. Kalakkad Mundanthurai Tiger Reserve
2. Mudumalai National Park
3. Annamalai-Parambikulam Tiger Reserve
4. Sathyamangalam Wildlife Sanctuary

The state has 2 other significant tiger habitats:

1. Kanyakumari Wildlife Sanctuary
2. Mukurthi National Park

==== Bird sanctuaries ====
There are 13 established bird sanctuaries at the southernmost continental range of the Central Asian Flyway in Tamil Nandu.

1. Chitrangudi Bird Sanctuary
2. Kanjirankulam Bird Sanctuary
3. Karaivetti Bird Sanctuary
4. Karikili Bird Sanctuary
5. Koothankulam Bird Sanctuary
6. Melaselvanur - Kilaselvanur Bird Sanctuary
7. Point Calimere Wildlife and Bird Sanctuary
8. Pulicat Lake Bird Sanctuary
9. Vaduvoor Bird Sanctuary
10. Vedanthangal Bird Sanctuary
11. Vellode Birds Sanctuary
12. Vettangudi Bird Sanctuary
13. Viralimalai Peacock Sanctuary
14. Kallaperambur lake
15. Suchindram Theroor Birds Sanctuary

=== Regions of Tamil Nadu ===
==== Ecoregions of Tamil Nadu ====
Ecoregions in Tamil Nadu

==== Administrative divisions of Tamil Nadu ====
Administrative divisions of Tamil Nadu

- Districts of Tamil Nadu
  - Municipalities of Tamil Nadu

===== Districts of Tamil Nadu =====
- Districts of Tamil Nadu

===== Municipalities of Tamil Nadu =====
Municipalities of Tamil Nadu

- Capital of Tamil Nadu: Capital of Tamil Nadu
- Cities of Tamil Nadu

=== Demography of Tamil Nadu ===
Demographics of Tamil Nadu

== Government and politics of Tamil Nadu ==
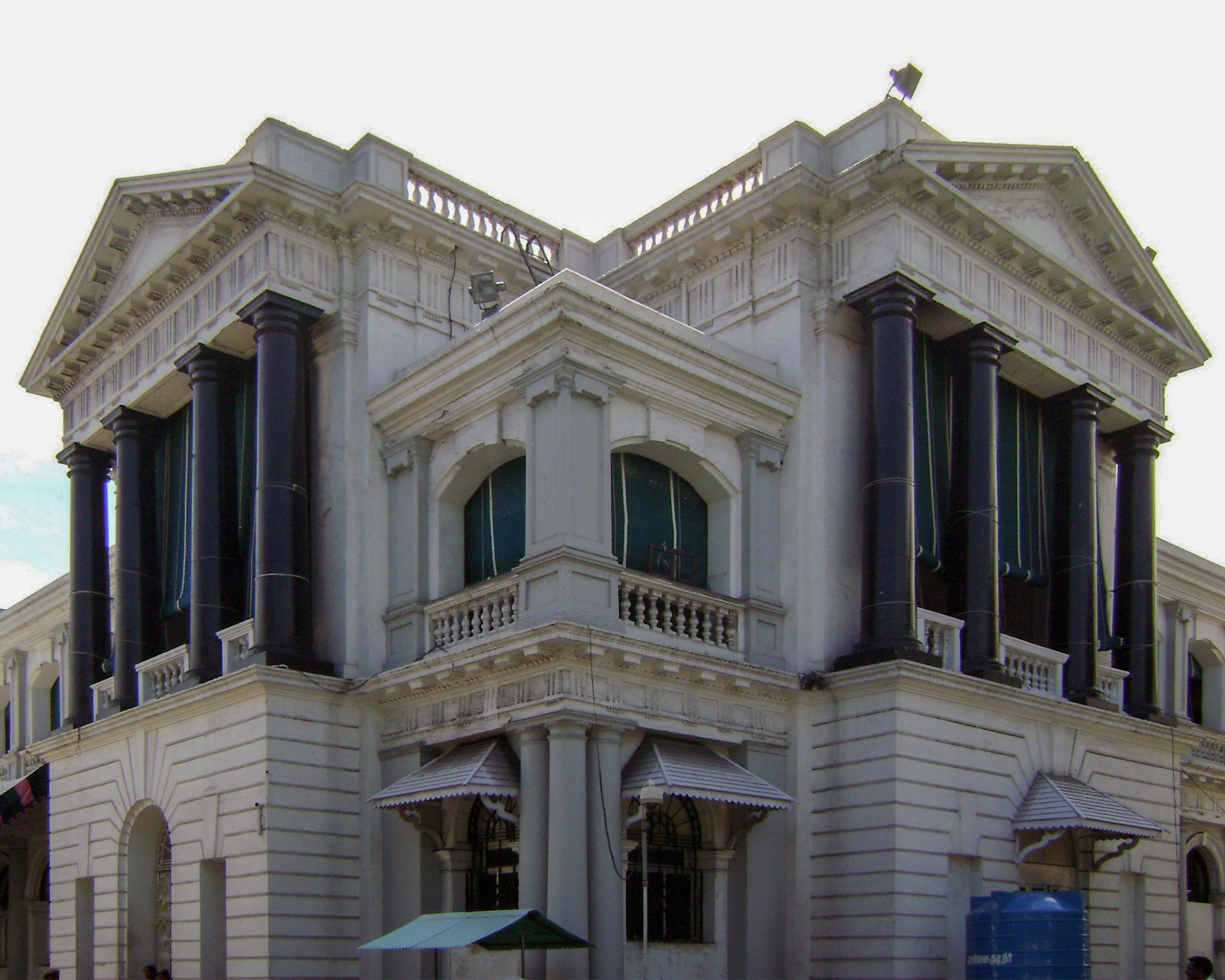
The Fort St. George, Chennai

Politics of Tamil Nadu

- Form of government: Indian state government (parliamentary system of representative democracy)
- Capital of Tamil Nadu: chennai
- Elections in Tamil Nadu
  - (specific elections)

=== Union government in Tamil Nadu ===
- Rajya Sabha members from Tamil Nadu
- Tamil Nadu Pradesh Congress Committee
- Indian general election, 2009 (Tamil Nadu)
- Indian general election, 2014 (Tamil Nadu)

=== Branches of the government of Tamil Nadu ===
Government of Tamil Nadu

==== Executive branch of the government of Tamil Nadu ====
- Head of state: Governor of Tamil Nadu
- Head of government: Chief Minister of Tamil Nadu
- Council of Ministers of Tamil Nadu

==== Legislative branch of the government of Tamil Nadu ====
Tamil Nadu Legislative Assembly

- Constituencies of Tamil Nadu Legislative Assembly

==== Judicial branch of the government of Tamil Nadu ====
- Madras High Court
  - Chief Justice of Madras High Court

=== Law and order in Tamil Nadu ===
- Law enforcement in Tamil Nadu
  - Tamil Nadu Police

== History of Tamil Nadu ==
History of Tamil Nadu

== Culture of Tamil Nadu ==
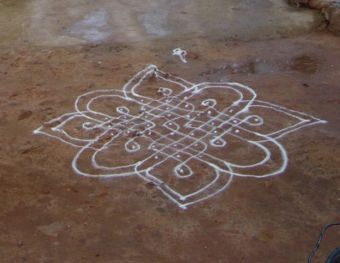
Kolam – a Traditional art form of the Tamil

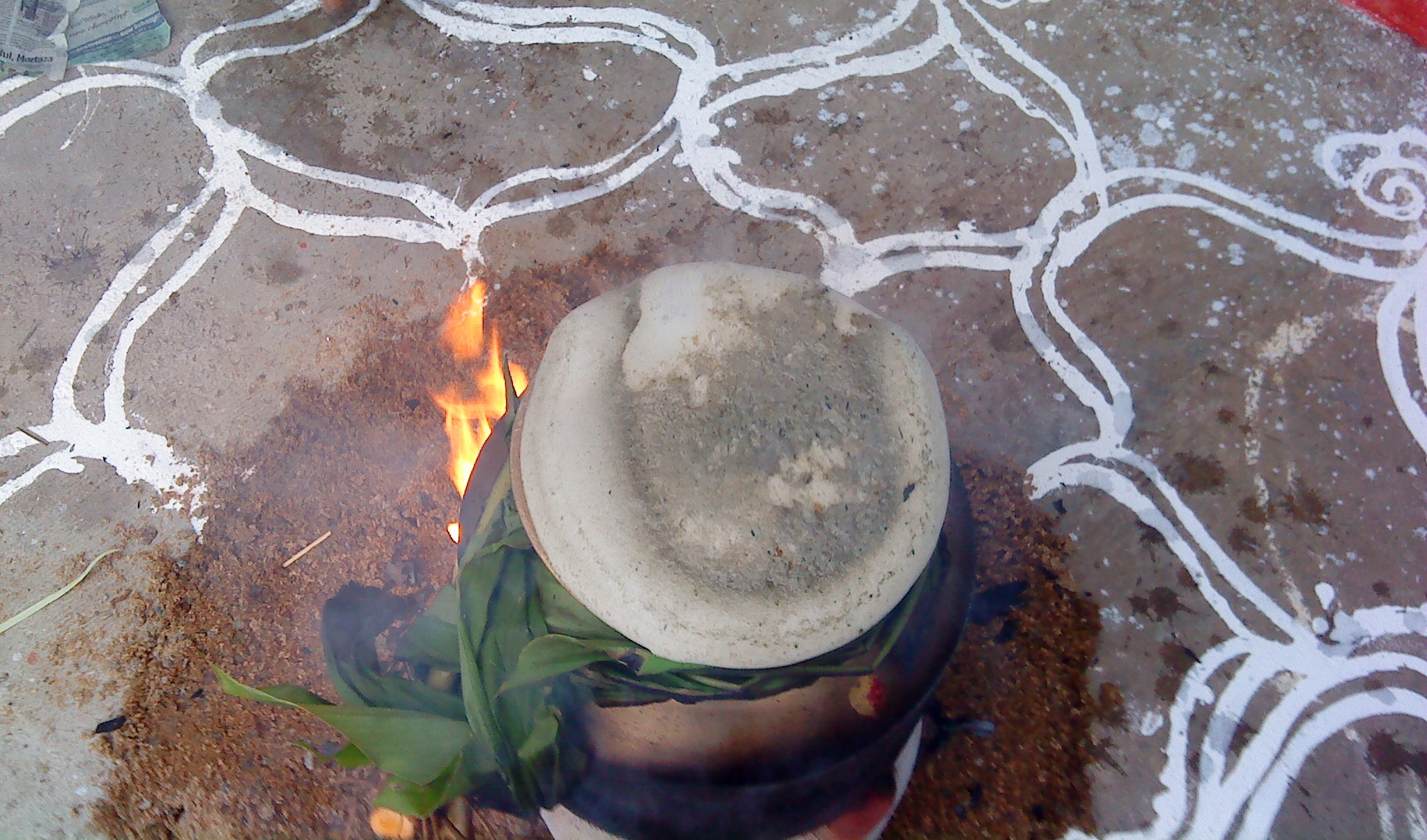
Overflowing during cooking of Pongal indicates overflowing of joy

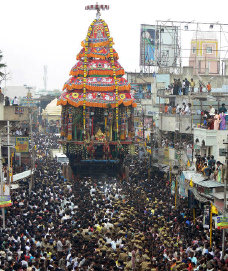
Tiruvannamalai Annamalaiyar chariot festival

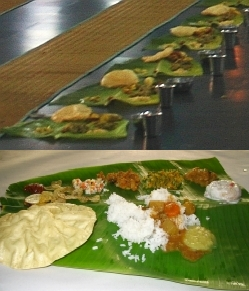
Traditional Tamil lunch served in banana leaf

Culture of Tamil Nadu

- Architecture of Tamil Nadu
  - Temples of Tamil Nadu
- Cuisine of Tamil Nadu
- Languages of Tamil Nadu
- Monuments in Tamil Nadu
  - Monuments of National Importance in Tamil Nadu
  - State Protected Monuments in Tamil Nadu
- World Heritage Sites in Tamil Nadu

=== Art in Tamil Nadu ===
- Cinema of Tamil Nadu
- Karakattam
- Nadaswaram
- Melam
- mayilāṭṭam
- ōyilāttam
- Bharatanatyam
- Devadasis
- Terukkuttu
- Kattaikkuttu

=== Literature of Tamil Nadu ===
Tamil literature

- Tirukkural
- Tamil Sangams
- Tiruvalluvar
- Paripaatal
- Subramanya Bharathy
- Bharathidasan
- Jallikattu

=== Music of Tamil Nadu ===
Music of Tamil Nadu

- Thevaram
- Carnatic music
- Villuppāṭṭu
- Nāṭṭuppuṟappāṭṭu
- Ballads
- Tyagaraja
- Muthuswami Dikshitar
- Syama Sastri
- Thiruvaiyaru
- Tamil Trinity
- Muthu Thandavar
- Arunachala Kavi
- Marimutthu Pillai
- Madras Music Season

=== Festivals in Tamil Nadu ===
- Pongal
- Tamil New Year
- Dasara
- Vinayaka Chathurthi
- Eid ul-Fitr
- Easter

=== People of Tamil Nadu ===
People of Tamil Nadu

- People from Tamil Nadu

=== Religion in Tamil Nadu ===
Religion in Tamil Nadu

- Christianity in Tamil Nadu
- Hinduism in Tamil Nadu
  - Temples of Tamil Nadu

=== Sports in Tamil Nadu ===
Sports in Tamil Nadu

- Cricket in Tamil Nadu
  - Tamil Nadu Cricket Association
  - Tamil Nadu cricket team
- Football in Tamil Nadu
  - Tamil Nadu football team

=== Symbols of Tamil Nadu ===
Symbols of Tamil Nadu

- Animal: Nilgiri Tahr
- Bird: Emerald Dove
- Dance: Bharatanatyam
- Fish:
- Flower: Gloriosa Lily
- Motto: (Tamil: வாய்மையே வெல்லும், romanized: Vaimaiye Vellum)
- Seal of Tamil Nadu
- Song: "Invocation to Tamil Mother"
- Sport: Sadugudu
- Tree: Palm Tree

== Economy and infrastructure of Tamil Nadu ==
Economy of Tamil Nadu

- Tourism in Tamil Nadu
- Transport in Tamil Nadu
  - Airports in Tamil Nadu

== Education in Tamil Nadu ==
Education in Tamil Nadu

- Institutions of higher education in Tamil Nadu
- Schools of Equality

== Health in Tamil Nadu ==
Health in Tamil Nadu

== See also ==
- Outline of India
