= S. Rajendran (AIADMK politician, Ariyalur) =

Indian politician

Thamarai S. Rajendran

Member of the Tamil Nadu Legislative Assembly
- Incumbent
- Assumed office 11 May 2026
- Preceded by: K. Chinnappa
- Constituency: Ariyalur
- In office 19 May 2016 – 12 May 2021
- Preceded by: Durai. Manivel
- Succeeded by: K. Chinnappa
- Constituency: Ariyalur

Personal details
- Born: Rajendran; 4 March 1960 (age 66) Ariyalur, Tamil Nadu, India
- Party: All India Anna Dravida Munnetra Kazhagam
- Occupation: Agriculture

Thamarai S. Rajendran is an Indian politician and a former Member of the Legislative Assembly (MLA) of Tamil Nadu. He hails from Venkatramapuram village in the Ariyalur district.

Having completed his school education up to the ninth grade in Ariyalur, Rajendran is a member of the All India Anna Dravida Munnetra Kazhagam (AIADMK) party. He was elected to the Tamil Nadu Legislative Assembly in the 2016 elections, representing the Ariyalur Assembly constituency.

== Electoral performance ==
Election	Constituency	Political party	Result	Vote %	Opposition			Ref
Election	Constituency	Political party	Result	Vote %	Candidate	Political party	Vote %	Ref
2016	Ariyalur	AIADMK	Won	41.94%	S. S. Sivasankar	DMK	40.97%	
2026	Ariyalur	AIADMK	Won	40.37%	Latha Balu	DMK	29.98%	
