= G. Sivaperumal =

Indian politician

Member of Tamil Nadu Legislative Assembly
- In office 1971–1976
- Preceded by: A. R. Karuppaiyan
- Succeeded by: T. Aarumugam
- Constituency: Ariyalur

Personal details
- Born: Ariyalur
- Party: DMK

K. Sivaperumal was an Indian politician and a former Member of the Tamil Nadu Legislative Assembly. He hailed from Ariyalur in the state of Tamil Nadu. He completed his school education at Ariyalur High School. Sivaperumal was elected to the Tamil Nadu Legislative Assembly from the Ariyalur constituency in the 1971 election.

== Electoral performance ==
Election	Constituency	Political party	Result	Vote %	Opposition			Ref
Election	Constituency	Political party	Result	Vote %	Candidate	Political party	Vote %	Ref
1971	Ariyalur	DMK	Won	64.18%	R. Sambasivam Moopanar	INC	30.20%	
