= Droog =

Droog may refer to:

- Droog, a Nadsat slang term for "friend" in Anthony Burgess's novel A Clockwork Orange and the Stanley Kubrick film adaptation
- The Droogs, a United States rock group named after the Nadsat term
- The Droogs (renamed to The Gandharvas), a Canadian rock group
- Droogs (rocks), steep rocks in India
- Droog Fort, Coonoor, Tamil Nadu, India
- Droog (company), a Netherlands-based design company
- Your Old Droog, a.k.a. Dmitry Kutsenko, a Ukrainian-born American rapper and producer from Brooklyn, New York
