= Sendurai =

- Town panchayat
- Location of Sendurai in Tamil Nadu Sendurai (India)
- Coordinates: 11°32.44′N 79°27.27′E
- Country: India
- State: Tamil Nadu
- District: Ariyalur
- Taluk: Sendurai

Government
  - Type: Sendurai Panchayat town
  - Body: Nagar panchayat

Population (2011)
  - Total: 9,643

Languages
  - Official: Tamil
- Time zone: UTC+5:30 (IST)
- Postal code: 621714
- Website: Sendurai town Panchayat

Sendurai is a Panchayat town and Taluk in Sendurai taluk in the Ariyalur district of the Indian state of Tamil Nadu. It is about 225.8 kilometres (140.3 mi) from the state capital of Chennai.

== Government and politics ==
Ariyalur (state assembly constituency) is a separate assembly constituency falling under Chidambaram Lok Sabha constituency.
