= Kethanur =

- neighbourhood
- Location in Tamil Nadu, India Kethanur (India)
- Coordinates: 10.91°N 77.26°E
- Country: India
- State: Tamil Nadu
- District: Tirupur
- Elevation: 311 m (1,020 ft)

Population (2011)
  - Total: 3,403

Languages
  - Official: Tamil
- Time zone: UTC+5:30 (IST)
- PIN: 641671
- Telephone code: +91-4225
- Vehicle registration: TN 42

Kethanur is a village situated in Tirupur District, Tamil Nadu.

== Education ==
The quality of education is high when compared to other villages in Tamil Nadu.

The Kethanur Government Higher Secondary School has catered quality education to the villagers in and around Kethanur. The village has a "Balvadi" Children's school with 150 kids. Here the kids are educated in a playway method. They are provided with nutritious food and frequent medical checkups are conducted. The kids are checked for vaccination and provided accordingly.

The Elementary School of Kethanur was started in 1917 and it has been upgraded as a Middle School in later years. The school was upgraded to Higher Secondary School in the year 2000. The Students from Vadugapalayam, Chittambalam, Mandiripalayam, Vavipalayam, Kullamapalayam, Elavandi, E. Vadugapalayam, Karasamadai, Manasipalayam, etc., utilise this Kethanur Government School. The School is well equipped with lab, furniture, and a playground for the students. The Kethanur Government School was awarded "Best Performer" for achieving 100% result in SSLC continuously for 10 years.

== Village Administration ==
The village is currently administered by a special officer.

The Kethanur Village operates with Village Panchayat. Policy making and legislative authorities are vested in the Ward Members, Governing Body. The Village President is responsible for carrying out the Governing Body's policies and overseeing the day-to-day operations of the Village. The Village panchayat provides general administrative services for the Kethanur Village as a whole. The staff works directly with the Village panchayat and directs all Village activities. Additional duties like the health inspection program, census, special programs for the school are carried away by the Youth of NSS, "Sports Club" of Kethanur and the school Alumni. Kethanur has also been the venue chosen for the annual national rally championship. Kethanur has the likes of international car racer Gaurav Gill and other international rally racers.

Kethanur also has a Marriage Hall, Perumal Temple, Mariamman Temple and a State Bank of India Branch. There is also a weekly Market on every Wednesday.
