= Ariyalur Alanduraiyar Temple =

Shaivist temple in Tamil Nadu, India

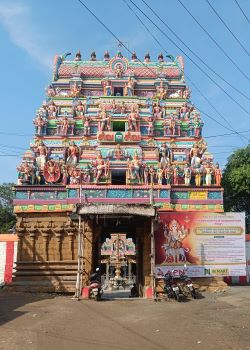

Alanduraiyar Temple is a Shiva temple in Ariyalur in Ariyalur District of Tamil Nadu, India.

== Presiding deity ==
The presiding deity is known as Ananduraiyar. The Goddess of the temple is Arundavanayaki.

== Kumbhabhishekham ==
The Kumbhabhishekham of the temple was held on 1 June 2023. The Mandalabishegam was held on 15 July 2023.
