= Kodandaramaswamy Temple, Ariyalur =

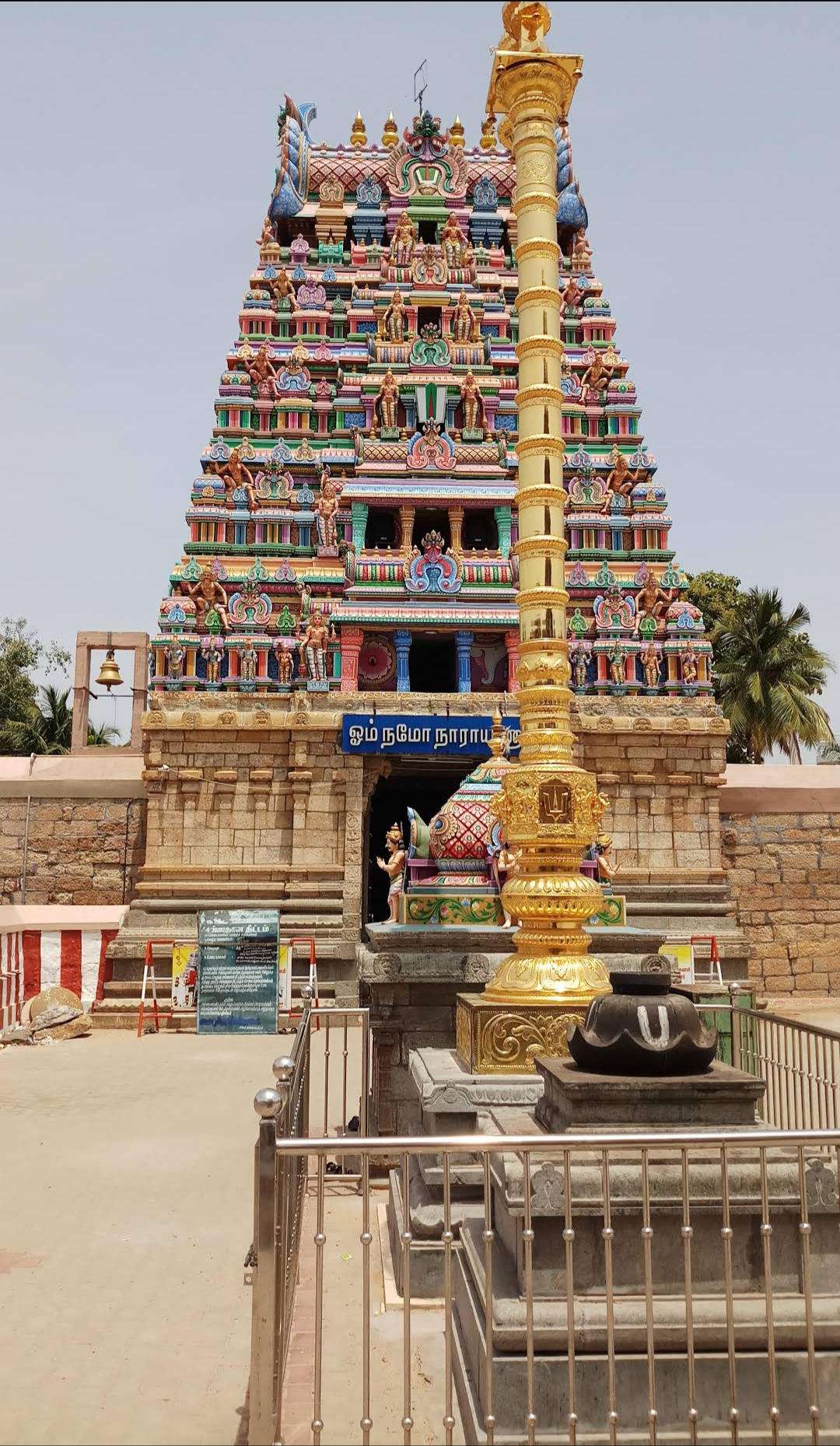
- Rajagopuram of the temple

Religion
- Affiliation: Hinduism
- District: Ariyalur in Tamil Nadu
- Deity: Lord Vishnu

Location
- Location: Ariyalur
- State: Tamil Nadu
- Country: India

Kodandaramaswamy Temple is a Hindu temple in the town of Ariyalur in Tamil Nadu, India.The presiding deity is Vishnu. However, there is a shrine with the idols of Rama, Sita and Lakshmana. The temple was constructed by a local chieftain of Ariyalur. The earliest inscription in the temple is dated to 1635 CE.

== Gallery ==
Exterior front view of the Kodandaramaswamy Temple, Ariyalur

Bali peedam, flagstaff and rajagopuram

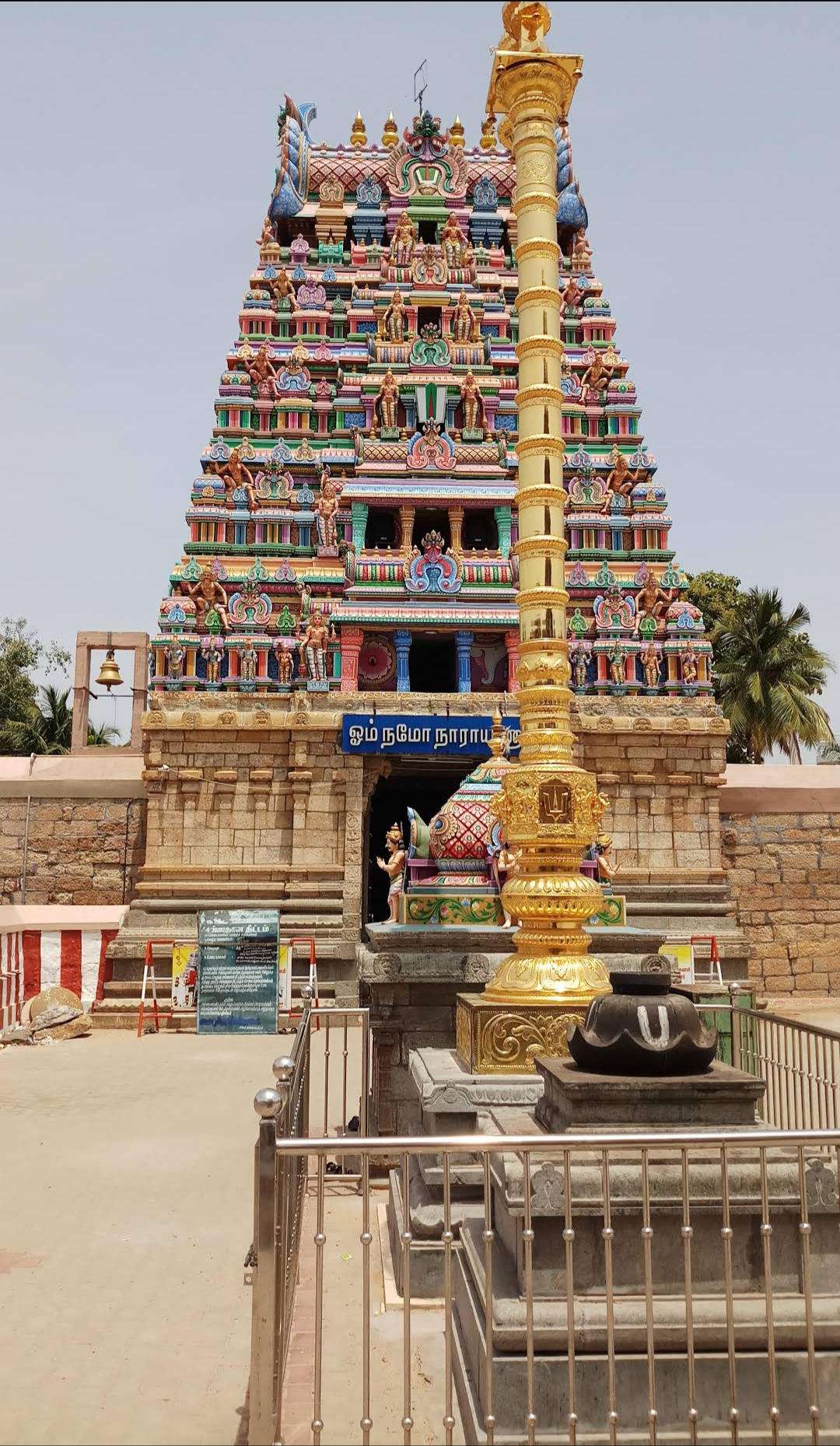
Rajagopuram, flagstaff and bali peedam of the temple

Temple tank (pushkarani), flagstaff and rajagopuram

Ayiramkal (thousand-pillared) mandapa

Paramapada vasal (gateway to Vaikunta)

Inner prakara of the temple

Shrine of Sri Dharma Sastha (Ayyappan)

Shrine of Sri Anjaneyar (Hanuman)

Tulasi madam of the temple

Front view of the Paramapada vasal

Shrine of Sri Andal Nachiyar

Shrines of Nammazhwar, Ramanujar and Alavandar

Alwars shrine

Shrine housing the sacred feet of Sri Rama

Exterior view of the temple
