= Ethnic groups in Tamil Nadu =

Tamil Nadu is one of the 28 states of India. Its capital and largest city is Chennai (formerly known as Madras). Tamil Nadu lies in the southernmost part of the Indian Peninsula and is bordered by the States of Puducherry, Kerala, Karnataka and Andhra Pradesh. It is the tenth-largest state in India and the seventh most populous state.

As of 2011 census, Tamil is spoken as the first language by 88.3% of the population followed by Telugu by 5.87 percent, Kannada by 1.78 percent, Urdu by 1.75 per cent, Malayalam by 1.01 percent and other languages by 1.24 percent.

== Tamil people ==
The Tamils are an ethnolinguistic group. Tamilians are living in Tamil Nadu. According to the 2011 census, they number 69 million in the state of Tamil Nadu.

Tamils are native to Tamil Nadu and Puducherry in South India, and northern and eastern Sri Lanka.

Native speakers of Tamil make up 89.43% of the total population of Tamil Nadu and 6.32% of the total population of India making it the fifth-most spoken language in the country.

== Telugu people ==
The Telugu people or Telugu are also a Dravidian ethnic group of India. They are the native speakers of the Telugu language. According to Census of India, Telugu language has 74 million speakers making it as the third largest spoken language in India after Hindi and Bengali. They are native to the South Indian states of Andhra Pradesh and Telangana. Telugu is also the most widely spoken language in South India. In Tamil Nadu, they are found in Chennai, Madurai, Coimbatore, Trichy, Dindigul, Virudhunagar, Sivakasi, Thiruvannamalai, Vellore, Thanjavur, Tuticorin, Dharmapuri, Salem, Erode, Karur, Namakkal, Thanjavur, Tiruppur, Theni, Perambalur and Ariyalur districts.

According to the 2011 census, Telugu is spoken by 5.87% of the population of Tamil Nadu, making it the second-most spoken language in the state.

== Kannada people ==
Kannada is a language belonging to the Dravidian family. Kannada-speakers are native to Karnataka, located north-west of Tamil Nadu.

Kannada is the third-most spoken language in Tamil Nadu followed by 1.78%. There are more than 20 lakhs Kannadigas in Tamil Nadu. The recent migrants from Karnataka speak Kannada, while the older migrants are bilingual in both Kannada and Tamil.

The presence of Kannada-speaking people in Tamil Nadu is seen since 7th century, various Kannada kingdoms like Western Gangas, Chalukyas, Rashtrakuta, Hoysalas and Vijaynagara made portions of modern Tamil Nadu as their dominions, especially the Kongu Nadu region. Kannada rulers of Hoysala and Vijayanagara Empire played a major role in the politics of Tamil-country from being Kanchi, Tiruvannamalai, Srirangam as their capital from the beginning of 8th century to the end of the Vijayanagara Empire, especially during the period of Islamic invasions in south the rulers Hoysala and the Vijayanagara played a major role in protecting the Hindu shrines of Tamil Nadu from northern invasions in south

They are largely found in the districts of Viruthunagar, Dharmapuri, Salem, Coimbatore, and Erode, and Krishnagiri district especially Hosur bordering Karnataka, According to the 1971 census, among metropolitan areas, Salem had the largest Kannada-speaking population.

== Malayali people ==
Malayalikal are the native speakers of Malayalam language, which has official status in the state of Kerala, Lakshadweep and Puducherry.

According to the 2011 census, Malayalam is spoken by 1.01% of the total population of Tamil Nadu. Native speakers of Malayalam are mostly concentrated in the western districts of Kanyakumari, Tirunelveli, Coimbatore, Nilgiris and Theni. In 1971, among metropolitan areas, Coimbatore had the largest Malayalam-speaking population.

== Badaga people ==
The Badagas are the speakers of the Badagu language. They are referred to as the first amongst the primitive tribes of the Nilgiris District by the colonial British rulers. The Nilgiris and the Badagas have a uniqueness. The Badaga language has no script of its own, similar to other non-lettered languages spoken in the Nilgiris by other tribal groups such as the Todas, Kotas and Kurumbas. The Badaga language was the language of communication between these tribal groups. The Badagas are the dominant tribal group and dominant land owners of the Nilgiris and possess a unique culture and attire. Almost all places in the Nilgiris District derive their name from the Badaga language. The Badgas worship Hethaiamman and Hiriyodiyya.

== Marathi people ==
Marathis or Maharashtrians are an ethnolinguistic group who speak Marathi, an Indo-Aryan language. They are native to the state of Maharashtra in western India.

As per the 2001 census, Marathi-speakers constitute a little over 0.1% of the total population of Tamil Nadu. They consist mostly of the Thanjavur Marathi people who inhabit the Cauvery Delta region and immigrants who settled in northern Tamil Nadu during the Maratha occupation of Gingee. Native-speakers of Marathi are mainly found in Thanjavur, Kumbakonam, Tiruchirapalli, Chennai, Krishnagiri, Dharmapuri, Salem and Vellore. Having lived for centuries in Tamil Nadu, the Thanjavur Marathi people are proficient in Tamil.

== Saurashtra people ==
Saurashtrians are an ethnolinguistic group of people who speak the Saurashtra language, an Indo-Aryan language, residing in the Indian states of Tamil Nadu, Kerala, Andhra Pradesh and Karnataka.

Saurashtra, once spoken in the Saurashtra region of Gujarat, is spoken today chiefly by a small population of Saurashtrians settled in parts of Tamil Nadu. With the Saurashtrian language being the only Indo-Aryan language employing a Dravidian script and is heavily influenced by the Dravidian languages such as Tamil and Telugu. However, Census of India places the language under Gujarati. Official figures show the number of speakers of Saurashtra as 185,420 in Tamil Nadu (2001 census). Madurai in the southern part of Tamil Nadu has the highest number of Saurashtrians. They are also present in significant numbers in Ambur, Ammapettai, Ammayappan, Aranthangi, Arni, Ayyampettai, Bhuvanagiri, Chennai, Dharasuram, Dindigul, Erode, Kancheepuram, Kanyakumari, Karaikudi, Kottar, Kumbakonam, Namakkal, Nilakottai, Palani, Palayamkottai, Paramakudi, Parambur, Periyakulam, Puducherry, Pudukkottai, Rajapalayam, Ramanathapuram, Salem, Thanjavur, Thirubhuvanam, Thiruvaiyaru, Thiruvarur, Thuvarankurichi, Tirunelveli, Tiruvannamalai, Trichy, Vaniyambadi, Veeravanalur, Vellanguli, Vellore, Madurai, Tiruppur and Walajapet.

== Other ethnic groups ==
Some of the smaller ethnic groups who reside in Tamil Nadu are the Tuluvas, Marwaris, Gujaratis, Sindhis, Punjabis and Biharis. Sikhs from the Punjab and Jains from Rajasthan are found in fairly appreciable numbers in the cities of Chennai, Coimbatore, Salem, Tiruchirapalli, Madurai, Tirunelveli. The city of Coimbatore has a significant population of Konkani-speaking Gaud Saraswat Brahmins who had migrated from Karnataka. Tamil Nadu also has a population of about 300 Zoroastrians most of whom reside in the neighbourhood of Royapuram in Chennai.
