= Vadaveekam =

Vadaveekam is a village near Jayankondam, Ariyalur district, in the Indian state of Tamil Nadu.
