= Durai Manivel =

Indian politician

Durai Manivel is an Indian politician and former member of the Tamil Nadu Legislative Assembly from the Ariyalur constituency, represented the Anna Dravida Munnetra Kazhagam party.

== Electoral performance ==
Election	Constituency	Political party	Result	Vote %	Opposition			Ref
Election	Constituency	Political party	Result	Vote %	Candidate	Political party	Vote %	Ref
2011	Ariyalur	AIADMK	Won	47.77%	D. Amaramoorthy	INC	38.17%	
2021	Ariyalur	AMMK	Lost	0.91%	K. Chinnappa	DMK	46.45%	-
