= Vadugapalayam =

Vadugapalayam Vadugapalayam
- village
- Nickname: Vadugai
- Country: India
- State: Tamil Nadu
- District: Ariyalur

Government
  - Type: State Govt
  - Body: TN

Area Panchayat
  - Total: 3 km^{2} (1.2 sq mi)

Population (2001)
  - Total: 1,884
  - Density: 630/km^{2} (1,600/sq mi)

Languages
  - Official: Tamil
- Time zone: UTC+5:30 (IST)
- Postal code: 642205
- Vehicle registration: TN-
- Coastline: 0 kilometres (0 mi)
- Sex ratio: 944 ♂/♀
- Literacy: 59.61%

Vadugapalayam is a village in the Ariyalur Taluk of Ariyalur district, Tamil Nadu, India. The city was part of Perambalur district until 2008 when it became part of the newly formed Ariyalur district.

== Demographics ==
As of 2001 census, Vadugapalayam had a total population of 1884 with 969 males and 915 females.
