= Demographics of Tamil Nadu =

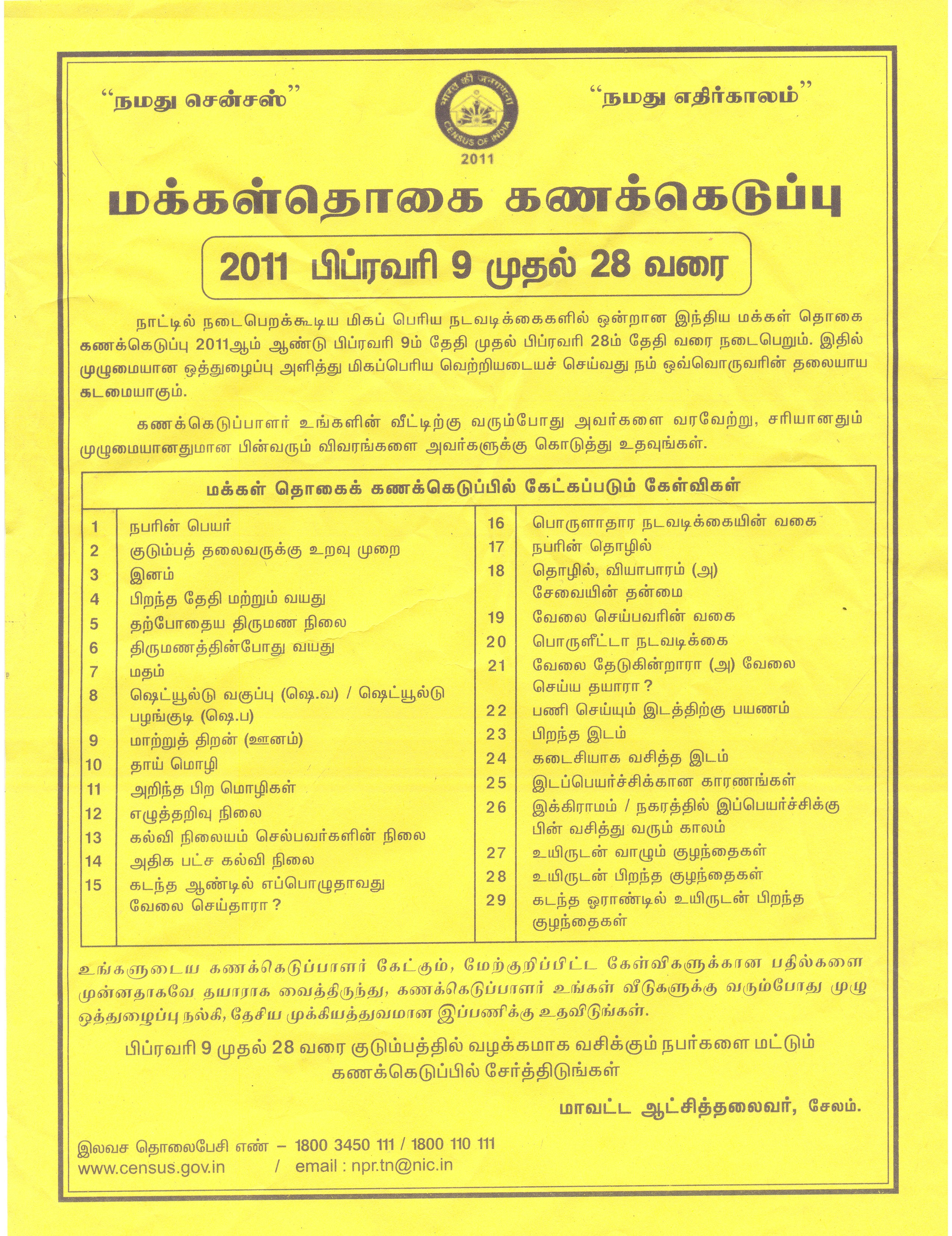
Notification from Census of India in 2011

Historical population
Year	Pop.	±% p.a.
1901	19,252,630	—
1911	20,902,616	+0.83%
1921	21,628,518	+0.34%
1931	23,472,099	+0.82%
1941	26,267,507	+1.13%
1951	30,119,047	+1.38%
1961	33,686,953	+1.13%
1971	41,199,168	+2.03%
1981	48,408,077	+1.63%
1991	55,858,946	+1.44%
2001	62,405,679	+1.11%
2011	72,147,030	+1.46%

As per the 2011 Census of India, Tamil Nadu had a population of 72,147,039, an increase from 62.4 million in 2001. There were 36,137,975 males and 36,009,064 females, with a sex ratio of 996 females per 1000 males. Its literacy rate was 80.09%, and about 10.51% of the population was below seven years old. It had a population density of 555 inhabitants per km^{2}. The state had a workforce of 27,878,282 (44.67%).

== By district ==
The following table shows the distributions of male and female populations of Tamil Nadu's districts, as of 2011:

Districts wise population
District	Total	Male	%	Female	%	Notes
Ariyalur	754,894	374,703	49.6	380,191	50.4	
Chennai	4,646,732	2,335,844	50.3	2,310,888	49.7	
Coimbatore	3,458,045	1,729,297	50.0	1,728,748	50.0	
Cuddalore	2,605,914	1,311,697	50.3	1,294,217	49.7	
Dharmapuri	1,506,843	774,303	51.4	732,540	48.6	
Dindigul	2,159,775	1,080,938	50.0	1,078,837	50.0	
Erode	2,251,744	1,129,868	50.2	1,121,876	49.8	
Kancheepuram	3,998,252	2,012,958	50.3	1,985,294	49.7	
Kanniyakumari	1,870,374	926,345	49.5	944,029	50.5	
Karur	1,064,493	528,184	49.6	536,309	50.4	
Krishnagiri	1,879,809	960,232	51.1	919,577	48.9	
Madurai	3,038,252	1,526,475	50.2	1,511,777	49.8	
Nagapattinam	1,616,450	798,127	49.4	818,323	50.6	
Namakkal	1,726,601	869,280	50.3	857,321	49.7	
Perambalur	565,223	282,157	49.9	283,066	50.1	
Pudukkottai	1,618,345	803,188	49.6	815,157	50.4	
Ramanathapuram	1,353,445	682,658	50.4	670,787	49.6	
Salem	3,482,056	1,781,571	51.2	1,700,485	48.8	
Sivaganga	1,339,101	668,672	49.9	670,429	50.1	
Thanjavur	2,405,890	1,182,416	49.1	1,223,474	50.9	
The Nilgiris	735,394	360,143	49.0	375,251	51.0	
Theni	1,245,899	625,683	50.2	620,216	49.8	
Thiruvallur	3,728,104	1,876,062	50.3	1,852,042	49.7	
Thiruvarur	1,264,277	626,693	49.6	637,584	50.4	
Thoothukudi	1,750,176	865,021	49.4	885,155	50.6	
Tiruchirappalli	2,722,290	1,352,284	49.7	1,370,006	50.3	
Tirunelveli	3,077,233	1,520,912	49.4	1,556,321	50.6	
Tiruppur	2,479,052	1,246,159	50.3	1,232,893	49.7	
Tiruvannamalai	2,464,875	1,235,889	50.1	1,228,986	49.9	
Vellore	3,936,331	1,961,688	49.8	1,974,643	50.2	
Viluppuram	3,458,873	1,740,819	50.3	1,718,054	49.7	
Virudhunagar	1,942,288	967,709	49.8	974,579	50.2	
Total	72,147,030	36,137,975	50.1	36,009,055	49.9	

== By religion ==
The following tables show the distribution of religious followers in Tamil Nadu, by number and percentage.

Religion in Tamil Nadu
Religion	2001	2011
Hinduism	54,985,079	63,188,168
Christianity	3,785,060	4,418,331
Islam	3,470,647	4,229,479
Jainism	83,359	89,265
Sikhism	9,545	14,601
Buddhism	5,393	11,186
Other	7,252	7,414
Not stated	n/a	188,586
Total	62,405,679	72,147,030

Religion in Tamil Nadu (%)
Religion	2001	2011
Hinduism	88.11	87.58
Christianity	6.06	6.12
Islam	5.56	5.86
Jainism	0.13	0.12
Sikhism	0.01	0.02
Buddhism	>0.01	0.01
Other	0.01	0.01
Not stated	n/a	0.26

== By language ==
First Languages of Tamil Nadu
	Speakers	Urban	Rural	Percentage of Population
Tamil	63,743,847	34,087,554	29,656,293	88.35
Telugu	4,234,216	1,973,842	2,260,374	5.87
Urdu	1,264,412	243,462	1,020,950	1.75
Kannada	1,141,976	606,611	535,365	1.58
Malayalam	718,977	104,745	614,232	1.00
Hindi	331,057	36,828	294,229	0.36
Saurashtra	238,556	15,721	222,835	0.33
Badaga	132,102	80,392	51,710	0.18
Marathi	85,380	18,833	66,547	0.12
Marwari	34,854	226	34,628	0.05
Gujrati	34,793	1,727	33,066	0.05
Bengali	22,930	2,496	20,434	0.03
Odia	21,132	7,203	13,929	0.03
Lambadi	9,794	9,522	272	0.01
Rajasthani	9,792	341	9,451	0.01

== See also ==
- Ethnic groups of Tamil Nadu
- Tamil people
