= Geography of Tamil Nadu =

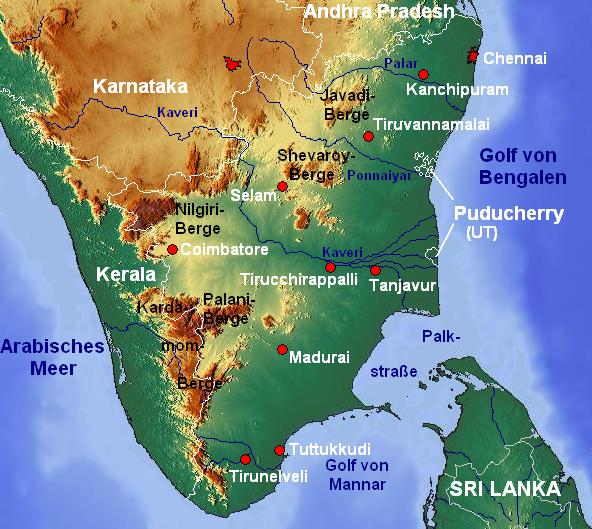
- Region: Indian Peninsula
- Area: Ranked 10th
  - Total: 130,058 km^{2} (50,216 sq mi)
- Borders: Kerala (West); Karnataka (Northwest); Andhra Pradesh (North); Bay of Bengal (East); Arabian Sea (South West); Indian Ocean (South)
- Terrain: Mountains: Western Ghats, Eastern Ghats

Tamil Nadu is the tenth largest state in India and covers an area of 130,058 square kilometres (50,216 sq mi). It is bordered by Kerala to the west, Karnataka to the northwest, Andhra Pradesh to the north, the Bay of Bengal to the east and the Indian Ocean to the south. Cape Comorin (Kanyakumari), the southernmost tip of the Indian Peninsula is located in south of Tamil Nadu.

== Terrain ==
The western, southern and north-western parts are hilly and mix of vegetation and arid. Tamil Nadu is the only state in India that has both the Western Ghat and the Eastern Ghat mountain ranges which both meet at the Nilgiri Hills. The Western Ghats dominate the entire western border with Kerala, effectively blocking much of the rain-bearing clouds of the South West Monsoon from entering the state. The eastern parts are fertile coastal plains. The northern parts are a mix of hills and plains. The central and the south-central regions are arid plains.

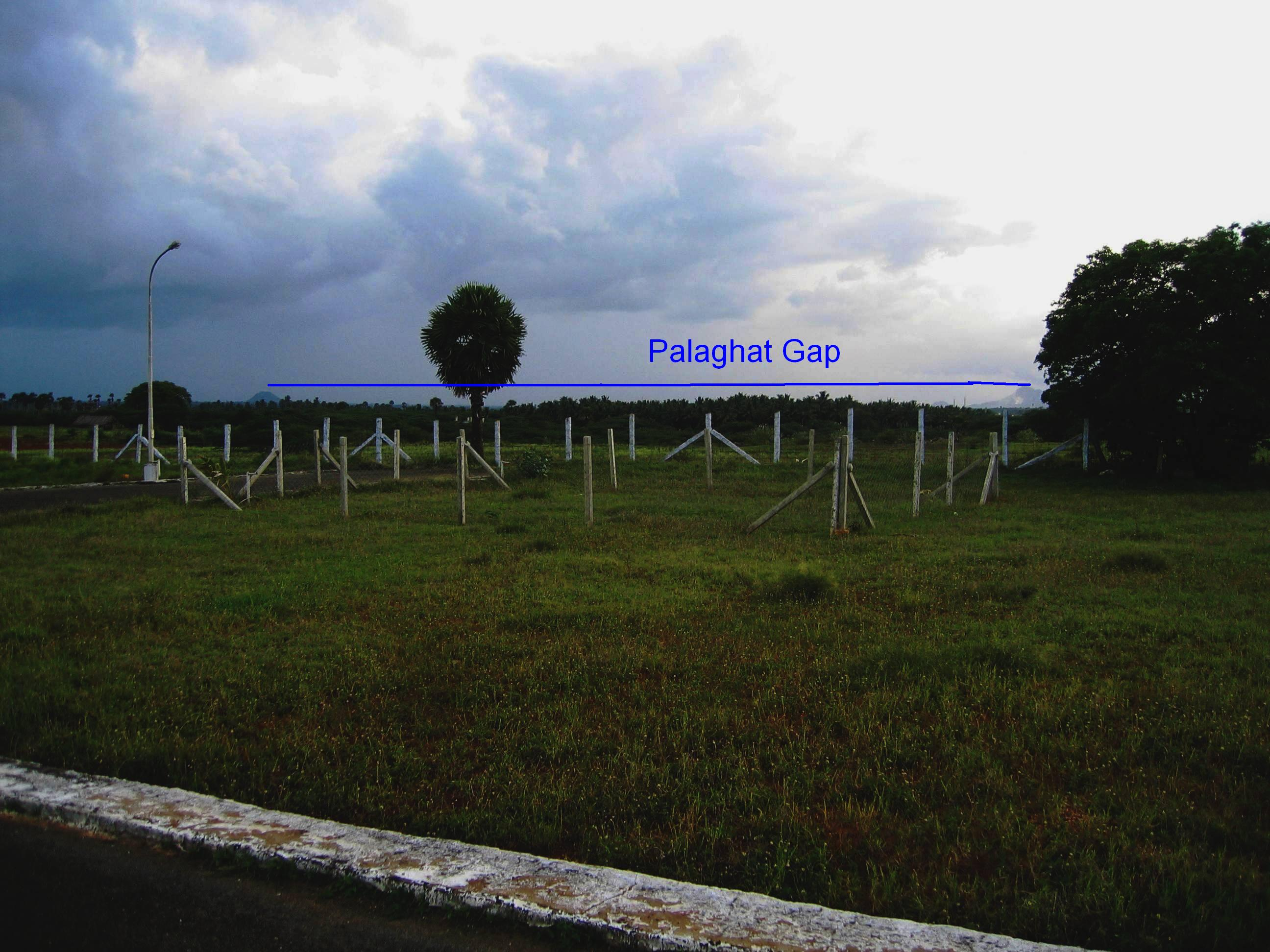
Palakkad gap allows south-west monsoon winds to pass through the western ghats producing rain in western Tamil Nadu

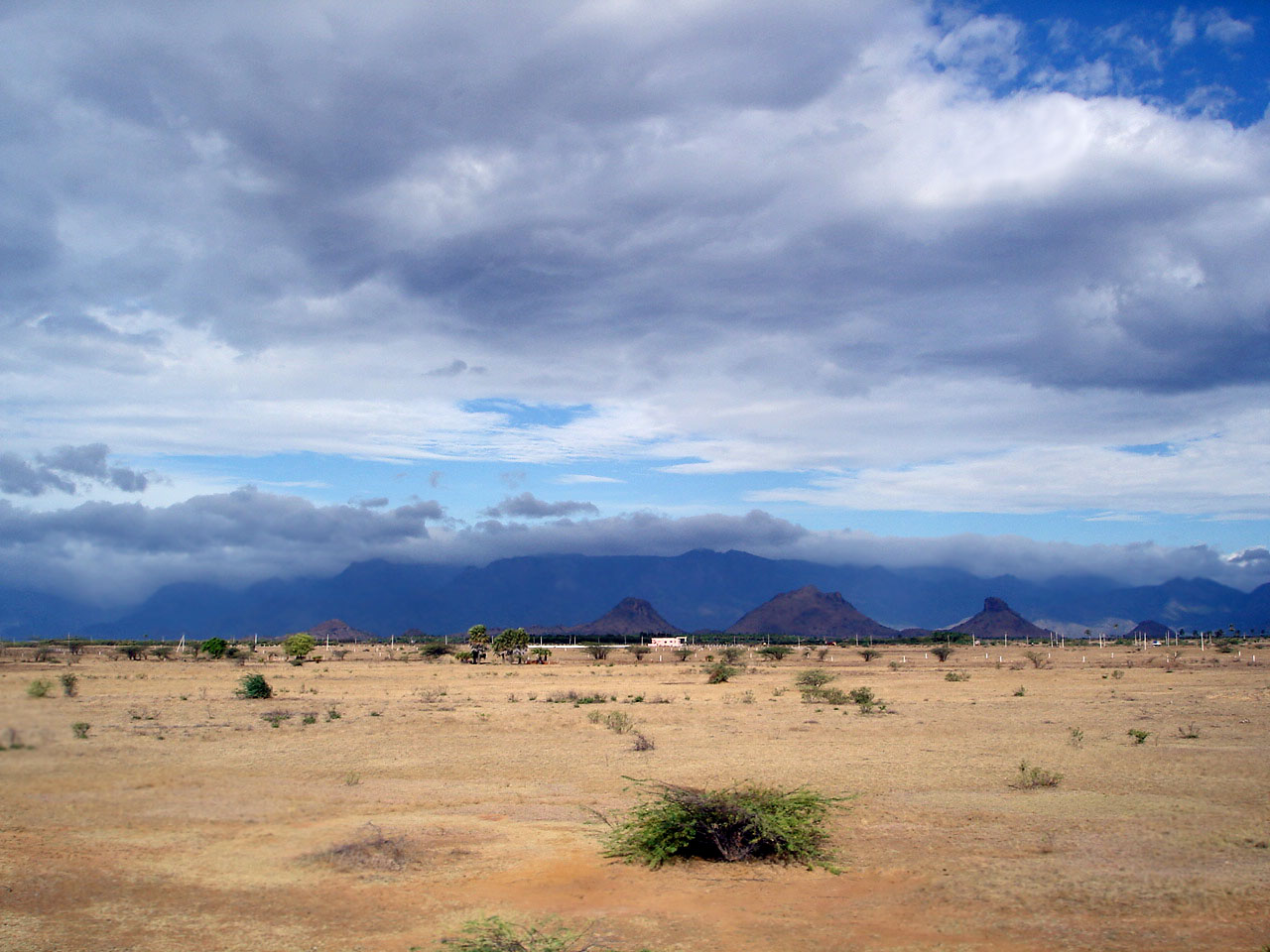
A semi-arid wasteland near Tirunelveli. Monsoon winds are prevented by the Agasthyamalai Range of the Western Ghats

== Natural hazards ==
Tamil Nadu has a coastline of about 1,076 kilometres (700 mi) which is the country's second longest coastline after Gujarat, Tamil Nadu's coastline bore the brunt of the 2004 Indian Ocean tsunami when it hit India, which caused 7,793 direct deaths in the state. Tamil Nadu falls mostly in a region of low seismic hazard with the exception of the western border areas that lie in a low to moderate hazard zone. Parts of this region have seismic activity bagging the M5.0 range.

== Climate ==
Tamil Nadu is heavily dependent on monsoon rains, and thereby is prone to droughts when the monsoons fail. The climate of the state ranges from wet rainforests to semi-arid plains, with some interior locations bordering on a desert climate. The state has distinct periods of rainfall, which are the advancing monsoon period, South-west monsoon (from June to September) with strong southwest winds, the North-east monsoon (from October to December), with dominant northeast winds, and the Dry season (from January to May). The normal annual rainfall of the state is about 945 mm (37.2 in), of which 48% is through the North East monsoon, and 32% through the South West monsoon. Since the state is entirely dependent on rains for recharging its water resources, monsoon failures lead to acute water scarcity and severe drought.

== Rivers and Water Bodies ==
Rivers and other water bodies are a prominent part of Tamil Nadu's geography. The state primarily contains east-flowing rivers that originate from the Western Ghats and empty out into the Bay of Bengal or the Palk Strait.

=== Kaveri (Cauvery) River ===
The Kaveri, also spelled Cauvery, is the largest and arguably the most significant river in Tamil Nadu. Due to its status as a sacred river in Southern India, it is often referenced throughout Tamil literature for its sanctity and referred to as the Daksina Ganga, or the "Ganges of the South", by Hindus. The river starts on Brahmagiri Hill in the Western Ghats of southwestern Karnataka and flows southeast for around 765 km (475 miles) before ending at the Bay of Bengal, south of Cuddalore.

After descending the Eastern Ghats in a multitude of waterfalls, the Kaveri enters Tamil Nadu through a series of natural gorges, before eventually reaching Hogenakal Falls and flowing through a small gorge near Salem. This point is where the river meets the Mettur Dam, one of Tamil Nadu's most important water infrastructure. Mettur Dam was completed in 1934, stretching for 1,620 meters and 54 meters in height. Ultimately, the Mettur Project transformed the surrounding region into a key industrial and agricultural area by contributing to hydroelectric power and irrigation.

Further downstream at Tiruchirapalli, the Kaveri splits at Srirangam Island, indicating the beginning of its deltaic region. The resulting delta covers roughly 10,360 square kilometers and is often called the "garden of southern India" due to its agricultural productivity. The river also has a notable engineering history; the Grand Anicut, a 2nd century dam placed at the point of the river's division, is still in use, while a second dam made between 1836 and 1838 across the Kollidam (Coleroon) channel helped extend irrigation and prevent silting of the older system. The Kaveri's main tributaries consist of the Kabani, Amaravati, Bhavani, and Noyil.

== See also ==
- Droogs (rocks)
