= T. Arumugam =

Indian politician

T. Arumugam is an Indian politician and former Member of the Legislative Assembly of Tamil Nadu. He was elected to the Tamil Nadu legislative assembly as a Dravida Munnetra Kazhagam candidate from Ariyalur constituency in the 1977, 1980, and 1989 elections.

== Electoral performance ==
Election	Constituency	Political party	Result	Vote %	Opposition			Ref
Election	Constituency	Political party	Result	Vote %	Candidate	Political party	Vote %	Ref
1977	Ariyalur	DMK	Won	39.73%	Karuppiah Alias Asokan	AIADMK	38.14%	
1980	Ariyalur	DMK	Won	52.53%	Asokan	AIADMK	42.01%	
1984	Ariyalur	DMK	Lost	40.11%	S. Purushothaman	AIADMK	58.36%	
1989	Ariyalur	DMK	Won	43.60%	P. Elavazhagan	AIADMK	26.92%	
