= Ariyalur Assembly constituency =

One of the 234 State Legislative Assembly Constituencies in Tamil Nadu, in India

Coordinates: 11°8′14″N 79°4′40″E

Ariyalur
- Constituency No. 149 for the Tamil Nadu Legislative Assembly

Constituency details
- Country: India
- Region: South India
- State: Tamil Nadu
- District: Ariyalur
- Lok Sabha constituency: Chidambaram
- Established: 1951
- Total electors: 2,63,156
- Reservation: None

Member of Legislative Assembly
- 17th Tamil Nadu Legislative Assembly
- Incumbent Thamarai S. Rajendran
- Party: AIADMK
- Alliance: NDA
- Elected year: 2026

Ariyalur is a legislative assembly, that includes the city of Ariyalur. Its State Assembly Constituency number is 149. Until 2006, Ariyalur Assembly constituency was part of Perambalur Lok Sabha constituency. Since 2006, it has been a part of Chidambaram Lok Sabha constituency. It is one of the 234 State Legislative Assembly Constituencies in Tamil Nadu, in India.

== History ==
From the 1977 elections, the assembly seat was won by Dravida Munnetra Kazhagam (DMK) three times during the 1977, 1980 and 1989 elections, the All India Anna Dravida Munnetra Kazhagam (AIADMK) two times during the 2001 and 2011 elections, Indian National Congress once during 2006 and Tamil Maanila Congress once during the 1996 elections. In 2016 Member of Legislative Assembly (MLA) of the constituency was Thamarai S.Rajendran from the AIADMK Party. The current MLA since 2021 has been K. Chinnappa from DMK.

== Members of the Legislative Assembly ==
Election	Member	Party
1952	Palaniandi	Independent politician
1957	Ramalinga Padayachi	Indian National Congress
1962	R. Narayanan	Dravida Munnetra Kazhagam
1967	R. Karuppiam	Indian National Congress
1971	G. Sivaperumal	Dravida Munnetra Kazhagam
1977	T. Arumugam	Dravida Munnetra Kazhagam
1980	T. Arumugam	Dravida Munnetra Kazhagam
1984	S. Purushothaman	All India Anna Dravida Munnetra Kazhagam
1989	T. Arumugam	Dravida Munnetra Kazhagam
1991	S. Manimegalai	All India Anna Dravida Munnetra Kazhagam
1996	D. Amaramoorthy	Tamil Maanila Congress
2001	P. Elavazhagan	All India Anna Dravida Munnetra Kazhagam
2006	D. Amaramoorthy	Indian National Congress
2011	Durai. Manivel	All India Anna Dravida Munnetra Kazhagam
2016	S. Rajendran	All India Anna Dravida Munnetra Kazhagam
2021	K. Chinnappa	Dravida Munnetra Kazhagam
2026	S. Rajendran	All India Anna Dravida Munnetra Kazhagam

Madras State

== Election results ==
=== Assembly election 2026 ===
2026 Tamil Nadu Legislative Assembly election : Ariyalur
Party	Candidate	Votes	%	±%
AIADMK	S. Rajendran	95,219	40.37%	New
DMK	Latha Balu	70,721	29.98%	▼16.47
TVK	Sivakumar. M	57,359	24.32%	New
NTK	Pugazhendhi. D	8,527	3.62%	▼1.90
NOTA	None of the above	641	0.27%	▼0.35
Margin of victory		24,498	10.39%	▲8.95
Turnout		236,042	89.70%	▲4.49
Total valid votes		235,858		
Registered electors		263,156		▼0.68
AIADMK gain from DMK		Swing	▼6.08	

=== Assembly election 2021 ===
2021 Tamil Nadu Legislative Assembly election : Ariyalur
Party	Candidate	Votes	%	±%
DMK	K. Chinnappa	103,975	46.45%	▲5.48
AIADMK	Thamarai S. Rajendran	100,741	45.01%	▲3.07
NTK	Suguna Kumar	12,346	5.52%	▲4.98
AMMK	Durai. Manivel	2,044	0.91%	New
NOTA	None of the above	1,389	0.62%	▼0.28
Margin of victory		3,234	1.44%	▲0.47
Turnout		225,792	85.21%	▲0.22
Total valid votes		223,836		
Rejected ballots		567	0.25%	▲0.18
Registered electors		264,971		▲6.61
DMK gain from AIADMK		Swing	▲4.51	

=== Assembly election 2016 ===
2016 Tamil Nadu Legislative Assembly election : Ariyalur
Party	Candidate	Votes	%	±%
AIADMK	S. Rajendran	88,523	41.94%	▼5.83
DMK	S. S. Sivasankar	86,480	40.97%	New
DMDK	Rama Jayavel	13,599	6.44%	New
PMK	K. Thirumavalavan	13,529	6.41%	New
NOTA	None of the above	1,896	0.90%	New
Independent	R. Vijayakumar	1,348	0.64%	
IJK	C. Baskar	1,330	0.63%	▼4.48
Margin of victory		2,043	0.97%	▼8.62
Turnout		211,232	84.99%	▲0.16
Total valid votes		211,078		
Rejected ballots		154	0.07%	▲0.06
Registered electors		248,541		▲13.49
AIADMK hold		Swing		

=== Assembly election 2011 ===
2011 Tamil Nadu Legislative Assembly election : Ariyalur
Party	Candidate	Votes	%	±%
AIADMK	Durai. Manivel	88,726	47.77%	▲5.57
INC	D. Amaramoorthy	70,906	38.17%	▼7.19
IJK	C. Baskar	9,501	5.11%	New
Independent	R. Panneerselvam	7,099	3.82%	
BJP	P. Abirami	2,981	1.60%	▲0.76
Independent	T. Muruganantham	2,640	1.42%	
BSP	K. Neelamegam	2,267	1.22%	▲0.43
Independent	M. K. Muthusami	1,629	0.88%	
Margin of victory		17,820	9.59%	▲6.42
Turnout		185,766	84.83%	▲4.01
Total valid votes		185,749		
Rejected ballots		17	0.01%	▲0.01
Registered electors		218,992		▲33.61
AIADMK gain from INC		Swing	▲2.41	

=== Assembly election 2006 ===
2006 Tamil Nadu Legislative Assembly election : Ariyalur
Party	Candidate	Votes	%	±%
INC	D. Amaramoorthy	60,089	45.36%	New
AIADMK	M. Ravichandran	55,895	42.20%	New
DMDK	Rama Jayavel	8,630	6.52%	New
Independent	K. Mariyappan	2,936	2.22%	
BJP	K. Sekar	1,111	0.84%	New
BSP	M. Samidurai	1,041	0.79%	New
Margin of victory		4,194	3.17%	▼4.91
Turnout		132,472	80.82%	▲10.45
Total valid votes		132,460		
Registered electors		163,907		▼10.16
INC gain from AIADMK		Swing	▲4.33	

=== Assembly election 2001 ===
2001 Tamil Nadu Legislative Assembly election : Ariyalur
Party	Candidate	Votes	%	±%
AIADMK	P. Elavazhagan	52,676	41.03%	▲9.14
DMK	T. A. Kathiravan	42,297	32.95%	New
Independent	D. Punnyamoorthy	20,399	15.89%	
MDMK	K. Chinnappa	10,121	7.88%	▼2.53
Independent	N. Maheshkumaran	2,891	2.25%	
Margin of victory		10,379	8.08%	▼13.22
Turnout		128,385	70.37%	▼8.18
Total valid votes		128,384		
Registered electors		182,450		▲14.29
AIADMK gain from TMC(M)		Swing	▼12.16	

=== Assembly election 1996 ===
1996 Tamil Nadu Legislative Assembly election : Ariyalur
Party	Candidate	Votes	%	±%
TMC(M)	D. Amaramoorthy	62,157	53.19%	New
AIADMK	A. Elavarasan	37,263	31.89%	New
MDMK	K. Chinnappa	12,163	10.41%	New
PMK	P. Raja	2,926	2.50%	▼2.56
BJP	G. Ayyarappan	1,060	0.91%	▲0.24
Independent	M. Panneerselvam	804	0.69%	
Margin of victory		24,894	21.30%	▲0.92
Turnout		125,395	78.55%	▲2.44
Total valid votes		116,854		
Rejected ballots		8,729	6.96%	▲3.50
Registered electors		159,636		▲3.38
TMC(M) gain from AIADMK		Swing	▼3.81	

=== Assembly election 1991 ===
1991 Tamil Nadu Legislative Assembly election : Ariyalur
Party	Candidate	Votes	%	±%
AIADMK	S. Manimegalai	64,680	57.00%	New
DMK	K. Chinnappa	41,551	36.62%	▼6.98
PMK	R. Arivalagan	5,744	5.06%	New
BJP	A. Karuppaiah. N	755	0.67%	New
Margin of victory		23,129	20.38%	▲3.70
Turnout		117,536	76.11%	▼5.34
Total valid votes		113,474		
Rejected ballots		4,062	3.46%	▲1.40
Registered electors		154,420		▲13.42
AIADMK gain from DMK		Swing	▲13.40	

=== Assembly election 1989 ===
1989 Tamil Nadu Legislative Assembly election : Ariyalur
Party	Candidate	Votes	%	±%
DMK	T. Arumugam	47,353	43.60%	▲3.49
AIADMK	P. Elavazhagan	29,242	26.92%	New
INC	T. K. S. Swamynathan	21,247	19.56%	New
AIADMK	P. Ganesan	10,507	9.67%	New
Margin of victory		18,111	16.68%	▼1.57
Turnout		110,886	81.45%	▼1.12
Total valid votes		108,607		
Rejected ballots		2,279	2.06%	▼1.59
Registered electors		136,145		▲11.25
DMK gain from AIADMK		Swing	▼14.76	

=== Assembly election 1984 ===
1984 Tamil Nadu Legislative Assembly election : Ariyalur
Party	Candidate	Votes	%	±%
AIADMK	S. Purushothaman	56,815	58.36%	▲16.35
DMK	T. Arumugam	39,045	40.11%	▼12.42
Independent	T. K. Thangavel	996	1.02%	
Margin of victory		17,770	18.25%	▲7.73
Turnout		101,042	82.57%	▲6.48
Total valid votes		97,353		
Rejected ballots		3,689	3.65%	▲2.31
Registered electors		122,373		▲4.96
AIADMK gain from DMK		Swing	▲5.83	

=== Assembly election 1980 ===
1980 Tamil Nadu Legislative Assembly election : Ariyalur
Party	Candidate	Votes	%	±%
DMK	T. Arumugam	45,980	52.53%	▲12.80
AIADMK	Asokan	36,776	42.01%	New
Independent	A. S. Aramirdham	3,695	4.22%	
Independent	A. Ganesan	738	0.84%	
Margin of victory		9,204	10.52%	▲8.93
Turnout		88,716	76.09%	▲1.34
Total valid votes		87,531		
Rejected ballots		1,185	1.34%	▼0.48
Registered electors		116,590		▲8.32
DMK hold		Swing		

=== Assembly election 1977 ===
1977 Tamil Nadu Legislative Assembly election : Ariyalur
Party	Candidate	Votes	%	±%
DMK	T. Arumugam	31,380	39.73%	▼24.45
AIADMK	Karuppiah Alias Asokan	30,125	38.14%	New
INC	G. Srinivasan	12,359	15.65%	New
JP	T. Natarajan	3,781	4.79%	New
Independent	R. Krishnasamy	1,131	1.43%	
Margin of victory		1,255	1.59%	▼32.39
Turnout		80,457	74.75%	▼6.68
Total valid votes		78,989		
Rejected ballots		1,468	1.82%	▲1.82
Registered electors		107,638		▲11.50
DMK hold		Swing		

=== Assembly election 1971 ===
1971 Tamil Nadu Legislative Assembly election : Ariyalur
Party	Candidate	Votes	%	±%
DMK	G. Sivaperumal	48,320	64.18%	▲28.82
INC	R. Sambasivam Moopanar	22,740	30.20%	New
Independent	M. Ganesan	3,535	4.70%	
Independent	P. K. Thirunavukkarasu	692	0.92%	
Margin of victory		25,580	33.98%	▲31.97
Turnout		78,607	81.43%	▼1.72
Total valid votes		75,287		
Registered electors		96,537		▲8.30
DMK gain from INC		Swing	▲26.81	

=== Assembly election 1967 ===
1967 Madras State Legislative Assembly election : Ariyalur
Party	Candidate	Votes	%	±%
INC	R. Karuppiam	26,440	37.37%	▲10.10
DMK	G. Sepperumal	25,017	35.36%	▼28.98
Independent	S. Ramasami	19,294	27.27%	
Margin of victory		1,423	2.01%	▼35.06
Turnout		74,113	83.15%	▲13.57
Total valid votes		70,751		
Registered electors		89,136		▼8.03
INC gain from DMK		Swing	▼26.97	

=== Assembly election 1962 ===
1962 Madras State Legislative Assembly election : Ariyalur
Party	Candidate	Votes	%	±%
DMK	R. Narayanan	41,721	64.34%	New
INC	R. Viswanathan	17,681	27.27%	▼0.17
TNP	M. Vadivel	3,095	4.77%	New
Independent	A. Balakrishnan	2,346	3.62%	
Margin of victory		24,040	37.07%	▲33.95
Turnout		67,436	69.58%	▲22.52
Total valid votes		64,843		
Registered electors		96,922		▲6.59
DMK gain from INC		Swing	▲36.90	

=== Assembly election 1957 ===
1957 Madras State Legislative Assembly election : Ariyalur
Party	Candidate	Votes	%	±%
INC	Ramalinga Padayachi	11,741	27.44%	▲1.95
Independent	R. Narayanan	10,404	24.31%	
Independent	Haji Abdul Kadir Jamali	6,992	16.34%	
Independent	Dhanaraj	4,797	11.21%	
Independent	Manickam	3,069	7.17%	
Independent	Arasan	2,640	6.17%	
Independent	Thangavelu	2,154	5.03%	
Independent	Vadivelu	992	2.32%	
Margin of victory		1,337	3.12%	▼0.48
Turnout		42,789	47.06%	▼12.47
Total valid votes		42,789		
Registered electors		90,932		▲37.87
INC gain from Independent		Swing	▼1.65	

=== Assembly election 1952 ===
1952 Madras State Legislative Assembly election : Ariyalur
Party	Candidate	Votes	%	±%
Independent	Palaniandi	11,422	29.09%	New
INC	Razar	10,007	25.49%	New
Independent	Shanmughasundara Mudaliar	8,289	21.11%	New
Independent	Muthuswamy	8,141	20.74%	New
Independent	Periaswami Padyachi	1,403	3.57%	New
Margin of victory		1,415	3.60%	
Turnout		39,262	59.53%	
Total valid votes		39,262		
Registered electors		65,957		
Independent win (new seat)				
