= Climate of Tamil Nadu =

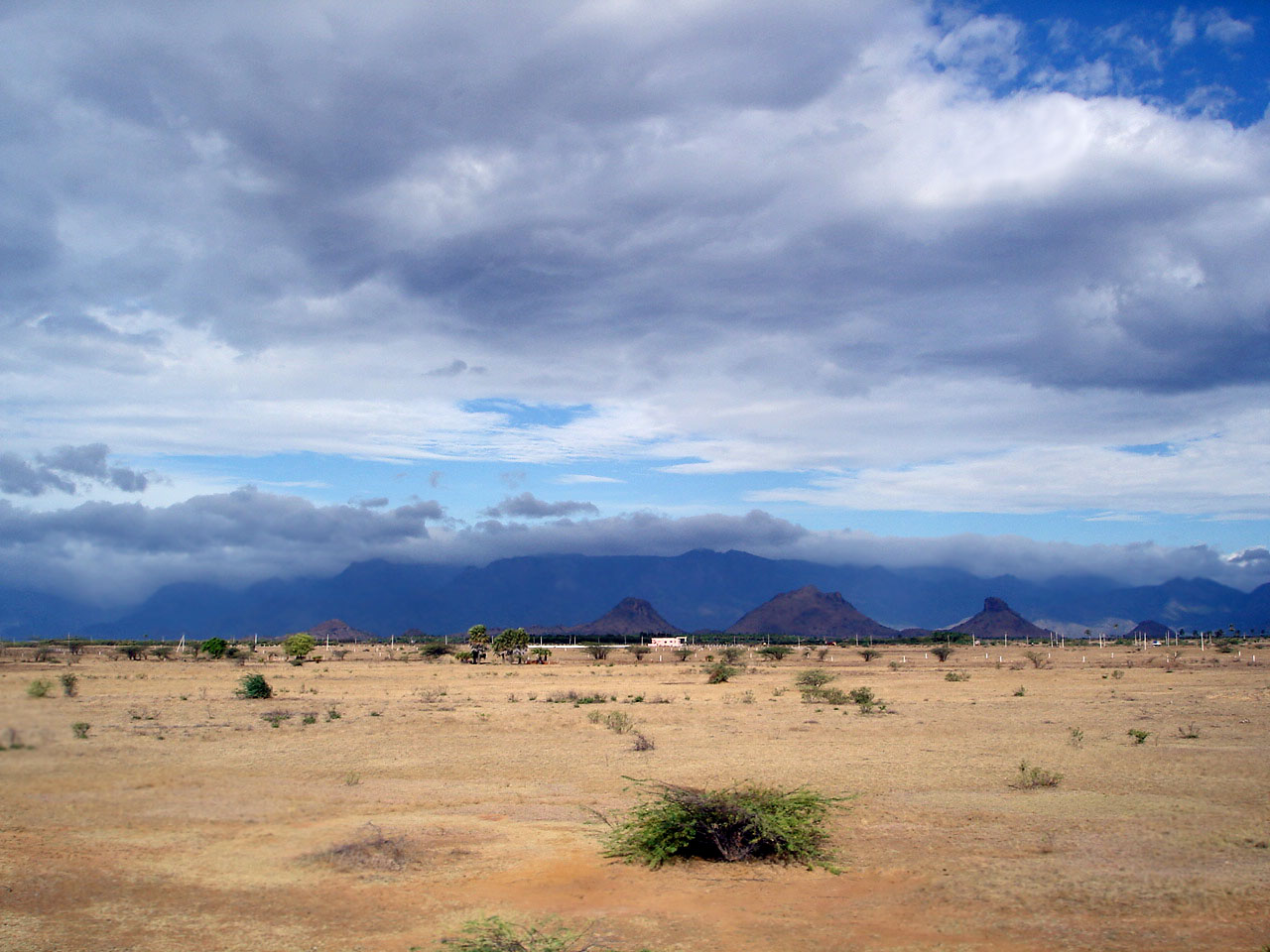
A semi-arid wasteland near Tirunelveli, Tamil Nadu. Monsoon clouds dump torrents of rain on lush forests only kilometres away in windward-facing Kerala. The Agasthyamalai Range mostly stops them from reaching Tirunelveli.

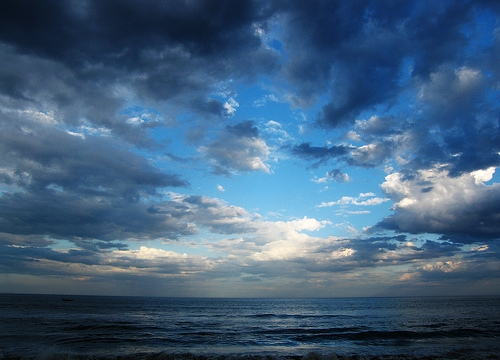
Late-season monsoonal sunset, Coromandel Coast

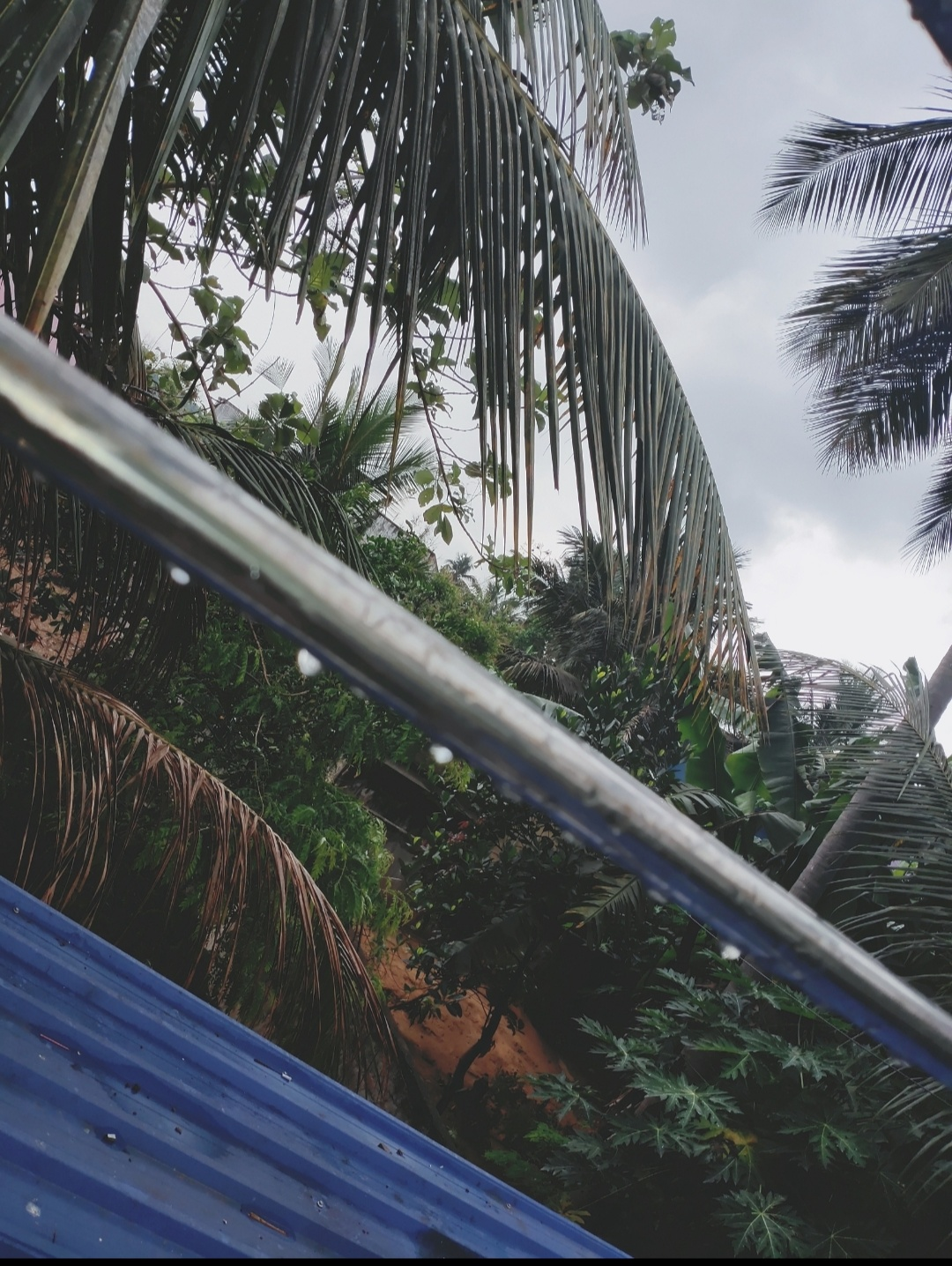
Chill climate view of tamilnadu from a house

The Climate of Tamil Nadu, India is generally tropical and features fairly hot temperatures over the year except during the monsoon seasons. The city of Chennai lies on the thermal equator, which means Chennai and Tamil Nadu does not have that much temperature variation.

== History ==
Under the Köppen climate classification the greater part of Tamil Nadu fills under Tropical savanna climate and smaller portions of the state fall under Humid subtropical climate; the climate of the state ranges from dry sub-humid to semi-arid.

== Seasons ==
=== Summer ===
The summer in Tamil Nadu runs throughout March, April and May and is characterized by intense heat and scant rainfall across the state.

=== Monsoon ===
The state has three distinct periods of rainfall: advanced rainfall; rainfall from the tropical cyclones emerging in the neighbourhood of the Andaman Islands during the Retreat of Monsoons(October–November): and the North-East monsoon during the months of October–December, with dominant northeast monsoon winds from the western disturbances emerging over the Bay of Bengal. The dry season is from February to early June. Mid-June to December is the monsoon months.

Since the state is entirely dependent on rains for recharging its water resources, monsoon failures lead to acute water scarcity and severe droughts.

Tamil Nadu is classified into seven agro-climatic zones: north-east, north-west, west, southern, high rainfall, high altitude hilly, and Cauvery Delta (the most fertile agricultural zone).

== Statistics ==
=== Temperature ===
Average temperatures in various cities of Tamil Nadu (°C)
—
Winter
(Jan

– Feb)

Summer
(Mar – May)
Monsoon
(Jun – Sep)
Post-monsoon
(Oct – Dec)
Year-round
City
Jan
Feb
Mar
Apr
May
Jun
Jul
Aug
Sep
Oct
Nov
Dec
Avg
Chennai
24
25
27
29
31
30
30
28
27
26
25
24
31
Coimbatore
25
26
28
29
29
27
25
26
25
24
23
24
29
Madurai
25
27
29
31
32
30
29
28
27
25
24
25
32
Tiruchirapalli
25
26
28
29
31
32
30
29
29
27
25
24
32

=== Precipitation ===
Average precipitation in various cities of Tamil Nadu (mm)
—	Winter (Jan – Feb)		Summer (Mar – May)			Monsoon 1 (Jun – Sep)				Monsoon 2 (Oct – Dec)			Year-round
City	Jan	Feb	Mar	Apr	May	Jun	Jul	Aug	Sep	Oct	Nov	Dec	Total
Chennai
Coimbatore
Madurai
Tiruchirappalli

=== Weatherboxes ===
Climate data for Chennai (Köppen As/Aw)
Month	Jan	Feb	Mar	Apr	May	Jun	Jul	Aug	Sep	Oct	Nov	Dec	Year
Record high °C (°F)	34.4 (93.9)	36.7 (98.1)	40.6 (105.1)	42.8 (109.0)	45.0 (113.0)	43.3 (109.9)	41.1 (106.0)	40.0 (104.0)	38.9 (102.0)	39.4 (102.9)	35.4 (95.7)	33.0 (91.4)	45.0 (113.0)
Mean daily maximum °C (°F)	29.3 (84.7)	30.9 (87.6)	32.9 (91.2)	34.5 (94.1)	37.1 (98.8)	37.0 (98.6)	35.3 (95.5)	34.7 (94.5)	34.2 (93.6)	32.1 (89.8)	29.9 (85.8)	28.9 (84.0)	33.1 (91.6)
Daily mean °C (°F)	25.4 (77.7)	26.7 (80.1)	28.7 (83.7)	31.0 (87.8)	33.0 (91.4)	32.3 (90.1)	31.0 (87.8)	30.3 (86.5)	29.8 (85.6)	28.5 (83.3)	26.7 (80.1)	25.6 (78.1)	29.1 (84.4)
Mean daily minimum °C (°F)	21.2 (70.2)	22.2 (72.0)	24.2 (75.6)	26.6 (79.9)	28.0 (82.4)	27.5 (81.5)	26.4 (79.5)	25.9 (78.6)	25.6 (78.1)	24.6 (76.3)	23.1 (73.6)	21.9 (71.4)	24.8 (76.6)
Record low °C (°F)	13.9 (57.0)	15.0 (59.0)	16.7 (62.1)	20.0 (68.0)	21.1 (70.0)	20.6 (69.1)	21.0 (69.8)	20.5 (68.9)	20.6 (69.1)	16.7 (62.1)	15.0 (59.0)	13.9 (57.0)	13.9 (57.0)
Average rainfall mm (inches)	20.0 (0.79)	4.7 (0.19)	3.4 (0.13)	17.5 (0.69)	49.7 (1.96)	75.4 (2.97)	113.1 (4.45)	141.4 (5.57)	143.9 (5.67)	278.3 (10.96)	377.3 (14.85)	183.7 (7.23)	1,408.4 (55.45)
Average rainy days	1.4	0.6	0.2	1.0	1.8	4.5	6.7	8.8	7.4	10.6	11.5	5.7	60.2
Average relative humidity (%) (at 17:30 IST)	67	66	67	70	68	63	65	66	71	76	76	71	69
Mean monthly sunshine hours	232.5	240.1	291.4	294.0	300.7	234.0	142.6	189.1	195.0	257.3	261.0	210.8	2,848.5
Mean daily sunshine hours	7.5	8.5	9.4	9.8	9.7	7.8	4.6	6.1	6.5	8.3	8.7	6.8	7.8
Average ultraviolet index	7	7	7	8	8	8	8	7	7	6	7	7	7
Source 1: Indian Meteorological Department
Source 2: Japan Meteorological Agency Weather Atlas Time and Date (dewpoints, 2005-2015)

Climate data for Coimbatore (Köppen BSh)
Month	Jan	Feb	Mar	Apr	May	Jun	Jul	Aug	Sep	Oct	Nov	Dec	Year
Record high °C (°F)	35.9 (96.6)	38.8 (101.8)	40.8 (105.4)	42.6 (108.7)	41.2 (106.2)	38.0 (100.4)	36.2 (97.2)	36.0 (96.8)	37.8 (100.0)	36.8 (98.2)	34.2 (93.6)	34.4 (93.9)	42.6 (108.7)
Mean daily maximum °C (°F)	30.8 (87.4)	33.6 (92.5)	36.0 (96.8)	36.7 (98.1)	35.4 (95.7)	32.4 (90.3)	31.6 (88.9)	31.9 (89.4)	32.7 (90.9)	31.9 (89.4)	30.1 (86.2)	29.6 (85.3)	32.7 (90.9)
Mean daily minimum °C (°F)	18.8 (65.8)	19.8 (67.6)	21.8 (71.2)	23.7 (74.7)	23.7 (74.7)	22.6 (72.7)	22.0 (71.6)	22.0 (71.6)	22.1 (71.8)	22.0 (71.6)	20.9 (69.6)	19.0 (66.2)	21.5 (70.7)
Record low °C (°F)	12.2 (54.0)	12.8 (55.0)	15.8 (60.4)	18.2 (64.8)	15.6 (60.1)	18.3 (64.9)	16.1 (61.0)	16.1 (61.0)	16.7 (62.1)	15.9 (60.6)	14.1 (57.4)	12.4 (54.3)	12.2 (54.0)
Average rainfall mm (inches)	7.5 (0.30)	4.2 (0.17)	25.7 (1.01)	43.6 (1.72)	55.2 (2.17)	23.7 (0.93)	25.3 (1.00)	36.1 (1.42)	52.8 (2.08)	157.5 (6.20)	134.6 (5.30)	33.3 (1.31)	599.5 (23.61)
Average rainy days	0.4	0.6	1.3	2.9	3.5	2.7	2.9	2.8	3.5	8.2	6.6	2.2	37.6
Average relative humidity (%) (at 17:30 IST)	41	33	31	42	56	66	68	68	66	67	64	53	54
Source: India Meteorological Department

Climate data for Madurai (Köppen Aw/As/BSh)
Month	Jan	Feb	Mar	Apr	May	Jun	Jul	Aug	Sep	Oct	Nov	Dec	Year
Record high °C (°F)	39.1 (102.4)	38.5 (101.3)	41.7 (107.1)	42.1 (107.8)	44.5 (112.1)	42.2 (108.0)	40.6 (105.1)	40.0 (104.0)	39.8 (103.6)	40.0 (104.0)	38.0 (100.4)	37.0 (98.6)	44.5 (112.1)
Mean daily maximum °C (°F)	30.8 (87.4)	33.3 (91.9)	36.0 (96.8)	37.2 (99.0)	37.9 (100.2)	37.2 (99.0)	36.5 (97.7)	36.2 (97.2)	35.1 (95.2)	33.1 (91.6)	30.6 (87.1)	30.0 (86.0)	34.5 (94.1)
Mean daily minimum °C (°F)	19.6 (67.3)	21.5 (70.7)	23.4 (74.1)	25.6 (78.1)	26.3 (79.3)	26.2 (79.2)	25.9 (78.6)	25.5 (77.9)	24.6 (76.3)	23.7 (74.7)	22.7 (72.9)	21.3 (70.3)	23.9 (75.0)
Record low °C (°F)	15.6 (60.1)	10.5 (50.9)	16.9 (62.4)	19.4 (66.9)	17.8 (64.0)	17.8 (64.0)	19.4 (66.9)	20.6 (69.1)	18.5 (65.3)	18.9 (66.0)	17.2 (63.0)	16.7 (62.1)	10.5 (50.9)
Average precipitation mm (inches)	8.5 (0.33)	11.0 (0.43)	18.3 (0.72)	60.1 (2.37)	80.6 (3.17)	34.3 (1.35)	56.9 (2.24)	93.9 (3.70)	121.5 (4.78)	185.8 (7.31)	147.2 (5.80)	51.3 (2.02)	869.4 (34.23)
Average precipitation days	0.8	1.1	1.2	3.3	4.0	2.2	2.9	4.6	6.6	9.7	6.8	3.4	46.6
Average relative humidity (%)	77	77	76	72	70	68	70	71	71	76	78	78	74
Average ultraviolet index	7	7	8	8	8	8	8	8	7	7	6	6	7
Source 1: Indian Meteorological Department Mean data from 1981–2010
Source 2: Weather Atlas

Climate data for Tiruchirappalli (Köppen Aw/As)
Month	Jan	Feb	Mar	Apr	May	Jun	Jul	Aug	Sep	Oct	Nov	Dec	Year
Record high °C (°F)	35.6 (96.1)	40.0 (104.0)	42.2 (108.0)	42.8 (109.0)	43.3 (109.9)	43.9 (111.0)	41.1 (106.0)	40.6 (105.1)	40.6 (105.1)	38.9 (102.0)	36.7 (98.1)	35.6 (96.1)	43.9 (111.0)
Mean daily maximum °C (°F)	30.3 (86.5)	32.8 (91.0)	35.7 (96.3)	37.5 (99.5)	38.2 (100.8)	37.1 (98.8)	36.3 (97.3)	35.8 (96.4)	35.0 (95.0)	32.8 (91.0)	30.4 (86.7)	29.6 (85.3)	34.3 (93.7)
Mean daily minimum °C (°F)	20.6 (69.1)	21.5 (70.7)	23.5 (74.3)	26.1 (79.0)	26.8 (80.2)	26.6 (79.9)	26.1 (79.0)	25.7 (78.3)	24.9 (76.8)	24.2 (75.6)	22.8 (73.0)	21.2 (70.2)	24.2 (75.6)
Record low °C (°F)	14.4 (57.9)	13.9 (57.0)	15.6 (60.1)	18.3 (64.9)	19.4 (66.9)	18.0 (64.4)	20.1 (68.2)	20.6 (69.1)	20.6 (69.1)	18.9 (66.0)	16.7 (62.1)	14.4 (57.9)	13.9 (57.0)
Average rainfall mm (inches)	13.3 (0.52)	3.6 (0.14)	5.3 (0.21)	29.6 (1.17)	67.0 (2.64)	38.3 (1.51)	60.5 (2.38)	69.9 (2.75)	153.4 (6.04)	153.9 (6.06)	168.0 (6.61)	81.4 (3.20)	844.2 (33.24)
Average rainy days	0.9	0.4	0.6	1.7	3.8	2.6	2.7	4.1	7.1	9.2	8.1	5.1	46.3
Average relative humidity (%) (at 17:30 IST)	54	43	37	41	42	44	45	46	52	64	70	65	50
Source: India Meteorological Department

== Desert Soil ==
Mostly, desert soils are seen around Madurai, Virudhunagar, Sivaganga, Ramanathapuram and some parts of Tirunelveli dist, a few adjoining districts. These districts are formally known as the desert districts of Tamil Nadu.

== Disasters ==
=== Floods ===
During the 2015 South Indian floods (most affected districts: Chennai, Kanchipuram and Cuddalore), Chennai received 1,049 mm (41.3 in) of rainfall in November, the highest recorded since November 1918 when 1,088 mm (42.8 in) of rainfall was recorded.[24][25] The flooding in Chennai was described as the worst in a century.[26]

=== Cyclones ===
List of Cyclones Hits Tamil Nadu
Year	Cyclone	Formed	Origin	Highest winds	Fatalities	Missing	Damages	Sources
2010	Laila	17 May - 21 May	1400 km (865 mi) south of Kolkata in the Bay of Bengal	120 km/h	65		$117 million (2010 USD)	
2010	Jal	01 Nov - 12 Nov	550km (340mi), to the southeast of Ho Chi Minh City, Vietnam	110 km/h	118	12	$1.73 billion (2010 USD)	
2011	Thane	25 Dec - 31 Dec	1540km (960mi) to the east of Medan in Indonesia	140 km/h	48	-	$235 million (2011 USD)	
2012	Nilam	28 Oct - 01 Nov	550 km (340 mi) to the northeast of Trincomalee, Sri Lanka	95 km/h	75		$56.7 million (2012 USD)	
2016	Nadah	29 Nov – 2 Dec	extreme southeastern region of the Bay of Bengal	75 km/h	12			
2016	Vardah	6 Dec - 13 Dec	near the Malay Peninsula and the south Andaman Sea	130 km/h	47		$3.38 billion (2016 USD)	
2017	Ockhi	29 Nov - 6 Dec	425 km (265 mi) to the south-southeast of Colombo, Sri Lanka	155 km/h	318	141	$920 million (2017 USD)	
2018	Gaja	10 Nov - 22 Nov	near Gulf of Thailand	130 km/h	52		$775 million (2018 USD)	
2020	Nivar	23 Nov - 27 Nov	South of the Bay of Bengal	130 km/h	14		$600 million (2020 USD)	
2020	Burevi	30 Nov - 5 Dec	Off the coast of Aceh	85 km/h	11	6		
2022	Mandous	6 Dec - 10 Dec	South east of the Andaman Sea	100 km/h	9		$27.4 million (2022 USD)	
2023	Michaung	1 Dec - 6 Dec	South to the Andaman Sea	120 km/h	17		$1.32 billion (2023 USD)	
2024	Fengal	25 Nov - 4 Dec	Tropical low west of Sumatra, Indonesia	110 km/h	37 (20 in India, 17 in Sri Lanka)	50	$55 million (2024 USD)	
2025	Ditwah	26 Nov - 4 Dec	Offshore to the southeastern coast of Sri Lanka	75 km/h	647	183	$1.64 billion (2025 USD)	

== Pollution ==
The air quality of industrial areas in Ennore, as well as in Poes Garden and Boat Club are above the standards prescribed by the environment ministry, according to a report by Coastal Resource Centre.

The centre took eleven air samples in and around North Chennai and Chennai city as part of their air quality study in Ennore 2016. 24-hour samples were taken using filters fitted to a low volume air sampler and analysed for PM 2.5 (Particulate Matter or dust less than 2.5 micrometres in size). The key documented sources of PM 2.5 pollution are automobile exhaust, burning of coal, burning garbage and landfill, smelting processing of metals.

Surprisingly, 10 out of the 11 air samples were between 1.4 and 3.7 times higher than prescribed by the Ministry of Environment, Forests and Climate Change. The quality of air in Nallathaneer Odai Kuppam in Ennore is the highest with 220 micrograms of particulate matter per cubic meter of air.

Other areas from Ennore include Manali with 156 ug/m3, Sivanpadaiveethi Kuppam with 156. 90 ug/m3 and Kodingayur with 154.90 ug/m3 which is all considered very unhealthy according to the US Environment Protection Agency.

The Ennore region has 3300 MW of installed coal power plant capacity, with more than 1500 acres as dedicated coal ash dumps, says the report.

Highlighting the health effects of bad air quality, Dr Hissamudin Papa, Founder and Director, HUMA Hospitals said, "We visited these areas in Ennore and found various health issues. Children who are 14 to 15 years old look like they are 8 years old. Women have hormonal issues and infertility. Many people have chronic obstructive pulmonary disease in these areas. The pollution needs to be reduced in these areas.

Even areas like Poes Garden and Boat Club ranged 104 and 101 UG/ M3 which is considered unhealthy according to US EPA standards. "The high concentration of polluting industries in the city’s northern and southern edges is affecting all of Chennai," said Dr Rakhal Gaitonde, a public health specialist.

According to the report by the Coastal Resource Centre, the level of manganese in eight of the eleven samples exceed the US EPA reference concentration for exposure to manganese. There are no standards in India for manganese in ambient air. Also, the levels of calcium silicon and crystalline silica, which are enriched in coal ash were found in the air samples.

"Manganese and nickel are well-known toxins and their effects are well-documented. Manganese is predominantly a neurotoxin, while nickel is a carcinogen. The measurement of such toxic substances from the rooftops of human settlements is indeed a cause of concern," added Dr Rakhal.

The Coastal Resource Centre wants the Tamil Nadu government to take immediate action to improve the air quality in Ennore. "The government needs to impose a moratorium on all industrial activities till the environment is restored, initiate long-term and continuous monitoring in Ennore region," said Nityanand Jayaraman, an environment activist.

He added, "No norms are followed by the Tamil Nadu Pollution Control Board. Why should people living in North Chennai have to bear all the harmful effects of the industries?"

The Coastal Resource Centre also wants the government to apprehend polluters and take corrective actions to bring the levels of dust and heavy metals in the dust below detection limits in residential areas.

== See also ==
- Climate of India
- Climatic regions of India
