= D. Amaramoorthy =

Indian politician

D. Amaramoorthy is an Indian politician and incumbent Member of the Legislative Assembly of Tamil Nadu. He was elected to the Tamil Nadu legislative assembly from Ariyalur constituency as a Tamil Maanila Congress candidate in 1996 election, and as an Indian National Congress candidate in 2006 election.

== Electoral performance ==
Election	Constituency	Political party	Result	Vote %	Opposition			Ref
Election	Constituency	Political party	Result	Vote %	Candidate	Political party	Vote %	Ref
1996	Ariyalur	TMC(M)	Won	53.19%	A. Elavarasan	AIADMK	31.89%	
2006	Ariyalur	INC	Won	45.36%	M. Ravichandran	AIADMK	42.20%	
2011	Ariyalur	INC	Lost	38.17%	Durai. Manivel	AIADMK	47.77%	
