= Schools of Equality =

Indian non-profit organization

- Website type: Nonprofit organization
- Founded: 2014; 12 years ago
- Headquarters: Chennai, Tamil Nadu, India
- Key people: Gulika Reddy (founder)
- Industry: Education
- Website: schoolsofequality.org

Schools of Equality is a nonprofit organization aimed to shift social attitudes of youth surrounding gender-based violence and other injustices. They work with youth and students in various cities and villages in south India. The organization was founded by Gulika Reddy, a human rights lawyer practicing in the High Court of Madras, in 2014.

== Programmes ==
Their programmes are designed to encourage students to question notions of power related to gender and its intersectionalities, including caste, class, religion and sexuality. They also help understand the right of choice and to respect each other's rights.

They helped children understand and deal with bullying and the students of Sishya, Adyar in Chennai came up with a ‘school constitution’ that includes the right to be protected from bullying. The team at Schools of Equality works with students to help them come to terms with different issues, whether it is their own identity or gender equality. The students are taught to recognise their rights and the responsibilities that come with it.

As of June 2015, School of Equality has partnered with the Corporation of Chennai and District Education Officer in Kadapa district, Andhra Pradesh. They also teamed up with private schools as well as village schools. They started with 165 students in Chennai in June and as of 2016 they are working with over 1441 students across the city, in private and government schools, addressing a range of topics pertaining to gender violence.

They have worked with students of class XI and XII and looking to introduce the awareness programme for lower classes as well.

== Workshops ==
Schools of Equality also conducted a workshop in partnership with Stop Street Harassment from Virginia, US, that calls out to people to share their experiences and raise their voice against street harassment.
