= Ariyalur division =

Revenue division of Tamil Nadu, India

Coordinates: 11°8′14″N 79°4′40″E

Ariyalur division is a revenue division in the Ariyalur district of Tamil Nadu, India.
