= Droogs (rocks) =

Droogs are steep rocks which dot the surface of Mysore and Tamil Nadu, India.

The rocks are prominent monoliths and may resemble haystacks, some of which are 1,500 ft (460 m) high, and some of which have springs on the top. They provide formidable sites for fortification because most are scalable only by steps cut in them. There is a famous droog at Tiruchiripalli in Tamil Nadu, also known as the Rock Fort. This is climbed by 434 steps cut into the rock face. Temples to Ganesha and Shiva have been built there. In the 19th century, droogs were used by Superintendent of the Geological Survey of India Colonel William Lambton as sites for his theodolite. The survey, commissioned by the East India Company and completed by Sir George Everest, laid the foundation for the extensive Indian railway system.

John Hatchard wrote in 2010:

If the Madurai skyline was dominated by the huge Gopuram towers of the Meenakshi temple, Trichy’s was dominated by a spectacular granite outcrop crowned by a fort and a temple. The view from the top had to be spectacular so it was a place to visit. We had passed similar upstanding natural features on the way here, huge granite monoliths, smooth and rounded like an elephant's back and spectacularly water-stained. These outcrops, found all over southern India, were called droogs. In most places they provided easily defended sites where local chieftains could base themselves. Here in Trichy it was presumably the same story.

These droogs proved of great use when, in the early 19th century, Colonel William Lambton became Superintendent of the Great Trigonometrical Survey of India. From a base line at St. Thomas Mount, Madras he worked inland and then took the survey south from Bangalore toward Cape Cormorin. He used both droogs and temple gopurams as high points on which to place the great 450-kilogram theodolite used to measure his angles. This survey, commissioned by the English East India Company, gave it an accurate account of the lands it now controlled and was the most remarkable exercise of its kind ever undertaken anywhere. There is a story that while attempting to establish the theodolite on a certain droog, Lambton ran into trouble with a local Muslim chief who believed he was really intent on spying on his harem.
