= K. Chinnappa =

Indian politician

Member of the Tamil Nadu Legislative Assembly
- In office 2 May 2021 – 4 May 2026
- Preceded by: S. Rajendran
- Succeeded by: S. Rajendran
- Constituency: Ariyalur

Personal details
- Party: Marumalarchi Dravida Munnetra Kazhagam

K. Chinnappa is an Indian politician who is a Member of Legislative Assembly of Tamil Nadu. He was elected from Ariyalur as a Dravida Munnetra Kazhagam candidate in 2021.

== Electoral performance ==
Election	Constituency	Political party	Result	Vote %	Opposition			Ref
Election	Constituency	Political party	Result	Vote %	Candidate	Political party	Vote %	Ref
1991	Ariyalur	DMK	Lost	36.62%	S. Manimegalai	AIADMK	57.00%	
1996	Ariyalur	MDMK	Lost	10.41%	D. Amaramoorthy	TMC(M)	53.19%	
2001	Ariyalur	MDMK	Lost	7.88%	P. Elavazhagan	AIADMK	41.03%	
2021	Ariyalur	DMK	Won	46.45%	Thamarai S. Rajendran	AIADMK	45.01%	-
