= Ariyalur =

- Town
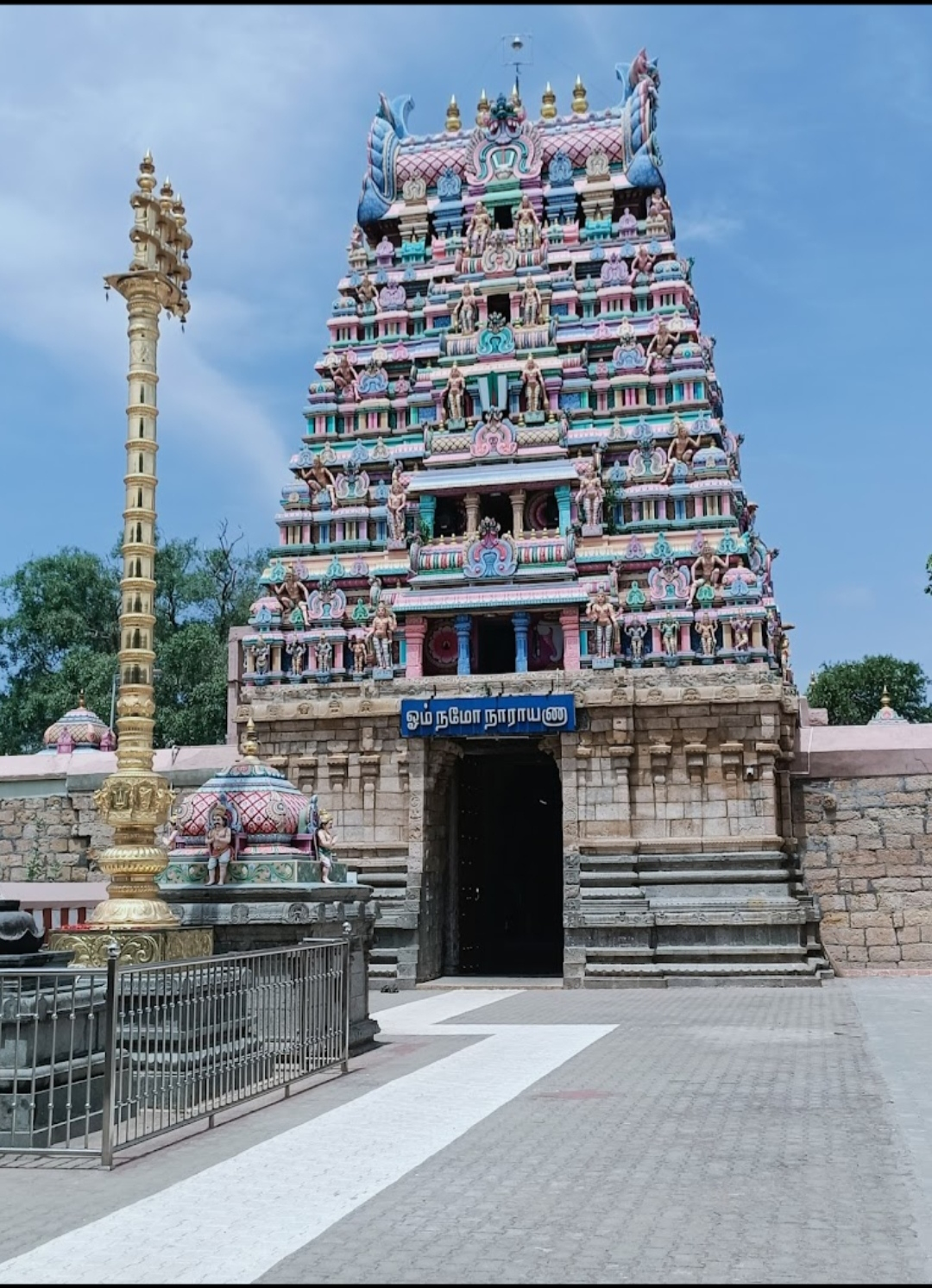
- Sri Kothandaramaswamy perumal Temple is one of the famous temples of the town.
- Nickname: Cement City
- Location in Tamil Nadu Location in India
- Coordinates: 11°8′14″N 79°4′40″E
- Country: India
- State: Tamil Nadu
- District: Ariyalur
- Region: Chola Nadu

Government
  - Type: Second Grade Municipality
  - Body: Ariyalur Municipality
- Elevation: 76 m (249 ft)

Population (2011)
  - Total: 47,922

Languages
  - Official: Tamil
- Time zone: UTC+5:30 (IST)
- PIN: 621704,621713
- Telephone code: 91-4329
- Vehicle registration: TN 61
- Distance from Chennai: 267 kilometres (166 mi)
- Distance from Trichy: 65 kilometres (40 mi)
- Distance from Thanjavur: 42 kilometres (26 mi)
- Precipitation: 620 millimetres (24 in)

Ariyalur (Tamil: [aɾijaluːɾ]) is a town and district headquarters of Ariyalur district in the South Indian state of Tamil Nadu and is rich in limestone, surrounded with seven cement factories and two sugar factories. The town is located at a distance of 310 km (190 mi) from the state capital Chennai.

Ariyalur was a part of the erstwhile Trichinopoly District until India's independence in 1947 and Tiruchirappalli district until 1995, Perambalur district until 2007 and subsequently a part of the newly formed Ariyalur district. The town is a part of the fertile Cauvery Delta and the major profession in the town is agriculture.

Ariyalur is administered by a municipality established in 1994. As of 2011, the municipality covered an area of 7.62 km^{2} (2.94 mi^{2}) and had a population of 28,902. Ariyalur comes under the Ariyalur assembly constituency which elects a member to the Tamil Nadu Legislative Assembly once every five years and it is a part of the Chidambaram constituency which elects its Member of Parliament (MP) once in five years. Roadways are the major mode of transportation to the town and it also has rail connectivity which acts as a main station after Tiruchirappalli junction. The nearest seaport is Karaikal port, located 95 km (59 mi) away, while the nearest airport is the Tiruchirappalli International Airport, located 76 km (47 mi) away from the town.

== History ==
Ariyalur town has a rich historical legacy, primarily associated with the later phases of the Chola dynasty. During the Chola period, the region was governed by the Paluvettaraiyar chiefs, who served as feudatories under Chola kings from Aditya I to Rajendra I. Their capital was Melapaluvur, located near present-day Ariyalur. This area was known for its administrative importance and proximity to Gangaikonda Cholapuram, the imperial capital established by Rajendra Chola I.

Following the decline of the Cholas, Ariyalur came under the rule of the Vijayanagara Empire and later the Nayaks of Madurai. The Vijayanagara Nayak rulers contributed to the construction of several temples in and around the town, most notably the Kothandaramar Temple, which reflects the architectural style of the period.

In the mid-eighteenth century, Ariyalur was one of the two important palayams (feudal estates) under the control of local Poligars. In 1741, when the Marathas invaded Tiruchirappalli, Chanda Sahib was captured. After his release in 1748, he became embroiled in a power struggle with Anwaruddin Khan and his son Muhammad Ali Khan Wallajah for control of the Carnatic region. During this conflict, the Nawab of Arcot accused the Poligars of Ariyalur and Udayarpalayam of defaulting on tribute payments and disloyalty. With British support, forces under Umdat-ul-Umara and Donald Campbell invaded Ariyalur in January 1765 and captured the town. The Poligar of Ariyalur fled to Tharangambadi, then a Danish settlement, marking the end of local autonomy in the area.

After the fall of the Poligars, Ariyalur came under the administrative control of the Nawab of Arcot, and subsequently the British East India Company following the defeat of Tipu Sultan in 1799. By 1801, the Tiruchirappalli district was reorganized under British administration, and Ariyalur was incorporated into it as a prominent regional centre.

During the British period, Ariyalur developed as a local administrative hub and a centre for limestone quarrying, which later evolved into the cement industry that continues to define the town’s economy today. Post-independence, Ariyalur became the headquarters of the newly formed Ariyalur district in 2001. The town has since grown as an industrial, educational, and archaeological centre, located close to the UNESCO World Heritage candidate site of Gangaikonda Cholapuram.

== Geography ==
Ariyalur is located in the central part of Tamil Nadu, India, at a latitude of 11.14°N and a longitude of 79.08°E. The town lies on the plains of the Kaveri River delta, although it is not directly situated on the river. It has an average elevation of 90 meters (295 feet) above sea level, with relatively flat terrain interspersed with small hillocks.

The region experiences a tropical climate, characterized by hot summers from March to June, a southwest monsoon from June to September, and a northeast monsoon from October to December. Average annual rainfall is around 800–1,000 mm, supporting both agriculture and groundwater recharge. The climate is generally dry outside the monsoon periods, and temperatures can rise above 40 °C in peak summer.

Ariyalur is rich in mineral resources, particularly limestone, which has significantly influenced its topography and economy. The sedimentary rock formations in the area date back to the Cretaceous period, and extensive fossil deposits have been discovered in and around the town. These geological features have made Ariyalur an important site for paleontological studies, contributing to its recognition as a fossil-bearing region.

The town is well-connected by road and rail, with National Highway NH-136 passing nearby and the Ariyalur railway station serving as part of the Chennai–Tiruchirappalli line. Its central location in Tamil Nadu allows easy access to neighboring districts such as Thanjavur, Tiruchirappalli, Cuddalore, Perambalur, Tiruvarur and Nagapattinam.

=== Climate ===
Ariyalur has a hot semi-arid climate (Köppen BSh). Temperatures are hot to sweltering throughout the year, and especially unpleasant during the wet season under the northeast monsoon from October to December. The rain shadow of the Western Ghats means that Ariyalur receives very limited rainfall during the southwest monsoon, but the city is likewise too far inland to receive sufficient northeast monsoon rainfall to be a tropical wet and dry climate.

Climate data for Ariyalur, Tamil Nadu (1991-2020 normals, extremes 1979-2020)
Month	Jan	Feb	Mar	Apr	May	Jun	Jul	Aug	Sep	Oct	Nov	Dec	Year
Record high °C (°F)	42.0 (107.6)	42.4 (108.3)	42.4 (108.3)	45.4 (113.7)	48.4 (119.1)	42.0 (107.6)	41.5 (106.7)	49.6 (121.3)	44.4 (111.9)	42.2 (108.0)	42.2 (108.0)	42.4 (108.3)	49.6 (121.3)
Mean maximum °C (°F)	33.9 (93.0)	35.8 (96.4)	39.0 (102.2)	40.6 (105.1)	40.8 (105.4)	39.5 (103.1)	38.9 (102.0)	39.3 (102.7)	38.9 (102.0)	37.0 (98.6)	35.3 (95.5)	33.8 (92.8)	41.1 (106.0)
Mean daily maximum °C (°F)	31.7 (89.1)	33.6 (92.5)	36.2 (97.2)	38.0 (100.4)	38.7 (101.7)	37.0 (98.6)	35.9 (96.6)	36.4 (97.5)	36.2 (97.2)	34.2 (93.6)	32.0 (89.6)	30.8 (87.4)	35.2 (95.4)
Daily mean °C (°F)	26.6 (79.9)	28.0 (82.4)	30.3 (86.5)	33.0 (91.4)	33.2 (91.8)	32.5 (90.5)	31.7 (89.1)	31.6 (88.9)	31.0 (87.8)	29.3 (84.7)	27.4 (81.3)	26.3 (79.3)	30.3 (86.5)
Mean daily minimum °C (°F)	21.4 (70.5)	22.4 (72.3)	24.3 (75.7)	28.0 (82.4)	27.7 (81.9)	27.9 (82.2)	27.5 (81.5)	26.8 (80.2)	25.8 (78.4)	24.3 (75.7)	22.7 (72.9)	21.7 (71.1)	25.3 (77.5)
Mean minimum °C (°F)	19.9 (67.8)	20.8 (69.4)	21.0 (69.8)	24.6 (76.3)	23.5 (74.3)	25.3 (77.5)	25.2 (77.4)	23.9 (75.0)	23.3 (73.9)	22.2 (72.0)	20.8 (69.4)	20.2 (68.4)	19.6 (67.3)
Record low °C (°F)	15.2 (59.4)	13.0 (55.4)	15.2 (59.4)	20.0 (68.0)	15.6 (60.1)	21.9 (71.4)	19.4 (66.9)	20.6 (69.1)	19.8 (67.6)	18.2 (64.8)	13.0 (55.4)	15.2 (59.4)	13.0 (55.4)
Average rainfall mm (inches)	2.6 (0.10)	0.9 (0.04)	8.6 (0.34)	18.5 (0.73)	51.3 (2.02)	32.4 (1.28)	22.8 (0.90)	88.7 (3.49)	83.5 (3.29)	114.7 (4.52)	190.9 (7.52)	93.2 (3.67)	708.2 (27.88)
Average rainy days (≥ 2.5 mm)	0.4	0.1	0.2	1.0	2.5	1.9	1.4	4.2	4.8	6.7	7.7	4.2	35.3
Average relative humidity (%)	80	72	63	61	61	61	62	66	71	80	85	83	70
Source 1: India Meteorological Department
Source 2: NOAA (humidity)

== Economy ==
Ariyalur's economy is predominantly driven by the cement industry, owing to its rich deposits of limestone and proximity to lignite reserves. The town's industrial landscape is further diversified by agriculture, particularly the cultivation of sugarcane and cashew, and the presence of a private sugar factory near Keelapalur with a crushing capacity of 3,000 tonnes per day.

=== Cement Industry ===
The cement industry in Ariyalur has a storied history, beginning with the establishment of the Tamil Nadu Cements Corporation Limited (TANCEM) in 1976. TANCEM took over the Alangulam Cement Plant from TIDCO and set up an additional plant in Ariyalur in 1979. This move marked the commencement of organized cement production in the region. The Ariyalur Cement Works primarily supplies cement to government departments and has a wide network of stockists for open market sales in the central and northern districts of Tamil Nadu and northern Kerala.

== Administration and politics ==
Municipality Officials
Chairman
Commissioner	K. Sudha
Vice Chairman	M. Malarkodi
Elected Members
Member of Legislative Assembly	K.Chinnappa
Member of Parliament	Thol. Thirumavalavan{current}

The municipality of Ariyalur was established as a second grade town panchayat from 1943 during British rule. It was promoted to a first grade town panchyat in 1995, to a second grade in 1966 and a special grade in October 2004. Jayankondam is the first Municipality in Ariyalur district. During December 2004, it was promoted to a third grade municipality. As of 2008, the municipality covered an area of 7.62 km^{2} (2.94 mi^{2}) and had a total of 18 members. The functions of the municipality is devolved into six departments: General, Engineering, Revenue, Public Health, Town planning and the Computer Wing. All these departments are under the control of a Municipal Commissioner who is the supreme executive head. The legislative powers are vested in a body of 18 members, one each from the 18 wards. The legislative body is headed by an elected Chairperson assisted by a Deputy Chairperson. The municipality had an estimated income of ₹75,917,000 and an estimated expenditure of ₹63,703,000 for the year 2012–13.

Ariyalur comes under the Ariyalur State Assembly Constituency and it elects a member to the Tamil Nadu Legislative Assembly once every five years. The current Member of Legislative Assembly (MLA) of the constituency since 2021 is K. Chinnappa from the DMK Party.

Ariyalur is a part of the Chidambaram Lok Sabha constituency and elects a member to the Lok Sabha, the lower house of the Parliament of India, once every five years. The current Member of Parliament from the constituency is Thol.Thirumavalavan from the DMK party.

== Demographics ==
Religious census
Religion	Percent(%)
Hindu	90.55%
Muslim	4.61%
Christian	3.81%
Sikh	0.02%
Buddhist	0.01%
Jain	0.01%
Other	0.97%
No religion	0.01%

Historical population
Year	Pop.	±%
1971	17,305	—
1981	20,635	+19.2%
1991	26,141	+26.7%
2001	34,822	+33.2%
2011	47,922	+37.6%
1971–2001: 2011:

According to 2011 census, Ariyalur had a population of 47,922 with a sex-ratio of 1,014 females for every 1,000 males, much above the national average of 929. A total of 4,977 were under the age of six years, constituting 2,538 males and 2,439 females. Scheduled Castes and Scheduled Tribes accounted for 11.26% and 0.03% of the population respectively. The average literacy of the town was 76.04%, compared to the national average of 72.99%. The town had a total of 14,319 households. There were a total of 20,283 workers, comprising 1315 cultivators, 1070 main agricultural labourers, 1298 in house hold industries, 16,165 other workers, 1,835 marginal workers, 159 marginal cultivators, 175 marginal agricultural labourers, 150 marginal workers in household industries and 1,351 other marginal workers. As of 2008, there were a total of eight notified slums, with 5,907 comprising 11% of the total population residing in those. As per the religious census of 2011, Ariyalur had 90.55% Hindus, 4.61% Muslims, 3.81% Christians, 0.02% Sikhs, 0.01% Buddhists, 0.01% Jains, 0.97% following other religions and 0.01% following no religion or did not indicate any religious preference.

== Utility services ==
Electricity supply to Ariyalur is regulated and distributed by the Tamil Nadu Electricity Board (TNEB). The town along with its suburbs forms the Trichy Electricity Distribution Circle. Water supply is provided by the municipality of Ariyalur from Kollidam river through three schemes with head works of two of them located at Thirumanur. In the period 2010–2011, a total of 2.3 million litres of water was supplied everyday for households in the town. There are three bore wells and 356 water fountains in the town that serves as the source of groundwater. About 11 metric tonnes of solid waste are collected from Ariyalur every day by door-to-door collection out of the 15 metric tonnes generated and subsequently the source segregation and dumping is carried out by the sanitary department of the municipality. The coverage of solid waste management had an efficiency of 73% as of 2001. There is limited underground drainage system in the town and the major sewerage system for disposal of sullage is through septic tanks, open drains and public conveniences. The municipality maintains a total of 25.16 km (15.63 mi) of storm water drains in Ariyalur, out of which 7.93 km (4.93 mi) are open drains and 17.23 km (10.71 mi) are unpaved drains. There is a government hospital and twelve private hospitals and clinics that take care of the healthcare needs of the citizens. There are a total of 1,501 street lamps in Ariyalur: 361 sodium lamps, 1,139 tube lights and one high mast beam lamp. The municipality operates one fish and meat market that has 46 shops and a weekly market that cater to the needs of the town and the rural areas around it.

== Transportation ==
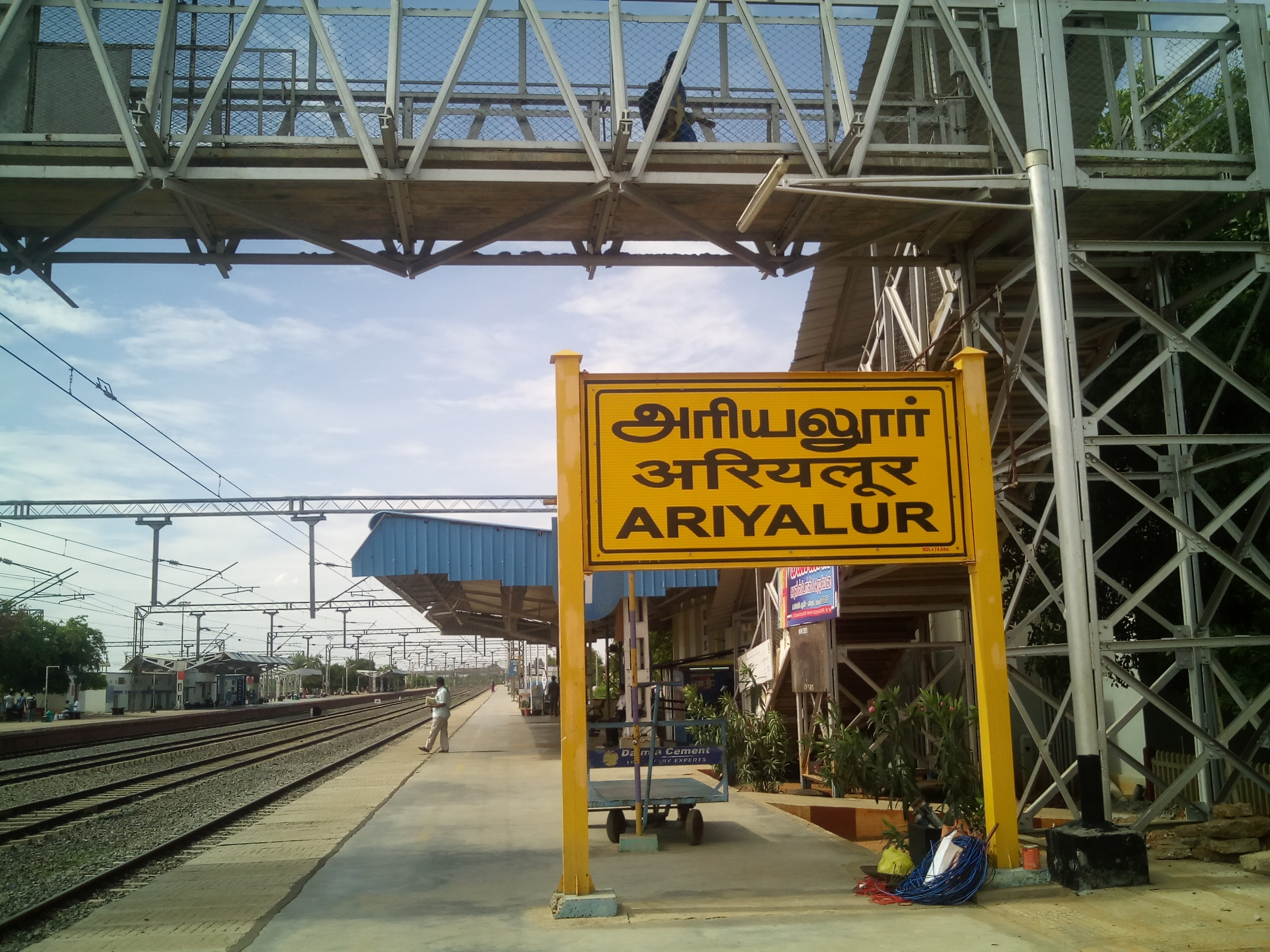
Ariyalur Railway Station

The National Highway NH136 connects Perambalur and Thanjavur, passes through Ariyalur, State Highways SH143 - Ariyalur- Thungapuram - Thittakudi and SH139 Ariyalur - Rettipalayan are the major roads via Ariyalur. The Ariyalur municipality maintains a total length of 29.17 km (18.13 mi). The town has 3.2 km (2.0 mi) concrete roads, 16.2 km (10.1 mi) BT roads, 4 km (2.5 mi) of WBM roads and 5.77 km (3.59 mi) earthen roads. A total of 452 roads is maintained by the State Highways Department. Ariyalur is served by town bus service, which provides connectivity within the town and the suburbs. There are private operated mini-bus services that cater to the local transport needs of the town. The town has a B-class bus stand located in the heart of the town. There are regular inter-city bus services to Ariyalur. The Tamil Nadu State Transport Corporation operates daily services connecting various cities to Ariyalur. The major inter city bus routes from the town are to cities and towns like Trichy, Chidambaram, Jayankondam, Perambalur and Thanjavur. Ariyalur railway station is located on the line between the state capital Chennai and Trichy and is well connected by rail to major towns like Madurai and Tirunelveli. The nearest seaport is Karaikal port, located 95 km (59 mi) away, while the nearest airport is the Tiruchirappalli International Airport, located 76 km (47 mi) away from the town.

Ariyalur railway station is a major railway station on chord line connecting Chennai and Tiruchirappalli. Several daily trains such as Pallavan Express, Rockfort Express, Pearl City Express, Vaigai Express, Guruvayur Express, Tambaram–Mangaluru Central Express, sethu expressetc. connect Ariyalur with Chennai Egmore and Tiruchirappalli Junction.

== See also ==
- Ariyalur Block
- Ariyalur division
- Ariyalur taluk
- 1956 Ariyalur train accident
- Vadaveekam

== Sources ==
- Urban Infrastructure report (2008). Conversion of City Corporate Plan into Business Plan (PDF) (Report). Tamil Nadu Urban Infrastructure Financial Services Limited. Archived from the original (PDF) on 16 September 2012.
