= Kumara Swamy Desikar =

Kumara Swamy desikar

Personal life
- Born: Kumara Swamy; 8 October 1711; Kanchipuram
- Died: 5 December 1810 (aged 99); Kanchipuram

Religious life
- Religion: Hinduism
- Philosophy: Saiva

Kumara Swamy Desikar (born Kumara Swamy, 8 October 1711 – 5 December 1810), was a Saiva spiritual writer. He was born to a Tamil-speaking Desikar family in Kanchipuram, Tamil Nadu. He composed over three books.

== Life ==
Kumara Swamy Desikar was born in a town called Kanchipuram Thondai mandalam in Tamil Nadu, South India, into an orthodox Saiva Tamil (Desikar) family around the 17th century. He was a respectable spiritual leader. Kumara swamy Desikar was the Archaka and Dikshithar for the people of Thondai mandalam. He left his family and went to Thiruvannamalai with his disciples. There he planned to become a sage. But it failed. He married Thangammal.

== Lineage ==
He had three sons and a daughter: Siva Prakasar, Velaiyar, Karunai prakasar, and Gnambikai Ammal.

Siva prakasar a poet was blessed as ‘Sivanuputhichelvar’ by the grace of God, as claimed. He is acclaimed as ‘Karpanai Kalangiyam’ by renowned scholars of Tamil-speaking world. He compiled " Neerotta Yamaha Anthathi " to defeat the arrogant poet. The verses will not make both lips touch. And also written Nanneri, Naalvar Naan Mani Maalai, Yesu Matha Niragaranam. He attained mukthi motcha at 32 age in Nallathur, near Pondicherry.

Kumara Swamy Desikar's daughter Gnambikai married Perur Santhalinga Swamigal.

His second son Karunai Prakasar wrote more than five books in Tamil "Seegalathi sarukkam, Ishtalinga Agaval". He died at Thiruvengai.

Velaiyar wrote more than seven books. Mayilathula, Nallur puranam, Mayilai thirattai mani maalai, Ishta linga kaithala maalai, Kumbakona Sarangathevar history as Veera singhathana puranam, Gugai Namachivaya Desikar history as Namchivaya leelai and Krisnanan history as Paarijatha leelai.

Swaminatha Desikar converted to Christianity in October 1884, changing his name to Susai Alias Swaminatha Desikar.

There were no children for Siva Prakasar, Karunai Prakasar, Gnambikai ammal. Only Velaiyar had a son. Likewise Kumara Swamy Desikar's lineage continues via Susai alias Swaminatha Desikar.
