= 1810 =

1810 in various calendars
- Gregorian calendar: 1810; MDCCCX
- Ab urbe condita: 2563
- Armenian calendar: 1259; ԹՎ ՌՄԾԹ
- Assyrian calendar: 6560
- Balinese saka calendar: 1731–1732
- Bengali calendar: 1216–1217
- Berber calendar: 2760
- British Regnal year: 50 Geo. 3 – 51 Geo. 3
- Buddhist calendar: 2354
- Burmese calendar: 1172
- Byzantine calendar: 7318–7319
- Chinese calendar: 己巳年 (Earth Snake); 4507 or 4300 — to — 庚午年 (Metal Horse); 4508 or 4301
- Coptic calendar: 1526–1527
- Discordian calendar: 2976
- Ethiopian calendar: 1802–1803
- Hebrew calendar: 5570–5571
- Hindu calendars
- Vikram Samvat: 1866–1867
- Shaka Samvat: 1731–1732
- Kali Yuga: 4910–4911
- Holocene calendar: 11810
- Igbo calendar: 810–811
- Iranian calendar: 1188–1189
- Islamic calendar: 1224–1225
- Japanese calendar: Bunka 7 (文化７年)
- Javanese calendar: 1736–1737
- Julian calendar: Gregorian minus 12 days
- Korean calendar: 4143
- Minguo calendar: 102 before ROC 民前102年
- Nanakshahi calendar: 342
- Thai solar calendar: 2352–2353
- Tibetan calendar: ས་མོ་སྦྲུལ་ལོ་ (female Earth-Snake); 1936 or 1555 or 783 — to — ལྕགས་ཕོ་རྟ་ལོ་ (male Iron-Horse); 1937 or 1556 or 784

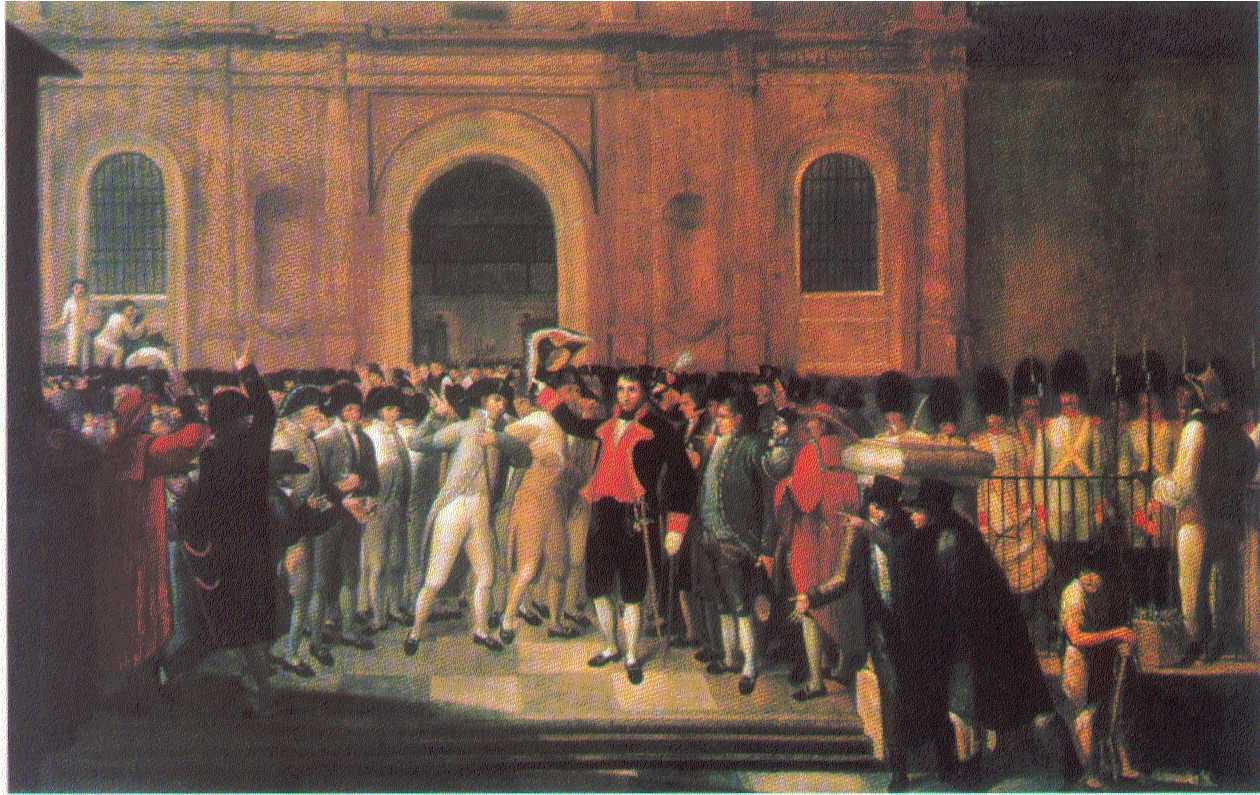
April 19: Venezuela becomes first South American nation to declare independence from Spain.

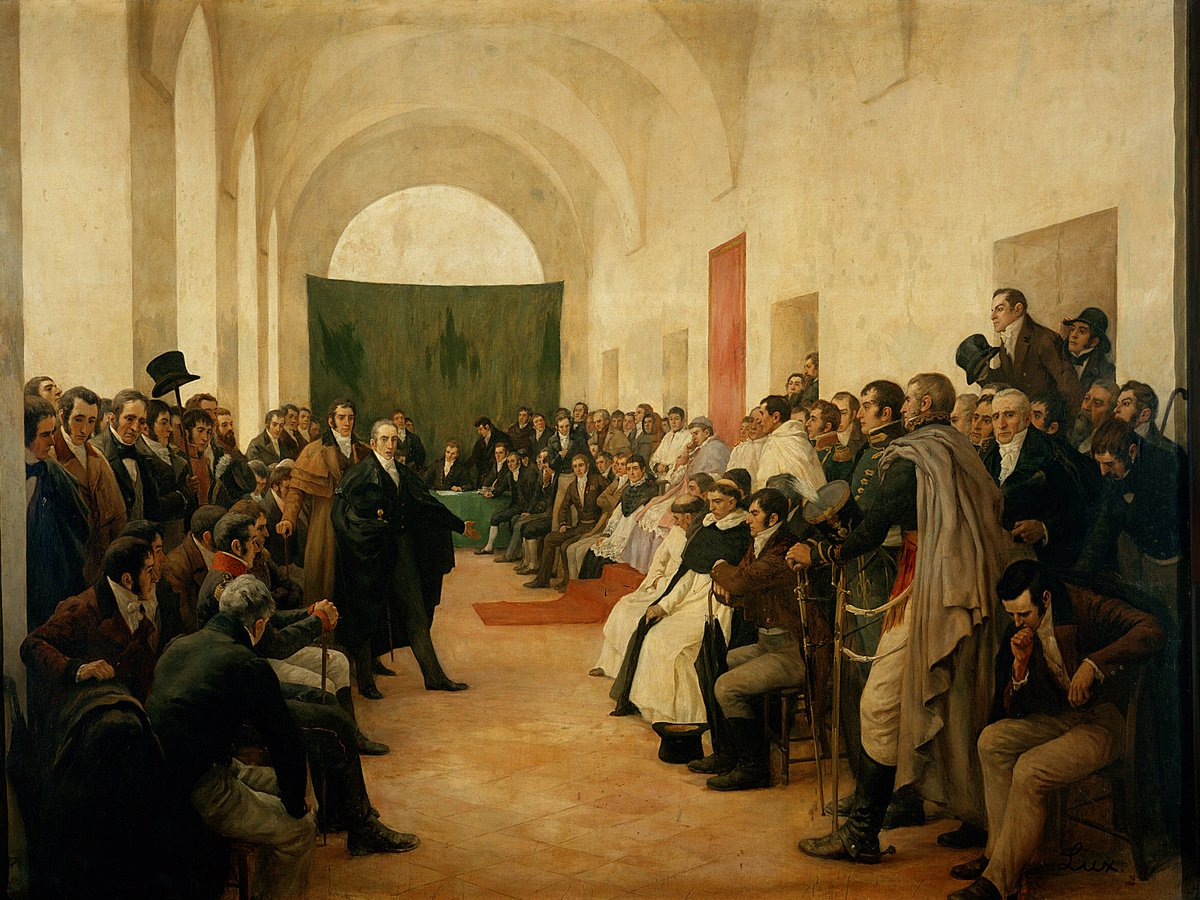
May 22: Argentina declares independence from Spain.

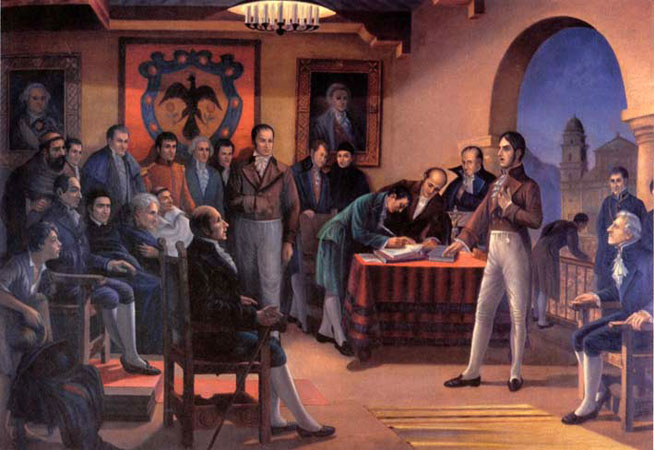
July 20: in Colombia, the United Provinces of New Granada declare independence from Spain.

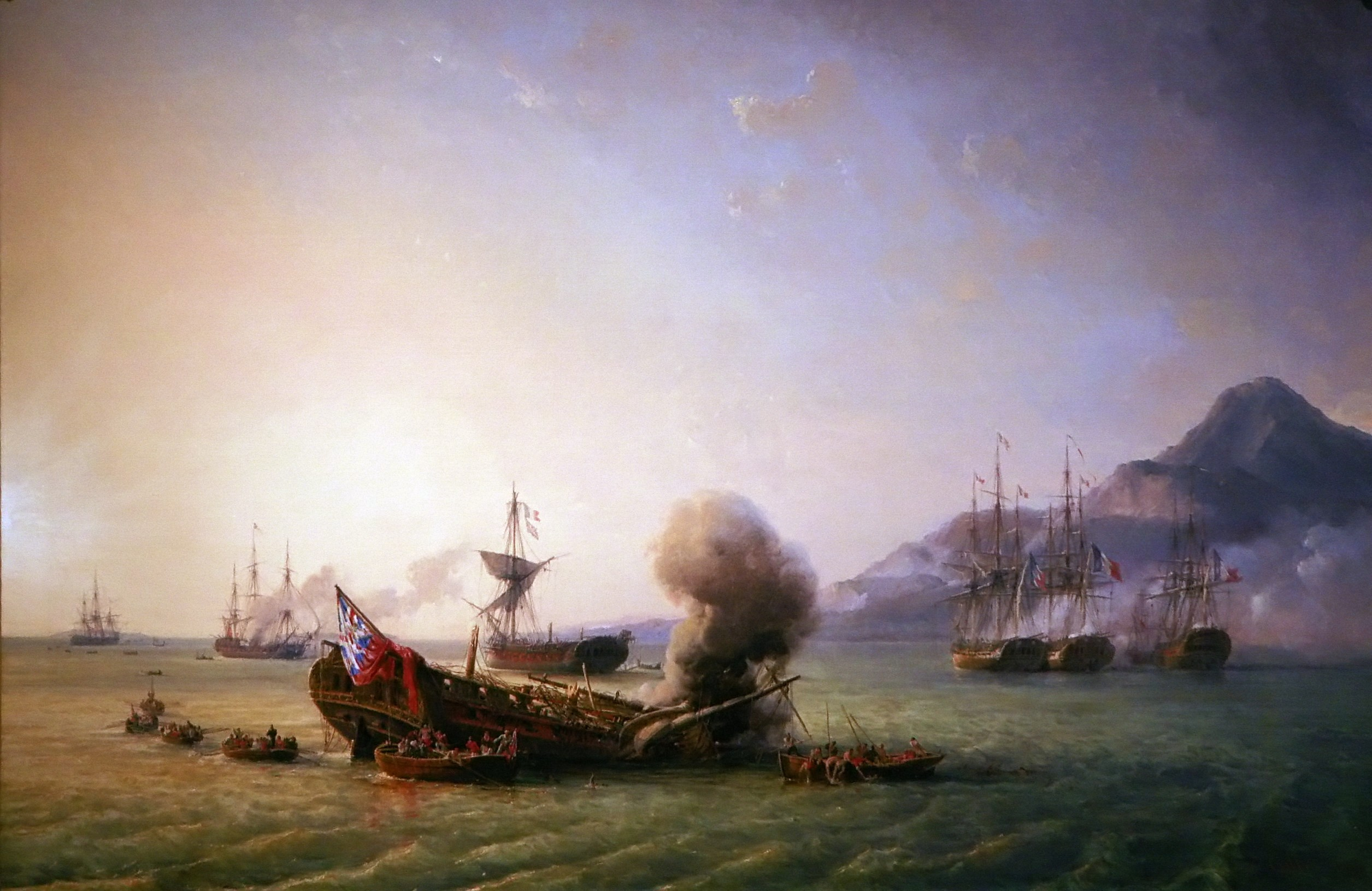
August 20–27: Battle of Grand Port

1810 (MDCCCX) was a common year starting on Monday of the Gregorian calendar and a common year starting on Saturday of the Julian calendar, the 1810th year of the Common Era (CE) and Anno Domini (AD) designations, the 810th year of the 2nd millennium, the 10th year of the 19th century, and the 1st year of the 1810s decade. As of the start of 1810, the Gregorian calendar was 12 days ahead of the Julian calendar, which remained in localized use until 1923.

== Events ==
=== January–March ===
- January 1 – Major-General Lachlan Macquarie officially becomes Governor of New South Wales.
- January 4 – Australian seal hunter Frederick Hasselborough discovers Campbell Island, in the Subantarctic.
- January 12 – The marriage of Napoleon I and Joséphine is annulled.
- February 13 – After seizing Jaén, Córdoba, Seville and Granada, Napoleonic troops enter Málaga under the command of General Horace Sebastiani.
- February 17 – Napoleon I decrees that Rome would become the second capital of the French Empire.
- February 20 – Tyrolean rebel leader Andreas Hofer is executed.
- March 11 – Napoleon I marries Marie-Louise of Austria by proxy in Vienna.

=== April–June ===
- April 2 – Emperor Napoleon I of France marries Marie-Louise of Austria in person in Paris.
- April 19 – Venezuela achieves home rule: Vicente Emparán, Governor of the Captaincy General of Venezuela, is removed by the people of Caracas, and Supreme Junta is installed. Venezuela is the first South American state to proclaim independence from Spain.
- April 27 – Beethoven composes his famous piano piece, Für Elise.
- May 1 – Macon's Bill Number 2 becomes law in the United States, intending to motivate Britain and France to stop seizing American vessels during the Napoleonic Wars.
- April – Kaumualii receives an assurance of the continued independence of the Kingdom of Hawaii.
- May 3 – Lord Byron swims across the Hellespont in Turkey.
- May 10 – Rev. Henry Duncan opens the world's first commercial savings bank, in Ruthwell, Scotland.
- May 16 – Johann Wolfgang von Goethe publishes his book Zur Farbenlehre (Theory of Colours).
- May 18–25 – May Revolution: Armed citizens of Buenos Aires expel the Viceroy and establish a provincial government for Argentina (the Primera Junta). Baltasar Hidalgo de Cisneros is removed.
- June 7 – Argentina's new junta publishes the country's first newspaper, the Gazeta de Buenos-Ayres, edited by Mariano Moreno.
- June 23 – John Jacob Astor forms the Pacific Fur Company.
- June – Nicolas Appert publishes L'art de conserver pendant plusieurs années toutes les substances animales ou végétales, the first description of modern food preservation using airtight containers.

=== July–September ===
- July 9
  - Napoleon I dissolves the Kingdom of Holland, ruled by his younger brother Louis Bonaparte, and annexes the country into the French Empire.
  - Russia acquires Sukhumi through a treaty with the Abkhazian dukes, and declares a protectorate over the whole of Abkhazia.
- July 10 - Peninsular War: Siege of Ciudad Rodrigo: French forces (28,000 men) under Marshal André Masséna take the fortified city of Ciudad Rodrigo on route into Portugal.
- July 11 – Frederick Hasselborough discovers Macquarie Island, in the subantarctic.
- July 20 – First Republic of New Granada: Patria Boba: A junta of seven patriots, led by José Acevedo y Gómez, assemble in Bogotá in the Viceroyalty of New Granada (modern-day Colombia), to declare its independence from the Spanish Empire, the first South American nation to break away from Spain as the third oldest independent republic state after Haiti.
- July 24 – Paraguay governor Bernardo de Velasco and the Cabildo of Asunción declare their loyalty to Ferdinand VII of Spain and break up their relationship with Buenos Aires.
- August 2 – In Quito, Ecuador, 200 citizens are slaughtered in the Royal barracks and the surrounding streets by royalist troops.
- August 6 – The city of Santa Cruz de Mompox, in modern-day Colombia, declares independence from the Spanish Empire.
- August 20–27 – Battle of Grand Port: The French defeat a Royal Navy frigate squadron attempting to blockade a harbour on Isle de France (Mauritius).
- August 21 – Jean Baptiste Bernadotte, Marshal of France, is elected Crown Prince of Sweden, by the Swedish Riksdag of the Estates.
- August 27 – Peninsular War: Siege of Almeida: French forces under André Masséna capture the fortified city of Almeida before the advance toward Lisbon.
- September 8 – The Tonquin sets sail from New York Harbor, with 33 employees of John Jacob Astor's newly created Pacific Fur Company on board. After a six-month journey around the tip of South America, the ship arrives at the mouth of the Columbia River, and Astor's men establish the fur-trading town of Astoria.
- September 16 – Grito de Dolores: Miguel Hidalgo, a Catholic priest from Guanajuato, incites the revolt that becomes the Mexican War of Independence.
- September 18 – Chile forms its First National Junta, which is the country's first step towards its independence.
- September 22 – Manuel Belgrano prepares his invasion to the Provincia del Paraguay.
- September 23 – The Republic of West Florida declares independence from Spain.
- September 26 – A new Act of Succession is adopted by the Riksdag of the Estates, and Jean Baptiste Bernadotte becomes heir to the Swedish throne.
- September 27 - Peninsular War: Battle of Bussaco: Anglo-Portuguese forces under General Arthur Wellington repel several attacks of the French invasion force (65,000 men) under André Masséna at Bussaco. Wellington is forced to withdraw to the Lines of Torres Vedras after Masséna's troops outflank his positions. The French lose 522 dead and 3,612 wounded. The allied losses are 200 dead and 1,001 wounded.

=== October–December ===
- October – King George III of the United Kingdom is deemed permanently insane.
- October 12 – First Oktoberfest: Bavarian royalty invites the citizens of Munich to join the celebration of the marriage of Crown Prince Ludwig of Bavaria, to Princess Therese of Saxe-Hildburghausen.
- October 27 – The United States annexes the Republic of West Florida.
- November 2 – A peace treaty in Haiti confirms its division between the northern State of Haiti, ruled autocratically by the gen de couleur Henri Christophe, and the southern Republic, ruled by mulatto Alexandre Pétion.
- November 17 – Anglo-Swedish War (1810–12): Sweden declares war on the United Kingdom.
- November 29–December 3 – Invasion of Isle de France: British forces force the French to surrender Isle de France (Mauritius).
- December 20 – Manuel Belgrano crosses the Paraná River to Itapúa Department, starting his invasion of Paraguay.
- December 22 – British ship of the line HMS Minotaur (1793) is wrecked on Texel in the West Frisian Islands with the loss of 500 lives.
- December 27 – Chartered British East Indiaman Elizabeth is wrecked off Dunkirk with the loss of more than 360 lives, many of them lascar seamen.

=== Date unknown ===
- Amadou Lobbo initiates his jihad, in present-day Mali.
- Ching Shih and Cheung Po Tsai surrender their pirate fleet to the Chinese government.
- 4,500 chests of opium are sold in China.

== Births ==
=== January–June ===
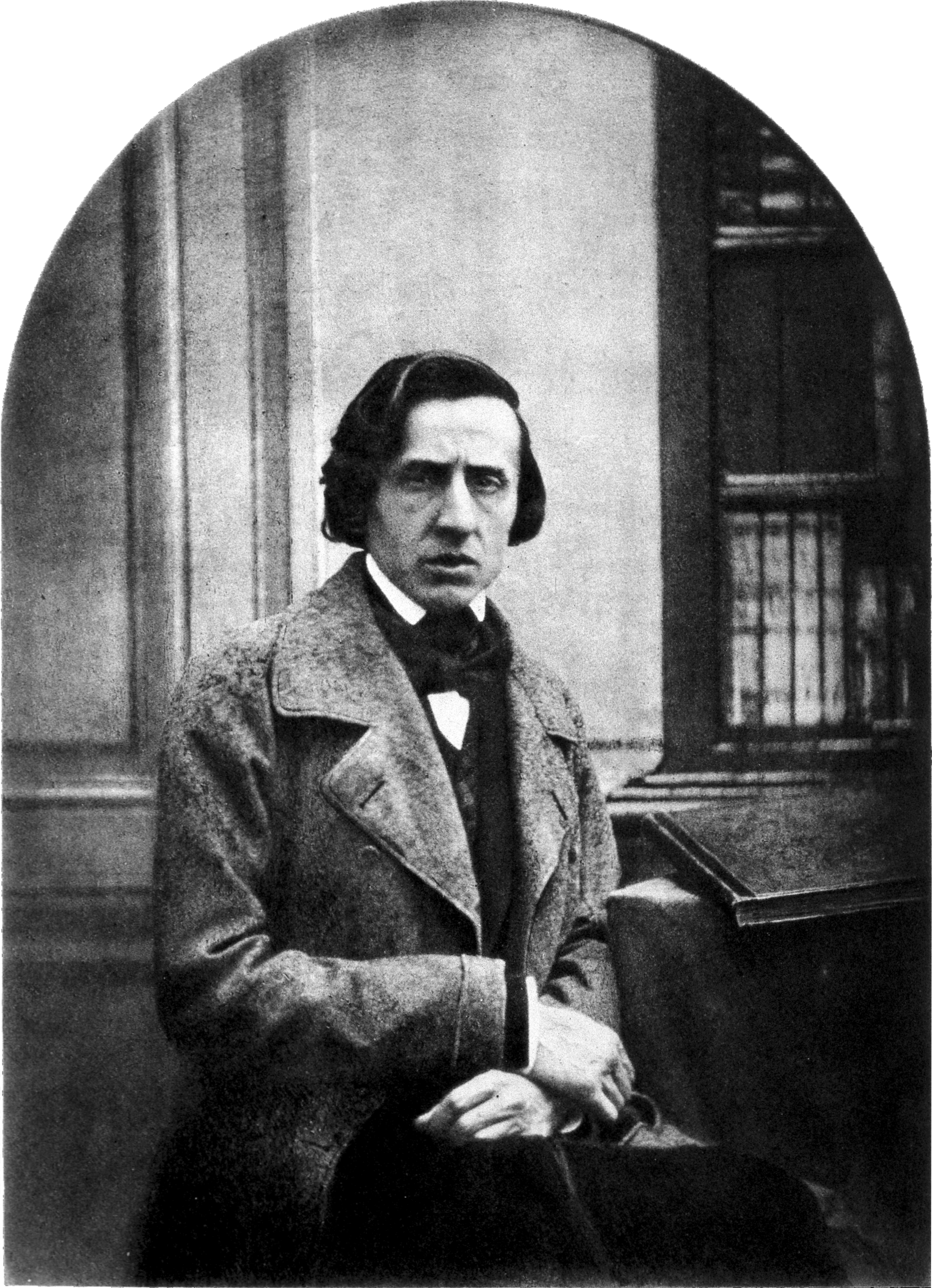
Frédéric Chopin

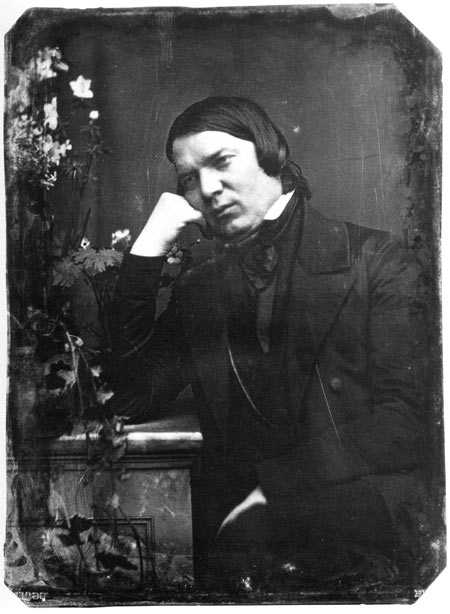
Robert Schumann

- January 3 – Antoine Thomson d'Abbadie, Irish-French geographer (d. 1897)
- January 13 – Ernestine Rose, Polish-born feminist (d. 1892)
- January 29 – Ernst Kummer, German mathematician (d. 1893)
- February 5 – Ole Bull, Norwegian violinist (d. 1880)
- February 8 – Eliphas Levi, French writer (d. 1875)
- March 1 – Frédéric Chopin, Polish composer, pianist (d. 1849)
- March 2 – Pope Leo XIII (b. Vincenzo Gioacchino Raffaele Luigi Pecci) (d. 1903)
- March 10 – Samuel Ferguson, Northern Irish lawyer, poet and artist (d. 1886)
- March 28 – Alexandre Herculano, Portuguese writer and historian (d. 1877)
- March 31 - Hayyim Selig Slonimski Polish-Jewish scientist (d. 1904)
- April 8 – Hégésippe Moreau, French writer and poet (d. 1838)
- May 2 – Hans Christian Lumbye, Danish composer (d. 1874)
- May 23 – Margaret Fuller, American journalist, literary critic and feminist (d. 1850)
- May 24 – Abraham Geiger, German rabbi, founder of European Reform Judaism (d. 1874)
- May 31 – Horatio Seymour, 18th Governor of New York, 1868 Democratic Party Presidential Nominee (d. 1886)
- June 8 – Robert Schumann, German composer and pianist (d. 1856)
- June 9 – Otto Nicolai, German composer and conductor (d. 1849)
- June 14 – Ward Hunt, Associate Justice of the Supreme Court of the United States (d. 1886)

=== July–December ===
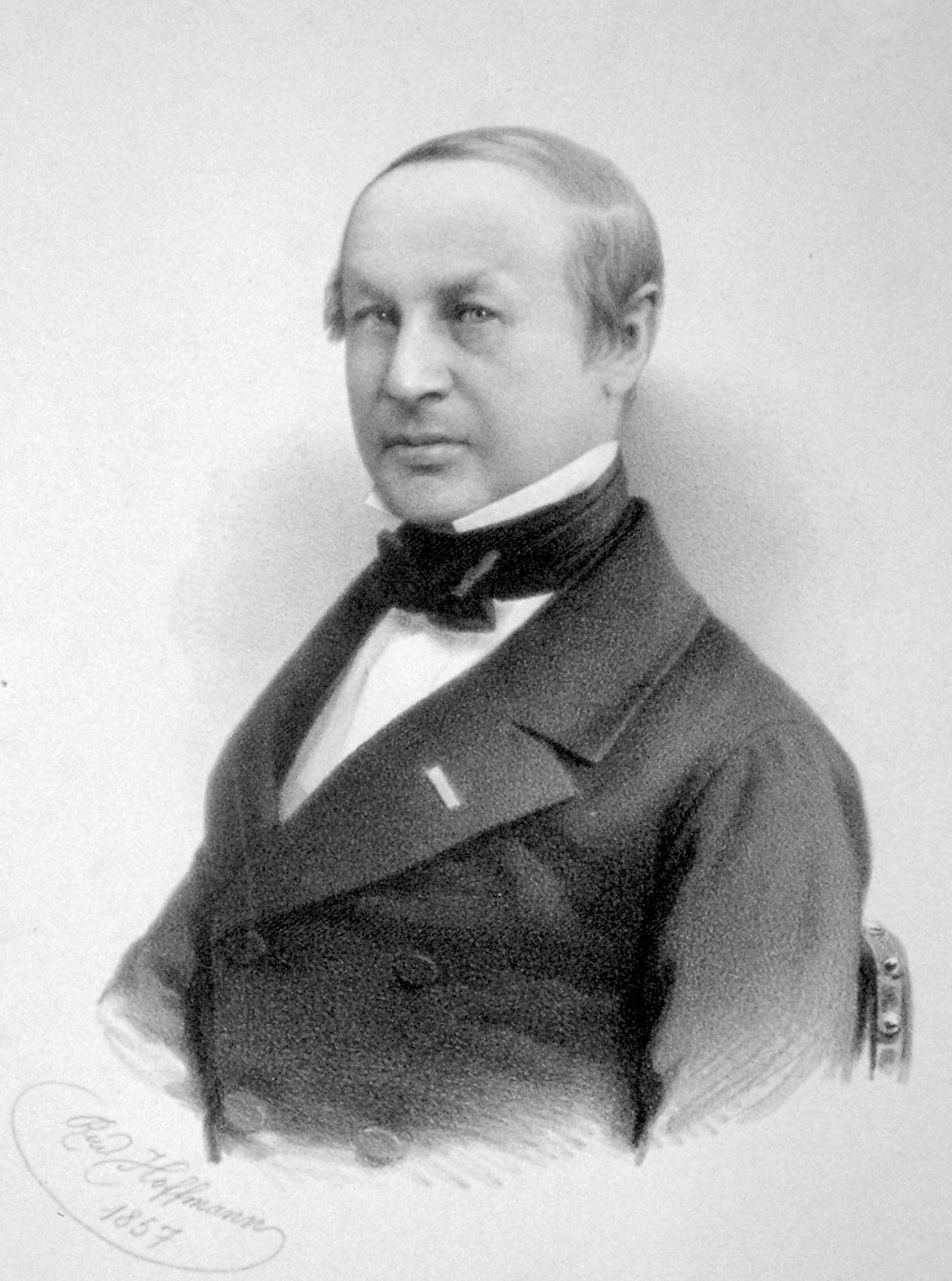
Theodor Schwann

- July 5 – P. T. Barnum, American showman (d. 1891)
- July 20 – Leonhard Graf von Blumenthal, Prussian field marshal (d. 1900)
- July 21 – Henri Victor Regnault, French chemist, physicist (d. 1878)
- August 4 – Maurice de Guérin, French poet (d. 1839)
- August 10 – Camillo Benso, Count of Cavour, 1st Prime Minister of Italy (d. 1861)
- August 24 – Theodore Parker, American preacher, Transcendentalist, and abolitionist (d. 1860)
- August 29 – Juan Bautista Alberdi, Argentinian politician, writer and Constitution main promoter (d. 1884)
- September 29 – Elizabeth Gaskell, British novelist (d. 1865)
- November 3 – Yisroel Salanter, father of the Musar movement in Orthodox Judaism (d. 1883)
- November 7 – Ferenc Erkel, Hungarian musician and composer (d. 1893)
- November 8 – Pierre Bosquet, French general, Marshal of France (d. 1861)
- November 9 – Bernhard von Langenbeck, German surgeon (d. 1887)
- November 26 – William Armstrong, 1st Baron Armstrong, English engineer, inventor of the Hydraulic accumulator (d. 1900)
- December 4 – Barbara Bronisława Czarnowska, Polish noblewoman, independence fighter and soldier (d. 1891)
- December 7 – Theodor Schwann, German physiologist (d. 1882)
- December 11 – Alfred de Musset, French poet (d. 1857)
- December 24 – Wilhelm Marstrand, Danish painter (d. 1873)

=== Date unknown ===
- Nicolae Golescu, 9th Prime Minister of Romania (d. 1877)

== Deaths ==
=== January–June ===
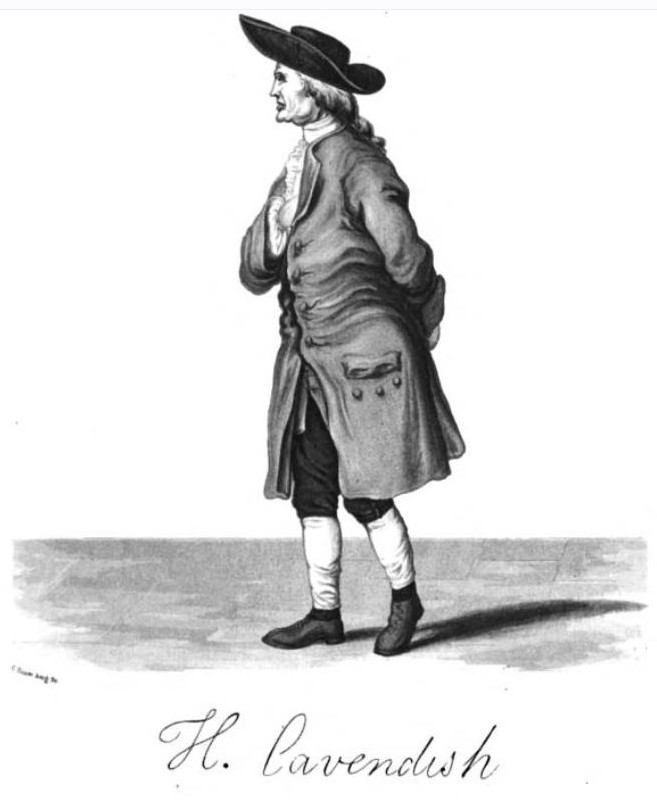
Henry Cavendish

- January 15 – Yekaterina Romanovna Vorontsova-Dashkova, Russian princess, courtier and patron of the arts and sciences, first woman to head a scientific academy (b. 1743)
- January 20 – Benjamin Chew, Chief Justice of colonial Pennsylvania (b. 1722)
- January 23 – Johann Wilhelm Ritter, German chemist, physicist (b. 1776)
- February 20 – Andreas Hofer, Tyrolean national hero (executed) (b. 1767)
- February 22 – Charles Brockden Brown, American novelist (b. 1771; tuberculosis)
- February 24 – Henry Cavendish, British scientist (b. 1731)
- March 7 – Cuthbert Collingwood, 1st Baron Collingwood, British admiral (b. 1750)
- March 10 – Augusta Dorothea, Abbess of Gandersheim, German princess (b. 1749)
- March 12 – Jean-François-Auguste Moulin, member of the French Directory (b. 1752)
- April 25 – Jacob Broom, American businessman and politician (b. 1752)
- April 26 – John Metcalf, English roadbuilder (b. 1717)
- May 9 – Benjamin Lincoln, major general in the Continental Army during the American Revolutionary War (b. 1733)
- May 21 – Chevalier d'Eon, French-born diplomat, spy, soldier and transvestite (b. 1728)
- June 7 – Luigi Schiavonetti, Italian engraver (b. 1765)
- June 26 – Joseph-Michel Montgolfier, French inventor (b. 1740)

=== July–December ===
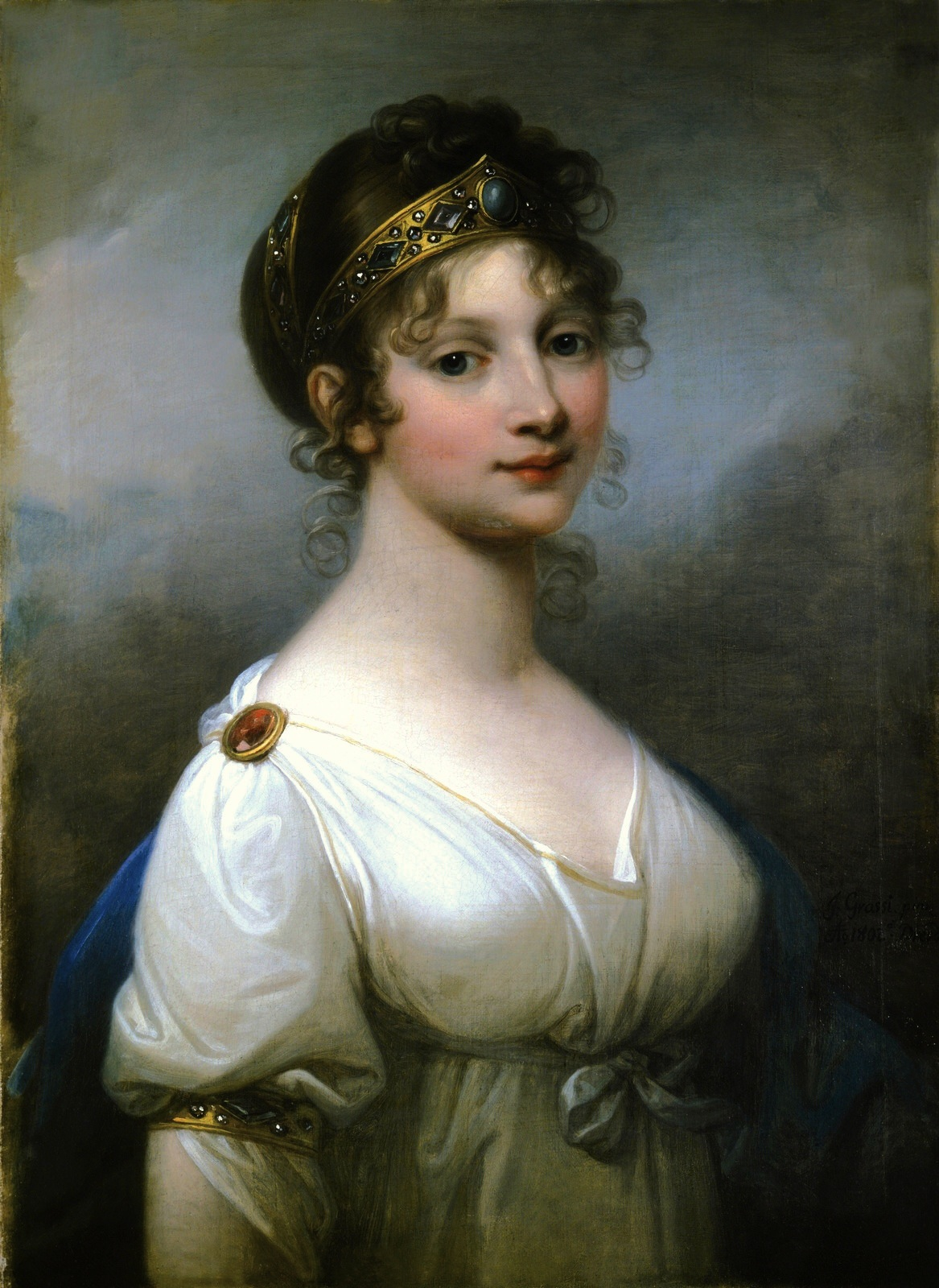
Louise of Mecklenburg-Strelitz

- July 6 – Andrianampoinimerina, ruler of Madagascar (b. 1745)
- July 19 – Louise of Mecklenburg-Strelitz, Queen of Prussia (b. 1776)
- August 12 – Étienne Louis Geoffroy, French pharmacist, entomologist (b. 1725)
- August 26 – Santiago de Liniers, 1st Count of Buenos Aires, French officer in Spanish colonial military service (executed) (b. 1753)
- September 13 – William Cushing, Associate Justice of the Supreme Court of the United States (b. 1732)
- September 17 – Ulla von Höpken, Swedish courtier, influential socialite (b. 1749)
- October 15 – Alfred Moore, American judge (b. 1755)
- October 16 - Nachman of Breslov chassidic master (b. 1772)
- November 2 – Princess Amelia of the United Kingdom, Member of the British Royal Family (b. 1783)
- November 11 – Johan Zoffany, German-born painter (b. 1733)
- December 2 – Philipp Otto Runge, German painter (b. 1777)
- December 5 – Kumara Swamy Desikar, Indian philosopher (b. 1711)
- December 14 – Cyrus Griffin, last President of the Continental Congress (b. 1749)
