= Neerotta Yamaha Anthathi =

Collection of Tamil poems by Siva Prakasar

The Neerotta Yamaha Anthathi is a collection of Thirty one stanzas (Venpaas) in Tamil written by Siva Prakasar also called as 'Siva anuputhi selvar, 'Karpanai Kalangiyam', 'Thurai mangalam Sivaprakasar' . Shaiva Siddhanta.

== Overview ==
Those Thirty one poems were compiled as four – four lines.

== Poet ==
Siva prakasar, a Tamil Phiolospher, Sage, Poet lived at the end of 17th century. It is a collection of venpaas.

== Historical Incidence to compile this book ==
On one of his journeys around Tamil Nadu, Sivaprakasa Swamigal went to Tirunelveli to meet and be taught by a pandit who was an expert on grammar. This teacher accepted him as his student after Sivaprakasa Swamigal had demonstrated his exceptional proficiency in this subject. The pandit taught him everything he knew, but when Sivaprakasa Swamigal tried to pay for this tuition, he refused, saying that he would like payment of a different sort.

This pandit had been having a bitter feud with another scholar. Sivaprakasa Swamigal's teacher said, 'Go to this man, defeat him in a contest of Tamil prosody, and as a condition of his defeat, make him prostrate to me'. Sivaprakasa Swamigal accepted the assignment, located the rival scholar, and challenged him to compose spontaneous verses, on a specified topic that they would both pick, that had no labial sounds in them. That is to say, the verses had to be composed without any letters such as 'm' and 'p', which are sounded by putting the lips together. The scholar was unable to compose a single verse with this restriction, whereas Sivaprakasa Swamigal managed to produce thirty-one on the prescribed theme. The rival scholar accepted defeat and went to prostrate before Sivaprakasa Swamigal's grammar teacher.

| Verses | Explanation |
|---|---|
கடவுள் வாழ்த்து
ma. Pa won't come
