= Perumathur =

- Village
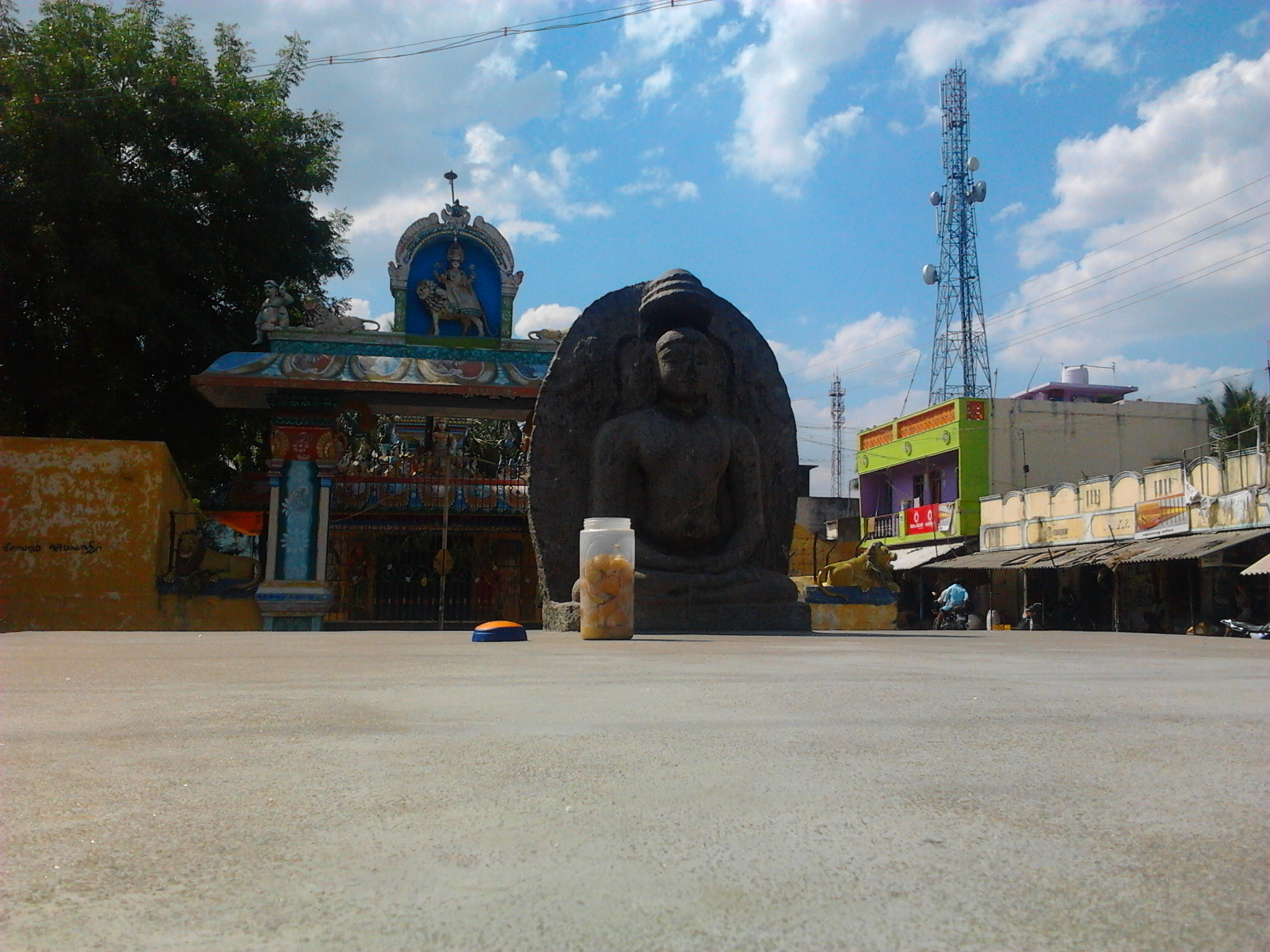

- Location in Tamil Nadu, India Perumathur (India)
- Coordinates: 11.339541°N 79.018575°E
- Country: India
- State: Tamil Nadu
- District: Perambalur
- Elevation: 143 m (469 ft)

Population (2011)
  - Total: 3,406
  - Male population: 1,644
  - Female population: 1,762

Languages
  - Official: Tamil
- Time zone: UTC+5:30 (IST)
- PIN: 621 717
- Vehicle registration: TN 46

Perumathur is a village in India. It is located in the Kunnam taluk of the Perambalur district in the state of Tamil Nadu, approximately 233 kilometres (145 mi) from the state capital of Chennai. For administrative purposes, Perumathur is divided into three sub-villages: Milaganatham, Nallur (originally named Pallakadu), and Perumathur Kudikadu.

== Demographics ==
At the time of the 2001 Indian census, Perumathur had a population of 3,416 people, with 1,644 males and 1,772 females.

As of 2001, Perumathur had an average literacy rate of 58 percent, which was higher than the national average of 51.5 percent. The literacy rate was 57 percent for men and 33 percent for women. It was reported that approximately 12 percent of the population was under the age of 6.

== Nearby villages ==
Villages located near Perumathur (in order of increasing distance) are Sirumathur (1.9 km), Karugudi (2.5 km), Eraiyur (4 km), Pennakonam (4.5 km), Nannai (4.6 km), Eraiyur (5.1 km), and Paravai (5.9 km). Other nearby towns are Veppur (6.5 km), Thungapuram (12 km), Perambalur (19.4 km), Alathur (20.1 km), and Veppanthattai (21.6 km).

== Climate ==
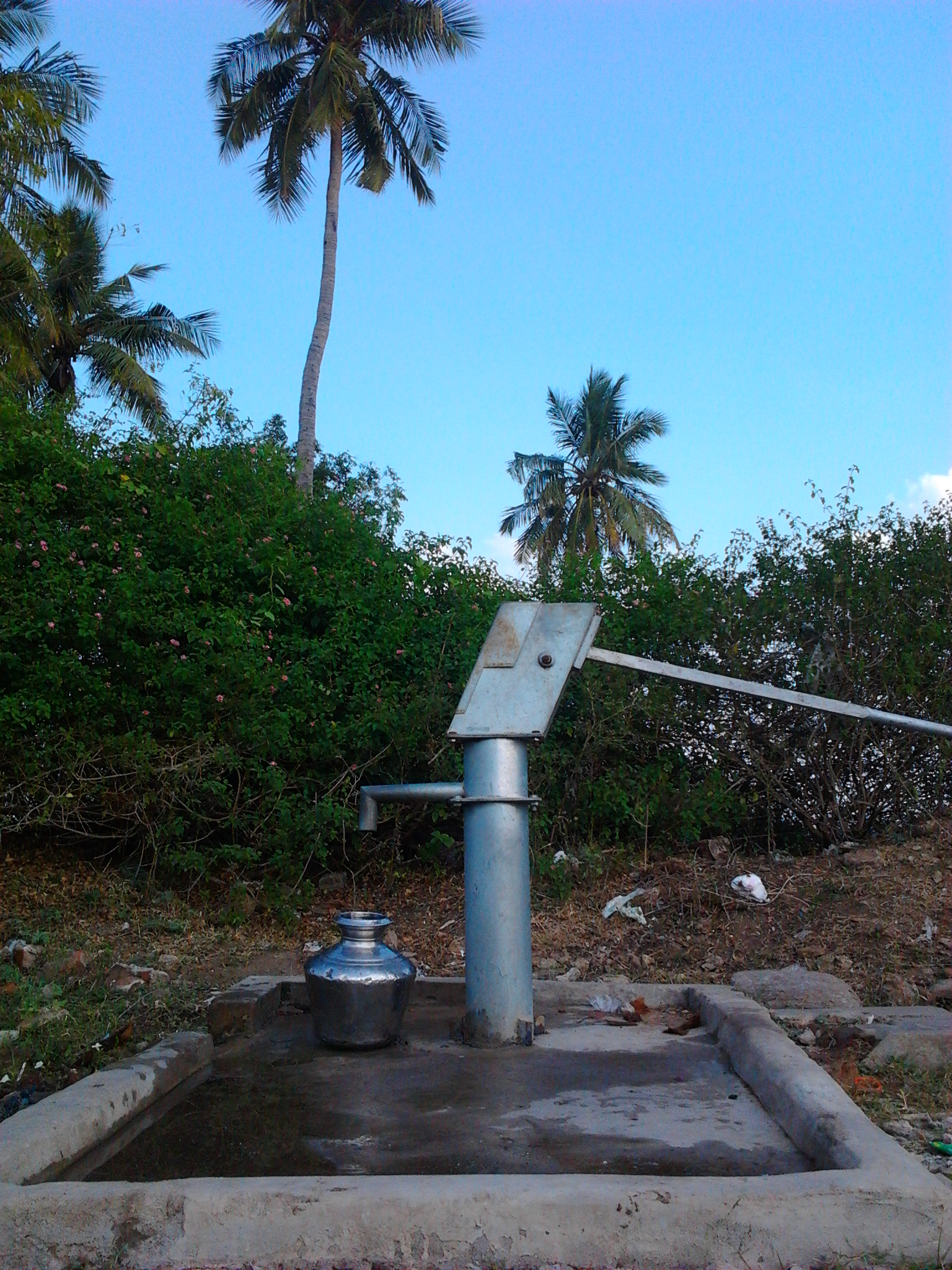
A groundwater pump in the village

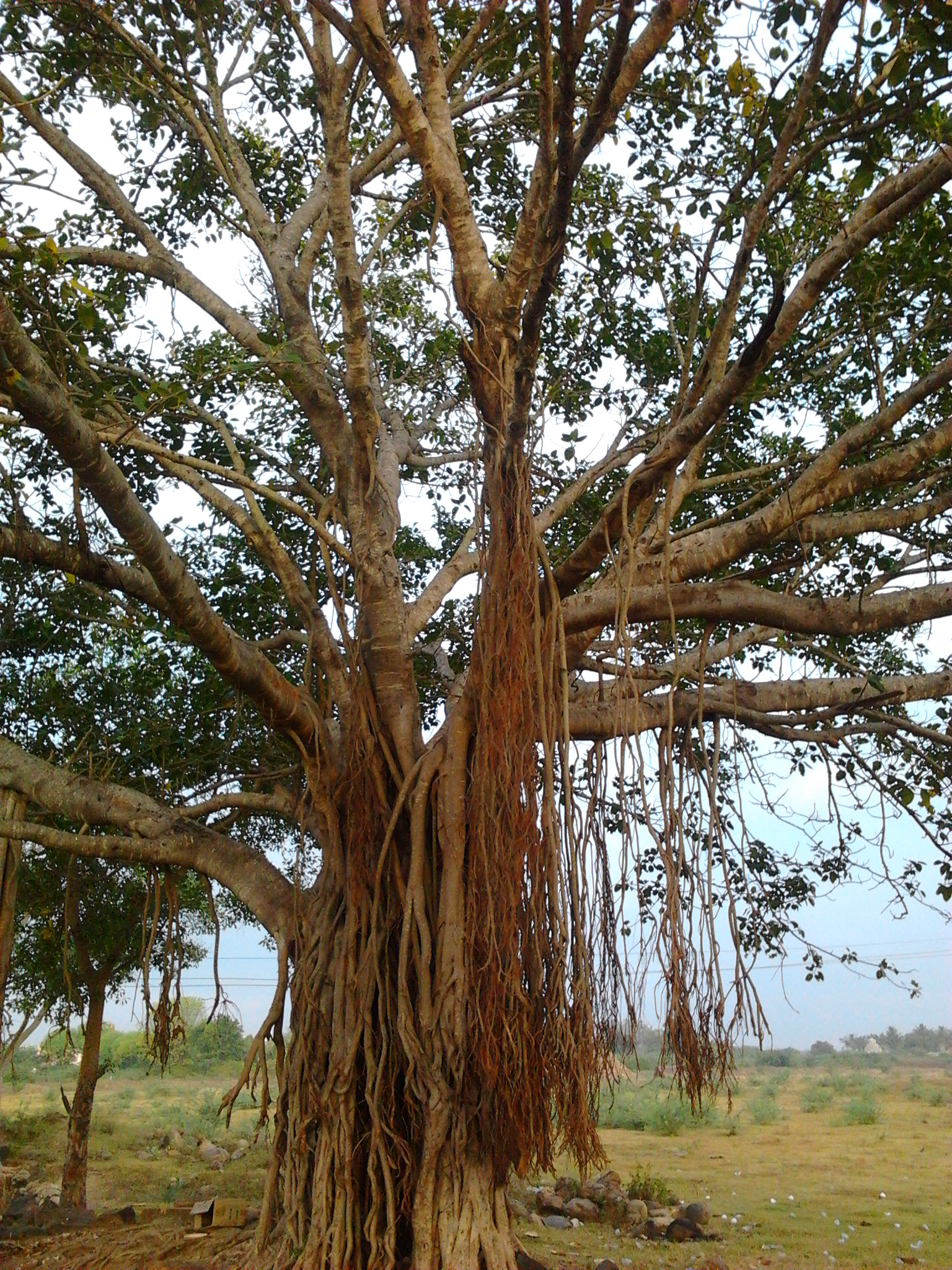
Banyan trees are very common here.

The temperature is moderate, with the maximum and minimum temperatures averaging 37 °C and 22 °C respectively. The village gets its rainfall from the northeast monsoon and the southwest monsoon. The average annual rainfall is 1,060 mm.

== Temples ==
- Lord Shiva temple
- Krishna Temple
- Selliyamman Kovil
- Maariyamman temple
- Perumal temple
- Ayyanar temple
- Velaiyar Swamigal Jeeva Samadhi
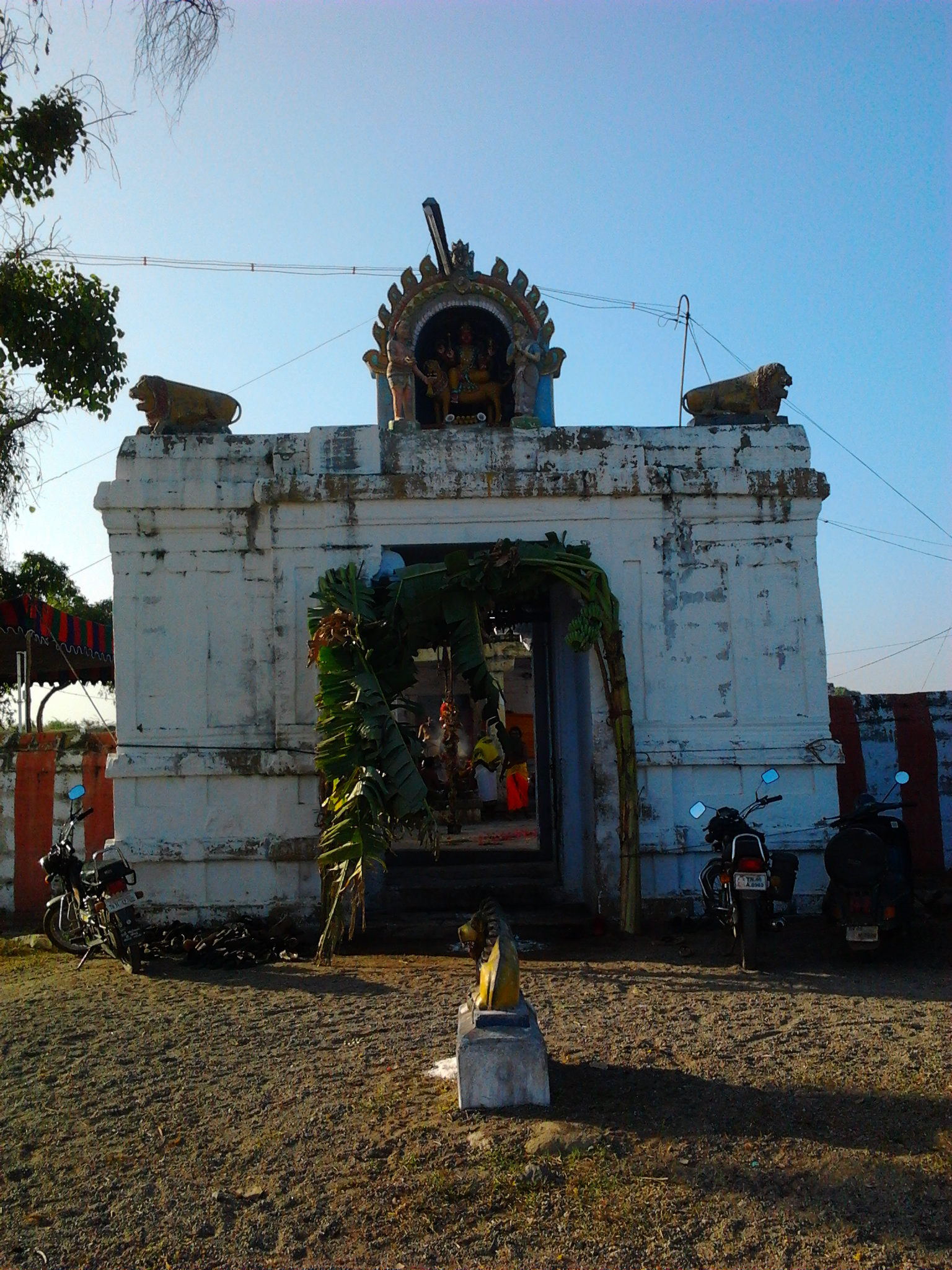
Chelliamman (or Selliamman) Temple entrance

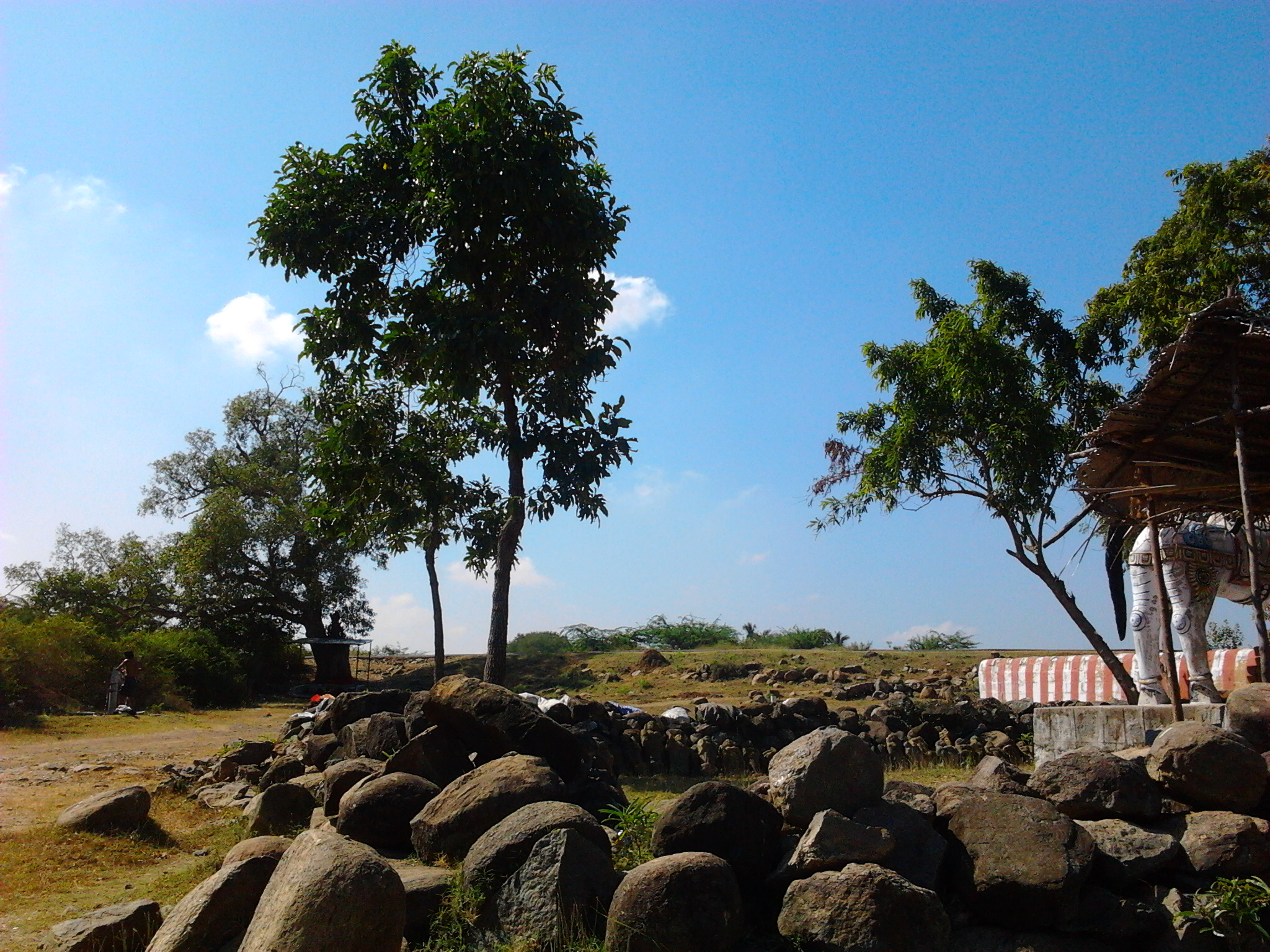
At an Aiyanar Temple

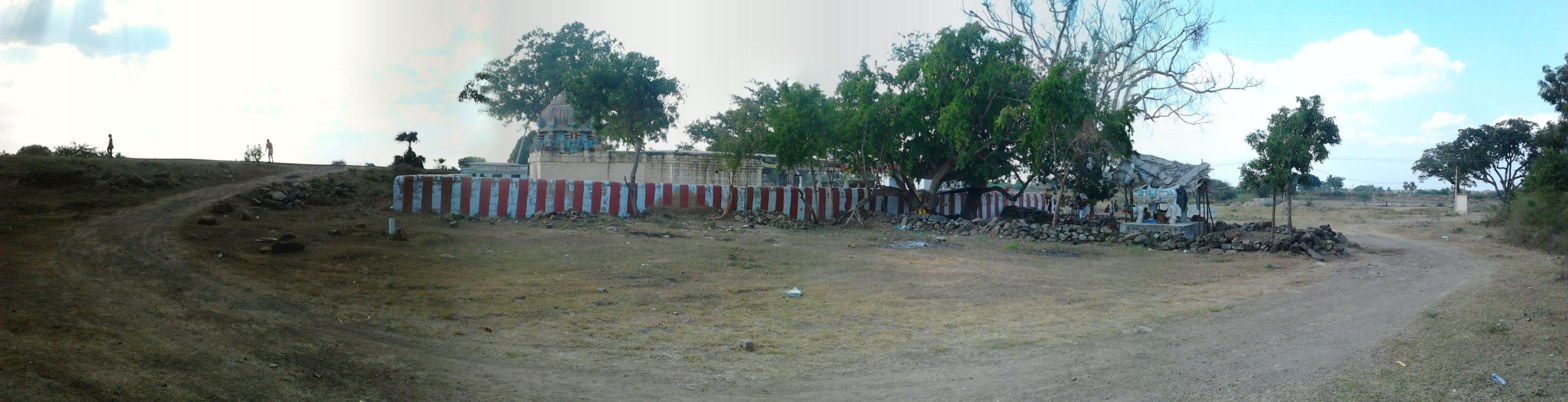
A panoramic view near Chelliamman Temple

== Churches ==
Perumathur belongs to the Eraiyur parish. Perumathur, Poonagaram, Milakainatham, Nellore and Keelapuliur are its substations.

There are chapels in Perumathur and Poonagaram villages.

== Education ==
Colleges near Perumathur:

- Srinivasan Engineering College.
- Thanthai Roever College of Nursing.
- Modern Arts and Science College.
- Bharathidhasan University College of Women in Veppur.
- Dhanalakshmi Srinivasan Medical College and Hospital.
- Roever Engineering College.

Schools near Perumathur:

- Government Higher Secondary School.
- St. John's High School, Permathur.
- Nehru Higher Secondary School, Eraiyur.
- St. Mary's R.C. School, Eraiyur.

== Economy ==
Agriculture is the backbone of Perumathur's economy.

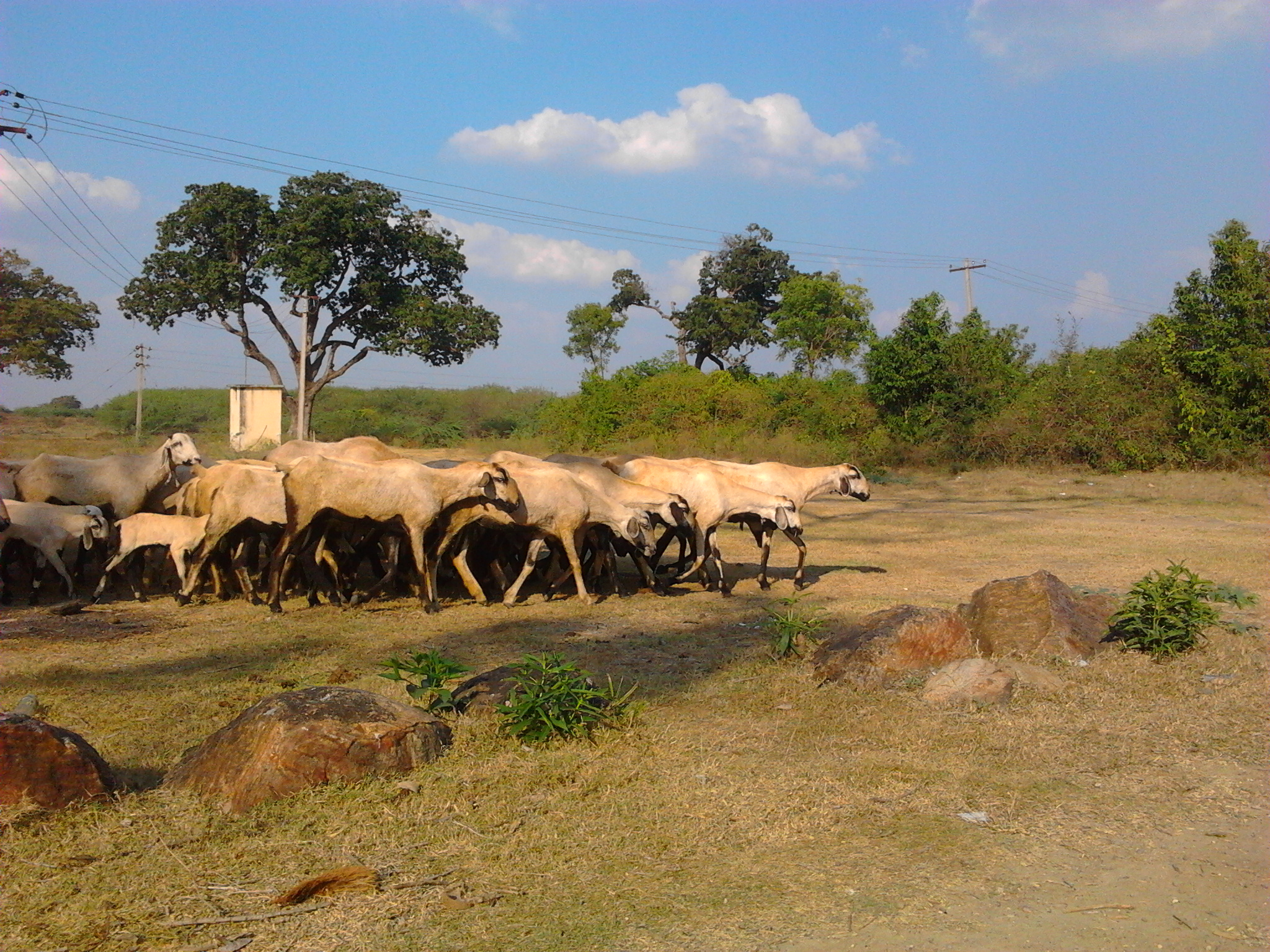
A goatherd

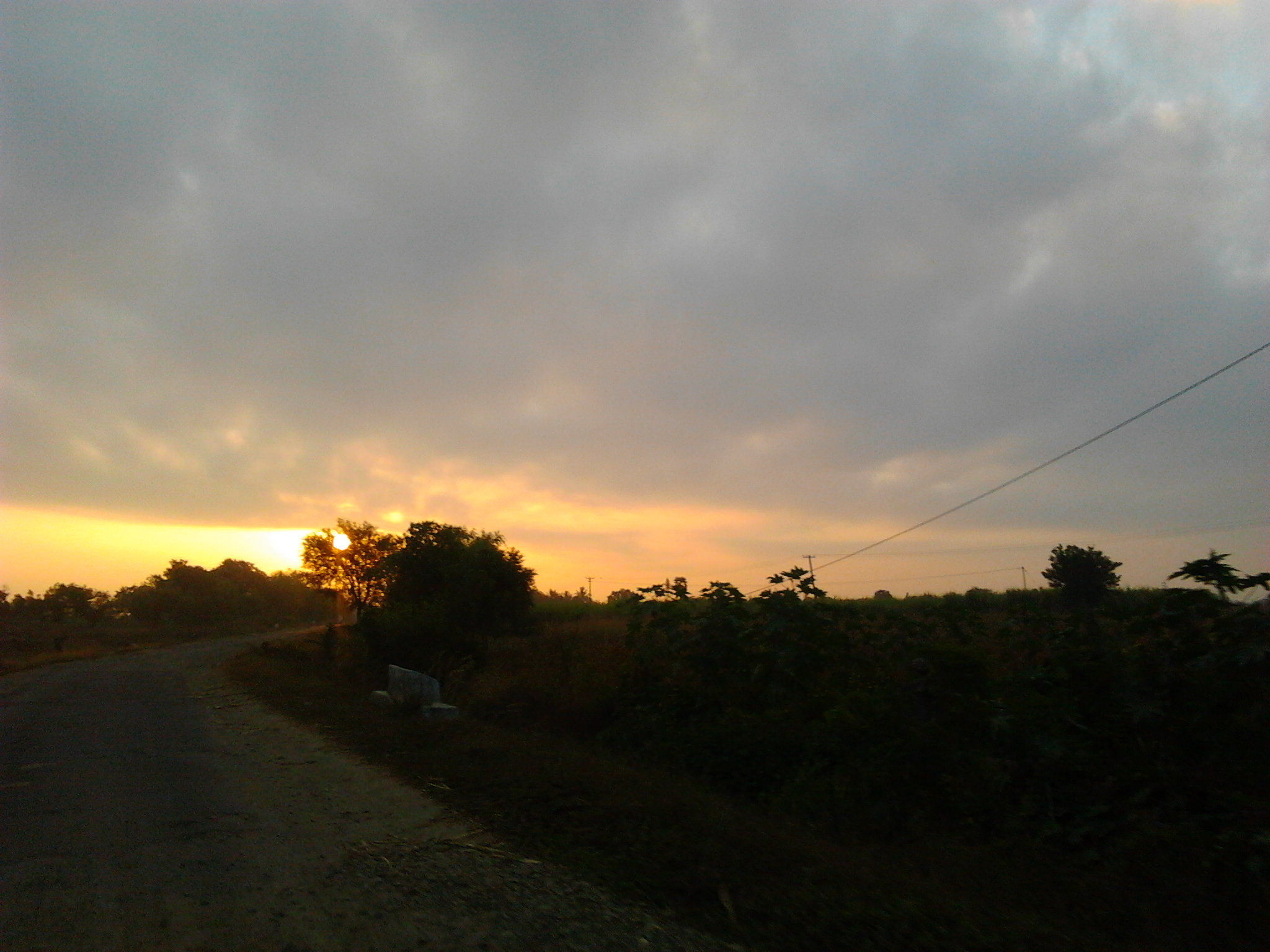
Sunrise as seen near the paddy fields
