= Perur Santhalinga Swamigal =

Indian Saiva spiritual writer

Santhalinga Swamigal (Santhalingam) was a Saiva spiritual writer in Perur, known as West-Chidambaram, Tamil Nadu. Santhalinga swamigal was born to a Tamil-speaking family. That village is called Perur in Tamil Nadu, South India into an orthodox Saiva Tamil family around the middle of the 17th century.

== Early life ==
St. Santhalingar lived in Perur three hundred years ago. Perur is known as Chidambaram west. (The chidambaram East is in South Arcot Dt.) It is believed that he should have been born either in the "Nadu Nadu" or "Thondai Nadu" where the 'Vira Saiva' religion, was popular. From his very childhood he developed love to serve Lord Siva ascetics, to respect and revere the symbols of Siva, namely Vibuthi and Rudraksha. His company with holy people inducted him to perceive the vanity of the worldly things. He abhorred the idea of birth and rebirth. He under took a pilgrimage to all the holy cities where Lord Siva reigns supreme in search of a Guru who could initiate him in this birth ridding process.

== Perur village ==
Perur is sacred not only because it is one of the 'sivasthalams' of Kongunadu, but also because the Divine grace of Lord Siva is so immanent and perceptible that when Sundaramoorthy Nayanar, one of the four preceptors of Saivism, went to chidambaram to worship Lord Nataraja, he found there but the deity of Perur. He stays in this Thillaikkoil hymn.

== Siva prakasar and Santhalinga Swamigal ==
Sri-la-Sri. Sivagnana Balaya Swamigal II, the Head of the Bommaiya Adheenami was his contemporary, whose miraculous feats and wealth of -Sivagnanam- possessed wide popularity. St.Santhalinga Swamigal desired to see him, During his sojourn there, he got the acquaintance of Thuraimangalam Sivaprakasa Swamigal, a great seer, a Virasaiva saint, scholar and poet at Thiruvannamalai. St.Santhalinga Swamigal enjoyed the company of Siva Prakasar. Along with him, he went and stayed at Bommaiyapuram

=== Gnambikai Ammal and Santhalinga Swamigal ===
With the blessings of St Sivagnana Balaysswamigal. St. Santhalingaswamigal married Gnanambikai She is the sister of Siva prakasa Swamigal, Velaiyar and Karunai Prakasar. His family life was in conformity with the maxim "If a man fulfilled aright the duties of the house-holder, where is the need for him to take up other duties?" His family life never stood in the way of his endeavours in realisation of Truth. By undaunted perseverance he rose to perfection. Pupils flocked around him to par take his teachings. One day when he spoke on total renunciation, condemning the love for transient worldly things, some of his reactionary students began to indulge in scandalising the verity of his speech. "Could it be possible for a man living with his wife to preach total renunciation, unless he be a hypocrite?" they doubted. Sensing their feelings, St.Santhalingar, seated his wife Mrs. Gnambikai on his lap and continued his teaching. To their utter bewilderment they saw Lord Neelkanta with his consort Gowri in the place of St.Santhalingar and his wife Gnanambikai. The pupils fell down instantaneously before Swamigal and apologised fervently for their mistake. Swamigal took pity on them and loved them more than before. After this incident he resolved to renounce the world thoroughly in its entirety and declared that he would set out for alms next day and that if he was served rice with milk at the very first house he approached, he would become a complete ascetic thenceforth. He was served rice with milk at the very first house he resorted to. From that moment he broke all his worldly attachment and renounced the world utterly.

He sent away his wife Gnanambikai to her brother siva Prakasar who was the Prime disciple of the Pommapura Aadeenam. There were no issues for them. She stayed along with his brother Velaiyar and became a part of the brought of her brother's son Sundaresanar.

== The later years ==
At a proper time St.Santhalinga Swamigal gave vent to his long cherished desire to be initiated in the noble venture of the realisation of God. Observing the 'upadesa', he was enjoying the divine bliss in the presence of his Guru. Sometime later, his Guru ordered him to settle in a place he liked and work for the salvation of the humanity. Obeying the order, St.Santhalinga Swamigal settled at Perur, the holy city where his favourite deity Lord Nataraja reigns supreme and continued his religious pursuits. His fame began to spread far and wide around Perur. His retinue began to swell in the form of followers and well-wishers. Except the time he spent for bathing, dieting and teaching, almost the whole of the day was devoted in meditation. One day when he opened his eyes after meditation, Lord Nataraja with his consort Maragathabikai., -seated on Nandhi, appeared before him. St.Santhalinga Swamigal enjoyed the vision of God with devouring look. He, with down pouring eyes, hands folded on his head with reverence, with melting heart, prostrated before the God numberless times. His hymns bear many references vouching for this incident (Vairakkiya Catakam Devotional part) when the vision disappeared his languish was indescribable. He craved to have the 'darshan' once again as can be seen in his works. The power of his 'Tapas' was so strong that whenever he set out for alms, the womenfolk hurriedly rushed to cover their sons and men folk, fearing that his very sight would infuse in them 'Vairakkiya' and render them renounce the world immediately

== Perur St.Santhalinga swamigal's Disciple ==
Of his numerous pupils, Kumara Deva – was a prince of Kannada Desa and also, the author of many Vedantha works in Tamil. Perur Chidambara Swamigal, the commentator of St.Santhalinga Swamigal's works, was his disciple.

=== End of life ===
At the age of Ninety nine St.Santhaling Swamigal entered into eternal bliss on 'Makam' day in the month of 'Masi'. His body was laid in Samadhi in Perur, around, where the present shrine and other institutions have grown up.

== Writings ==
- Kolai Maruthal (Taboo of Killing)
- Vairakkiya chathakam
- Vairakkiya Deepam
- Aviroda Undiyar.
