= Yesu Matha Niragaranam =

The Yesu Matha Niragaranam (யேசு மத நிராகரணம், The Refuting the Religion of Jesus) is a Tamil tract against Christianity, written by Siva Prakasar. The book includes brief examples and analogies. It is a classic instance of a clash between a Semitic religion and an oriental tradition. The concept of karma and sin have crossed in the debate.

== Siva Prakasar ==
Siva Prakasar was a Tamil philosopher, sage and poet who lived at the end of 17th century. He was also called "Siva anuputhi selvar", "Karpanai Kalangiyam", and "Thurai mangalam Sivaprakasar". A Shaiva Siddhanta, he contributed more than 34 books to Tamil literature.

== History ==
The historian Roberto de Nobili met Prakasar and debated with him about Hinduism and Christianity. After the debate, Prakasar compiled his book. No copies of the book have been found. Some writers say that Prakasar debated with Rev. Fr. Constanzo Beschi (alias Veera ma munivar) rather than de Nobili.

S.V.S. Rathinam, a bench magistrate from Prakasar's brother Velaiyar's lineage, mentioned this book in his autobiography Naan Ungal Thoni. He wrote that his grandfather Susai, alias Swaminatha Desikar, son of Sundaresanar, had a palm leaflet copy.
