= Sona Saila Maalai =

The Sona Saila Maalai is a collection of one hundred stanzas (Venpaas) in Tamil written by the 17th-century poet and philosopher Siva Prakasar.

== The poems ==
The hundred poems were compiled to illustrate various patterns of Tamil grammar. Each poem of Sona saila maalai is generally named after its first few words.

== Poet ==
Siva Prakasar, a Tamil philosopher, sage, and poet, lived at the end of 17th century.
