= Sivaprakasa Visagam =

The Sivaprakasa Visagam is a collection of poems in Tamil written by Siva Prakasar, composed in favour of 'Sivagna Balaya Swamigal of Pomma Pura Aaddeenam.
