= Prabhu Linga Leelai =

The Prabhu Linga Leelai Venpaas in Tamil written by Siva Prakasar also called as 'Siva anuputhi selvar, 'Karpanai Kalangiyam', 'Thurai mangalam Sivaprakasar'. He compiled more than thirty original works and few more translation works from Kannada and Sanskrit.

== Overview ==
Those poems were compiled as Venpa, Viruthan, Kalithurai, Agaval… It's a translation work. Prabhulinga Leelai, the work that the following translation comes from, chronicles the life and deeds of Allama Prabhu, a 12th-century Lingayata saint and teacher. There are two traditions regarding AllamaPrabhu's life. One sees himas a manifestation of Siva Himself who came to the world to teach the path of freedom.

== The Original Version ==
"Prabhu Linga Leelai" is a 15th-century Lingayata work, written in Kannada and comprising 1,111 verses. It was originally composed when a Lingayata scholar, Chamarasa, was challenged to produce a work that was greater than either the Mahabharata or the Ramayana by vaishnava courtiers headed by arch rival Kumaravyasa. Shortly afterwards the troubled Chamarasa had a divine dream in which Virabhadra, the son of Siva, asked him to write a long poem on the Lingayata saints of the 12th century. Chamarasa subsequently composed the entire Prabhulinga Leelai in eleven days. The book is based on the life and spiritual experiences of Allama Prabhu and his coequal Sharanas. The poet laureate presented it at the court of his king Deva Raya II where it was approved by both the monarch and the vaishnava scholars who had challenged him.

== Poet ==
Siva prakasar, Shaiva Siddhanta. a Sage, Tamil Poet lived around at the end of the 17th century. This great work was translated into Tamil by one Thuraimangalam Sivaprakasa Swamigal, in the 17th century. The author of the Tamil version, Siva prakasa Swamigal, had a strong connection with Tiruvannamalai. His father, Kumaraswami Desikar, used to come to Arunachala from Kanchipuram every year for the Deepam festival. It is said that his three sons, of whomSivaprakasa Swamigal was the eldest, were all born by the grace of Arunachala. When Sivaprakasa Swamigal grew up, he had a Guru in Tiruvannamalai —also called Sivaprakasa —whom he visited regularly. On his first Pradakshina of Arunachala, Sivaprakasa Swamigal composed Sonasaila Malai, a hundred-verse poem in praise of Arunachala.

== Last Days ==
Sivaprakasa Swamigal died when he was thirty-two.

== Verses and Explanation ==
Sivaprakasa Swamigal follows this tradition in Prabhulinga Leelai. The other version of his life, which is found in a fifteenth-century biography by Harihara, describes a more normal upbringing in the family of a temple drummer. Whatever the truth of the matter, there is general agreement that he was one of the most eminent saints, poets and Gurus of the Lingayata school. More details of his life will be given in the notes to the verses. Each Venpa of 'Prabhu Linga Leelai' is generally named by the first few words of the poem. These are given first and a translation into verse given then:-

Verses	Explanation
துறைமங்கலம் சிவப்பிரகாச சுவாமிகள் :-
காப்பு:-
Verse 29: All the scriptures declare that those who do not unite with the band of devotees, who, with the virtuous qualities as their support, never swerve from the pure truth, can never unite, with the One who bears an eye on His forehead. What profit can accrue, so to speak, to one who poses no initial capital? (This speaks about Satsangh, which is also one of the themes of Meykandar's Siva Jnana Bodha Sutrams.)
Verse 42: Was there ever a body born that was able to avoid death? If you throw a stone into the sky, is there any possibility that it will not fall back down? Effects, however significant and enduring, will pass away, But that which does not undergo death, and is known as the Cause, that endures always!

== Translations ==
Some verses have been translated by Robert Butler, T.V. Venkatasubramanian and David Godman and an article appears in Advent 2005 issue of Mountain Path.
