= Elizabeth (1801 ship) =

British East Indiaman launched at Liverpool

History

United Kingdom
- Name: Elizabeth
- Owner: 1801:Robert Charnock; 1809:Hutton
- Builder: William Naylor Wright, Liverpool
- Launched: 2 May 1801
- Fate: Wrecked 27 December 1810

General characteristics
- Type: Ship
- Tons burthen: 609, or 60949/94 or 635, or 644, or 650 (bm)
- Length: overall:125 ft 7 1/2 in (38.3 m); Keel:100 ft 4 1/4 in (30.6 m)
- Beam: 33 ft 9 1/2 in (10.3 m)
- Depth of hold: 12 ft 6 in (3.8 m)
- Propulsion: Sail
- Complement: 60
- Armament: 14 × 9-pounder guns
- Notes: Three decks

Elizabeth was launched at Liverpool in 1801. She made one voyage for the British East India Company (EIC). She wrecked, with great loss of life, in December 1810, early in the outward leg of a second voyage to India for the EIC.

== Career ==
Elizabeth appears in the 1801 volume of Lloyd's Register with S. Haws, master, Charnck, owner, and trade London—Cape of Good Hope.

The EIC chartered Elizabeth for a voyage to the Cape and China. Captain Stephen Hawes sailed from Liverpool on 12 May 1801. He acquired a letter of marque on 29 May 1801. Elizabeth sailed from Portsmouth on 27 June, reached the Cape on 28 October, and arrived at Whampoa Anchorage on 22 January 1802. Homeward bound, she crossed the Second Bar on 25 March, reached Saint Helena on 11 July, and arrived at the Downs on 5 September.

On her return, Elizabeth traded between London—and Amsterdam, presumably during the Peace of Amiens. Between 1804 and 1810, the data in Lloyd's Register and the Register of Shipping is stale dated or missing. It is highly likely that during this period Elizabeth was operating out of India. There are some mentions in passing that suggest as much.

In 1806, the Bombay merchant Framjee Cowajee sent Elizabeth (648 tons (bm)), to Beale & Magniac, in Hong Kong. The London Chronicle mentions "the melancholy particulars of the loss of the East India country ship Elizabeth".

Elizabeth reappeared in the 1810 volume of Lloyd's Register with Hutton, master and owner, and trade London—India. In the Register of Shipping she appeared with Hawes, master, changing to Hutton, Charnock, owner, changing to Capt. & Co., and trade London–India, changing to London–Cape of Good Hope.

Lloyd's Register for 1811, gave the name of Elizabeth's master and owner as Hutton, and her trade as London—India.

== Loss ==
On 27 October 1810, Elizabeth sailed to join the East India fleet at Portsmouth. She was to sail to Bengal for the EIC. She had 382, or 400, or 402 persons aboard. Some 347 of these were lascars that the EIC was returning to India, they having arrived in England as crew on East Indiamen. She also had 30 European passengers (and eight black women servants).

Bad weather forced Elizabeth to put into Cork Harbour. Nine days later she set out again for Madras and Bengal, but continuous heavy gales had repeatedly drove her back up the Channel before managing to anchor on 27 December, off South Foreland.

Unfortunately, under the strain of the wind and the constant exertion, the cables broke, causing Elizabeth to drift towards the French coast. She fired off numerous guns and flares, but those watching on the French shore were powerless to assist due to the powerful waves and wind which would have doomed any rescue attempt. Near Calais she lost her rudder on a rock, and sprang several leaks, leaving her totally at the whim of the sea, which dragged her further down the coastline.

Eventually Elizabeth was wrecked on 27 December 1810, on the Breebank, in the North Sea, off Dunkirk, France. Her masts tumbled overboard, smashing the boats, leaving only three, one of which was swamped within moments of launching. Two other boats brought 22 survivors to shore, but there was no chance of them returning to take off more passengers as the sea had become even more formidable. During the ensuing storm, the ship broke into pieces that scattered all along the coastline, along with its entire remaining crew, who were killed. In all, there were only 22 survivors as the weather also prevented the French from sending assistance. Amongst the survivors were six Britons and 15 lascars, including two of the ship's crew. A complete recounting of the wreck is recounted in a narrative published by Robert Eastwick.

The French took the survivors prisoner, but apparently more to provide housing than actual incarceration. Shortly thereafter, the French repatriated the survivors, requesting the English to release an equal number of French prisoners. (Note: Among the survivors there was a Captain Eastwick, but some news and secondary accounts of the wrecking have assumed that he was Elizabeth's master. He was not. Eastwick himself claims the captain of Elizabeth was named Hutton, however himself and a man by the last name Jackson were also onboard, both sea captains who had operated with the EIC.)

A cartel arrived at Dover on 30 January 1811, with the 22 survivors. The British sent the Elizabeth cartel from Chatham with 18 French prisoners but as she approached Calais the batteries there fired on her and she returned to Dover on 4 March.
