= Nalvar Nanmanimalai =

Tamil Hindu work

The Nalvar Nanmani Malai (Tamil: நால்வர் நான்மணி மாலை, romanized: Nālvar Nāṇmani Mālai) is a Tamil Hindu work written by the poet Siva Prakasar.

== Overview ==
The work describes the history of the four primary Nayanar poet-saints of the Shaiva tradition: Appar, Sundarar, Sambandar, and Manikkavacakar, containing forty stanzas in four different metres.
