= Nanneri =

Poem by Siva Prakasar

The Nanneri (நன்னெறி) is a Tamil poem containing forty stanzas (Venpaas), written by Siva Prakasar, who lived during the late seventeenth and early eighteenth centuries.

== Overview ==
"Nanneri" is compiled as four – four lines, which is termed as "Venpa" as per the Thamizh grammar.

The poems are a collection of venpaas, which preach about the noble qualities, which man should follow to lead a good life.

== Verses and explanation ==
Each venpa of Nanneri is generally named by the first few words of the poem. These are given first below, with an English translation:-

Verses	Explanation
கடவுள் வாழ்த்து	Obeisance to God
மின்னெறி சடாமுடி விநாயகன் அடிதொழ நன்னெறி வெண்பா நாற்பதும் வருமே.	Worshipping at the feet of God Vinayagar will bring forth the forty poems of Nannery
1.உபசாரம் கருதாமல் உதவுக என்றும் முகமன் இயம்பா தவர்கண்ணும் சென்று பொருள்கொடுப்போர் தீதற்றோர் – துன்றுசுவை பூவிற் பொலிகுழலாய் பூங்கை புகழவோ நாவிற் குதவும் நயந்து?	Good men will reach out and help the needy, Even to those who had never met them before. For, does the hand that carry food to the mouth expect it to be praised by the tongue?
2.வன்சொல்லும் இனிமையாகும் மாசற்ற நெஞ்சுடையார் வன்சொலினிது ஏனையவர் பேசுற்ற இன்சொல் பிறிதென்க – ஈசற்கு நல்லோன் எறிசிலையோ நன்னுதால் ஓண்கருப்பு வில்லோன் மலரோ விருப்பு.	The harsh words spoken by men of good-will is pleasing, But even the pleasant words by men of ill-will turn sour. For the stone aimed at the Lord with love turned into flowers, While the flower aimed at the Lord by Kaman was rejected.
3.இனிய வழியறிந்து ஒருபொருளை அடைக தங்கட்கு உதவிலர்கைத் தாமொன்று கொள்ளினவர் தங்கட்கு உரியவரால் தாங்கொள்க – தங்கநெடுங் குன்றினால் செய்தனைய கொங்காய் ஆவின்பால் கன்றினால் கொள்ப கறந்து.	If one wishes to extract any help from those who do not wish to give, Then, like a calf is used to milk a cow Use someone who could make him relent.
4.செல்வம் பயன்படுத்துவார்க்கே உரியதாம் பிறர்க்குதவி செய்யார் பெருஞ்செல்வம் வேறு பிறர்க்குதவி ஆக்குபவர் பேறாம் – பிறர்க்குதவி செய்யாக் கருங்கடல்நீர் சென்று புயல்முகந்து பெய்யாக் கொடுக்கும் பிறர்க்கு.	The wealth of those who do not give to charity will end up in the hands of those who give. The salty water in the sea is not of much use Is fetched by the clouds and delivered as rain.
5.நட்பிற்பிரியலாகாது நீக்கம் அறுமிருவர் நீங்கிப் புணர்ந்தாலும் நோக்கின் அவர்பெருமை நொய்தாகும் – பூக்குழலாய் நெல்லின் உமிசிறிது நீங்கிப் பழமைபோல் புல்லினும் திண்மைநிலை போம்.	The rice when parted from the husk that covers it Loses its ability to grow even when put together again. Similarly a friendship however long it had been going Once falls apart will not regain its previous strength.
6.தம்பதிகள் ஒற்றுமை காதல் மனையாளும் காதலனும் மாறின்றித் தீதில் ஓருகருமம் செய்பவே – ஓதுகலை எண்ணிரண்டும் ஒன்றுமதி என்முகத்தாய் நோக்கல்தான் கண்ணிரண்டும் ஒன்றையே காண்.	The loving wife and her devoted husband should always act with the same aim in life. For, the two eyes in a face though separate both see only one object at the same time.
7.கல்விச் செருக்குக் கூடாது கடலே அனையம்யாம் கல்வியால் என்னும் அடலேறு அனையசெருக்கு ஆழ்த்தி – விடலே முனிக்கரசு கையால் முகந்து முழங்கும் பனிக்கடலும் உண்ணப் படும்.	Even when one possess a vast sea of knowledge It should not give way to pride like that of a lion. For even the vast sea was picked up in his hands and drunk by Agasthiar, the king of the sages.
8.ஆறுவது சினம் உள்ளம் கவர்ந்தெழுந்து ஓங்குசினம் காத்துக் கொள்ளும் குணமே குணமென்க – வெள்ளம் தடுத்தல் அரிதோ தடடங்கரைதான் பேர்த்து விடுத்த லரிதோ விளம்பு.	It is easy to break the bund to let the water flow than building a bund to hold the flood water in. One should control one's anger than letting it flare Only then can he be called a man of good character.
9.துணையுடையார் வலிமையுடையார் மெலியோர் வலிய விரவலரை அஞ்சார் வலியோர் தமைத்தாம் மருவின் – பலியேல் கடவுள் அவிர்சடைமேல் கட்செவி யஞ்சாதே படர்சிறைஅப் புள்ளரசைப் பார்த்து	The weak will not have a fear of the strong When the weak has men of power as their allies. For the cobra sitting on the matted hair of the Lord; Does not fear its enemy, the Garuda, king of birds.
10.தன்னலம் கருதலாகாது தங்குறைதீர் வுள்ளார் தளர்ந்து பிறர்க்குறூஉம் வெங்குறைதீர்க் கிற்பார் விழுமியோர் – திங்கள் கறையிருளை நீக்கக் கருதாது உலகின் நிறையிருளை நீக்குமேல் நின்று.	The good people though themselves suffer poverty will seek to help those poorer than themselves. Like the moon though has a shadow on its surface It still shines at night to offer light to this world
11.அறிஞர் ஐம்புலன்கட்கு அடிமையாகார் பொய்ப்புலன்கள் ஐந்துநோய் புல்லியர் பாலன்றியே மெய்ப்புலவர் தம்பால் விளையாவாம் – துப்பிற் சுழன்றுகொல் கல்தூணைச் சூறா வளிபோய்ச் சுழற்றும் சிறுபுன் துரும்பு.	The storm can only throw around small items, Can it ever move a heavy pillar of granite? The pleasures of the five senses can sway only the weak It cannot make headway with people of strong will.
12.உடம்பில் உயிர் அமைந்த வியப்பு வருந்தும் உயிர்ஒன்பான் வாயில் உடம்பில் பொருந்துதல் தானே புதுமை – திருந்திழாய் சீதநீர் பொள்ளல் சிறுகுடத்து நில்லாது வீதலோ நிற்றல் வியப்பு.	Is there any surprise if water leaks From a pot that is full of holes. Likewise the surprise is not how one loses his life but how it stays in this diseased body of nine holes.
13.அன்பொடு உதவுக பெருக்க மொடுசுருக்கம் பெற்றபொருட்கு ஏற்ப விருப்பமொடு கொடுப்பர் மேலோர் – சுரக்கும் மலையளவு நின்றமுலை மாதே மதியின் கலையளவு நின்ற கதிர்.	The people of kind heart will give to others based on the rise and fall of their income. For the light shone on the earth by the moon varies with the waxing and waning of its phase.
14.செல்வச் செருக்குக் கூடாது தொலையாப் பெருஞ்செல்வத் தோற்றத்தோ மென்று தலையா யாவர் செருக்குச் சார்தல் – இலையால் இரைக்கும்வண்டு ஊதுமலர் ஈர்ங்கோதாய் மேரு வரைக்கும்வந் தன்று வளைவு.	Oh lady, wearing flowers with buzzing bees, listen! The wise will not be arrogant because they know that the wealth into which they had born may one day go. For even Mount Meru was once made to go under.
15.அன்பற்ற செல்வம் பயனற்றது இல்லானுக்கு அன்பிங்கு இடம்பொருள் ஏவல்மற்று எல்லாம் யிருந்துமவர்க் கென்செய்யும் – நல்லாய் மொழியிலார்க் கேது முதுநூல் தெரியும் விழியிலார்க்கு ஏது விளக்கு	What is the use of everything a man could possess If he does not have the love of those around him. What use is there for books to an illiterate man and what use is a lamp for the blind.
16.மேலோர் இழிந்தோர்க்கும் உதவுவார் தம்மையும் தங்கள் தலைமையையும் பார்த்துயர்ந்தோர் தம்மை மதியார் தமையடைந்தோர் – தம்மின் இழியினும் செல்வர் இடர்தீர்ப்பர் அங்கு கழியினும் செல்லாதோ கடல்.	Like the vast sea that fills small pools to make salt, Noble men at the top of society will not fail to reach out to help those who are less well off Despite the position and status they are in.
17.வள்ளல்கள் வறுமையிலும் உதவிபுரிவார்கள் எந்தைநல் கூர்ந்தான் இரப்பார்க்கீந் தென்றவன் மைந்தர்தம் ஈகைமறுப்பரோ – பைந்தொடிஇ நின்று பயனுதவி நில்லா அரம்பையின் கீழ்க் கன்றும் உதவும் கனி.	The banana tree gets destroyed once it yields its fruits. This does not stop its sapling from doing the same. A son whose father became poor by giving to charity Will not refuse to give for giving is all that he knows.
18.இன்சொல்லையே உலகம் விரும்பும் இன்சொலா லன்றி இருநீர் வியனுலகம் வன்சொலால் என்றும் மகிழாதே – பொன்செய் அதிர்வளையாய் பொங்காது அழல்கதிரால் தண்ணென் கதிர்வரவால் பொங்குங் கடல்.	The sea does not swell by the heat of the sun, But rises to welcome the cool rays of the moon. Similarly, the world rejoices at hearing pleasant words But is not happy to hear when harsh words are spoken.
19.நல்லார் வரவு இன்பம் பயக்கும் நல்லோர் வரவால் நகைமுகங்கொண் டின்புறீஇ அல்லோர் வரவால் அழுங்குவார் – வல்லோர் திருந்தும் தளிர்காட்டித் தென்றல்வரத் தேமா வருந்துங் கழற்கால் வர.	The spring season brings new shoots in a mango tree But it suffers from the hot wind that blows in summer. The host smiles at the arrival of descent guests But this turns to worry when the opposite kind comes
20.பெரியோர் பிறர் துன்பம் கண்டிரங்குவார் பெரியவர்தம் நோய்போல் பிறர்நோய்கண் டுள்ளம் எரியின் இழுதாவார் என்க – தெரியிழாய் மண்டு பிணியால் வருந்து பிறவுறுப்பைக் கண்டு கழலுமே கண்.	When other organs of the body suffers from illness The eyes weep as if it was they that suffer the pain. Similarly, when decent men see other people suffer They feel the sufferings of others as their own.
21.இலக்கணம் கல்லார் அறிவு கற்றார் அறிவுக்குமன் செல்லாது எழுத்தறியார் கல்விப்பெருக்கம் அனைத்தும் எழுத்தறிவார்க் காணின் இலையாம் – எழுத்தறிவார் ஆயும் கடவுள் அவிர்சடைமுடி கண்டளவில் வீயும் சுரநீர் மிகை.	The learning of those who lack knowledge in grammar is exposed as inadequate in the presence of the experts. It is like the mighty river Ganges hiding itself When it reaches our Lord's crown of hair.
22.அறிவுடையோர் உயர்குலத்தவர் அறிவிலார் இழிகுலத்தவர் ஆக்கும் அறிவான் அல்லது பிறப்பினால் மீக்கொள் உயர்விழிவு வேண்டற்க – நீக்க பவர்ஆர் அரவின் பருமணிகண்டு என்றும் கவரார் கடலின் கடு.	No one rejects the gem stone guarded by a snake Or drinks from the sea because it is vast. A person should be judged only by his wisdom And not by the class into which he is born.
23.மனவுறுதி விடலாகாது பகர்ச்சி மடவார் பயிலநோன்பு ஆற்றல் திகழ்ச்சி தருநெஞ்சத் திட்பம் – நெகிழ்ச்சி பெறும்பூரிக் கின்றமுலை பேதாய் பலகால் எறும்பூரக் கல்குழியுமே.	When ants crawl along a path long enough Even a rock will be etched with its route The presence of a woman if long continued Will make even a sage to lose his resolve.
24.ஓருவர்தம் நற்குணத்தையே பேசுதல் வேண்டும் உண்டு குணமிங்கு ஒருவர்க்கு எனினும்கீழ் கொண்டு புகல்வதவர் குற்றமே – வண்டுமலர்ச் சேக்கை விரும்பும் செழும் பொழில்வாய் வேம்பன்றோ காக்கை விரும்பும் கனி.	Though a man has both good and bad qualities in him The people of low mentality will only speak of the bad It is like the bees while they seek the sweet nectar The crows go for the bitter fruits of the Margosa tree.
25 மூடர் நட்புக் கூடாது கல்லா அறிவின் கயவர்பால் கற்றுணர்ந்த நல்லார் தமது கனம் நண்ணாரே – வில்லார் கணையிற் பொலியுங் கருங்கண்ணாய் நொய்தாம் புணையில் புகுமொண் பொருள்.	When a heavy object is loaded on to a float The load appears as if it is floating on water. The learned if they associate with the fools They too will be made to appear like fools.
26.உருவத்தால் சிறியவரும் அறிவினால் பெறியவராவார் உடலின் சிறுமைகண்டு ஒண்புலவர் கல்விக் கடலின் பெருமை கடவார் – மடவரால் கண்ணளவாய் நின்றதோ காணும் கதிரொளிதான் விண்ணள வாயிற்றோ விளம்பு.	A learned man cannot be judged by his stature For his knowledge may extend far beyond The sun cannot be judged by what we can see For its rays can reach far beyond what we see.
27.அறிஞர்கள் கைம்மாறு வேண்டாமல் உதவுவார்கள் கைம்மாறு உகவாமல் கற்றறிந்தோர் மெய்வருந்தித் தம்மால் இயலுதவி தாம்செய்வர் – அம்மா முளைக்கும் எயிறு முதிர்சுவை நாவிற்கு விளைக்கும் வலியனதாம் மென்று.	The learned will undergo hardship to help the needy Without seeking gratitude in return for that help. Like the teeth that chew up the hard bits in the food Without any thanks from the tongue that enjoys it.
28.அறிவுடையோர் கோபத்திலும் உதவுவார் முனிவினும் நல்குவர் மூதறிஞர் உள்ளக் கனிவினும் நல்கார் கயவர் – நனிவிளைவில் காயினும் ஆகும் கதலிதான் எட்டிபழுத்து ஆயினும் ஆமோ அறை.	The learned will help others even if they are angry The illiterate will not help even when they are happy The banana fruit can be eaten, even when unripe Can the Eddi fruit be of any use even when ripe?
29.ஆண்டவர் அடியார் எதற்கும் அஞ்சார் உடற்கு வருமிடர் நெஞ்சோங்கு பரத்துற்றோர் அடுக்கும் ஒருகோடியாக – நடுக்கமுறார் பண்ணின் புகலும் பணி மொழியாய் அஞ்சுமோ மண்ணில் புலியைமதி மான்.v	The devotee who carries the supreme Lord in his heart Will not fear the pains that are piled on his body. For the deer that appears on the moon's surface Does not fear the tiger that roams on this earth.
30.இறப்புக்குமுன் அறம்செய்க கொள்ளும் கொடுங்கூற்றம் கொல்வான் குறுகுதன்முன் உள்ளம் கனிந்தறம்செய் துய்கவே – வெள்ளம் வருவதற்கு முன்னர் அணைகோலி வையார் பெருகுதற்கண் என்செய்வார் பேசு.	It is better to redeem yourself by performing charity Before the Lord of Death appears to take your life. Can there be any use trying to stop the rush of water If no bund had been built earlier to control the floods.
31.பிறர் துன்பம் தாங்குக பேரறிஞர் தாக்கும் பிறர்துயரம் தாங்கியே வீரமொடு காக்க விரைகுவர் – நேரிழாய் மெய்சென்று தாக்கும் வியன்கோல் அடிதன்மேல் கைசென்று தாங்கும் கடிது.	Men of great wisdom will rush to protect others Even if that act may cause them distress. Like the hand that protects the body from a blow Not worrying about the pain that it will inflict.
32.பகுத்தறிவற்றவர் அறங்கள் பயன்படா பன்னும் பனுவல் பயன்தேர் அறிவிலார் மன்னும் அறங்கள் வலியிலவே – நன்னுதால் காழொன்று உயர்திண் கதவு வலியுடைத்தோ தாழென்று இலதாயின் தான்.	The value of charity is lost when performed by those who has not learned from ancient texts. How can a door be said to be strong Without a latch that keeps it closed.
33.பெரியோர்க்குப் பாதுகாப்பு வேண்டுவதில்லை எள்ளா திருப்ப இழிஞர் போற்றற்குரியர் விள்ளா அறிஞரது வேண்டாரே தள்ளாக் கரைகாப் புளதுநீர் கட்டுகுளம் அன்றிக் கரைகாப் புளதோ கடல்.	It is immoral men who need protection from slander Men of high morals do not need any such protection. For it is the pond that needs a bund to save its water Has the sea needed any such bund to keep the water.
34.அறிவுடையவர் பழிக்கு அஞ்சுவர் அறிவுடையா ரன்றி அதுபெறார் தம்பால் செறிபழியை அஞ்சார் சிறிதும் – பிறைநுதால் வண்ணஞ்செய் வாள்விழியே அன்றி மறைகுருட்டுக் கண்ணஞ்சுமோ இருளைக்கண்டு.	It is the wise, who are afraid of slander The fools are not affected by it at all. Only those who can see, fear darkness How can the blind feel the same?
35.மேன்மக்கள் அறிவுடையோரையே விரும்புவர் கற்ற அறிவினரைக் காமுறுவர் மேன்மக்கள் மற்றையர்தாம் என்றும் மதியாரே – வெற்றிநெடும் வேல்வேண்டும் வாள்விழியாய் வேண்டா புளிங்காடி பால் வேண்டும் வாழைப்பழம்.	Noble men will always welcome the learned But those opposite do not care much about them. For a banana fruit adds taste to a bowl of milk But the taste does not change added to sour milk.
36.தக்கார்கே உதவுக தக்கார்கே ஈவர் தகார்க்களிப்பார் இல்லென்று மிக்கார்க்குதவார் விழுமியோர் – எக்காலும் நெல்லுக்கு இரைப்பதே நீரன்றிக் காட்டுமுளி புலலுக்கு யிரைப்ரோ போய்.	Men of goodwill will help only those who deserve it They decline to give to those who do not deserve help. For people will toil to irrigate the paddy in the field. But who will ever go and work to irrigate the grass?
37.பெரியேர் முன் தன்னை புகழலாகாது பெரியோர் முன் தன்னைப் புனைந்துரைத்த பேதை தரியா துயர்வகன்று தாழும் – தெரியாய்கொல் பொன்னுயர்வு தீர்த்த புணர் முலையாய் விந்தமலை தன்னுயர்வு தீர்ந்தன்று தாழ்ந்து.	Bragging about oneself in the presence of noble men Will not last long as it only brings about one's downfall Even the mighty Vindhya mountain was made to dip Reducing its height by the power of sage Agasthiar
38.நல்லார் நட்பு நன்மை பயக்கும் நல்லார்செயுங் கேண்மை நாடோறும் நன்றாகும் அல்லார்செயுங் கேண்மை ஆகாதே – நல்லாய் கேள் காய்முற்றின் தின்தீங் கனியாம் இளந்தளிர்நாள் போய்முற்றின் என்னாகிப் போம்.	The friendship with good people brings only benefit But that with evil people will eventually bring harm. The unripe fruit as time passes becomes a sweet fruit. But a shoot as time goes by ends up as a dry leaf.
39.மூடர் நட்பு கேடு தரும் கற்றறியார் செய்யுங் கடுநட்பும் தாம்கூடி உற்றுழியுந் தீமைநிகழ் வுள்ளதே – பொற்றொடி சென்று படர்ந்த செழுங்கொடிமென் பூமலர்ந்த அன்றே மணமுடைய தாம்.	A friendship with the illiterates however close Cannot bring much benefit to those involved. The creeper that climbs and clings to the tree Blooms and sends its fragrance all in one day.
40.புலவர்களுக்கு அரசர்களும் ஒப்பாகார் பொன்னணியும் வேந்தர் புனையாப் பெருங்கல்வி மன்னும் அறிஞரைத்தாம் மற்றொவ்வார் – மின்னுமணி பூணும் பிறவுறுப்புப் பொன்னே அதுபுனையாக் காணும் கண்ணொக்குமோ காண்.	When compared with a king clad in gold jewels, People give more importance to men of learning. For, even though the eyes do not wear any jewels They are more important than the organs that wear them.

== Translations ==
Nanneri has been translated into various languages including English, Hindi, Kannada and Telugu.
