= Velaiyar =

Velaiya Swamigal

Personal life
- Born: Velaiyar; 10 May 1768 Kanchipuram
- Died: 17 November 1840 (aged 72) Perumathur near by Perambalur

Religious life
- Religion: Hinduism
- Philosophy: Saiva

Velaiya Swamigal, also called Velaiyar, born during the seventeenth century, was a Saivaite spiritual writer. He was born to a Tamil-speaking family in Kanchipuram, Tamil Nadu. He compiled more than seven books.

== Family background ==
Velaiyar was born in Kanchipuram (Kanchipuram) in the Thondai mandalam region of Tamil Nadu, South India into an orthodox Saiva Tamil family around the middle of the 17th century. Veliyar's father, Kumara Swamy Desikar, was an Archaka (temple priest) who has moved to Thiruvannamalai where he got married and had three sons and a daughter. Velaiyar was the third child and his siblings included Siva Prakasar, a poet, his sister Gnambikai who married Perur Santhalinga Swamigal., and Karunai Prakasar, a writer.

Velaiyar married Meenatchi Ammal and lived at Mailam near by Pommapura Aadeenam mutt. His son Sundaresanar was a writer. He died at Perumathur at the age of 72.

== Books ==
- Mayilathula
- Nallur puranam
- Mayilai thirattai mani maalai
- Ishta linga kaithala maalai
- Kumbakona Sarangathevar history as Veera singhathana puranam
- Gugai Namachivaya Desikar history as Namchivaya leelai
- Krisnanan history as Paarijatha leelai
