= Siva Prakasar =

Tamil poet and philosopher

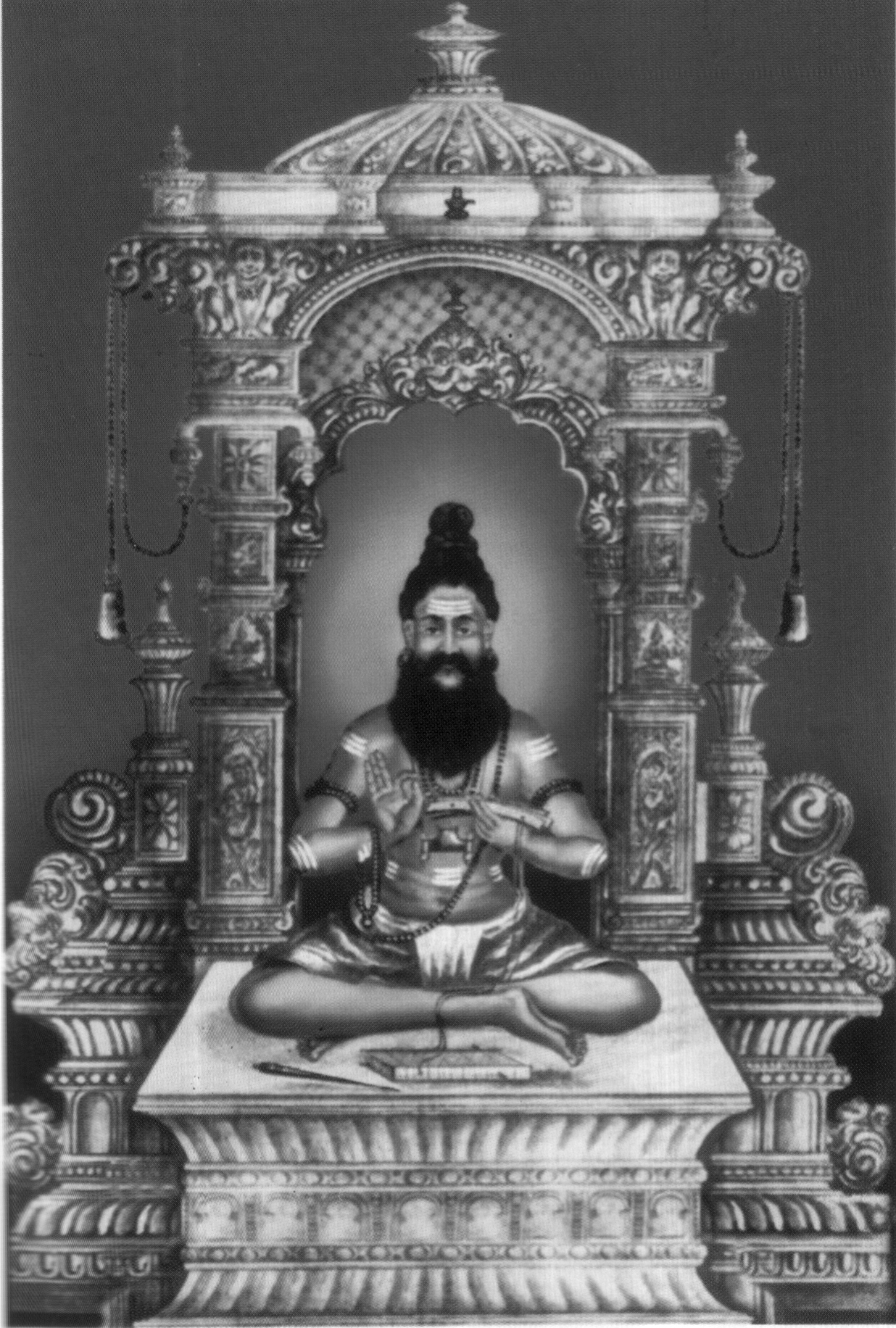
Siva Prakasa Swamigal

Siva Prakasar (also spelled Ṣiva Prakāṣa or Ṣiva-prakāṣa Dēṣikar) was a Tamil poet, scholar, and philosopher who flourished in the late 17th and early 18th centuries CE. He is often referred to by the honorific "Thurai Mangalam Śivaprakāṣar", as well as by the epithets "Karpanai Kalangiyam" and "Śivanuputhi Chelvar".

Renowned for his literary contributions, Śiva Prakāṣar authored over 34 Tamil works. His most celebrated composition, Nanneri, is a didactic text focusing on ethics and moral philosophy. He played a significant role in cross-cultural literary exchange by translating classical Kannada works into Tamil, thereby broadening their accessibility in the Tamil-speaking regions. Additionally, he gained recognition for his original poetic compositions, which blend spiritual themes with literary elegance.

His works remain influential in Tamil literature, reflecting both his philosophical depth and his commitment to preserving and enriching regional literary traditions.

== Life ==
Śiva Prakāṣar (also spelled Siva Prakasar), honored with the title "Śivanuputhichelvar" (one blessed by Śiva), was a Tamil poet-scholar renowned in the Tamil literary world as "Karpanai Kalangiyam" (Excellence of Imagination). He is noted for composing the Neerotta Yamaha Anthathi, a collection of venpa verses composed under the constraint of avoiding labial consonants (letters requiring lip contact, e.g., "m" or "p"). He also authored Yesu Matha Niragaranam (The Refutation of the Religion of Jesus), a polemical text critiquing Christian theology after debates with missionaries Roberto de Nobili and Costanzo Giuseppe Beschi (Vīramāmunivar). The latter work, however, was reportedly lost due to disputes with missionaries following Śiva Prakāṣar's victory in these debates.

== Contribution to Tamil literature ==
=== Translations ===
Śiva Prakāṣar translated the Prabhulinga Leelai (or Prabhulinga Līlai), a 15th-century Kannada Vīraśaiva text, into Tamil. The original work, composed by Chamarasa, narrates the lives and teachings of 12th-century Śivagaṇas (devotees of Śiva) such as Basava, Allama Prabhu, and Akkamahadevi through 1,111 verses. Chamarasa wrote it in response to a challenge by Vaishnava scholars to create a work surpassing the Mahābhārata and Rāmāyaṇa. Legend states he completed it in 11 days after a divine vision of Vīrabhadra (a form of Śiva). Presented at the court of Vijayanagara Emperor Devaraya II (r. 1424–1446 CE), it gained acclaim for its spiritual and literary merit. Śiva Prakāṣar's Tamil translation preserved its devotional essence while adapting it for Tamil audiences.

=== Notable poems and samples ===
Śiva Prakāṣar's works blend moral instruction, devotional fervor, and linguistic creativity. Below are excerpts from his compositions:

1. Nanneri (Moral Conduct) A didactic poem offering ethical guidance, including verses composed as marital advice for his siblings:

Verse 6: Unity of Couples

Tamil:

காதல் மனையாளும் காதலும் மாறின்றித்

தீதில் ஓருகருமம் செய்பவே – ஓதுகலை

எண்ணிரண்டும் ஒன்றுமதி என்முகத்தாய் நோக்கல்தான்

கண்ணிரண்டும் ஒன்றையே காண்.

Transliteration:

Kādal manaiyāḷum kādalum mārinrit

Tītil ōrukarumam ceypavē – ōtukalai

Eṇṇiraṇṭum onrumati enmukattāy nōkkaltān

Kaṇṇiraṇṭum onraiyē kāṇ.

Translation:

"The loving wife and devoted husband

Should act as one in purpose, free of strife.

Just as two eyes behold a single sight,

Their hearts and deeds must unite in life."

Explanation:

The verse likens marital harmony to the synchronized vision of two eyes, emphasizing unity in thought and action for a fulfilling partnership.

2. Naalvar Naan Mani Maalai (18th Verse) A devotional hymn praising the Tamil Śaiva saint Appar:

Tamil:

பாட்டால் மறைபுக ழும்பிறை சூடியைப் பாடிமகிழ்

ஊட்டா மகிழ்சொல் லிறைவனைப் பாடி உவப்புறுக்க

வேட்டால் மலிபெருங் கல்லவன்போல மிதப்பனெனப்

பூட்டா மறிதிரை வார்கடற் கேவிழப் போதுவனே

Transliteration:

Pāṭṭāl maraipuka lumpirai cūṭiyaip pāṭimakil

Ūṭṭā makilcol liraivanaip pāṭi uvappurukka

Vēṭṭāl maliperun kallavanpōla mitappanenap

Pūṭṭā maritirai vārkaṭar kēvilap pōtuvanē.

Translation:

"Singing of Śiva, whose crescent moon adorns his matted locks,

My heart swells with joy, like a stone cast into the sea,

Sinking deep into devotion’s boundless tides,

Where waves of grace forever rise and fall."

=== Tamil literary works ===
Śiva Prakāṣar authored over 30 works, including:

==== Major compositions ====
- Tiruchendil Neerotta Yamaha Anthathi
- Nanneri
- Thiruvengai Kalambagam
- Thiruvengai Kovai
- Thriuvengai Ula
- Thiruvengai Alangaram
- Thirukoova Puranam
- Seekalathi Puranam
- Periyanayaki Ammai Nedunkazhi nedilasiriya virutham
- Periyanayaki Ammai Kalithurai

==== Devotional hymns ====
- Naalvar Naan Mani Maalai
- Ittalinga Maalai
- kaithala Maalai
- Niranjana Maalai
- Sathamani Maalai
- Sona Saila Maalai
- Pitchadana Nava Mani Maalai
- Siva Nama Mahimai
- Kurunkazhi Nedil
- Nedunkazhi Nedil

==== Philosophical and polemical texts ====
- Sidhantha Sigamani
- Vendantha Soodamani
- Pazhamalai Anthathi
- Thala Venpa
- Kocha Kalippa
- Tharukka Pari Bashai
- Prabhu Linga Leelai (Translated from Kannada)
- Yesu Matha Niragaranam (The Refuting the Religion of Jesus)

==== Works on his Guru, Śivagnana Balaya Swamigal ====
- Sivaprakasa Visagam
- Sivagna Bala swamigal Thaalattu
- Sivagna Bala swamigal Thirupalli ezuchi
- Sivagna Bala swamigal Pillai Tamil
- Sivagna Bala swamigal Nenjuvedu Thoothu
- Sivagna Bala swamigal Kalambagam
