= Tamil Christian population by cities =

Amount of Tamil Christians per city in India

This is a list of the Tamil Christian population per city of Tamil Nadu, India.

Town/City	District	Country	Percent	Numbers	Year	Notes	Refs
Kanyakumari	Kanyakumari District	India	61.16%	18,202	2011		
Thoothukudi	Thoothukudi District	India	30.14%	71,681	2011		
Tirunelveli	Tirunelveli District	India	10.59%	50,158	2011		

== Districts with highest percentage of Tamil Christians as per 2011 census ==
Districts with significant percentage of Christians as per 2011 census
District	Christian (%)	Christian (numbers)
Tamil Nadu	6.12	4,418,336
Kanyakumari	47.74	876,229
Thoothukudi	18.56	3,34,908
Tirunelveli	12.06	3,64,243
The Nilgiris	11.45	87,272
Tiruchirappalli	9.46	2,49,033
Dindigul	7.87	1,70,265
Chennai	7.72	3,64,261
Ramanathapuram	6.73	92,092
Kanchipuram	6.42	2,70,416
Tiruvallur	6.29	2,49,719
Sivaganga	5.96	75,481
Coimbatore	5.6	2,01,314
Thanjavur	5.57	1,34,945
Ariyalur	4.95	37,403
Pudukkottai	4.5	72,820
Viluppuram	4.0	1,39,745
Virudhunagar	3.47	67,405
Madurai	3.22	96,352
Cuddalore	3.22	83,611
Theni	3.02	37,830
Nagapattinam	2.94	47,780
Vellore	2.83	1,12,477
Tiruppur	2.82	70,015
Tiruvannamalai	2.72	67,180
Tiruvarur	2.63	33,621
Erode	2.48	55,899
Krishnagiri	1.91	36,898
Perambalur	1.82	10,310
Salem	1.55	58,450
Karur	1.55	16,863
Namakkal	0.98	16,898
Dharmapuri	0.94	14,089

== See also ==
- Tamil population per nation
- Tamil population by cities
- States of India by Tamil speakers
- Tamil Muslim population by cities
- Tamil Loanwords in other languages
- Tamil language
- Tamil people
- List of countries and territories where Tamil is an official language
