= Tamil Muslim population by cities =

This is a list of the Tamil Muslim population per city. The population figures given are based on the number of people living within the town/city limits only.

Town/City	District	Country	Percent	Numbers	Year	Notes	Refs
Sammanthurai	Ampara District	Sri Lanka	87.00%	52,350	2012		
Kalmunai	Ampara District	Sri Lanka	98.00%	44,306	2012		
Akurana	Kandy District	Sri Lanka	99.10%	41,117	2012		
Beruwela	Kalutara District	Sri Lanka	94.10%	25,177	2012		
Kattankudy	Batticaloa District	Sri Lanka	98.01%	40,124	2012		
Akkaraipattu	Ampara District	Sri Lanka	99.00%	38,299	2012		
Pottuvil	Ampara District	Sri Lanka	93.10%	27,213	2012		
Puttalam	Puttalam District	Sri Lanka	86.02%	39,148	2012		
Irakkamam	Ampara District	Sri Lanka	95.80%	13,806	2012		
Labbaikudikadu	Perambalur District	India	93.45%	11,891	2011		
Kilakarai	Ramanathapuram District	India	79.92%	30,654	2011		
Kayalpatnam	Thoothukudi District	India	77.01%	37,418	2011		
Adirampattinam	Thanjavur District	India	72.25%	34,728	2011		
Thondi	Ramanathapuram District	India	51.68%	9,543	2011		
Ilayangudi	Sivagangai District	India	69.96%	17,328	2011		
Periyapattinam	Ramanathapuram District	India	65.15%	6,339	2011		

== See also ==
- Tamil population per nation
- Tamil population by cities
- States of India by Tamil speakers
- Tamil Christian population by cities
- Seera Puranam
- Tamil Loanwords in other languages
- Tamil language
- Tamil people
- List of countries and territories where Tamil is an official language
