= Alathur, Perambalur =

Town in Perambalur, Tamil Nadu, India

Alathur
- Neighbourhood
- Interactive map of Alathur
- Coordinates: 11.1282°N 78.8391°E
- Country: India
- State: Tamil Nadu
- District: Perambalur

Languages
  - Official: Tamil, English
  - Speech: Tamil, English
- Time zone: UTC+5:30 (IST)
- PIN: 621109
- Vehicle registration: TN - 39 ** XXXX
- Neighbourhoods: Padalur, Irur, Nattaramangalam, Pudhukkurichi
- LS: Cuddalore
- VS: Tittakudi

Alathur is a town in Alathur taluk of Perambalur district, Tamil Nadu, India. This town is the headquarters of Alathur taluk. The Postal Index Number of the town is 606303.
