= Chettikulum =

- Village
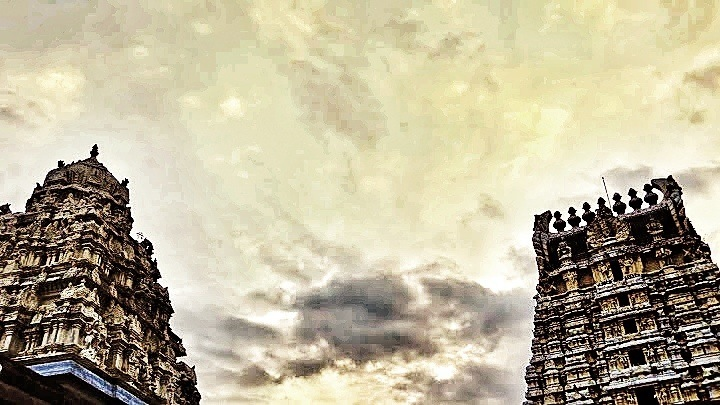

- Chettikulum, Perambalur district, Tamil Nadu
- Coordinates: 11.1366°N 78.7991°E
- Country: India
- State: Tamil Nadu
- District: Perambalur
- Elevation: 169.15 m (555.0 ft)

Languages
  - Official: Tamil
- Time zone: UTC+5:30 (IST)
- PIN: 621104
- Vehicle registration: TN-46
- Nearest city: Perambalur, Thambiranpatty

Chettikulam is a panchayat village in Perambalur district, Tamil Nadu, India. It is home to the famous Ekambareswarar and Balathandayuthapani temples.
