= Thandayuthapani Temples, Chettikulam =

Temple complex in Tamil Nadu, India

Coordinates: 11.137353°N 78.789332°E

The Thandayuthapani Temples are Hindu temples based in the village of Chettikulum (Perambalur district) in Perambalur district. The temples are dedicated to the Tamil god Dhandayuthapani and located 22 kilometres from Perambalur town on NH-45. The temples are believed to have been constructed by the Pandya king Kulasekhara. Moolavar:Dhandayuthapani Urchavar:- Amman / Thayar: - Thala Virutcham: Vilwa Theertham:Panchanadhi Agamam / Pooja :- Old year:500 years old Historical Name:- City:Chettikulam District:Perambalur State: Tamil Nadu Singers: Arunagirinathar

== Festival ==
10 day Panguni Uthiram festival in March–April with Mandakapadi and car procession each day drawing crowd in lakhs; 10 day Thaipoosam car festival; festivals to the steps of the temple on the first day of chithirai month – April–May with lamp puja for each step; Vaikasi Visakam-conch abishek with special pujas in May–June, 7 day Aipasi Skanda Sashi festival in October–November with a Laksharchana (chanting the thousand names of the Lord 100 times repeatedly) are the festivals celebrated in the temple.

== Speciality ==
The presiding deity is a swayambumurthi. On 3rd, 4th and 5th days of Masi (February–March) the rays of setting Sun fall on the deity. During the setting time, the rays will fall on the deity from foot to the face. Lord Dhandayuthapani graces here with hair in His head. The idol is 4 feet tall holding a sugarcane with 11 parting lines called kanukkal, a form nowhere available in Muruga temples.

== General Information ==
The temple has 240 steps to mount on and 243 steps to come down. The speciality of the temple is that Lord Muruga faces the other Chettikulam temple belonging to His father Lord Shiva. The chief of Muruga's army, Veerabagu graces here as Veerabadraswami.

Opening Time:The temple is open from 6.00 a.m. to 11.00 and 4.00 p.m. to 8.00 p.m. Address:Sri Dhandayuthapani Temple, Chettikulam, Perambalur district.

=== Prayers ===
People pray here for happy wedlocks, child boon, for remedy from illness and other physical problems, favourable results in litigations, recovery of things lost, trade problems etc. and they strongly believe that Lord Muruga offers just solutions. The other natural advantage is that devotees go by steps to the temple breathing the healthy herbal breeze.

=== Thanksgiving ===
Tonsuring, carrying Kavadi, offering things equal to their weight (Tulabaram), contributing cattle are the prayer commitments followed by devotees. Those getting the child boon realized, make cradles of sugarcane and tie them in the temple. Some offer Vel – the weapon of Lord Muruga- made of silver and offer it to the Lord. Abishek is offered in milk, curd, green coconut, lime fruits, sandal, panchamirtham made of five ingredients, oil etc. They perform Kalasabishekam (kalasa-small metal pots) on Sashti days – 6th day either from new moon or full moon days. Shanmuga Homa is devotionally performed by devotees. Feeding the visitors and usual abisheks are also performed by devotees.

== Greatness of Temple ==
Lord Muruga in Dhandayuthapani form has tonsured head in all temples. Against this established principle, Lord Dhandayuthapani in this temple appears in a beautiful hair style. He is 4 feet tall holding a sugarcane with 11 partition lines. This is the only temple where devotees can have this darshan.

Chettikulam: Lord Muruga granted darshan to Sage Againsthya as a bangle seller called Valayal Chetty. (Valayal-Bangle, Chetti- trader). Lord Muruga is also said to have guided Paranthaka Chola and Kulasekhara Pandiya and helped them quell the fury of Kannaki and calm her in the form of Madhurakali. The place is also known as Vadapalani as Lord Muruga graces in a form as in Palani in south.

The significance lies in the Lord's swayambumurthi form. He is holding a red sugarcane, an exclusive form here only. The Panchanadhi River is always full of water. The rain water flows into the river through the herbal plants on the hill and has all medicinal properties. The prayer commitments to Palani can be executed here. Sage Agasthya worshipped here. Saint Arunagiriar had praised the temple in his hymns.

== History ==
The Devas appealed to Lord Shiva in Kailash to protect them from the terrorism of the demons. Mother Parvathi was also present in the court. Lord Muruga rose up and promised to destroy them and got the Shakti weapon called Vel from His Mother. He returns to his Mother to announce his victory over the demons and the destruction of their chief Sura. As a token of Her congratulations to the victorious son, She gave the sugarcane held by Her. Lord Muruga came to this temple with this sugarcane. Lord Ganesha temple at the entrance was rebuilt in the year 2008 by Mr M.Ramasamy Additional Inspector General of Registration (Retd) and his wife Shakunthala Ramasamy .

== Special Features ==
Miracle Based: The presiding deity is a swayambumurthi. On 3rd, 4th and 5th days of Masi (February–March) the rays of setting Sun fall on the deity. During the setting time, the rays will fall on the deity from foot to the face
