= Tamil loanwords in other languages =

List of loanwords

There are many Tamil loanwords in other languages. The Tamil language, primarily spoken in southern India and Sri Lanka, has produced loanwords in many different languages, including Ancient Greek, Biblical Hebrew, English, Malay, native languages of Indonesia, Mauritian Creole, Tagalog, Russian, and Sinhala and Dhivehi.

== In Ancient Greek ==
Tamil loanwords in Ancient Greek came about due to the interactions of Mediterranean and South Indian merchants. Tamil loanwords entered the Greek language throughout different periods in history. Most words had to do with items of trade that were unique to South India. Although there is general consensus that there are Tamil loanwords in Ancient Greek, few of the words have competing etymologies as well.

== In Hebrew ==
Tamil loanwords in Biblical Hebrew are of particular importance in that they are the earliest attestation of the Tamil language. These words were incorporated into the writing of the Hebrew Bible starting before 500 BCE. Although a number of authors have identified many Biblical and post-Biblical words of Tamil, Old Tamil, or Dravidian origin, a number of them have competing etymologies and some Tamil derivations are considered controversial.

== In English ==
| English word | Tamil word | Transliteration | Meaning in English |
|---|---|---|---|
| Aiyo! | ஐயோ | Aiyyo! | Oh no! / Oh dear! |
| Anicut | அணைக்கட்டு | Anaikattu | anicut/dam |
| Curry | கறி | kaṟi | relish for rice |
| Catamaran | கட்டுமரம் | kattumaram | a type of boat, literally "tied logs" |
| Cheroot | சுருட்டு | suruṭṭu | roll |
| Corundum | குருந்தம்/குருவிந்தம் | kuruntham/kuruvintham | ruby |
| Mango | மாங்காய் | Maangaai | unripe mango fruit |
| Moringa | முருங்கை | Murungai | Murungagaai |
| Mulligatawny | மிளகுத்தண்ணி | miḷaku-taṇṇīr/milaguthanni | pepper water |
| Patchouli | பச்சை இலை | pachchai ilai | green leaf |
| Pandal | பந்தல் | pandhal | temporary shelter |
| Pariah | பறையர் | Paraiyar | outcast |
| Ginger | இஞ்சி வேர் | Inji ver | ginger root |

== In Malay (including Malaysian and Indonesian) ==
Interaction between Tamil speakers and Malay speakers has been established from ancient time. Tamil influence has been around such as Palava usage as ancient script in Indonesia (Palava dynasty was existed on 275 CE–897 CE) and Chola invasion of Srivijaya in 1025.

Tamil mainly entered the lexicon of Classical Malay (and by extension, its modern Malaysian and Indonesian standard variants) with the immigration of South Indian traders and labourers who settled around the Strait of Malacca. Henceforth, loanwords from Tamil, while also an Indian language (though not Indo-European like Sanskrit), mainly exist in the fields of commerce and cuisine, the latter like Chinese and unlike Sanskrit. See also Wiktionary:Appendix:Malay words of Tamil origin.

| Malay word | Malay meaning | Tamil Word | Tamil Transliteration | Tamil Meaning | Note |
|---|---|---|---|---|---|
| acaram | 1. ring, 2. earnest money | அச்சகாரம் | accāram | earnest money | |
| acu | mould, model | அச்சு | accu | mould | |
| andai | if, suppose | அண்டை | aṇṭai | near, support | |
| apam | kind of cake, hoppers | அப்பம் | appam | appam, rice cake, bread pastry | |
| badai | storm | வாடை | vāṭai | wind, north wind | |
| bagai | sort of | வகை | vakai | kind, sort | |
| baji | wedge | வசி | vaci | cleft, point, edge | |
| basi | 1. commission, fee 2. overtime or extra pay 3. reduction (in price), discount | வாசி | vāci | 1. difference 2. rate, as of interest; portion 3. discount, in changing money | |
| batil | copper bowl, plate, tray | வட்டில் | vaṭṭil | a brass tray, a platter; basket | |
| bedil | gun, rifle | வெடி | veṭi | explosion, as of gun | via Javanese bedhil |
| bendi | okra/lady's finger | வெண்டி | vendi | okra | |
| bicu | lever | வீச்சு | vīccu | blow, stroke | |
| biram | 1. elephant, 2. double-headed snake, 3. red | வேழம் | vēḻam | elephant | |
| canai | grindstone | சாணை | cāṇai-k-kal | grindstone | |
| cemeti | whip | சம்மட்டி | cammaṭṭi | 1. (horse-)whip, 2. large hammer | |
| cerpelai | mongoose (Herpestes sp.) | கீரிப்பிள்ளை | kīri-p-piḷḷai | common Indian mungoose, Indian ichneumon, Herpestes mungo | |
| cerpu | leather sandals (terompah-like) | செருப்பு | ceruppu | leather sandals, slippers, shoes | |
| cerutu, cerut, serutu | cigar | சுருட்டு | curuṭṭu | 1. curling, coiling; 2. cigar | |
| ceti | money lender | செட்டி | ceṭṭi | mercantile caste, traders | from Prakrit sēṭṭišrēṣṭhin |
| cukai | excise tax, custom | சுங்கம் | cuṅkam | duty on goods, customs, tolls | from Prakrit šuṅkašulka |
| cuku | dried gambier roots | சுக்கு | cukku | dried ginger | |
| cuma | only, no others | சும்மா | cummā | leisurely, without any occupation or work | ? |
| gula | sugar | குளம் | kuḷam | sugar | *? |
| gulai | kind of curry | குலை | gulai | | *? |
| gundu | marbles | குண்டு | kuṇṭu | ball; anything globular and heavy | |
| gurindam | two lines rhyme | கிரந்தம் | kirantam | 1. book, treatise 2. A verse or prose containing 32 syllables, šlōka | from grantha. |
| helai | sheet | இலை | ilai | leaf, petal | |
| jodoh, joli | mate, partner | சோடி | cōṭi | couple, pair | loanword from Hind. jōḍi. |
| joli | royal sedan | டோலி | ṭōli | a kind of sedan | loanword from Hind. ḍōlā. |
| kambi | wooden frames to strengthen the edges of doors | கம்பி | kampi | wall plate | |
| kapal | boat | கப்பல் | kappal | ship, sailing vessel | |
| kari, kare | curry | கறி | kaṟi | curry | Latter is Indonesian spelling |
| katai, katik | small, short | கடை | kaṭṭai | short, low, dwarfish defect, deficiency | |
| katelum | bastion | கொத்தளம் | kottalam | part of a rampart, bastion, defensive erection on the top of a rampart | from Pāli koṭṭhaka |
| kati | a measure of weight = 6¼ ons | கட்டி | kaṭṭi | a measure of weight = 25 palams | |
| katik | 1. Paspalum scrobiculatum, 2. Treron curvirostra, 3. area measurement (of land or field) | கட்டை | kaṭṭai | mile | |
| katil | bed | கட்டில் | kaṭṭil | 1. cot, bedstead, couch, sofa, 2. Throne | |
| kawal | guard, escourt | காவல் | kāval | defence, protection, watchman, guard | |
| kedai | shop, foodstall | கடை | kaṭai | bazaar, shop, market | |
| kedelai | Glycine max | கடலை | kaṭalai | Cicer arietinum, Melastoma malabaricum | Kanarese, Travancore usage kaḍale, Malayalam kaḍala Malaysian and Singaporean Malay tends to use the Dutch loan soya instead. |
| keledai | Equus asinus | கழுதை | kaḻutai | Equus asinus | |
| ketumbar | Coriandrum sativum | கொத்தமல்லி | kottamalli | Coriandrum sativum | from Sanskrit कुस्तुम्बुरु (kustumburu) |
| kodi | twenty units | கோடி | kōṭi | 1. Crore, ten millions, 2. large number | |
| kolam | pool, pond, basin, tank | குளம் | kuḷam | tank, pond, reservoir, lake | |
| konde, kundai | dressing of hair in large coil on the head | கொண்டை | koṇṭai | tuft, dressing of hair in large coil on the head | related to Telugu koṇḍe, Kanarese Travancore goṇḍe, Malayalam koṇṭa |
| korundum | natural Aluminum oxide | குருந்தம் | kuruntam | corundum, emery | |
| kudai | basket made of rattan | கூடை | kūṭai | basket made of rattan, ola or bamboo | |
| kuil | temple (esp. Hindu ones) | கோயில் | kōyil | 1. palace, 2. temple, sanctuary | |
| kulai | limp | குலை | kulai | to untie, loosen, dishevel | |
| kuli | physical worker | கூலி | kūli | 1. wages, pay; 2. fare, hire, freight | |
| kundi | clay craftsman | | kuṉṟi | | ? |
| ladam | horseshoe | லாடம் | lāṭam | horseshoe | |
| lebai | mosque employees | லப்பை | lappai | Tamil-speaking Muslims | |
| logam | metal | உலோகம் | ulōkam | metal | from lōha metal |
| madali | a musical instrument | மத்தளம் | mattaḷam | a kind of drum | |
| malai | strands, garland | மாலை | mālai | anything strung together | |
| mahligai, maligai | royal chamber in palace | மாளிகை | māḷikai | top floor of a storied building | ? |
| mangga | mango | மாங்காய் | māṅkāy | mango | |
| manik | beads | | maṇi | | |
| manikam | diamond | மாணிக்கம் | māṇikkam | gem, precious stone | |
| mendikai, tembikai | watermelon | கொம்மட்டிக்காய் | kommaṭṭikkāy | watermelon, cucumber | latter is metathesis of former |
| merikan, marikan | clothes from America | மரிக்கன் | marikkaṉ | from America | |
| maru | disturbing ghost | மாற்று | māṟṟu | to change, alter to conceal, hide to shift; to transfer, as from a place | |
| matu | grade of gold | மாற்று | māṟṟu | degree of fineness of gold or silver | |
| mempelam | mango | மாம்பழம் | mā-m-paḻam | mango fruit | |
| merunggai, remunggai | Moringa oleifera | முருங்கை | muruṅkai | Moringa pterygosperma | latter is metathesis of former |
| metai | bed | மெத்தை | mettai | bed, cushion | |
| meterai | seal, stamp | முத்திரை | muttirai | 1. impress, mark 2. seal, signet 3. stamp, as for postage, for court fees | |
| misai | mustache | மீசை | mīcai | 1. upper part, 2. cf. šmašru. moustache | |
| modal | capital, stock | முதல் | mutal | 1. beginning 2. principal, fund, capital, money yielding interest 3. stock, store | |
| mundam | large tub for royal bathing | முந்தை | muntai | small vessel | |
| mutu | 1. quality, purity of gold 2. sad 3. In pinch (chess) | முட்டு | muttu | difficulty, as in passing, hindrance, obstacle, impediment | |
| nali | volume unit =16 gantang =1/50 koyan | நாழி | nāḻi | tubularity; tube, a measure of capacity, =8 ollocks | related to nāḍi |
| nelayan | fisherman | நுளையன், கரையான், வலையன், வலைஞன் | nuḷaiyaṉ, karaiyāṉ, valaiyaṉ, valaiñaṉ, | fisher(man) | |
| nila | indigo | நீல | nila | blue, black, common indigo, blue nelumbo | |
| nilai | value | நிலை | nilai | standing character, quality, temper, nature | |
| nilakandi | indigo (color, stone): blue vitriol | நீலகண்டன் | nīla-kaṇṭaṉ | blue vitriol | |
| nilam | Pycnonotus aurigaster, Pogostemon cablin | நீலம் | nīlam | blue, azure or purple colour | |
| ondé-ondé | 1. jian dui (Java); 2. klepon (Sumatra and Malay Peninsula) | உண்டை | uṇṭai | ball, globe, sphere; anything round or globular | |
| panai | wooden tray | பானை | pāṉai | 1. large earthen pot or vessel 2. measure of capacity 3. oil measure = 4 cempu | |
| pancalogam | alloy | பஞ்சலோகம் | pañcalōkam | 1. The five kinds of metal, poṉ, irumpu, cempu, īyam, veḷḷi; 2. Amalgam of the five metals | |
| pandam | resin (in the grip of keris) | பண்டம் | pantam | 1. substance, material, utensils.; 2. belly, body | from bhāṇḍa |
| pandu | 1. guide 2. to drive | பந்து | pantu | relation, kinsman | from bandhu. |
| patam, petam | ornament, jewelry | பட்டம் | paṭṭam | plate of gold worn on the forehead, as an ornament or badge of distinction | |
| pawai | 1. parade, procession 2. royal equipments | பவனி | pavaṉi | parade | |
| pelbagai | various | 1. பல; 2. வகை | 1. pala 2. vakai | 1. many 2. division, class, manner, way, nature, goods, places, detail | |
| perisai | shield | பரிசை | paricai | 1. shield, buckler (come from phara); 2. large umbrella, as a badge of honour | |
| perli | satire, mockery | புரளி | puraḷi | 1. lying, falsehood; 2. mischief, waggishness; 3. quarrel, wrangle, broil; | |
| peta | map | படம் | paṭaṁ | map | |
| peti | chest, box | பெட்டி | peṭṭi | chest, trunk, coffer, box | |
| pitam | headache, dizziness | பித்தம் பித்தம் | pittam pitta | lunacy, madness dizziness | |
| puadai | red carpet | பாவாடை | pāvāṭai | red carpet | |
| pualam | marble | பவளம் | pavaḷam | red coral | |
| pudi | small diamond | பொடி | poṭi | small gem | |
| putu | kue putu | புட்டு | puṭṭu | puttu | |
| ragam | variety, trait, character | ராகம் | (i)rākam | desire, color, redness, music | |
| roti | bread | ரொட்டி | roṭṭi | bread, wheaten cake | |
| sambal | sambal | சம்பாரம் | campāram | spicy condiments, curry stuff | 1. from Sanskrit सम्बार (sambāra) 'spices'.; 2. related to sambar (சாம்பார் cāmpār) |
| satai, saté | satay | சதை | catai | flesh | |
| sedelinggam | red paint material | சாதிலிங்கம் | cātiliṅkam | cermilion, red sulphurate of mercury | |
| senam | calisthenics | சானம் சனம் | cāṇam caṉam | meditation (dhyāna) people, crowd, herd | |
| sengketa | to dispute, to antagonize | ஸங்கடம் | saṅkaṭam | trouble | |
| talam | tray without feet | தாலம் | tālam | 1. eating- plate, porringer, usually of metal.; 2. Salver | |
| tampah | tray | தம்பா | tampā | tray | see tatak |
| tambi | 1. younger brother (Indian); 2. helper | தம்பி | tampi | younger brother (Indian) | |
| tandil | overseer | தண்டல் | taṇṭal | tax-collector | |
| tandu | palanquin | தண்டு | taṇṭu | pole of a palanquin or other vehicle | |
| tembaga | copper | செம்பு | cempu | copper, gold, metal vessel | |
| teman | friend | தமன் | tamaṉ | friend (male) | |
| terusi, tursi | blue vitriol | துருசு | turucu | blue vitriol | |
| tirai | curtain | திரை | tirai | curtain | |
| tolan, taulan | friend | தோழன் | tōlan | friend (male) | |
| topi | hat | தொப்பி | toppi | cap | |
| tunai | cash | துணை | tuṇai | measure, extent, degree, quantity, number | ? |
| undi | vote, lots | உண்டை | uṇṭai | ball, globe, sphere; anything round or globular | |
| Wéda | Vēdas | வேதம் | vētam | Vēdas | |

== In Mauritian Creole ==
| Creole | Tamil | Meaning |
|---|---|---|
| Kali | Kalli | Name of a plant |
| Notchi | Notchi | Name of a plant |
| Mourouk (Muruku) | Murungai | Name of a tree |
| Vetivert | Vettiver | Name of a plant |
| Att | Atta | Name of a fruit |
| Goyave | Koyyu | Name of a fruit |
| Pipangaye | Peerkanggaye | Name of a vegetable |
| Mourroung | Murungai (முருங்கை) | Moringa |
| Patol | Pudol | Name of a vegetable |
| Avrayka | Avaraykaye | Name of a vegetable |
| Kotaranga | Kottuvarangaye | Name of a vegetable |
| Kotomili | Kottumalli | Name of a vegetable |
| Karoupillay | Karuvepilay | Name of a vegetable |
| Betel | Vettrilaye | Name of a vegetable |
| Pak | Paku | Name of a vegetable |
| Putu | Pittu | Name of a cake |
| Ounday | Ourounday | Name of a cake |
| Mourkou | Mouroukkou | Name of a snacks |
| Ayo! | Ayyo! | |

== In Tagalog ==
Close contact through commercial networks between India and Maritime Southeast Asia for more than two millennia, bolstered by the establishment of Tamil as a literary language in India starting from the 9th century, allowed the spread of Dravidian loanwords in several local languages of Southeast Asia, including Old Malay and Tagalog. A list of Tagalog words with Tamil origins are shown below.

| Tagalog | Tamil | Meaning in Tamil | Meaning in Tagalog |
|---|---|---|---|
| Bagay | வகை (Vagai) | Kind, class, sort; goods; property; means of livelihood | Thing; object; article |
| Baril | வெடில் (Veḍil) | Explosion | Gun; to shoot (with a gun) |
| Bilanggo | விலங்கு (Vilaṅgu) | Fetters; shackles; manacles | Captive; prisoner |
| Gulay | குழை (Kulai) | To become soft, pulpy, as well-cooked | Vegetable |
| Kalikam | காரிக்கம் (kārikkam) | Unbleached plain cotton cloth | Embroidered breeches from Brunei |
| Kawal | காவல் (Kāval) | Watchman; guard | Soldier; warrior |
| Kawali | குவளை (Kuvaḷai) | Wide-mouthed vessel; cup | Frying pan, skillet |
| Kiyapo | கயப்பு (Kayappū) | Aquatic flower | Pistia stratiotes |
| Mangga | மாங்காய் (Māngāi) | Unripe mango fruit | Mango (in general) |
| Malunggay | முருங்கை (Murungai) | Moringa oleifera | Moringa oleifera |
| Misay | மீசை (Mīcai) | Moustache | Moustache |
| Palisay | பரிசை (Paricai) | Shield; buckler | Shield used in warrior dances |
| Puto | புட்டு (Puttu) | A kind of confectionery | Rice cake |

== In Réunion Creole ==
| Creole | Tamil | Meaning | English word |
|---|---|---|---|
| rougail | ஊறுகாய் | Pickled fruits | Pickles |

== In Russian ==
| Russian | Tamil | Meaning | English word |
|---|---|---|---|
| катамаран | கட்டு மரம் | tied logs | Catamaran |

== In Sinhala ==
Sinhala words of Tamil origin came about as part of the more than 2,000 years of language interactions between Sinhala and Tamil in the island of Sri Lanka, as well as through Dravidian substratum effect on the Sinhala Language.

=== In Sinhala words ===
In the following list, Tamil words are romanised in accordance with Tamil spelling. This results in seeming discrepancies in voicing between Sinhala words and their Tamil counterparts. Sinhala borrowing, however, has taken place on the basis of the sound of the Tamil words; thus, the word ampalam, [ambalam], logically results in the Sinhala spelling ambalama, and so forth. However, the Tamil language used here for comparison is Tamil as spoken in Sri Lanka.

| Sinhala transliteration | Meaning | Tamil transliteration | Meaning | Type |
|---|---|---|---|---|
| akkā | Elder sister | akkā | Elder sister | Kinship |
| ambalama | Way-side rest | ambalam | Public place | Daily |
| ämbäṭṭayā | Barber | ampaṭṭaṉ | Barber | Trade |
| āṃgāṇiya | Stall (in a market) | aṅgāṭi | Market | Trade |
| ānā | Man | ān | Man | Daily |
| āṇḍuva | Government | āṇṭāṉ | Rich man with many servants | Administration |
| appā | Father (regional/colloquial) | appā | Father | Kinship |
| āppa | Hoppers | āppam | Hoppers | Food |
| araliya | Oleander | araḷi | Oleander | Botany |
| avariya | Indigo plant | avuri | Indigo plant | Botany |
| ayyā | Elder brother | aiyā (see also Ayya) | Sir, father | Kinship |
| bā | Come | vā | Come | Daily |
| caṇḍiyā | Bandit, rowdy | saṇdiyar | Bandit | Daily |
| cīttaya | Chintz | cīttai | Chintz | Trade |
| ediriya | Opposition, hostility | edhiri | Opponent, enemy | Military |
| galkaṇḍuva | Sugar-candy | kaṟkaṇdu | Sugar-candy | Food |
| iccāva | Flattery | iccakam | Flattery | Daily |
| iḍama | Site, land | idam | Place, site | Construction |
| īḷa | Asthma | īḷai | Asthma | Daily |
| ilakkaya | Target | ilakku | Target | Military |
| ilakkama | Number | ilakkam | Number | Trade |
| iḷandāriyā | Young man | iḷandāri | Young man | Daily |
| iḷavuva | Death, funeral | iḻavu | Death | Daily |
| iraṭṭa | Double, even number | iraṭṭai | Double, even number | Trade |
| īyam | Lead | īyam | Lead | Daily |
| jāḍiya | Jar | cāṭi | Jar | Daily |
| jōḍuva | Pair | jōdi/cōdi | Pair | Daily |
| hodi | Gravy | soti | | Daily |
| kaḍalē | Chickpea | kadalai (paruppu) | Chickpea | Food |
| kaḍasarakkuva | Spice, curry stuffs | kadai + sarakku | Shop + Goods | Trade |
| kaḍaya | Shop | kadai | Shop | Trade |
| kaḍinama | Haste | kathi | speed | Daily |
| kaḍiyāḷama | Bridle | kadivāḷam | Bridle | Military |
| kaṃkāṇiyā | Overseer | kaṅkāṇi | Foreman | Administration |
| kalanda | A small measure of weight | kaḻañcu | Weight of 1.77 grams | Trade |
| kalavama | Mixture, blend | kalavai | Mixture | Daily |
| kālaya | Quarter | kāl | Quarter | Trade |
| kaḷudäävā | Donkey | kaḻudai | Donkey | Daily |
| kambiya | Wire | kambi | Wire | Trade |
| kaṇisama | Size | kaṇisam | Size, amount | Daily |
| kaṇṇāḍiya | Mirror, spectacles | kaṇṇāadi | Mirror, spectacles | Daily |
| kappama | Tribute | kappam | Tribute | Military |
| kappara | Small ship | kappal | Ship | Trade |
| kappi | Grit, bruised grain | kappi | Coarse grits in flour | Daily |
| kappiya | Pulley | kappi | Pulley | |
| kāvala | Protection | | | |
| kayippu | Catechu | | | |
| kayitālama | A small type if cymbal | | | |
| kāppuva | Bracelet | kāappu | Bangle | Daily |
| kärapottā | Cockroach | karappaāṉ | Cockroach (SL) | Daily |
| karavaḷa | Dried fish | karuvāadu | Dried fish | Food |
| kāsiya | Coin | kāasu | Small change, coin | Trade |
| kasippu | Illicit liquor | kacippu | Illicit liquor | Trade |
| kaṭṭumarama | Catamaran | kaṭṭumaram | Catamaran | Trade |
| kayiyeliya | Cloth with coloured border | kaili | Multicoloured cloth worn by Muslims | Daily |
| keṇḍa | Calf | keṇdai(kkāl) | Calf | Daily |
| keṇḍiya | Pitcher | keṇṭi | Pitcher | Daily |
| kiṭṭu | Close, near | kiṭṭa | Close, near | Daily |
| koḍiya | Flag | kodi | Flag | Administration |
| kollaya | Plunder, pillage | koḷḷai | Plunder | Military |
| kombuva | Name of the sign ෙ | kombu (lakaram) | Name of the sign ள | Daily |
| kōn | Part of a name | kōṉ(ar) | Name pertaining to members of the Iṭaiyar caste ("shepherd, king") | Personal name |
| kōṇama | A loin cloth for men | kōvaṇam | A loin cloth for men | Daily |
| koṇḍaya | Plait/bun of hair | koṇdai | Bun/plait of hair | Daily |
| kottamalli | Coriander | koṭhamalli | Coriander | Botany |
| koṭṭaya | Pillow | koṭṭai | Nut, round shape, pillow | Daily |
| kōvila | Hindu temple | kōyil | Temple | Daily |
| kūḍama | Shed, Resthouse | | | Daily |
| kuḍaya | Umbrella | kudai | Umbrella | Daily |
| kūḍaya | Basket | koodai | Basket | Daily |
| kūḍuva | Nest, cage | koodu | Nest, small box | Daily |
| kulala/kuḷala | Pipe | kuḻal | Tube, musical pipe | Daily |
| kulappuva | Confusion | kuḻappu- | to confuse | Military |
| kūlama | Pond | kulam- | Pond | Agricultural Term |
| kurumbā | Young coconut | kurumbai | Young coconut | Food |
| kuliya | Rent | kooli | Rent, pay | Administration |
| kuṭṭama | A Pair | | | Daily |
| machan | Term of endearment along males | | | Daily |
| Malaya | Hill country | malai | Hill | Place name |
| māmā. | Maternal uncle | māmā | Maternal uncle | Kinship |
| marakkalaya | Boat, Ethnic Moor, Sampan | marakkalam | (Sailing) Boat | Fishing |
| massinā | Brother-in-law | machiṉaṉ | Brother-in-law | Kinship |
| mayil | Fur, any hair other than on the head/face | | | Daily |
| mella | Gentle, tame, obedient | | | Daily |
| mudala | Money | mudhal | Capital | Trade |
| mudalāli | Merchant, owner of a shop | mudhalāḷi | Merchant | Trade |
| mudali | Part of a name | mudhaliyār | Name of a caste | Personal name |
| muḍukkuva | Narrow street, slum | | | Daily |
| mulu | whole, entire | | | Daily |
| muranḍu | Obstinate, wanting to fight | | | Daily |
| muruṃgā | "Drumsticks", the edible fruits of the Drumstick tree (Moringa oleifera) | muruṅgai | Horse-radish tree | Food |
| mūḍiya | lid | | | Daily |
| mūṭṭi | Earthen cooking pot | | | Daily |
| mūṭṭuva | bale/bagful | | | Daily |
| nāḍagama | Stage-play | naādagam | Drama, stage-play | Culture |
| nōṃjal, nōṃcal | feeble, unsteady | | | Daily |
| naṃgī | Younger sister | naṅgai | Young girl | Kinship |
| nōnḍi, nonḍi | lame | | | Daily |
| nūla | String/Thread | | | Daily |
| oppuva | Proof | oppu | | Administration |
| ottē | Odd number | otṟai | Odd number | Trade |
| ottuva | Espionage | otṟu | Espionage | Administration |
| padakkama | Medal | padhakkam | Medal | Administration |
| pāḍama | Lesson | pāadam | Lesson | Culture |
| paḍiya | Wage | paṭi | Extra pay | Administration |
| pālama | Bridge | pāalam | Bridge | Construction |
| paḷiya | Revenge | paḻi | Guilt, revenge | Daily |
| palliya | Church/Mosque | palli | Church/Mosque | Daily |
| pandalama | Bower, shady place | pandhal | Bower, shady place | Daily |
| peruṃkāyam | Asafoetida | | Asafoetida | Daily |
| parippu | Lentils | paruppu | Lentils | Food |
| piṭṭu | A rice dish | piṭṭu | A rice dish | Food |
| poḍi | Small, little | podi | Small | Daily |
| poṭṭuva | Bindi | pottu | | Daily |
| poraya | Fight | pōr | Fight | Military |
| pūccama | Boast, brag | | | Daily |
| pullē | Part of a name | Pillai | Part of a name (originally a Hindu title) | Personal name |
| pūṇa nūla | Sacred string/cord that Brahmins wear over their shoulder | poo-nool | | Daily |
| saiva, sāiva | Shivaite | | | Daily |
| salli | Money | salli | Coin | Trade |
| saṇḍuva | Fight | saṇdai | Fight | Military |
| sekkuva | Oil mill | | | Daily |
| sembuva | Small metal pot | | | Daily |
| seṃkamālaya | jaundice | | | Daily |
| sereppuva | Sandals | seruppu | Sandals | Daily |
| sotti | Crippled, deformed | sothhai | Emaciated person, defect | Daily |
| suruṭṭuva | Cigar | suruṭṭu | Cigar | Daily |
| takkāli | Tomato | thakkaāḷi | Tomato | Food |
| talluva | A push | thaḷḷu- | To push | Daily |
| tambiyā | Derogatory term for a Muslim man | tambi | Younger brother | Daily |
| täpäl | Postal | tabaāl | Postal, mail | Administration |
| tarama | Size, position, quantity | tharam | Quality, sort | Trade |
| taṭṭa | Bald | thaṭṭai | Baldness | Daily |
| tāliya | A necklace signifying marriage | | | Daily |
| tāttā | Father | thāathaā | Grandfather | Kinship |
| tōḍuva | A hollow cylindrical earring | | | Daily |
| tunḍuva | bit/scrap | | | Daily |
| uḍäkkiya | A narrow drum | udukkai | A narrow drum | Daily |
| udavva | Help | udhavi | Help | Daily |
| ulukkuva | Sprain (of a joint) | suḷukku | Sprain | Daily |
| ūḷiyama | Tax payable by foreigners | ooḻiyam | Service | Administration |
| uraya | Covering/Case | urai | cover | Daily |
| urumaya | Rights/heritage | urimai | Rights/heritage | Administration |
| vaṭṭiya | Type of shallow basket | | | Daily |
| veri | Drunk | veṟi | intention, madness | Daily |

=== In Sinhala verbs ===
Several verbs have been adopted into Sinhala from the Tamil language. The vast majority of these are compound verbs consisting of a Tamil origin primary verb and a Sinhala origin light verb.

| Sinhala | Sinhala transliteration | Meaning | Tamil transliteration | Meaning |
|---|---|---|---|---|
| ඉරනවා | iranavā | To tear | | |
| කිට්ටු වෙනවා | kiṭṭu venavā | To get close, to near | kitta varai | |
| කොල්ල කරනවා | kolla karanavā | To plunder | | |
| නෝන්ඩි වෙනවා | nōnḍi venavā | To be humiliated/embarrassed | | |
| පරක්කු වෙනවා | parakku venavā | To be late/delayed | | |
| පත්තු කරනවා | pattu karanavā | To light, to set on fire | patṟu- | To catch fire |
| පේරු වැටෙනවා | pēru väṭenavā | To fall to someone by chance | pēṟu | Luck ll |
| පේරු වැටෙනවා | poḍi venavā | To be crushed/crumpled | | |
| පූට්ටු කරනවා | pūṭṭu karanavā | To splice, to fasten together | | |
| තල්ලු කරනවා | tallu karanavā | To push | thaḷḷu- | To push |
| තට්ටු කරනවා | taṭṭu karanavā | To knock | thaṭṭu- | |
| | udav karanavā | To help | | |
| වෙඩි කනවා | veḍi kanavā | To have been shot | vedi | Shot, dynamite |
| වෙඩි තියනවා | veḍi tiyanavā | To shoot, to fire | vedi | Shot, dynamite |
| වෙරි වෙනවා | veri venavā | To become drunk | veri | |

== See also ==
- Wiktionary:Appendix:Malay words of Tamil origin
- List of countries and territories where Tamil is an official language
- Tamil population by cities
- Tamil population per nation
- Tamil language
- Tamil people
- Tamilisation
