= Arumbavur =

- Town panchayat
- Nickname: Wood Carvings City
- Location in Tamil Nadu, India
- Coordinates: 11.38°N 78.73°E
- Country: India
- State: Tamil Nadu
- District: Perambalur
- Named for: Arumbavur Wood Carvings

Area
  - Total: 22.60 km^{2} (8.73 sq mi)
- Elevation: 170 m (560 ft)

Population (2011)
  - Total: 12,467
  - Density: 551.6/km^{2} (1,429/sq mi)

Languages
  - Official: Tamil
- Time zone: UTC+5:30 (IST)
- PIN Code: 621103
- Vehicle registration: TN 46

Arumbavur is a Town Panchayat at Veppanthattai Taluk in Perambalur district in the state of Tamil Nadu, India. The Arumbavur Town Panchayat is divided into 15 Wards (Ward No. 1 to Ward No. 15) for which the elections are held every 5 years. According to 2011 Census, there are total 3,452 families residing in the Arumbavur [TP]. Arumbavur is popularly renowned for Wooden Carvings (Handmade) worldwide. The 500 years old Arumbavur Wooden Carving artisans have their origin traced from Madurai. The Artisans' unique specialities is to hand carve the Wooden Statues, Natural figures, House Main Doors, Pooja Doors, Pooja Mandapas, Wall Panels, Pillars, Wall Brackets, Temple Doors, Temple Cars(Thaer), Ratham, Vaaganam, Church Wall Panels etc., which are manufactured and exported to various parts of the World. The Arumbavur wooden carvings has been granted Geographical Indication tag for its distinctiveness and quality.

== Geography ==
Arumbavur is located at 11.38°N 78.73°E. It has an average elevation of 170 metres (560 ft).It is surrounded by pachamalai hills in the South and West. Arumbavur is located 26 km towards north from District Headquarters - Perambalur, 13 km from the taluk Veppanthattai and nearly 300 km from the State capital Chennai.

== Demographics ==
According to 2011 census, Arumbavur Town Panchayat covering an area of 22.60 square kilometres had a population of 12,467 with a sex ratio of 1014 females for every 1000 males, much above the national average of 929. Male and Female population counted to 6,191 and 6,276 respectively. A total of 1,211 were under the age of 6 (which is 9.71% of total population of Arumbavur [TP]), of which Males constitute 648 and females 563. Arumbavur has an average Literacy rate of 75.92%, a bit higher than the national average of 74.0%; with 83.85% of the males and 68.23% of females literate.

== Education ==
The schools currently running at this location are

- Primary Schools at Arumbavur and A. Mettur
- Government Higher Secondary School
- Shanthiniketan Matriculation Higher Secondary School
- Swami Vivekananda Matriculation Higher Secondary School
- Sri Raghavendra Higher Secondary School
- Swami Vivekananda Polytechnic College
- Galaxy nursery and primary school

== Hospitals ==
- Government Primary Health Care - Arumbavur
- Dr. K. Gopal Nursing Home
- G.V. Hospitals
- The Best Hospital (Dr. A. Ananda Moorthy)

== Police Station ==
- Arumbavur Police Station (The only station for surrounding villages like Poolambadi, Periammapalayam, Malayalapatti, Kottarakundru, Thaluthalai, Thalai Nagar, Vengalam, Krishnapuram, Venganur, Thondamanthurai etc.,)
