= Ekambareswarar Temple =

Ekambareswarar Temple may refer to several Hindu temples in India:

- Ekambareswarar Temple, Chennai, in Tamil Nadu
- Ekambareswarar Temple, Chettikulam, in Tamil Nadu
- Ekambareswarar Temple (Kanchipuram), in Tamil Nadu
- Kamakshi Ekambareshwarar Temple, in Trivandrum, Kerala

== See also ==
- Ekambareswarar–Valluvar Temple, Chennai, Tamil Nadu, India
