= Padalur =

- Village
- Location in Tamil Nadu, India Padalur (India)
- Coordinates: 11.03°N 78.88°E
- Country: India
- State: Tamil Nadu
- District: Perambalur
- Elevation: 129.01 m (423.3 ft)

Population
  - Total: 8,150 (2,011 Census)

Languages
  - Official: Tamil
- Time zone: UTC+5:30 (IST)
- PIN: 621109
- Telephone code: 04328
- Vehicle registration: TN 46
- Nearest city: Trichy, Perambalur
- Lok Sabha constituency: Perambalur
- Nearest Airport: Tiruchirapalli international Airport
- Nearest Railway Station: Srirangam, Ariyalur

Padalur is a village in Alathur Taluk, Perambalur District, Tamil Nadu State. Padalur is a main town in Alathur talku and is located 2 km from Taluk office and 16.9 km from the District headquarters Perambalur . It is 284 km from State Capital Chennai.

Nearest city is Tiruchirappalli (35 km) and nearby towns are Perambalur (18 km) and Srirangam (32 km) Padalur has divided into Padalur West and Padalur East administratively. Tiruvalkurichi is a village that is part of padalur East. Padalur serves as a connecting point for many surrounding villages. It is transforming from a small village to a town with numerous growth opportunities.

== Schools in Padalur ==
- Government Model Higher Secondary School
- Government Adidravidar High School
- ST.Francis matriculations higher secondary school
- Sri Ambaals matriculation school
- Annai Higher Secondary school

== Industries and industrial park ==
Padalur is considered a thriving region with business and industrial development opportunities in the district of perambalur, A modern dairy to process one lakh liters of milk will soon come up at Padalur in the district. The National Dairy Development Board (NDDB) has called for tenders for the project. The NDDB has called for tenders for the project at a cost of Rs. 38 crore on 4 December and they will be opened on 29 December. Once the tenders are finalized, civil works will start and installation of machinery will follow. NDDB will install the machinery. This new dairy unit will be set up in padalur east.

The new textile park proposed to be established in Perambalur district is expected to come up in Padalur village instead of Eraiyur village.

The Padalur village panchayat has already identified a 110-acre site for the project. The panchayat adopted a resolution to hand over the land for the project.

== Colleges around Padalaur ==
- m.a.m college of engineering, Siruganur
- Angalamman College of Engineering, Siruganur
- Trichy engineering college, Konalai
- Thanthai Hans Rover college of engineering, Perambalur
- Dhanalakshmi Srinivasan Medical college, Siruvachur
- sarathas women's college, Siruvachur
