= Ranjankudi Fort =

- Part of Tamil Nadu
- Perambalur District, Tamil Nadu, India
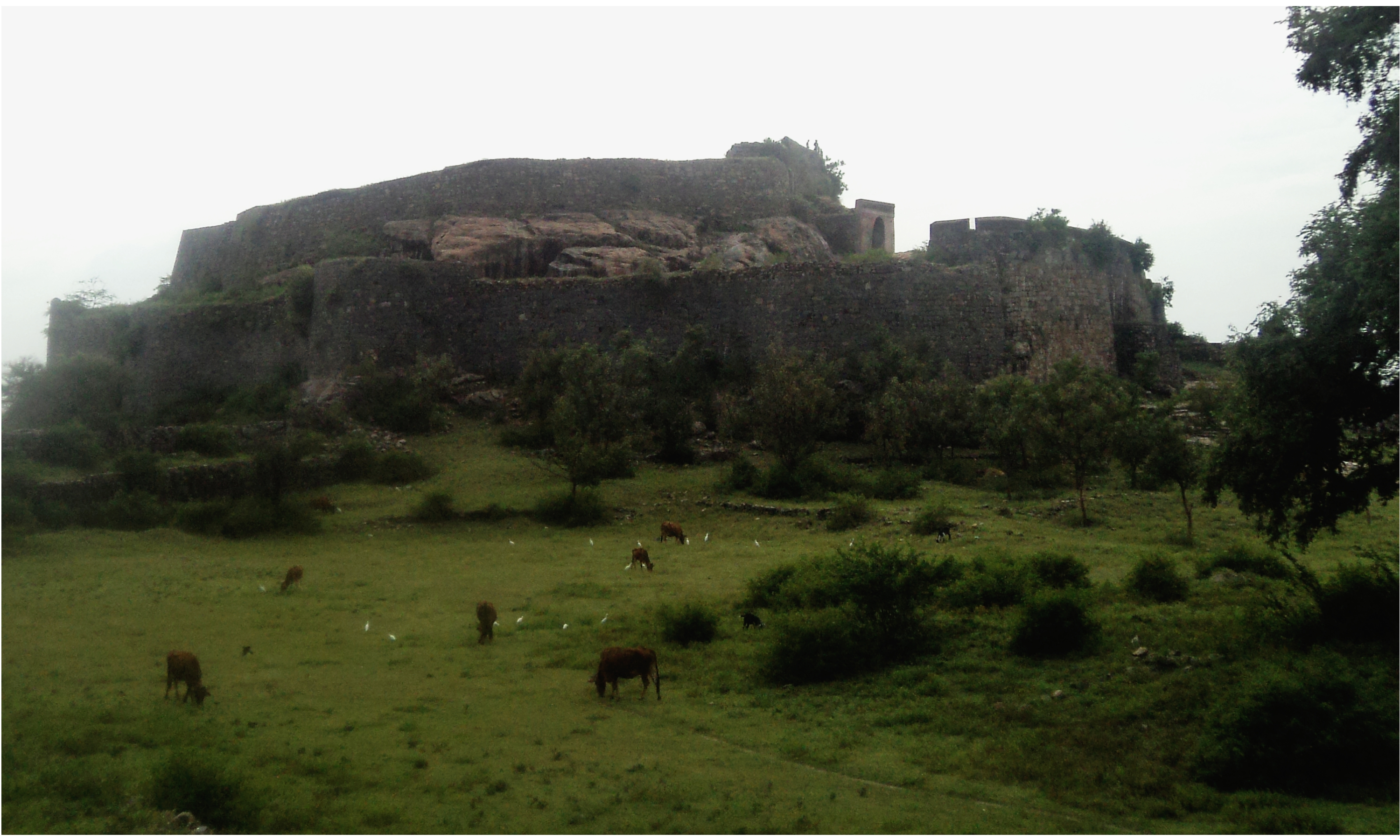
- Image of the fort

Site information
- Type: Forts
- Controlled by: Government of Tamil Nadu
- Condition: Ruins

Location
- Location within Tamil Nadu
- Coordinates: 11.346°N 78.939°E

Ranjankudi Fort is a 15th-century fortress located about 16 km (9.9 mi) north of the town of Perambalur in Tamil Nadu, India. The fort is located 16 km (9.9 mi) north of Perambalur in NH 45 in the South Indian state of Tamil Nadu. It is located 253 km (157 mi) away from the state capital Chennai and 70 km (43 mi) from Trichy.The fort was constructed by Vijayanagar Nayaka Kings. Then occupied by Nawab of the Carnatic.

Ranjakudi fort was the focus point during the Battle of Valikondah during 1751, when the British troops supported by Mohammed Ali won over the French supported by Chanda Sahib. The fort is oblong in shape with semicircular bastions, a moat encircling it and three fortifications at different levels, built with cut stone blocks. The fort has a palace, residence buildings, underground chamber and an underground passage that links Pettai (the top level) with Kottai Medu (lower level). The fort, in modern times, is maintained and administered by the Archaeological Survey of India. The fort is one of the prominent tourist destinations in Perambalur.

== History ==
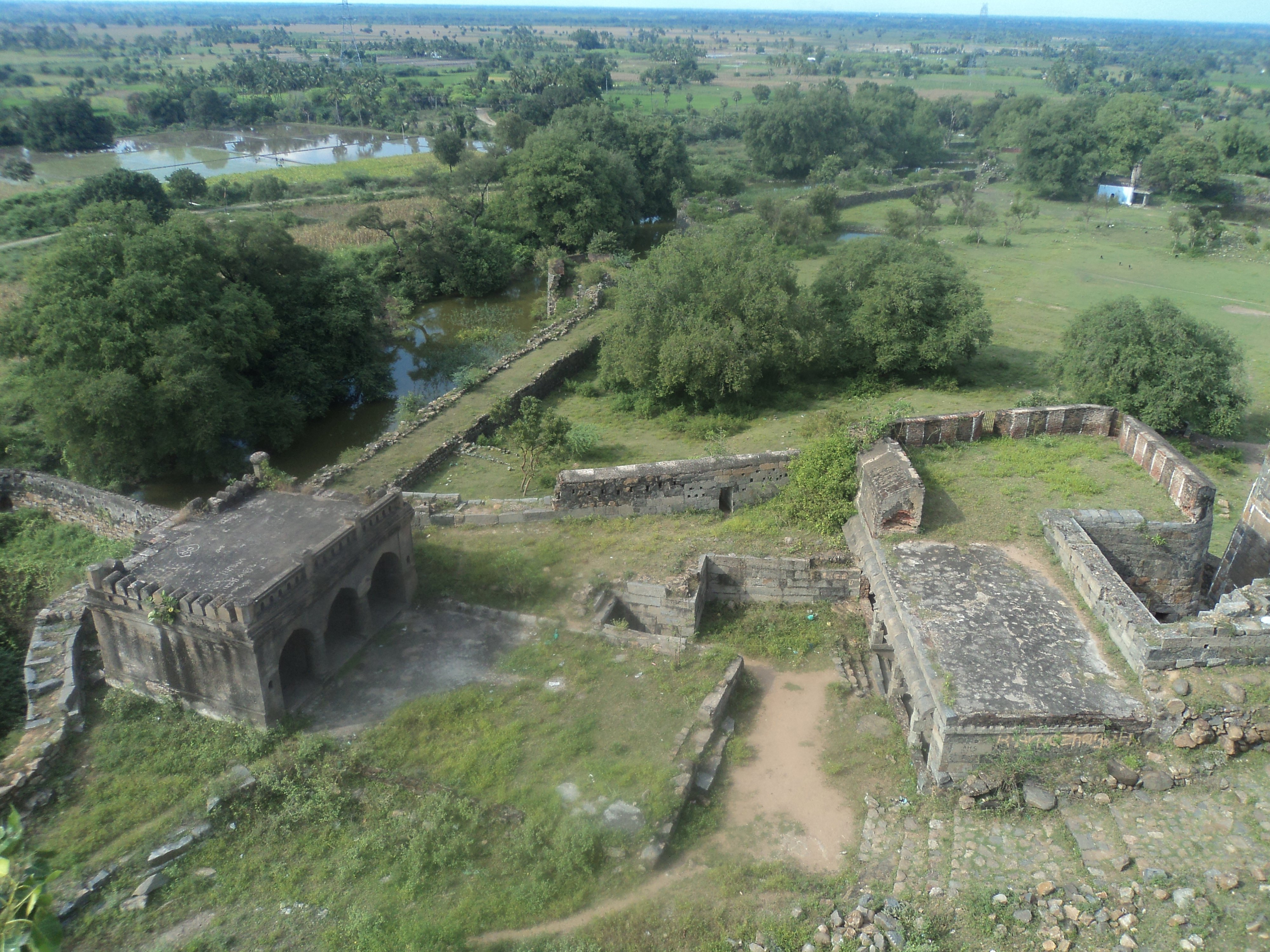
A view of the fort from the top

The fort is called Ranjankudikottai and also referred as Nanjankudikottai. The fort is believed to have been constructed by Vijayanagar Nayaka Kings. Then it was occupied by the Nawab of Carnatic during the 17th century. The fort was the scene of the Battle of Valikondah during 1751. The British troops were supported by Mohammed Ali while the French were supported by Chanda Sahib. Though the battle is called by the nearby village Valikondah, it was fought in the fort. While the French won the initial battle, the British ended up winning the final battle with the help of local Muslims.

In May 1752, the fort was also the scene of surrender of French troops under D'Auteuil, which were sent to relieve the garrison at Srirangam. D'Auteuil was posted in Uttatur and was fended off by the British troops led by Dalton on 9 May. He retreated to Ranjankudi, where the Jagirthar took the side of the British and denied entry to the French troops to the upper level of the fort. D'Auteuil surrendered in the fort.

The fort was located in a strategic position during the colonial times, away from the Tiruchirappalli Rockfort. The fort, in modern times, is maintained and administered by the Archaeological Survey of India.

== Architecture ==
The fort is located 16 km (9.9 mi) north of Perambalur in NH 45 in the South Indian state of Tamil Nadu. It is located 253 km (157 mi) away from the state capital Chennai and 70 km (43 mi) from Trichy. The fort is oblong in shape with semicircular bastions and a moat encircling it. There are three fortifications at different levels, built by Vijaya nagar Nayak kings with cut stone blocks. The lower bastion is the main rampart surrounded by mud wall. The open ground known as Pettai is approached through a flight of steps, which was once a battlefield. The top-tier is called Kottai Medu, used as guarding towers by soldiers and housing cannons. The small water body in the fort is believed to have been used by the Nawab as swimming pool. The fort has a palace, residence buildings, underground chamber and an underground passage that links Pettai with Kottai Medu. The pit in the centre of the fort was used as a prison for male prisoners, while female prisoners were jailed in small blocks inside the fort. As per J. Raja Mohamed, an epigraphist and former curator of Government Museum, the fort culminated Mughal Architecture in the region. It is also believed that he introduced cotton cultivation in the region, which is continued in modern times. The fort is one of the prominent tourist destinations in Perambalur.
