= Alathur taluk, Perambalur =

Taluk in Perambalur, Tamil Nadu, India

Alathur taluk
- Taluk
- Interactive map of Alathur taluk
- Coordinates: 11.1282°N 78.8391°E
- Country: India
- State: Tamil Nadu
- District: Perambalur

Languages
  - Official: Tamil, English
  - Speech: Tamil, English
- Time zone: UTC+5:30 (IST)
- PIN: 621109
- Vehicle registration: TN - 39 ** XXXX
- Neighbourhoods: Padalur, Irur, Nattaramangalam, Pudhukkurichi
- LS: Cuddalore
- VS: Tittakudi

Alathur taluk is a taluk in Perambalur district in the Indian state of Tamil Nadu. It was created by former chief minister J.Jayalalithaa for issues of population increase. Kunnam taluk was bifurcated to form this new taluk.

== Villages ==
There are 39 villages in Alathur taluk excluding the headquarters Alathur.
