= Sillakkudi railway station =

Railway station in Tamil Nadu, India

Sillakkudi

General information
- Location: Tiruchchirappalli Railway Division; India
- Coordinates: 11°05′50.0″N 79°02′15.0″E
- Elevation: 69 metres (226 ft)
- System: Indian Railways station
- Owner: Indian Railways
- Operator: Southern Railway
- Line: Viluppuram–Trichy Chord Line
- Platforms: 2
- Tracks: 5

Other information
- Status: Functioning
- Station code: SLTH
- Zone(s): Southern Railway zone
- Division(s): Tiruchirappalli
- Fare zone: Southern Railway Zone
Route map
Location

Sillakkudi railway station (station code:SLTH) is an NSG–6 category Indian railway station in Tiruchirappalli railway division of Southern Railway zone. It serves Sillakkudi, located in Perambalur district of the Indian state of Tamil Nadu. As of now it is the only railway station serving the entire Perambalur district. It is located between Ariyalur and Kallagam. There is an industrial spur line going towards Chettinad Cement Factory from this railway station which creates a considerable revenue for Southern ys
