= Ekambareswarar Temple, Chettikulam =

Shiva temple in Perambalur district, Tamil Nadu, India

Coordinates: 11.1348572°N 78.7718194°E

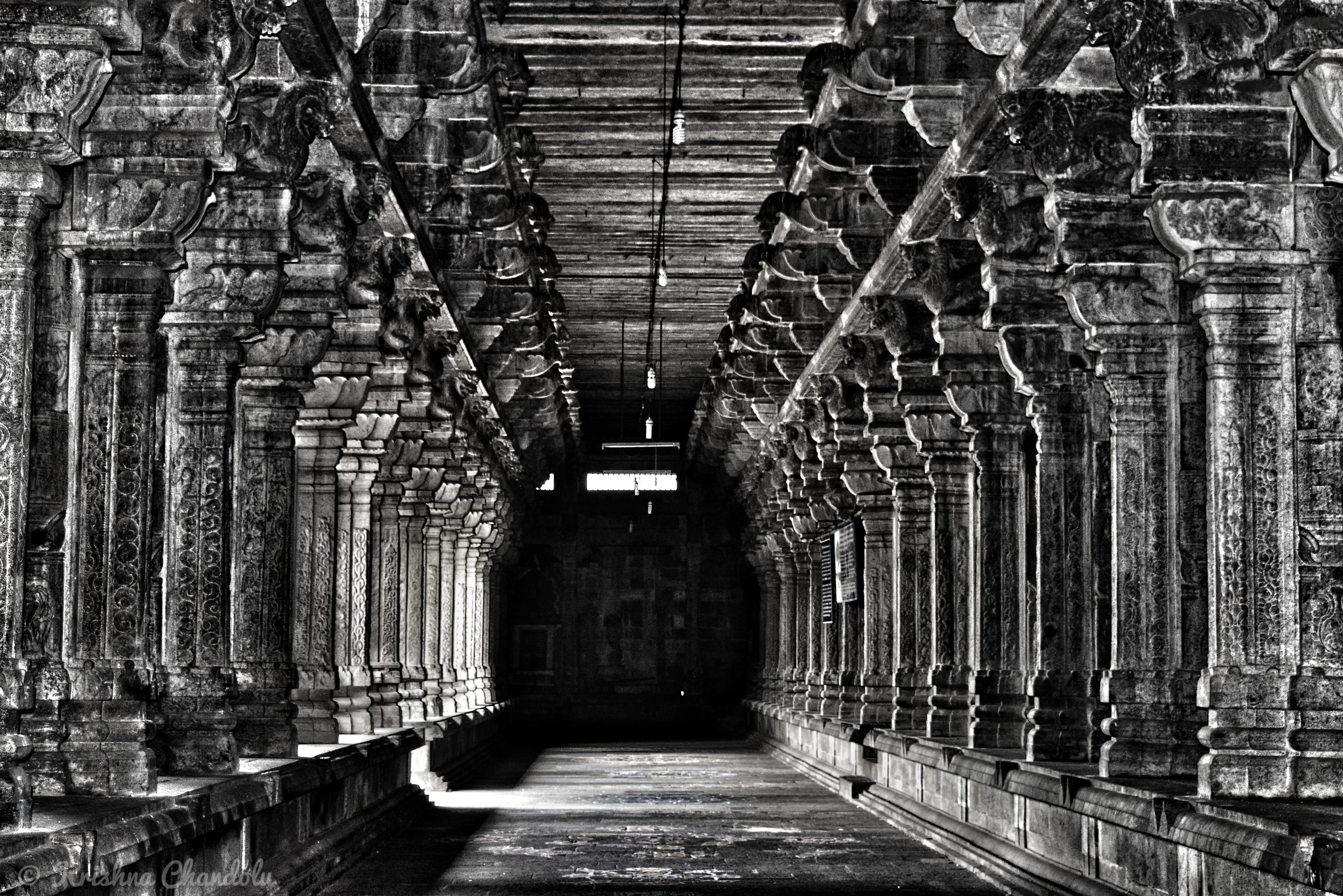
Thousand Pillar Hall in Ekambareswarar Temple

The Ekambareswarar Temple is a Hindu temple in the village of Chettikulam in Perambalur District, Tamil Nadu, in southern India. The temple is dedicated to the Hindu god Shiva. The Thai Poosam festival celebrated in January is an important event for Hindus.

== Temple history and design ==
This is an ancient temple built by Parantaka Chola who reigned from c. 907 to c. 955.

=== Founding ===
In earlier days, the place was a forest of Kadamba trees. In legend, a trader on his way had to stay here at a night. About midnight, he saw a fire ball splitting light, in the midst of which was a Shivalinga being worshipped by Devas and Rishis. The trader informed the Chola king of what he saw. The Chola king rushed to the spot, along with Kulasekhara Pandiyan, who was his guest then. They saw an old man walking there with a red sugarcane as his walking stick. He showed the king the place where the Shivalinga was hiding and disappeared in the form of a fire ball. When they looked in an easterly direction where the old man disappeared, they saw Lord Dhandayuthapani on a hill. In ecstasy, the kings built a temple for Lord Ekambareswara and a temple for Lord Dhandayuthapani, according to the history of the place.

=== Design ===
The temple is famous for its Kubera sculpture showing the Lord of Wealth on His Fish vehicle, installed in 12 places in the temple to represent the 12 signs of the zodiac. When viewed from an elevated position, it is said that the idols combined together looks like the OHM letter shape. According to Vedic scholars from Tiruvannamalai, no temple in India has such Kubera installations. People come to the temple to worship Kubera for wealth.

There are 10 pillars in the inner corridor (prakara) of the temple producing 10 different musical sounds if tapped with a dry sandal stick. There is a Vinayaka shrine in the west hall of the western corridor. Lord Vinayaka is adored as Varaguna Ganapathi. Lord Varaguna Ganapathi graces in the inner corridor with the five headed Nāga (snake). Lord Muruga graces with His consorts Valli and Deivanai holding His Vel in a Vel shaped frame. The shrine of Mother Kamakshi is on the northern side-Kubera corner. There is also a sculptural marvel in the temple on the western Dwarapalaka pillar carved with such rare skill, having a sculpture of one head showing both a bull and elephant when looked at from different angles.

The main tower, Rajagopuram, is 100 feet tall visible up to a distance of 10 kilometers. The rays of Sun fall on Lord Ekambareswara on 19, 20 and 21 of Panguni month (March-April).

=== Kuberar temple ===
The Kuberar temple is inside the compound of Ekambareswarar temple and was built in 2012 by Mr M. Ramasamy, Additional Inspector General of Registration (Retd) who was born in Chettikulam, and his wife Shakunthala Ramasamy. Lord Kubera is the leader of Yatchars who are here to help mankind and procure wealth. Kubera is very much devoted to Shiva. Kubera's wife's name is Chitrakala. Father -Viswara and mother Swathi. Kubera is assisted by sanganidhi and padmanidhi to offer wealth to mankind. The Kubera has control over nine Nidhis. Lord Balaji borrowed money from Kubera for his marriage as a loan. Kubera performed severe penances invoking the blessings of Shiva. Shiva gave darshan to Kubera with his wife Parvathi.

Shiva rewarded Kubera by the following: 1.One of the guards of eight dishas guarding northern disha 2. The lord of wealth and material 3.King of Alagapuri 4.Friendship of Shiva

And hence doing pooja to Kubera will enrich one's life. The most auspicious period to worship Kubera is on Thursdays between 15 October and 15 November each year. Chettikulam Kubera is sitting with his wife Chitrakala on fish and also with nine Nidhis to bless devotees.

== Festivals ==
The ten-day Thaipoosam and Brahmmotsavam in January-February is the longest and important festival of the temple with special pujas and the presiding deity coming in car procession. On the 9th day, Panchamurthis and Mother Kamakshi come in procession in two separate Rathas in the streets of Chettikulam. Aadipooram in July-August, Vinayaka Chaturthi in August-September, Navarathri in September-October, Surasamharam and Deepavali in October-November, Tirukarthikai in November-December, Margazhi festival and Tirvadhirai in December-January, Sivarathri in February-March and Chitra Poornima in April-May are other festivals celebrated in the temple. Monthly Pradosham days, 13th day either from New Moon or Full Moon day, Pongal falling mostly on 14 January, Tamil and English New Year days are other festive days of special pujas to Lord and Mother drawing huge crowd.

== Prayers and thanksgiving ==
A huge number of devotees pray to Kubera, the Lord of Wealth seeking prosperity, besides seeking fruitful marriage talks and child boon. The temple is highly revered as an abode of solution for various problems faced by devotees in matters of health, litigations, recovery of lost things, trade etc.

Devotees perform special abishek (thanksgiving) to Lord and Mother with milk, curd, lime fruit juice, sandal, oil, green coconut offering vastras and they also undertake some kind of fasting. Some do charities. The nivedhana offered to Lord and Mother is distributed to the devotees.
