= Poolambadi =

- Town
- Location in Tamil Nadu, India Poolambadi (India)
- Coordinates: 11°24′37″N 78°41′41″E
- Country: India
- State: Tamil Nadu
- District: Perambalur

Government
  - Type: Town Panchayat

Population (2001)
  - Total: 10,081

Languages
  - Official: Tamil
- Time zone: UTC+5:30 (IST)
- Postal code: 621110
- Vehicle registration: TN46

Poolambadi is a panchayat town in Perambalur district in the Indian state of Tamil Nadu. Located 1,921 kilometres (1,194 mi) from New Delhi, the Indian capital.

== Demographics ==
As of 2001 India census, Poolambadi had a population of 10,027. Males constitute 50% of the population and females 50%. Poolambadi has an average literacy rate of 60%, higher than the national average of 59.5%: male literacy is 70%, and female literacy is 50%. In Poolambadi, 10% of the population is under 6 years of age.

== Agriculture ==
Poolambadi is famous for its fertile agricultural fields. The various crops cultivated are paddy rice, corn, sugarcane, tapioca, sunflower and timber. This village was once famous for sandalwood trees in the district. The people who came from Kongu region were changed the style of agriculture, and their contribution is unavoidable in poolambadi's development.
