= Tamilization =

Tamilization is the cultural expansion of the Tamil people native to the southern part of India and the northern and eastern part of Sri Lanka.

The Tamils traditional homeland according to Sangam period sources covered the modern states Tamil Nadu, Kerala, Puducherry, Lakshadweep and southern parts of Karnataka and Andhra Pradesh, although ancient Tamil settlement were also found in Sri Lanka (Sri Lankan Tamils) and Maldives (Giravarus). However, between the 2nd century BC and the 14th century AD, Tamil trader colonies were established in many parts of West Asia, South-East Asia and Egypt apart from the islands of the Indian Ocean.

During British rule, large numbers of Tamils from the Madras Presidency were transported to Malaya, Singapore, Mauritius, Seychelles, South Africa, Central Sri Lanka, Reunion, Trinidad and Tobago, Fiji and Guyana to work as indentured labourers in sugar plantations. There was also a large mercantile class in Burma, Sri Lanka, South-East Asia and the Persian Gulf countries.

== Sri Lanka ==
The first colonies of Tamil-speaking people outside the Indian mainland were founded in Sri Lanka. While there has been evidence of pre-historic Tamil settlements in Sri Lanka, the earliest records of a Tamil presence in the island date from about 185 BC, when the legendary Chola king Ellalan invaded and conquered Sri Lanka. Migration accelerated between the 5th and 14th centuries AD, when the Pallava, Chola and Pandya kings mounted large-scale expeditions to conquer the island. The presence of a large number of Tamil mercenaries in the island by the 11th century CE is indicated by the Velakkara Revolt. The migrations rapidly decreased after the attack of the Pandya kingdom by the Delhi Sultanate's Muslim general Malik Kafur in about 1317, though cultural and commercial contact between the southern Tamil Nadu and northern Sri Lanka continued. The Nayaks of Kandy had matrimonial alliances with the Thanjavur Nayak kingdom. Following the conquest of the Kandy kingdom by the East India Company in 1795, the British ruled the island as a part of Madras Presidency till 1803, when a separate administration was set up. Starting from the middle of the 19th century, the British transported large numbers of Tamils to work as indentured labourers in the hills of central Sri Lanka.

As of 2012, Tamil speakers constituted 25 percent of the total population of Sri Lankan population with large concentrations in the northern, north-eastern and central parts of the island. There has been uninhibited exchange of vocabulary between Tamil and Sinhala. Tamil is one of the official languages of Sri Lanka.

== De-Tamilization ==
De-Tamilization refers to disappearance of Tamil culture and language. By the end of 13th century, the power of Tamil dynasties like Pandyans, Cheras and Cholas slowly declined in Tamilakam. The Tamil language disappeared in western Tamilakam (Kerala), which led to the rise of Malayalam, the people's language.

The state backed De-Tamilization or Sinhalisation of Sri Lanka was a major factor in contributing to the ethnic polarization towards the outbreak of the Sri Lankan civil war.

== See also ==
- List of countries and territories where Tamil is an official language
- Tamil Diaspora
