= Veppanthattai taluk =

Taluk in Perambalur, Tamil Nadu

Veppanthattai is a taluk of Perambalur district of the Indian state of Tamil Nadu. The headquarters of the taluk is the town of Veppanthattai.

== Demographics ==
According to the 2011 census, the taluk of Veppanthattai had a population of 148,700 with 73,598 males and 75,102 females. There were 1020 women for every 1000 men. The taluk had a literacy rate of 65.36. Child population in the age group below 6 was 7,906 Males and 7,266 Females.
