= States of India by Tamil speakers =

This is a list of states and territories of India by number of people for whom Tamil is their mother tongue (first language).

State/territory	1981 census (Note: Excludes Assam where no census was carried out due to separatist insurgency.) (Note: Household population only i.e. excludes people in institutions.)			1991 census (Note: Excludes Jammu and Kashmir where no census was carried out due to separatist insurgency.)			2001 census			2011 census		
State/territory	Tamil pop.	% of state	% of Tamil	Tamil pop.	% of state	% of Tamil	Tamil pop.	% of state	% of Tamil	Tamil pop.	% of state	% of Tamil
Tamil Nadu	41,045,591	85.35%	91.76%	48,434,744	86.71%	91.38%	55,798,916	89.41%	91.78%	63,753,997	88.37%	92.36%
Karnataka	1,385,313	3.76%	3.10%	1,728,361	3.84%	3.26%	1,874,959	3.55%	3.08%	2,110,128	3.45%	3.06%
Puducherry	534,560	89.18%	1.20%	720,473	89.19%	1.36%	861,502	88.42%	1.42%	1,100,976	88.22%	1.59%
Andhra Pradesh	654,463	1.23%	1.46%	753,484	1.13%	1.42%	769,685	1.01%	1.27%	713,848	0.84%	1.03%
Maharashtra	300,348	0.48%	0.67%	427,447	0.54%	0.81%	527,995	0.55%	0.87%	509,887	0.45%	0.74%
Kerala	603,188	2.39%	1.35%	616,010	2.12%	1.16%	596,971	1.87%	0.98%	502,516	1.50%	0.73%
Delhi	54,776	0.89%	0.12%	84,873	0.90%	0.16%	92,426	0.67%	0.15%	82,719	0.49%	0.12%
Andaman & Nicobar	26,485	14.81%	0.06%	53,536	19.07%	0.10%	62,961	17.68%	0.10%	57,830	15.20%	0.08%
Gujarat	21,852	0.06%	0.05%	34,498	0.08%	0.07%	37,092	0.07%	0.06%	40,072	0.07%	0.06%
Madhya Pradesh	32,152	0.06%	0.07%	38,562	0.06%	0.07%	24,848	0.04%	0.04%	20,544	0.03%	0.03%
West Bengal	19,447	0.04%	0.04%	25,797	0.04%	0.05%	20,238	0.03%	0.03%	15,930	0.02%	0.02%
Jammu & Kashmir	866	0.01%	0.00%	n/a	n/a	n/a	9,494	0.09%	0.02%	14,728	0.12%	0.02%
Uttar Pradesh	3,455	0.00%	0.01%	15,569	0.01%	0.03%	13,665	0.01%	0.02%	14,444	0.01%	0.02%
Haryana	4,082	0.03%	0.01%	5,202	0.03%	0.01%	10,207	0.05%	0.02%	12,658	0.05%	0.02%
Punjab	3,280	0.02%	0.01%	6,271	0.03%	0.01%	12,339	0.05%	0.02%	10,389	0.04%	0.02%
Chhattisgarh	-	-	-	-	-	-	13,241	0.06%	0.02%	10,334	0.04%	0.01%
Jharkhand	-	-	-	-	-	-	12,913	0.05%	0.02%	10,061	0.03%	0.01%
Rajasthan	5,117	0.01%	0.01%	12,461	0.03%	0.02%	11,852	0.02%	0.02%	8,939	0.01%	0.01%
Goa	3,884	0.37%	0.01%	6,818	0.58%	0.01%	7,903	0.59%	0.01%	6,947	0.48%	0.01%
Odisha	8,906	0.03%	0.02%	11,502	0.04%	0.02%	8,709	0.02%	0.01%	6,155	0.01%	0.01%
Chandigarh	3,426	0.78%	0.01%	5,318	0.83%	0.01%	5,716	0.63%	0.01%	5,579	0.53%	0.01%
Assam	n/a	n/a	n/a	1,770	0.01%	0.00%	5,672	0.02%	0.01%	5,229	0.02%	0.01%
Uttarakhand	-	-	-	-	-	-	2,215	0.03%	0.00%	2,584	0.03%	0.00%
Manipur	1,832	0.13%	0.00%	2,600	0.14%	0.00%	2,279	0.11%	0.00%	1,657	0.06%	0.00%
Arunachal Pradesh	548	0.09%	0.00%	887	0.10%	0.00%	1,595	0.15%	0.00%	1,246	0.09%	0.00%
Nagaland	258	0.03%	0.00%	1,166	0.10%	0.00%	1,441	0.07%	0.00%	1,127	0.06%	0.00%
Himachal Pradesh	458	0.01%	0.00%	569	0.01%	0.00%	1,066	0.02%	0.00%	1,038	0.02%	0.00%
Bihar	15,351	0.02%	0.03%	16,304	0.02%	0.03%	1,453	0.00%	0.00%	986	0.00%	0.00%
Tripura	131	0.01%	0.00%	423	0.02%	0.00%	1,312	0.04%	0.00%	929	0.03%	0.00%
Meghalaya	290	0.02%	0.00%	642	0.04%	0.00%	834	0.04%	0.00%	913	0.03%	0.00%
Sikkim	133	0.04%	0.00%	169	0.04%	0.00%	484	0.09%	0.00%	762	0.12%	0.00%
Dadra & Nagar Haveli	54	0.05%	0.00%	199	0.14%	0.00%	666	0.30%	0.00%	739	0.22%	0.00%
Lakshadweep	35	0.09%	0.00%	282	0.55%	0.00%	386	0.64%	0.00%	364	0.56%	0.00%
Daman & Diu	-	-	-	100	0.10%	0.00%	348	0.22%	0.00%	320	0.13%	0.00%
Mizoram	108	0.02%	0.00%	331	0.05%	0.00%	431	0.05%	0.00%	306	0.03%	0.00%
India	44,730,389	6.76%	100.00%	53,006,368	6.32%	100.00%	60,793,814	5.91%	100.00%	69,026,881	5.70%	100.00%

== See also ==
- List of countries and territories where Tamil is an official language
- Tamil population by nation
- Tamil population by cities
