= Tamil population by cities =

List of Tamil population per city

This is a list of Tamil population per city (excluding Tamil Nadu & Pondicherry).Some cities in Sri Lanka also includes Sri Lankan Moors population because most of them have Tamil as their mother tongue.In Singapore the number also includes ethnic Tamils who don't speak Tamil at home

City	Country	Numbers	Percent	Year	Notes	Refs
Mysore	India	137,452	4.58%	2011 census		
Ballari	India	8,309	1.74%	2011 census		
Tirupati	India	10,041	3.40%	2011 census		
Bangalore	India	2,379,697	16.34%	2011 census		
Thiruvananthapuram	India	38,813	1.18%	2011 census		
Hyderabad	India	74,910	1.1%	2011 census		
Anuradhapura	Sri Lanka	4,720	9.33%	2012 census		
Kandy	Sri Lanka	38,086	24.01%	2012 census		
Kolonnawa	Sri Lanka	19,881	30.64%	2012 census		
Negombo	Sri Lanka	32,860	23.19%	2012 census		
Sri Jayawardenepura Kotte	Sri Lanka	13,511	12.57%	2012 census		
Moratuwa	Sri Lanka	7,260	4.1%	2012 census		
Dehiwala-Mount Lavinia	Sri Lanka	49,839	27.24%	2012 census		
Durban	South Africa	378,000	11.3%			
London	United Kingdom	200,000	2.35%			
Toronto	Canada	200,000	7.52%			
Singapore	Singapore	198,449	4.91%	2020 census	(Note: Resident Indian Tamil population. Another source puts the Tamil population in Singapore at 200,000.)	
Colombo	Sri Lanka	457,820	60.8%	2012 census	(Note: Sri Lankan Tamil, Indian Tamil and Sri Lankan Moorsonly. Excludes other ethnic groups whose mother tongue is Tamil.) (Note: Tamil population in Colombo and Thimbirigasyaya DS Divisions which together make up the Colombo municipality.)	
Penang	Malaysia	166,000	10.0%			
Kuala Lumpur	Malaysia	142,300	10.3%			
Paris	France	100,000	1.00%			
Jaffna	Sri Lanka	80,743	98.43%	2004 census	(Note: Sri Lankan Tamil and Indian Tamil only. Excludes Sri Lankan Moors and other ethnic groups whose mother tongue is Tamil.)	
Batticaloa	Sri Lanka	516,144	98.30%	2012 census	(Note: Tamil population in Manmunai North DS Division which is commensurate with Batticaloa municipality.)	
Ipoh	Malaysia	73,220	11.3%			
Medan	Indonesia	40,000	1.67%			
Vavuniya	Sri Lanka	35,605	93.45%	2012 census	(Note: Tamil population in urban council area.)	
Mannar	Sri Lanka	21,597	88.45%	2012 census		
Thaton	Myanmar	15,000	12%			
Montreal	Canada	10,000	0.82%			
Sungai Siput	Malaysia	9,500	20.1%			
Kuala Selangor	Malaysia	8,500	20.3%			
Oslo	Norway	7,200	1.29%			
Bagan Datoh	Malaysia	6,950	20.2%			
Palermo	Italy	4,500	0.60%			

== See also ==
- List of countries and territories where Tamil is an official language
- Tamil population by nation
- States of India by Tamil speakers
