= Tamil population by nation =

This is a list of Tamil population per nation.

Country	Tamil Population	Percent	Year	Notes	Refs
India	69,810,141	5.89%	2011 census	(Note: Mother tongue Tamil.)	
Sri Lanka	3,281,987	15.07%	2024 census	(Note: Sri Lankan Tamil and Indian Tamil only. Sri Lankan Moors and other ethnic groups whose mother tongue is Tamil are excluded.)	
Malaysia	2,327,000	6.7%	2020 estimates	(Note: Another source puts the Tamil population in Malaysia at 1,060,000.)	
Myanmar	1,000,000	1.8%	2018 estimates	(Note: The Times of India gives Myanmar's Tamil population as 10 lakh (1,000,000) as of 2018. The Union of Catholic Asian News and La Croix International state that Tamil people comprise about 2 percent of Myanmar's population of 51 million as of 2018. This is contradicted by other sources. Sivasupramaniam states that Burma had a Tamil population of 200,000 once but this had reduced after the end of World War II. Tamil Nation states that Burma had a Tamil population of 200,000 as of 1966. Tamil Catholics are estimated to number about 50,000.)	
United States	341,396	0.1%	2021 estimates	(Note: The U.S. census data considers only the population age 5 and older.)	
South Africa	250,000	0.4%	2018 estimates		
Canada	237,890	0.7%	2021 census		
Singapore	198,449	4.9%	2020 census	(Note: Resident Indian Tamil population. Another source puts the Tamil population in Singapore at 200,000. Note: The Singapore Tamil population data provided by the Singapore government excludes Tamils who were unable to speak, and those in one-person households and households comprising only unrelated persons. The figure for the 'percentage of Tamils' is based on the number of ethnic Tamils among the resident population of Singapore, ignoring the foreign workers.)	
France	125,000	0.18%	2008 estimates		
England	123,203	0.2%	2021 census		
Réunion	120,000	14.5%	2017 estimates		
Australia	95,411	0.38%	2021 Census		
Fiji	80,000	9.5%	2017 estimates		
Mauritius	72,089	5.83%	2011 census	(Note: Tamil, Tamil Hindu, and Christian Tamil. Another source puts the Tamil population in Mauritius at 115,000.)	
Germany	60,000	0.07%	2008 estimates		
Switzerland	40,000	0.46%			
Indonesia	40,000	0.01%			
Guadeloupe	36,000	9%	2020 estimates		
Italy	25,000	0.04%			
Netherlands	20,000	0.12%			
Norway	13,000	0.24%			
New Zealand	10,107	0.21%	2018 Census		
United Arab Emirates	10,000	0.1%	2020 estimates		
Austria	10,000	0.11%	2016 estimates		
Scotland	7,398	0.1%	2011 census		
Denmark	7,000	0.12%	2020 estimates		
Belgium	7,000	0.06%	2016 estimates		
Bahrain	7,000	0.2%	2020 estimates		
China	5,000	0.0003%	2020 estimates		
Qatar	4,000	0.2%	2020 estimates		
Seychelles	4,000	4.2%	2020 estimates		
Wales	4,296	0.1%	2011 census		
Ireland	1,800	0.04%	2016 census		
Spain	1,500	0.003%	2020 estimates		
Finland	1,000	0.02%	2019 estimates		
Portugal	1,000	0.01%	2020 estimates		
Cambodia	1,000	0.006%	2020 estimates		
Malta	1,000	0.2%	2020 estimates		
Maldives	500	0.1%	2020 estimates		
Greece	500	0.005%	2020 estimates		
Poland	500	0.001%	2020 estimates		
Czech Republic	300	0.003%	2020 estimates		
Hungary	200	0.002%	2016 estimates		
Nauru	200	2%	2020 estimates		
Luxembourg	50	0.008%	2018 estimates		
Romania	50	0.00025%	2020 estimates		
Bulgaria	50	0.0007%	2020 estimates		
Slovakia	50	0.0009%	2020 estimates		
Pakistan	At least 200	0.0%	2018 estimates	(Note: The Hindu mentions Pakistan's Tamil population as 100 families.)	
Guyana	At least 1	0.0%	2018 data		
Papua New Guinea	At least 1	0.0%	2018 data		

== See also ==
- List of countries and territories where Tamil is an official language
- Tamil population by cities
- States of India by Tamil speakers
