= List of countries and territories where Tamil is an official language =

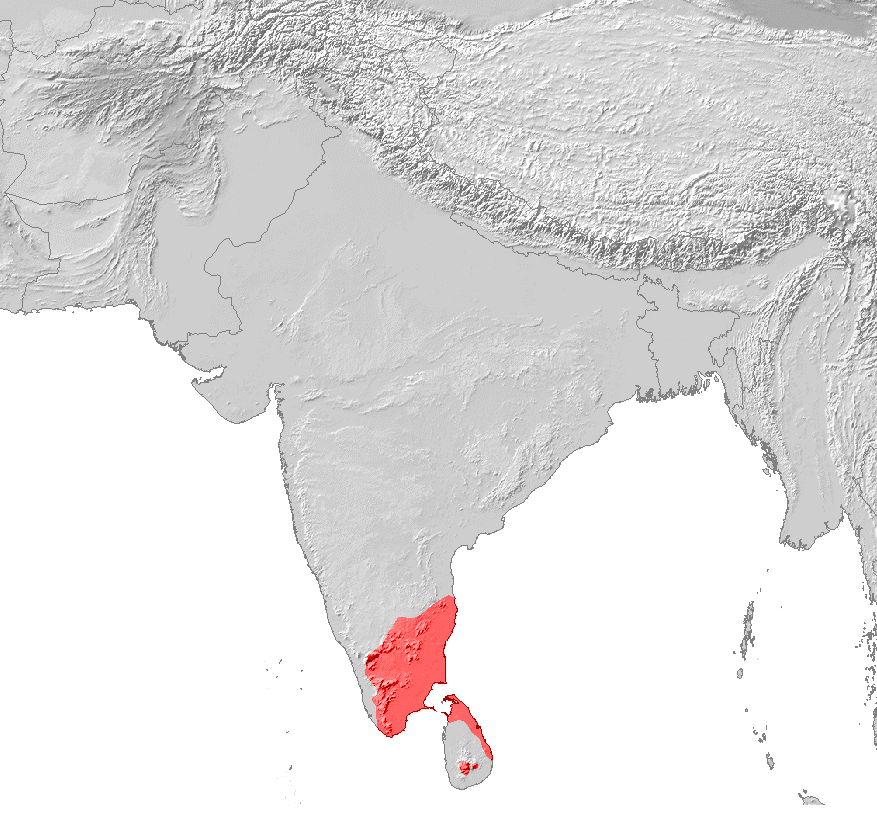
Distribution of Tamil speakers in the Indian subcontinent.

Historical map of the Chola Empire, where Tamil was the language of administration.

The following is a list of sovereign states and territories where Tamil is an official language or language of government.

Tamil is the 17th most spoken language in the world. Tamil language speakers make up approximately 1.06% of the world population. The Tamil language is native to Tamil Nadu (India), Puducherry (India) and Sri Lanka, where most of the native Tamil speaking population is highly concentrated. Tamil is also recognized as a classical language by the Government of India in 2004 and was the first language to achieve such status. Tamil is one of the 22 official languages of India.

Tamil was one of the prominent languages of trade in the region during the pre-colonial era. Tamil mercantile guilds like Ainnurruvar were active in Southeast Asia, and several Tamil inscriptions and coins can be found in parts of Asia and Africa such as in China, Cambodia, Egypt and Indonesia. During the 18th century, British and French colonial rulers relocated several Tamil citizens to their other colonial possessions in Asia and Africa, which today contain sizeable Tamil-speaking communities as a result.

== Sovereign states ==
Sovereign state	Tamil-speaking population^{1}	Notes
Singapore	688,591	Co-official language, along with English, Malay, and Mandarin
Sri Lanka	4,200,000	Co-official and national language, along with Sinhala

== Dependent entities ==
Entity	Tamil-speaking population	Notes
(India) Puducherry^{a}	1,244,464	Co-official language, along with Malayalam and Telugu
(India) Tamil Nadu^{b}	72,138,958	Official language, whereas English may be used as an associate language for official purposes.
a. Union territory of India. b. State of India.

== International institutions ==
Institution	Languages
Association of Southeast Asian Nations (ASEAN)	English (working language), Burmese, Filipino, Indonesian, Khmer, Lao, Malay, Mandarin, Tamil, Thai and Vietnamese.

== Recognised as a minority language ==
Country	Tamil-speaking population	Notes
Malaysia	1,800,000	The Malaysian government recognizes Tamil as a minority language along with Chinese. The "national-type" school's medium of instruction is either in Tamil or Chinese.
Mauritius	72,089	Tamils were the first immigrants to be brought to Mauritius by the French. Later, the British would also bring Tamils to fight against the French. In recognition of their impact on the country's history, Tamil is one of the languages featured on the currency of Mauritius.
South Africa	600,000	The Constitution of the Republic of South Africa, 1996 - Chapter 1: Founding Provisions states that "A Pan South African Language Board established by national legislation must promote and ensure respect for all languages commonly used by communities in South Africa, including... Tamil" along with several other minority languages.

== Dependent entities and territories where Tamil was formerly an official language ==
Entity	Population	Time period	Notes
(India) Haryana^{a}	10,572	1969–2010	Tamil was once given nominal official status in Haryana as a rebuff against Punjabi. Although, it never served any practical purpose. However, it was later replaced with Punjabi in 2010.
a. State of India. b. Former unrecognized quasi-state in northeastern Sri Lanka.

== See also ==
- Tamil population per nation
- Tamil population by cities
- States of India by Tamil speakers
- Tamil loanwords in other languages
- Tamil language
- Tamil people
- List of languages by first written accounts
- Tamil keyboard

By ISO 639-3 code
Enter an ISO code to find the corresponding language article.
