= Perambalur district =

- District of Tamil Nadu
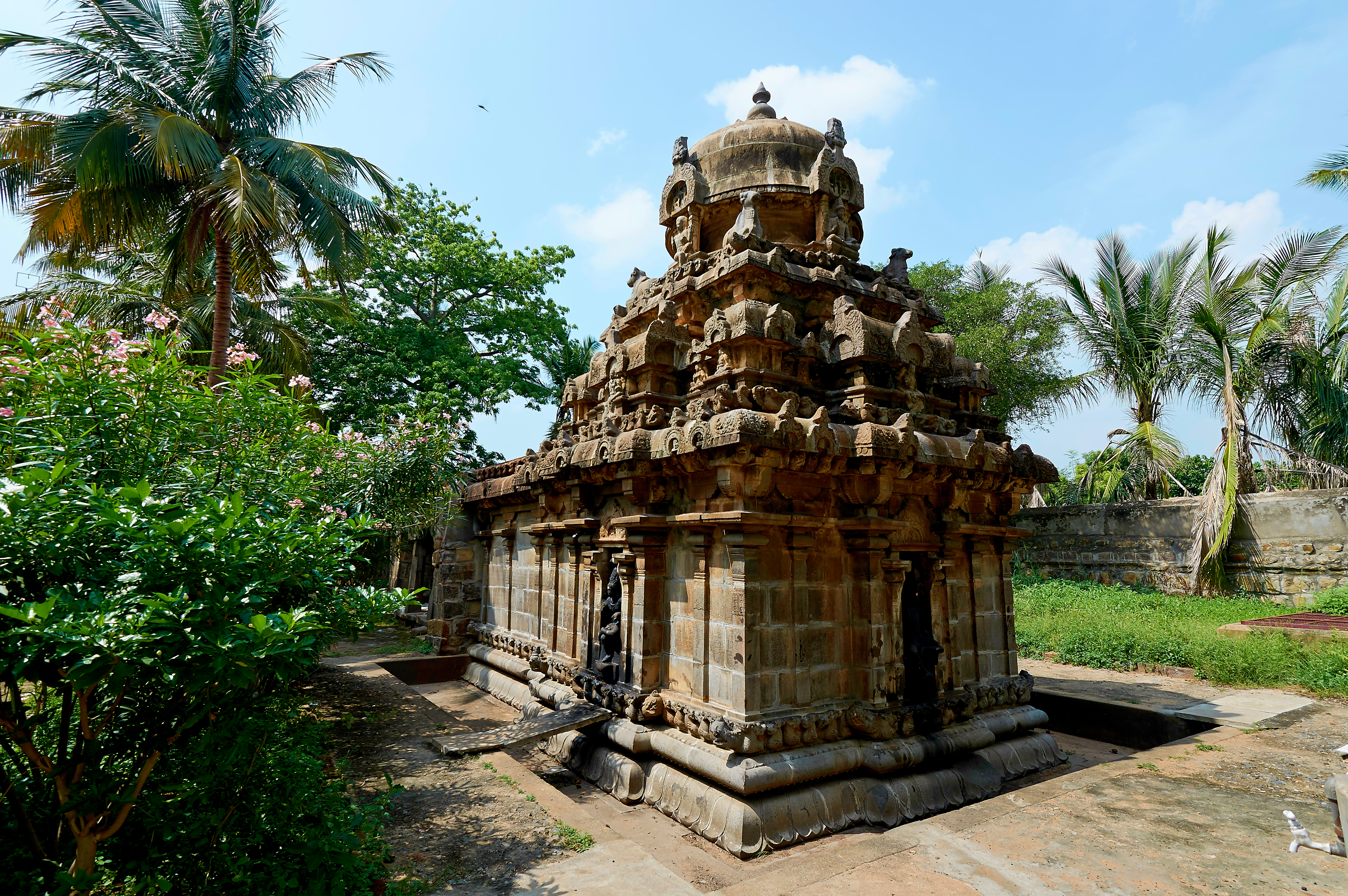
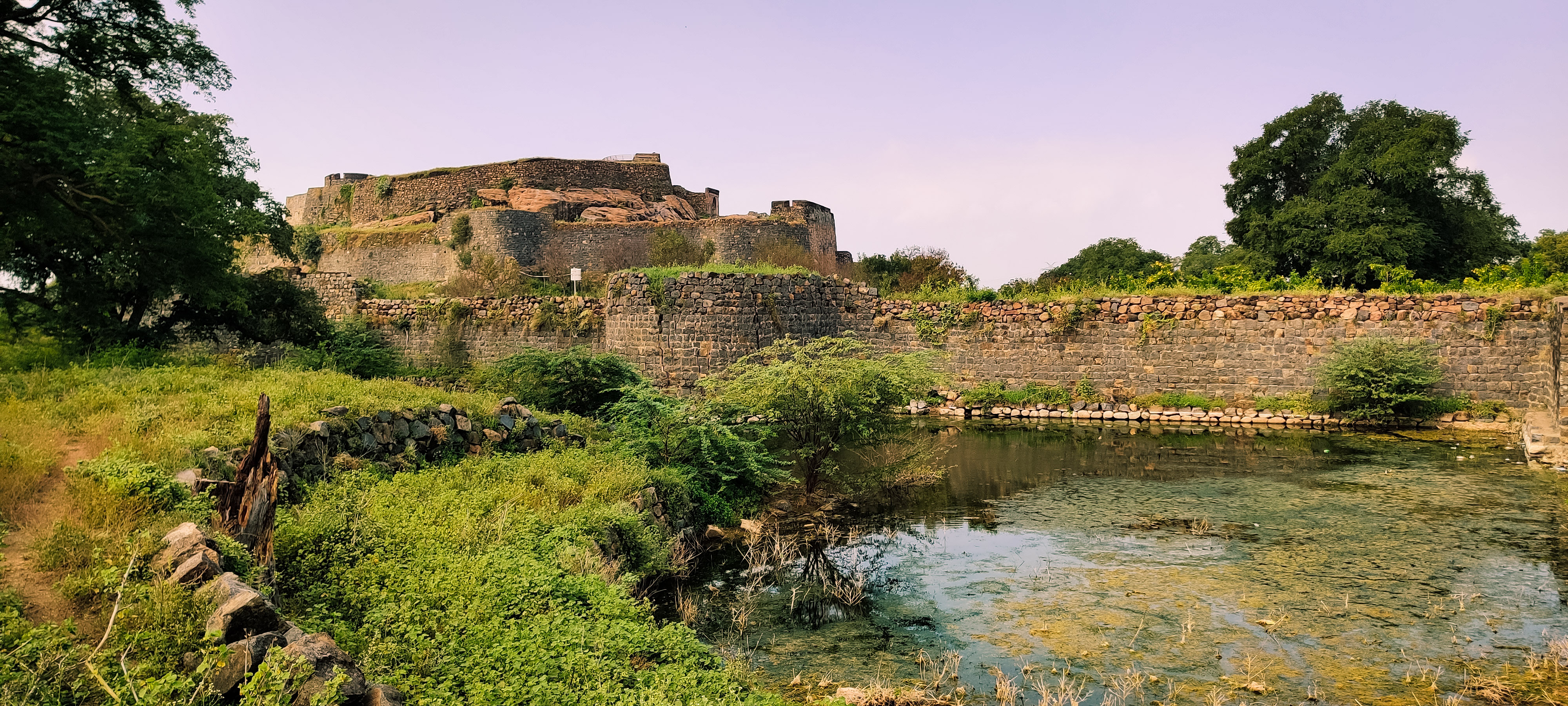
- Top: Vadavaayilsrikoyil at Erattaikoyil; Bottom: Ranjankudi Fort
- Nickname: Perumpuliyur
- Location in Tamil Nadu
- Perambalur district
- Coordinates: 11°14′.6″N 78°52′59.92″E
- Country: India
- State: Tamil Nadu
- Headquarters: Perambalur

Government
  - Collector: K. Karpagam I.A.S
  - Superintendent of Police: S. Mani, IPS

Area
  - Total: 1,752 km^{2} (676 sq mi)

Population (2011)
  - Total: 565,223
  - Density: 322.6/km^{2} (835.6/sq mi)

Languages
  - Official: Tamil
- Time zone: UTC+5:30 (IST)
- PIN: 621212
- Telephone code: 04328
- Vehicle registration: TN-46
- Sex ratio: 0.993 ♂/♀
- Literacy: 74.32%%
- Climate: Semi-arid (Köppen)
- Precipitation: 908 millimetres (35.7 in)
- Website: perambalur.nic.in

Perambalur district is one of the 38 districts (an administrative district) in the state of Tamil Nadu, India. The district headquarters is located at Perambalur. The district occupies an area of 1,752 km^{2} and had a population of 565,223 with a sex-ratio of 1,003 females for every 1,000 males in 2011.

Perambalur district is a centrally located inland district of Tamil Nadu. It was trifurcated from the erstwhile composite Tiruchirappalli district and was formed on 1 January 1995. The district is bounded by the following districts Kallakurichi in the North, Cuddalore in Northeast, Ariyalur in East, Tiruchirappalli in West and South and Salem in Northwest.

== Geography ==
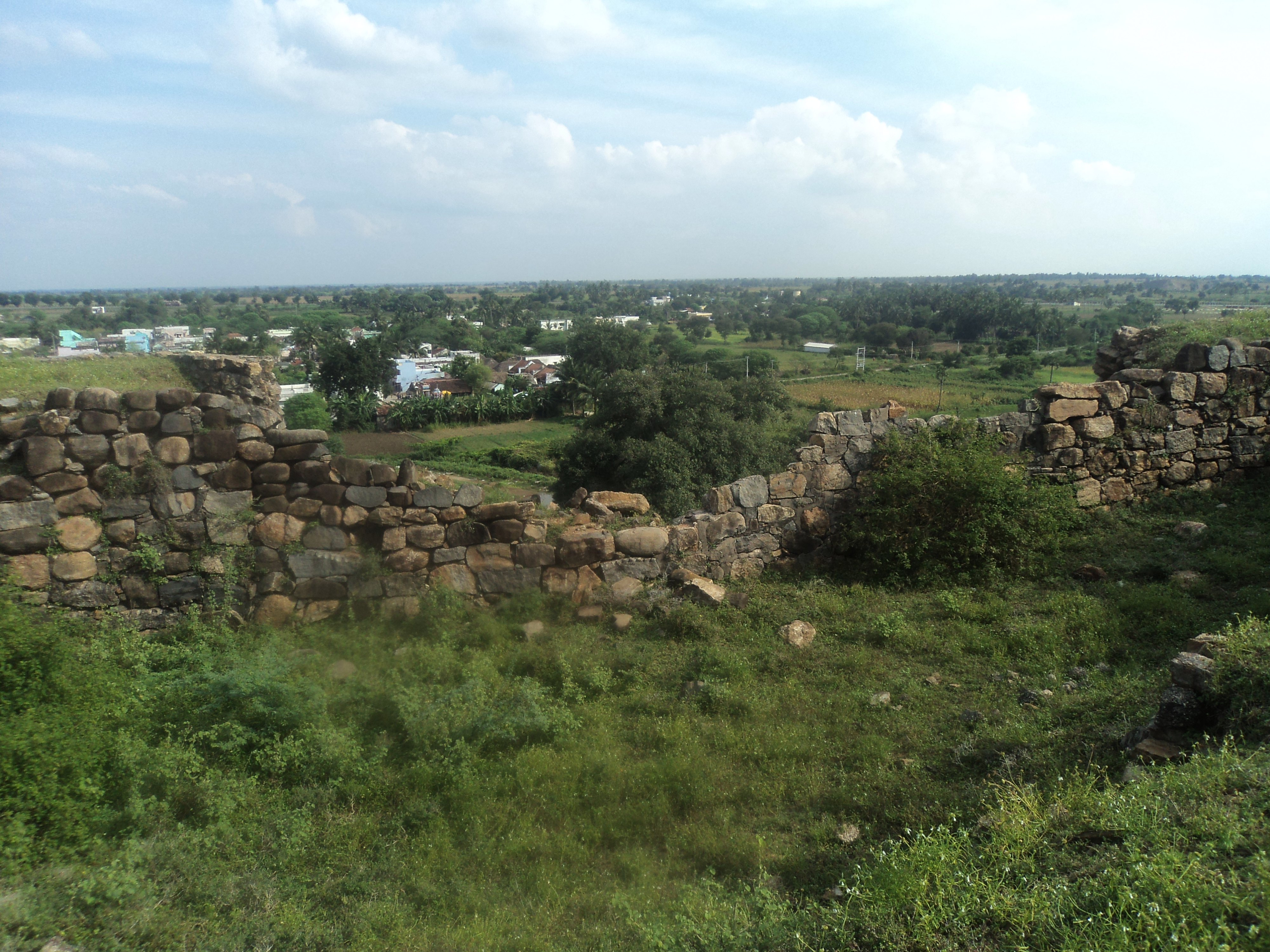
View from Ranjankudi Fort.

The district lies in the southern plateau and hill zone of agro-climate regional planning with characteristics of semi-arid climate and the world class black granite in Pachai Malai hills. The soil is predominantly red loamy and black soil. The normal rainfall of the district is 908 mm which is less than 946.9 mm, the normal rainfall of the State. The precipitation during northeast monsoon, southwest monsoon and remaining winter & hot weather period account for 52%, 34% and 14% of annual rainfall, respectively.

Cauvery is the major river flowing in the region and the composite district has a canal system covering just 47 km stretch and ayacut of 11,610 ha. The ground water resource through tubewells and wells contribute nearly 68% of irrigated area command. The major crops grown in the district are paddy, groundnut, sugarcane and millets. Cashew is the major plantation crop. Now the major cultivation is small Onion, totally 24% in Tamil Nadu i.e. first place in Tamil Nadu. The Onion cultivation villages are Erattai malai sandhu (Keelakkarai), Esanai, Elambalur, Nakkasalem, Ammapalayam, Siruvayalur, Chettikulam, Kalarampatty, Melapuliyur, Navalur, K.Pudur, Arumbavur, Irur, Alathur, Padalur, etc.

== Economy ==
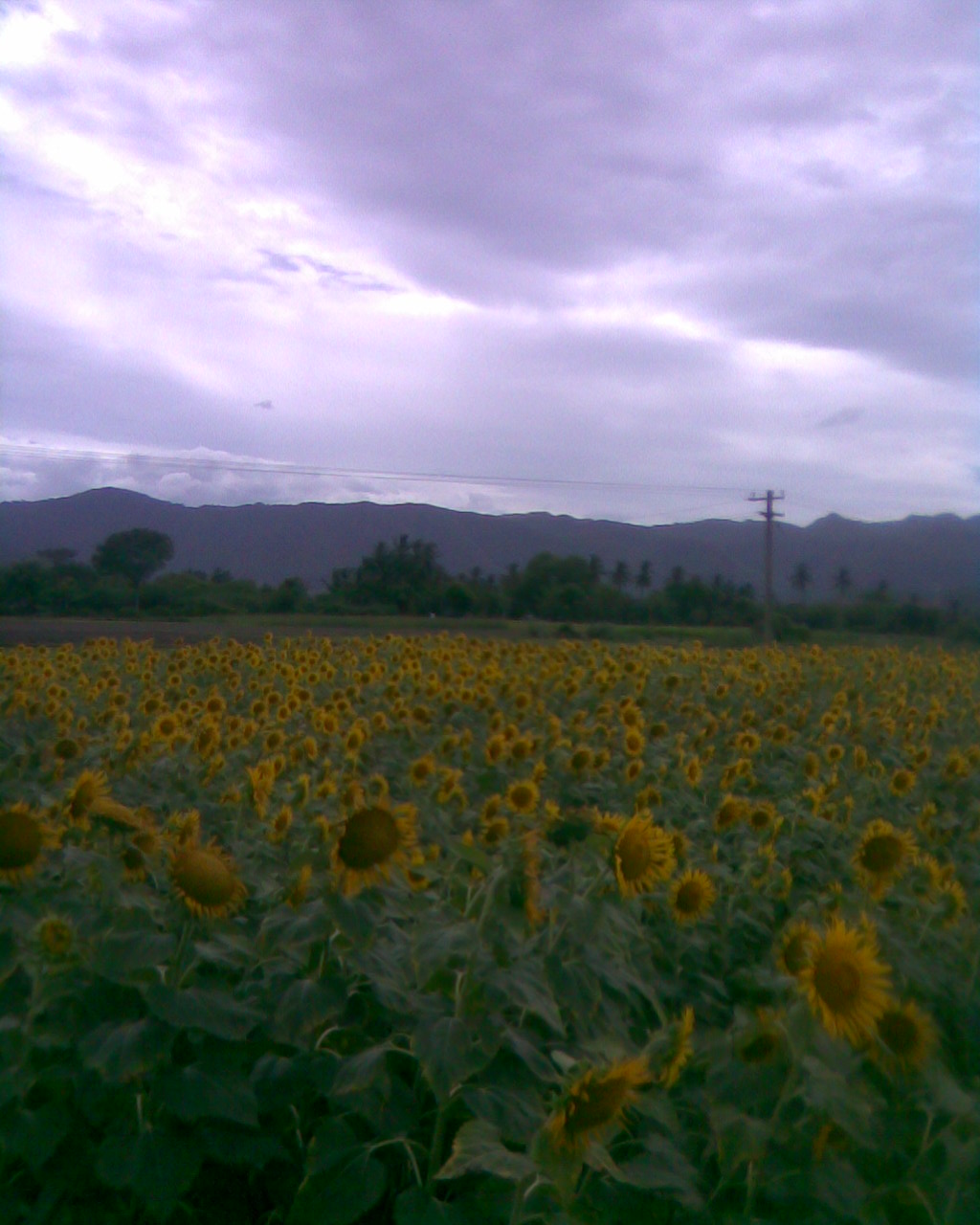
Agriculture is the main occupation of the people in the district

Currently, Perambalur district is the top maize and Onion (small) producer in Tamil Nadu, with 27% and 50% of the state's share, respectively.

Perambalur is planning to set up multi-product SEZ over an area of 5000 acres (20 km^{2}) specializing in high-technology by SREI Infrastructure Finance Ltd through a joint venture with TIDCO (Tamil Nadu Industrial Development Corporation). The SEZ will have linkages to Cuddalore, Pondicherry and Chennai ports, railway line and Tiruchirapalli Airport. This SEZ will bring in high-technology industries, MROs, biotechnology, pharmaceutical companies, textile and leather clusters. Perambalur SEZ has a large hinterland that offers huge labour force. The SEZ is well connected with all major cities/regions of the country with road/rail network. The SEZ will focus on testing and certification facilities, warehouses, infrastructure on demand and so forth. In addition, residential and recreational complexes are planned within the SEZ.

== Industries ==
=== Perambalur Sugar Mills ===
Perambalur Sugar Mills is sugar mill of Perambalur Sugar Mills Limited, a Subsidiary of Tamil Nadu Sugar Corporation Limited (TASCO) located at Eraiyur, Permbalur. It commenced its operation on 1976 and has a capacity of 2500 TCD.

=== MRF Limited ===
MRF Limited commissioned its 8th plant at Naranamangalam, Perambalur on 2011 for the production of conventional tyres. It commissioned its 9th plant at the same facility on 2012 solely for the manufacture of radial tyres.

== Visuvakudi Reservoir ==
Visvakudi dam is located in Visvakudi, Tamil Nadu. Visvakudi dam is constructed across Kallar River, between Vayalar hills and Semmalai. The reservoir can hold 30.67 million cubic feet of water. The dam is 615 metres long. There will be two sluices and radial shutters will be fixed on the two sluices.

== Divisions ==
The district for administrative purpose has been divided into four taluks (Perambalur taluk, Kunnam taluk, Alathur taluk, Veppanthattai taluk) which is further sub-divided into four blocks viz. Perambalur, Veppanthattai, Veppur, Alathur. The district comprises 121 village panchayats, four town panchayats (Kurumbalur, Arumbavur, Poolambadi, Labbaikudikadu) and one municipality.

== Politics ==
District	No.	Constituency	Name	Party	Alliance	Remarks
Perambalur	147	Perambalur (SC)	K. Sivakumar	TVK	TVK+	
Perambalur	148	Kunnam	S. S. Sivasankar	DMK	SPA	

== Demographics ==
Historical population

Year	Pop.	±% p.a.
1901	181,738	—
1911	197,214	+0.82%
1921	205,343	+0.40%
1931	206,731	+0.07%
1941	233,200	+1.21%
1951	266,569	+1.35%

Year	Pop.	±% p.a.
1961	286,739	+0.73%
1971	340,306	+1.73%
1981	382,499	+1.18%
1991	451,032	+1.66%
2001	493,646	+0.91%
2011	565,223	+1.36%

Religions in Perambalur district (2011)
Religion	Percent
Hinduism	92.29%
Islam	5.79%
Christianity	1.82%
Other or not stated	0.10%

According to 2011 census, Perambalur district had a population of 565,223 with a sex-ratio of 1,003 females for every 1,000 males, much above the national average of 929. 17.19% of the population lived in urban areas. A total of 59,567 were under the age of six, constituting 31,135 males and 28,432 females. Scheduled Castes and Scheduled Tribes accounted for 33.01% and 0.46% of the population respectively. The average literacy of the district was 66.49%, compared to the national average of 72.99%. The district had a total of 149,243 households. There were a total of 299,726 workers, comprising 107,542 cultivators, 91,135 main agricultural labourers, 4,365 in house hold industries, 52,055 other workers, 44,629 marginal workers, 9,762 marginal cultivators, 27,143 marginal agricultural labourers, 978 marginal workers in household industries and 6,746 other marginal workers.

Languages of Perambalur district (2011)
1. Tamil (97.9%)
2. Telugu (1.19%)
3. Others (0.89%)

At the time of the 2011 census, 97.92% of the population spoke Tamil and 1.19% Telugu as their first language.

== Transportation ==
The nearest airport to Perambalur District is the Tiruchirappalli International Airport. The district is well connected by Road Network. Some of the notable Busiest National Highways such as NH-38 passes through the center of the District. World peace temple ( Ulaga samathana aalayam) will be built in kottarai village by veerathuravi maamunivar. The District has very less connectivity with Railways. Sillakkudi railway station is the only Railway Station of the district.

== See also ==
- List of districts of Tamil Nadu
