= Adaviyar =

Tamil speaking Hindu caste in Tamil Nadu, South India

Regions with significant populations
- Tirunelveli and Thanjavur districts of Tamil Nadu.

Religion
- Hinduism

Related ethnic groups
- Pattariyar, Kaikolar, Saliya, Padmashaliyar,

Adaviyar (also spelt as Ataviyar) is a Tamil-speaking Hindu caste who were traditionally weavers from Thanjavur and Tirunelveli districts of Tamil Nadu, South India.

In Tamil Nadu they are notified as Other Backward Class by the State government of Tamil Nadu.

== See also ==
- Kaikolar
- Saliya
- Padmasali
- Devanga
