= Tirukkural translations into Saurashtra =

As of 2025, Tirukkural has been translated into Saurashtra twice.

== Background ==
An Indo-Aryan language belonging to the Indo-Iranian branch of the Indo-European language family, Saurashtra, once spoken in the Saurashtra region of Gujarat, is spoken today chiefly by a small population of Saurashtrians settled in parts of Tamil Nadu. With the Saurashtrian language being the only Indo-Aryan language employing a Dravidian script, the population's familiarity with the language resulted in the translation of the Tirukkural in this language spoken by a small number of people.

Tirukkural Payiram—Pitika Pragaranam by S. Sankhu Ram is the first known translation of the Kural text into the Saurashtra language. It was posthumously published in 1980 in Madurai. The work was published again in 1993.

The second translation was released in 2022 by the Central Institute of Classical Tamil (CICT) in Chennai as part of its Ancient Tamil Classics in Translations series. It was translated by T. R. Damodaran.

== Translations ==
| Translation | Chapter 26, பல க^{2}னிக் ஆக்ஷேபண | |
| Translation | Kural 254 (Couplet 26:4) | Kural 258 (Couplet 26:8) |
|---|---|---|
| S. S. Ram, 1980 | த^{3}க்ஷன்ஹரன் காய்மெனதி ஹிம்ஸஹரன் ஹிம்ஸகரன் அர்த்ஹரனு தேஆங்க்^{3} க^{2}னி | சூக்து^{4}வெ சொக்உசித ஸூரின்ஹாத் தெ^{4}ர்னானு ஜீவ்ஜியெ ஆங்கு^{3} சக்னோ |

== See also ==
- Tirukkural translations
- List of Tirukkural translations by language

== Published Translations ==
- Sankhu Ram (Trans.). (1993). Sourashtra Tirukkural (in Tamil Scripts). Madurai: Siddhasramam.
