= Pattegar =

Regions with significant populations
- Gujarat, Maharashtra, Rajasthan, Andhra Pradesh, Karnataka, Telangana, Tamil Nadu, Puducherry

Languages
- Marathi, Saurashtra

Religion
- Hinduism

Related ethnic groups
- Savji

Pattegar (also spelt as Patvegar, Patekar & Pattagar) or Patkar (Khatri) is a Hindu community predominantly residing in the Indian states of Gujarat, Maharashtra, Rajasthan, Karnataka, Andhra Pradesh and Telangana. All of them follow Hinduism and are traditionally silk weavers and dyers. Their principal deity is Shakti.

== Etymology of Patkar and Khatri ==
Patkar and its variants are believed to derive from the word pattu/pat (“silk”). However, the community is also called Khātrī in Gujarat and Maharashtra, a name that they have carried to other states like Andhra Pradesh and Telangana. The Gujarati word Khātrī (IPA: kʰaː.t̪ɾiː) meaning a 'caste of Hindu weavers' is believed to derive from the Sanskrit word kṣattṛ, meaning "carver, distributor, attendant, doorkeeper, charioteer, son of a female slave".

== Origins ==
Modern sources describe Patvegar/Patkar (Pattegar) as immigrant silk weavers from Gujarat who settled first in the Deccan. A Government of India craft study on Ilkal sarees from the Census of India records that “Patvegar are silk ribbon weavers hailing from Gujarat,” situating them in the Ilkal weaving complex of Karnataka. Census India Karnataka’s Tumkur District Gazetteer (1969) likewise calls Patvegar “another class of immigrant weavers” and notes they speak an Indo-Aryan dialect akin to Gujarati and Hindi, reinforcing a western-Indian provenance. Scholars place this movement within a broader Gujarati weaver migration that, over the medieval and early-modern periods, spread from Gujarat into the Deccan and further into South India (Tamil Nadu/Andhra), as mapped in studies of artisanal migrations in Migrations in Medieval and Early Colonial India.

Historian Douglas E. Hanes states that the Patkar/Khatri weavers in Gujarat trace their ancestry to either Champaner (Panch Mahals District) or Hinglaj (Sindh) and the community genealogists believe that the migration happened during the late sixteenth' century.

== Language ==
The Pattegars speak a language called Pattegari or Khatri or Saurashtra, a dialect of Gujarati with the amalgamation of present-day Sanskrit, Hindi, Marathi, Gujarati, Punjabi, Telugu and Kannada.

== Traditional Occupation ==
Historically silk weaving, dyeing, and related textile finishing, with many families continuing dyed/printed silk and cotton work.

== History ==
Suraiya Faroqhi, writes that, in 1742 Gujarat, the Khatris had protested the immigration of Muslim weavers by refusing to deliver cloth to the East India Company. In another case Khatris taught weaving to Kunbis due to receiving excessive orders who soon became strong competitors to the Khatris much to their chagrin. In the mid-1770s, the Mughal governor granted the Kunbi rivals rights to manufacture saris. This licence was later revoked in 1800 due to pressure from the British, after a deal was struck between the Khatris and the East India Company, in which the Khatris would weave only for the EIC until certain quotas were met.

Anthropologist Karve, based on the post-Independence research of castes by a in Konkan, Maharashtra, classified Marathi Khatris (Note: Khatris claimed to live near the Bombay island from at least the mid-1800s and would speak Marathi.) as one of the "professional/advanced castes" as they were doctors, engineers, clerks, lawyers, teachers, etc. during independence. She states that their traditional professions were silk weaving and working as merchants although they had entered other professions later.

== See also ==
- Patnūlkarar
- Pattusali
