= Masarm =

Masaram is an Indian surname associated with the Telugu-speaking Padmashali community. The surname is recorded in parts of Telangana, Andhra Pradesh and Maharashtra.

== Community and historical background ==
The Padmashali community is traditionally associated with weaving, textile production and trade in South India. Its historical roots are particularly connected with the Telugu-speaking regions of Andhra Pradesh and Telangana.

According to Padmashali community traditions, the community traces its spiritual ancestry to Bhavana Rishi and Markandeya. The traditional lineage account describes 101 ancestral Rishi lineages associated with Bhavana Rishi.

Padmashali traditions also include the adoption of certain Brahminical religious practices, including Vedic rituals and the sacred thread in some sections of the community. Community organisations have described its ancestry through Rishi lineages and associated these traditions with Brahminical customs. These are traditional religious and social claims rather than evidence that the community is historically classified as Brahmin or Kshatriya.

== Gotra and lineage ==
In Padmashali community surname and gotra records, the surname Masaram is listed under Mareecha Rushi Gotra, associated with Maharishi Marichi. Gotra is a traditional lineage identifier used in Hindu religious customs and marriage practices.

The community's traditional genealogical system includes several Rishi gotras associated with the Bhavana Rishi lineage.

== Geographic distribution and migration ==
The Masaram surname is recorded in Maharashtra, Telangana and Andhra Pradesh. Surname distribution records show its presence across these states.

Historically, Padmashali weavers migrated from the Telugu-speaking regions of Telangana to western Maharashtra. These migrations were connected with weaving, textile production, trade and changing economic opportunities. Pune and Ahmednagar were among the places where Padmashali families had settled by the late eighteenth century. Migration continued during the nineteenth and twentieth centuries.
