= SKB =

SKB or skb may refer to:

== Organisations ==
- Sayuz na Komunistite v Balgariya, (Union of Communists in Bulgaria)
- SK Broadband, a South Korean telecommunications company
- Skybus Airlines (ICAO code), US
- Streitkräftebasis, a German military logistics branch
- Svensk Kärnbränslehantering Aktiebolag, the Swedish Nuclear Fuel and Waste Management Company

== Other uses ==
- Robert L. Bradshaw International Airport (IATA code), St. Kitts
- S-K-B, US country music group
- S. K. Balakrishnan (1935–2001), former mayor of Madurai, Tamil Nadu, India
- Swedish Polled (Svensk Kullig Boskap), a breed of cattle
- Toyota SKB, a truck

== See also ==
- SKB-Bank Arena, a stadium in Russia
