= Saurashtra script =

Abugida script used for the Saurashtra language

Saurashtra ꢱꣃꢬꢵꢰ꣄ꢜ꣄ꢬ
- Script type: Abugida
- Period: 19th century - present
- Direction: Left-to-right
- Languages: Saurashtra

Related scripts
- Parent systems: Proto-Sinaitic alphabet: Phoenician alphabet; Aramaic alphabet; Brāhmī; Tamil-Brahmi; Pallava; Grantha; Saurashtra
- Sister systems: Malayalam script; Tigalari script; Thirke; Dhives akuru

ISO 15924
- ISO 15924: Saur (344), Saurashtra

Unicode
- Unicode alias: Saurashtra
- Unicode range: U+A880–U+A8DF

The Saurashtra script is an abugida script that is used by Saurashtrians of Tamil Nadu to write the Saurashtra language. The script is of Brahmic origin, although its exact derivation is not known; it was later reformed and standardized by T. M. Rama Rai. Its usage has declined, and the Tamil and Latin scripts are now used more commonly.

== Description and background ==
The Saurashtra Language of Tamil Nadu is written in its own script. In contrast, the inhabitants of Saurashtra utilize the Gujarati script. Because this is a minority language not taught in schools, people learn to write in Saurashtra Script through Voluntary Organisations like Sourashtra Vidya Peetam, Madurai. Saurashtra refers to both the language and its speakers; Saurashtra is also an area in Gujarat, India which was the home of the Saurashtra community prior to their southward migration. Vrajlal Sapovadia describes the Saurashtra language as a hybrid of Gujarati, Marathi and Tamil.

The language has had its own script for centuries, the earliest one available from 1880. Dr. H.N. Randle has written an article 'An Indo-Aryan Language of South India—Saurashtra Bhasha' in the Bulletin of School of Oriental and African Studies (BSOAS) 11 Part 1 p. 104-121 and Part II p. 310-327 (1943–46)Published by Cambridge University Press on behalf of School of Oriental and African Studies. This language is not taught in schools and hence had been confined to being merely a spoken language. But many great works like Bhagavath Gita and Tirukkural were translated into Sourashtram. It is now a literary language. Sahitya Akademi has recognized this language by conferring Bhasha Samman awards to Saurashtra Scholars.

Most Saurashtrians are bilingual in their mother tongue and Tamil and are more comfortable using their second language for all practical written communication though of late, some of them started writing in Sourashtram using Saurashtra script. There is an ongoing debate within the Saurashtra community regarding the use of the script for the Saurashtra language right from 1920 when a resolution was passed to adopt Devanagari Script for Saurashtra Language. Though some of the books were printed in Devanagari script, it failed to register the growth of the language.

But in practice because of lack of printing facilities, books are continued to be printed in Tamil Script with diacritic marks with superscript number for the consonants ka, ca, Ta, ta and pa and adding a colon to na, ma, ra, and la for aspirated forms, which are peculiar to the Saurashtra language. For writing Sourashtram using Devanagari Script, they require seven additional symbols to denote the short vowels 'e' and 'o' and four symbols for aspirated forms viz. nha, mha, rha and lha. They also require one more symbol to mark the sound of 'half yakara' which is peculiar to the Saurashtra language. The books printed in Devanagari Script were discarded because they did not represent the sounds properly.

The Commissioner for Linguistic Minorities, Allahabad by his letter No.123/5/1/62/1559 dated November 21, 1964 Communicated to Sourashtra Vidya Peetam, Madurai that the State Government were of the view that as only one book in Saurashtra Language had so far been submitted by Sourashtra Vidya Peetam for scrutiny, there was no point in examining the merits of only one book specially when the question regarding the usage of script - Hindi or Sourashtram, was still unsettled, and that the question of text books in Sourashtram might well lie over till a large number of books is available for scrutiny and for being prescribed as text books in Schools.

The Leaders in the Community could not realize the importance of teaching of mother tongue in schools and did not evince interest in production of textbooks in Sourashtram for class use. Now an awareness has arisen in the Community, and Sourashtra Vidya Peetam wants to teach the Saurashtra language through multimedia as suggested by Commissioner for Linguistic Minorities in his 42nd Report for the year (July 2003 to June 2004). Of late in internet, many Sourashtra Yahoo groups in their website use the Roman script for the Saurashtra language.

Now the Saurashtra font is available in computers and this enabled the supporters of Saurashtra Script to print books in its own script. An electronic journal, printed in the Saurashtra Script. One journal, Bhashabhimani, is published from Madurai, in Saurashtra Script. Another journal, 'Jaabaali', is also published by the same Editor of Bhashabhimani from Madurai. The 'Zeeg' Saurashtra script practice Magazine is also published from Madurai only. All the three journals support the Saurashtra script only. There is a journal in Devanagari called " Palkar Sourashtra Samachar".

By the effort of All India Sourashtra Madhya Saba, the representation of Saurashtra community of Tamil Nadu, Devnagari script is declared as writing system to Saurashtra language with two addition symbols.

== Script and punctuation ==
=== Consonants ===
The Saurashtra script is an abugida, that is, each of the thirty-four consonants represents a consonant+vowel syllable. An unmarked letter represents a syllable with the inherent vowel, so, for example, the letter is pronounced ka. Letter-order is similar to that used in other Brahmic scripts, organised by manner of articulation, place of articulation, voiced consonant, and aspiration.

Consonants
	Unvoiced		Voiced		Nasal	Approximant	Sibilant	Fricative	Other
	Inaspirate	Aspirated	Inaspirate	Aspirate	Nasal	Approximant	Sibilant	Fricative	Other
velar	ꢒ ka	ꢓ kha	ꢔ ga	ꢕ gha	ꢖ ṅa		ꢒ꣄‍ꢰ kṣa	ꢲ ha	
palatal	ꢗ ca	ꢘ cha	ꢙ ja	ꢚ jha	ꢛ ña	ꢫ ya	ꢯ śa		
retroflex	ꢜ ṭa	ꢝ ṭha	ꢞ ḍa	ꢟ ḍha	ꢠ ṇa	ꢬ ra	ꢰ ṣa		ꢳ ḷa
dental	ꢡ ta	ꢢ tha	ꢣ da	ꢤ dha	ꢥ na	ꢭ la	ꢱ sa		
labial	ꢦ pa	ꢧ pha	ꢨ ba	ꢩ bha	ꢪ ma	ꢮ va			

Nasal or liquid consonants may be marked with diacritic called hāra or upakshara ⟨ꢴ⟩, which indicates aspiration. For example, the letter ⟨ꢪ⟩ ma plus an upakshara ⟨ꢪꢴ⟩ is pronounced mha. If an aspirated nasal or liquid is followed by a vowel other than a, the vowel diacritic is attached to the upakshara, not to the base letter, so, for example, mho is written ⟨ꢪꢴꣁ⟩. Some analyses of the script classify aspirated nasals and liquids as a separate set of discrete letters divided into two parts.

Consonants with upakshara
ꢪꢴ mha	ꢥꢴ nha	ꢬꢴ rha	ꢭꢴ lha	ꢮꢴ vha

Early Saurashtra texts use a number of complex conjunct forms for writing consonant clusters. However, when the script was restructured in the 1880s these were abandoned in favour of a virama diacritic, which silences the inherent vowel of the first consonant in a cluster.

=== Vowels and syllables ===
Saurashtra includes six long vowels, five short vowels, two vocalic consonants, ru and lu which are treated as vowels and may be short or long, and two part-vowels, anusvara ⟨◌ꢀ⟩ ṁ and visarga, ⟨ꢁ⟩ ḥ. Independent vowel letters are used for word-initial vowels. Otherwise, vowels, vocalics, and part-vowels are written as diacritics attached to consonants. Adding a vowel diacritic to a letter modifies its vowel sound, so ⟨ꢒ⟩, ka plus the diacritic ⟨◌ꣁ⟩, gives the syllable ⟨ꢒꣁ⟩, ko. The absence of a vowel is marked with a virāma ⟨◌꣄⟩, for example, ⟨ꢒ⟩, ka plus a virāma ⟨◌꣄⟩ creates an isolated consonant ⟨ꢒ꣄⟩ k.

Short vowels, vocalics, and part-vowels, their diacritics and examples with ⟨ꢒ⟩
ꢂ a	ꢄ i	ꢆ u	ꢈ ru	ꢊ lu	ꢌ e	ꢏ o	◌ (Note: The virama has no independent form because it is not a vowel. It is a diacritic that suppresses a letter's inherent vowel, leaving an isolated consonant.)	◌ (Note: The anusvara and visarga have no independent forms because they can only modify a syllable's vowel.)	◌
◌ (Note: The vowel a has no corresponding diacritic since every consonant carries an inherent a.)	◌ꢶ	◌ꢸ	◌ꢺ	◌ꢼ	◌ꢾ	◌ꣁ	◌꣄	◌ꢀ	◌ꢁ
ꢒ ka	ꢒꢶ ki	ꢒꢸ ku	ꢒꢺ kru	ꢒꢼ klu	ꢒꢾ ke	ꢒꣁ ko	ꢒ꣄ k	ꢒꢀ kaṁ	ꢒꢁ kaḥ

Long vowels and vocalics, their diacritics, and examples with ⟨ꢪ⟩
ꢃ ā	ꢅ ī	ꢇ ū	ꢉ rū	ꢋ lū	ꢍ ē	ꢐ ō	ꢎ ai	ꢑ au
◌ꢵ	◌ꢷ	◌ꢹ	◌ꢻ	◌ꢽ	◌ꢿ	◌ꣀ	◌ꣂ	◌ꣃ
ꢪꢵ mā	ꢪꢷ mī	ꢪꢹ mū	ꢪꢻ mrū	ꢪꢽ mlū	ꢪꢿ mē	ꢪꣀ mō	ꢪꣂ mai	ꢪꣃ mau

=== Punctuation ===
The widely attested Indic punctuation marks danda and double danda are used to mark the end of a sentence or clause. Latin comma, full stop and question mark symbols are also used.

Punctuation marks
꣎ danda	꣏ double danda

== Numerals ==
There is a script-specific set of numbers 0–9, some of which closely resemble Devanagari digits.

Digits 0-9
꣐ 0	꣑ 1	꣒ 2	꣓ 3	꣔ 4	꣕ 5	꣖ 6	꣗ 7	꣘ 8	꣙ 9

== Unicode ==
Saurashtra script was added to the Unicode Standard in April, 2008 with the release of version 5.1.

The Unicode block for Saurashtra is U+A880–U+A8DF:

Saurashtra^{[1]}^{[2]} Official Unicode Consortium code chart (PDF)
	0	1	2	3	4	5	6	7	8	9	A	B	C	D	E	F
U+A88x	ꢀ	ꢁ	ꢂ	ꢃ	ꢄ	ꢅ	ꢆ	ꢇ	ꢈ	ꢉ	ꢊ	ꢋ	ꢌ	ꢍ	ꢎ	ꢏ
U+A89x	ꢐ	ꢑ	ꢒ	ꢓ	ꢔ	ꢕ	ꢖ	ꢗ	ꢘ	ꢙ	ꢚ	ꢛ	ꢜ	ꢝ	ꢞ	ꢟ
U+A8Ax	ꢠ	ꢡ	ꢢ	ꢣ	ꢤ	ꢥ	ꢦ	ꢧ	ꢨ	ꢩ	ꢪ	ꢫ	ꢬ	ꢭ	ꢮ	ꢯ
U+A8Bx	ꢰ	ꢱ	ꢲ	ꢳ	ꢴ	ꢵ	ꢶ	ꢷ	ꢸ	ꢹ	ꢺ	ꢻ	ꢼ	ꢽ	ꢾ	ꢿ
U+A8Cx	ꣀ	ꣁ	ꣂ	ꣃ	꣄	ꣅ									꣎	꣏
U+A8Dx	꣐	꣑	꣒	꣓	꣔	꣕	꣖	꣗	꣘	꣙						
Notes 1.As of Unicode version 17.0 2.Grey areas indicate non-assigned code points
