= Pattusali =

Hindu weavers caste

Regions with significant populations
- Andhra Pradesh, Telangana, Tamil Nadu, Puducherry, Kerala, Karnataka, Odisha, Maharashtra, Gujarat

Languages
- Primary: Telugu; Other languages: Kannada, Saurashtra

Religion
- Hinduism Divisions based on Sampradaya: Shaiva; Vaishnava

Related ethnic groups
- Saliya, Padmasali, Pattegar

Pattusali (also spelt as Pattu Sale, Pattushali, Pata Sali & Patha Sali) is a Hindu community predominantly residing in the Indian states of Andhra Pradesh, Telangana, Tamil Nadu, Puducherry, Karnataka and Gujarat.

They wear the sacred thread, follow Hinduism and are mainly Vaishnavas, though there is a significant proportion of Shaivas as well. They are Telugu speakers and are found largely in the state of Andhra Pradesh particularly in Anantapur, Godavari, Srikakulam, Visakhapatnam and Vijayanagaram districts.

These people specialise in weaving silk used to decorate and worship gods with silk cloth known as Pattu, hence the name Pattusali in Telugu. Traditionally, Pattusalis as the name suggests are confined to weaving only silk and other finer quality of yarn, whereas Padmasalis weave only coarse cloths from cotton, they are often confused with Padmasali while there is no direct connection between their origin or cultures.

== See also ==
- Pattariyar
- Patnūlkarar
- Pattegar
