= Sattaiyampudur =

- Pudur
- Location in Tamil Nadu, India
- Coordinates: 11°22′49.8″N 77°53′42.45″E
- Country: India
- State: Tamil Nadu
- District: Namakkal
- Elevation: 230 m (750 ft)

Population (2011)
  - Total: 2,500

Languages
  - Official: Tamil
- Time zone: UTC+5:30 (IST)
- PIN: 637211
- Telephone code: 91-(0)4288
- Vehicle registration: TN34

Sattaiyampudur (also called Pudur) is a town, on the periphery of Tiruchengode, Namakkal District.

== Economy ==
The major occupation of the people is textile weaving. Gada, dhotis, towels, bedsheets are some of the town's textile products. Major part of the community belong to the kaikolar community, renowned for weaving. Sengunthar Tirumana Mahal Sattaiyampudur - The notable and biggest Tirumana Mandabam in Tiruchengode.

== Festivals ==
- Arulmigu Muthu Kumaraswamy Temple and Arulmigu Muthu Mariamman Temple festival Celebrated during the Tamil month of Maasi.
- Arulmigu Muthu Muniyappan Temple festival Celebrated during the Tamil month of Aadi.

=== Mariamman Festival ===
- Arulmigu Muthu Kumaraswamy Temple and Arulmigu Muthu Mariamman Temple festival was celebrated after 8 years, in 2017. Later celebrated every 2 years.
- Manjalneerattam is a major part of the festival where youth and men splash water with dissolved turmeric, over each other celebrating a good year of weaving. Earlier, folks of the village celebrate the festival dancing around the streets to the drums, which makes it a spectacular event.
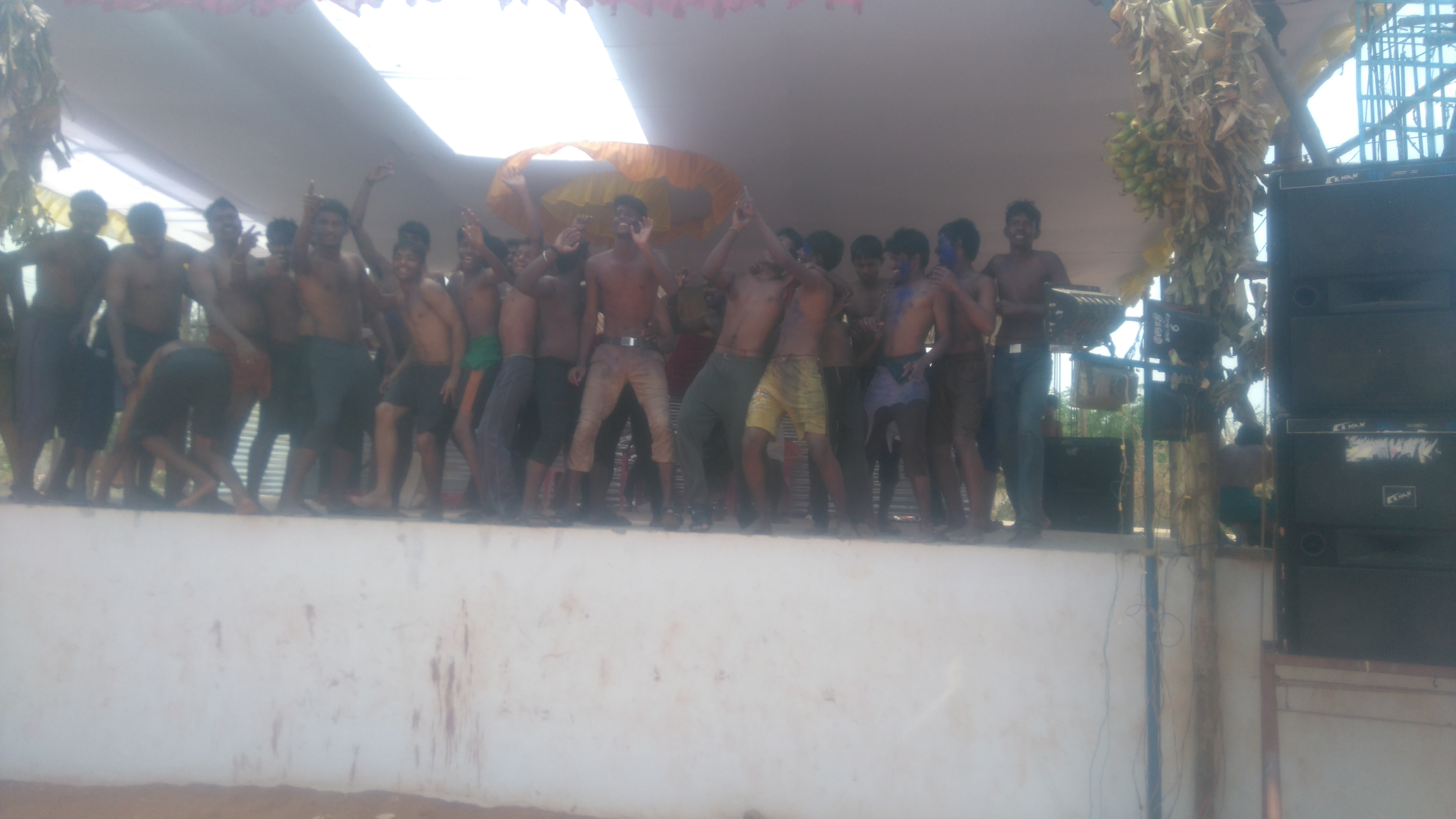
  Manjalneerattam

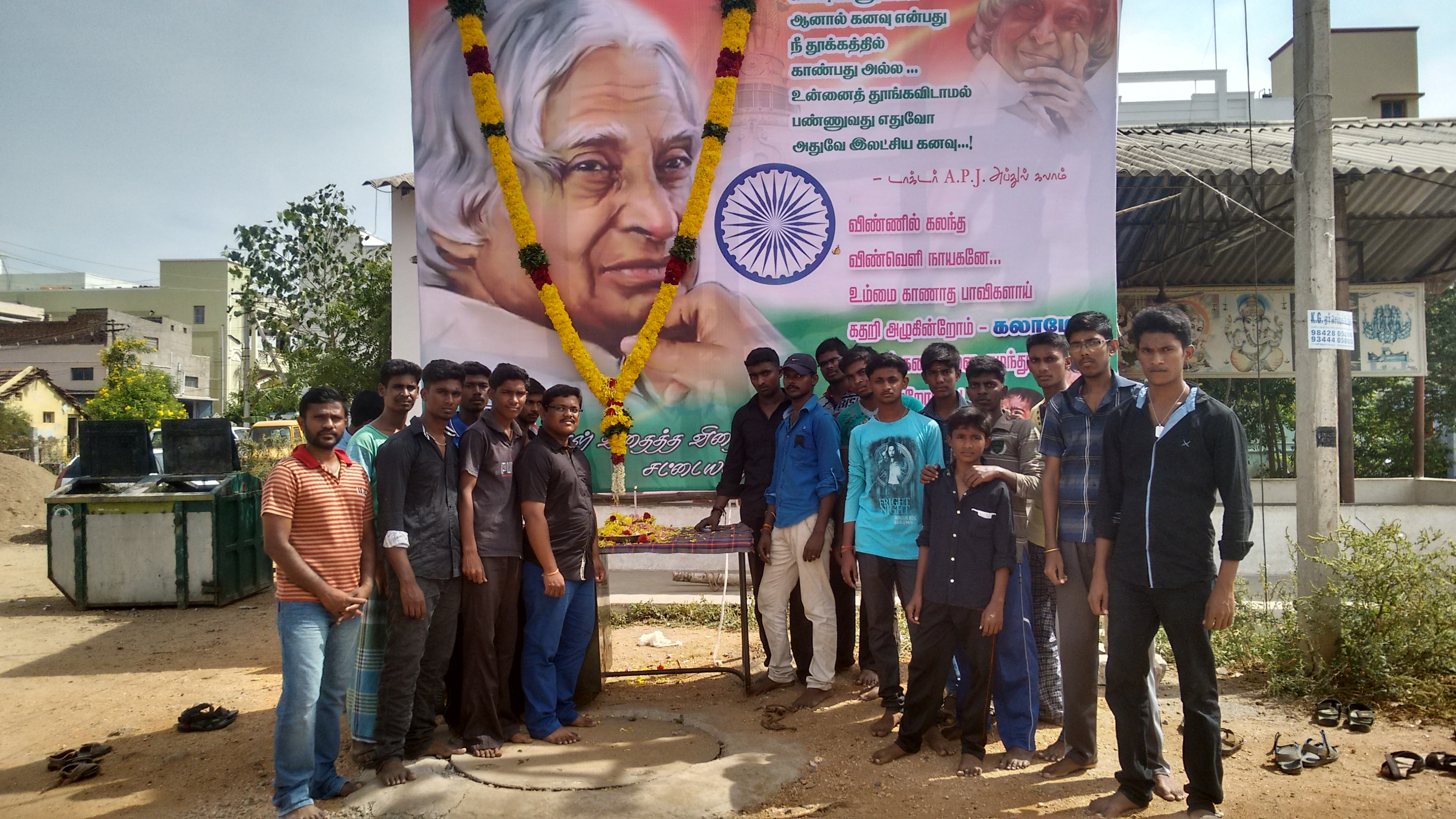
