= Venkataramana Bhagavathar =

Carnatic musician and composer

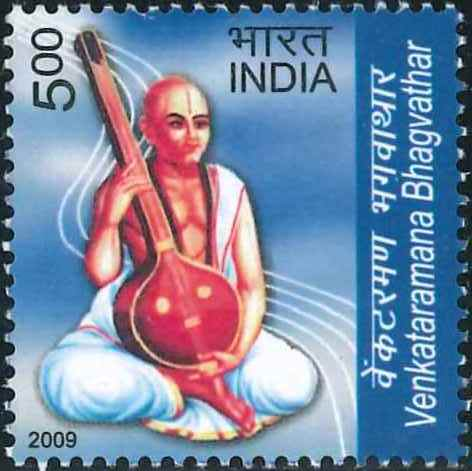
- Born: 18 February 1781; Ayyampettai, Thanjavur district
- Died: 15 December 1874 (aged 93); Wallajapet, Ranipet district
- Other name: Wallajapet Venkataramana Bhagavathar
- Occupation: Carnatic composer

Venkataramana Bhagavathar (1781–1874) was a direct disciple of Saint Thyagaraja and a composer of Carnatic music. Bhagavathar composed his songs in Sanskrit, Telugu and Saurashtra language and has left behind a number of kritis.

== Early life ==
Bhagavathar was born in 1781 to a Saurashtra Brahmin family in Ayyampettai in present-day Thanjavur district of Tamil Nadu. He was born to Nannusamy as a fifth child making him the grandson of Kuppaiyer who was a priest, belonging to Dadheecha gotra from Ariyalur in present-day Tiruchirappalli district. Bhagavathar was a scholar, composed more than 150 keerthanas and is well versed in Sanskrit, Telugu, and Saurashtra. He was one of the prime disciples of Saint Tyagaraja. His son, Krishnaswamy Bhagavathar, was also a disciple of Tyagaraja. It was the father-son duo who preserved many of the keerthanas of Tyagaraja and passed them on to posterity. He is popularly known as Walajahpet Venkataramana Bhagavatar after he settled in Wallajapet, a small town in Vellore district.
