= Saurashtra (Unicode block) =

- Range: U+A880..U+A8DF (96 code points)
- Plane: BMP
- Scripts: Saurashtra
- Major alphabets: Saurashtra
- Assigned: 82 code points
- Unused: 14 reserved code points

Unicode Version History
- 5.1 (2008): 81 (+81)
- 9.0 (2016): 82 (+1)

Unicode documentation
- Code chart ∣ Web page

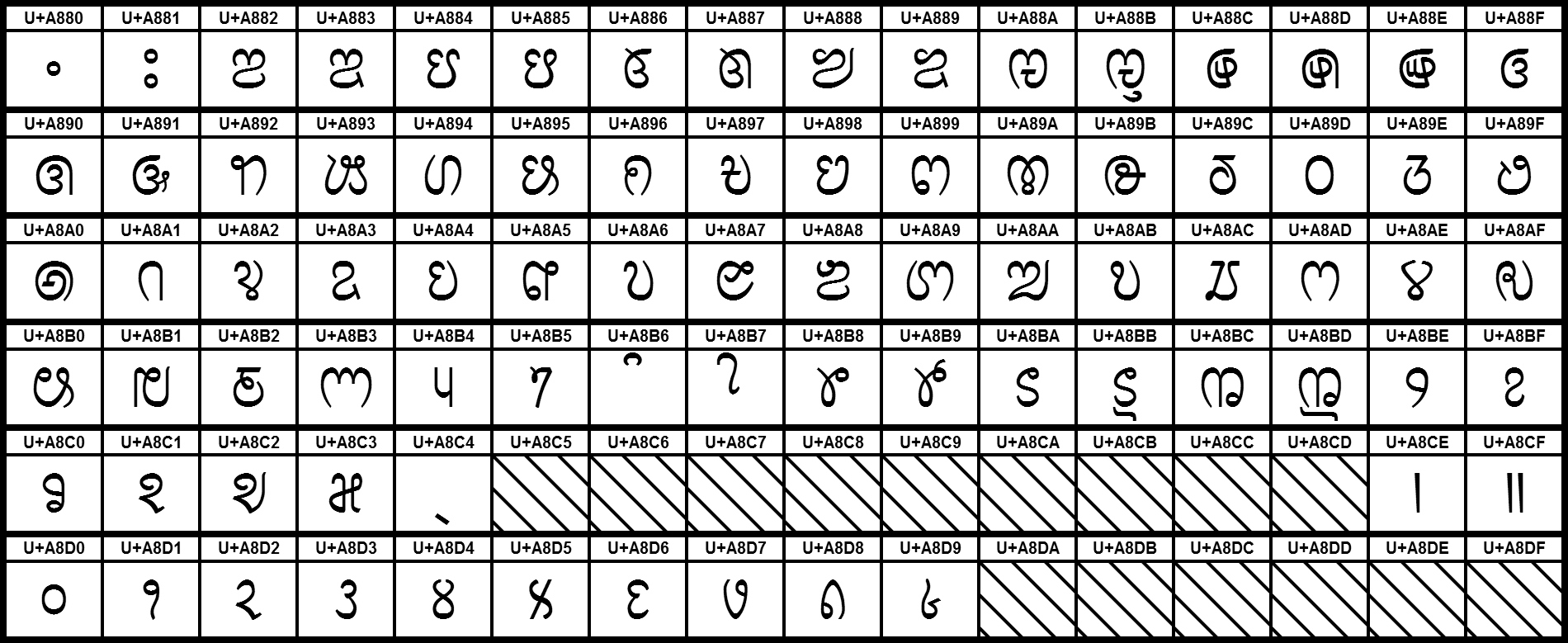
Graphical representation of the Saurashtra Unicode block

Saurashtra is a Unicode block containing characters used up to the late 19th century as a primary script for the Saurashtra language. The Saurashtra Unicode encoding supports both traditional and modern Saurashtra orthographies.

== Block ==
Saurashtra^{[1]}^{[2]} Official Unicode Consortium code chart (PDF)
	0	1	2	3	4	5	6	7	8	9	A	B	C	D	E	F
U+A88x	ꢀ	ꢁ	ꢂ	ꢃ	ꢄ	ꢅ	ꢆ	ꢇ	ꢈ	ꢉ	ꢊ	ꢋ	ꢌ	ꢍ	ꢎ	ꢏ
U+A89x	ꢐ	ꢑ	ꢒ	ꢓ	ꢔ	ꢕ	ꢖ	ꢗ	ꢘ	ꢙ	ꢚ	ꢛ	ꢜ	ꢝ	ꢞ	ꢟ
U+A8Ax	ꢠ	ꢡ	ꢢ	ꢣ	ꢤ	ꢥ	ꢦ	ꢧ	ꢨ	ꢩ	ꢪ	ꢫ	ꢬ	ꢭ	ꢮ	ꢯ
U+A8Bx	ꢰ	ꢱ	ꢲ	ꢳ	ꢴ	ꢵ	ꢶ	ꢷ	ꢸ	ꢹ	ꢺ	ꢻ	ꢼ	ꢽ	ꢾ	ꢿ
U+A8Cx	ꣀ	ꣁ	ꣂ	ꣃ	꣄	ꣅ									꣎	꣏
U+A8Dx	꣐	꣑	꣒	꣓	꣔	꣕	꣖	꣗	꣘	꣙						
Notes 1.As of Unicode version 18.0 2.Grey areas indicate non-assigned code points

== History ==
The following Unicode-related documents record the purpose and process of defining specific characters in the Saurashtra block:

Version	Final code points (Note: Proposed code points and characters names may differ from final code points and names)	Count	L2 ID	WG2 ID	Document
5.1	U+A880..A8C4, A8CE..A8D9	81	L2/03-098	N2549	Krishnamoorty, Jeyakumar Chinnakkonda; Everson, Michael (2002-12-03), Proposal to encode the Saurashtra script in the UCS
5.1	U+A880..A8C4, A8CE..A8D9	81	L2/03-147		Bhaskararao, Peri (2002-12-03), Comments on L2/03-098
5.1	U+A880..A8C4, A8CE..A8D9	81	L2/03-225		McGowan, Rick (2003-07-15), Saurashtra Character Properties
5.1	U+A880..A8C4, A8CE..A8D9	81	L2/03-245		Jeyakumar, C. K. (2003-08-12), Saurashtra "AAYTAM" character information
5.1	U+A880..A8C4, A8CE..A8D9	81	L2/03-231	N2607	Krishnamoorty, Jeyakumar Chinnakkonda; Everson, Michael (2003-08-13), Revised proposal to encode the Saurashtra script in the UCS
5.1	U+A880..A8C4, A8CE..A8D9	81	L2/03-253		Kai, Daniel (2003-08-13), Lepcha, Limbu, Syloti, Saurashtra, Tai Le and Bugis Proposals
5.1	U+A880..A8C4, A8CE..A8D9	81	L2/03-256		Kai, Daniel (2003-08-13), Introduction to the Saurashtra Script
5.1	U+A880..A8C4, A8CE..A8D9	81	L2/03-277	N2620	Bhaskararao, Peri (2003-08-21), Comments on Proposal to Encode the Saurashtra Script in the UCS
5.1	U+A880..A8C4, A8CE..A8D9	81	L2/03-313	N2619	McGowan, Rick (2003-09-17), Saurashtra Script Encoding
5.1	U+A880..A8C4, A8CE..A8D9	81	L2/04-352	N2875 (html, doc)	McGowan, Rick (2004-09-15), Saurashtra Linebreaking and Other Properties
5.1	U+A880..A8C4, A8CE..A8D9	81	L2/05-232		Everson, Michael (2005-08-11), Comments on Saurashtra
5.1	U+A880..A8C4, A8CE..A8D9	81	L2/05-222R2	N2969R2	Everson, Michael; Krishnamoorty, J. C. (2005-09-21), Final revised proposal to encode the Saurashtra script in the UCS
5.1	U+A880..A8C4, A8CE..A8D9	81	L2/05-270		Whistler, Ken (2005-09-21), "K. Saurashtra", WG2 Consent Docket (Sophia Antipolis)
5.1	U+A880..A8C4, A8CE..A8D9	81	L2/05-279		Moore, Lisa (2005-11-10), "Consensus 105-C32", UTC #105 Minutes
5.1	U+A880..A8C4, A8CE..A8D9	81		N2953 (pdf, doc)	Umamaheswaran, V. S. (2006-02-16), "7.4.10", Unconfirmed minutes of WG 2 meeting 47, Sophia Antipolis, France; 2005-09-12/15
5.1	U+A880..A8C4, A8CE..A8D9	81	L2/06-091	N3058	Everson, Michael (2006-03-23), Correction of a Saurashtra character name in PDAM3
5.1	U+A880..A8C4, A8CE..A8D9	81	L2/06-122		Anderson, Deborah; Kai, Ka'ōnohi (2006-04-10), Implementation of the Saurashtra script
5.1	U+A880..A8C4, A8CE..A8D9	81		N3076	Anderson, Deborah; Kai, Ka'ōnohi (2006-04-10), Implementation of the Saurashtra script (N2969R2)
5.1	U+A880..A8C4, A8CE..A8D9	81	L2/06-108		Moore, Lisa (2006-05-25), "Consensus 107-C32", UTC #107 Minutes, "Accept the name of U+A8B4 SAURASHTRA CONSONANT SIGN HAARU."
5.1	U+A880..A8C4, A8CE..A8D9	81	L2/06-251		Ganesan, Naga (2006-07-28), Saurashtran Haaru consonants in Named Sequences list
5.1	U+A880..A8C4, A8CE..A8D9	81	L2/06-252		West, Andrew (2006-07-28), Comments on Capital R Rotunda
5.1	U+A880..A8C4, A8CE..A8D9	81		N3103 (pdf, doc)	Umamaheswaran, V. S. (2006-08-25), "M48.4", Unconfirmed minutes of WG 2 meeting 48, Mountain View, CA, USA; 2006-04-24/27
9.0	U+A8C5	1	L2/14-170		Anderson, Deborah; Whistler, Ken; McGowan, Rick; Pournader, Roozbeh; Iancu, Laurențiu (2014-07-28), "4", Recommendations to UTC #140 August 2014 on Script Proposals
9.0	U+A8C5	1	L2/14-163	N4590	Rajan, Vinodh (2014-08-07), Proposal to encode Saurashtra Sign Candrabindu
9.0	U+A8C5	1	L2/14-177		Moore, Lisa (2014-10-17), "Saurashtra Candrabindu (D.5)", UTC #140 Minutes
9.0	U+A8C5	1	L2/16-052	N4603 (pdf, doc)	Umamaheswaran, V. S. (2015-09-01), "M63.11o", Unconfirmed minutes of WG 2 meeting 63
