= Kaikalas =

Hindu weavers caste

Karikala Bhaktulu
- Religions: Hinduism
- Languages: Telugu
- Populated states: Coastal Andhra and Rayalaseema regions of Andhra Pradesh, Tamilnadu, Pondicherry
- Notable members: List of Sengunthars
- Related groups: Senguntha Mudaliar of Tamilnadu

Kaikalas also known as Karikala Bhaktulu is a Telugu-speaking community. They were warriors by ancient heritage and traditional textile merchants and weavers, by occupation. Kaikalas live in the Coastal Andhra and Rayalaseema regions of the South Indian state of Andhra Pradesh. They are also known as Karikala Bhaktulu, Kaikala, Kaikkolar, Sengundar. In Tamil Nadu, they are known as Senguntha Kaikola Mudaliar, one of the dominant communities during the rule of Imperial Cholas. During the rule of Chola dynasty, they formed major portion of the Chola army and served as soldiers, commanders, chieftains and ministers to Chola emperors. They consider the Chola emperor Karikala Choludu as their hero who is said to have conquered Andhra region around 3rd century CE. After the fall of Chola empire, the community adopted textile businesses and Weaving as full time profession.

The community is divided into sects based on Sampradaya as Shaivas and Vaishnavas. While the Shaivas give preference to worshipping Shiva, the Vaishnavas give preference to worshipping Thirumal.

The Kaikalas form a very important part of the Thathayagunta Gangamma Jatara, the annual folk festival held at Tirupati.

== See also ==
- Sengunthar
- Devanga
- Padmasali
