= Sri Kothanda Ramaswamy Temple =

Temple located in Tamil Nadu, India

Sri Kothanda Ramaswamy Temple is located in Kottar, Kanyakumari district in the Indian state of Tamil Nadu. This is a shrine dedicated to the Hindu deity Rama.

== History ==
The temple is estimated to have been constructed about 150 years ago. Rama, the main idol, is depicted as having a bow (Kothandam), and hence the name Kothandaramaswamy for the idol. The temple is constructed by the Saurashtrians who had come from southern Gujarat to South India in 14th century AD.
