= Nalli (wardrobe store) =

Indian wardrobe store and silk saree emporium

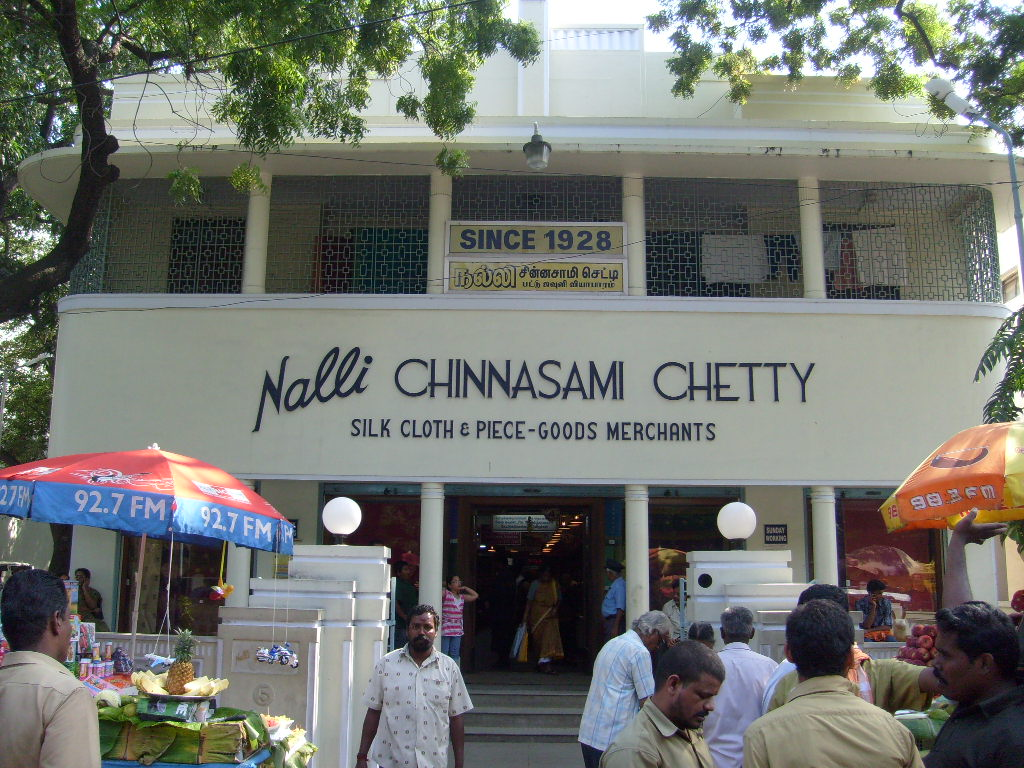
- The main store of Nalli in Panagal Park, Chennai
- Type: Silk sarees
- Genre: Wardrobe store
- Founded: 1928
- Founder: Nalli Chinnasamy Chetti
- Headquarters: Chennai, India
- Number of locations: Chennai, New Delhi, Mumbai, Bengaluru, Hyderabad, Kochi, Kolkata, Ahmedabad, Coimbatore, Madurai, Tiruchirappalli, Kanchipuram, Puducherry, U. S. A., Singapore
- Area served: India

Nalli is an Indian wardrobe store and silk saree emporium based in Chennai. It is one of the oldest saree shops in the Chennai's commercial neighbourhood of T. Nagar.

== History ==
Nalli was established in T. Nagar in 1928 by Nalli Chinnasamy Chetti, a weaver who belonged to the Padmasali community. Chinnasamy Chetti was a famous weaver of Kanchipuram sarees who had been weaving silk sarees since 1900 and gifted a Kanchipuram saree, the Durbar Pet, as a souvenir to George V during his visit to India in 1911. In 1928, he moved to the then Madras and became one of the first to open a shop in the neighbourhood of T. Nagar which was founded in the early 1920s. The shop initially functioned from a house until Nalli established his own showroom in 1935. Nalli Chinnasamy Chetti died in 1958 and was succeeded by his grandson Nalli Kuppusamy Chetti.
