= Nalli Kuppuswami Chetti =

Indian businessman and philanthropist

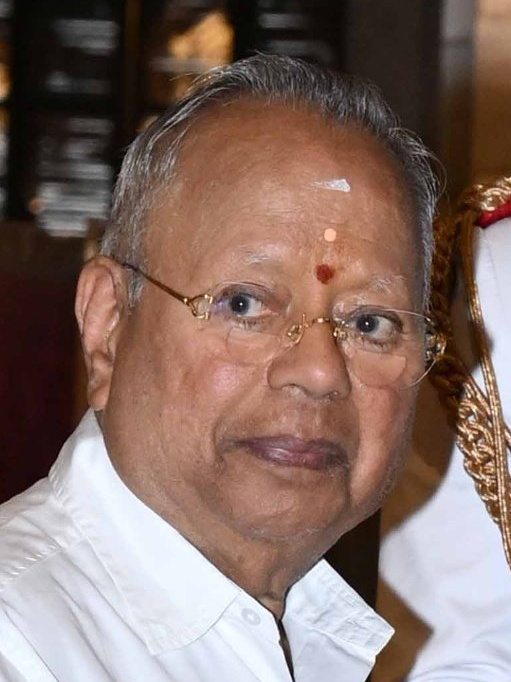
- Chetti in 2025
- Born: 9 November 1940 (age 85); Kanchipuram, Tamil Nadu, India
- Education: Business Management
- Alma mater: University of Washington
- Occupations: Industrialist, philanthropist
- Organization: Nalli
- Known for: Chairmanship of Nalli Silks
- Children: Ramanathan Nalli, Vishwanathan Nalli, Geetha Devi, Jayashree
- Awards: Padma Bhushan (2025); Padma Shri (2003); Kalaimamani (2000); Employer-Employee Relationship Award (2006)

Nalli Kuppuswami Chetti (born 9 November 1940) is an Indian textile industrialist and philanthropist. He is the chairman of Nalli Silks, a major saree retail chain based in Chennai. Known for his patronage of the arts and education, Chetti has contributed extensively to cultural institutions and literary works. He has authored 68 Tamil books, including Vetrikku Moondre Padigal, Needhi Noolgalil Nirvagam, and Padagacheri Mahan.

== Early life and education ==
Chetti was born in Kanchipuram, Tamil Nadu, into a Padmasali weaving community. He studied at the Ramakrishna Mission School and pursued business management at the University of Washington.

== Career ==
After the death of his grandfather, Nalli Chinnasamy Chetti, in 1958, Chetti took over the family-run Nalli Silks and expanded it into a nationally recognized brand in traditional Indian textiles.

== Cultural involvement ==
He is closely associated with several cultural and music organizations. He serves as:

- President of Sri Krishna Gana Sabha, Sri Parthasarathy Swami Sabha, Brahma Gana Sabha, Sri Bhairavi Gana Sabha, Mudhra, Mylapore Fine Arts Club, and Chennai Cultural Academy.
- Vice President of the Madras Film Society and the Mylapore Academy.
- Patron of the Tamil Chamber of Commerce.

== Positions held ==
Position	Organization
Chairman	Nalli Silks

== Awards and recognition ==
Year	Award	Awarding body
2025	Padma Bhushan	Government of India
2006	Employer-Employee Relationship Award	The Rotary Club of Madras
2003	Padma Shri	Government of India
2000	Kalaimamani	Government of Tamil Nadu
