= Sankhu Ram =

- Born: S. S. Ram; 6 April 1907; Madurai
- Died: 26 April 1976
- Occupation: Poet
- Known for: Translating the Kural into Sourashtra

Sankhu Ram (6 April 1907 – 26 April 1976), also known as S. S. Ram, was an Indian poet of Sourashtra language. He is best known for translating the Tirukkural into Sourashtra.

== Biography ==
Sankhu Ram was born in Meenakshipuram in the eastern part of Madurai to Sourashtrian parents Sankhu Subbhuramaiyer and Nagammal. He was associated with the Madurai Sourashtra Sugunodhaya Nataka Sabha under the mentorship of V. A. Venkateshwara Baghavathar and Vasthukavi Viprabhandhu G. V. Padhmanabha Iyer, where he authored several plays, dialogues, and lyrics for Sourashtrian dramas. He learnt Tamil under Appan Iyengar of the Madurai Tamil Sangam. He also penned several patriotic songs, nalangu songs for weddings and various scripts for invitation cards. He also wrote the history and hymns on the deity of the Srinivasa Temple in his neighbourhood. Upon the request of one of his gurus, he translated the Kural text into Saurashtra. However, he died in 1976, before the publication of his translation. The work was published posthumously in 1980.

== Literary works ==
Below is a list of literary works of Sankhu Ram:

- Gnanamritha Geetham (Saurashtra)
- Shiddhashrama Prabhaavam (Saurashtra)
- Tamil Commentary of Sourashtra Neethi Sambu
- Sourashtra Tirukkural

== See also ==
- Tirukkural translations
- Tirukkural translations into Saurashtra
- List of translators
