= Sengunthar =

Hindu caste of Kaikolar warriors and textile merchants

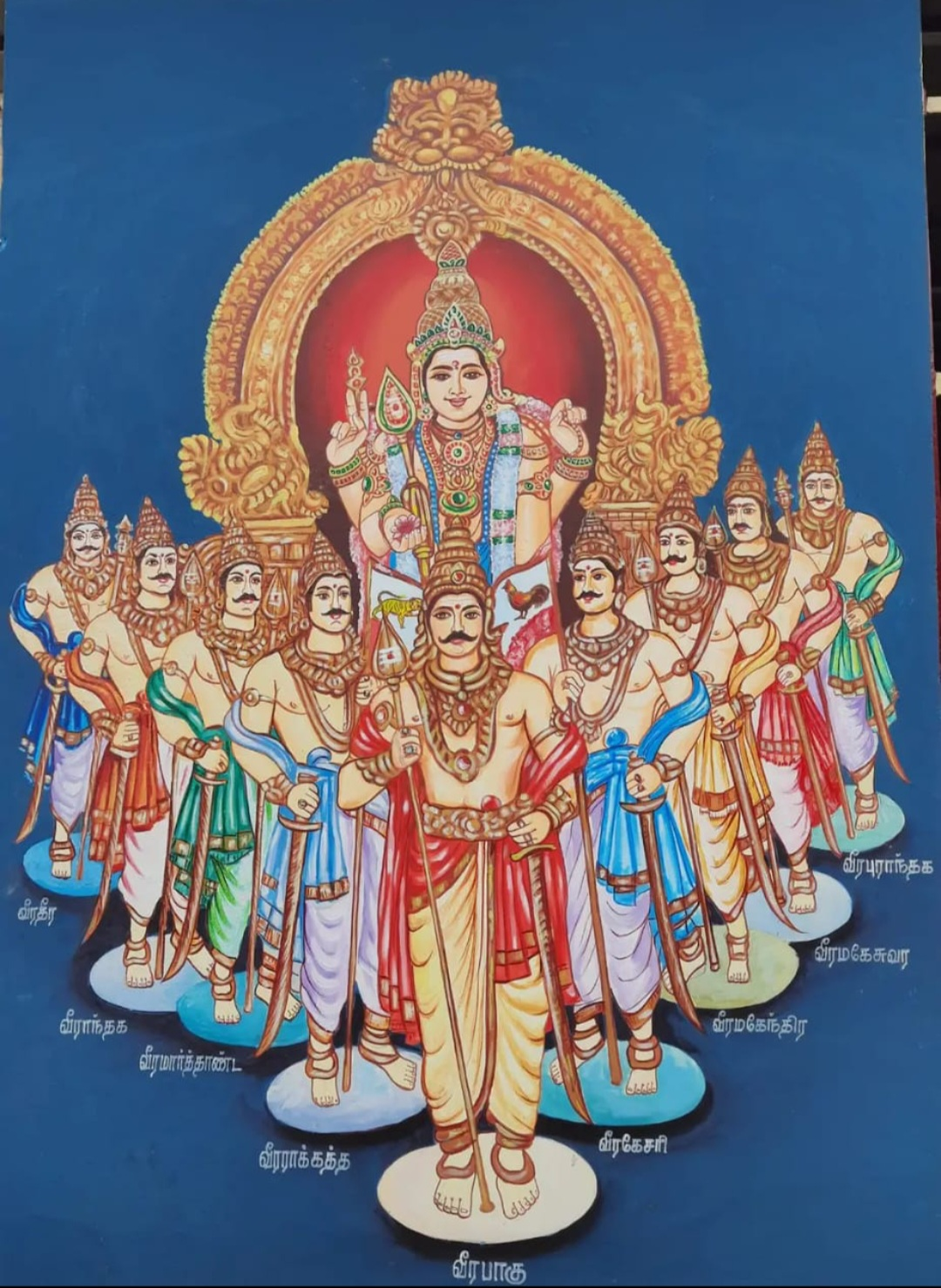
- Virabahu and 8 other Navaveerargal under Lord Kartikeya on the wall of Chidambaram temple
- Kuladevta (male): Kartikeya
- Kuladevi (female): Kamakshi Amman, Angalamman Parameswari
- Religions: Hinduism
- Languages: Tamil
- Populated states: Tamil Nadu, Andhra Pradesh, Pondicherry, Sri Lanka
- Feudal title: Mudaliar, Cholagangan, Brahmmarayan, Vijayarayan
- Notable members: List of Sengunthars
- Related groups: Kaikalas of Andhra

Sengunthar ([sɛŋkʊnʈɻ]), also known as the Kaikolar and Senguntha Mudaliar, is a caste commonly found in the Indian states of Tamil Nadu and Andhra Pradesh and the country of Sri Lanka. In Andhra Pradesh, they are known as Kaikala or Karikala Bhaktulu, who consider the early Chola emperor Karikala Chola as their hero. They were warriors of Cholas and traditionally textile merchants or silk weavers by occupation. Ottakoothar, a 12th-century court poet and rajaguru of Cholas under the reigns of Vikrama Chola, Kulothunga Chola II, and Rajaraja Chola II is also a part of this caste. They were a part of the Ayyavolu 500 merchant guild during the Chola period which played a significant role in the Chola invasion of Srivijaya empire. In the olden days in India, Sengunthars were warriors and were given the title Mudaliar for their bravery. In the early thirteenth century, after the fall of Chola Empire, a large number of Kaikolars migrated to Kongu Nadu from Tondaimandalam and started doing weaving and textile businesses as their full time profession due to their oath to only serve Chola emperors. In the present day, most of the textile businesses in Tamil Nadu are owned by Senguntha Mudaliars. The majority of Sengunthars are sub-divided into numerous clans based on a patrilineal lineage known as Koottam or Gotra.

== Etymology ==
The name Kaikkolar comes from the words kai (hand) and kol (a shuttle used in looms). The appended -ar means people. Kaikkolar can also mean men with stronger arms.

Sengunthar means red spear people, which is a reference to Lord Murugan, who is also known as the red god. According to legends, there were nine commanders called Navaveerargal in Murugan's army, and Sengunthars descended from them.

In ancient times they were also known as Kaarugar (weaver), Thanthuvayar (weaver), Senguntha padaiyar (soldiers), Senaithalaivar (army commander) and Kaikolar (weaver).

Sengunthars were given the title Mudaliar for their bravery. The 12th century Chola emperor's court poet and minister Ottakoothar's Itti Elupatu, a panegyric on the bravery and prowess of arms of Kaikkola warriors, says they were known as Mudaliars during the Imperial Chola period.

Mudali means first, suggesting that the title bearer is of the first-ranked among people. They also used the title Nayanar after their names.

== History ==
=== Origin ===
In mythology, Shiva was enraged against the giants who harassed the people of the earth and sent forth six sparks of fire from his eyes. His wife, Parvati, was frightened, and retired to her chamber and dropped nine beads from her anklets while doing so. Shiva converted the beads into nine females, who each birthed one hero. These nine heroes (Navaveerargal), namely Virabahu, Virakesari, Viramahendrar, Viramaheshwar, Virapurandharar, Viraraakkathar, Viramaarthandar, Viraraanthakar and Veerathirar, with the god of war Kartikeya at their head, marched in command of a large force and destroyed the demons. The Sengunthar claim to be the descendants of these warriors. After killing the demon, the warriors were told by Shiva that they must adopt a profession which would not involve the destruction or injury of any living creature. They were trained in weaving. Chithira Valli, the daughter of Virabahu, one of the nine heroes, married King Musukuntha Chola. The descendants of the nine heroes and King Musukuntha are claimed to be the first generation of Sengunthars.

=== Chola period ===
The earliest literary evidence about Sengunthars occurs in Adhi Diwakaram, a Tamil lexicon written by Sendan Diwakarar. This dictionary, probably from the 8th century CE, refers to them as weavers and army commanders, which may be indicative of their dual role in society at that time.

Cholan Poorva Pattayam, a copper-plate inscription, reveals information about Karikala Chola, the conquest of the Kongu region, and the settling of the colonies with various occupational castes like Sengunthars. During this period, Sengunthars received the title of Samaya Senapati, meaning commander or head.

Inscriptions from the 11th century suggest that by the time of the Chola dynasty, the Sengunthar had already developed its involvement in weaving and trading, together with a role in military matters that was probably necessary to protect those interests. They were a part of the Ayyavole 500 trading group during the Chola period. There are also references in the 12th century suggesting they had armies and that some specific people were assigned to act as bodyguards for the Chola emperors. Such historical records emphasise their military function, with the poet Ottakoothar glorifying them and suggesting that their origins lay with the armies of the gods.

They were militarized during the Imperial Chola period, when some of them held the title Brahmadaraya or Brahmmarayan, which was usually reserved for high-ranking Brahmin officials in the Chola government. They had also used the title 'Chola Gangan' from the evidence "Kaikolaril Kali Avinasi Yaana Ellam Valla Chola Gangan", which was only used by the royal families of the chola dynasty.

Some were chieftains and commanders-in-chief of the later Cholas. Kaikkolar commanders-in-chief were known as Samanta Senapathigal or Senaithalaivar.

In the early thirteenth century a large number of Kaikolars migrated to Kongu Nadu from Tondaimandalam after the fall of the Chola Empire.

=== Vijayanagara period ===
After the 13th century, Sengunthars became associated with weaving completely. During the reign of Sadasiva Raya in the Vijayanagara Empire, the priests of the Brahmapuriswara temple made an agreement that they would cultivate certain lands of the Kaikkolar regiment.

In 14th century, Kottaiyannan Mudaliar, a chieftain who was ruling Namakkal and surrounding regions fought against Muslim invaders when they invaded south India. Chandramathi Mudaliar was a 17th-century Tamil chieftain and ruler of south Kongu Nadu (Erode region) who fought many battles against the Madurai Nayak.

Sengunthars attained positions of responsibility at the two major Vaishnavite temples of Srirangam and Tirupati. In Tirupati, they were in charge of distributing the consecrated food offerings to the worshippers. Many Sengunthar families were rich enough to contribute both land and gold to temples.

In the 16th century, some of the Sengunthar migrated to Kerala from Tamil Nadu.

Multiple clans of Sengunthars were appointed as poets for 24 provinces of Kongu Mandalam for their proficiency in the Tamil language. These poets were granted rights over land, tax, and ritual privilege during festive occasions for their service.

== Traditions and festivals ==
Among Sengunthars, abstaining from alcohol and sex is valued. Meat eating, blood sacrifice, spirit possession, and the worship of small gods are all prominent. Sengunthars practice both vegetarian and non-vegetarian traditions.

Each family (kulam) of the Sengunthar had their own Kula Deivam (deity). Sengunthars share Murugan as a common deity and additionally have any one of several other deities, such as Angalamman or Ambayamman.

The Sura Samharam festival is a traditional ritual where Sengunthars dress as the lieutenants of Karthikeya and re-enact the killing of the demon Suran.

=== Tamil Nadu ===
Sengunthars have rights to hold festivals at Dhandayuthapani Swamy Temple at Palani, the third of the six abodes of Lord Murugan because they are descendants of the nine original heroes who helped Lord Murugan at the battle of Sura Samharam. During the festival, according to a traditional ritual, Sengunthars dress as the nine lieutenants of Murugan and re-enact the killing of the demon Suran in the temple.

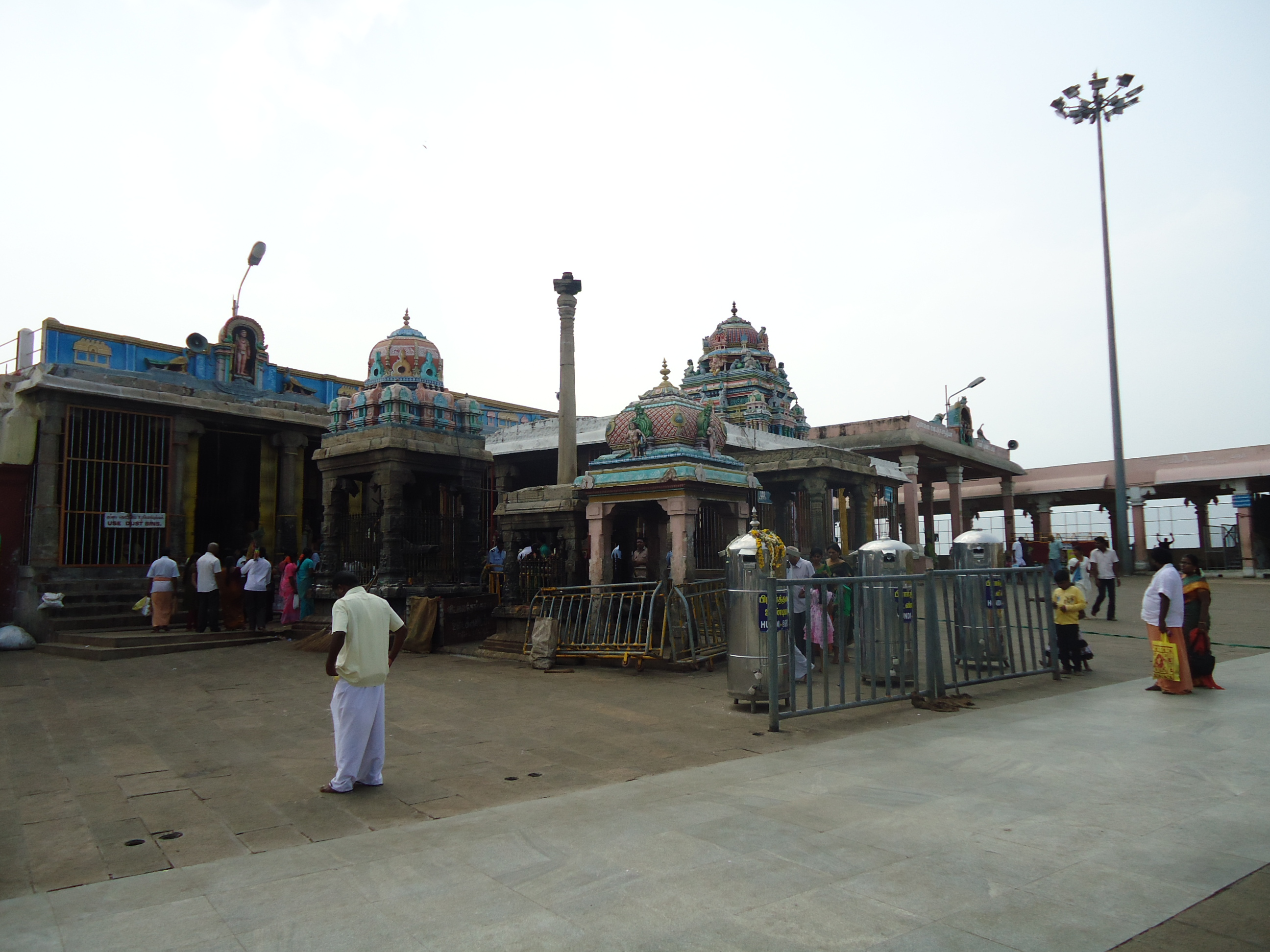
Shri Arulmigu Dhandayuthapani Swamy Temple in Dindigul, Tamil Nadu

=== Andhra Pradesh ===
In Andhra Pradesh, Sengunthars are also known as Kaikalas or Karikala Bhakthulu. They consider the early Chola emperor Karikala Chola as their hero. Karikala Chola is said to have conquered the Andhra region around the 3rd century CE and converted forest lands in the state into agricultural lands. There is a bronze statue of Karikala Chola and a Satram in his name at Srisailam. The Kaikalas form a part of the Thathayagunta Gangamma Jatara, the annual folk festival held at Tirupati.

=== Sri Lanka ===
In the flag hoisting ceremony at the Nallur Kandaswamy temple, the Sengunthar families who were military heroes in the old Jaffna Kingdom have rights to bring out the temple flag and carry it at the Sura Samharam festival. During the flag ceremony, the houses of Sengunthars are decorated with curtains which have pictures of the rooster, the vehicle of Lord Murugan.

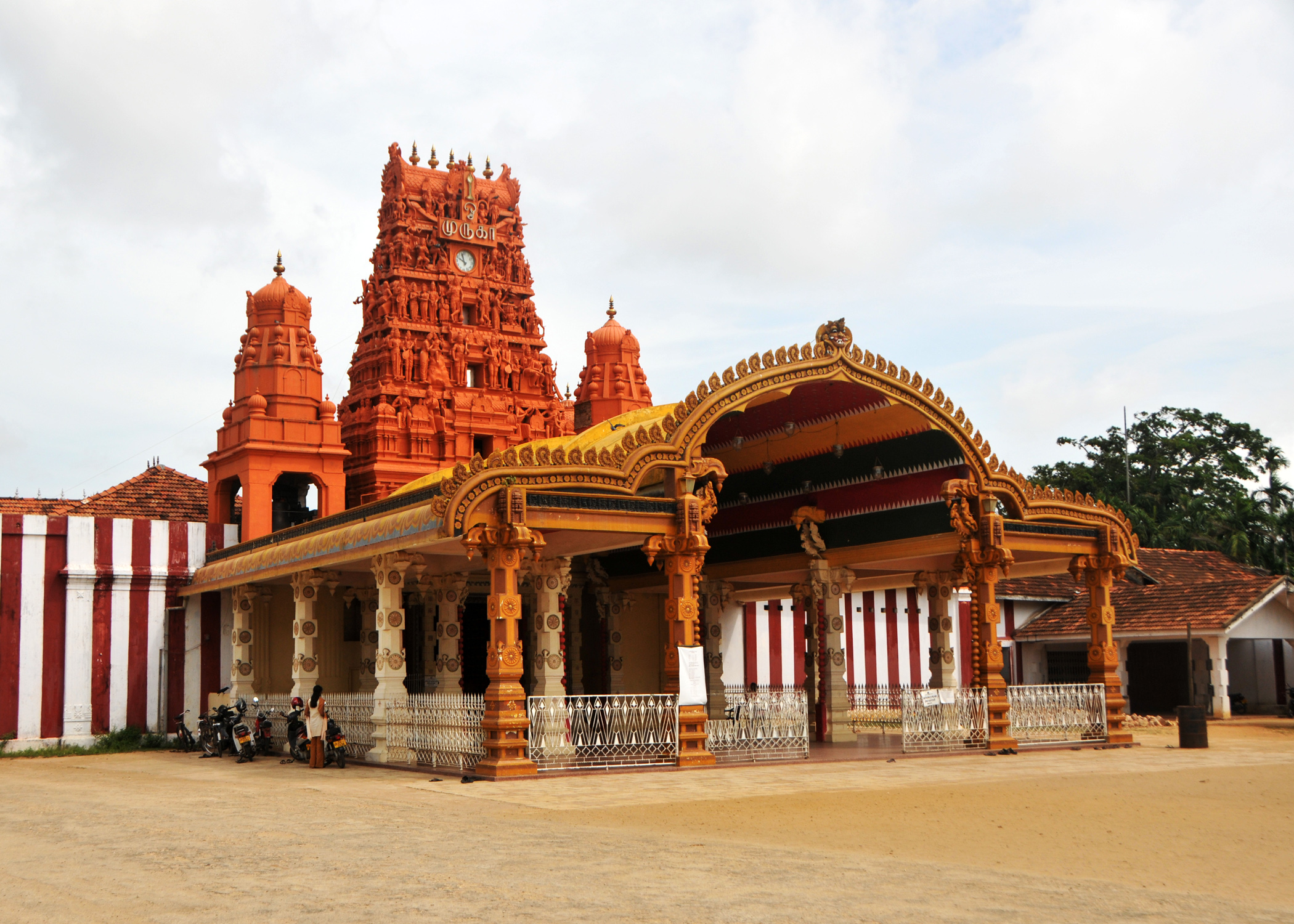
Kandaswamy Kovil in Nallur, Sri Lanka

== Subgroups ==
There are subgroups of the caste based on their traditions.

=== Siru Thaali Kaikolar ===
Siru Thaali Kaikolar, also known as Saami Katti Kaikolars, are characterized by a lingam tied to their arm, a custom that is now defunct. Women of this subclass wear small size of the Mangala Sutra. Due to this, the Mangala Sutra is also called a Thali, from the name of the subclass. They are mainly found in the Erode, Salem and Namakkal districts.

=== Perun Thaali Kaikolar or Kongu Kaikolar ===
Perun Thaali Kaikolars are also known as Kongu Kaikolars and Vellai Seelai Kaikkolars. Women of this section wear a big size of the Mangala Sutra or Thali. Widows belonging to this sub-class wear white saris. They are mainly found in Coimbatore and the Bhavani River Belt in Erode.

=== Rattukaara Kaikolar ===
Rattukaarar, also known as Rendukaarar, are traditional carpet makers. They are mainly found in the western region of Tamil Nadu in the Chola Nadu.

=== Thalaikooda Mudaliyar ===
Thalaikooda Mudaliyar are originally from Koorainaadu in the Tanjore district of Chola Nadu. Today, they can be found in Pondicherry.

=== Maduraiyar ===
Maiduraiyars are from Pandya Nadu. They wear the Meenakshi Sundareswarar thali.

== Current status ==
Sengundhars are a relatively high ranking caste who are close in the status to the Vellalars. They are currently listed as a Backward Class (BC) in both Tamil Nadu and Andhra Pradesh, where they are provided certain reservations in education and public employment.

The Government of Kerala has not listed the Sengunthar community in the state's Backward Class list. According to the Kerala government's official stance, Sengunthars are not considered socially or economically backward. However, the Kaikolan community is mentioned in the Other Backward Castes list for both state and central-level reservations in Kerala.

== Literary references ==
- Senguntha Prabanda Thiratu is a collection of various literary works written about Kaikkolars. It was originally published by Vannakkalanjiyam Kanji Shri Naagalinga Munivar in 1926 and republished in 1993 by Sabapathi Mudaliar. The collection contains:
- Senkunthar Pillai Tamizh by Gnanaprakasa Swamigal, Tirisirapuram Kovintha Pillai and Lakkumanaswami. A collection of songs about the Sungunthars, taken from palm-leaf manuscripts, that was first published in the 18th century in Kanchipuram
- Eetti Ezhubathu, the main literary work about Sengunthars. It comprises poetry by Ottakkoothar written in the 12th century CE during the reign of Rajaraja Chola II. It describes the mythical origin of Sengunthar, expeditions of Sengunthar chieftains and also praises the 1008 Kaikolar who were beheaded trying to enable it to be written.
- Ezhupezhubathu, a sequel to Eetti Ezhubathu written by Ottakkoothar. In this work, he prays the goddess Saraswathi to reattach the heads of the 1008 Sengunthars to their respective bodies.
- Kalipporubathu, a collection of ten stanzas compiled by Kulothunga Chola III. These stanzas were written after Ezhupezhubathu to express joy when the 1008 heads were reattached. These stanzas include the songs who witnessed it in the court of Raja Raja II including himself which was later compiled by his successor Kulothunga Chozha III
- Thirukkai Vazhakkam, which describes the good deeds of Sengunthars and their Saivite religious principles. It was written by Puhalendi.
- Sengunthar Silaakkiyar Malai was written by Kanchi Virabadhra Desigar. It describes the legends and eminent personalities of the Sengunthar community.

== See also ==
- Adaviyar
- Padmashali
- Tanti
- Kaikalas
- Salagama
- Pattusali
- List of Sengunthars

== Notes ==
- Mines, Mattison (1984). The Warrior Merchants: Textiles, Trade and Territory in South India. Cambridge University Press. ISBN 9780521267144.
