= Nesa Nayanar =

Nesa Nayanar, also known as Sivanesa Nayanar, Neca Nayanar (Necha nayanar), Nesanar, Nesar and Nesan (Necan), was a Nayanar saint, venerated in the Hindu sect of Shaivism. He is generally counted as the fifty-ninth in the list of 63 Nayanars. Nesa Nayanar is described to be a weaver, who was always engrossed in remembering his patron god Shiva and gifting clothes he knit to devotees of the deity.

== Life ==
The life of Nesa Nayanar is described in the Periya Puranam by Sekkizhar (12th century), which is a hagiography of the 63 Nayanars. Sekkizhar devotes five stanzas describing the life of the Nayanar saint.

Nesa Nayanar was born in Kampili (Kambili). Kambili is now situated in Bellary district of the Indian state of Karnataka. Nesa Nayanar is said to have been born in Kampili.

Nesa Nayanar was a Saliyar, a member of the Saliyar caste. His family as well as Nesa Nayanar practised the traditional occupation of weaving. He was a devout devotee of Shiva, the patron god of Shaivism. His mind is said to always be concentrated on Shiva. Nesa Nayanar used to continuously chant the Panchakshara mantra in honour of Shiva. He wove clothes, cut-pieces as well as Kowpeenams (loin-cloth). Though he was not wealthy, Nesa Nayanar used to generously donate clothes to devotees of Shiva. His deeds resulted in the favour of Shiva. By his grace, Nesa Nayanar reached Kailash, the abode of the god after death.

Swami Sivananda cites Nesa Nayanar to explain the importance of the practice of Japa, which involves repetition of a mantra or a name of a chosen deity. Sivananda also suggests that the Nayanar practised the Yoga of Synthesis, which involves combining four types of yoga: karma (actions), bhakti (devotion), jnana (knowledge) and Raja yoga (form of meditation) - as a means to achieve God.

== Remembrance ==
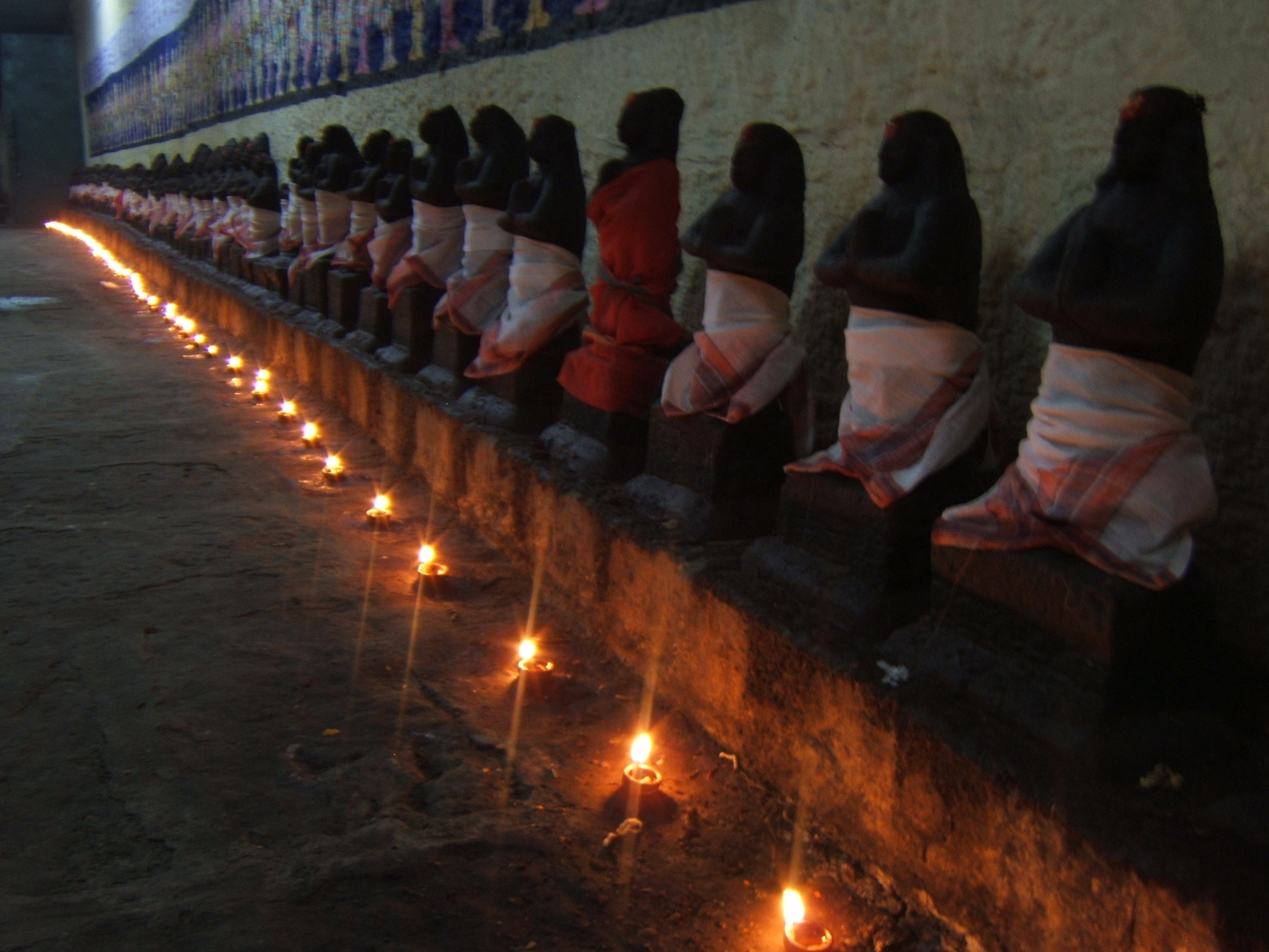
The images of the Nayanars are found in many Shiva temples in Tamil Nadu.

One of the most prominent Nayanars, Sundarar (8th century) venerates Nesa Nayanar in the Tiruthonda Thogai, a hymn to Nayanar saints.

Nesa Nayanar is worshipped specially in the Tamil month of Panguni, when the moon enters the Rohini nakshatra (lunar mansion). Weavers of Koorai Nadu in Mayiladuthurai especially worship him on this day. A temple in Koorai Nadu is said to have images of Shiva's sons Ganesha and Kartikeya, which were brought by Nesa Nayanar to the place.

In depictions as part as of the Nayanars, Nesa Nayanar is depicted with folded hands (see Anjali mudra). In individual depictions of his life, the Nayanar is depicted distributing garments to devotees of Shiva or as engrossed in weaving. He receives collective worship as part of the 63 Nayanars. Their icons and brief accounts of his deeds are found in many Shiva temples in Tamil Nadu. Their images are taken out in procession in festivals.
