= Virabahu =

Hindu deity

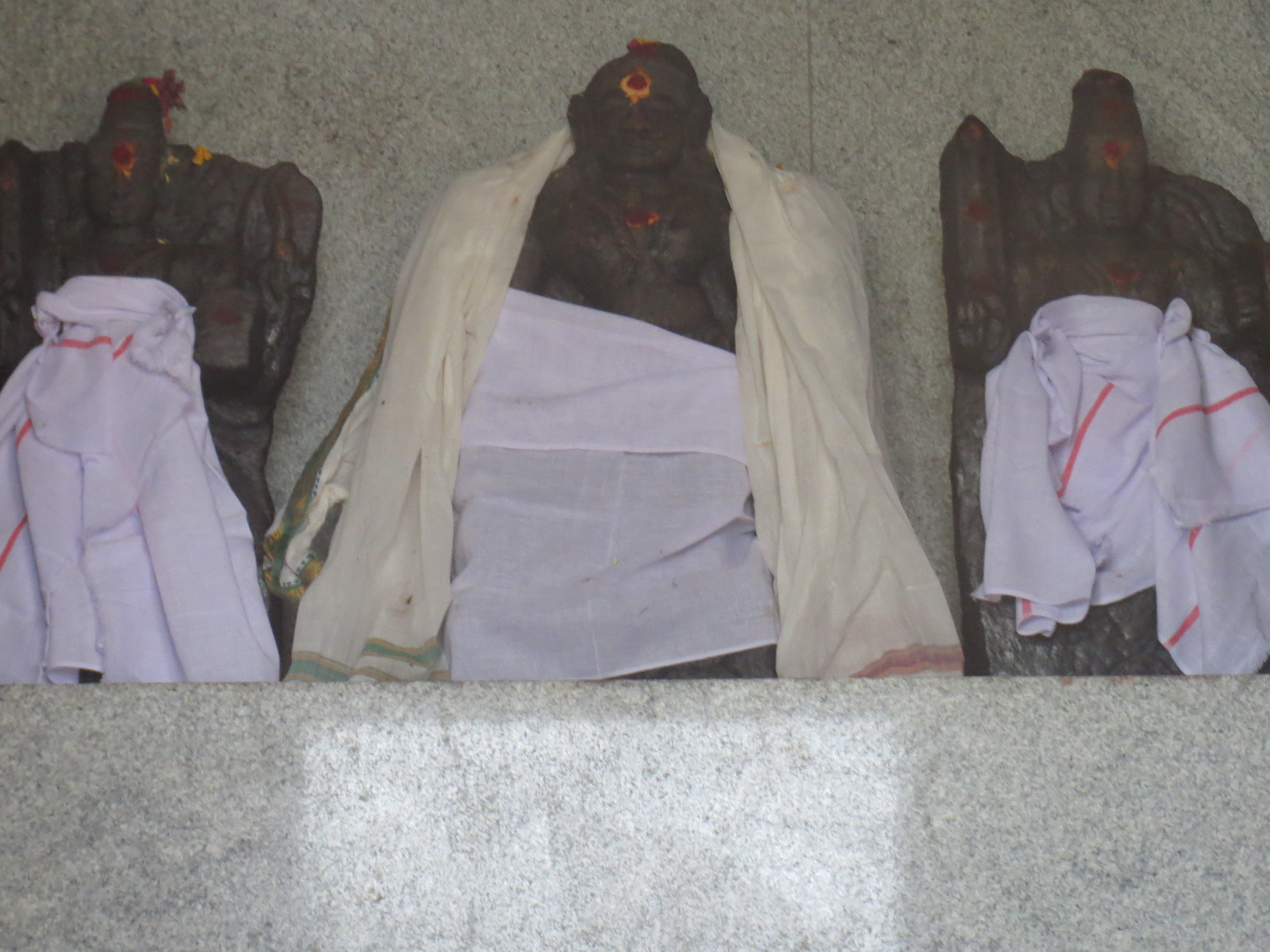
Three of the Navaveeragal with Virabahu in the centre

Virabahu (IAST: Vīrabāhu) is a Hindu deity. He is considered to be the commander-in-chief of Murugan's army. He is regarded in Tamil tradition to be one of the nine commanders (Navaveerargal) who were born to serve Murugan. Among the nine commanders, Virabahu is ranked the highest. He is worshipped mostly in Tamil Nadu.

== Legend ==
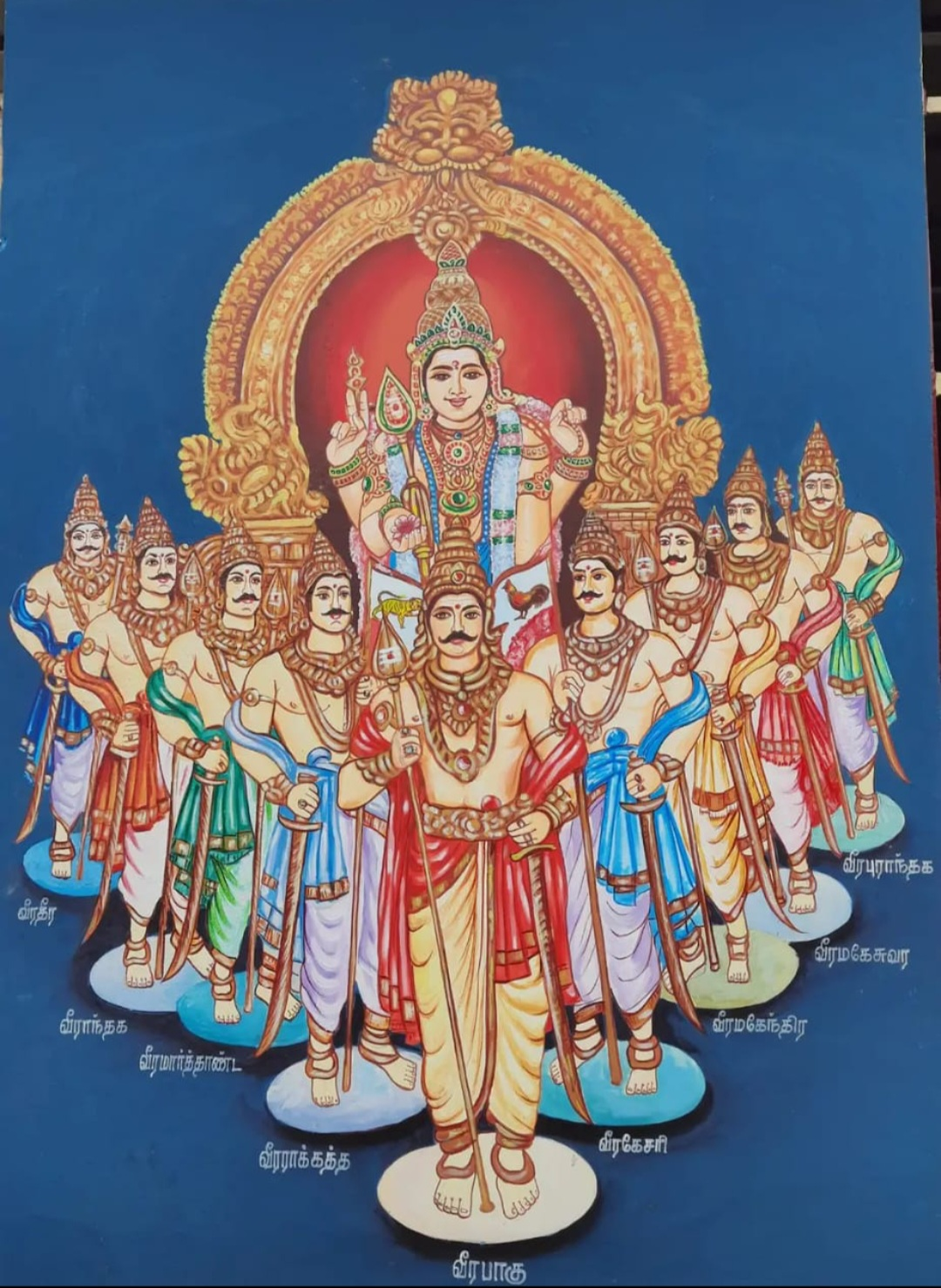
Veerabahu and 8 other Navaveerargal on the wall of Chidambaram temple

According to the Skanda Purana, after the birth of Murugan, Shakti took her silambu (anklet) nine shaktis were produced, and these were then transformed into the brothers of Murugan, called the Navaveeragal (lit. "nine warriors") in Tamil.

When Murugan was sent to destroy Surapadman, Virabahu and the other Navaveeragal followed him south, at the head of a huge army. At the Vindhyas, the army saw two of Surapadman's brothers - Krauncha, in the form of a mountain, and Tarakasura. Virabahu and his army attacked Tarakasura, but he laid a spell on them that made them go into Krauncha. After news was brought to Murugan of the defeat, he fought Tarakasura and pierced him with his heart. He then threw his Vel at Krauncha, who dissolved into dust. Afterwards, Virabahu and his army were restored to life.

Virabahu arrived at Surapadman's capital, Mahendrapuri, to ask for the release of the devas who were imprisoned by him after he conquered their world, so that war would not occur. He entered the palace and spoke to the devas imprisoned, saying that they were imprisoned for their sins and they would be saved by Murugan soon. Virabahu then arrived in Surapadman's throne room, but was insulted in being ignored and not offered a seat, as the laws of messengers demanded. However, Virabahu conjured a magnificent throne, and delivered his message for Surapadman to release the followers of Thirumal. Surapadman refused and attempted to imprison Virabahu as well. During his escape, he killed many asuras, including some of Surapadman's relatives, and informed Murugan of what had occurred.

Virabahu then fought in the war. One of Banukopan's weapons made him fall into a swoon along with much of the army, but after the astra was destroyed, he recovered. He accompanied Murugan on his return and during his weddings.

== In popular culture ==
The Sengunthar Kaikolar and senaithalaiavar communities, communities of weavers and warriors in Tamil Nadu, claim descent from Virabahu and other eight Navaveerargal.

== Gallery ==
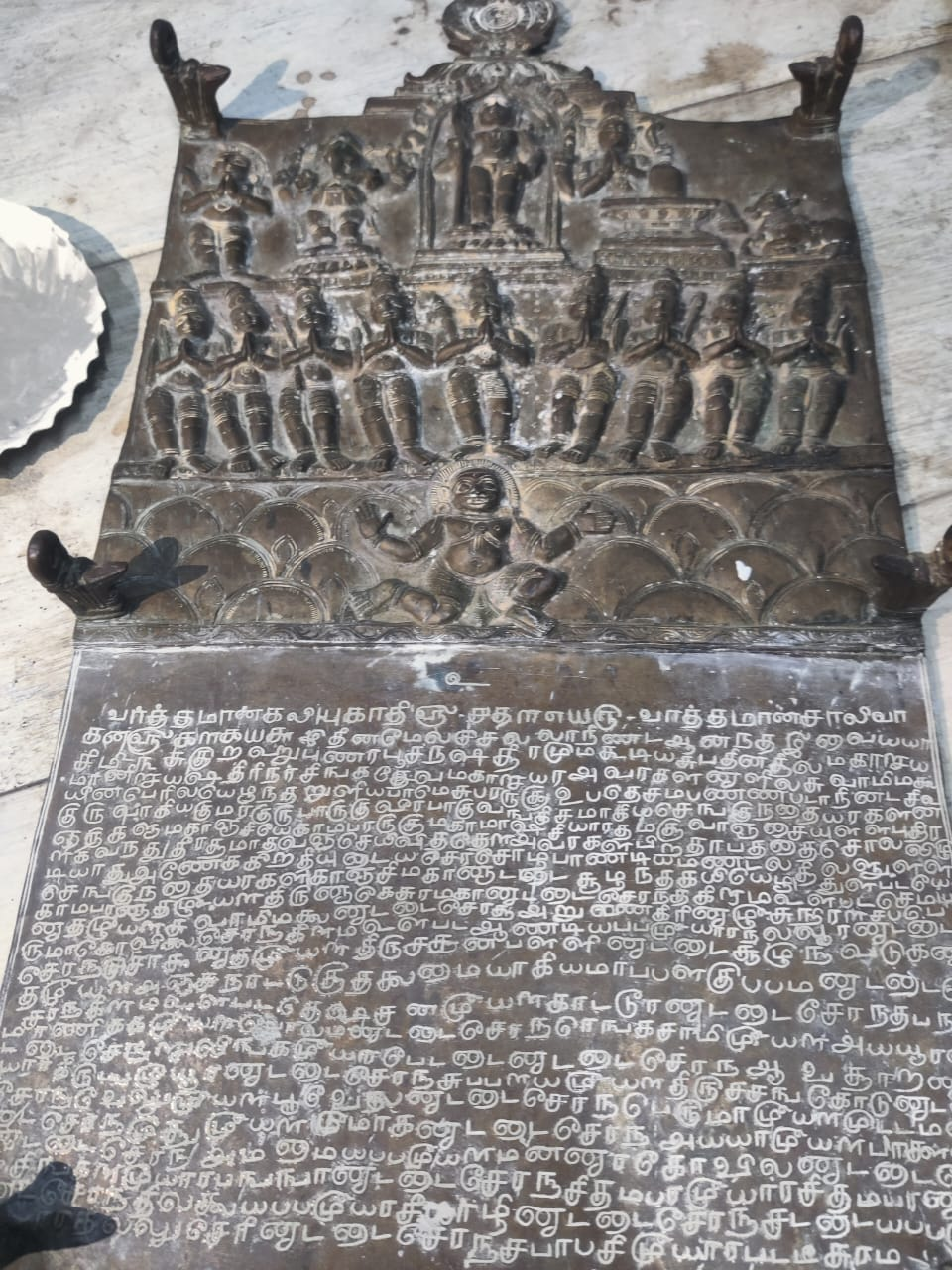
A 15th century copper plate inception of Swamimalai Senguntha Kaikolars, which has the cravings of Veerabahu Navaveerarkal, Lord Murugan, and Tamil scripts describe the Sengunthars rights at Swamimalai Murugan temple

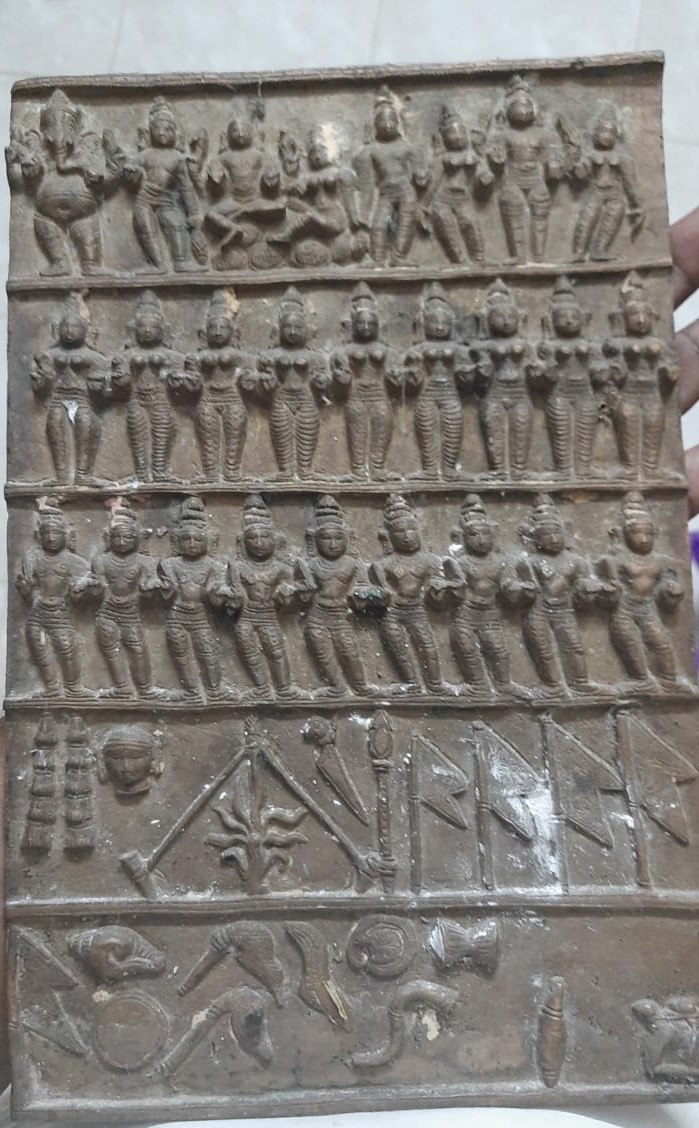
A copper plate increption made by Senguntha Kaikolars of 72 Nadus which has images of Shiva, Uma, Subramanya with Valli and Deivanai, Vinayka, the nine Sakthis, the nine heroes Virabahu and eight other Navavirars

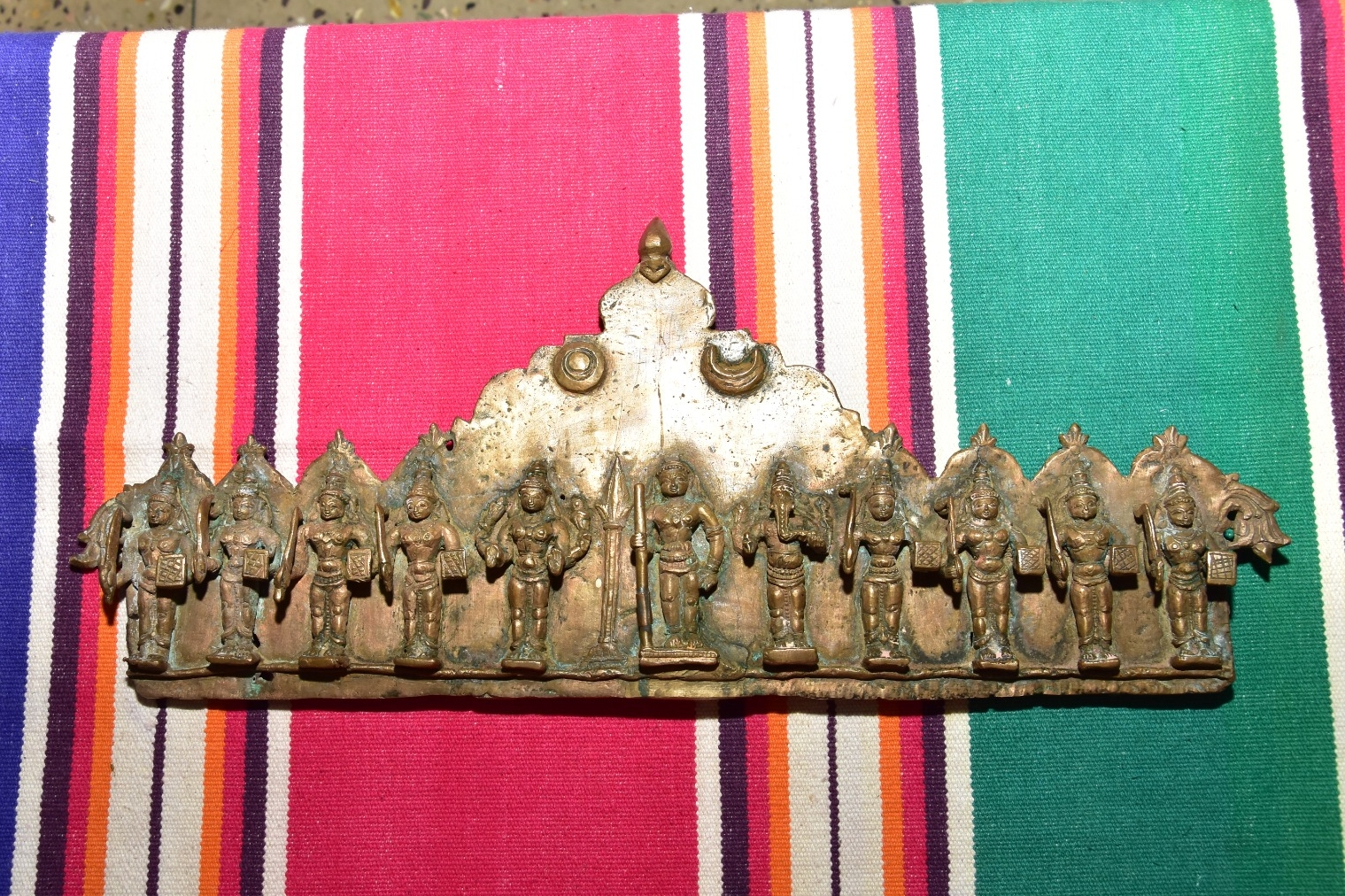
A copper plate of Senguntha Kaikolars of the year 1703 AD which says about their rights in Palani Soorasamharam. This plate has the cravings of Lord Murugan, Ganapathi, Veerabahu and eight other Navaveeras
