= Saliya =

Hindu weavers caste

Regions with significant populations
- Kerala; Karnataka; Tamil Nadu

Languages
- Malayalam; Kannada; Tamil; Telugu; Marathi

Religion
- Hinduism

Related ethnic groups
- Padmashali; Devanga; Pattariyar; Thogataveera

Saliya (also known as Saliyar, Chaliyan) is a South Indian Hindu caste. Their traditional occupation was that of weaving and they are found mostly in the regions of northern Kerala, southern coastal Karnataka, Andhra Pradesh, Tamil Nadu as well as Maharashtra and Madhya Pradesh.

== Etymology ==
In the Kannada and Telugu regions, early names for weaving groups were Saliga, Sale, Sali and similar forms. Another term was Jeda (and Jandra), which meant “spider”. Scholars note that Saliga is a tadbhava form of the Sanskrit jalikha, meaning spider or weaver, while Jeda is a native Kannada word.

In Kerala, the community is known as Chaliyan. Unlike several other west coast groups, they lived in organised weaving streets called teru. This settlement pattern has been taken by some researchers as evidence of earlier migration of weavers from Tamil regions into Kerala.

== History ==
According to Ramaswamy, as part of the Virasaiva movement weavers initially championed caste negation or anti-casteism initially. However, as time passed even that movement became caste-ridden and various communities started claiming ritual superiority vis-a-vis other communities part of the same religion and also against non-Virasaiva communities like Brahmins. As caste negation gave way to caste exaltation even weavers tried to obtain higher caste credentials and privileges. In 1231, at Chintamani (in the present day Karnataka region with a mixed Kannada/Telugu population) it is said (a dubious claim according to Vijaya Ramaswamy) that a king granted privileges like right to the yajnopavita (the sacred thread worn by Brahmins), right to ride a palanquin, right to one's own flag and symbol etc... to Devanga weavers. Many of these privileges were later granted to Padmashali weavers too.

Saliyars speak only Tamil in Tamil Nadu and do not know any other regional languages. Alli Nayanar is one of the 63 Nayans of the Saliyar community who are clearly mentioned in the great legends. Although the name Salyar is an ancient Tamil, the Salyar (TN) community lives mostly in southern Tamil Nadu, speaks only Tamil, and leans mostly towards Tamil culture.

== Edanga and Valanga divisions ==
The Right-hand (Valanga) and Left-hand (Edanga) division was an old social arrangement found mainly in the Tamil and Telugu regions of South India. Traditional accounts place the Saliya community on the Right-hand side, while groups such as the Devanga and Kaikkolar were usually associated with the Left-hand category.

== Relationship to other Malayali castes ==
In Kannur, Ashtamachal Bhagavathy temple part of Payyannur Teru has a unique tradition of a festival called Meenamrithu which is related to sea trading culture of the past. It was believed to have belonged to a merchant community called Valanjiyar belonging to left-hand caste group in the past. However, now Saliyas conduct this ritual. But relationship between Valanjiyar and Saliya communities at present is still a speculation.

== See also ==
- Nesa Nayanar
- Kaikolar
- Handloom
- Padmasali

== Additional references ==
- Caste and Race in India by G.S. Ghurye
- Report on Growth and Prospects of the Handloom industry.
