= S. K. Balakrishnan =

Indian politician

- Born: Somin K. Balakrishnan; 26 July 1935; Madurai, Tamil Nadu
- Died: 16 May 2002 (aged 67)
- Occupation: Mayor

S. K. Balakrishnan (SKB) (26 July 1935 – 16 May 2002 in Madurai), was Mayor of Madurai, Tamil Nadu, India between 1980 and 1982.

He was from Sourashtra community with family name "Somin". His father died when he was young and his mother, S.K.Nagalammal, brought him up. He grew up with the guidance of his elder brothers S. K. Subbaraman and S. K. Rajaram.

He belonged to ADMK Party and very close to then the Chief Minister of Tamil Nadu, M. G. Ramachandran (popularly known as MGR).
