= Saurashtra people =

Ethno-linguistic Hindu community of South India

Total population
- c. 2 million

Regions with significant populations
- Tamil Nadu, Kerala, Andhra Pradesh, Karnataka

Languages
- Saurashtra as mother tongue Sanskrit as liturgical language. Tamil, Kannada, Telugu or Malayalam as secondary language based on native state may be sometimes spoken outside home.

Religion
- Hinduism

Related ethnic groups
- Gujarati people, Pancha-Gauda Brahmins, Gauda Brahmins, Girnara Brahmin, Chitpavan Brahmins, Deshastha Brahmins, Saraswat Brahmins, Konkani people, Sanketi people, Tamil Brahmins and Telugu Brahmins

The Saurashtra people, or Saurashtrians, are an Indo-Aryan ethno-linguistic Hindu Brahmin community of South India who speak the Saurashtra language, an Indo-Aryan Gujarati language, and predominantly reside in the Indian states of Tamil Nadu, Kerala, Andhra Pradesh and Karnataka.

Saurashtrians trace their ancestry to the historical region of Saurashtra in Western India. Their migration to Southern India owes to the forays and desecration of the Somnath temple triggered by the frequent Muslim invasions, most notably by Mahmud Ghazni. They are known for their expertise in traditional vedic practices and rituals. Apart from being priests and scholars, they are also been involved in various professions such as agriculture, trade, and business and were a prominent industrious and prosperous mercantile community of merchants and weavers in southern India until the 20th century. They have contributed to the cultural and social fabric of Tamil Nadu in many ways and have continued to maintain their distinct identity over the centuries.

Saurashtrians are Brahmins, and are also referred to as Saurashtra Brahmins. Further, like all traditional orthodox Brahmins, they are classified based on their gotra, or patrilineal descent. The majority of the people are Vaishnavas, though there is a significant proportion of Shaivas as well. They are prominently known by their unique family names and also use the titles Sharma, Rao, Iyer, Iyengar and Achary as their surnames but belong to linguistic minorities.

== Names ==
Their name has many alternate spellings, including Sourashtra, Sowrashtra, Sowrastra and Sourashtri. Saurashtrians are colloquially called Palkar among themselves. They have also been known as Patnūlkarar, but the term is obsolete.

== Etymology ==
The word Saurashtra literally means "a good state". It is derived from Su meaning good, Rashtra meaning state and the other compound of Saura and Rashtra, meaning "the land of the Sun". These people were once sun worshipers and have built sun temples. The people worshiping Surya or Saura and inhabiting the land of the Sun are called Saurashtrians.

The Tamil name by which these people were also known in Tamil Nadu is Patnūlkarar, which means silk-thread people, mostly silk-thread merchants and silk weavers, since the early settlers set up silk-weaving guilds and were involved in the trade of silk clothes and diamonds to the royal families of Tamil country. After the Gupta dynasty, silk became the attire of royal families, the Saurashtrians were patronized by several dynasties across North India and the Chola, Pandya, Vijayanagara, Nayak and Thanjavur Maratha rulers patronized them in ancient South India. Their specialty was considered so honorable and complicated that they were in some cases exchanged as a major aspect of marriage settlements or as endowments to neighbouring kingdoms.

These people are first mentioned as Pattavayaka, the Sanskrit equivalent of Patnūlkarar in the Mandasor (present day Madhya Pradesh) inscriptions of Kumaragupta I belonging to the 5th century CE. They are also mentioned by the same name in the Patteeswaram inscriptions of Thanjavur belonging to the mid 16th century CE and in the inscriptions of Rani Mangammal of Madurai belonging to the 17th century CE.

== Identity ==
Saurashtrians are well assimilated in Tamil society, without any outward differentiation. Apart from certain religious adherences, brahminism and vegetarianism, their culture is similar to the rest of Tamil Nadu. Though their physical features are not similar to Tamils, they have Tamil names and are essentially a part of Tamil people, yet distinct in their ethnic identity and can be called Saurashtrian Tamils.

== Origin ==
The Bhagavata Purana mentions that the ancient Abhiras were the rulers of Saurashtra Kingdom and Avanti Kingdom and they were followers of the Vedas, who worshiped Vishnu as their supreme deity. These ancient provinces as depicted in the epic literature of Mahabharata roughly corresponds to the present day Saurashtra region of southern Gujarat and Malwa region of Madhya Pradesh.

Their origin is Dwarka, land of Lord Krishna, the origin of the name date backs to the time when the ancestors of these people inhabited the Lata region of Saurashtra in southern Gujarat. Saurashtrians are originally Gauda Brahmins and belong to Pancha-Gauda Brahmins. After their southward migration they have been called Saurashtra Brahmins. They had their original homes in present-day Gujarat and migrated to South India over a millennium ago. They are currently scattered over various places of Tamil Nadu and are mostly concentrated in Madurai, Thanjavur and Salem Districts.

== History ==
Saurashtrians migrated from southern Gujarat in 11th century CE after the fall of Somnath Temple when Mahmud of Ghazni invaded India. It is said that the Saurashtrians lived in Devagiri, the present day Daulatabad of Maharashtra during the regime of the Yadava kings up to 13th century CE. After the fall of Yadavas in 14th century CE they moved to Vijayanagar Empire, with its capital at Hampi in present-day Karnataka by the invitation of the Kings. The expansion of Vijayanagar empire brought the Saurashtrians into South India in 14th century CE, since they were highly skilled manufacturers of fine silk garments and were patronized by the Kings and their families. After the fall of Vijayanagar empire they were welcomed by the Nayak Kings of Thanjavur during mid 16th century CE and Madurai during 17th century CE and were allowed to settle near the Thirumalai Nayakkar Palace.

== Social division ==
=== Occupation, divisions, sects and gotras ===
From the view point of an outsider the community may be seen as a homogenous one. However, in reality many subdivisions exist among them at various levels. Occupationally, the Saurashtrians may be classified broadly as priests, merchants and weavers.

==== Divisions ====
When the Saurashtrians settled in the South, they reproduced the institutions of their mother country in the new land, but, owing to the influence of the Southern Dravidians, some of the institutions became extinct. During their migrations, the men were under the guidance of their leader and the process of migration tended to increase the power of kinship.

The people were divided into 5 heads –

- Goundans (Chiefs);
- Soulins (Elders);
- Voyduns (Physicians);
- Bhoutuls (Religious men);
- Karesthals (Commons).

Traces of this institution still survive. The Goundans were the judges in both civil and criminal affairs. They were aided in deciding cases by a body of nobles called Soulins. The office of the Soulins is to make enquiries, and try all cases connected with the community, and to abide by the decision of the chiefs. The Voyduns (vaidyas) and Bhoutuls (pandits, joshis and kavis) also ranked with Voyduns and had their honours on all important occasions, and they are placed in the same rank with the elders. The Karesthals (commons), are the whole body of masses. Their voice is necessary on certain important occasions, as during the ceremonies of excommunication, prayaschittas for admitting renegades, and during periodical meetings of the community.

==== Sects ====
The Saurashtrians may further be divided into three sects on a religious basis. viz.,

- Vaishnavites, who wear the vertical Vaishnavite mark, and call themselves northerners;
- Smarthas, who wear horizontal marks;
- Madhvas, who wear gopi (Sandal paste) as their sect mark.

All the above three divisions intermarry and interdine, and the religious difference does not create a distinction in the community. The Saurashtrians classify their ancestors as originally belonging to the two lines of Thiriyarisham and Pancharisham descent groups. They follow Apastamba Dharmasutra and belong to the Ahobila and Sankaracharya Mathas. Their religion is Hinduism, they follow Yajurveda, and they were originally Madhvas. After their settlement in Southern India, some of them, owing to the preachings of Sankaracharya and Ramanujacharya, were converted into Saivites and Vaishnavites respectively.

==== Gotras ====
Saurashtrians, like all other Hindu Brahmins, trace their paternal ancestors to one of the seven or eight sages, the saptarishis. They classify themselves into gotras, named after the ancestor rishi and each gotra consists of different family names. The gotra was inherited from Guru at the time of Upanayana, in ancient times, so it is a remnant of Guru-shishya tradition, but since the tradition is no longer followed, during Upanayana ceremony father acts as Guru of his son, so the son inherits his father's gotra. The entire community consists of 64 gotras.

Saurashtrians belong to following gotras.

- Agasthiya
- Angeerasa
- Aruni
- Asitha
- Athreya
- Bhageeratha
- Bharadwaja
- Bhargava
- Chyavana
- Dadheecha
- Devala
- Durvasa
- Galava
- Gargeya
- Gowthama
- Gowthsa
- Haritha
- Hothra
- Idhmavaaha
- Jabali
- Jaimuni
- Jamadagni
- Jannhu
- Kanva
- Kavasa
- Khasyaba
- Koumanda
- Koundinya
- Kousika
- Kupitha
- Maandavya
- Mandabala
- Mareesi
- Markandeya
- Mathanga
- Medhatithi
- Moudgalya
- Mounjanya
- Mythreya
- Ourva
- Pailava
- Parasara
- Pippala
- Pramathi
- Saaliga
- Sakthi
- Sandialya
- Sarabhanga
- Soomantha
- Soubari
- Shazhiya
- Sounaka
- Srivathsa
- Upamanyu
- Usena
- Uthanga
- Vaathsaayana
- Vaisampayana
- Valmiki
- Vamadeva
- Vasista
- Vathsa
- Viswamithra
- Vyasa

Marriage within common gotra is strictly prohibited.

==== Kuladevatas ====
Every Saurashtrian family has their own family patron deity or the Kuladevata. This deity is common to a lineage or a clan of several families who are connected to each other through a common ancestor. The practice of worshiping local or territorial deities as Kuladevata began in the period of the Yadava dynasty.

== Culture ==
=== Saṃskāras, rituals and Festivals ===
Saurashtrians have been traditionally an orthodox and closely knit community. They are essentially northern in their customs, manners and social structure. Traditionally, joint family was a social and economic unit for them. Moreover, the pattern of joint family helped them transmit their traditional culture to the younger generations.

==== Saṃskāras ====
Saurashtrians strictly adhere to all the Ṣoḍaśa Saṃskāra or 16 Hindu Samskaras, out of which, the main social customs among them consist of six social ceremonies in the life of a person. (1) the naming ceremony; (2) the sacred thread ceremony; (3) puberty; (4) marriage; (5) the attainment of the age of sixty; (6) the funeral rites.

The rites that are performed following the birth of a child are known as jathakarma. The naming ceremony in particular is known as namakaranam. The main aim of performing these birth ceremonies is to purify and to safeguard the child from diseases. These rituals are believed to check the ill effects of Planetary movement. The above rites were carried out on the eleventh day after birth of the child. Grandfather's name was much preferred for a male child and the name of a female deity was suggested for female child.

The vaduhom ceremony (sacred thread ceremony) of Saurashtrians is basically the upanayanam ceremony. This ceremony is exceedingly important among them. This is performed between seventh and thirteenth years. In rare cases when the sacred thread ceremony was not held in the young ages, it would be performed at the time of marriage. The goal of this ceremony was to highlight their Brahminical status. During this ceremony there was much feasting and entertainment which lasted for four days.

Among the Saurashtrians, attaining puberty was the greatest event in a girl's life. They also perform a pre-puberty marriage.

The wedding ceremony lasted 11 days with as many as 36 rituals. All these rituals were conducted by the Saurashtrian priests who were a separate clan in the community. The Saurashtrians have their own marital arrangements. Before a marriage is fixed, a long negotiation takes place between the parents of both partners. Being traditional orthodox Brahmins they are very much particular in matching the horoscope of the couple. A man may claim his maternal uncle's daughter as his wife, and polygamy is permitted. Girls get married at an early age. Marriage within common gotra is strictly prohibited among them.

Death rituals are termed as abarakkirigai or andhiyaeshti in the Saurashtrian community. Andhiyaeshti means the last or final fire. These rituals are carried out by the eldest son of the deceased. In case of no son, the relatives carry out the last rites. Kartha is the name given to the one who carries out this rite. The performance of the rite signifies the belief that the life is continuous and does not end by one's death. Further, the deceased are believed to reach the level of the deities. The period of mourning lasts for ten days, but it is repeated every year in the form of sraddha ceremonies.

==== Festivals ====
The Saurashtrians are of a religious bent of mind and they value morality and high character. The chief divinity of Saurashtrians is Venkateshwara of Tirupati. Among other Gods they worshipped Sun God, Rama etc. They made regular visits to Meenakshi temple. They celebrate Kolattam, Chithirai festival and Ramanavami with great enthusiasm, and observe Deepawali, Ganesh Chathurthi, Dussehra, Vaikunta Ekadasi and Avani Avittam as important religious days. Their present social customs differ markedly from the traditional pattern and bear a close resemblance to those of Tamils. Only some orthodox well-to-do merchant families stick to their older customs.

=== Attire ===
The way of living of the Saurashtrian men resembles to that of Iyengar Brahmins and the living of Saurashtrian women resembles to that of Telugu Brahmins.

Saurashtrian men wear dhoti or veshti with a shirt and scarf called khesa just like other Brahmin men. The men keep the hair-knot or sikha on the head with a vermilion mark or naamam on their forehead.

The Saurashtrian women wear saree in a different manner than the Tamil women. The unmarried ones wear in Bengali style, while the married ones wear in Marathi style. The shape and size of the ornaments worn by the Saurashtrian women are similar to that of Telugu Brahmin women. The ornaments are mostly made of precious diamonds and gold. The women also put vermilion mark on their foreheads just like the males but in smaller length and also decorate their head with flowers called veni.

=== Cuisine ===
The Saurashtrian cuisine is famous for its mixed rice dishes that includes puliyotharai (tamarind rice), tomato rice with a hint of cinnamon, kalkandu (sugar candy) rice, sakkarai pongal (a dessert made of cotton seed milk) and lemon rice. Apart from these dishes Saurashtrians have special liking towards halva and poli. Other South Indian delicacies such as dosas, idli, sambar and rasam etc. are also favored by the Saurashtrians. Rasam believed to have originated in the 16th century in Madurai by Saurashtrians. They prefer calling it ‘Pulichaar’ which means tart or tamarind. Several historians believe that it was Saurashtrian textile merchants who introduced idly to South India during the 10th and 12th centuries. There are even claims that a mix of rice and urad dal ground together and later steamed to form cakes had its origins in Gujarat. This was called Iddada. Another dish that the Saurashtrian traders brought to Madurai in the 16th century is a vada made from deep-fried spinach, it became the keerai vadai and remains a specialty of Madurai.

==== Diet ====
Traditionally, Saurashtrians are vegetarian and those who are involved in priesthood activities adhere to strict vegetarianism. Rice is their staple food along with sambar, gojju & amti (rasam). However, nowadays, some occasionally take non-vegetarian food.

== Demographics ==
There are three group of Saurashtrians living in Tamil Nadu. First migrants came to Salem and settled there, second group of migrants settled in Thanjavur and its surrounding places and later third group of migrants settled in Madurai and its surrounding places. Saurashtrians maintain a predominant presence in Madurai, a city, also known as 'Temple City' in the southern part of Tamil Nadu. Though official figures are hard to come by, it is believed that the Saurashtrian population is anywhere between one-fourth and one-fifth of the city's total population.

They are present in significant numbers in Ambur, Ammapettai, Ammayappan, Aranthangi, Arni, Ayyampettai, Bhuvanagiri, Chennai, Dharasuram, Dindigul, Erode, Kancheepuram, Kanyakumari, Karaikudi, Kottar, Krishnapuram, Kumbakonam, Namakkal, Nilakottai, Palani, Palayamkottai, Paramakudi, Parambur, Periyakulam, Puducherry, Pudukkottai, Rajapalayam, Ramanathapuram, Rasipuram, Salem, Thanjavur, Thirubhuvanam, Thiruvaiyaru, Thiruvarur, Thuvarankurichi, Tirunelveli, Tiruvannamalai, Illuppur, Thiruvappur, Trichy, Vaniyambadi, Veeravanallur, Vellanguli, Pudukkudi, Kilakukulam, Krishnapuram, Vellore, Walajahpettai in Tamil Nadu.

They are also present in Trivandrum and Kochi in Kerala, Bengaluru in Karnataka, Hyderabad in Telangana and Tirupati, Vizianagaram, Vijayawada, Nellore, Srikakulam, Vishakapatnam in Andhra Pradesh are said to house several Saurashtrian families, known as Pattusali.

== Language ==
The mother tongue of Saurashtrians is Saurashtra (alternate names and spellings: Sourashtra, Sowrashtra, Sourashtri, Palkar), an amalgamation of present-day Sanskrit, Hindi, Marathi, Konkani, Kannada, Telugu & Tamil. Most Saurashtra speakers are bilingual and can speak either Tamil or Telugu or one of the local languages.

Saurashtra, an offshoot of Sauraseni Prakrit, once spoken in the Saurashtra region of Gujarat, is spoken today chiefly by the population of Saurashtrians settled in parts of Tamil Nadu. With the Saurashtrian language being the only Indo-Aryan language employing a Dravidian script and is heavily influenced by the Dravidian languages such as Tamil, Telugu and Kannada. However, Census of India places the language under Gujarati.

== Organisation ==
The prominent leaders among the community arose in the late 19th century and felt the need of organizing the community. At first, the Madurai Saurashtra Sabha was formed in the year 1895 and it was formally registered in the year 1900 with many objectives. The formation of this Sabha was the first step towards social mobilization. The Sabha's administration is carried out by elected Councillors and office bearers. It has its own rules and regulations regarding holding of elections, rights and duties of office bearers and celebration of social functions. The election to the Sabha is held once in three years. The social life of the Saurashtrians is controlled almost wholly by the Saurashtra Sabha. This organisation is a committee of the leading men of the community, which manages and controls all the schools and public institutions, the temple and its worship, and all political, religious, and social questions among the Saurashtrians.

The Saurashtra Madhya (central) Sabha, which has its headquarters at Madurai now remains as the cultural center for all the Saurashtrians living in Tamil Nadu. Many well-to-do merchants and philanthropists of the community have contributed substantially to the growth of these institutions. Today, the Saurashtrians are represented in white collar jobs and professions in large numbers.

In 2009, Narendra Modi, the then Chief Minister of Gujarat and the current and 14th Prime Minister of India, inaugurated the Research Institute of Saurashtra Heritage and Immigration (RISHI), a project in association with Saurashtra University, Rajkot.

== Politics ==
In the second decade of 20th century, the Saurashtrians emerged as a dominant group in social and political life of Madras Presidency. The Saurashtrians emerged as the dominant social group because of their collective mobilization, intellectual leadership, education, wealth, trade and enterprise. There are several instances when the leaders of the community organised the weavers and made social and economic protests. The well-to-do merchants of the community made donations to TNCC for Salt Satyagraha and welcomed any form of Swadeshi agitation which favoured Indian cloth.

The leaders who came to lead the community were not always from the upper class. L. K. Thulasiram, who led the community in Madurai, was not born into the aristocratic family. With his own efforts he travelled abroad which brought prosperity to himself and to the community in general. Thulasiram at first supported the non-Brahmin movement in Tamil Nadu. When he earned the displeasure of his community members who were fighting for Brahminical status, he changed his mind and supported the cause of his own people. He got elected as Municipal Chairman in 1921 amidst a fierce contest. During his tenure he brought many reforms within the community. He introduced free mid-day meal scheme in community owned school for the first time in the country which was later emulated by the Government of Tamil Nadu during the period of K. Kamaraj in the name of noon-meal scheme in Government schools. When he lost his hold in Municipal Council, he became a prominent organizer of non-cooperation movement. Later he impressed the Congress Party and became the leader of the merchants. In this capacity he strove hard to raise the prestige and position of his community.

N.M.R. Subbaraman, another leader of the community, financed and led the Civil Disobedience Movement In Madurai from 1930 to 1932. He worked for the advancement of the depressed classes. He, along with A. Vaidyanatha Iyer, organised a temple entry conference and helped the people of the depressed classes to enter Meenakshi Amman Temple. He was involved in the Bhoodan movement and donated his 100 acres of land to the movement. He contributed to establishing the first Gandhi Memorial Museum in Madurai. Later he expressed his dissatisfaction with Civil Disobedience. He felt unhappy about the expenditure incurred on the agitational activities. He mobilized his followers into Municipal politics with the help of Venkatamarama Iyer faction under the Congress banner.

S.R. Radha, former Minister and one of the founding members of the AIADMK, who also led the community in Kumbakonam, Thanjavur. He was attracted to Periyar E. V. Ramasamy's rationalist ideas and was drawn to the Dravidian movement and later joined the DMK and subsequently, the AIADMK. He was one among those who signed the party document when AIADMK was launched in 1972 by M.G. Ramachandran after his expulsion from the DMK. Mr. Radha was first elected to the state assembly constituency of Kumbakonam, later, in 1983, he became a member of the Legislative Council. When M.G. Ramachandran was Chief Minister of Tamil Nadu. Subsequently, In March 1985, he was appointed as Deputy General Secretary of the AIADMK. After the death of the AIADMK founder, Mr. Radha supported J. Jayalalithaa’s leadership of the party. In recognition, she appointed him Leader of the Opposition. But the rise of Jayalalithaa's associate V.K. Sasikala and members of her family in the AIADMK made Radha's continuation in the party untenable and was later expelled from the AIADMK.

== Portrayal in popular media ==
- In a 1967 Tamil mystery thriller movie Athey Kangal, Bhaskar, (portrayed by Ravichandran), the hero and his friend (portrayed by Nagesh) are found speaking Saurashtra in a famous song Pombala Oruthi Irundhalam.
- In a 2014 Tamil movie Naan Than Bala, Vaishali (portrayed by Shwetha Bandekar), one of the main characters, her father speaks Saurashtra, thereby suggesting that she is from a Saurashtrian family.
- In another 2014 Tamil comedy-gangster movie Jigarthanda, Kayalvizhi (portrayed by Lakshmi Menon), the heroine and her mother (portrayed by Ambika) are found speaking in Saurashtra, thereby suggesting that they are Saurashtrians.
- In a 2019 Tamil-language drama film Kanne Kalaimaane, Bharathi (portrayed by Tamanna Bhatia), the heroine speaks to her brother in Saurashtra, thereby suggesting that she is a Saurashtrian.

== Notable people ==
=== Religion ===
- Venkataramana Bhagavathar (1781–1874), a direct disciple of Saint Thyagaraja

=== Cinema ===
- T. M. Soundararajan (1924–2013), Tamil Playback singer
- P. V. Narasimha Bharathi (1924–1978), Tamil film Actor
- Kaka RadhaKrishnan (1925–2012), Veteran actor
- S. C. Krishnan (1929–1983), Tamil Playback singer
- M. S. Sundari Bai (1923–2006), Tamil film Actress
- Sumathi, Tamil film Actress
- Prabhakar, Tamil film Actor
- T. K. Ramachandran, Tamil film Actor
- M. N. Rajam, Tamil film Actress
- A. L. Raghavan, Tamil Playback singer
- Vennira Aadai Nirmala, Tamil film Actress
- Seetha, Tamil film Actress
- Jagadeesh Kanna, Tamil film Actor

=== Literature ===
- Sankhu Ram (1907–1976), Saurashtrian poet (translated the Tirukkural into Saurashtra)
- M. V. Venkatram (1920–2000), Tamil writer (Sahitya Akademi Award granted for his Kathukal Novel)

=== Politics ===
- N. M. R. Subbaraman (1905–1983), Tamil politician & Freedom fighter
- S. R. Eradha (1934-2021), Tamil politician, Former Minister & Opposition Party Leader (AIADMK)
- S. K. Balakrishnan, Tamil politician & Former Mayor
- A. G. Subburaman, Tamil politician & Former MP
- A. G. S. Ram Babu, Tamil politician & Former MP

=== Academics ===
- T. S. Chandrasekar, Awarded Padma Shri by the Govt of India. Founder, MedIndia, Chennai
- K. Amarnath Ramakrishna, Superintending Archaeologist involved in Keezhadi Excavations

== Educational institutions ==
- Sourashtra College, Madurai

== Temples ==
- Sri Kothanda Ramaswamy Temple

== See also ==
- Pattegar
- Pathare Prabhu
- Daivadnya Brahmin
- Chandraseniya Kayastha Prabhu
- Gaud Saraswat Brahmin
- Thanjavur Marathi people
- Vadama Iyers
- Pattusali
