= Padmasali (caste) =

Hindu weavers caste found in various Indian states

Regions with significant populations
- Andhra Pradesh, Telangana, Karnataka, Maharashtra, Gujarat, Tamil Nadu

Languages
- Telugu, Kannada, Tamil, Marathi, Gujarati, Tulu

Religion
- Hinduism

Related ethnic groups
- Devanga, Pattusali, Pattariyar, Saliya

Padmasali (also spelt as Padmashali, Padmasale) is a Hindu caste residing in the Indian states of Andhra Pradesh, Telangana, Karnataka, Maharashtra, Gujarat and Tamil Nadu. In coastal Karnataka they are called Shettigar. Their traditional occupation is weaving.

== Etymology ==
The term Padmasali is derived from two words Padma and Sali; Padma means lotus and Sali means weaver. The word Padma refers to the myth of the thread that was a lotus which sprang from the navel of Vishnu.

== History ==
The Padmasalis are part of the wider community of Telugu weavers, who are known as "Sale" or "Saliya". Historically, they were also referred to by other castes as "Julai".

The Padmasalis follow their historical origins and Puranas such as Kulapurana and Markandeya Purana.

The Padmasalis and the Devangas, who are another caste of weavers, were originally a single caste in ancient times and followed Vaishnavism. The caste then split due to differences in faith, with the Devangas being influenced by Lingayatism and accepting Chamundeswari, the fierce form of Durga as their kuladevi. The Padmasalis maintained their belief in Vaishnavism. The Padmasalis eventually specialised in weaving clothes of all varieties.

The Padmasalis are of Shudra origin, but through the process of Sanskritisation they claim to be of Brahmin status. They created various myths in order to reconcile their low-status in the Hindu caste-system with their claims to high-caste Sanskritic Brahmin status. In one myth, for example, the sage Markandeya performed a sacrifice and out of the sacrifice came Bhavanarishi, who married two daughters of the sun god Surya and had 101 sons. The Padmasalis claim to be the descendants of these 101 sons and claim that they followed Brahmin rites and customs until Kali Yuga, the last of the four ages in Hindu chronology. According to the myth, one member of the caste refused to reveal the secrets of the caste gem, the Padmaksha, to the god Ganapati. Angered, Ganapati cursed them to be of low status.

The 101 children correspond to the 101 gotras of the Padmasalis. These gotras are used to regulate marriages, however Husan noted in 1920 that the many illiterate Padmasalis were unaware that their caste had gotras. Only a few Padmasalis have the Brahmin gotras. The guru of the Padmasalis, Tata Acharya, and his deputy, Pattabhai Ramaswamy, traveled throughout regions where the Padmasalis lived and tried to raise their social and religious status. They along with the Padmasali Mahasabha advised the Padmasalis to become vegetarians, to not drink liquor, to prohibit the re-marriage of widows, to prohibit child-marriage, to wear the sacred thread, and perform Brahmanical rites. This was done as the previous religious customs of the Padmasalis were seen as being indicative of their low status in the Hindu caste system, and so sought to erase them in order to obtain greater socio-religious status.

Members of the Padmasali community migrated into Tamil-speaking regions from Andhra Pradesh. Their descendants continue to speak Telugu at home. After migration, the Padmasalis lived in Saliya Teru (weavers' street) specially assigned to them by royal patrons in the temple town of Kanchipuram. Major silk retail houses like Nalli are owned by Padmasali families.

== Present ==
The Padmasalis are further divided into two groups based on Sampradaya, being the Shaivas and the Vaishnavas. While the Shaivas give preference to worshipping Shiva, the Vaishnavas give preference to worship of Vishnu. These religious and occupational distinctions are no bar to interdining and intermarriage. They worship local goddesses such as Chamundeswari and Yellamma. The latter is traditionally considered to be the mother of Parasurama and is identified with Renuka. The Padmasalis wear the sacred thread. However, this practice has declined in recent years, along with desires of Sanskritisation and high caste status.

== Notable people ==
- Pragada Kotaiah
- Konda Laxman Bapuji
- Nalli Kuppuswami Chetti
- Ale Narendra
- Panchumarthi Anuradha

== See also ==
- Puttapaka Saree
- Kaikala
- Pattusali
- Telugu castes
