= Pattariyar =

The Pattariyar are a traditional silk handloom weaving community from South India, primarily of Tamil origin. Their name likely derives from "Pattusaliyar."

== Origin ==
Oral traditions suggest the Pattariyar originated in Kanchipuram, Tamil Nadu, migrating due to a conflict with a local king. Some accounts propose North Indian roots before they settled in South India as silk weavers. Settlements Tamil Nadu: Present in Kalakad, Veeravanellur, Pattamadal, and Eranail. Kerala: Found in Alappuzha, Kottayam, Ernakulam, and Thrissur, with institutions like Pattariya Samajam High School and Kadavil Sree Mahalakshmi Temple. Other regions include Kochi and Thrippunithura. Culture and Traditions In Travancore, Pattariyars maintain distinct living spaces from the Saliyan community and identify as Vaishyas. They claim ancestral ties to the southern banks of the Ganges River. Historical Connections The Pattariyar Setti subgroup may have branched from the Kaikolan community. Unlike Telugu Patusaalis, who retain their native language, Pattariyars are distinct. Historical persecution by a leader named SaivaNaik reportedly drove many to Madurai and Tanjore.

- Pattusali
- Adaviyar
