= Saurashtra language =

Indo-Aryan language spoken in India

Saurashtra
- ꢱꣃꢬꢵꢰ꣄ꢜ꣄ꢬ ꢩꢵꢰꢵ சௌராட்டிர மொழி సౌరాష్ట్ర భాష सौराष्ट्र भाषा ಸೌರಾಷ್ಟ್ರ ಭಾಷೆ
- Word "Saurashtra" in Saurashtra Script
- Native to: India
- Region: Tamil Nadu, Andhra Pradesh, Karnataka
- Ethnicity: Saurashtrians
- Native speakers: 247,702 (2011 census)
- Language family: Indo-European: Indo-Iranian; Indo-Aryan; Western Indo-Aryan; Gujarati; Saurashtra
- Early form: Sauraseni Prakrit
- Dialects: Northern Saurashtra; Southern Saurashtra
- Writing system: Saurashtra script (Brahmic); Tamil script Telugu script Devanagari script Latin script

Language codes
- ISO 639-3: saz
- Glottolog: saur1248

Saurashtra (Saurashtra script: ꢱꣃꢬꢵꢰ꣄ꢜ꣄ꢬ ꢩꢵꢰꢵ, Tamil script: சௌராட்டிர மொழி, Devanagari script: सौराष्ट्र भाषा) is an Indo-Aryan language spoken primarily by the Saurashtrians of Southern India who migrated from the Lata region of present-day Gujarat to south of Vindhyas in the Middle Ages.

Saurashtra, an offshoot of Shauraseni Prakrit, once spoken in the Saurashtra region of Gujarat, is now chiefly spoken in various places of Tamil Nadu and are mostly concentrated in Madurai, Thanjavur and Salem Districts.

The language has its own script of the same name, but is also written in the Tamil, Telugu, and Devanagari scripts. The Saurashtra script is of Brahmic origin, although its exact derivation is not known. Unlike most of the surrounding Dravidian languages, Saurashtra is Indo-European. There is some debate amongst speakers of the Saurashtra language as to which script is best suited to the language. Census of India places the language under Gujarati. Official figures show the number of speakers as 247,702 (2011 census).

== Classification ==
Saurashtra belongs to the western branch of the Indo-Aryan languages, a dominant language family of the Indian subcontinent. It is part of the greater Indo-European language family. It is also classified as being part of a Gujaratic languages that, alongside Saurashtra includes the languages like Gujarati (see SIL Ethnologue).

== Etymology ==
According to the oral legends of the Saurashtra people, they migrated to South India from the Saurashtra region of modern-day Gujarat; however, scholars believe this account lacks historical basis, and that the Saurashtrans actually migrated from the area of Mandsaur.

The name "Saurashtra" itself is from Sanskrit सौराष्ट्र (saurāṣṭra, transl. from Saurashtra), the vṛddhi form of सुराष्ट्र (surāṣṭra, transl. Saurashtra), derived from सु (su, transl. good) + राष्ट्र (rāṣṭra, transl. country, realm). Thus the name literally means "(of/from) a good country."

== History ==
The oldest available inscriptions in Saurashtra are found in Mandasaur, which is a city in the Malwa region (present day Madhya Pradesh). The language is the modern living and active form of ancient Shauraseni Prakrit. However, it also shows some similarities with Maharashtri Prakrit, the ancestor of Marathi and Konkani.

Saurashtra was once commonly spoken in the coastal areas of Mahi and Tapti rivers, which extends throughout the Malwa region of Madhya Pradesh and Saurashtra region of southern Gujarat. It was also spoken by the people living along Konkan region, which extends throughout the western coasts of Maharashtra, Goa and Karnataka.

Saurashtra is an amalgamation of various present day Indo-Aryan languages like Marathi, Konkani, Gujarati and the older dialects of Rajasthani and Sindhi. However, the current spoken form of Saurashtra is mixed with the Dravidian languages like Kannada, Telugu and Tamil and it might have originated in 16th or early 17th century.

== Geographical distribution ==
Speakers of the Saurashtra language, known as Saurashtrians, maintain a predominant presence in Madurai, Thanjavur, Salem, Dindigul, Tiruchirappalli, Tirunelveli, Kanchipuram, Ramanathapuram, Kanyakumari, Chennai, Tiruvannamalai and Vellore Districts of Tamil Nadu. They are also present in significant numbers in Tirupati of Andhra Pradesh and Karnataka.

== Dialects ==
In the course of migration, Saurashtrians moved in groups and settled in different regions of South India and that caused a slight dialect variation between each group and is noticeable by a Saurashtrian speaker when interacting with another group. Saurashtra language has two dialects, which are broadly similar, with slight variations.

The two dialects are:

1. Northern Saurashtra
2. Southern Saurashtra

However, there are numerous variations and dialects of the Saurashtra language. The different dialects can be based on the location within northern and southern parts of Tamil Nadu. Those are Madurai, Thanjavur, Salem, Tirunelveli and Kanchipuram dialects and Tirupati dialect of Andhra Pradesh.

== Phonology ==
The phoneme inventory of Saurashtra is similar to that of many other Indo-Aryan languages, especially that of the Konkani language. An IPA chart of all contrastive sounds in Saurashtra is provided below.

		Labial	Dental	Alveolar	Retroflex	(Alveolo-) palatal	Velar	Glottal
Nasal	plain	m	n̪		ɳ			
Nasal	murmured	mʱ	n̪ʱ					
Stop/ Affricate	voiceless	p	t̪	t͡s	ʈ	t͡ʃ	k	
Stop/ Affricate	aspirated	pʰ	t̪ʰ	(tsʰ)	ʈʰ	t͡ʃʰ	kʰ	
Stop/ Affricate	voiced	b	d̪	d͡z	ɖ	d͡ʒ	ɡ	
Stop/ Affricate	murmured	bʱ	d̪ʱ	d͡zʱ	ɖʱ	d͡ʒʱ	ɡʱ	
Fricative				s		ʃ		h
Approximant	plain	ʋ		l	ɭ	j		
Approximant	murmured	ʋʱ		lʱ				
Flap/Trill	plain			r				
Flap/Trill	murmured			rʱ				

Vowels
	Front	Central	Back
High	i		u
Mid	e	ə	o
Low		a	

== Writing system ==
=== Saurashtra script ===
The word "Saurashtra" written in the Saurashtra script.

Saurashtra for most of the part had been an oral language lacking any script of its own. Around the 17th to 18th centuries some attempted to write it in Telugu script. Around 19th century a script was invented. There were attempts to revitalize the script in the latter half of the 19th century, ignoring most of the complex conjunct characters.

The Saurashtra script is an abugida, that is, each letter represents a consonant+vowel syllable. There are thirty-four such letters. An unmarked letter represents a syllable with the inherent vowel [a]; letters can be marked with one of eleven vowel diacritics to represent a syllable with a different vowel. Vowel diacritics are attached to the top right corner of a base letter or written alongside it. There are also twelve letters for writing independent vowels (i.e. word-initial vowels). The four vocalic liquid letters r, ru, l and lu behave in the same way as vowels, so are often included in the vowel class.

Early Saurashtra texts use a number of complex conjunct forms for writing consonant clusters. However, when the script was restructured in the 1880s these were abandoned in favour of a virama diacritic, which silences the inherent vowel of the first consonant in a cluster.

The script uses a letter called upakshara, a dependent consonant sign which attaches nasals and liquids to aspirate them. That is, the letter m with upakshara attached represents [mha]. An aspirated nasal or liquid which is followed by a vowel other than [a] is written with the vowel diacritic attached to the upakshara, not to the base letter. Some analyses of the script classify aspirated nasal and liquids as a separate set of single discrete letters divided into two parts.

There is a script-specific set of numbers 0–9, some of which closely resemble Devanagari digits. The widely attested Indic punctuation marks danda and double danda are used to mark the end of a sentence or clause. Latin comma, full stop and question mark symbols are also used.

The letter order of Saurashtra script is similar to other Brahmic scripts. The letters are vowels, consonants, and the compound letters which are formed essentially by adding a vowel sound to a consonant.

=== Devanagari script ===
Recently, the Saurashtrian community has largely switched to the use of the Devanagari script. The alphabet chart containing vowels, consonants and the compound letters in Devanagari script are as follows:

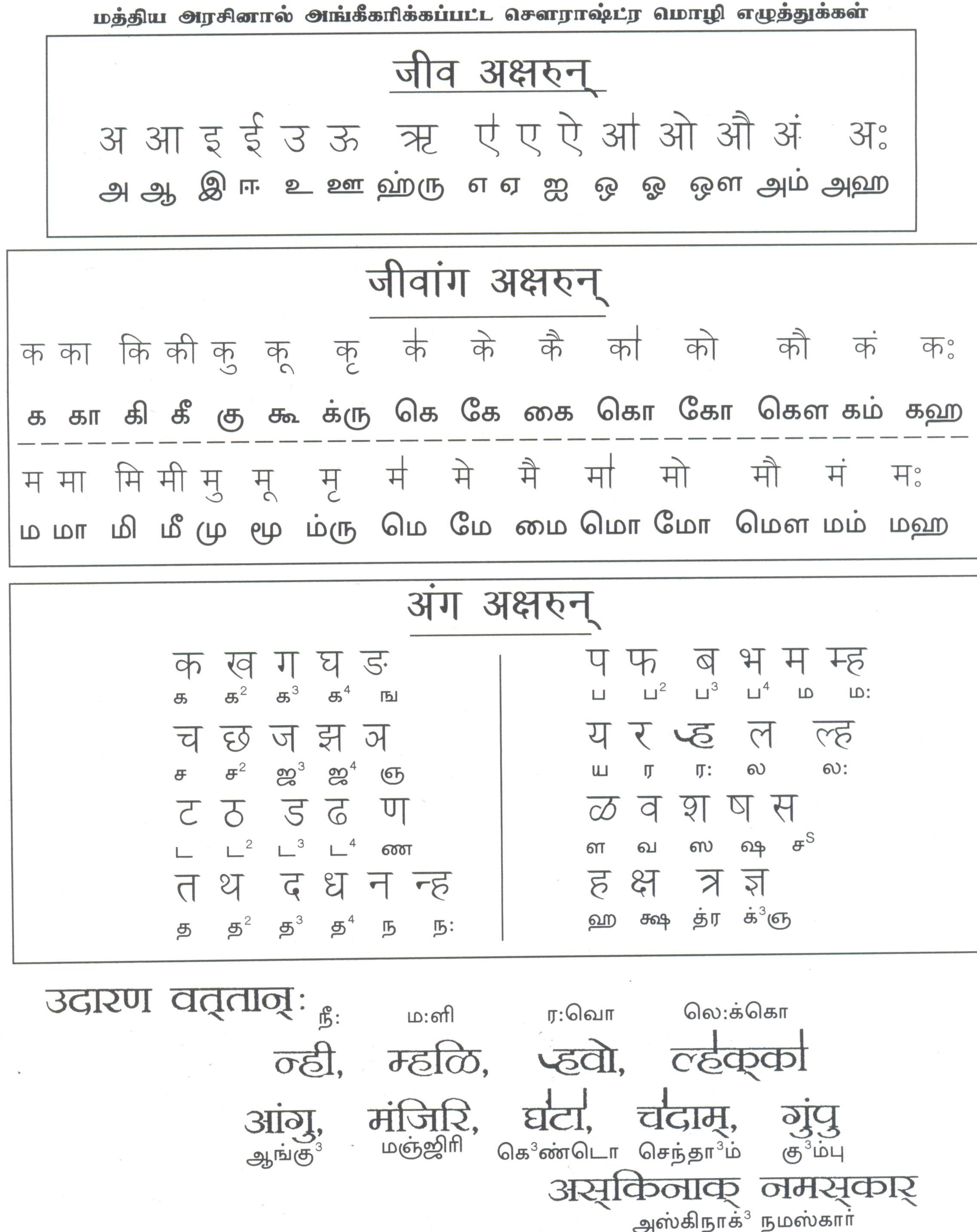
Saurashtra Devanagari alphabet chart released with guidance of CIIL

== Loanwords ==
The language itself is more similar to modern day Gujarati and Marathi as both originated from Prakrit. However, in the course of migration to South India, the language was influenced by Dravidian Languages such as Telugu and Kannada and accumulated words from those language in its vocabulary as loanwords.

English	Saurashtra loanword	Donor-language word
Rasam	Pilcār	Cāru (Telugu)
Read	Caudata	Caduvu (Telugu)
Mirror	Addam	Addam (Telugu)
Flattened rice	Aḍkul	Aṭukulu (Telugu)
Shop	Aṅgiḍi	Aṅgaḍi (Kannada)
Rangoli	Muggu	Muggulu (Telugu)
Cloth	Boṭṭa	Baṭṭe (Telugu)
Jump	Dhuṅki	Dumuku (Kannada/ Telugu)
Vehicle	Boṇḍi	Baṇḍi (Telugu)
Children	Pillalu	Pillalu (Telugu)
Punch	Gudti	Guddu (Kannada/ Telugu)
Sprinkles	Ciṅkul	Chinukulu (Telugu)
Drop	Boṭṭu	Bottu (Kannada /Telugu)
Monkey	Kōti	Kōti (Telugu/ Kannada)
Fog/Snow	Moñcu	Mañcu (Tamil), (Telugu)

== Literature ==
The literature of Saurashtra is not as large as the literature of other literary languages such as Tamil, Sanskrit, Kannada, and Telugu. The earliest available Saurashtra literature that survives to this date is the Saurashtra translation of the great Sanskrit epic of Ramayana. It was written by Venkatasoori Swamigal (1800 AD), a Sanskrit scholar and disciple of Venkataramana Bhagavathar who lived in Ayyampettai of Thanjavur district.

Other important literary works in Saurashtra are:

- Bhagavad Gita (Bhagavat Giito) 1953 AD – written by T.R.Padman abhaiyer
- Thirukkural (Saurashtra Thirukural Payiram—Pitika Pragaranam) 1980 AD – translated by Sankhu Ram
- Mahabharata (Paandavun Khetho) 2013 AD – written by Kasin Anantham
- Silappatikaram 2018 AD – translated by S.D.Gnaneswaran

Besides Thirukkural, Sankhu Ram has done many literary works in Saurashtra like Gnanamritha Geetham, Shiddhashrama Prabhaavam and so on. The first Saurashtra dictionary was brought out by T.M. Rama Rai, the author of Vachana Ramayana, in 1908. It was printed in Saurashtra script and was in the form of slokas. Apart from these he is also credited for Niti Sambu and Natanagopala Nayaki Swami's Kirthanas.

The Sahitya Akademi Award is given to authors writing in the Saurashtra language since 2007. A former Sanskrit Professor of Sourashtra College in Madurai, T.R. Damodaran won the award for his book Jiva Sabda Kosam, a compilation of 1,333 Saurashtra words with English and Tamil meanings. However, Saroja Sundararajan, was also awarded for Yogendran Monnum Singaru Latun (in Tamil, 'Yogendra Thalaivarkalin Manathiley Ezhuntha Azhagiya Alaigal'), a rendition of works of Adi Sankara's Soundaryalahiri, Kanagadhara stotra and Mahishasuramarthini stotra, Natana Gopala Nayagi Swami's 'Mooschi Deshad,' 'Subramanian Mahatmiyam' and songs of Sai Baba.

== See also ==
- Saraostus
- Saurashtra Kingdom
- Saurashtra (region)
- Saurashtra (state)
- Saurashtra people
- Saurashtra script
- Saurashtra (Unicode block)
- Gujarati languages
