= List of Vellalar sub castes =

The Vellalar are a group of castes predominantly found in Tamil Nadu, a state in southern India. They are Tamil-speaking community and have historically played a significant role in the region’s agricultural and social structure. The Vellalar community is a large and heterogeneous group that has assimilated several other subcastes over time.

The Vellalar are divided into numerous subcastes, which are often distinguished by territorial affiliations and further subdivided into endogamous groups, known as caste. These subcastes can be identified by specific prefixes denoting a place of origin, and suffixes that honor social or regional distinctions, for example, Tondaimandalam Kondaikatti Vellala Mudaliar.

== Subcastes ==
The following is a list of some subcastes of the Vellalar based on region:

- Arunattu Vellalar
- Chozhia Vellalar
- Karkathar Vellalar
- Kodikaal Vellalar
- Kondaikatti Vellalar
- Kongu Vellalar, commonly known as Kongu Gounder
- Nankudi Vellalar or Narkudi Vellalar (also known as Sivakalai Pillaimar)
- Sri Lankan Vellalar
- Thondaimandala Vellalar
- Thuluva Vellalar

== See also ==
- Vellalar
- List of Vellalars
