= List of Vellalars =

Vellalar
Regions with significant populations
- Tamil Nadu, Sri Lanka, Puducherry, Kerala, Karnataka

Languages
- Tamil

Religion
- Hinduism and Christianity

Related ethnic groups
- Tamil People

Vellalars are a landowning caste in the Indian states of Tamil Nadu, Kerala, Karnataka and parts of Sri Lanka.

The Vellalar community adopts various titles, including Pillai, Mudaliar, and Gounder. These titles are used by different subcastes of the Vellalar, influenced by regional, social, and cultural factors.

== Freedom fighters and leaders ==
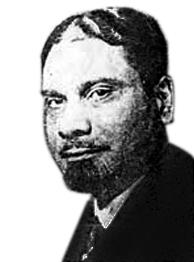
Chempakaraman Pillai

- Ariyanatha Mudaliar- Minister of Vishwanatha Nayakar who divided the whole kingdom into 72 Palayams and appointed the Palaiyakarars.
- Chempakaraman Pillai- Chempakaraman Pillai was an Indian-born political activist and revolutionary. Born in Thiruvananthapuram, to Tamil Pillai parents, he left for Europe as a youth, where he spent the rest of his active life as an Indian nationalist and revolutionary.
- Dheeran Chinnamalai Gounder – chieftain and Palayakkarar from Tamil Nadu who rose up in revolt against the British East India Company in the Kongu Nadu, Southern India.
- Kalingaraya Gounder- The Chieftain of Kongu Kingdom.
- Marudhanayagam Pillai (also known as Muhammad Yusuf Khan or Khan Sahib) – He was the first freedom fighter and was called as the hero of Madurai, he was a brave man who defeated Puli Thevar and ruled his territory. He became a rebel and revolted against The British So, they hanged him. The British army cut his dead body into pieces due to the fear of him. The dead body that was cut down was buried elsewhere in Tamil Nadu.
- Muthuranga Mudaliar- was a well known freedom-fighter from Poonamallee in Thiruvallur District. He participated in the Quit India Movement in 1942 along with Prakasam, V. V. Giri, M. Bhakthavatsalam, K. Kamaraj and other freedom fighters
- Muthu Irulappa Pillai – The Chief Minister or Pradhani Of Ramnad Kingdom. In 1789 He studied Vaigai River and Periyar River and Conceived the plan to build Mullaiperiyar Dam.
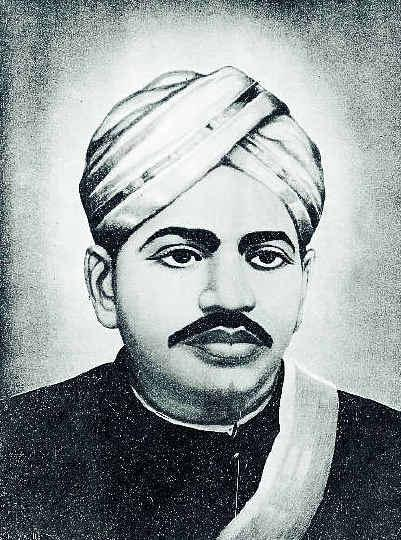
  V. O. Chidambaram Pillai in 1919
- Salem Ramaswami Mudaliar- Salem Ramaswami Mudaliar (6 September 1852 – 2 March 1892) was an Indian lawyer, politician and Indian independence activist who campaigned for India's independence.
- Thandavarayan Pillai – The Chief Minister or 'Pradhani' of Sivagangai Kingdom.
- Thanapathi Pillai – The Minister and Military Commander of Veerapandiya Kattobomman.
- Thuppaki Gounder – Freedom Fighter from Sivagangai who worked with Marudhu Pandiyar against the British.
- Vallinayagam Olaganathan Chidambaram Pillai- also known as Kappalottiya Tamizhan and Sekkizutha Semmal, was an Indian freedom fighter and former leader of the Indian National Congress. He founded the Swadeshi Steam Navigation Company in 1906 to compete against the monopoly of the British India Steam Navigation Company.

== Philanthropists ==
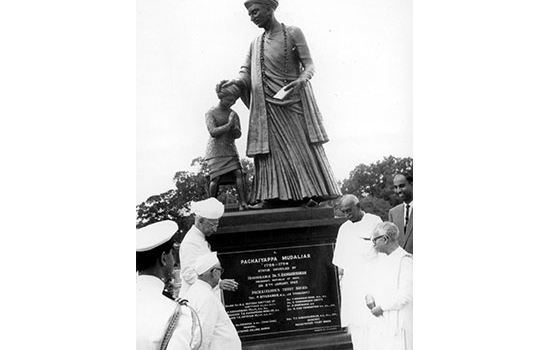
Vallal Pachaiyappa Mudaliar

- Arcot Narrainswamy Mudaliar - Founded the R.B.A.N.M.'s Educational Charities and R.B.A.N.M.'s Chattram and other charities.
- Vallal Pachaiyappa Mudaliar - Founder of Pachayappa Educational Trust.
- V. L. Ethiraj - Barrister and philanthropist who founded Ethiraj College for Women.

== Politics ==
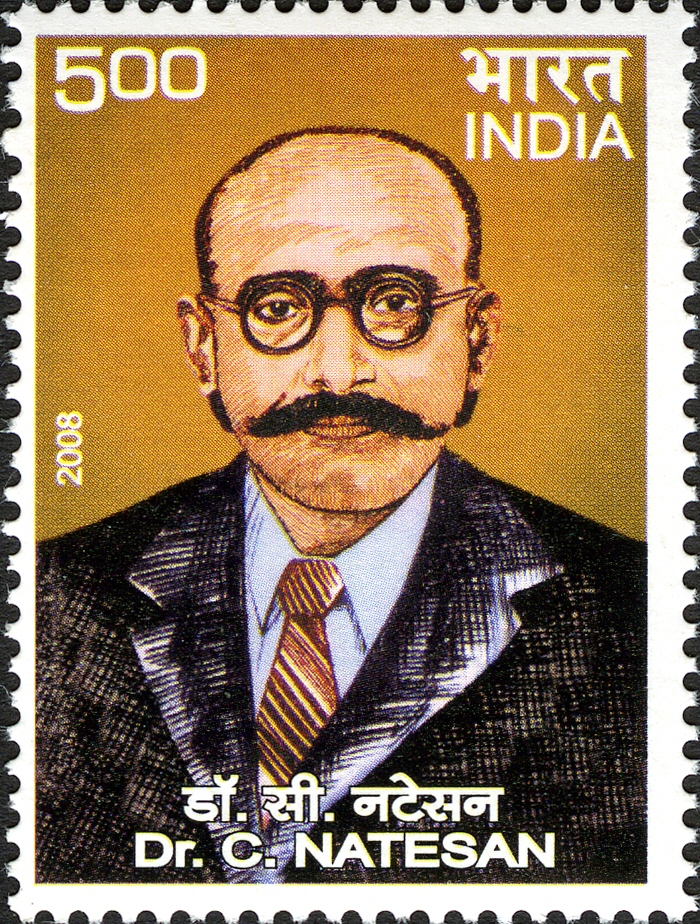
C. Natesa Mudaliar

- A. C. Shanmugam- is the founder and president of the Puthiya Needhi Katchi, a caste-based political party for the thuluva Vellalar caste in Tamil Nadu, India. He is also the founder and chancellor of Dr. M.G.R. Educational and Research Institute, Rajarajeswari Group of Institutions, and ACS group of institutions in Arani.
- A. Lakshmanaswami Mudaliar- Sir Arcot Lakshmanaswami Mudaliar (14 October 1887 – 15 April 1974) was an Indian educationist and physician. He was also the Deputy Leader of the Indian delegation to the First World Health Assembly in Geneva in 1948. He was elected as the chairman of the World Health Organization Executive Board in 1949 and 1950, was vice-president of the Eighth World Health Assembly in 1955 and President of the Fourteenth World Health Assembly in 1961. He was knighted in the 1945 New Year Honours, Awarded the Padma Bhushan in 1954 and the Padma Vibhushan in 1963., He served as General President of the 46th Indian Science Congress held in 1959.
- A. Ranganatha Mudaliar- Arcot Ranganatha Mudaliar (29 June 1879 – 8 July 1950) was an Indian politician and theosophist from Bellary. He served as the Minister of Public Health and Excise for the Madras Presidency from 1926 to 1928.
- Arcot Ranganatha Mudaliar- was an Indian politician and theosophist from Bellary. He served as the Minister of Public Health and Excise for the Madras Presidency from 1926 to 1928.
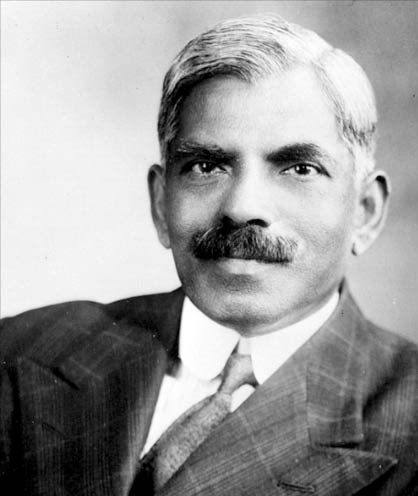
- Arcot Ramasamy Mudaliar
  Arcot Ramasamy Mudaliar- Arcot Ramasamy Mudaliar was born in a Tamil-speaking Thuluva Vellalar (Arcot Mudaliar) family. KCSI - Founder Chairman of UNESCO and the Diwan of Mysore.
- C. Natesa Mudaliar- Dr. C. Natesa Mudaliar (1875–1937), also known as Natesan, was an Indian politician and activist of the Dravidian Movement from what is now the Indian state of Tamil Nadu. He was one of the founders of the Justice Party, along with P. Theagaraya Chetty and Dr. T. M. Nair. He is often mentioned as Dravida Thanthai (lit., Father of the Dravidian Movement).
- C. S. Ratnasabhapathy Mudaliar- Chinna Seevaram Ratnasabhapathy Mudaliar OBE was an Indian industrialist and politician who served as a member of the Madras Legislative Council from 1926 to 1936. His family hails from Seevaram village near Cheyyar of North Arcot district.
- C. Subramaniam Gounder- Father of the Indian Green Revolution, Vetaran Congress Leader, Former Union Finance Minister, Deputy chairperson of the Planning Commission, Governor of Maharashtra. Bharat Ratna (the nation's highest civilian honour) in 1998.
- Edappadi K Palaniswami- Edappadi Karuppa Palaniswami (born 12 May 1954), often referred to by his initials E.P.S., is an Indian politician who is the current leader of opposition in the Tamil Nadu Legislative Assembly. He served as the seventh chief minister of Tamil Nadu, from 2017 to 2021. He has been the General Secretary of All India Anna Dravida Munnetra Kazhagam (AIADMK) since 28 March 2023. Previously, Palaniswami has served as the interim general secretary (2022–23), joint co-ordinator (2017–22) and headquarters secretary (2016–22) of AIADMK.
- Isari Velan- was an Indian actor, politician and former Member of the Legislative Assembly of Tamil Nadu.
- P.T.R Palanivel Rajan- Ponnambala Thyaga Rajan Palanivel Rajan (27 February 1932 – 20 May 2006) was an Indian politician.
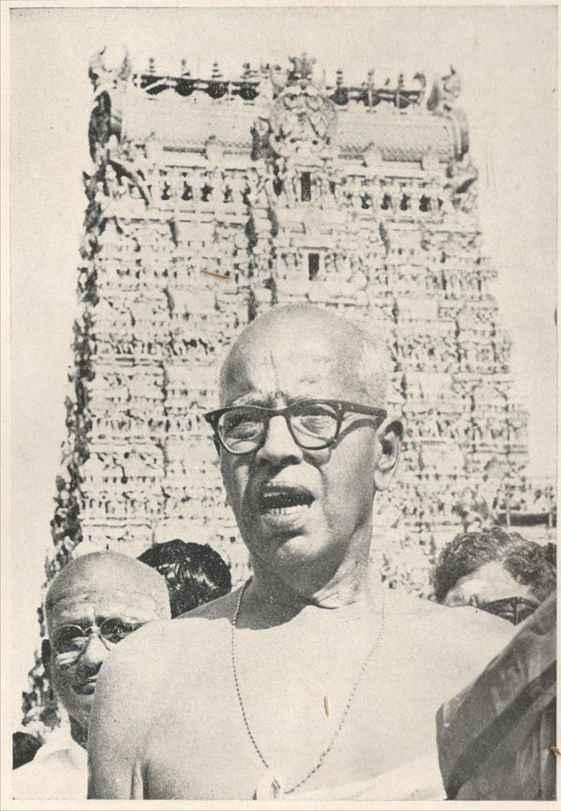
- P. T. Rajan
  P.T Rajan- Sir Ponnambala Thiaga Rajan (22 April 1892 – 25 September 1974) was the First Minister of Madras Presidency from 4 April 1936, to 24 August 1936 (143 Days). He was also the last President of the Justice Party. P. T. Rajan was born in a Thondaimandala mudaliar family in Uthamapalayam.
- P. U. Shanmugam- P U Shanmugam, affectionately called as Paa Vuu Saa (15 August 1924 – 11 April 2007) was an Indian politician and former minister of Tamil Nadu for Internal affairs, former minister of Public works, former minister of public health and various other portfolios on various tenures. The Dravidian veteran also worked as the Organisation Secretary of DMK and the 3rd General Secretary of AIADMK.
- Palanivel Thiagarajan- Dr. Palanivel Thiagarajan (PTR) is an Indian politician and the current Minister of Information Technology and Digital Services of Tamil Nadu. He was elected to the Tamil Nadu Legislative Assembly election in 2016 and 2021 from Madurai Central.
- R. N. Arogyasamy Mudaliar- Diwan Bahadur Royapuram Nallaveeran Arogyaswamy Mudaliar (18 April 1870 – 30 January 1933) was an Indian politician and civil engineer who served as the Minister of Excise, Medical Administration and six other departments in the Madras Presidency from 1926 to 1928
- S. Muthiah Mudaliar- Sami Muthiah Mudaliar CIE (1883 – 15 July 1953) was an Indian politician and legislator of the Justice Party. He studied and graduated in law and commenced practice as a lawyer. He joined the Justice Party and later, the Swarajya Party and served as legislator from 1923 to 1930. From 1928 to 1930, he served as the Minister of Education and Excise in P. Subbarayan's government. He returned to the Justice Party in the late twenties and participated in the Madras 1938 Anti-Hindi agitations.
- T. M. Kaliannan Gounder- was an Indian politician who served as a member of the Provisional Parliament of India and as a member of the Legislative Assembly MLA, Member of the Legislative Council MLC of Tamil Nadu. He was the last surviving member of the first parliament of India (Provisional Parliament 1950–1952) and was one of the few surviving members of the first assembly of Tamil Nadu (formerly Madras) State (MLA 1952 Rasipuram, MLA 1957 Tiruchengode, MLA 1962 Tiruchengode).
- V. R. Nedunchezhiyan- was an Indian politician and writer. He served thrice as the Chief Minister of the state of Tamil Nadu, India.

== Civil Service and Judiciary ==
- Kanakaraya Mudali - Chief dubash and broker for the French East India Company.

== Spiritual ==
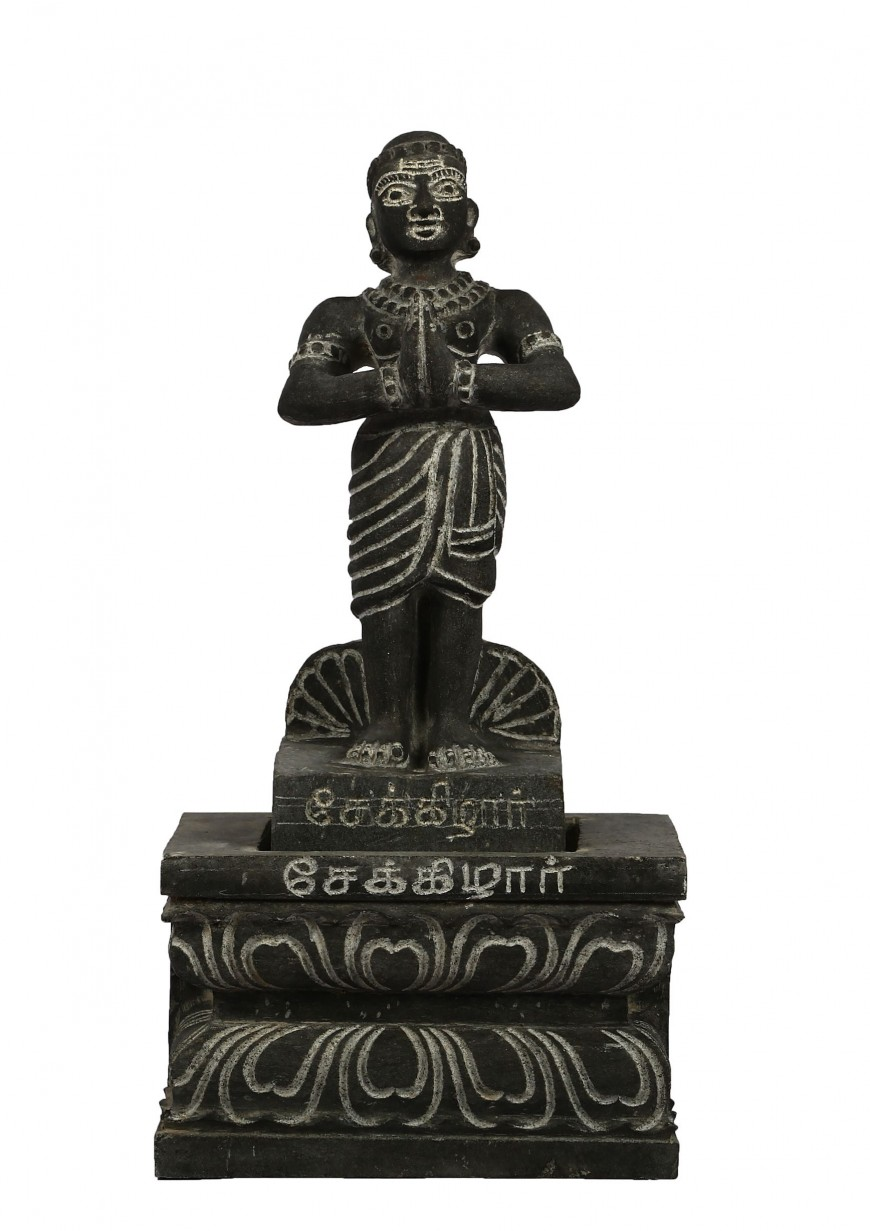
Sekkilhar

- Appar - also referred to as Tirunāvukkarasar or Navukkarasar, was a seventh-century Tamil Śaiva poet-saint. Born in a peasant Vellalar family, raised as an orphan by his sister, he lived about 80 years and is generally placed sometime between 570 and 650 CE.
- Arumuka Navalar – born as Kandar Arumugam Pillai, a Hindu reformer.
- Nammalvar – He was one of the twelve Alvar saints of Tamil Nadu, India, who are known for their affiliation to the Vaishnava tradition of Hinduism. The verses of the Alvars are compiled as the Naalayira Divya Prabandham, where praises are sung of 108 temples that are classified as divine realms, called the Divya Desams.
- Sekkizhar – Sēkkilān Mādēvadigal Rāmadēva (12th century CE), known popularly by his family name as Sekkizhar, was a saint and a contemporary of Kulottunga Chola II. He compiled and wrote the Periya Puranam (Great Story or Narrative) in 4253 verses, recounting the life stories of the sixty-three Shaiva Nayanars, the devotees of Shiva. Sekkilhar himself was later canonised and his work, the Periyapuranam became the twelfth and final book of the sacred Sai
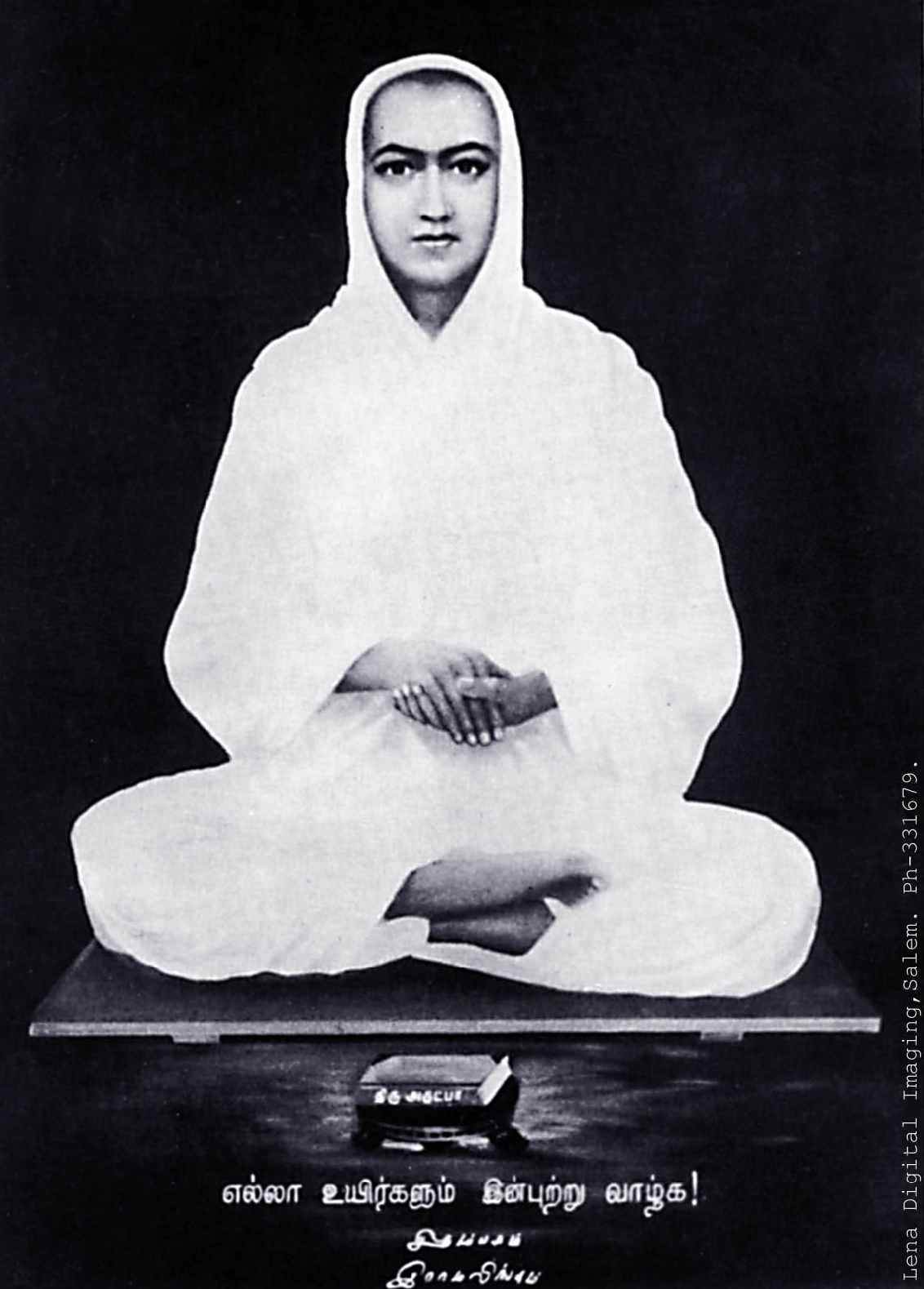
- Ramalinga Adigal
  Thayumanavar or Tayumanavar – (Tamil: தாயுமானவர் Tāyumānavar) (1705–1744) was a Tamil spiritual philosopher from Tamil Nadu, India. Thayumanavar articulated the Saiva Siddhanta philosophy. He wrote several Tamil hymns of which 1454 are available. His first four songs were sung 250 years ago at the Congress of Religions in Tiruchirappalli. His poems follow his own mystical experience, but they also outline the philosophy of Hinduism, and the Tirumandiram by Saint Tirumular in its highest form, one that is at once devotional and nondual, one that sees God as both immanent and transcendent.
- Thycaud Ayyavu Swamikal (1814 – 20 July 1909) was a spiritualist and a social reformer in kerala
- Vallalar (Born – Ramalingam) – A Hindu Saint who said God is none other than Light and espoused the veneration of the radiant flame emanating from a lit lamp.

== Literature ==
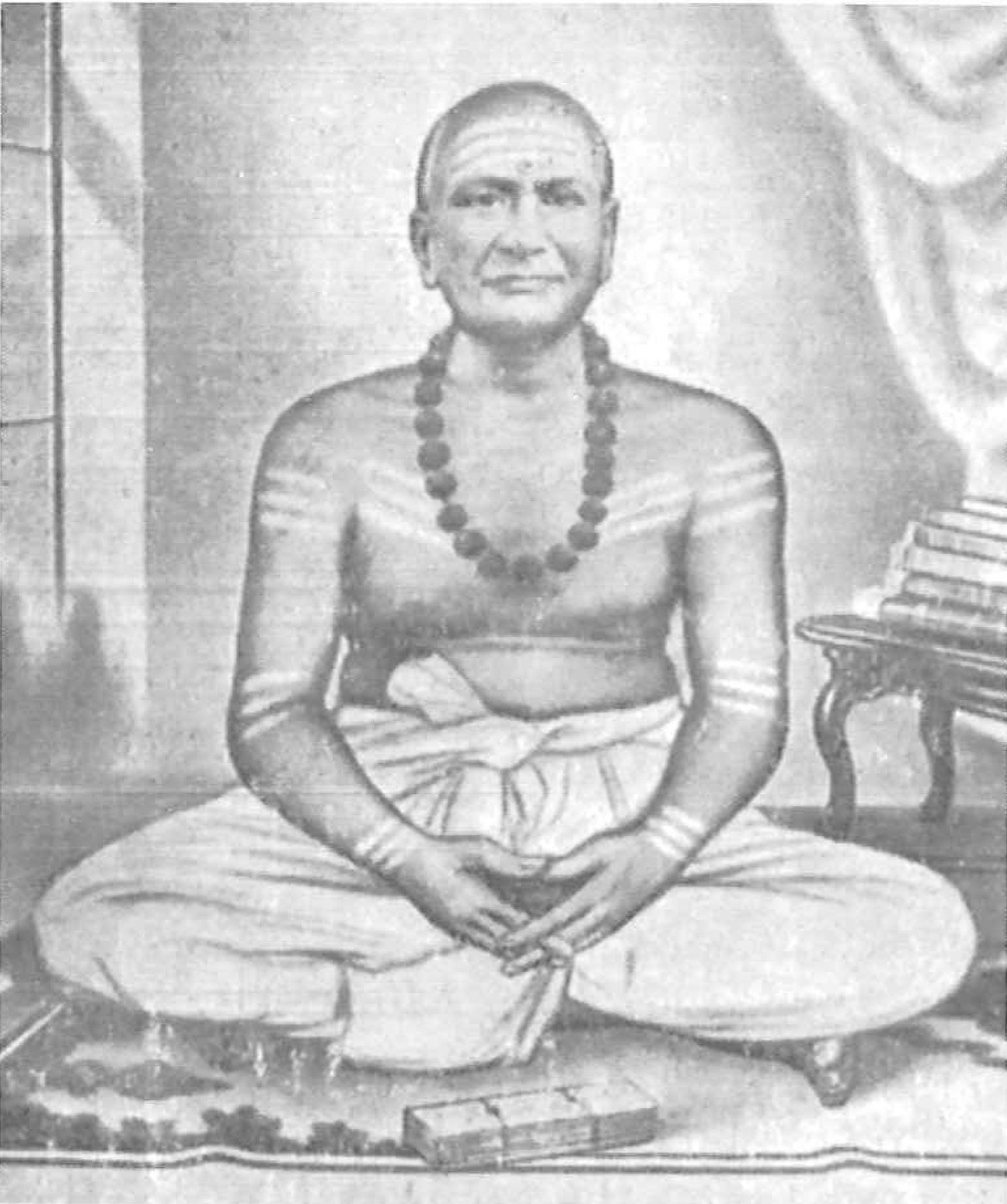
Meenakshisundaram Pillai

- K. A. P. Viswanatham Pillai- was a Tamil scholar, orator and social activist.
- Kavimani Desigavinayagam Pillai – was a Tamil poet. Asiya Jothi, Nanjil Nattu Marumakkal Vazhi Manmiyam, and the translation of the work of Omar Khayyam are his masterpieces. He is known for his poetry. In 1940 the Tamil Sangam at its 7th annual conference held at Madras (now Chennai) honoured Desigavinayagam Pillai with the title "Kavimani". On 21 October 2005, he was commemorated on an Indian postage stamp.
- Kovoor Kilar- was a poet of the Sangam period, to whom 18 verses of the Sangam literature have been attributed, including verse 38 of the Tiruvalluva Maalai.
- Makaral Karthikeya Mudaliar- was an Indian scholar and poet of Tamil ancestry, Mudaliar authored Velir varalaatru maanbu, Aathichudi Muthar Viruthiyurai, Tamil Solvilakkam, and Mozhi nool.
- Manonmaniam Sundaram Pillai – He was an Indian scholar, noted for the famous Tamil drama Manonmaniyam. as well as the state song of Tamil Nadu Tamil Thai Valthu.
- Mahavidvaan Meenakshi Sundaram Pillai – He was a Tamil scholar and teacher of U. V. Swaminatha Iyer, a Tamil scholar and researcher who was instrumental in bringing many long-forgotten works of classical Tamil literature to light. Pillai's important contribution is in the form of temple history called Thala Varalaru for ninety temples in Tamil Nadu.
- Mu. Varadarajan- also known as Mu. Va. and Varatharasanar, was a Tamil scholar, author and academic from Tamil Nadu, India. He was a prolific writer whose published works include 13 novels, 6 plays, 2 short story collections, 11 essay anthologies, a book on the history of Tamil literature, books on Tamil linguistics and children's books. During 1961–71, he was the head of the Tamil department at the University of Madras. In 1961, he was awarded the Sahitya Akademi Award for Tamil for his novel Agal Vilakku. During 1971–74, he was the vice-chancellor of the University of Madurai.
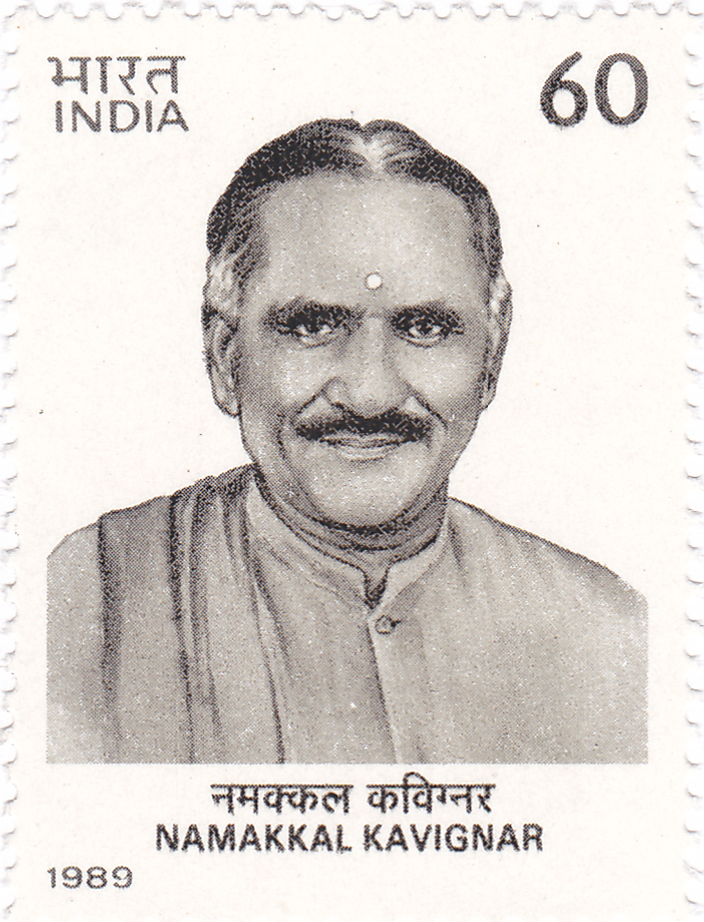
  Venkatarama Ramalingam Pillai
- Papanasa Mudaliar - An early Carnatic music composer who lived in what is now Tamil Nadu, India.
- Thirikooda Rasappa Kavirayar – The author of Thirukutrala Kuravanji.
- Thiru. V. Kalyanasundaram- better known by his initials Thiru. Vi. Ka, was an Indian scholar, essayist and activist for the Tamil language. The analytical depth of his commentaries on classical Tamil literature and philosophy, and the clear, fluid style of his prose. His works, along with those of V. O. Chidambaram Pillai, Maraimalai Adigal, and Arumuka Navalar, are considered to have defined the style of modern Tamil prose.
- Venkatarama Ramalingam Pillai – sometimes called Namakkal Kavignar, was a Tamil poet from Tamil Nadu, India and independence fighter who wrote poems about independence. He wrote hundreds of poems. He also participated in the Salt Satyagraha against the British government in 1930 and went to jail for one year. He received the "Padmabhushan" award in 1971 from the Indian government.

== Educationists, Doctors, Scientists, and Academicians ==
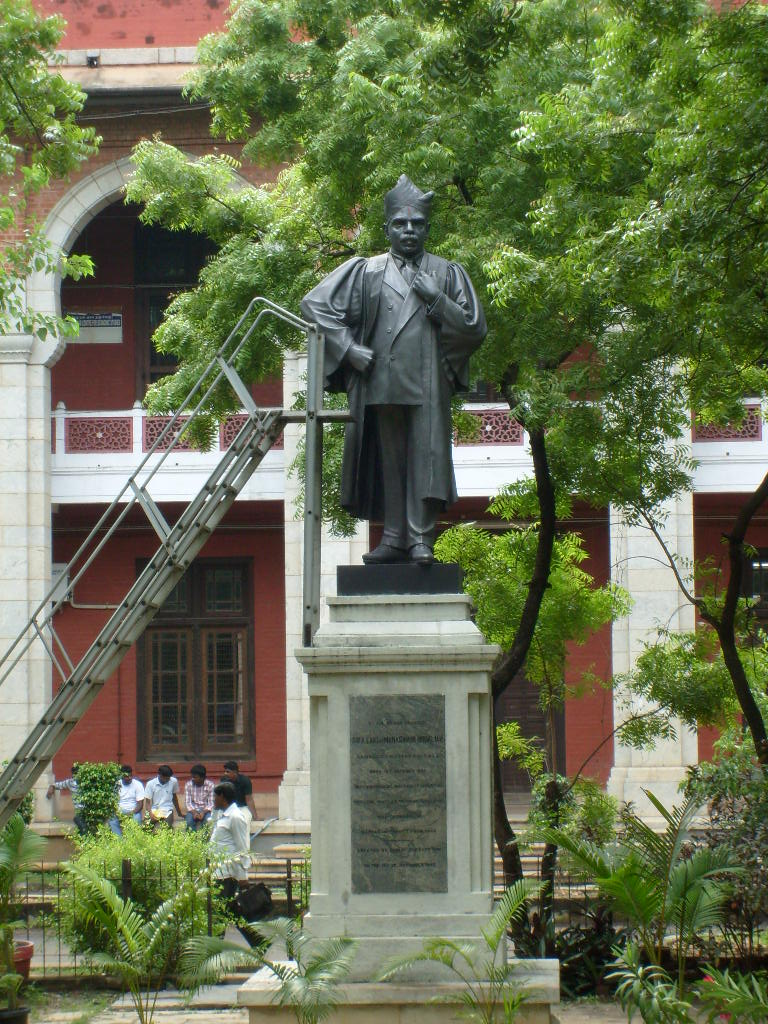
A.Lakshmanaswami Mudaliar

- Arcot Lakshmanaswami Mudaliar - First Indian Principal of Madras Medical College and Vice Chancellor of the University of Madras.
- Arcot Ramachandran - Scientist, author, and Under-Secretary-General of UN-Habitat.
- Dr. B. M. Sundaravadanan - Chairman of Tamil Nadu Medical Council.
- Dr. M. R. Gurusamy Mudaliar - Renowned Indian medical practitioner.

== See also ==
- Vellalar
- List of Vellalar sub castes
