= Kodikaal Vellalar =

Kodikaal Vellalar is a subcaste of Vellalar from Indian state of Tamil Nadu.

== Etymology ==
The earliest occurrence of the term Velaalar (வேளாளர்) in Sangam literature is in Paripadal where it is used in the sense of a landowner. The word Vellalar (வெள்ளாளர் ) may come from the root Vellam for flood, which gave rise to various rights of land; and it is because of the acquisition of land rights that the Vellalar got their name. The term Velaalar (வேளாளர்) can be derived from the word Vel (வேள்), Vel being a title that was borne by the Velir chieftains of Sangam age among other things. The Vellalars who do "Kodikaal" (betel leaves) farming came to be known as Kodikaal Vellalar. They predominantly use title "Pillai" as a surname.

"Kodikaal Vellalar (Kodikaal Pillaimar)

Surname - Pillai, Moopanar."

-Tamilar Varalaru by Devaneya Pavanar.

== History ==
The Vellalars have a long cultural history that goes back to over two millennia in southern India, where once they were the ruling and land-owning community.

It can be known from Sekkhizhar that they used to protect the country after the kings and this Vellalar is said to be Karkathar of who stood as a hostage for the sake of Indra for the Pandyan who imprisoned Clouds, Cholan's Daughter Nagavalli who was married to Nagakanni is called "Kodikaal Vellalar" because he produced the betel vine in this land, and "Tuluvar" of Torathal who was brought from Tuluva country to Thondai country by Chola.

== Distribution ==
Kodikaal Vellalars are mainly distributed in Pandya Nadu-(Lit:Madurai, Theni, Dindugul, Ramanathapuram, Thirunelveli, Virudhunagar, Tenkasi, Sivagangai, Thootukudi etc..,)

== See also ==
- List of Vellalar sub castes
- List of Vellalars
