= Arunattu Vellalar =

Subcates of Vellalar in Tamil Nadu, South India

Regions with significant populations
- Tamil Nadu

Languages
- Tamil

Religion
- Hinduism

Related ethnic groups
- Vellalar

The Arunattu Vellalar are a Tamil-speaking agrarian community predominantly found in Tamil Nadu, India. They are a sub-caste of the broader Vellalar caste and mainly depend on farming, as many own agricultural land. Some also work in business, government jobs or as laborers, while a few are moneylenders. The term "Arunattu" signifies their ancestral origins tied to specific regions in Tiruchirappalli, Tamil Nadu.

== Etymology ==
The earliest occurrence of the term Velaalar (வேளாளர்) in Sangam literature is in Paripadal where it is used in the sense of a landowner. The term Velaalar (வேளாளர்) can be derived from the word Vel (வேள்), Vel being a title that was borne by the Velir chieftains of Sangam age among other things.

The word Vellalar (வெள்ளாளர் ) may come from the root Vellam for flood, which gave rise to various rights of land; and it is because of the acquisition of land rights that the Vellalar got their name.

The literal meaning of arunattu is 'belonging to six regions' (aru=six nadu=region).

== History ==
In the past, the Tiruchchirappalli area was divided into 13 regions, of which six were given by the native Kongu Vellala Gounder to the Arunattu Vellalar, namely Tiruppadayurnadu, Kachurpurattupathu, Valluvappanadu, Mela Valluvappanadu, Kaligarinadu and Amurnadu. They use the title Pillai.

== Origins and Social Status ==
The Arunattu Vellalar trace their roots to Tamil society's feudal agrarian system. Historically, their primary occupation has been farming, with many owning agricultural land. Over time, some have diversified into business, government service and labor. A few also engage in moneylending.

== Caste-based Reservation Status ==
The Arunattu Vellalar do not avail any benefits under the reservation quota for Backward castes.

== Distribution ==
They are concentrated in Tiruchirappalli district, parts of Namakkal, Salem, Chennai, Coimbatore and Dindigul districts of Tamil Nadu and have spread across Tirupati of Andhra Pradesh, Sri Lanka, Malaysia and Singapore.

== See also ==
- List of Vellalar sub castes
- List of Vellalars
