= Poovaipalayam =

Village in India

- Village
- Location in Tamil Nadu, India Poovaipalayam (India)
- Coordinates: 10°31′51″N 77°53′55″E
- Country: India
- State: Tamil Nadu
- District: Dindigul district

Government
  - Type: Tamilnadu
  - Body: Village

Population (2021)auto
  - Total: 1,500

Languages
  - Official: Kongu Tamil, Tamil
- Time zone: UTC+5:30 (IST)
- PIN: 624710
- Telephone code: 04551
- Sex ratio: 55 percent/45 percent ♂/♀
- Website: https://instagram.com/poovai_uravugal_

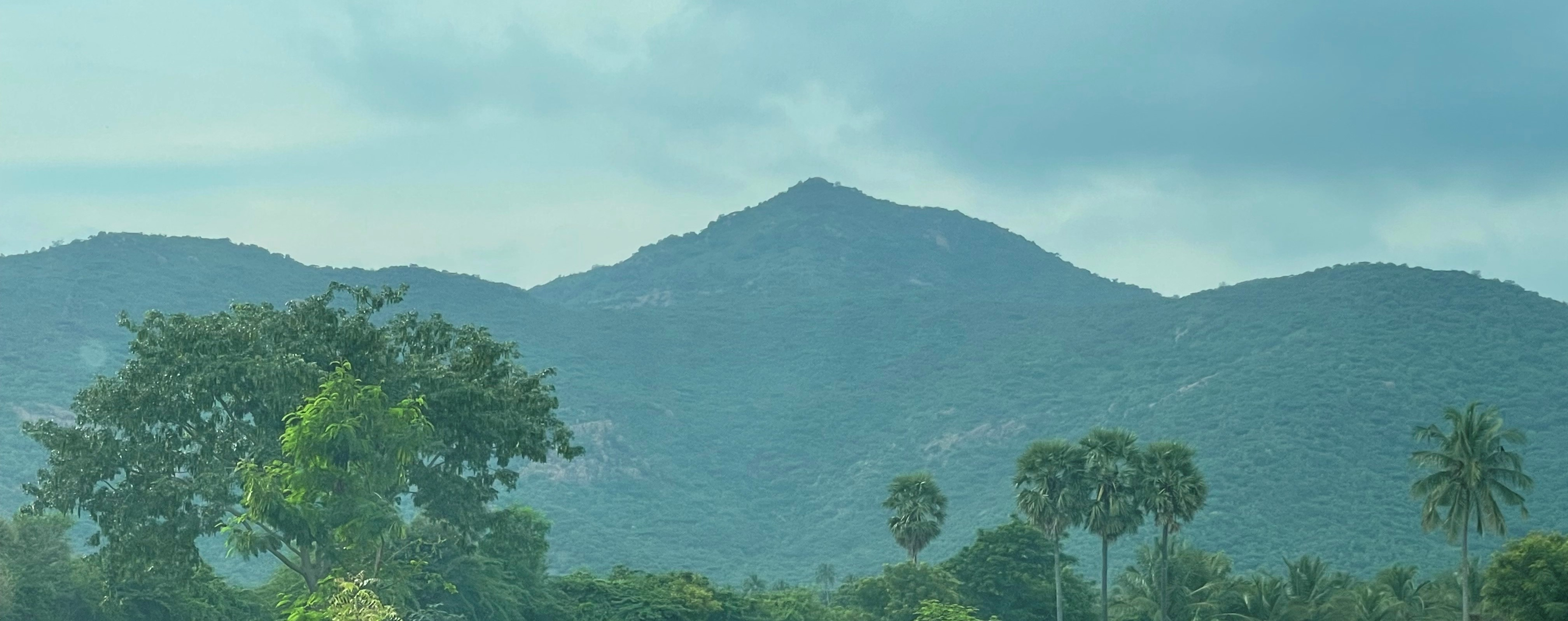

Poovaipalayam, also called "Sithakkaattur" (population approximately 1500 in 2021) is a village in Dindigul district, Tamil Nadu, India. It is 8 km from the nearest town, Vedasandur, and 22 km from the district headquarters, Dindigul. The villagers are primarily farmers who grow drumsticks, onion, chili peppers, gooseberry, tomato, eggplants, tobacco, and lentils. The villagers belong to the Kongu Vellala Gounder community. Poovaipalayam is under Oddancatram taluk and in the same constituency.

== Geography ==
Located at 10°31′51″N 77°53′55″E, Poovaipalayam is approximately 2500 km from New Delhi, 1350 km from Mumbai, 450 km from Chennai, 360 km from Bangalore and 140 km from Coimbatore, 80 km from Madurai. It is surrounded by mountains.

== Demographics ==
As of the 2001 census, Poovaipalayam had a population of 700. Men constitute 55 percent of the population and women 45 percent. Poovaipalayam has an average literacy rate of 71 percent, higher than the national average of 59.5 percent; the male literacy rate is 81 percent, and the female literacy rate is 61 percent. Two percent of the population is under six years of age.

== Transportation ==
Poovaipalayam does not have any public transportation that connects directly to it; people generally use their own vehicles to travel outside the village. The nearest public transportation is one kilometer away.

== Temples ==
There are several Hindu temples in the area:

- Sri Vinayakar Temple
- Sri Kuppanna Swamy Temple
- Sri Kannimar Temple (Main God)
- Sri Karumalai Perumal Temple (at the top of the Karumalai)
- Sri Kallambarai Kannimar Temple (Sengattu Thottam)

== Banks ==
- Indian Overseas Bank Saalaiyur Naalroad
- Bank of India Puliyamarathukottai
- State bank of India Vedasandur
- Tamil Nadu mercantile bank Vedasandur
- Canara bank Vedasandur
- Karur vysya bank Vedasandur
- Indian bank Vedasandur

== Education ==
There is one elementary school in the village, but it has been closed permanently due to lower enrollment.
