= Kalabhra dynasty =

Ancient dynasty in South India

Kalabhra Kingdom
- 3rd century CE–6th century CE
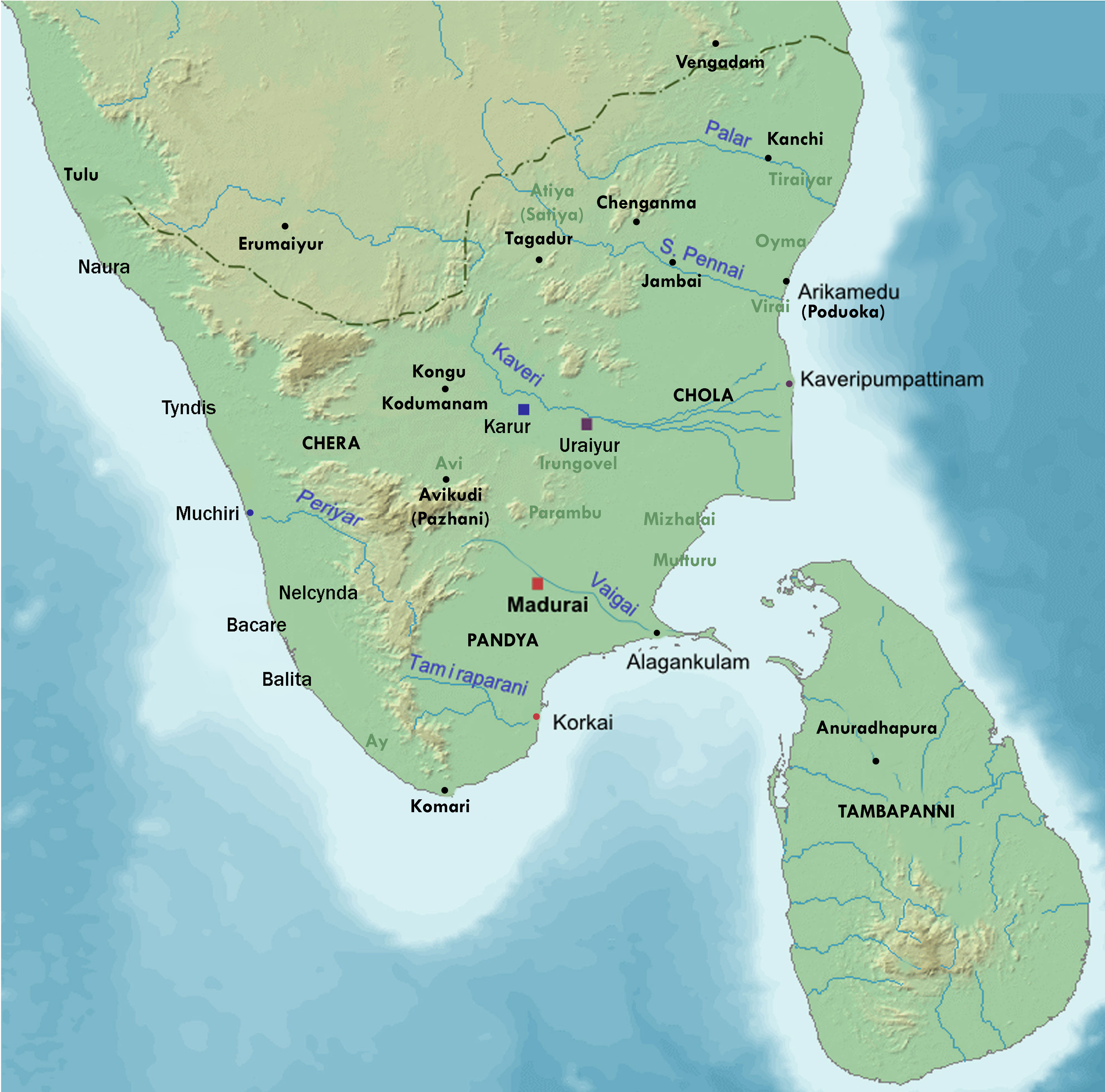
- Kalabhra ruled parts or all of ancient Tamilakam
- Capital: Kaveripumpattinam
- Common languages: Tamil; Prakrit; Sanskrit; Pali
- Religion: Jainism (major); Buddhism; Ajivikism
- Government: Monarchy
- History
  - Established: 3rd century CE
  - Disestablished: 6th century CE
Preceded by	Succeeded by
Three Crowned Kings; Ancient Tamil country	Pallava dynasty; Pandyan dynasty
- Today part of: India

The Kalabhra dynasty (also called Kaḷabrar, Kaḷappirar, Kallupura or Kalvar) were rulers of all or parts of Tamil region sometime between the 3rd century and 6th century CE, after the ancient dynasties of the early Cholas, the early Pandyas and Chera. Information about the origin and reign of the Kalabhras is uncertain and scarce. It is believed that they were once the feudatories of the Pallavas. Prof. M. S. Ramaswami Aiyangar, in his 1922 book "Studies in South Indian Jainism" asserted that the Kalabhra period was 'The Augustan age of Tamil literature". He also noted that many Pallava and Pandya records describe how the Kalabhras defeated the Cholas, Pandyas, and Cheras and established their rule. The Kalabhra era is sometimes referred to as the "dark period" of Tamil history, and information about it is generally inferred from any mentions in the literature and inscriptions that are dated many centuries after their era ended.

Historian Upinder Singh states that Shivaskandavarman rise in the 4th century, as evidenced by inscriptions, show Kalabhras were not in power at that time near rivers Penner and Vellar (close to Kaveri). The Kalabhras dynasty had ended for certain by the last quarter of 6th century when Pallava Simhavishnu consolidated his rule up to the Kaveri river, south of which the Pandyas led by Kadunkon consolidated their power. Cholas became subordinates of Pallavas and they were already ruling Telugu region of Rayalaseema.

Some early scholars, including M. S. Venkatasamy and S. K. Aiyangar, suggested that the Mutharaiyars might have had links to the Kalabhra period, but this view remains speculative and is not supported by inscriptional or archaeological evidence. Later studies of Pudukkottai inscriptions recording clearly Tamil personal names such as Maran, Meenavan and Tennavan - indicate that the Mutharaiyars were a Tamil-origin group, and therefore the Kalabhra-Mutharaiyar ancestral connection is not considered an established historical conclusion.

== Identification ==
The origin and identity of the Kalabhras is uncertain. Information about the origin and reign of the Kalabhras is uncertain and scarce.

Their proposed roots vary from southeast region of modern Karnataka, Kalappalars of Kaarkaathaar community, to Kallar chieftains.

One theory states that they were probably hill tribes that rose out of obscurity to become a power in South India. Historical documents of the Vettuva Gounder community interpreted by the Kongu historian Pon Dheepankar show that the Karkathars, Vanniars and Maravars (other than the Kondayankottai caste), Kallars, who were a formerly a denotified tribe of Tamil Nadu were the Kalabhras. Other theories state that they were Karnatas probably from north of Tamil-speaking region (modern southeast Karnataka), or on etymological grounds may have been the Kalappalars of Karkarthar community or the Kalavar chieftains. Kalabhra or Kalamba is to be equated with Kalava ( = Kallar ) or Kadamba .

According to Kulke and Rothermund, "nothing is known about the origins or tribal affiliations" of the Kalabhras, and their rule is called the "Kalabhra Interregnum". They are reviled in texts written centuries later, particularly by Tamil Hindu scholars. This has led some scholars to infer that the Kalabhra rulers may have discontinued grants to Hindu temples, possibly because they were originally Jains and strong adherents of Jainism, while also extending support to other Śramaṇic traditions like Buddhism and Ajivika during their rule. Other scholars suggest that much of their literary and cultural contribution may have been lost or destroyed during the later Bhakti movement. However, the textual support for these conjectures is unclear. In support of their possible Jaina patronage, is the 10th-century Jain text on grammar which quotes a poem that some scholars attribute to Acchuta Vikkanta, a Kalabhra king. A non-Tamil language Buddhist text Vinayaviniccaya by Buddhadatta was composed in the 5th-century Tamil region. According to Shu Hikosaka, Buddhadatta in this Pali language text mentions "Putamarikalam in the Chola country". According to Karl Potter in Encyclopedia of Indian Philosophies: Buddhist philosophy from 360 to 650 AD, multiple scholars place the 5th-century Buddhadatta in the Chola kingdom near Kaveri river. According to Arunachalam, the Pali manuscripts of this text includes the name Acutavikkante Kalambakulanandane and therefore he states Acutavikkante must have been a Kalabhra king. However, the oldest surviving Vinayaviniccaya manuscript in Pali does not have that name, it has Kalabbha. This could be Kalabhra.

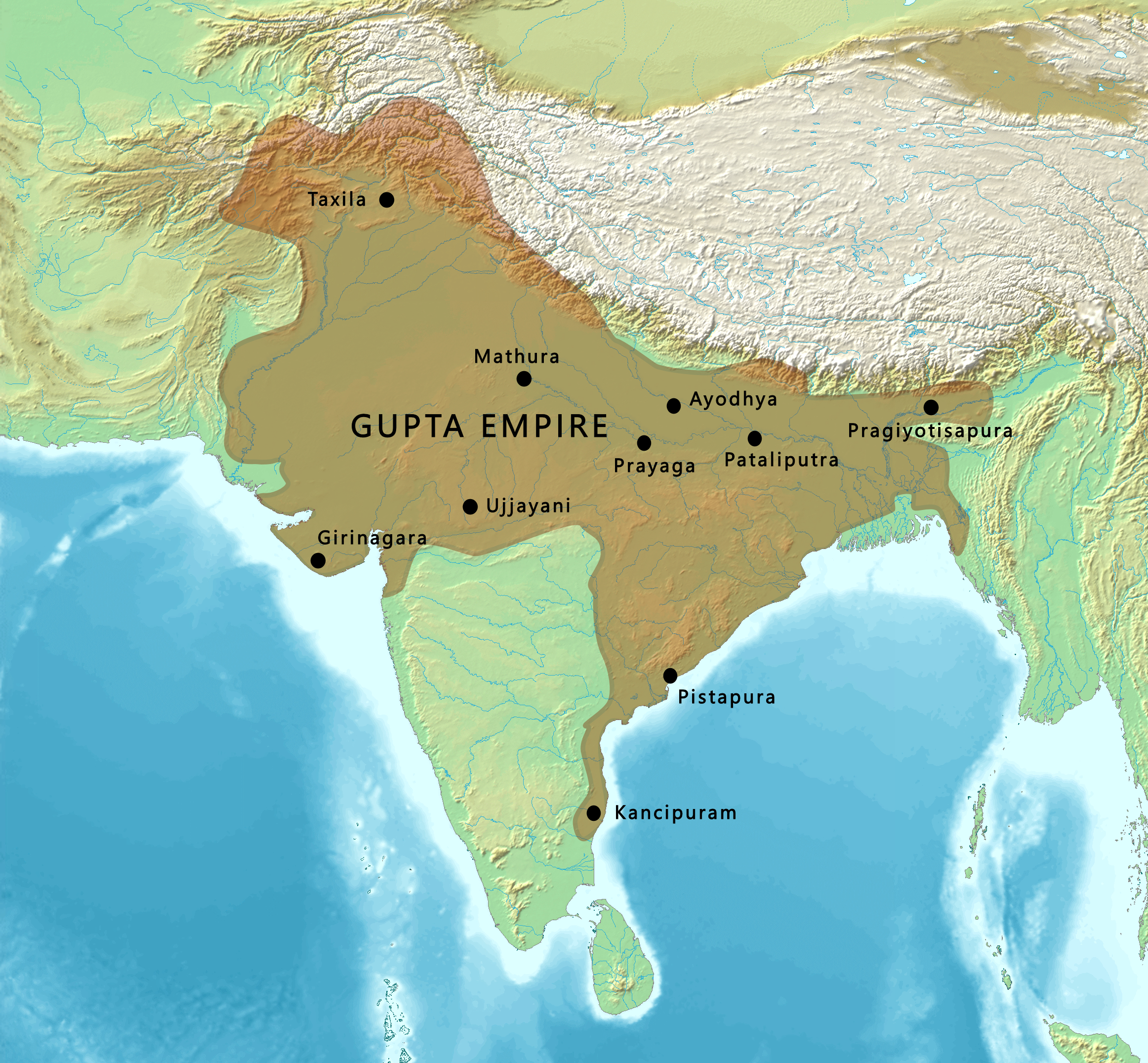
Location of the Kalabhras and neighbouring polities circa 400-450 CE.

Buddhadatta in his manuals (in the Nigamanagātha of Vinayavinicchaya, verse 3179) identifies his patron as follows:

Accut' Accutavikkante Kalambakulanandane
mahin samanusāsante āraddho ca samāpito.

In the time of the immortal Accutavikkante, the pride of the Kalamba family
this work was accomplished.

and once again the tika (colophon) adds:

Kalambhakulavamsa jāte Accutavikkamanāme Colarājini
Colarattham samanusāsante
ayam vinicchayo mayā āraddho ceva samāpito cāti

This work Vinicchaya was accomplished,
when the king of Cholas, Accutavikkaman,
born in the lineage of the Kalamba family was ruling the earth.

Amritasagara, a Jain poet of the 10th century CE and the author of the works Yapparungalam and Yapparungalakkarikai, has also written a few verses about Achyuta Vikranta.

A few verses of the Tamil Navalar Caritai, a later work, is sometimes identified as glorifying Accuta Vikranta. It describes the three kings Chera, Chola and Pandya paying obeisance to king Accuta when they were taken captive.

According to Burton Stein, the Kalabhra interregnum may represent a strong bid by non-peasant (Tribal) warriors for power over the fertile plains of Tamil region with support from the heterodox Indian religious tradition (Jainism and Buddhism). This may have led to persecution of the peasants and urban elites of the Brahmanical religious traditions (Hinduism), who then worked to remove the Kalabhras and retaliated against their persecutors after returning to power. In contrast, R.S. Sharma states the opposite theory and considers "Kalabhras as an example for peasant revolt to the state" - with tribal elements, albeit around the 6th century. All these theories are hampered by the fact that there is a "profound lack of evidence for the events or nature of Kalabhra rule", states Rebecca Darley. A few consider the Kalabhras to be a militant branch of the Jainas who were opposed to the Historical Vedic religion and this resulted in their vilification in later times.

=== In epigraphs ===
==== Pulankurichi inscription ====
The earliest Kalabhra inscription available is the Pulankurichi (Tamil Nadu) epigraph of king Chēndan Kurran (Kootran) dated to 270 CE. It is also one of the earliest inscriptions in Tamil and extends to over 15 metres in length. It refers to the administrative divisions of the kingdom and also to Vedic sacrifices and temples. Scholar Kamil Zvelebil indicates that the language of the inscription is almost identical to classical Tamil similar to the one used in the Tolkappiyam and Sangam texts.

==== 8th-century Velvikudi grant inscription ====
A much-cited and discussed epigraphical evidence for the existence of Kalabhras is the 155-lines-long 8th-century Velvikudi grant copper plate inscription of Nedunjadaiyan. It was created at least 200 years after the end of the Kalabhras. It opens with an invocation to Shiva and many lines in Sanskrit written in Grantha script, followed by Tamil written in Vatteluttu script. Loaded with myth and exaggerated legends, the inscription has the following few lines about a Kalabhra king and his relatively quick end by Pandya king Kadungon (lines 39–40, translated by H. Krishna Sastri):

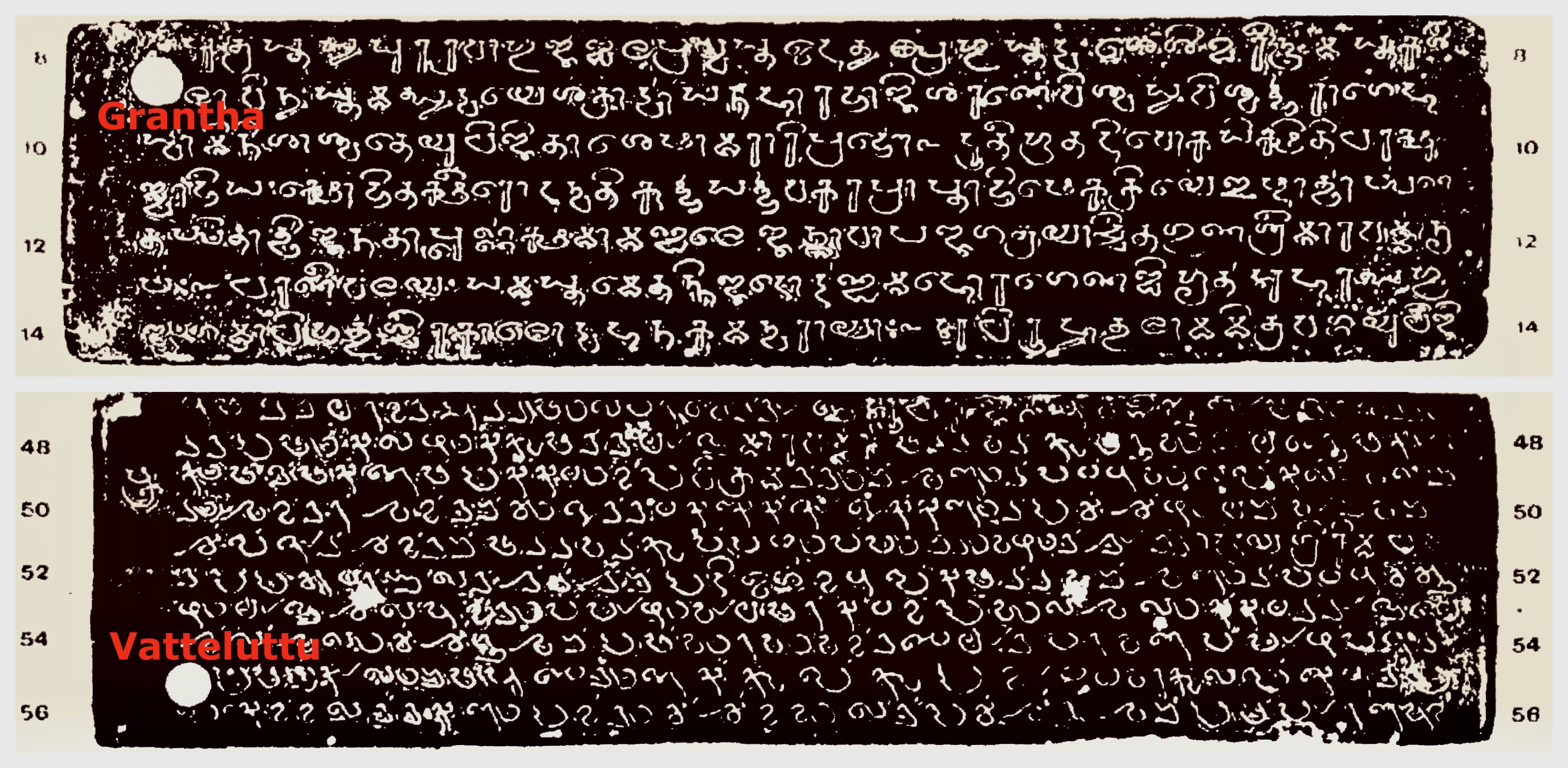
8th Century Velvikudi grant that mentions Kalabhras.

L 39: Then a Kali king named Kalabhran took possession of the extensive earth driving away numberless great kings (adhiraja) and resumed the (village mentioned Velvikudi) above.
L 40: After that, like the sun rising from the expansive ocean, the Pandyadhiraja named Kadungon, the lord of the South of sharp javelin who wore (the cloak of) dignity and was the leader of an army, sprang forth, occupied (the throne), spreading around him the brilliant splendour of (his) expanding rays (prowess), destroyed the kings of the extensive earth surrounded by the sea together with (their) strongholds and (their) fame, wielded the sceptre of justice and removed by his strength the evil destiny of the goddess of the earth whose splendour deserved to be under the shade of (his) white umbrella, by terminating by his strength the possession of her under others and establishing her in his own possession in the approved manner and destroyed the shining cities of kings who would not submit to him.

— Velvikudi grant inscription

The inscription then recites the generations of Pandya and Chola kings who followed the victorious Kadungon, and finally to king Nedunjadaiyan who ruled in the year of the inscription (c. 770 CE). The copper plate records that a Brahmin complainant said that the land grant which was given to his ancestors before Kalabhras "ignobly seized it" has not been returned so far after numerous generations (lines 103-118). The king sought evidence of past ownership, which he was provided, and thereafter the king restored the grant to the complainant. The inscription ends in Sanskrit with verses from Vaishnavism and Shaivism traditions of Hinduism, followed by the engraver's colophon. This inscription has been assumed to be an accurate historical record by some scholars, interpreted to affirm that Kalabhras existed for some period, they conquered some or all parts of the Pandyan kingdom, they seized lands belonging to Brahmin(s) and were defeated by the Pandyas (Pāṇṭiya). Some scholars dismiss the Kalabhra interregnum as for all practical purposes "a myth".

The passing mention of Kalabhras in some records have led to a number of theories for the identity of the Kalabhras. T. A. Gopinath Rao equates them with the Mutharaiyars and an inscription in the Vaikunta Perumal temple at Kanchi mentions a Mutharaiyar named as Kalavara-Kalvan. M. Raghava Iyengar, on the other hand, identifies the Kalabhras with the Vellala Kalappalars. Based on the Velvikudi plates inscription above, R. Narasimhacharya and V. Venkayya believe them to have been Karnatas. K. R. Venkatarama Iyer suggests that the Kalabhras might have emerged from the Bangalore-Chittoor region early in the 5th century.

=== Numismatics ===
A study of unearthed coins of that era show on the two sides of each coin, a range of Brahmi inscriptions in Prakrit language and images. Typically the coins show tiger, elephant, horse and fish icons. In "rare specimens", states Gupta, one finds an image of a seated Jain muni (monk) or a short sword or the Swastika symbol. Other coins of this era have images of Hindu gods and goddesses with inscriptions in Tamil or Prakrit. According to Gupta, these use of Prakrit language on the coins may reflect the non-Tamil origins of Kalabhra. Other scholars are skeptical of the coin's dating and interpretation, the origins of the coins and the impact of trade, and the rareness of Jain and Buddhist iconography.

According to Timothy Power - a scholar of Middle East and Mediterranean archaeology and history, coins and texts attest to an on-going trade between the Mediterranean, Middle East and South Indian ports such as Muziris until the 5th century, but then suddenly there is no mention of Indian ports in the Mediterranean texts around mid-6th century. This "dark age" may be related to the conquest of Kalabhras over Tamilakam in the 6th century. This period of violence and the closure of trading ports probably lasted about 75 years, around the first half of the 6th century.

== Religion and literature ==
The religious affiliation of Kalabhras is unknown. According to Peterson theory, the Kalabhras patronised the Sramana religions (Jainism, Buddhism, Ajivikas). And Peterson more particularly states that the Kalabhras were followers of the Digambara sect of Jainism.

Buddhism and Ajivikas also flourished as is evident from the writings of Buddhadatta (5th century) who wrote some of his manuals like Vinayavinicchaya and Abhidhammāvatāra among others on banks of the Kaveri river. The Kalabhras encouraged the building of Buddhist monasteries in places like Bhoothamangala and Kaveripattinam, the early Chola capital. In the Nigamanagātha of Vinayavinicchaya, Buddhatta describes how he wrote the work while staying at the monastery built by one Venhudassa (Vishnudasa) on the banks of the Kaveri in a town called Bhootamangalam. He describes his patron as The Immortal AccutaVikkante, the pride of the Kalamba family (Accut' Accutavikkante Kalambakulanandane) in Pali.

Buddhadatta vividly describes the capital Kaveripattinam as follows:

In the lovely Kaveripattana crowded with hordes of men and women from pure families endowed with all the requisites of a town with crystal clear water flowing in the river, filled with all kinds of precious stones, possessed of many kinds of bazaars, beautified by many gardens, in a beautiful and pleasant vihara built by Kanhadasa, adorned with a mansion as high as the Kailasa, and having different kinds of beautiful entrance-towers on the outer wall, I lived in an old mansion there and wrote this work..

The Kalabhras appear to have also supported Shaivites. Their inscriptions and temple patronage indicate devotion to Shiva. King Achyuta is recorded as patronising Shiva, and references to Murugan are also found in their inscriptions.

According to the Gandhipadavannanā of Buddhadatta's manual Vinayavinicchaya, the word Accuta of the patron king was used in the same context as the epithet of Narayana (Accutassa Nārāyanassa viya vikkantām ettassāti Accutavikkanto).

The early twin Tamil epics Silappatikaram (Jaina) and Manimekalai (Buddhist) were written under the patronage of the Kalabhras. During their patronage, states Peterson, Jain scholars formed an academy in Madurai and wrote texts in Sanskrit, Pali, Prakrit, and Tamil. These include classics such as the Tirukkural that condemns meat-eating (one of the cornerstones of Jainism as opposed to Hinduism as Brahmin poets like Kapilar are described to be meat-eaters in the Sangam literature), the Tamil epics, long and short devotional poems. Some of these texts "paint a picture of dialogue and mutual tolerance" between the various Indian religions in the Tamil country, according to Peterson. Other scholars disagree that these are Jain texts, or that the authors of these texts that praise the Vedas, the Brahmins, Hindu gods and goddesses were Jains.

== End of the dynasty ==
It is unknown as to how the Kalabhras rule ended. However, a multitude of evidence affirms that Simhavishnu - the Pallava king and Pandya Kadungon had united the Tamil regions, removed Kalabhras and others. Simhavishnu consolidated his kingdom from south of the Krishna river and up to the Kaveri river by c. 575 CE. To the south of Kaveri, the Pandyas came to power. Cholas became subordinates of Pallavas and they were already ruling Telugu region of Rayalaseema. The Kalabhra rule which had dominated the political scene of the Tamil country for few centuries was defeated and ended by the Chalukyas, Pandyas, and Pallavas. This is attested by the numerous inscriptions dated from the 6th century and thereafter, as well as the Chinese language memoirs of the Buddhist pilgrim Xuanzang who visited the Tamil country about 640 CE along with other parts of South Asia. Xuanzang describes a peaceful cosmopolitan region where some 100 monasteries with 10,000 monks were studying Mahayana Buddhism, Kanchipuram was hosting learned debates with hundreds of heretic Deva (Hindu) temples but no Buddhist institutions. Xuangzang makes no mention of the Kalabhras.

== See also ==
- Kutruva Nayanar
- Karanthai
- Meykandar
