= Kaarkaathaar =

Hindu caste found in Indian state Tamil Nadu

- Religions: Hinduism
- Languages: Tamil
- Country: India
- Populated states: Tamil Nadu
- Region: Pandya nadu

Kaarkaathaar is a subcaste of the Vellalar Hindu caste in the Indian state of Tamil Nadu.

== Etymology ==
Kaarkaathaar, (kar 'rain', and kathar, 'protector' in Tamil), signifying 'The one who protected rain'. The earliest occurrence of the term Velaalar (வேளாளர்) in Sangam literature is in Paripadal where it is used in the sense of a landowner.

The term Velaalar (வேளாளர்) can be derived from the word Vel (வேள்), Vel being a title that was borne by the Velir chieftains of Sangam age, among other things.

The word Vellalar (வெள்ளாளர் ) may come from the root Vellam for flood, which gave rise to various rights of land; and it is because of the acquisition of land rights that the Vellalar got their name.

== History ==
In the years immediately following the Sangam age (from third to sixth century CE), the Tamil lands were ruled by a dynasty called Kalabhras. Scholar and historian M. Raghava Iyengar identifies the Kalabhras with the Kalappalar section of the Vellalar and equates king Achyuta Vikranta with Achyuta Kalappala the father of Meykandar who hailed from the Kaarukaathar community. Buddhadatta, the Pali writer who stayed in the Chola kingdom and authored Buddhist manuals refers (in the Nigamanagātha of Vinayavinicchaya, verse 3179) to his patron Achyuta Vikranta who was then (fifth century CE) ruling the Chola kingdom as Kalamba-kula nandane meaning the favourite of the Kalamba family. In Pali language as in Tamil, the word Kalamba or Kalambam (in Tamil) means the Kadamba tree, the sacred totemic symbol that is associated with Tamil god Murugan.

According to tradition, the Karkathar migrated from the Gangetic plains and over time spread over the entire macro region of present-day Tamil Nadu. According to satakams, the Pandya country was settled by these people after they had resided in the Chola country. According to historian Burton Stein, this theory is purely mythical.

Historian Usha R. Vijailakshmi observes that Verse 34 of the fake Karmandala Satakam written in the year 1936, connects the origin of the Gangas to the origin of the Karakatha Vellalas of southern Karnataka, as follows:

Gangeya Murthaka pala was born to Lord Shiva and he had two wives; the first wife had 54 sons & the second wife had 52 sons. Out of these Bhupalar, (one who practiced Agriculture) gave birth to 35 Vellala leaders, Dhanapalar, who was into trade, gave birth to 35 Vellala leaders Gopalar, (one who herded cattle) and one Agamurthi gave birth to 1 Vellala leader.

The names Bhupālar, Dhanapālar, and Gopālar refer to the three subdivisions of Vaishyas. They derive from word-elements associated with each occupational sub-group. For the agriculturists, bhu is used. This refers to the earth, as with the Hindu goddess who represents earth, Bhūmi, (Sanskrit: भूमि). For the merchants, dhana signifies wealth or material goods (Sanskrit: धन्य, dhánya, 'riches') and for the cattle-herders, the element go, signifying cow (Sanskrit: गो, 'cow, domestic bovine') is employed.

According to anthropologist Nicholas B. Dirks, the Pudukottai region was sparsely populated until the early Chola period. But with the beginning of the Chola era, there is strong evidence of increasing agrarian settlement, the growth of villages, institutions, the construction and expansion of temples. According to the Tekkattur manuscript, the Karkathar were initially divided into Kanāttars and Kōnāttars, each of which had many exogamous sub-divisions. Kōnādu or the land of the king (Chola country) mostly consisted of the regions north of the river Vellar except for the western part of the state where it included certain regions south of the river as well. Kanādu, literally meaning the land of the forests was included in the Pandya country. The manuscript goes on to describe the decline in the position of the Karkathar after the initial golden age due to the fighting between the two branches over various issues such as land, rights to the water of the river Vellar, temples etc. and the subsequent settlement and dominance of the Maravars in the region who were initially imported from Ramnad by both branches. The copper plate inscriptions held by every Maravar community in the region indicates that the Kōnāttu vellalar were victorious in the end.

== As founders of Saivite Mutts ==
Gnanasambandhar, the founder of the Saivite mutt Dharmapuram Adheenam that historically managed temples like the Thyagaraja temple at Thiruvarur hailed from this community.

== Caste-based Reservation Status ==
The Kaarkaatha Vellalar do not avail any benefits under the reservation quota for Backward castes.

== Distribution ==
Areas of Karkathar population have included:

- Thanjavur. Kumbakonam, Ariyalur, Thirupanandal, Nagapattinam, Thiruvarur, Mayavaram, Trichy, Chidambaram, Pudukottai, Cuddalore, Villupuram districts.
- Attur and Omalur taluks of Salem district.
- Southern districts such as Madurai, Theni, Dindigul, Ramanathapuram, Sivagangai, Virudhunagar, Thootukudi, Thirunelveli and Tenkasi.

== Notable people ==
- Meykanda Devar, the son of Achyuta Kalappaalar and the author of the Saivite scripture Sivagnana bodham hailed from this community.

== See also ==
- List of Vellalar sub castes
- List of Vellalars
- Velar (caste)
