= Thuluva Vellala =

Tamil agrarian caste

Thuluva Vellalar
- Religions: Hinduism, Christianity and Jainism
- Languages: Tamil
- Region: Tamil Nadu, Andhra Pradesh, Karnataka cities: Chennai, Bangalore, Vellore
- Feudal title: Mudaliar, Pillai, Goundar, Udayar, Chettiar, Nayakar
- Related groups: Tamil people

Thuluva Vellalar, (Note: Susan Bayly has noted of the Vellalar communities generally that "they were never a tightly-knit community ... In the eighteenth and early nineteenth centuries, Vellala affiliation was as vague and uncertain as that of most other south Indian caste groups. Vellala identity was certainly thought of as a source of prestige, but for that very reason there were any number of groups who sought to claim Vellala status for themselves.") also known as Agamudi Mudaliar or Arcot Mudaliars, is a caste found in northern Tamil Nadu, southern Andhra Pradesh and southern Karnataka. They were an elite and dominant land-owning community.

== Etymology ==
The earliest occurrence of the term Velaalar (வேளாளர்) in Sangam literature is found in Paripadal, where it is used in the sense of a landowner. The word Vellalar (வெள்ளாளர்) may originate from the root Vellam for flood, denoting their ability to control and store water for irrigation purposes. which led to the development of various land rights, ultimately giving the Vellalar their name. The term Velaalar (வேளாளர்) is also derived from the word Vel (வேள்), a title used by Velir chieftains during the Sangam age.

Since they migrated from the Tulu region of ancient Tamizhagam, they are called Thuluva Vellalar.

== History ==
Thuluva Vellalars are part of larger Vellalar community. An early Tamil tradition states that a king known as Ādonda Chakravarthi brought a large number of agriculturists (now known as the Tuluva Vellalas) from the Tulu areas in order to reclaim forest lands for cultivation in Thondaimandalam. Scholar M. Arokiaswami identifies Tondaiman Ilandiraiyan with king Adondai Chakravarthi, the legendary figure who is referred to in the Mackenzie Manuscripts.

Sometimes this migration of Thuluva Vellalas is also assigned to later Chola times when Hoysala Ballalas of Karnataka had occupied portions of Kanchipuram and Trichy.

== Demographics ==
Their original stronghold in present-day Tamil Nadu was Thiruvannamalai in North Arcot district, the town that served as the capital of the Hoysala king Veera Ballala III in the 14th century.

Tuluva Vellalars are progressive and prosperous in the society. They are considerably advanced in the matter of education and the community was eagerly involved in business, Government and Non- governmental institutions.

The community commonly use Mudaliar and Udayar titles. However Naicker, Gounder, Reddy and Pillai titles are also present in some pockets.

== Caste-based reservation status ==
In Tamil Nadu

Arcot Mudaliar and Arcot Vellala sects: Classified as Forward Class.

Other sects of Thuluva Vellala: Classified under the Other Backward Class (OBC) category at both the Central and State levels.

In Andhra Pradesh

Thuluva Vellala, Agamudi Mudaliar, and Aghamudi Vellala: Recognized under the Backward Class (D) category under the umbrella term 'Mudhaliar'.

== Current status ==
The Thuluva Vellalar community, also referred to as Thuluva Vellala Mudaliars, was historically classified as a Forward Caste (FC) in Tamil Nadu. However, over time, they were reclassified as a Backward Class (BC).

while the Arcot Vellalar are continues to retain its Forward Caste (FC) status and do not avail any benefits under the reservation quota for Backward castes.

== Classification history ==
The administrative classification of Thuluva Vellalars has evolved through successive Backward Classes commissions in Tamil Nadu, reflecting ongoing debates about their relationship to the Agamudayar community.

=== Early commissions (1969-1985) ===
The First Backward Classes Commission (1969-70), chaired by A.N. Sattanathan, encountered contradictory evidence regarding the communities' relationship. While the Madras District Collector asserted they were distinct castes, Chengalpattu officials maintained they represented the same community. Despite this unresolved question, the government's 1972 order grouped them together under the entry "Agamudayar including Thuluva Vellala."

The Second Backward Classes Commission (1982-85), led by J.A. Ambasankar, later documented that the combined population of Agamudayars and Thuluva Vellalars constituted 3.48% of Tamil Nadu's population (1,741,852 individuals) in the early 1980s. The commission noted both communities were among nine groups that had disproportionately benefited from reservation policies, having "cornered the lion's share" of reserved positions.

=== Contemporary resolution (2023-2024) ===
The Justice Janarthanan Commission (2023) re-examined this classification, concluding that creating separate entries would not require new data or affect existing benefits, but would address longstanding grievances about misclassification. This recommendation led to the June 2024 government order establishing distinct entries for both communities in the Backward Classes list.

The commission emphasized this change represented an administrative correction rather than a new classification, noting that district-level records had consistently documented separate identities for the communities.

== Notable people ==
- Vallal Pachayappa Mudaliar- a famous Dubashe of Madras and the founder of Pachayappa Educational Trust.
- V. L. Ethiraj, Barrister and philanthropist who founded Ethiraj College for Women.
- Sir Dr. C. Natesa Mudaliar, one of the founders of the Justice Party, politician, activist and philanthropist.
- Ariyanatha Mudaliar- Delavoy (General) and the Chief Minister of the greatest of the Nayaka domains established by the Vijayanagar viceroy and later ruler of Madurai, Viswanatha Nayak (1529–64).
- Diwan Bahadur Sir Arcot Ramasamy Mudaliar, KCSI - Founder Chairman of UNESCO and the Diwan of Mysore.
- Sir Arcot Lakshmanaswami Mudaliar, Vice-president of the Eighth World Health Assembly in 1955 and President of the Fourteenth World Health Assembly in 1961.
- P U Shanmugam - Former Tamil Nadu minister of Public Works Department.
- V. M. Muralidharan- The Chairman of Ethiraj College for Women.
- Dr. M. R. Gurusamy Mudaliar- An Indian medical practitioner.
- Dr. B. M. Sundaravadanan- Chairman of Tamil Nadu Medical Council.
- Arcot Narrainswamy Mudaliar- philanthropist, He Founded the R.B.A.N.M.'s Educational Charities and R.B.A.N.M.'s Chattram and other charities.
- Sir S. Muthiah Mudaliar- Indian politician and legislator of the Justice Party.

== See also ==
- list of Vellalars
- list of vellalar sub castes
- Sangama dynasty
- Arunachalesvara Temple
