= B. M. Sundaravadanan =

Indian Medical doctor

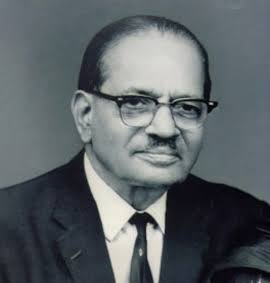

Founder and Vice Chair of Association of Surgeons of India
- In office 1938

Founder and President of The Kilpauk Benefit Saswatha Nithi Limited
- In office 1938–1991

Chairman of Tamil Nadu Medical Council
- In office 1970–1976

Personal details
- Born: Bangalore Madavaraya Mudaliar Sundaravadanan; 5 December 1900 North Arcot District, Madras Presidency
- Died: December 28, 1995 Chennai, India
- Spouse: Lakshmibai Sundaravadanan
- Education: Madras Medical College, Chennai
- Occupation: Surgeon

B. M. Sundaravadanan was an Indian surgeon, educationalist and a philanthropist from Madras. He was an alumnus of the Madras Medical College and the First Honorary surgeon of Madras Medical College. He also served as the chairman of the Tamil Nadu Medical Council.

Sundaravadanan was one of the first medical practitioners to start their hospital in EVR Periyar Salai, which is now regarded as the "Med street" of Chennai.

Sundaravadanan was born in a Thuluva Vellala Mudaliar family of Madras. MM road (Madhavaraya Mudaliar Road) in Frazer town of Bangalore City is named after his father Madhavaraya Mudaliar. He was also the President of Tuluva Vellala Association and associated educational institutions. Sundaravadanan was also the founder of Dr. B. M. Sundaravadanan Trust schools at Shenoy Nagar, Chennai.

Sundaravadanan, along with Dr Arcot Lakshmanaswami Mudaliar, was one of the founders of Association of Surgeons of India (ASI). The Association of Surgeons of India has named the Best Teacher Award after Sundaravadanan. Sivapatham Vittal was one of the recipients of Dr. B. M. Sundaravadanan Best Teacher Award. Sundaravadanan was also the founder president of The Kilpauk Benefit Saswatha Nithi Limited.
