= Chozhia Vellalar =

Caste from Southern India

Chozhia Vellalar / Sozhia Vellalar
- Religions: Hinduism (majority), Christianity
- Languages: Tamil
- Region: Tanjore (Chola Nadu) in current-day Tamil Nadu and Puducherry
- Feudal title: Pillai, Chettiar
- Related groups: Vellalar, Indian Tamils

Chozhia Vellalar (also spelt as Sozhia, Choliya or Sholiya Vellalar) is a caste or a subcaste of Southern India, related to the Vellalar community.

They traditionally used Pillai as a title or surname, up to the political hegemony of Dravidianism in the state of Tamil Nadu, where they essentially come from.

== Distribution ==
The Sozhiya Vellalars were present predominantly in the Cauvery delta districts of Tamil Nadu — Thanjavur, Mayuram, Nagappattinam and Thiruvarur — as well in a lesser extent in the neighbouring Trichy, Karur and Namakkal.

== History ==
Their name, Sozhiya or Chozhia, reflects this geographical particularity, as a population concentrated in the heart of the ancient Chola kingdom or Chola Nadu, which corresponds to the Tanjore region. They are among the few communities to hold this title, along with notably the Chozhia Chettiars and Chozhia Iyers. The title of these communities is more indicative of their very ancient ties with the Tanjore region, rather than proof of direct kinship with the Chola dynasty. They have historically formed a large population in this area.

In the work named Castes and Tribes of Southern India, published in 1909, colonial anthropologist Edgar Thurston notes that the most eminent pandaram, thambiran and oduvar – who significantly make up the ecclesiastical body or administrative and managerial bodies of Shaivite monasteries (adheenam) and temples – are notably drawn from the Chozhia Vellalar community. He also makes the paradoxical observation that in his times, the Chozhia Vellalars are also sometimes perceived as being of dubious ancestry or legitimacy, as it is also to their community that some parvenu individuals seeking to improve their social status try to affiliate themselves.

In their studies of the social setting in rural southeastern India (especially Tanjore) in the second half of the twentieth century, anthropologists Kathleen Gough and André Béteille report that the general social perception of the Chozhia Vellalars was that of an upper caste. Although, depending on the locality, they were not a dominant caste. The socio-economic conditions of the community were diverse, although there was a predominance of people engaged in agriculture, with both landowners and tenant farmers.

== Present status ==
Before 1975 in the state of Tamil Nadu they were classified as Forward caste, but due to their economical situation, as well as caste-based regional politics, they were reclassified as Other Backward Class under India's Reservation system. Until 2015, they were still classified as Forward caste in the Union Territory of Pondicherry.

== See also ==
- List of Vellalar sub castes
- List of Vellalars
