= K. A. P. Viswanatham =

Indian politician

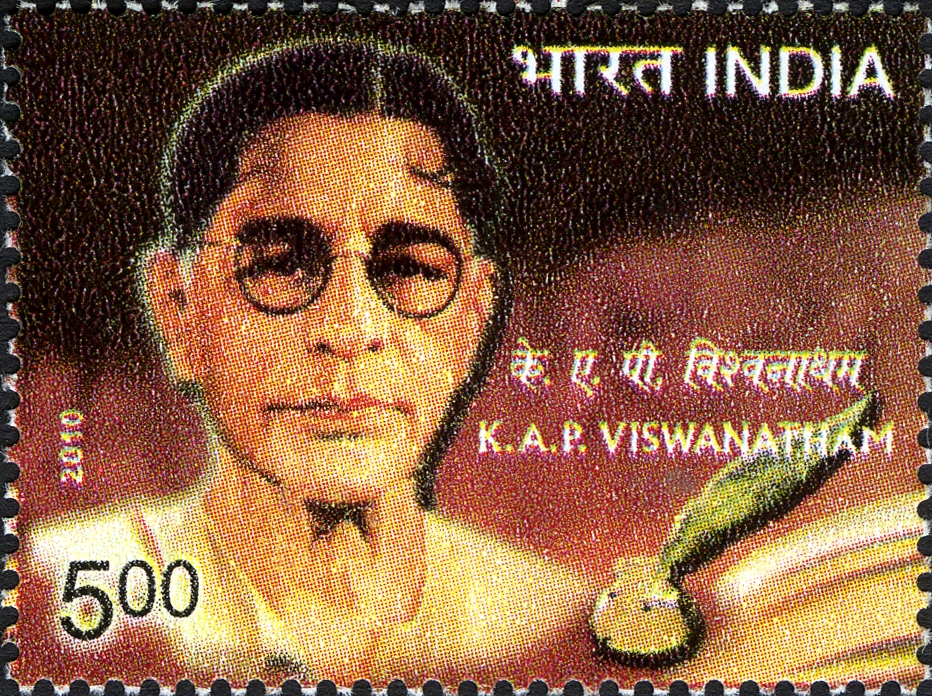
- Viswnatham on a 2010 stamp of India
- Born: 10 November 1899; Trichinopoly, Madras Presidency, British India
- Died: 19 December 1994 (aged 95)
- Occupations: Writer, activist, orator

K. A. Periyanna Viswanatham Pillai (10 November 1899 – 19 December 1994) was a Tamil scholar, orator and social activist. Despite having no formal education he developed an interest towards the Tamil literature and Siddha medicine and learned them by himself. His father Periyanna and his elder brother Krishnan and Arumugam living as a joint family. They ran a joint venture business (tobacco) with the name of K.A.P. That precedes Viswanathan as K.A.P Viswanathan. He also took part in politics and was an active member of Justice Party. He became the first General Secretary of the party, a position which he continued to hold till 1940 after which C. N. Annadurai took over. He also took part in the Anti-Hindi agitation of 1937–40 and was imprisoned. Viswanatham was also instrumental in launching the Tamil University at Thanjavur.

== Biography ==
K. A. P. Viswanatham was born in 1899 in Tiruchirappalli, Madras Presidency, British India to Periyanna Pillai and Subbammal of Chozhia Vellalar community. As a child, he did not attend any school but developed an interest towards Tamil literature. At the age of five, he began learning the language and would go on to become an established scholar. He was also passionate about Siddha medicine. He entered politics and joined the Justice Party and was made the General secretary, a position he would serve till 1940. He resigned as the secretary due to the differences of opinion that he had with the party leader Periyar E. V. Ramasamy, after which C. N. Annadurai succeeded him. Viswanatham died on 19 December 1994 at the age of 95.

== Legacy ==
- During his lifetime, Viswanatham was awarded with two doctorates.
- Higher secondary school established on his memory in Tiruchirappalli, his hometown
- K.A.P. Viswanatham Government Medical College is named after him.
- A postage stamp was issued under Viswanatham's name on 10 October 2010 by the Government of India.

== Cited sources ==
- Kaṇēcan, Pi. Ci (2003). C.N. Annadurai. Publications Division, Ministry of Information and Broadcasting, Government of India. ISBN 978-81-230-1101-1.
- Kannan, R. (2010). Anna: The Life and Times of C.N. Annadurai. Penguin Books India. ISBN 978-0-670-08328-2.
- Vēṅkaṭācalapati, Ā. Irā (2006). In Those Days There was No Coffee: Writings in Cultural History. Yoda Press. ISBN 978-81-902272-7-8.
