= Muthuranga Mudaliar =

Muthuranga Mudaliar was a well known freedom-fighter from Nasarath pettai near Poonamallee in Thiruvallur District.He was born into a Vellalar family. He participated in the Quit India Movement in 1942 along with Prakasam, V. V. Giri, M. Bhakthavatsalam, K. Kamaraj and other freedom fighters
