= Pachaiyappa Mudaliar =

Philanthropist

Vallal Pachayappa Mudaliar
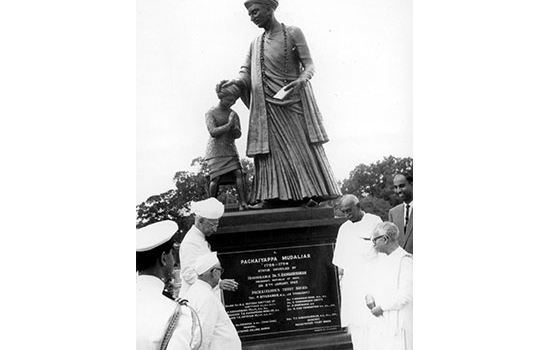
- Born: Pachayappa Mudaliyar; Periyapalayam, North Arcot district, British India
- Occupations: Philanthropist, merchant, dubash
- Parent: Viswanathan Mudaliar

Vallal Pachaiyappa Mudaliar (1754–1794) or Arcot Pachayyappa Mudaliar was a Madras merchant, philanthropist, and dubash of the 18th century.

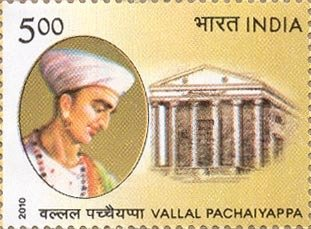
2010 Indian Stamp

Commemorative stamp on Vallal Pachaiyappa was released 31 March 2010.

== Early life ==
Vallal Pachaiyappa Mudaliar was born to Visvanatha Mudaliar of the Thuluva Vellalar agricultural subsect of Vellalar community in Periyapalaiyam in Thiruvallur district. Invited to Madras by dubash Narayana Pillai, he became a dubash at the age of 16 and amassed a fortune by the time he was 21. Ramanuja Kavirayar had written Pancharatnamala on Pachaiyappa Mudaliar.

== As dubash ==
A protégé of Narayana Pillai, Vallal Pachaiyappa Mudaliar rose to dubash-ship soon after the demise of his mentor. During the same time, his employers, the Powney family, comprising the brothers Henry Powney and Thomas Powney, rose to the Mayorship of Madras. This increased the stature of Vallal Pachaiyappa Mudaliar, and he emerged as one of the richest and most powerful men in Madras city.

== Lifestyle ==
Despite being one of the richest men in the city, Pachaiyappa Mudaliar led a simple and austere lifestyle. He built a house at No. 26, Pagoda Street, in the year 1790, where he lived until his death. His life has been the subject of a detailed biography by one of his contemporaries. Witnesses recall that Pachaiyappa Mudaliar would bathe in the Coovum every day along with his affluent neighbours before worshipping at the temple at Komaleeswaranpet. He was a frequent worshipper in Kanchipuram Ekambaranatha Temple, and contributed for Temple renovation at his own expense. His statue could be seen in Kanchi Ekambareswarar temple's pillar. A similar Ekambareswarar temple was built in Parry's corner (Old: George Town), Chennai to reduce the travel time to Kanchi. He divided his time between Chennai and Thanjavur and used to travel to his village, Periyapalayam (Today: Tiruvallur district) regularly. During the journey, he used to stop for days at Chidambaram to pray at the famous Hindu temple.

== Death ==
Pachaiyappa Mudaliar's health deteriorated rapidly and one such visit to Thanjavur in 1794 he fell ill at Kumbakonam and died at Tiruvaiyaru on 31 March 1794.

== Will ==
Pachaiyappa Mudaliar was one of the first Indians to leave a will. He had set aside Rs. 450,000 of what he had left to be spent on Hindu religious institutions and the remaining Rs. 700,000 on providing an English education to Hindu youth. ("At the time of his death his fortune was estimated at five lakhs of pagodas or 1.7 million rupees" Reference: The Dubashes of Madras by Susan Neild-Basu (1984)). The bequests, however, remained contested even after that and it was 1909 before the courts appointed a board of trustees and formulated a scheme for the smooth running of the trust. As the 1990s dawned, it was reported that the Trust was worth over 45 billion, one of the biggest in that part of the world. Apart from administering religious charities from Kanyakumari to Varanasi, it ran six colleges, a polytechnic and 16 schools in Tamil Nadu, helped several medical facilities and owned several properties in the State.

The Pachaiyappa's College is one institution for which Pachaiyappa Mudaliar became well known. This college was established as Pachaiyappa's Central Institution at Popham's Broadway on 1 January 1842 from the funds, Pachaiyappa Mudaliar had allocated to charities as per the contents of his will. In 1856, the institution shifted to its own premises at China Bazaar. It became a school in 1850 and a college in 1889. The Pachaiyappa's Central Institution is the first non-missionary, non-British-financed education institution in South India.
