= Arcot Ramachandran =

Indian scientist (1923–2018)

- Born: 6 April 1923; Madras, Tamil Nadu, India
- Died: 18 May 2018 (aged 95)
- Occupation: Scientist
- Awards: Padma Bhushan; Sir M. Visvesvaraya Life Time Achievement Award; INAE Life Time Achievement Award; World Federation of Engineering Organizations Award; Shanti Swaroop Bhatnagar Gold Medal; World Habitat Trophy; Heat Transfer Memorial Award

Arcot Ramachandran (1923-2018) was an Indian scientist, anthropologist, author and a former under-secretary general of United Nations Centre for Human Settlements, known for his scholarship on the subjects of heat and mass transfer and environment and his social commitment to the cause of sustainable development. The Government of India honoured him in 2003, with the Padma Bhushan, the third highest civilian award, for his services to the fields of science and engineering.

== Life sketch ==
Born in a Tamil-speaking Arcot Mudaliar family in the Indian state of Karnataka,

Arcot Ramachandran graduated from the Madras University and went to the Purdue University, USA, from where he obtained MS degree in engineering. He continued at the university for his doctoral research and obtained his PhD.

Ramachandran started his career as a faculty member of the Department of Power Engineering at the Indian Institute of Science, Bangalore, in 1950, and, later, rose to the rank of an assistant professor. In 1954, he took a break from the teaching career to work as a researchefngineer at Babcock & Wilcox Research and Development Centre, Renfrew, Scotland where he worked for a year. The next year, in 1955, he again went to the US to continue his studies at the post-doctoral level, as post-doctoral research fellow, to Purdue University and, later, at Columbia University.

Ramachandran came back to India, in 1957, did a summer course at Indian Institute of Technology, Madras. Subsequent to that, IISc invited him to head the Department of Mechanical Engineering. In 1965, he was transferred as the head of the Department of Industrial Management and, two years later, in 1967, he became the director of IIT Madras.

In 1973, the Government of India established a new Department of Science and Technology and nominated Ramachandran as the government secretary and the director-general of the Council of Scientific and Industrial Research, in charge of the newly formed department. During his tenure there, he is reported to be able to start several ventures and programs such as:

- Science and Technology Agency
- Environment Planning, Co-ordination and Research Programme
- Science and Engineering Research Council
- Energy Sources Research and Development Programme
- National Information System for Science and technology (NISSAT)
- Central Electronics Limited

In 1977, Ramachandran was made the chairman of the Preparatory Committee for the United Nations Conference on Science and Technology for Development. He was also involved with the UNESCO Expert Group Meeting on Engineering Education, in the capacity of its chairman. U.N. ESCAP Regional Centre for Transfer of Technology Bangalore, started on 16 July 1977, owes its origin to the recommendations of this Expert Group. The next year, he was selected as the Under Secretary-General and Executive Director of the United Nations Centre for Human Settlements (Habitat), headquartered in Nairobi. He also had the additional charge of the Administrator of the United Nations Habitat and Human Settlements Foundation. In 1993, Dr. Ramachandran retired from the UN.

Ramachandran has participated, as the chairman or as a member, in various advisory and consultative committees under the Ministry of Non-conventional Energy Sources, the Ministry of Urban Affairs and the Department of Ocean Development.

== Legacy ==
Arcot Ramachandran has made many contributions, both social and educational, during his academic and administrative careers. During his tenure as the Under Secretary General at the UN Centre for Human Settlements, he proposed the introduction of World Habitat Day, which was accepted, leading to observing the first Monday of every October as a special day to remind the world of sustainable progress with regard to environment. He was also instrumental in the proclamation of the year 1987 as the International Year of Shelter for the Homeless, as a part of the Global Strategy for Shelter for the year 1987. It was during his tenure, UN launched the Sustainable Cities Programme in 12 cities, in 1990.

On the academic front, Ramachandran is the founder of a School of Research in Heat and Mass Transfer. He is reported to be successful in launching several programs in Mechanical Engineering, during his stint at the Indian Institute of Science, Bangalore. Indian Institute of Technology, Madras, under his Directorship, is reported to have gained reputation as a Centre of Excellence. During this period, he founded the Indian Society of Heat and Mass Transfer of which he was the first President. He also opened the School of Heat Transfer and the School of Energy Research, under the umbrella of IIT Madras. He is also credited with organising the Regional Centre for Energy, Heat and Mass Transfer for Asia-Pacific.

While he was the Government Secretary, Ramachandran implemented the first Science and Technology Plan, suggested by NCST. His efforts were also reported to be behind the establishment of National Remote Sensing Agency, in Hyderabad. He is also regarded as the architect of the National Program for Research and Development in Renewable Sources of Energy.

Arcot Ramchandran has also contributed to dissemination of information by way of conducting many seminars and by way of keynote addresses and lectures, delivered at various platforms and seminars, a few of which are:

- Keynote address on Sustainable communities through partnership at the meeting of the Commonwealth Heads of Governments at Edinburgh, Scotland in October 1997
- Keynote address on Science and Technology for Sustainable Development at the Maharashtra Association for the cultivation of Science, Pune in 1998
- Keynote Address on 'Metropolitan Concentrations of knowledge based industries at the International Conference, Ottawa, Canada, in September 1997

== Positions ==
- Under Secretary General, United Nations Centre for Human Settlements (HABITAT)
- Chairman – Preparatory Committee of UN Conference on Science and Technology
- Government Secretary – Department of Science and Technology – Government of India
- Chairman – The Energy and Resources Institute (TERI) – Southern Regional Centre
- board member – Intercultural Cooperation Foundation (ICF) India
- board member – Public Affairs Centre, Bangalore
- Chairman, International Jury – UNCHS (Habitat) and the United Arab Emirates
- President – Solar Energy Society of India
- President – National Institute of Urban Affairs, New Delhi
- Chairman – Governing Council – Tata Energy Research Institute, New Delhi
- Chairman – Science and Technology Advisory Committee for SSS-Nire, M.N.E.S., Government of India
- Hon. Visiting Professor – National Institute of Advanced Studies, Bangalore
- Chairman – Engineering Staff College of India, Hyderabad
- Member – American Society of Engineering Education
- Member – UK Journal of Heat and Mass Transfer
- Member – National Council of Science Education

== Awards and recognitions ==
- Padma Bhushan – Government of India – 2003
- Sir M. Visvesvaraya Life Time Achievement Award in Engineering – 1999
- Indian National Academy of Engineering Life Time Achievement Award – 1999
- World Federation of Engineering Organizations Award – 2005
- Shanti Swaroop Bhatnagar Gold Medal – 1998
- World Habitat Trophy – Building and Social Housing Foundation of UK – 1995
- Heat Transfer Memorial Award – American Society of Mechanical Engineers – 1986

== Honorary degrees and fellowships ==
Arcot Ramachandran has been honoured by several prominent educational and research institutions, by way of Fellowships and Honoris Causa Doctoral degrees.

Honorary doctorates

- Purdue University, USA
- Stuttgart University, Germany
- University of Roorkee, India
- Andhra University, India
- Jawarharlal Nehru Technological University, India
- Anna University, India
- Indian Institute of Technology Madras, India
- University of Venice, Italy

Fellowships

- Life Fellow – Institution of Engineers
- Fellow of the Indian Institute of Science
- Fellow – American Society of Mechanical Engineers
- Fellow – American Society of Engineering Education
- Fellow – Institution of Mechanical Engineers
- Fellow – Indian National Science Academy
- Fellow – Indian Academy of Sciences
- Fellow – Indian National Academy of Engineering

== Writings ==
- Arcot Ramachandran (1992). Earth construction technology. United Nations. ASIN B0011OYQWW.
- Chris Flavin; Mia Birk; Angela Bischoff; Arcot Ramachandran (1992). Sustainable Transportation: Strategies and Development. Brazil: United Nations. p. 274. ASIN B001ATJGCS.
- Arcot Ramachandran (1974). Energy research and development in India: Challenges and perspectives. Andhra Pradesh Akademi of Sciences. p. 32. ASIN B0006CNOPA.
- Arcot Ramachandran (1979). Human settlements and the new international development strategy. United Nations Centre for Human Settlements. p. 12. ASIN B0007BMP0A.
- Arcot Ramachandran (1980). Human settlements in the development process. Eastern Regional Organization for Planning and Housing. p. 26. ASIN B0007AUMMY.
- Arcot Ramachandran; Vinod K Tewari; M Ramaiah (2003). The urban challenge : a collection of lectures delivered by Dr. Arcot Ramachandran, formerly Under Secretary General and Executive Director, UN Habitat, Nairobi. Bangalore: Focus Communications. p. 405. OCLC 81659456.
- Arcot Ramachandran; Paul-Walter Bouda (1984). Problems of urbanization in Africa : the role of secondary cities in economic and social development. Dakar, Senegal: Institute for Development Anthropology document. p. 7. OCLC 226969085.

== See also ==
- United Nations Human Settlements Programme
- Indian Institute of Technology Madras
