= Sivapatham Vittal =

Indian surgical endocrinologist (1941–2024)

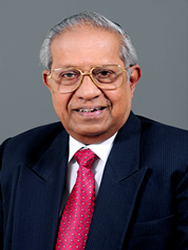
- Born: 30 August 1941; Madras, Madras Province, British India
- Died: 26 November 2024 (aged 83)
- Education: Madras Medical College
- Occupation: Surgical endocrinologist
- Awards: Padma Shri; Dr. B. C. Roy Award; Tamil Nadu Scientist Award; Dr B M Sundaravadanam Best Teacher Award; Royal College of Surgeons of Edinburgh Gold Medal; Teachers' Teacher Award; MMC Lifetime Achievement Award; Human Excellence Award

Sivapatham Vittal (30 August 1941 – 26 November 2024) was an Indian surgical endocrinologist, considered by many as the Father of Surgical Endocrinology in India. The Government of India honored Vittal in 2011, with the fourth highest civilian award of Padma Shri.

== Early life and education ==
Sivapatham Vittal was born in Madras, Madras Province, British India on 30 August 1941. He graduated in medicine from Madras Medical College from where he also obtained his post graduate degree.

== Career ==
Joining his alma mater as a faculty member, Vittal is reported to have been instrumental in establishing the Department of Endocrinology at Madras Medical College in 1987, known to be the first such department in India and was its first head of the department, a post he held till 1999.

Vittal, the founder president of the Indian Association of Endocrine Surgeons, was a president of the Association of Surgeons of India and the International College of Surgeons, India chapter. He served as the surgical tutor at the Royal College of Surgeons of Edinburgh and held the chair of its India chapter. He was also a member of the British Association of Endocrine and Thyroid Surgeons and the International Medical Sciences Academy. He is credited with a book and articles on Endocrinology and was a member of the editorial boards of journals such as Indian Journal of Surgery, Thyroid Surgery, International Surgery. He also delivered key note addresses at several conferences and seminars and served as the visiting professor at many universities.

An emeritus professor of the Tamil Nadu Dr. M.G.R. Medical University, Sivapatham Vittal, post his retirement from Madras Medical College, is associated with the Apollo Hospitals, Chennai as an endocrine surgeon. He was also one of the founders of Sree Sai Krishna Hospital, Chennai. He was a Fellow of the Royal College of Surgeons of Edinburgh, and the International College of Surgeons, the International Medical Sciences Academy.

He was a member of the board of trustees of the Ethiraj College for Women, Chennai.

Vittal died on 26 November 2024, at the age of 83.

== Awards and recognitions ==
Sivapatham Vittal was a recipient of the 1995 Dr. B. C. Roy Award, the highest Indian award in the medical category. Two years later, the Royal College of Surgeons of Edinburgh honored him with the Silver Medallion and the next year, in 1998, the Government of Tamil Nadu awarded him the Tamil Nadu Scientist Award. In 2001, he received the Human Excellence Award from the Vivekananda Institute of Human Excellence.

The Association of Surgeons of India conferred Dr B M Sundaravadanam Best Teacher Award on Vittal in 2005, and the same year he received the Overseas Gold medal from the Royal College of Surgeons of Edinburgh. The Teachers' Teacher Award reached him in 2007 and Madras Medical College awarded the Lifetime Achievement Award from Madras Medical College in 2010. The next year, the Government of India included Vittal in the Republic day honours list for the award of Padma Shri.
