= Nankudi Vellalar =

Subcates of Vellalar in Tamil Nadu

Nankudi Vellalar/ Sivagalai Pillaimar
Yajamanar, Mudhalali, Nachiyar

Regions with significant populations
- Tamil Nadu: Thoothukudi, Tirunelveli, Ambasamudram, Korkai, Srivaikuntam

Languages
- Tamil

Religion
- Shaivism

Related ethnic groups
- Tamil people

Nankudi Vellalar, also known as Nangudi Vellalar or Sivakalai Pillaimar, is a sub-caste of Vellalar caste in Tamil Nadu, India. This group of people are considered to be believers and followers of Shaivism, a religion that preaches Shiva, a major deity in Hinduism, as the Supreme God. They also claim descent from the Velir hereditary of Irungovel Pandyas The hereditary headman of the caste was always invested with the title Irungovel. Their origination is from Melaselvanur in the Ramanathapuram District. As they immigrated to Sivagalai, they were highly involved in agriculture activities. Their original stronghold seems to have been southern districts of Tamil Nadu, viz. Thoothukudi, Tirunelveli, Korkai, Ambasamudram, etc. Some of them migrated to Srivaikuntam during the course of time and came to be known as Kottai Vellalar, or "Kottai Pillaimar,” as they built and lived in forts.

H.R. Pate (b. 1917), the former district collector of Tirunelveli, describes them as great rulers, administrators, agriculturists, merchants, and traders, and as a remarkably prosperous and energetic community.

== Etymology ==
Nankudi Vellalar is derived from the words Nar(good), Kudi (community) and Vellalar (farmers), so they were essentially a good community of farmers.

== Caste structure ==
The caste is made of a number of matrilineal exogamous clans called Kilais or branches descending from the female line.

== Caste-based Reservation Status ==
The Nankudi Vellalar do not avail any benefits under the reservation quota for Backward castes.
