= Secondary Education Commission =

Indian government commission of the 1950s

The Government of India established the Secondary Education Commission on 23 September 1952 under the chairmanship of Dr. Lakshmanaswamy Mudaliar. It was called the Mudaliar Commission after him. The commission recommended diversifying the curriculum, adding an intermediate level, introducing three-tier undergraduate courses, etc.

== Introduction ==
In order to review the position of secondary education in India and to suggest measures for its overall improvement, Government of India appointed Secondary Education Commission on September 23, 1952. Dr. A. Laxmanswamy Mudaliar, Vice-Chancellor of the University of Madras, was the chairman of the committee, and hence it came to known by the name Mudaliar Commission. The Central Advisory Board of Education suggested to the Government of India that there was a need for complete formation of secondary education. This commission is also called Mudaliar Education Commission after the name of

== Policy for the Spread of Secondary Education ==
- Secondary education should be made vocational so that 30% of the students at the lower secondary level and 50% of the students at the higher secondary level can get vocational education
- Equality of opportunities in secondary education should be emphasized, for this, arrangements should be made to provide more and more scholarships at this level.
- Special programs should be organized for the expansion of secondary education among girls, scheduled castes and tribes.
- Genuine efforts should be made for the development of talent
- Plans should be made for the expansion of secondary education in each district and they should be fully implemented within a period of 10 years.
- All the new schools should complete the required education program and the standard of the existing schools should be made high.
