= Vellalar =

Indian caste

- Religions: Hinduism, Jainism, Christianity
- Languages: Tamil
- Subdivisions: Mudaliar ‡ — Thondai Nadu; Gounder ‡ — Kongu Nadu; Pillai ‡ — Chola Nadu, Pandya Nadu; Sri Lankan Vellalar ‡ — Yazhpana Kudanaadu, Vanni Nadu
- Related groups: Tamil people

Vellalar is a group of castes in the Indian states of Tamil Nadu and Kerala, and northeastern parts of Sri Lanka. (Note: According to Susan Bayly, even in the eighteenth and early nineteenth centuries, "Vellalar affiliation was as vague and uncertain as that of most other south Indian castes"; Vellalar identity was a source of prestige and "There were any number of groups sought to claim Vellalar status for themselves") (Note: The term "Vellalar" is a generic term for a group of high ranking Non-brahmin castes in TamilNadu) (Note: Coming to the Vellalas, Andre Beteille, an authority on caste in South India writes: The term 'Vellala' is rather confusing because of its comprehensive use. Even the Vellalas proper, those who are of Vellala origin-are not a homogeneous unit but are subdivided into small sections. These sub-groups are always segmented and are endogamous.) The Vellalar are members of several endogamous (Note: Without going into detail, it must suffice to say that in Sripuram the Vellalas proper are segmented into three endogamous units: Chozhia Vellala, Karaikathu Vellala, and Kodikkal Vellala.) (Note: The Kongu Vellalar is an engogamous group. They use 'gounder' as a title and hence they are also known as Kongu Vellala Gounders.) castes such as the numerically strong Arunattu Vellalar, Chozhia Vellalar, Karkarthar Vellalar, Kongu Vellalar, Thuluva Vellalar and Sri Lankan Vellalar.

== Etymology ==
The earliest occurrence of the term Velaalar (வேளாளர்) in Sangam literature is in Paripadal where it is used in the sense of a landowner. The term Velaalar (வேளாளர்) can be derived from the word Vel (வேள்), Vel being a title that was borne by the Velir chieftains of Sangam age among other things.

The word Vellalar (வெள்ளாளர்) may come from the root Vellam for flood, which gave rise to various rights of land; and it is because of the acquisition of land rights that the Vellalar got their name.

== History ==
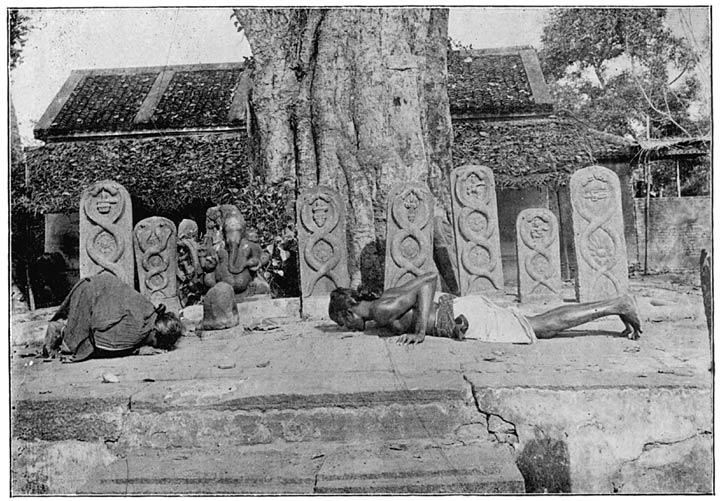
Vellālars worshipping lingam, snake-stones and Ganēsa from Castes and Tribes of Southern India (1909).

The Vellalars have a long cultural history that goes back to over two millennia in southern India, where once they were the ruling and land-owning community. Though the Vellalar have generally been associated with the landed gentry and agriculture, they are not a homogenous group and various people from diverse backgrounds have identified themselves as a Vellalar in the course of history.

=== In Sangam literature ===
The Vellalar are spoken of as a group of people right from the Sangam period and are mentioned in many of the classical works of Sangam literature. The Tolkappiyam does not contain the term Vellalar but refers to a group of people called Velaan Maanthar who apart from practising agriculture had the right to carry weapons and wear garlands when they were involved in affairs of the state. The term Vellalar itself occurs in the sense of a landowner in Paripadal. The poem Pattinappaalai lists the six virtues of Vellalar as abstention from killing, abstention from stealing, propagation of religion, hospitality, justice and honesty.

=== Post-Sangam period ===
In the years that immediately followed the Sangam age (from third to sixth century CE), the Tamil lands were ruled by a dynasty called Kalabhras. Historians believe that the Kalabhras belonged to the Vellalar community of warriors who were possibly once the feudatories of the Cholas and the Pallavas. Scholar and historian M. Raghava Iyengar identifies the Kalabhras with the Kalappalar section of the Vellalar and equates king Achyuta Vikranta with Achyuta Kalappala the father of Meykandar. Buddhadatta, the Pali writer who stayed in the Chola kingdom and authored Buddhist manuals refers (in the Nigamanagātha of Vinayavinicchaya, verse 3179) to his patron Achyuta Vikranta who was then (fifth century CE) ruling the Chola kingdom as Kalamba-kula nandane meaning the favourite of the Kalamba family. In Pali language as in Tamil, the word Kalamba or Kalambam (in Tamil) means the Kadamba tree, the sacred totemic symbol that is associated with Tamil god Murugan.

=== The Velir ===
The Velir were an ancient group of Tamil chieftains who claimed Yadava (Yadu) descent. The Ay Vels were one such Velir group that ruled the territory in and around Venad during the Sangam period. The word Venad is derived from Vel -nadu, that is the country ruled by Vel chieftains. We know of a queen of Vikramaditya Varaguna, an Ay king of 9th century who is referred to as Murugan Chenthi and as Aykula Mahadevi from inscriptions. Her father, an Ay chief called Chathan Murugan is described as a Vennir Vellala that is a Vellala by birth, in the Huzur plates of king Karunandakkan, the predecessor of Vikramaditya Varaguna.

The Irunkovel or Irukkuvel chieftains were another ancient Velir clan who ruled from their capital Kodumbalur (near Pudukottai district). They were related to the Cholas by marriage. In an inscription of Rajadhiraja Chola an Irukkuvel feudatory who was a high-ranking military officer (Dandanayaka) of the king is described as a Velala. (Note: Records in his third year gift of 90 sheep for a lamp by Velala Madurantakam alias Tandanayakan Rajadhiraja Ilangovelan of Nadar, a village in Tiraimur-nadu which was a sub-division of Uyyakondan-valanadu in Solamandalam.)

The Irungovels are considered to be of the same stock as the Hoysalas as in one of the Sangam poems, the ancestor of the Irungovel chieftain is said to have ruled the fortified city of Tuvarai. This city is identified with the Hoysala capital Dwarasamudra by some historians. Also, the legend of the chief killing a tiger (Pulikadimal) has a striking resemblance to the origin legend of the Hoysalas where ‘'sala'’ kills the tiger to save a sage. As per historian Arokiaswami, the Hoysala title ‘'Ballala'’ is only a variant of the Tamil word ‘'Vellala'’. The Hoysala king Veera Ballala III is even now locally known as the ‘'Vellala Maharaja'’ in Thiruvannamalai, the town that served as their capital in 14th century.

=== The Chola period ===
According to the anthropologist Kathleen Gough, "the Vellalars were the dominant secular aristocratic caste under the Chola kings, providing the courtiers, most of the army officers, the lower ranks of the kingdom's bureaucracy, and the upper layer of the peasantry".

Two identical Tamil inscriptions from Avani and Uttanur in Mulbagal Taluk dated in the 3rd year of Kulottunga I (about 1072-1073 CE) describe how the great army of the right hand class (perumpadai valangai mahasenai) having arrived with great weapons of war from the 78-nadus of Chola-mandalam and the 48000-bhumi of Jayangonda-cholamandalam (the northern districts of Tamil Nadu that is Tondaimandalam) conquered and colonized southern Karnataka (Kolar district) by the grace of Rajendrachola (Kulottunga I).

Historian Burton Stein who has done a detailed analysis of this inscription equates the Valangai military forces and the Velaikkara troops of the Cholas with the Vellalas and notes that the contents of the above inscription confirm this identification. The Velaikkara troops were special units of armed forces drawn from the right-hand castes that were close to the king. The units were generally named after the king like Rajaraja-terinda-valangai-velaikkarar, that is the known (terinda) forces of king Rajaraja Chola I. The Chola inscriptions state that the Velaikkara forces pledged under oath to commit suicide in case they failed to defend their king or in the event of his death. The Chalukya kings were also known by the title Velpularasar, that is kings of Vel country (pulam means region or country in Tamil) and as Velkulattarasar, that is kings of the Vel clan (kulam), in epigraphs and in the old Tamil lexicon Divakaram.

The Vellalar also contributed to the Bhakti movement in south India from the seventh century CE onwards and helped revive Hinduism. Many of the Nayanmars, the Shaiva saints, were Vellalar. In the 12th century CE, saint Sekkilan Mahadevadigal Ramadeva sang the glories of these Nayanmars in his magnum opus, the Periyapuranam. Sekkizhar was born in a Vellala family in Kundrathur in Thondaimandalam and had the title Uttama Chola Pallavaraiyan. Sekkilan Mahadevadigal Ramadeva was an elder contemporary of Kulothunga Chola II, the king who is said to have persecuted the Brahmin philosopher Ramanuja for his Vaishnavite preachings by forcing him to sign a document stating Shiva is the greatest god.

== Sri Lanka ==
The Vellalars of Sri Lanka have been chronicled in the Yalpana Vaipava Malai and other historical texts of the Jaffna kingdom. They form half of the Sri Lankan Tamil population and are the major husbandmen, involved in tillage and cattle cultivation. Local Sri Lankan literature, such as the Kailiyai Malai, an account on Kalinga Magha, narrates the migration of Vellala Nattar chiefs from the Coromandel Coast to Sri Lanka.

Their dominance rose under Dutch rule and they formed one of the colonial political elites of the island.

== In Jainism ==
At present, most of the Tamil Jains are from the Vellalar social group. Also, the Saiva Velaalar sect are originally believed to have been Jainas before they embraced Hinduism. (Note: It is also widely believed that the Saiva Vellalas of Madras State who are stricter vegetarians than even Tamil Brahmins, were Jainas.) The Tamil Jains refer to the Saiva Velaalar as nīr-pūci-nayinārs or nīr-pūci-vellalars meaning the vellalars who left Jainism by smearing the sacred ash or (tiru)-nīru. (Note: All of those who feared for their lives converted to Saivism (and not any other religious sect) adorning the sacred ash, 'throwing away their sacred threads', they assumed the identity of Saiva (nir-puci) vellalars or nir-puci-nayinars (the Jainas who smeared sacred ash).) While some of the Jains assign this conversion to the period of the Bhakti movement in Tamil Nadu others link it to a conflict with a ruler of the Vijayanagar empire in the 15th century. The villages and areas settled by the Saiva Velaalar even now have a small number of Jaina families and inscriptional evidence indicate that these were earlier Jaina settlements as is evident by the existence of old Jaina temples.

== In Christianity ==
A segment of the Vellalar community in Tamil Nadu and Sri Lanka embraced Christianity during the 16th–19th centuries under European colonial influence. These Christian Vellalars maintained their traditional social prominence, often serving as lay leaders in churches or intermediaries between missionaries and local communities. Scholars note that missionary efforts often accommodated Vellalar social prestige to ease conversions, resulting in hybrid identities that preserved caste hierarchies within Christian frameworks.

Notably, the Kovilpillai Kovil (கோவில்): "Temple" in Tamil.Pillai (பிள்ளை): A title meaning "child," "son" among the Vellalars transitioned their roles into Christian contexts. Historically responsible for overseeing Hindu temple lands and rituals, Christian Kovilpillai adapted their authority to manage church properties and mediate between colonial missionaries and local communities. David Mosse highlights that these elites retained their socio-religious influence by blending agrarian stewardship with ecclesiastical duties, ensuring caste-based hierarchies persisted even after conversion.For example, upper-caste Christian Vellalars, including Kovilpillai, often segregated themselves from Dalit converts during worship, maintaining exclusive control over church leadership and ritual spaces.

== Current usage ==
Even though at present, the term "Vellalar" is uncertain, a number of non-cultivating landholding castes like Kaarukaatha Velaalar and the Kondaikatti Velaalar who served ruling dynasties in various capacities also identify themselves as Vellalar. (Note: Among the Tamil castes, both Karkattar Vellalas (Arunachalam, 1975) and Kondaikatti Vellalas (Barnett, 1970) have much the same profile as the KP (Kottai Pillaimar): both are non-cultivating land-holders, with a history of service to ruling dynasties.) Likewise, the Kottai Pillaimar who were traditionally land-holders and lived inside forts, neither lease land for agriculture nor do they till their own fields. They also do not supervise cultivation directly due to the stigma attached to farming and manual labor. Similarly, the Vellala Chettis, a branch of the Chozhia Vellalars were traders and merchants. The Adi-saiva vellalar sect is a strictly vegetarian Saivite group that traditionally served as priests.

== Social status ==
The Vellalar were considered to be of high status and enjoyed a high rank during the Chola period. They helped promote and stabilize Shaivism during the Chola era and many of the cult's leaders were drawn from the ranks of the Vellalar. They were a prosperous community of farmers and landowners who had provided economic support to Shiva temples in the Tamil country. In the Tamil region, Vellalar like Mudaliyar and Pillai along with certain other non-brahmin groups enjoyed a status equal to that of the Brahmins. The Vellalar also had more authority, power and status than the Brahmins in some social and ritual contexts. They were more orthodox than the Brahmins in their religious practices. The Vellalar nobles had marriage alliances with Chola royal families.

The Smarta Brahmins have always competed with the Tamil Shaivites for religious influence in the temples in the Kaveri delta region. The Smarta adopted the worship of Hindu deities and combined their Sanskritic background with Tamil Saiva and Vaishnava devotionalism and eventually identified themselves as Shaivites and started worshipping in Shiva temples.

From the Sangam period to the Chola period of Indian history (A.d. 600 to 1200), state-level political authority was in the hands of relatively low, Vellalar chieftains, who endowed local and nonlocal Brahmins with land and honors, and were in turn legitimized by them.

== See also ==
- Pallavaraiyan
- List of Vellalars
- List of Vellalar sub castes
- Ponnambalam-Coomaraswamy family
