= A. Lakshmanaswami Mudaliar =

Indian physician

Sir A. Lakshmanaswami Mudaliar FRCOG FACS
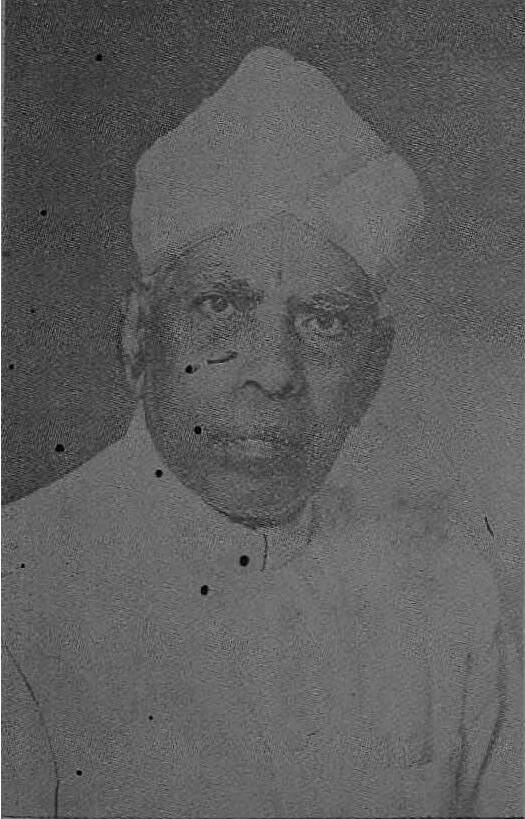
- Born: 14 October 1887
- Died: 15 April 1974 (aged 86); Madras, India
- Education: Madras Christian College
- Relatives: Sir Arcot Ramasamy Mudaliar (brother)
- Awards: Padma Bhushan, Padma Vibhushan

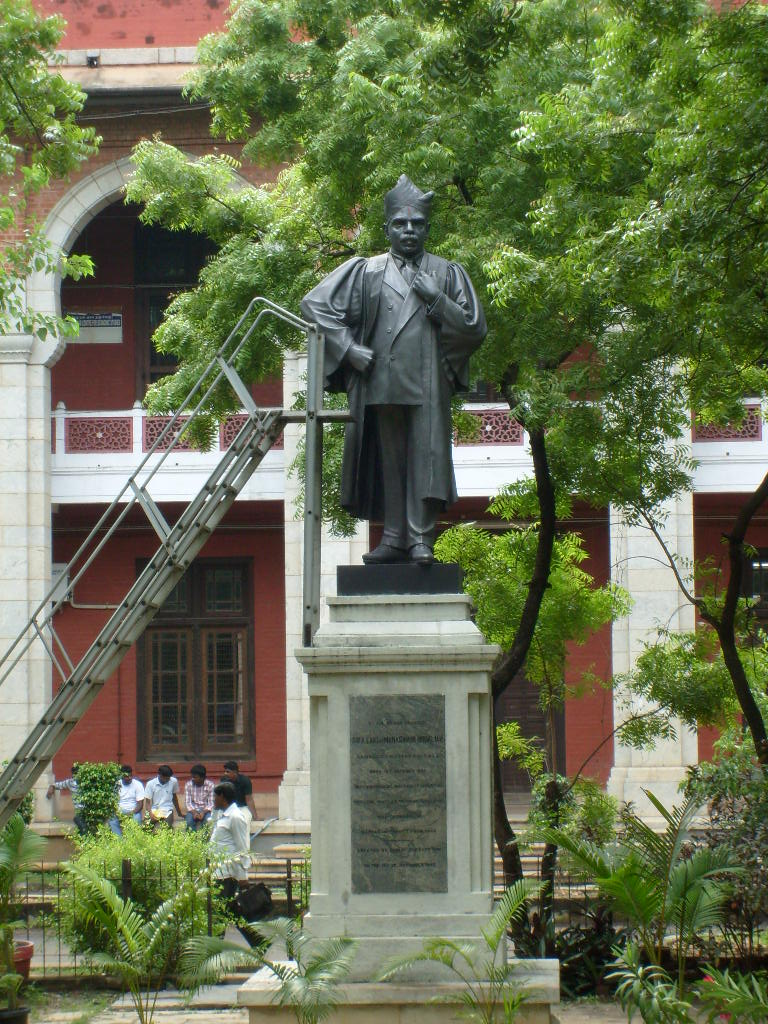
Statue of Lakshmanaswami Mudaliar in the Senate House, University of Madras

Diwan Bahadur Sir Arcot Lakshmanaswami Mudaliar, FRCOG, FACS (14 October 1887 – 15 April 1974) was an Indian educationist and physician. He was the identical younger twin brother of Sir A. R. Mudaliar. His education began in Kurnool, and they moved to Chennai in 1903.

He pursued his education from the Madras Christian College. He later went on to become the longest serving Vice-Chancellor of Madras University (for 27 years) and principal of Madras Medical College. He was also the Deputy Leader of the Indian delegation to the First World Health Assembly in Geneva in 1948. He was elected as the chairman of the World Health Organization (WHO) Executive Board in 1949 and 1950, was vice-president of the Eighth World Health Assembly in 1955 and President of the Fourteenth World Health Assembly in 1961. He contributed to educational reforms in India as Chairman of the Secondary Education Commission (1952-53), with the Commission being named as Mudaliar Commission.

== Awards and honors ==
- He was knighted in the 1945 New Year Honours,
- Awarded the Padma Bhushan in 1954 and the Padma Vibhushan in 1963.
- He served as General President of the 46th Indian Science Congress held in 1959.

== Textbooks ==
- Clinical Obstetrics first edition 1938; later revised as Mudaliar and Menon, 10th edition, ISBN 81-250-2870-6
