= Vettuva Gounder =

Indian community

The Vettuva Gounder community is predominantly located in the southern Indian states of Tamil Nadu and Kerala. Historically, they have been associated with agriculture, cattle rearing, and other rural occupations, which form the backbone of their traditional livelihood. Their agrarian roots have contributed significantly to the farming economy in these regions, establishing the Vettuva Gounders as an integral part of the rural landscape.

In Tamil Nadu, the Vettuva Gounders are eligible for affirmative action policies aimed at enhancing educational and economic opportunities. These measures have opened pathways for members of the community to pursue higher education and professional careers, gradually contributing to improved socioeconomic mobility. Government support through reservations in education and employment has played a key role in supporting their progress.

Culturally, the Vettuva Gounders maintain a distinct identity with unique festivals, rituals, and traditional attire that reflect their deep connection to regional heritage. Despite embracing modern changes, they continue to celebrate and uphold their traditional customs, bridging the gap between their heritage and contemporary Indian society. This cultural resilience allows them to adapt to societal shifts while preserving their distinct cultural identity and values.

== Marriages ==
Vettuva Gounders’ marriages are multi-day functions and happen on non-consecutive days.

The marriage function starts with “Murtha Kall,” which marks the initiation of the marriage. It is performed in front of the house by installing a Vebbala stick tied with a yellow cloth filled with navadhanyas. During the day of the Murtha Kall pooja, the bride’s or bridegroom’s family will fast and eat only after the pooja.

The marriage usually begins with the modern custom of combining the marriage and Nichiyadartham (betrothal) together. The bride is offered clothes and gold from the bridegroom’s family. The bridegroom’s sisters will place flowers and a tilak on the bride. During that time, the history of the bride’s and bridegroom’s families, usually starting from Kalhasti to their current generation, will be explained (Kulam Othudhal), usually by the elder of the family (Pangalis).

Later, they perform the Seer (series of rituals). The bridegroom will be shaved by the bride’s family barber (barbers are usually experts in medicines and body conditions; he will ensure that the bridegroom is really fit). The next ritual involves the bridegroom taking a bath in front of the bride’s male relatives to reassure them of his health. Similarly, the bride will also take a bath in front of the bridegroom’s female relatives, and usually, the bridegroom’s sister will dress the bride to ensure she is healthy.

On the marriage day, a puja will be performed on the Nattukal in the early morning for both the bride and bridegroom. Following that is the Murtham with Thalli tying; they play games to build intimacy.

The bride will be taken to the bridegroom’s house and back to the bride’s house. On the next available good day, Yennai Theipuu, they do the oil bath to prepare the bride and bridegroom to relieve stress and prepare for their first night together, usually in the bridegroom’s place. The bride’s father, mother, and Pangalis will visit their Sammandhi’s with sweets and Kara Sampanthi Allippu. They mix, share, and eat. It is an official meeting.

== Kannappa Nayanar ==
Kannappa Nayanar, one of the 63 venerated Shaiva Nayanar saints, was known for his profound devotion to Lord Shiva. Originating from the Vettuva Gounder community, Kannappa, initially a hunter, became a revered figure for his unshakable faith and selfless acts, such as offering his own eyes to Shiva as a testament to his devotion. His life of sacrifice and dedication is honored in Tamil religious literature, symbolizing ultimate, selfless love for God.
