= Gounder =

Title used by certain communities in Tamil Nadu, South India

Gounder (IPA: [kɐ(ʋ)uɳɖɐɾ, ɡɐ(ʋ)uɳɖɐɾ]) is a title used by various communities in the Indian state of Tamil Nadu. It may refer to various communities such as Vettuva, Kongu Vellalar, Vanniyar, and Kurumba, Uralis[w:ta].

== Etymology ==
There are a number of derivations for the title. One theory derives it from the Tamil word Kaamindan, meaning "noble protector of the country", later modified as Kavundan or Gounder.

According to S. N. Sadasivan, some of these Vellalars branched off from the Vokkaligas and both might have a common origin from the Kurumba.

== History ==
During the British Raj era, some Gounders migrated to Malayan rubber plantations as Kanganis to manage the coolies.
