= Kongu Vellalar =

Tamil community

- Classification: Backward Class
- Languages: Tamil (Kongu Tamil)
- Country: India
- Original state: Tamil Nadu

Kongu Vellalar is a community found in the Kongu region of Tamil Nadu, India.

== Etymology ==
The Vellalar of the Kongu country came to be known as Kongu Vellalar. They are also known by names such as "Bupaalan", Gangavamsam, Kudiyaanavar and Vivasaayi, and use the title Gounder as a caste appellation in their personal names.

== Origin ==
According to the Kongu Vellalar Puranam, a 19th-century work by Mahavidwan Kandasamy Kavirayar, the Vellalar of the Kongu country trace their origin to Marabalan, a mythical figure who was created from the river Ganges to rid the world of hunger. Marabalan turned to agriculture and his descendants became the Vellalar. Marabalan had various titles such as Gangavamsa, Devar, Vellalar, Bupaalan, etc. Interestingly the Gandadikara Vokkaligas of the neighbouring parts of Karnataka also claim origin from the banks of the Ganges. According to Burton Stein, the Gangadikaras and the Kongu Vellalars were linked.

== History ==
From the early Sangam period, the Kongu region had always been a "frontier zone," only loosely controlled by the various Tamil dynasties from the plains. Due to their isolation, the people of this region had always been most associated with muscle power and the "heroic" ideals of the Sangam age. While these "heroic" traditions faded in the rest of the plains region due to the rise of agrarian states, the Kongu region and other remote buffer zones kept it alive until the 11th century CE. In Upper Kongu (north of the Kaveri), the natukal tradition was still present. This cultural combination of the heroic traditions and megalithic burials greatly influenced Kongu Nadu's culture. After the end of the Sangam period, the Vettuvar (hunter) tribe gained dominance over the other tribes of the region such as the Kurumbar, Ay, and Kuravar, which led to a large number of peoples associating themselves with the Vettuvar. This caused a Vettuvar population explosion in the early 9th century and created a complex social structure, with the chieftains of the Vettuvars calling themselves Koundar. However, by the 11th century CE, the influence of the Bhakti movement and Brahminical values from the plains largely displaced the Sangam traditions. Thus some groups of the Vettuvars became full-time agriculturalists, calling themselves Vettuvavelalar.

Large groups of peasants from the plains soon began to migrate into the Kongu Nadu region starting in the 10th century from many places, with migration peaking in the 13th century. Their technological advancement allowed them to generally outcompete the earlier inhabitants in land ownership and agricultural production. Most initially identified with their clan names and their chiefs with the Gounder title, but eventually coalesced into a single group called Kongu Vellalar Gounder. The Kongu Vellalars also had complex relations with the locals, sometimes friendly, sometimes hostile, and many locals were assimilated into the ethnogenesis of the Gounders. The early pre-migration institutions were modified to include the emerging peasant class. Other communities migrated along with the peasants, including potters, barbers, craftsmen, as well as Brahmins and Dalits. However Brahmins played a negligible role in the new social formation, since the Kongu Vellalars and their dependent communities never used Brahmins for religious ceremonies. However, eventually this period of ethnogenesis would end in the creation of a hierarchical structure with Kongu Vellalars at the top.

The Kongu Vellalar were inhabitants of the Kongu country since at least the 10th century CE. The Vellalars of Kongu region came to be known as Kongu Vellalar or Gounder, though both the names have also been treated separately in some regions. According to Beck's (1972) study, the Kongu Vellalar are one of the top ranking castes who were entitled to ownership over land. They followed a kingly model acquiring prestige by ownership of land, control of daily labor and production activity.

Today, the Gounders have presided over Kongu Nadu's transition from an agricultural to industrial economy. Gounders traditionally controlled most of the land in western Tamil Nadu, and had the Arunthathiyar community as labourers. When MGNREGA was introduced, Gounder farmers were furious as it prevented the Arunthathiyars from working in their fields. Thanks to their land ownership, the Gounders were also able to control the industrialization of the Kongu belt and consequently most industrialists in the region are Gounder. The community plays a significant role in the political and economic life of the Kongu Nadu region. The prominent Kongu Nadu-based parties, Kongunadu Munnetra Kazhagam and later Kongunadu Makkal Desiya Katchi, were primarily Gounder caste outfits similar to the PMK for Vanniyars. Some scholars saw the KMK's presence in the Kongu belt as contributing to the ADMK's victory in those constituencies.

== Traditional duties ==
The traditional roles of this community are agriculture and cattle-rearing, but over time they came to be landowners, weavers, traders and money-lenders.

== Caste structure ==
The caste is divided into a number of exogamous clans called Kootams, each of which is totemistic. Medieval poet Kambar is said to have given their kula and gotra (kin and clan). The community has 24 Nadus (countries), which originated they claim from the time of their settlement. These Nadus are arranged in 4 groups of 6 villages each headquartered at Palayakottai, Kangayam, Pudur and Kadayur. The village head is a kottukaran, the head of a nadu is nattukavundan or periyatanakaran and each group of Nadus is a pattakaran. The pattakaran is treated with considerable respect, and is very rarely consulted. The kottukaran and nattukavundan generally take care of caste disputes and marriage selection respectively, and only important caste disputes are handled by him.

== Culture ==
=== Marriage ===
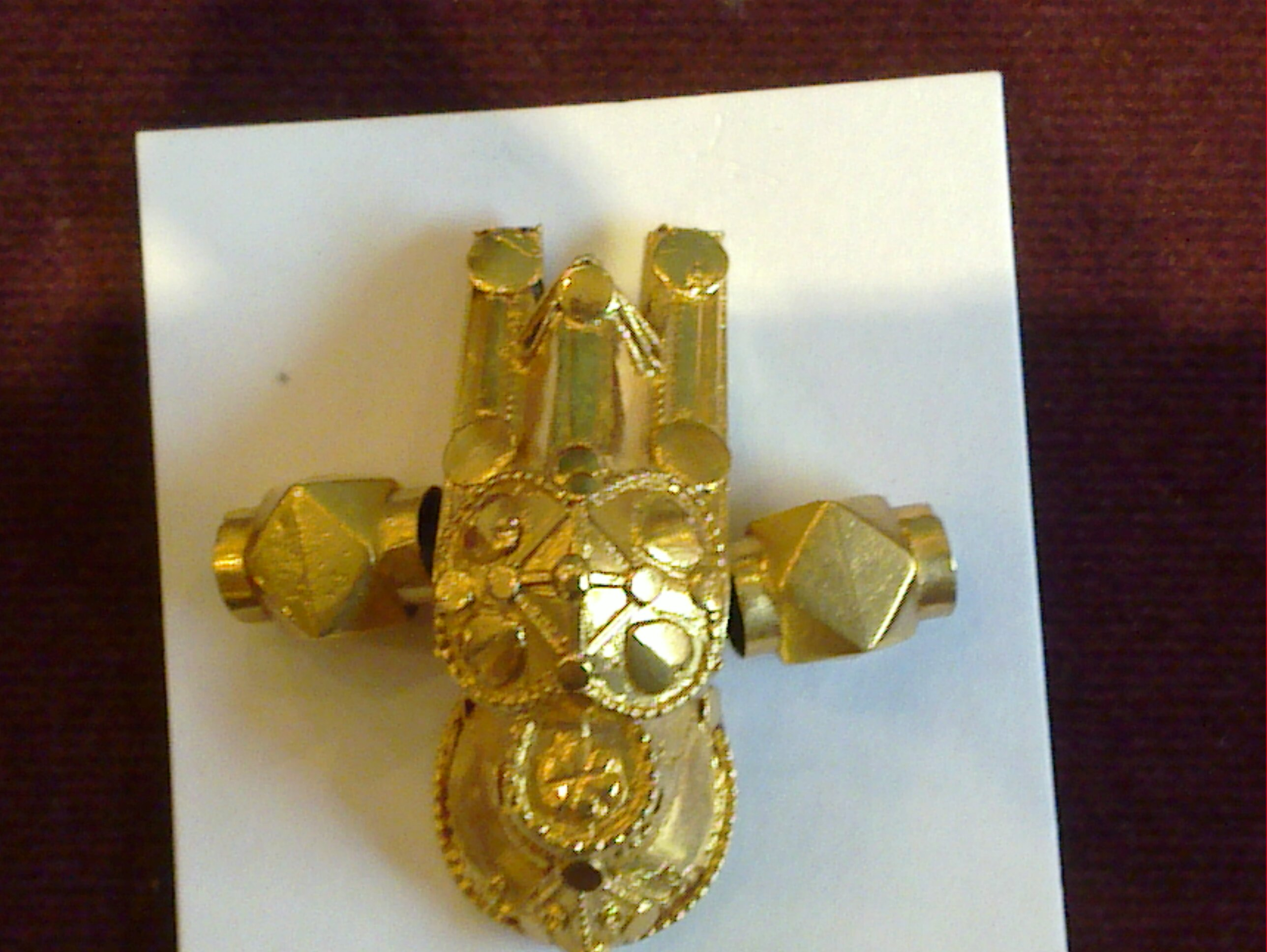
Kongu Vellalar thaali. Compared to other communities, their thaalis are particularly large.

The community has its own style of marriage ceremony. The ceremony is led by person called an Arumbukarar or Arumaikkarar, who must be married and should have children. The engagement ceremony takes place at the bride's house, with the maternal uncles of both groom and bride present, where fruit and betel leaf are tied in the girl's clothes. On the day of the wedding, the groom is shaven, and a karumaikkarari pours water on his head. If he has a sister, he performs a betrothal ceremony for his daughter to her son. He then goes on horseback to a nattukal with fruit and a pestle and worships it. The stone is said to represent the Kongu king and the worship is a symbolic request for permission of the marriage, as in the old days the king was supposed to give permission for every marriage. On his return, balls of white and coloured rice are taken around the bridegroom and his mother feeds him 3 mouthfuls of food. This indicates she will no longer feed him and he is going out into the world on his own. A barber then blesses him and they go to the bride's house on horseback, where they are met by someone from the bride's party similarly mounted. The groom then gives his earrings to the bride, and they are carried on their respective maternal uncles to the nattukal. When they return, they are touched by an arumaikkarar with a betel leaf dipped on oil, milk and water. They worship the thaali and the arumaikkaran ties it around the bride's neck. Then he and the barber sing a long song composed by poet-saint Kambar, called "Mangala Valthu", speaking of the glory of marriage. Then the little fingers of bride and groom and linked, milk is poured over them, and separated. In the wedding ceremony, the brother of the bride and sister of the groom play significant roles.

Widow remarriage was forbidden at the turn of the 20th century, and those who had intimate relations with widows were ostracised. The punishment was lifted if the widow consented to the man leaving her, the man provided the widow with sufficient means to live herself, and the man provided a feast to his family by killing a black sheep.

== Present status ==
The Kongu Vellalar were classified as a Forward Caste (General class) at the time of Indian independence but they successfully requested to be reclassified as an other Backward Class in 1975.
