= List of Tamil people =

This is a list of notable Tamils.

== Ancient Kings and Rulers ==
=== Tamil dynasties ===
- Chola dynasty
- Pandya dynasty
- Chera dynasty
- Pallava dynasty
- Ay dynasty
- Velir dynasty
- Aryacakravarti dynasty
- Vanni dynasty
- Rajahnate of Cebu
- Kongu Chera dynasty

=== Other royal families ===
- Rulers of Ramnad
  - Ramanatha Sethupathi (?–1979), last Raja of Ramnad estate
  - Rajeswari Nachiyar, only daughter of last Raja Ramanatha Sethupathi, present titular ruler of Ramnad estate
  - Rajkumar Sethupathi, actor, brother of last Raja Ramanatha Sethupathi and Latha, married leading actress in the 1980s Sripriya
  - Latha, actress, sister of last Raja Ramanatha Sethupathi and actor Rajkumar Sethupathi
- Rulers of Pudukkottai
  - Rajagopala Thondaiman (1922–1997), last ruler of the princely state of Pudukkottai
  - R. Rajagopala Thondaiman (1958–?), present head of the royal house of Pudukkottai, son of Radhakrishna Thondaiman, nephew of last ruler Rajagopala Thondaiman
  - Charubala Thondaiman (1958–), wife of R. Rajagopala Thondaiman, member of the INC, former mayor of Tiruchirappalli (2001–2009)

== Multinational positions ==
- Radhika Coomaraswamy (1953–), Under-Secretary-General of the United Nations, Special Representative for Children and Armed Conflict
- Roy Padayachie (1950–2012), Minister of Public Service and Administration of the Republic of South Africa; also served in the economics desk of the ANC in KwaZulu-Natal and as deputy head of local government portfolio; consultant to UNICEF, UNESCO and the World Bank
- Sundar Pichai, CEO of Google
- Indra Nooyi, Indian-American business executive and former chairman and chief executive officer (CEO) of PepsiCo
- Raghuram Rajan, former IMF Chief Economist

== Independence movement ==
=== Indian independence movement ===
- Nagappan Padayatchi (1891 – 6 July 1909)
- Maveeran Alagumuthu Kone (1710–1757)
- Puli Thevar (1715–1767)
- Marudhanayagam pillai (1725–1764)
- Rani Velu Nachiar (1730–1796)
- Rettamalai Srinivasan (1860–1945)
- Dheeran Chinnamalai
- Subramanya Bharathi (1882–1921), poet and social reformer
- V. Kalyanasundaram (1883–1953), scholar
- Subramaniya Siva (1884–1925), writer
- Dawood Shah (1885–1969), scholar
- Muhammad Ismail Rowther (1896–1972)
- Jeevanandham (1907–1963)
- Champakaraman Pillai (1891–1934)
- Tiruppur Kumaran (1904–1932)
- K. Kamaraj (1903–1975)
- Veeran Sundaralingam (1770–1799)
- Pasumpon Muthuramalinga Thevar
- V. O. Chidambaram pillai (1872–1936)

=== Independence movements in other countries ===
- Thillaiaadi Valliammai (1898–1914), South African militant
- Captain Miller (1966–1987), Tamil rebel and member of the Tamil Tigers, a separatist Tamil militant organisation in Sri Lanka; known as the LTTE's first Black Tiger (suicide bomber).
- V. T. Sambanthan (1919–1979), one of the three founding fathers of Malaysia
- Pon Sivakumaran (1950–1974), Eelam Tamil rebel and the first Tamil militant to commit suicide by swallowing cyanide
- Ponnambalam Ramanathan, leader in the Sri Lankan independence movement
- Ponnambalam Arunachalam, leader in the Sri Lankan independence movement
- Cankili I also known as Cekaracacekaran VII, most remembered Jaffna kingdom king in the Eelam Tamil history. He was very active in resisting Portuguese colonial inroads into Eelam.
- Cankili II, known as the last King of the Jaffna Kingdom
- Arumaipperumal, Batticaloa chieftain in the 18th century who led a rebellion against the British colonial occupiers in 1803
- Pandara Vanniyan (1775–1810), Tamil Chieftain who ruled in Vanni Nadu in 18th century AD. He is referred to by some as the last Tamil king in Sri Lanka, who also rose to revolt against the British Ceylon empire and Dutch Ceylon empire, who died battling the British colonial rule on the island.
- Periyapillai, known to mount the major attack on the Portuguese fort in the Mannar Island to regain territory lost during Cankili's rule
- Migapulle Arachchi also known as Chinna Migapillai, feudal lord from the Jaffna Kingdom who became a rebel leader just after its annexation by the Portuguese Empire in 1619. His title Arachchi, is a title given to the commanders of Lascarins or native military forces.
- Varunakulattan, 17th-century feudal lord and military commander from the Jaffna Kingdom. He led a rebellion as the military commander of Thanjavur Nayak against the Portuguese in their conquest of the Jaffna kingdom in 1619. Although the nominal king was Cankili II, Varunakulattan was described as the king of Karaiyars, and wield the real power in the Jaffna Peninsula.
- Puviraja Pandaram
- Kasi Nayinar Pararacacekaran
- Ethirimana Cinkam
- S. A. Ganapathy (1912 or 1917 – 4 May 1949), was a veteran of the communist underground resistance during Japanese occupation and postwar trade unionist in then Malaya (Peninsular Malaysia).
- Charles Tambu (1907-1965), a representative of the Indonesia government in international diplomacy.

== Contributions to Tamil people ==
- Marshal Nesamony (1895–1968), responsible for Kanyakumari district merger with Tamil Nadu
- Varadarajan Mudaliar (1926–1988), known as Vardha Bhai; the Tamil movie Nayakan was based on his life story
- Thamizhavel G. Sarangapani, Singaporean Tamil pioneer

== Governor-Generals ==
No.	Name (Birth–Death)	Country	Term of office		
No.	Name (Birth–Death)	Country	Assumed office	Left office	Time in office
1	C. Rajagopalachari (1878–1972)	India	21 June 1948	26 January 1950	1 year, 219 days
2	Veerasamy Ringadoo (1920–2000)	Mauritius	17 January 1986	12 March 1992	6 years, 55 days

== Presidents ==
No.	Name (Birth–Death)	Country	Term of office		
No.	Name (Birth–Death)	Country	Assumed office	Left office	Time in office
1	Sarvepalli Radhakrishnan (1888–1975)	India	13 May 1962	13 May 1967	5 years
2	R. Venkataraman (1910–2009)	India	25 July 1987	25 July 1992	5 years
3	Veerasamy Ringadoo (1920–2000)	Mauritius	12 March 1992	30 June 1992	110 days
4	S. R. Nathan (1924–2016)	Singapore	1 September 1999	1 September 2011	12 years
5	A. P. J. Abdul Kalam (1931–2015)	India	25 July 2002	25 July 2007	5 years
6	Tharman Shanmugaratnam (b. 1957)	Singapore	14 September 2023	Incumbent	3 years, 33 days

== Vice Presidents ==
No.	Name (Birth–Death)	Country	Term of office		
No.	Name (Birth–Death)	Country	Assumed office	Left office	Time in office
1	Sarvepalli Radhakrishnan (1888–1975)	India	13 May 1952	12 May 1962	9 years, 364 days
2	R. Venkataraman (1910–2009)	India	31 August 1984	24 July 1987	2 years, 327 days
3	Angidi Veeriah Chettiar (1928–2010)	Mauritius	1 July 1997	17 February 2002	7 years, 252 days
3	Angidi Veeriah Chettiar (1928–2010)	Mauritius	25 August 2007	15 September 2010	7 years, 252 days
4	Moses Nagamootoo (b. 1947)	Guyana	20 May 2015	2 August 2020	5 years, 74 days
5	Paramasivum Pillay Vyapoory (b. 1964)	Mauritius	4 April 2016	25 November 2019	3 years, 235 days
6	Kamala Harris (b. 1964)	USA	20 January 2021	20 January 2025	4 years
7	C. P. Radhakrishnan (b. 1957)	India	12 September 2025	Incumbent	1 year, 35 days

== Prime Ministers ==
No.	Name (Birth–Death)	Country	Term of office		
No.	Name (Birth–Death)	Country	Assumed office	Left office	Time in office
1	Moses Nagamootoo (b. 1947)	Guyana	20 May 2015	2 August 2020	5 years, 74 days

== Deputy Prime Ministers ==
No.	Name (Birth–Death)	Country	Term of office		
No.	Name (Birth–Death)	Country	Assumed office	Left office	Time in office
1	Tharman Shanmugaratnam (b. 1957)	Singapore	21 May 2011	30 April 2019	7 years, 344 days

== Chief Justices ==
No.	Name (Birth–Death)	Country	Term of office		
No.	Name (Birth–Death)	Country	Assumed office	Left office	Time in office
1	M. Patanjali Sastri (1889–1963)	India	7 November 1951	3 January 1954	2 years, 57 days
2	P. Sathasivam (b. 1949)	India	19 July 2013	26 April 2014	281 days

== Governors of states ==
No.	Name (Birth–Death)	State	Term of office		
No.	Name (Birth–Death)	State	Assumed office	Left office	Time in office
1	C. Rajagopalachari (1878–1972)	West Bengal	15 August 1947	21 June 1948	311 days
2	P. S. Kumaraswamy Raja (1898–1957)	Odisha	10 February 1954	11 September 1956	2 years, 214 days
3	P. Subbarayan (1889–1962)	Maharashtra	17 April 1962	6 October 1962	172 days
4	Jothi Venkatachalam (1917–Unknown)	Keralam	14 October 1977	26 October 1982	5 years, 12 days
5	M. M. Ismail (1921–2005)	Tamil Nadu	27 October 1980	3 November 1980	7 days
6	P. Ramachandran (1921–2001)	Keralam	27 October 1982	23 February 1988	5 years, 119 days
7	T. V. Rajeswar (1926–2018)	Sikkim	21 November 1985	1 March 1989	3 years, 100 days
7	T. V. Rajeswar (1926–2018)	West Bengal	2 March 1989	6 February 1990	341 days
7	T. V. Rajeswar (1926–2018)	Uttar Pradesh	8 July 2004	28 July 2009	5 years, 20 days
7	T. V. Rajeswar (1926–2018)	Rajasthan	1 November 2004	8 November 2004	7 days
8	C. Subramaniam (1910–2000)	Maharashtra	5 February 1990	9 January 1993	2 years, 339 days
9	Shanmughasundaram Mohan (1930–2019)	Karnataka	5 February 1990	8 May 1990	92 days
10	Viswanathan Ratnam (1932–2020)	Himachal Pradesh	10 July 1994	30 July 1994	20 days
11	Gopala Ramanujam (1915–2001)	Goa	4 August 1994	15 June 1995	315 days
11	Gopala Ramanujam (1915–2001)	Odisha	18 June 1995	30 January 1997	2 years and 164 days
11	Gopala Ramanujam (1915–2001)	Odisha	13 February 1997	13 December 1997	2 years and 164 days
11	Gopala Ramanujam (1915–2001)	Andhra Pradesh	22 August 1997	23 November 1997	93 days
12	C. Rangarajan (b. 1932)	Andhra Pradesh	24 November 1997	3 January 2003	5 years, 40 days
12	C. Rangarajan (b. 1932)	Odisha	27 April 1998	14 November 1999	1 year, 201 days
12	C. Rangarajan (b. 1932)	Keralam	29 February 2000	23 April 2000	85 days
12	C. Rangarajan (b. 1932)	Keralam	19 October 2000	7 November 2000	85 days
12	C. Rangarajan (b. 1932)	Keralam	16 February 2002	28 February 2002	85 days
12	C. Rangarajan (b. 1932)	Tamil Nadu	3 July 2001	17 January 2002	198 days
13	A. Padmanaban (1928–Unknown)	Mizoram	2 May 1998	30 November 2000	2 years, 212 days
14	M. M. Rajendran (1935–2023)	Odisha	15 November 1999	17 November 2004	5 years, 2 days
15	E. S. L. Narasimhan (b. 1945)	Chhattisgarh	25 January 2007	23 January 2010	2 years, 363 days
15	E. S. L. Narasimhan (b. 1945)	Andhra Pradesh	28 December 2009	23 July 2019	9 years, 207 days
15	E. S. L. Narasimhan (b. 1945)	Telangana	2 June 2014	7 September 2019	5 years, 97 days
16	M. O. H. Farook (1937–2012)	Jharkhand	22 January 2010	3 September 2011	1 year, 224 days
16	M. O. H. Farook (1937–2012)	Keralam	8 September 2011	26 January 2012	140 days
17	M. K. Narayanan (b. 1934)	West Bengal	24 January 2010	30 June 2014	4 years, 157 days
17	M. K. Narayanan (b. 1934)	Sikkim	7 April 2010	27 April 2010	20 days
18	Sasindran Muthuvel (b. 1974)	West New Britain	16 July 2012	Incumbent	14 years, 93 days
19	P. Sathasivam (b. 1949)	Keralam	5 September 2014	5 September 2019	5 years
20	V. Shanmuganathan (b. 1949)	Meghalaya	20 May 2015	27 January 2017	1 year, 252 days
20	V. Shanmuganathan (b. 1949)	Manipur	30 September 2015	20 August 2016	325 days
20	V. Shanmuganathan (b. 1949)	Arunachal Pradesh	14 September 2016	27 January 2017	135 days
21	Tamilisai Soundararajan (b. 1961)	Telangana	8 September 2019	19 March 2024	4 years, 193 days
22	La. Ganesan (1945–2025)	Manipur	27 August 2021	21 February 2023	1 year, 178 days
22	La. Ganesan (1945–2025)	West Bengal	18 July 2022	22 November 2022	127 days
22	La. Ganesan (1945–2025)	Nagaland	20 February 2023	15 August 2025	2 years, 176 days
23	C. P. Radhakrishnan (b. 1957)	Jharkhand	18 February 2023	30 July 2024	1 year, 153 days
23	C. P. Radhakrishnan (b. 1957)	Telangana	19 March 2024	31 July 2024	134 days
23	C. P. Radhakrishnan (b. 1957)	Maharashtra	31 July 2024	11 September 2025	1 year, 42 days

== Lieutenant governors of union territories ==
No.	Name (Birth–Death)	Union territory	Term of office		
No.	Name (Birth–Death)	Union territory	Assumed office	Left office	Time in office
1	T. V. Rajeswar (1926–2018)	Arunachal Pradesh	10 August 1983	21 November 1985	2 years, 103 days
2	Tamilisai Soundararajan (b. 1961)	Puducherry	16 February 2021	18 March 2024	3 years, 31 days
3	C. P. Radhakrishnan (b. 1957)	Puducherry	22 March 2024	6 August 2024	137 days

== Chief Ministers ==
No.	Name (Birth–Death)	State	Term of office		
No.	Name (Birth–Death)	State	Assumed office	Left office	Time in office
1	A. Subbarayalu Reddiar (1855–1921)	Madras Presidency	17 December 1920	11 July 1921	206 days
2	P. Subbarayan (1889–1962)	Madras Presidency	4 December 1926	27 October 1930	3 years, 327 days
3	B. Munuswamy Naidu (1885–1935)	Madras Presidency	27 October 1930	4 November 1932	2 years, 8 days
4	P. T. Rajan (1892–1974)	Madras Presidency	4 April 1936	24 August 1936	142 days
5	C. Rajagopalachari (1878–1972)	Madras Presidency	14 July 1937	29 October 1939	2 years, 107 days
5	C. Rajagopalachari (1878–1972)	Tamil Nadu	10 April 1952	13 April 1954	2 years, 3 days
6	Omanthur P. Ramaswamy Reddiar (1895–1970)	Madras Presidency	23 March 1947	6 April 1949	2 years, 14 days
7	P. S. Kumaraswamy Raja (1898–1957)	Madras Presidency	6 April 1949	25 January 1950	294 days
7	P. S. Kumaraswamy Raja (1898–1957)	Tamil Nadu	26 January 1950	9 April 1952	2 years, 74 days
8	K. Kamaraj (1903–1975)	Tamil Nadu	13 April 1954	2 October 1963	9 years, 172 days
9	M. Bhakthavatsalam (1897–1987)	Tamil Nadu	2 October 1963	5 March 1967	3 years, 154 days
10	V. Venkatasubba Reddiar (1909–1982)	Puducherry	11 September 1964	8 April 1967	3 years, 40 days
10	V. Venkatasubba Reddiar (1909–1982)	Puducherry	6 March 1968	18 September 1968	3 years, 40 days
11	C. N. Annadurai (1909–1969)	Tamil Nadu	6 March 1967	3 February 1969	1 year, 334 days
12	M. O. H. Farook (1937–2012)	Puducherry	9 April 1967	5 March 1968	10 years, 248 days
12	M. O. H. Farook (1937–2012)	Puducherry	17 March 1969	3 January 1974	10 years, 248 days
12	M. O. H. Farook (1937–2012)	Puducherry	17 March 1985	7 March 1990	10 years, 248 days
13	V. R. Nedunchezhiyan (1920–2000)	Tamil Nadu	3 February 1969	10 February 1969	21 days
13	V. R. Nedunchezhiyan (1920–2000)	Tamil Nadu	24 December 1987	7 January 1988	21 days
14	M. Karunanidhi (1924–2018)	Tamil Nadu	10 February 1969	31 January 1976	18 years, 360 days
14	M. Karunanidhi (1924–2018)	Tamil Nadu	27 January 1989	30 January 1991	18 years, 360 days
14	M. Karunanidhi (1924–2018)	Tamil Nadu	13 May 1996	13 May 2001	18 years, 360 days
14	M. Karunanidhi (1924–2018)	Tamil Nadu	13 May 2006	15 May 2011	18 years, 360 days
15	S. Ramassamy (1939–2017)	Puducherry	6 March 1974	28 March 1974	1 year, 155 days
15	S. Ramassamy (1939–2017)	Puducherry	2 July 1977	12 November 1978	1 year, 155 days
16	M. G. Ramachandran (1917–1987)	Tamil Nadu	30 June 1977	17 February 1980	10 years, 65 days
16	M. G. Ramachandran (1917–1987)	Tamil Nadu	9 June 1980	24 December 1987	10 years, 65 days
17	M. D. R. Ramachandran (1934–2024)	Puducherry	16 January 1980	24 June 1983	4 years, 155 days
17	M. D. R. Ramachandran (1934–2024)	Puducherry	8 March 1990	4 March 1991	4 years, 155 days
18	V. N. Janaki Ramachandran (1923–1996)	Tamil Nadu	7 January 1988	30 January 1988	23 days
19	J. Jayalalithaa (1948–2016)	Tamil Nadu	24 June 1991	12 May 1996	14 years, 124 days
19	J. Jayalalithaa (1948–2016)	Tamil Nadu	14 May 2001	21 September 2001	14 years, 124 days
19	J. Jayalalithaa (1948–2016)	Tamil Nadu	2 March 2002	12 May 2006	14 years, 124 days
19	J. Jayalalithaa (1948–2016)	Tamil Nadu	16 May 2011	27 September 2014	14 years, 124 days
19	J. Jayalalithaa (1948–2016)	Tamil Nadu	23 May 2015	5 December 2016	14 years, 124 days
20	V. Vaithilingam (b. 1950)	Puducherry	4 July 1991	26 May 1996	7 years, 215 days
20	V. Vaithilingam (b. 1950)	Puducherry	4 September 2008	15 May 2011	7 years, 215 days
21	R. V. Janakiraman (1941–2019)	Puducherry	27 May 1996	21 March 2000	3 years, 299 days
22	P. Shanmugam (1927–2013)	Puducherry	22 March 2000	26 October 2001	1 year, 218 days
23	O. Panneerselvam (b. 1951)	Tamil Nadu	21 September 2001	2 March 2002	1 year, 106 days
23	O. Panneerselvam (b. 1951)	Tamil Nadu	28 September 2014	23 May 2015	1 year, 106 days
23	O. Panneerselvam (b. 1951)	Tamil Nadu	6 December 2016	15 February 2017	1 year, 106 days
24	N. Rangasamy (b. 1950)	Puducherry	27 October 2001	3 September 2008	17 years, 130 days
24	N. Rangasamy (b. 1950)	Puducherry	16 May 2011	5 June 2016	17 years, 130 days
24	N. Rangasamy (b. 1950)	Puducherry	7 May 2021	Incumbent	17 years, 130 days
25	Sivanesathurai Chandrakanthan (b. 1975)	Eastern Province	16 May 2008	18 September 2012	4 years, 125 days
26	C. V. Wigneswaran (b. 1939)	Northern Province	7 October 2013	23 October 2018	5 years, 16 days
27	V. Narayanasamy (b. 1947)	Puducherry	6 June 2016	25 February 2021	4 years, 264 days
28	Edappadi K. Palaniswami (b. 1954)	Tamil Nadu	16 February 2017	6 May 2021	4 years, 79 days
29	M. K. Stalin (b. 1953)	Tamil Nadu	7 May 2021	9 May 2026	5 years, 2 days
30	C. Joseph Vijay (b. 1974)	Tamil Nadu	10 May 2026	Incumbent	163 days

== Deputy chief ministers ==
No.	Name (Birth–Death)	State	Term of office		
No.	Name (Birth–Death)	State	Assumed office	Left office	Time in office
1	M. K. Stalin (b. 1953)	Tamil Nadu	29 May 2009	15 May 2011	1 year, 350 days
2	O. Panneerselvam (b. 1951)	Tamil Nadu	21 August 2017	6 May 2021	3 years, 255 days
3	Udhayanidhi Stalin (b. 1977)	Tamil Nadu	28 September 2024	5 May 2026	1 year, 219 days

== Deputy Speakers of the Lok Sabha ==
No.	Name (Birth–Death)	Term of office		
No.	Name (Birth–Death)	Assumed office	Left office	Time in office
1	G. Lakshmanan (1924–2001)	1 December 1980	31 December 1984	4 years, 30 days
2	M. Thambi Durai (b. 1947)	22 January 1985	27 November 1989	9 years, 229 days
2	M. Thambi Durai (b. 1947)	13 August 2014	25 May 2019	9 years, 229 days

== Union Ministers ==
- R. K. Shanmukham Chetty (1892–1953), Minister of Finance (1947–1948)
- N. Gopalaswami Ayyangar (1882–1953), Minister of Defence (1952–1953)
- K. Santhanam (1895–1980), Minister of State for Transport and Railways (1948–1952)
- C. Rajagopalachari (1878–1972), Minister of Home Affairs (1950–1951)
- P. Subbarayan (1889–1962), Minister of Transport and Communications (1959–1962)
- C. Subramaniam (1910–2000), Minister of Defence (1979–1980)
- Mohan Kumaramangalam (1916–1973), Minister of Steel and Mines (1971–1973)
- Sathiavani Muthu (1923–1999), Minister of Social Welfare (1979–1979)
- Aravinda Bala Pajanor (1935–2013), Minister of Petroleum, Chemicals and Fertilizers (1979–1979)
- P. Chidambaram (1945–), Minister of Finance (2012–2014)
- Murasoli Maran (1934–2003), Minister of Commerce and Industry (1999–2002)
- Subramanian Swamy (1939–), Minister of Commerce, Law and Justice (1990–1991)
- M. Arunachalam (1944–2004), Minister of Chemicals and Fertilizers (1997–1998)
- T. R. Baalu (1941–), Minister of Shipping, Road Transport and Highways (2004–2009)
- P. R. Kumaramangalam (1952–2000), Minister of Power (1998–2000)
- Sedapatti R. Muthiah (1945–2022), Minister of Surface Transport (1998–1998)
- M. Thambidurai (1947–), Minister of Law, Justice, Company Affairs and Surface Transport (1998–1999)
- R. K. Kumar (1942–1999), Minister of State for Parliamentary Affairs and Finance (1998–1998)
- Kadambur M. R. Janarthanan (1929–2020), Minister of State for Personnel, Public Grievances, Pensions and Finance (1998–1999)
- K. Ramamurthy (1940–2002), Minister of Petroleum and Natural Gas (1998–1999)
- Gingee N. Ramachandran (1944–), Minister of State for Textiles (2003–2003)
- A. Raja (1963–), Minister of Communications and Information Technology (2009–2010)
- Pon. Radhakrishnan (1952–), Minister of State for Finance (2017–2019)
- K. Jana Krishnamurthy (1928–2007), Minister of Law and Justice (2002–2003)
- A. K. Moorthy (1964–), Minister of State for Railways (2002–2004)
- M. K. Alagiri (1951–), Minister of Chemicals and Fertilizers (2009–2013)
- G. K. Vasan (1964–), Minister of Shipping (2009–2014)
- Anbumani Ramadoss (1968–), Minister of Health and Family Welfare (2004–2009)
- Mani Shankar Aiyar (1941–), Minister of Panchayati Raj (2004–2009)
- S. S. Palanimanickam (1950–), Minister of State for Finance (2004–2013)
- K. Venkatapathy (1947–), Minister of State for Law and Justice (2004–2009)
- Subbulakshmi Jagadeesan (1947–), Minister of State for Social Justice and Empowerment (2004–2009)
- R. Velu (1940–), Minister of State for Railways (2004–2009)
- S. Regupathy (1950–), Minister of State for Environment and Forests (2007–2009)
- Dayanidhi Maran (1966–), Minister of Textiles (2009–2011)
- V. Radhika Selvi (1976–), Minister of State for Home Affairs (2007–2009)
- D. Nepoleon (1963–), Minister of State for Social Justice and Empowerment (2009–2013)
- S. Jagathrakshakan (1950–), Minister of State for Commerce and Industry (2012–2013)
- V. Narayanasamy (1947–), Minister of State for Personnel, Public Grievances and Pensions (2010–2014)
- Nirmala Sitharaman (1959–), Minister of Finance and Corporate Affairs (2019–Incumbent)
- S. Jaishankar (1955–), Minister of External Affairs (2019–Incumbent)
- L. Murugan (1977–), Minister of State for Fisheries, Animal Husbandry and Dairying (2021–2024); Minister of State for Information and Broadcasting (2021–Incumbent); Minister of State in the Ministry of Parliamentary Affairs (2024–Incumbent)

== Political leaders outside of India ==
- Tun Ali, (1445–1456), Bendahara of the Sultanate of Malacca
- Tun Mutahir, (1500–1510), Bendahara of the Sultanate of Malacca
- Moses Veerasammy Nagamootoo (1947–), Prime Minister, Guyana
- Jeanne Dupleix, (1706–1756), French political advisor
- S. Jayakumar (1939–), former deputy prime minister, Singapore
- Shiva Ayyadurai, American conservative influencer, entrepreneur, and engineer
- Tharman Shanmugaratnam (1957–), President of Singapore, former deputy prime minister and Minister for Finance, Singapore
- Vivian Balakrishnan (1961–), Minister for Foreign Affairs, Singapore
- Indranee Rajah (1963–), Minister in the Prime Minister's Office, Second Minister for Finance and Second Minister for National Development, Singapore
- K. Shanmugam (1959–), Minister for Law and Minister for Home Affairs, Singapore
- S. Rajaratnam (1915–2006), former deputy prime minister, Singapore
- S. Dhanabalan (1937–), former Minister (various portfolios), Singapore
- S. Iswaran (1962–), Minister for Transport, Singapore
- S. R. Nathan (1924–2016), former president of Singapore
- J. B. Jeyaretnam (1926–2008), ex-opposition leader and MP, Singapore
- Ramasamy Palanisamy (1949–), Deputy Chief Minister of Penang state, Malaysia
- K. S. Rajah, Senior Counsel and former Judicial Commissioner of the Supreme Court of Singapore
- Nagalingam Shanmugathasan (1920–1993), founding General Secretary of the Ceylon Communist Party, Sri Lanka
- Bala Tampoe (1922–2014), Tamil trade unionist, Sri Lanka
- Pillayan alias Sivanesathurai Chandrakanthan (1975–), former chief minister of Eastern Province, Sri Lanka
- P. P. Devaraj (1929–), former Cabinet Minister of Sri Lanka
- Visvanathan Rudrakumaran, Prime Minister of the Transnational Government of Tamil Eelam
- Samy Vellu (1937–2022), former Works Minister and Leader of Malaysian Indian Congress, Malaysia
- K. R. Somasundram (1930–), politician and member of Malaysian Indian Congress, Malaysia
- Joshua Benjamin Jeyaretnam (1926–2008), founder of Reform Party of Singapore
- Kenneth Jeyaretnam (1959–), Secretary-General of Reform Party of Singapore
- Janil Puthucheary (1972–), Party Whip of the People's Action Party, Singapore
- Radhakrishna Padayachi (1950–2012), Deputy Minister for Communication, Republic of South Africa
- Rathika Sitsabaiesan (1981–), Member of Parliament, Canada
- Gunasagaran Gounder, prominent politician and a member of Fiji Labour Party, Fiji
- Perumal Mupnar, prominent politician and a member of Fiji Labour Party, Fiji
- S. J. V. Chelvanayakam (1898–1977), leader and father figure of Sri Lankan Tamils
- Savumiamoorthy Thondaman (1913–1999), leader of Indian Tamils of Sri Lanka and had served the Sri Lankan Cabinet
- N. Shanmugathasan (1920–1993), prominent Communist politician, Sri Lanka
- Joseph Pararajasingham (1934–2005), Member of Parliament, Sri Lanka
- Lakshman Kadirgamar (1932–2005), former foreign minister, Sri Lanka
- Veerasingham Anandasangaree (1933–), Member of Parliament, Sri Lanka
- Murugesu Sivasithamparam (1923–2002), Member of Parliament, Sri Lanka
- Rajavarothiam Sampanthan (1933–), Member of Parliament, Sri Lanka
- Dr. Neelan Tiruchelvam (1944–1999), Member of Parliament, Sri Lanka
- Appapillai Amirthalingam (1927–1989), leader of the opposition, Parliament of Sri Lanka
- Douglas Devananda (1957–), leader of EPDP and Minister of Rehabilitation, Sri Lanka
- Thamizhavel G. Sarangapani (1903–1974), Tamil journalist, writer, publisher, social activist
- Patrick Pillay, Minister of External Affairs of the Seychelles
- Jean-Paul Virapoullé (1944–), member of the Senate of France, representing the island of Réunion
- Raja Krishnamoorthi (1973–), American congressman
- E. E. C. Thuraisingham (1898–1979), first local Member in British-ruled Malaya
- Maya Harris, Vice President for Democracy, Rights and Justice at the Ford Foundation and executive director of the American Civil Liberties Union (ACLU) of Northern California.
- Vanushi Walters, New Zealand lawyer, politician and Member of Parliament in the House of Representatives for the Labour Party representing the Upper Harbour electorate
- Vivek Ramaswamy, candidate in the USA 2024 Republican Party presidential primaries

== Governors of the Reserve Bank of India ==
- S. Venkitaramanan, 18th governor of the Reserve Bank of India
- C. Rangarajan, 19th governor of the Reserve Bank of India
- Raghuram Rajan, 23rd governor of the Reserve Bank of India

== Political families ==
=== Tamil Nadu ===
==== C. Rajagopalachari family ====
- C. Rajagopalachari (1878–1972), former governor-General of India
  - C. R. Narasimhan (1909–1989), former member of parliament (Lok Sabha); son of Rajagopalachari

==== C.P. Ramaswami Iyer family ====
- C. P. Ramaswami Iyer (1879–1966), former Dewan of Travancore
  - C. P. R. Pattabhiraman (1906–2001), former Union Minister of Law and Company Affairs; son of Ramaswami Iyer

==== D. Jayakumar family ====
- D. Jayakumar (1960–), former speaker of Tamil Nadu Legislative Assembly
  - J. Jayavardhan (1987–), Former member of parliament (Lok Sabha); son of Jayakumar

==== E. V. K. Sampath family ====
- E. V. K. Sampath (1926–1977), former member of parliament (Lok Sabha)
  - E. V. K. S. Elangovan (1948–), Former Union Minister of State in the Ministry of Textiles; son of E. V. K. Sampath

==== G. K. Moopanar family ====
- G. K. Moopanar (1931–2001), former member of parliament (Rajya Sabha)
  - G. K. Vasan (1964–), Former Union Minister of Shipping; son of Moopanar

==== H. Kumari Ananthan family ====
- H. Kumari Ananthan (1933–), Former member of parliament (Lok Sabha)
  - Tamilisai Soundararajan (1961–), Governor of Telangana; daughter of Kumari Ananthan
- H. Vasanthakumar (1950–2020), former member of parliament (Lok Sabha); brother of Kumari Ananthan
  - Vijay Vasanth (1983–), Member of Parliament (Lok Sabha); nephew of Kumari Ananthan

==== M. Bhakthavatsalam family ====
- M. Bhakthavatsalam (1897–1987), former chief minister of Tamil Nadu
  - Jayanthi Natarajan (1954–), Former Union Minister of Environment and Forests; granddaughter of Bhakthavatsalam

==== M. Karunanidhi family ====
- M. Karunanidhi (1924–2018), former chief minister of Tamil Nadu
  - M. K. Alagiri (1951–), Former Union Minister of Chemicals and Fertilizers; son of Karunanidhi
  - M. K. Stalin (1953–), Chief Minister of Tamil Nadu; son of Karunanidhi
  - Kanimozhi Karunanidhi (1968–), Member of Parliament (Lok Sabha); daughter of Karunanidhi
    - Dayanidhi Alagiri (unknown–), Indian cinema producer; grandson of Karunanidhi
    - Udhayanidhi Stalin (1977–), Member of Legislative Assembly (Tamil Nadu); grandson of Karunanidhi
    - Arulnithi Tamilarasu (1987–), Indian actor; grandson of Karunanidhi
  - Murasoli Maran (1934–2003), Former Union Minister of Commerce and Industry; nephew of Karunanidhi
    - Kalanithi Maran (1964–), Founder of the Sun Group; grand-nephew of Karunanidhi
    - Dayanidhi Maran (1966–), Former Union Minister of Communications and Information Technology; grand-nephew of Karunanidhi

==== An O. Panneerselvam family ====
- O. Panneerselvam (1951–), former chief minister and Deputy Chief Minister of Tamil Nadu
  - P. Ravindhranath (1980–), Member of Parliament (Lok Sabha); son of Panneerselvam

==== P. Subbarayan family ====
- P. Subbarayan (1889–1962), former chief minister of Madras Presidency; former Union Minister of Transport and Communications
  - Mohan Kumaramangalam (1916–1973), Former Union Minister of Steel and Mines; son of Subbarayan
  - Parvathi Krishnan (1919–2014), member of the Communist Party of India; daughter of Subbarayan
    - Rangarajan Kumaramangalam (1952–2000), Former member of parliament (Lok Sabha); grandson of Subbarayan
      - Rangarajan Mohan Kumaramangalam (1978–), member of the Indian National Congress; great-grandson of Subbarayan
    - Lalitha Kumaramangalam (1957–), member of the National Executive of the BJP; granddaughter of P. Subbarayan

==== P. T. Rajan family ====
- P. T. Rajan (1892–1974), former chief minister of Madras Presidency
  - P. T. R. Palanivel Rajan (1932–2006), former speaker of the Tamil Nadu Legislative Assembly; son of P.T. Rajan
    - P. T. R. Palanivel Thiagarajan, Finance Minister of Tamil Nadu; grandson of P.T. Rajan

=== Sri Lanka ===
==== Arumugampillai Coomaraswamy family ====
- Arumugampillai Coomaraswamy (1783–1836), Gate Mudaliyar, Member of Legislative Council
  - Muthu Coomaraswamy (1833–1879), Member of Legislative Council, son of Arumugampillai Coomaraswamy
    - Ananda Coomaraswamy (1877–1947), grandson of Arumugampillai Coomaraswamy

==== Arunachalam Ponnambalam family ====
- Arunachalam Ponnambalam (1814–1887), son in law of Arumugampillai Coomaraswamy
  - P. Coomaraswamy (1849–1906), first son of Arunachalam Ponnambalam
  - P. Ramanathan (1851–1930), second son of Arunachalam Ponnambalam
    - Arunachalam Mahadeva (1885–1969), son of P. Ramanathan
      - Baku Mahadeva (1921–2013), grandson of P. Ramanathan
  - P. Arunachalam (1853–1924), third son of Arunachalam Ponnambalam

==== S. Pararajasingam family ====
- S. Pararajasingam, senator, son in law of P. Arunachalam, married Pathmavathy (daughter of P. Arunachalam)

==== V. P. Ganeshan family ====
- V. P. Ganeshan, founder of the Democratic Workers' Congress, film producer and actor
  - Mano Ganesan (1959–), Member of Parliament, Provincial Councillor, son of V.P. Ganeshan
  - Praba Ganesan (1964–), Member of Parliament, Provincial Councillor, son of V.P. Ganeshan

==== Savumiamoorthy Thondaiman family ====
- Savumiamoorthy Thondaiman (1913–1999), founder and leader of the Ceylon Workers' Congress, government minister, Member of Parliament
    - Arumugam Thondaiman (1964–), leader of the Ceylon Workers' Congress, Member of Parliament, grandson of Savumiamoorthy Thondaiman

==== G. G. Ponnambalam family ====
- G. G. Ponnambalam (1901–1977), founder and leader of the All Ceylon Tamil Congress, government minister, Member of Parliament, Member of State Council
  - Kumar Ponnambalam (1940–2000), former leader of the All Ceylon Tamil Congress, presidential candidate (1982), son of G.G. Ponnambalam
    - Gajendrakumar Ponnambalam (1974–), present leader of the All Ceylon Tamil Congress, son of Kumar Ponnambalam, grandson of G.G. Ponnambalam

==== Arumugam Canagaratnam family ====
- Arumugam Canagaratnam (1873–1929), Member of Legislative Council
  - Cathiravelu Sittampalam (1898–1964), government minister, Member of Parliament, son of A. Cathiravelu, nephew of A.Canagaratnam
  - Cathiravelu Ponnambalam, first mayor of Jaffna, son of A. Cathiravelu, nephew of A. Canagaratnam

== Military leaders ==
=== Army ===
- General Paramasiva Prabhakar Kumaramangalam (1913–2000), 7th Chief of Army Staff (1966–1969)
- General Krishnaswamy Sundararajan (1930–1999), 14th Chief of Army Staff (1986–1988)
- General Sundararajan Padmanabhan (1940–), 19th Chief of Army Staff (2000–2002)

=== Navy ===
- Admiral Oscar Stanley Dawson (1923–2011), 12th Chief of Naval Staff, India, 1982–1984
- Admiral Sushil Kumar (1940–2019), 16th Chief of the Naval Staff (India) (1988–2001)
- Vice Admiral Nilkanta Krishnan (1919–1982), Commanding-in-Chief of the Eastern Naval Command, India, 1947–1976
- Rear Admiral Rajan Kadiragamar, 2nd Ceylonese Captain of the Royal Ceylon Navy
- Admiral Travis Sinniah, 21st Commander of the Sri Lankan Navy

=== Air Force ===
- Air Chief Marshal Srinivasapuram Krishna Swamy (1943–), 19th Chief of Air Staff (2001–2004)

=== Independence Movement ===
- Velupillai Prabhakaran, founder of Liberation Tigers of Tamil Eelam
- Vaithilingam Sornalingam, also known as Colonel Shanker, was founder of the air wing and marine division of the Liberation Tigers of Tamil Eelam
- Ambalavanar Neminathan commonly known by the nom de guerre Raju) was a leading member of the Tamil Tigers, Raju served as the head of the LTTE's Engineering Corps. He was special commander of the Leopard Commandos, an infantry unit, and chief technical officer in the Kittu Regiment, the LTTE's artillery unit which Raju helped create.
- Pottu Amman, was the second-in-command of Tamil Tigers. was a Head of Tiger Organization Security Intelligence Service and the Black Tigers.
- Lt. Colonel Thileepan

== Award winners ==
=== Nobel Prize winners ===
- C. V. Raman, Nobel Prize in Physics, 1930
- Subrahmanyan Chandrasekhar, Nobel Prize in Physics, 1983
- Venkatraman Ramakrishnan, Nobel Prize in Chemistry, 2009
- Navanetham Pillay, Nobel Prize for Peace, 2026

=== Fields Medal ===
- Akshay Venkatesh, Fields Medal in mathematics, 2018

=== Bharat Ratna ===
The Bharat Ratna, Highest Civilian Award of the Republic of India

- C. Rajagopalachari, former governor-General of the Union of India; 1954
- Sarvepalli Radhakrishnan, former president of the Republic of India; 1954
- C. V. Raman, Indian physicist; 1954
- K. Kamaraj, former chief minister of Tamil Nadu; 1976
- M. G. Ramachandran, former chief minister of Tamil Nadu; 1988
- A. P. J. Abdul Kalam, former president of the Republic of India; 1997
- M. S. Subbulakshmi, Indian singer; 1998
- C. Subramaniam, former minister of defence of the Republic of India; 1998
- M. S. Swaminathan, Father of the Green Revolution in the Republic of India; 2024

=== Padma Vibhushan ===
The Padma Vibhushan is India's second highest civilian honour.

- Arcot Lakshmanaswami Mudaliar, for Medicine, 1963
- Subrahmanyan Chandrasekhar, for Science & Engineering, 1968
- K. V. Kalyana Sundaram, for Public Affairs, 1968
- Arcot Ramasamy Mudaliar, for Civil Service, 1970
- T. Swaminathan, for Civil Service, 1973
- T. Balasaraswati, for Arts, 1977
- V. Arunachalam, for Literature & Education, 1990
- Raja Jesudoss Chelliah, for Public Affairs, 2007
- Balu Sankaran, for Medicine, 2007
- V. Krishnamurthy, for Civil Service, 2007
- Ilaiyaraaja, for Music, 2018

=== Padma Bhushan ===
The Padma Bhushan is India's third highest civilian honour.

- Sivaji Ganesan, 1984
- Kamal Haasan, Arts
- Ilaiyaraaja, veteran musician and Tamil music director
- A. R. Rahman, Oscar-winning musician from Chennai; referred to as the Mozart of Madras
- Arogyaswami Paulraj, wireless technology pioneer
- Shiv Nadar, Indian industrialist and philanthropist
- Jayakanthan, author
- Krishnammal Jaganathan, Social Service

=== Padma Shri ===
The Padma Shri is India's fourth highest civilian honour.

- Sivaji Ganesan (1966), Arts
- K. Balachander (1987), Arts
- Vairamuthu (2003), Literature and Education
- B. Palaniappan (2006), Medicine
- Sivanthi Adithan (2008), Literature and Education
- Vivek (2009), Arts
- E. A. Siddiq (2011) Science
- Mecca Rafeeque Ahmed (2011), businessman and entrepreneur

=== Ramon Magsaysay Award ===
The Ramon Magsaysay Award was established in 1957 in memory of Ramon Magsaysay, the late president of the Philippines. It is often considered to be Asia's Nobel Prize.

- M. S. Swaminathan, for Community Leadership, 1971
- M. S. Subbulakshmi, for classical carnatic genre, 1974
- Jockin Arputham, for Peace and International Understanding, 2000
- Kulandei Francis, 2012
- T. M. Krishna, 2016

=== Dadasaheb Phalke Award ===
The Dadasaheb Phalke Award is India's highest award in cinema, given annually by the Government of India for lifetime contribution to Indian cinema. It was instituted in 1969, the birth centenary year of Dadasaheb Phalke, considered as the father of Indian cinema.

- Sivaji Ganesan, 1996
- K. Balachander, 2011
- Rajinikanth, 2019

=== Param Vir Chakra ===
The Param Vir Chakra is India's highest military honor.

- Major Ramaswamy Parmeshwaran (1946–1987), awarded in 1987 (posthumous) for IPKF operations in Sri Lanka

=== Major Dhyan Chand Khel Ratna Award ===
The Major Dhyan Chand Khel Ratna Award is India's highest sporting honor.

- Viswanathan Anand, for Chess, 1991–92
- Dhanraj Pillai, for Men's field hockey, 1999–2000
- Mariyappan Thangavelu, for Paralympic high jump, 2020–2021

=== Jnanpith Award ===
The Jnanpith Award is India's highest literary honor

- Akilan, 1975
- Jayakanthan, 2002

=== Sangeet Natak Akademi Award ===
- Vyjayanthimala, Sangeet Natak Akademi, 1982

=== Sangeet Natak Akademi Fellowship ===
- Karaikudi Sambasiva Iyer
- Ariyakudi Ramanuja Iyengar
- Papanasam R. Sivan
- V. Raghavan

=== Guinness World Records ===
- L. Athira Krishna, Guinness World Record holder
- Suresh Joachim, Canadian actor, producer, and multiple-Guinness World Record holder
- V. S. Kumar Anandan, his many records include swimming the Palk Strait, from Sri Lanka to India and back in 51 hours, in 1971
- Kutraleeswaran, swam across English Channel in 1994 when he was just 13 years old; the same year, he swam across six channels to break Mihir Sen's record of swimming across five channels in a calendar year
- Rajasekharan Parameswaran, Guinness World Records holder.
- Aari Arujunan, actor and Guinness World Record holder

=== Arjuna Award ===
The Arjuna Award was instituted in 1961 by the Government of India to recognize outstanding achievement in national sports.

- Kutraleeswaran, youngest Arjuna Award winner

=== Oscar awards ===
- A. R. Rahman, won the Academy Award for Best Original Score and Academy Award for Best Original Song in 2009
- Cottalango Leon, won the Academy Award for scientific and technical achievement "the design, engineering and continuous development"[a] of Sony Pictures Imageworks itView technology in 2016

== Social workers ==
- Pandit Iyothee Thass, Anti-caste activist, founding father of dravidian movement and first buddhist revivalist of India
- M. B. Nirmal, founder and chairman of Exnora International
- Suresh Joachim, founder and chairman of World Peace Marathon
- Krishnammal Jagannathan
- Naraina Pillai
- Anjali Gopalan, first Indian Tamil woman awarded with the Chevalier de la Légion d'honneur, "Knight in the order of the legions of Honor", the highest award from France, 2013
- Harish Iyer, Mumbai based blogger and LGBT rights activist
- Chinna Pillai, started Kalanjiam, a microcredit movement in villages
- Traffic Ramasamy, self-appointed traffic policeman, public interest litigator and social activist from Chennai
- Kumi Naidoo, Secretary General of Amnesty international
- Rettamalai Srinivasan, Dalit activist
- Pattukkottai Alagiri, Social activist

== Business and administration ==
=== Tamil billionaires ===
- Ananda Krishnan, Chairman of Usaha Tegas Snd Bhd
- Kalanithi Maran, founder and chairman of Sun Group
- Shiv Nadar, founder and chairman emeritus of HCL Technologies
- Ram Shriram, founding board member of Google
- A. Vellayan, vice-chairman of the Murugappa Group
- Maha Sinnathamby, businessman and property developer
- G. Gnanalingam, chairman of Westports Malaysia
- R. G. Chandramogan, entrepreneur
- Sundar Pichai, CEO of Alphabet Inc
- B. S. Abdur Rahman, entrepreneur and philanthropist
- T. S. Kalyanaraman, chairman and managing director of Kalyan Jewellers
- Subaskaran Allirajah, chairman of LycaMobile
- Sridhar Vembu, CEO of Zoho Corporation

=== Tamil executives and business people ===
- Palani G. Periasamy, Chairman of PGP Group of companies
- Indra Krishnamurthy Nooyi, former chairman and CEO of PepsiCo
- Sundar Pichai, CEO of Google, Inc.
- Neal Mohan, CEO of YouTube
- Vasant Narasimhan, CEO of Novartis
- Revathi Advaithi, CEO of Flex
- Ronald Arculli, Chairman of Hong Kong Exchanges and Clearing and Non-official Members Convenor of the Executive Council of Hong Kong (Exco)
- Prabhakar Raghavan, Senior vice President of Google Inc.
- Kalanidhi Maran, founder and head of Sun TV Network; ex-owner of SpiceJet Airline and owner of Sunrisers Hyderabad IPL team
- Natarajan Chandrasekaran, Chairman of Tata & Sons
- Subramaniam Ramadorai, adviser, Prime Minister of India
- N. Ravichandran, founder and chairman of TVH Group
- Suresh Joachim, CEO WBBAS, No Poverty No Disease No War, World Peace Marathon and Suresh Joachim International Group Of Companies.
- Ramamurthy Thyagarajan

== Educators ==
- L. S. Kandasamy, teacher at Tamil Nadu Agricultural University
- Jeppiaar, founder, Sathyabama University
- V. L. Ethiraj, founder, Ethiraj College for Women
- Rajalakshmi Parthasarathy, founder, Padma Seshadri Bala Bhavan
- B. S. Abdur Rahman, founder, B. S. Abdur Rahman University
- Munirathna Anandakrishnan, former chairman, Indian Institute of Technology Kanpur and former vice-chancellor, Anna University
- Bala V. Balachandran, founder, dean and chairman, Great Lakes Institute of Management
- V. M. Muralidharan, chairman, Ethiraj College for Women
- Subra Suresh, president of Carnegie Mellon University, former dean of the School of Engineering at the Massachusetts Institute of Technology, former director of the National Science Foundation
- Ramayya Krishnan, dean of Heinz College and H. John Heinz III, W. W. Cooper and Ruth F. Cooper Professor of Management Science and Information Systems at Carnegie Mellon University

== Philanthropists ==
- Annamalai Chettiar
- Pachaiyappa Mudaliar
- Chengalvaraya Naicker
- Kandasamy Kandar
- Kajamian Rowther
- Alagappa Chettiar
- T. M. Jambulingam Mudaliar
- Jamal Mohamed Rowther

== Diplomats ==
- Lakshman Kadirgamar, former Sri Lankan foreign minister and diplomat
- Gopalapuram Parthasarathy, diplomat and author in India
- Yogendra Duraiswamy, Sri Lankan diplomat
- Tamara Kunanayakam
- Arunachalam Mahadeva
- Anton Muttukumaru
- Manicasothy Saravanamuttu
- H. W. Thambiah
- Krishnan Srinivasan
- K. Raghunath
- Beno Zephine N L
- S. Jaishankar

== Journalists and broadcasters ==
- J. S. Tissainayagam, journalist, first winner of the Peter Mackler Award for Courageous and Ethical Journalism
- George Alagiah, BBC reporter and journalist
- James Coomarasamy, BBC reporter and journalist
- Ranga Yogeshwar, Luxembourgish physicist and science journalist
- Marc Fennell, Irish-Australian journalist, media personality, and author
- Darshini David, BBC reporter and journalist
- Tim Kash, MTV and BBC reporter and journalist
- Taraki Sivaram, political analyst and a senior editor for Tamilnet.com
- E. Saravanapavan, managing director of the Uthayan and Sudar Oli Tamil newspapers
- N. Ram, editor-in-chief of The Hindu newspaper owned by Kasturi and Sons
- Cho Ramaswamy, editor of the Tamil political journal Tughlaq
- Thenkachi Ko. Swaminathan, deputy director of All India Radio, 'Indru oru thagaval Fame'
- Hari Sreenivasan, Public Broadcasting Service
- Thangavelu Rajasegar, chief executive officer of Tamil Murasu, Straits Times Group, Singapore

== Scientists ==
- Mylswamy Annadurai, scientist with the Indian Space Research Organization; Director of ISRO Satellite Centre
- Shiva Ayyadurai, as a high school student in 1979, he developed an electronic version of an interoffice mail system, which he called "EMAIL" and copyrighted in 1982
- Kailasavadivoo Sivan, who served as chairperson of Indian Space Research Organization.

=== Social anthropologists ===
- Stanley Jeyaraja Tambiah

=== Academicians ===
- Arumugam Vijiaratnam, became the first Pro-Chancellor of Nanyang Technological University in 1992 and served until 2005
- Bala V. Balachandran, founder and dean of Great Lakes Institute of Management, Chennai, India; professor at Northwestern University
- V. L. Ethiraj, founder of Ethiraj College for Women
- Malcolm Adiseshiah (1910–1994), economist; former Deputy Director General of UNESCO; founder of MIDS (Madras Institute of Development Studies)
- V. C. Kulandaiswamy, educator and technologist; formerly Vice Chancellor of Anna University, IGNOU and Tamil Virtual University
- M. Varadarasan, winner of sahitya Academy Award; Ex-Vice Chancellor of Madurai Kamaraj University
- Prof Philip Jeyaretnam, professor of law; member of Public Service Commission
- Prof Sittampalam Shanmugaratnam, former Head of the Department of Obstetrics & Gynaecology at the National University of Singapore
- Arjun Appadurai, contemporary social theorist; educator; founder of the School of International Relations, JNU, New Delhi
- Dr. H.S.S. Lawrence, educator; formerly Director of School Education, Tamil Nadu; UNESCO Expert to the Government of Afghanistan
- C. K. Prahalad, Professor of Corporate Strategy at the Ross School of Business of the University of Michigan
- Prof B.P. Sanjay, vice-chancellor of First Central University in Tamil Nadu at Tiruvaroor
- M. S. Ananth, director of Indian Institute of Technology, Madras
- Xavier Thaninayagam, known for setting up the International Association for Tamil Research (IATR) and organising the first World Tamil Conference
- Christie Jayaratnam Eliezer, appointed a member of the Order of Australia
- Sanjay Subrahmanyam, awarded the Infosys Prize in the field of humanities (history) in 2012
- Indira Samarasekera, 12th and current president and vice-chancellor of the University of Alberta
- Vilayanur S. Ramachandran, neuroscientist known primarily for his work in the fields of behavioral neurology and visual psychophysics

=== Agriculture ===
- G. Nammalvar, Indian organic farming scientist
- E. A. Siddiq, agricultural scientist
- M. S. Swaminathan, agricultural scientist and Ramon Magsaysay Awardee

=== Botanists ===
- Ganapathi Thanikaimoni (1938–1986)
- M. O. P. Iyengar
- Dr. C. Livingstone

=== Computer science ===
- Ramanathan V. Guha, known for his work on Cyc, Schema.org, Meta Content Framework, Resource Description Framework; developed the first version of RSS
- Madhu Sudan (1966–), professor at the Massachusetts Institute of Technology; member of MIT Computer Science and Artificial Intelligence Laboratory
- Hari Balakrishnan, professor at the Massachusetts Institute of Technology; member of MIT Computer Science and Artificial Intelligence Laboratory
- Arogyaswami Paulraj (1944–), Professor of Electrical Engineering at Stanford University; a pioneer of wireless smart antenna technology
- Shiva Ayyadurai
- Ravindran Kannan, a principal researcher at Microsoft Research India
- T. V. Raman
- Sundar Pichai, CEO of Google

=== Finance and economics ===
- Marti Subrahmanyam, professor at New York University (NYU); on board of directors of Infosys and ICICI
- Bala V. Balachandran, professor at the Kellogg School of Management
- Ravi Jagannathan, economist and professor at the Kellogg School of Management
- H. V. R. Iyengar, ex-Governor of the Reserve Bank of India (1957–1962)
- S. Jagannathan, ex-Governor of the Reserve Bank of India (1970–1975); executive at the World Bank and International Monetary Fund (IMF)
- M. Narasimham, banker; ex-Governor of the Reserve Bank of India (1977); executive at the World Bank and IMF
- S. Venkitaramanan, ex-Governor of the Reserve Bank of India (1990–1992)
- K. Ramachandran, Director and CFO of Barclays Wealth, India (2008–)
- T. N. Srinivasan (1933–), economist; Samuel C. Park Jr. Professor of Economics at Yale University
- Raghuram Rajan, Professor at University of Chicago Booth School of Business, ex- Governor of Reserve Bank of India (2013–2016), Chief Economist, International Monetary Fund (IMF), (2003–2007)
- Sendhil Mullainathan, co-founder of Ideas-42
- Jomo Kwame Sundaram
- Ramon Navaratnam
- Raj Chetty, listed in 2008 by The Economist as one of the top eight young economists in the world
- Swaminathan Gurumurthy, Indian economist
- Arvind Subramanian, Indian Economist, Chief Economic Adviser to the Government of India (2014–2018)
- Krishnamurthy Subramanian, Indian Economist, Associate Professor in Indian School of Business and current Chief Economic Adviser to the Government of India (2018-)

=== Law ===
- K. Sripavan, Chief Justice of Sri Lanka; former Deputy Solicitor General; judge and president of the Court of Appeal; Puisne Justice of the Supreme Court of Sri Lanka
- Rajesh Sreenivasan
- Karthy Govender, Commissioner of the South African Human Rights Commission; law professor at the University of Natal
- K. S. Rajah, former Supreme Court Judge – Singapore
- Navanethem Pillay, United Nations High Commissioner for Human Rights; South African of Indian origin and Tamil descent; first non-white woman on the High Court of South Africa; has served as a judge of the International Criminal Court and President of the International Criminal Tribunal for Rwanda
- M. Patanjali Sastri, Second Chief Justice of India
- V. Bhashyam Aiyangar, lawyer and jurist
- A. Vaidyanatha Iyer(1890–1955), Tamil Indian activist; participated in the Indian independence movement and organized the temple entry movement in the Meenakshi Temple in Madurai; President of the Tamil Nadu Harijan Seva Sangh
- Mythili Raman, Tamil American lawyer; current acting Assistant Attorney General for the Criminal Division
- Sri Srinivasan, United States circuit judge of the United States Court of Appeals for the District of Columbia Circuit
- Muthucumaraswamy Sornarajah, C. J. Koh Professor of Law at the National University of Singapore
- Malliha Wilson, Former Assistant Deputy Attorney General of the Government of Ontario

=== Mathematics ===
- Srinivasa Ramanujan (1887–1920), known for his contributions to mathematical analysis, number theory, infinite series and continued fractions
- Swami Bharati Krishna Tirtha, known for his book Vedic Mathematics
- Ramachandran Balasubramanian, Indian number theorist; Director of the Institute of Mathematical Sciences in Chennai, India
- Subbayya Sivasankaranarayana Pillai (1901–1950), known for his work in number theory
- Kollagunta Gopalaiyer Ramanathan (1920–1992), known work in number theory
- Christie Jayaratnam Eliezer (1918–2001), mathematician and Tamil rights activist from Sri Lanka; recipient of the Order of Australia
- C. S. Seshadri, Director of the Chennai Mathematical Institute; Trieste awardee
- S. R. Srinivasa Varadhan, mathematician and fellow of the Royal Society, Abel Prize winner. Pioneer of LargeDeviations Theory.
- C. P. Ramanujam (1938–1974), worked on number theory and algebraic geometry
- T. S. Vijayaraghavan (1902–1955), worked on Pisot–Vijayaraghavan number
- Ravindran Kannan, Professor of Computer Science and Mathematics at Yale University; joint winner of the 1991 Fulkerson Prize in discrete mathematics for work on the volumes of convex bodies
- Kannan Soundararajan
- Ramaiyengar Sridharan
- Srinivasacharya Raghavan
- Madabusi Santanam Raghunathan
- A. A. Krishnaswami Ayyangar, exponent of Vedic mathematics
- Mudumbai Seshachalu Narasimhan, mathematician and fellow of the Royal Society (1996)
- K. R. Parthasarathy, professor emeritus at the Indian Statistical Institute of New Delhi
- Ramaiyengar Sridharan, mathematician at Chennai Mathematical Institute; awarded the Shanti Swarup Bhatnagar Prize for Science and Technology in Mathematical Science
- Raman Parimala, known for her contributions to algebra
- S. Ramanan, works in algebraic geometry
- Kavita Ramanan, daughter of S. Ramanan. Mathematician at Brown University

=== Medicine ===
- Balamurali Ambati, world's youngest doctor at age 17
- Rangaswamy Srinivasan, ultraviolet excimer laser / LASIK inventor at IBM Research
- V. S. Ramachandran, neuroscientist; Director Professor at UC San Diego
- S. S. Ratnam, pioneer in Singapore in-vitro fertilisation; Sri Lankan Tamil ancestry
- Ganapathi Thanikaimoni, palynologist at French Institute of Pondicherry; awarded the Fyson Prize in Natural Science
- Govindappa Venkataswamy, founder of Aravind Eye Hospital
- Ravi Iyengar, professor and founder of the Iyengar Laboratory, Mount Sinai School of Medicine
- Gunamudian David Boaz, Indian Tamil psychologist
- Paul Kalanithi, Neurosurgeon
- Manoj Durairaj, Cardiac surgeon, philanthropist and winner of Pro Ecclesia et Pontifice
- Soumya Swaminathan, Chief Scientist of WHO
- Celine Gounder, is an American Tamil infectious disease physician, internist, epidemiologist, filmmaker, and medical journalist who specializes in infectious disease and global health
- Raghavan Varadarajan, Molecular Biologist At Indian Institute Of Science, Bangalore
- V. Shanta, Cancer Specialist Head Of Adyar Cancer Institute

=== Engineering (scientists) ===
- Sir Chandrasekhara Venkata Raman, 1930 Nobel Prize winner in physics
- Subrahmanyan Chandrasekhar, 1983 Nobel Prize Winner in physics
- Dr. K. Kasturirangan, former chairman of ISRO; director of the National Institute of Advanced studies (NIAS)
- Raja Ramanna, former chairman of Department of Atomic Energy; presided over India's first nuclear test in 1974
- Dr. P. K. Iyengar, former chairman of Department of Atomic Energy
- M. R. Srinivasan, former chairman of the Department of Atomic Energy
- R. Chidambaram, scientific adviser to the prime minister of India and ex-chairman of Atomic Energy Commission
- S. R. Ranganathan, devised the five laws of library science
- A. Sivathanu Pillai, defence scientist; CEO of the Indo-Russian Brahmos company
- G. N. Ramachandran (1922–2001), made major contributions to biology and physics
- R. V. Perumal, former director of the Liquid Propulsion Systems Centre
- Ramanuja Vijayaraghavan (1931–), physicist at the Tata Institute of Fundamental Research
- Udaya Kumar, designer of the Indian rupee sign
- Vallampadugai Srinivasa Raghavan Arunachalam
- Poondi Kumaraswamy, only person to have received both the Homi Bhabha Fellowship 1967–69 and the Jawaharlal Nehru Fellowship 1975–77, two of the country's top research awards; hydrologist
- P. S. Krishnaprasad, professor of electrical engineering at the University of Maryland
- S. Somasegar, recipient of the Asian American Engineer of the Year Award
- S. Vanajah, the only woman among four finalists who outlasted 11,000 other Malaysians who applied for the astronaut selection process in 2003
- Ramamurti Shankar, John Randolph Huffman Professor of Physics at Yale University
- B. C. Shekhar, modernised Malaysia's natural rubber industry
- Raman Sundrum, developed a class of models called the Randall–Sundrum models
- Siva Sivananthan, awarded the "Champion of Change" (Immigrant Entrepreneurs and Innovators category) by the White House

=== Zoologists ===
- Mahadeva Subramania Mani, entomologist

== Music ==
=== Tamil music ===
- Muthu Thandavar, one of the Tamil Trinity
- Marimutthu Pillai, one of the Tamil Trinity
- Arunachala Kavi, one of the Tamil Trinity
- Kunangudi Mastan sahib
- Kollangudi Karuppayee
- Nagore E. M. Hanifa

=== Carnatic music ===
- Papanasam Sivan
- Sikkil Gurucharan
- Lalgudi Jayaraman
- Kunnakudi Vaidyanathan
- Ariyakudi Ramanuja Iyengar
- T. M. Krishna
- Madurai Mani Iyer
- Veena Dhanammal
- E. Gayathri
- D. K. Pattammal
- Semmangudi Srinivasa Iyer
- Muthuswami Dikshitar
- N. Ramani
- L. Athira Krishna
- Aruna Sairam
- T. Brinda
- T. Muktha
- T. Viswanathan
- R. Vedavalli
- Sirkazhi Govindarajan
- Maharajapuram Santhanam
- Sanjay Subrahmanyan
- T. M. Krishna
- T. M. Soundararajan
- Nithyashree Mahadevan
- Nirmala Rajasekar
- Nisha Rajagopalan
- Chinmayi
- Mahathi
- Aruna Sayeeram
- Alathur Brothers, Alathur Brothers Srinivasa Iyer (1912–1964) and Sivasubramania Iyer (1916–1980)
- Ariyakudi Ramanuja Iyengar
- Poochi Srinivasa Iyengar
- Patnam Subramania Iyer
- G. N. Balasubramaniam
- S. Sowmya
- M. L. Vasanthakumari
- Charumathi Ramachandran
- Vasundhara Devi
- Vyjayanthimala
- Abraham Pandithar, musicologist and siddha medicine practitioner from Madras Presidency, British India
- Ranjani & Gayatri

=== Hindustani music ===
- Chinmayi
- Hariharan

=== Film music ===
- K. V. Mahadevan (1918–2001), composer; winner of the National Film Award for Best Music Direction (1968 & 1980)
- T. K. Ramamoorthy (1922–2013), composer
- V. Kumar (1934–1996)
- Ilayaraja
- Gangai Amaran (1947–), composer, singer, director
- Chandrabose (?–2010), composer
- Shankar–Ganesh, composer
- Deva (1950–), composer, singer
- S. A. Rajkumar (1964–), composer
- Sirpy (1962–), composer
- A. R. Rahman (1967–), composer, singer, winner of Academy Award for Best Original Song, National Film Award for Best Music Direction (1993, 1997, 2002 & 2003)
- Yuvan Shankar Raja (1979–), composer, singer, winner of Cyprus International Film Festival Award in 2006 for Raam
- Harris Jayaraj (1975–), composer
- Kavita Krishnamurti (1958–), singer
- D. Imman (1983–), composer, singer
- Srikanth Deva, composer, singer
- Bobo Shashi, composer, singer
- Karthik Raja (1973–), composer
- Bharadwaj (1960–), composer, singer
- G. V. Prakash Kumar (1987–), composer, singer, actor
- Vijay Antony (1975–), composer, singer, actor
- Anirudh Ravichander (1990–), composer, singer
- James Vasanthan, composer
- Santhosh Narayanan (1983–), composer
- Mohamaad Ghibran (1980–), composer
- Joshua Sridhar (2004–), composer
- Nivas K. Prasanna (2014–), composer

=== Western music ===
- Master Dhanraj, Mentor of Ilaiyaraaja and A. R. Rahman
- Guy Sebastian, Malaysian-Australian singer and songwriter
- M.I.A. (Mathangi "Maya" Arulpragasam), British musician
- Solé, American rapper
- Sketchy Bongo (Yuvir Pillay), South African musician and DJ
- Clarence Jey (Clarence Jeyaretnam), Sri Lankan American record producer
- Yogi B (Yogeswaran Veerasingam), Malaysian hiphop artist, founder of Poetic Ammo
- Kamahl (Kandiah Kamalesvaran), Australian cabaret/easy listening singer
- Tharini Mudaliar, Australian singer and violinist
- Tommy Genesis, Canadian rapper
- Shan Vincent de Paul, Canadian singer-songwriter, Rapper
- Jacintha Abisheganaden, Singaporean singer
- Rudra, Singaporean death metal band
- Shruti Haasan, western singer, daughter of Tamil actor Kamal Haasan
- Blaaze, rap artist and playback singer
- Lord Kossity
- Siva Kaneswaran, band member of The Wanted
- Arjun Coomaraswamy, UK R&B singer
- Dinesh Kanagaratnam, Sri Lankan hiphop artist
- Hiphop Tamizha, Tamil rap duo
- Vidya Vox, American singer
- Yanchan, Canadian music artist
- Priya Ragu, Swiss singer
- Shruthi Rajasekar, American composer and singer
- Rhea Raj, American singer-songwriter
- Lara Raj, American singer- Member of Katseye
- Janani K. Jha, American singer-songwriter, producer, Reality TV contestant

=== Other ===
- Jaclyn Victor, Malaysian singer, winner of inaugural Malaysian Idol
- Chen Gexin, Chinese songwriter
- Chen Gang, Chinese composer
- Lydian Nadhaswaram, child prodigy, Indian pianist, winner of The World's Best, 2019
- Ashan Pillai, Sri Lankan born British violist and professor

== Dance ==
- T. Balasaraswati
- Chitra Visweswaran
- Padma Subramanyam
- Rukmini Devi Arundale
- Anita Ratnam
- Vyjayanthimala
- Rajee Narayan

== Cinema ==
=== Directors ===
- Thangar Bachan
- C. V. Sridhar
- A. P. Nagarajan
- A. C. Tirulokchandar
- K. Balachander
- Balu Mahendra
- Mahendran
- Bharathiraja
- A. L. Vijay
- A. Bhimsingh
- S. P. Muthuraman
- S. A. Chandrasekhar
- Liaquat Ali Khan
- Bhagyaraj
- T. Rajendar
- P. Vasu
- Lenin M. Sivam
- Suresh Krissna
- K. S. Ravikumar
- Mani Ratnam
- S. Shankar
- Nelson Dilipkumar
- Vetrimaaran
- Atlee
- Lokesh Kanagaraj
- AR Murugadoss
- V. Z. Durai
- Seenu Ramasamy
- Bharathan
- Selvaraghavan
- Thiagarajan Kumararaja
- Bala
- Karthik Subbaraj
- Nalan Kumarasamy
- Gautham Vasudev Menon (half Malayali)
- Mohan Raja
- Vasanthabalan
- Ram
- S. J. Surya
- R. Ajay Gnanamuthu
- Karthick Naren
- Kamal Haasan
- Balaji Sakthivel
- K. V. Anand
- P. C. Sreeram
- Jeeva
- Vijay Milton
- Dharani
- Hari
- Ameer Sultan
- Agathian
- S. P. Jananathan
- Tamiliam Subas
- Mysskin
- Prabu Solomon
- Pandiraj
- Siruthai Siva
- Pa. Ranjith
- Samuthirakani
- Sasikumar
- Sasi
- R. K. Selvamani
- Ezhil
- Saran
- Prabhu Deva
- Chimbu Deven
- Silambarasan
- Suseenthiran
- Venkat Prabhu
- Vikraman

=== Actors ===
- Gemini Ganesan
- Kamal Haasan
- Suriya
- Silambarasan
- Joseph Vijay
- R. Madhavan
- Saravanan
- Sivaji Ganesan
- Jayam Ravi (half tamil)
- Arun Vijay
- Harish Kalyan
- Siddharth
- Karthi
- Vijay Sethupathi
- Sivakarthikeyan
- Vadivelu
- Goundamani
- Senthil
- Ramarajan
- Chitti Babu
- Vivek
- Santhanam
- Sathyaraj
- Shaam
- Sathish
- Sibi Sathyaraj
- Vikram
- M. K. Thyagaraja Bhagavathar
- N. S. Krishnan
- P. U. Chinnappa
- M. K. Mustafa
- T. R. Mahalingam
- Yogi Babu
- Manivannan
- Thengai Srinivasan
- Manobala
- Mansoor Ali Khan
- Vennira Aadai Moorthy
- Karunas
- Delhi Ganesh
- Singamuthu
- Kumarimuthu
- Vinu Chakravarthy
- Vijay Antony
- G. V. Prakash Kumar
- T. Rajendar
- Sam Anderson
- Prashanth Thyagarajan, half Tamil

=== Actresses ===
- Trisha (actress)
- Nivetha Pethuraj
- Shruti Haasan, half Tamil
- Menaka (actress)
- Keerthy Suresh, half Tamil
- Priya Anand, half Tamil
- Regina Cassandra
- Priyamani
- Rekha, half Tamil
- Sridevi, half Tamil
- Priya Bhavani Shankar
- Losliya Mariyanesan
- Vyjanthimala
- Madhoo
- Meenakshi Seshadri
- Vidya Balan,
- Riythvika
- Suhasini Maniratnam
- Hema Malini
- Esha Deol, half Tamil
- Priyanka Arul Mohan, half Tamil
- Indhuja Ravichandran
- Janani (actress)
- Amritha Aiyer
- Ramya Krishnan
- Sai Dhanshika

=== Music composers ===
See: Film music

- A. R. Rahman
- Anirudh Ravichander
- Yuvan Shankar Raja
- Ilaiyaraaja
- G. V. Prakash Kumar
- Harris Jayaraj
- D. Imman
- Ghibran
- Vivek-Mervin
- Santhosh Narayanan
- Justin Prabhakaran
- Gangai Amaran
- Deva (composer)
- Sam C. S.
- Vijay Antony
- Darbuka Siva
- Sean Roldan
- Sai Abhyankkar

=== In Hollywood ===
- Sendhil Ramamurthy, actor in NBC drama Heroes and Netflix series Never Have I Ever; half Tamil
- Ashok Amritraj, filmmaker, producer
- Geraldine Viswanathan, actress from Blockers (film); half Tamil
- Sunkrish Bala, actor in ABC show Notes from the Underbelly
- Mindy Kaling, actor in NBC sitcom The Office; half Tamil
- Aziz Ansari, actor and comedian
- Poorna Jagannathan, actress in Netflix series Never Have I Ever
- Chandran Rutnam, award-winning director for the movie A Common Man at the Madrid International Film Festival; half Tamil.
- M. Night Shyamalan, director; half Tamil
- Maitreyi Ramakrishnan, a Canadian actress in Netflix series Never Have I Ever
- Selva Rasalingam, actor; half Tamil
- Nimmi Harasgama, actress in Funny Boy (2020 film); half Tamil
- Amara Karan, actress in The Darjeeling Limited
- Simone Ashley, actress in Bridgerton
- Charithra Chandran, actress in Bridgerton

=== Other entertainers ===
- Padma Lakshmi, American model and television host
- Angela Jonsson, Icelandic model and actress
- Amelia Henderson, British-Malaysian media personality
- Anjana Vasan, British-Singaporean actress
- Law Lan, Hong Kong actress
- Cassandra Ponti, Filipino actress
- Tatiana Kumar, French-Malaysian model
- Huzir Sulaiman, Malaysian director and actor
- Waheeda Rehman, Indian actress and dancer
- Michelle Saram, Chinese-Singaporean actress and singer
- Romesh Ranganathan, British comedian
- Sindhu Vee, British stand-up comedian; half Tamil
- Aurore Kichenin, French model
- Deborah Priya Henry, Malaysian-Irish model and television personality

== Sports and games ==
=== Athletics ===
- Mariyappan Thangavelu, winner of the gold medal in Paralympics, high jump
- Santhi Soundarajan, first World Peace Sports Festival Ambassador from India; first Tamil woman to win a medal at Asian Games
- Mani Jegathesan
- Sathish Sivalingam
- Gomathi Marimuthu, winner of the gold medal in Asian athletics championship
- Vithya Ramraj, India's fastest woman athlete

=== Basketball ===
- Anitha Pauldurai, basketball player

=== Boxing ===
- Venkatesan Devarajan was the second Indian to win a medal at the Boxing World Cup after Pu Zoramthanga (boxer), from Mizoram. He is from Chennai, India. He was awarded the Arjuna Award in 1995. He competed in the men's bantamweight event at the 1992 Summer Olympics. V. Devarajan has been a fighter on and off the boxing ring. He broke new ground by becoming the first Indian to win a World Cup medal on foreign soil in 1994.
- Kalaivani Srinivasan is a female boxer from Tamil Nadu who won a silver medal at the Indian Seniors National Boxing Championship in Vijayanagar in 2019. She was named the ‘Most Promising Boxer’ at the Indian National Boxing Championship in 2019. She later won a gold medal at the South Asian Games in Kathmandu, Nepal in 2019.

=== Carrom ===
- A. Maria Irudayam, world carrom champion and Arjuna Award winner for carrom (1996)
- R. Arokiaraj, carrom champion

=== Volleyball ===
- A. Palanisamy, first Arjuna Award winner for volleyball (1961)
- G. E. Sridharan, Arjuna Award winner
- Sivabalan, played for India and currently playing for IOB, Chennai

=== Chess ===
- Viswanathan Anand, world chess champion; first Indian to earn the title of Grandmaster
- Manuel Aaron, first Indian to earn the title of International Master
- Murugan Thiruchelvam, chess player from United Kingdom
- Krishnan Sasikiran, Grandmaster and Arjuna Award winner for chess (2002)
- S. Vijayalakshmi, six-time women's national champion of India; first woman Grandmaster from India; Arjuna Award winner for chess (2000)
- Aarthie Ramaswamy, woman Grandmaster and under-18 girls' world chess champion
- Baskaran Adhiban, chess Grandmaster from Tamil Nadu
- S. P. Sethuraman, chess Grandmaster from Tamil Nadu
- Srinath Narayanan, Chess Grandmaster From Tamil Nadu
- Rameshbabu Praggnanandhaa, Chess Grandmaster From Tamil Nadu
- Bodhana Sivanandan https://en.wikipedia.org/w/index.php?title=Bodhana_Sivanandan&oldid=1357017438 - at age ten, she became the youngest chess player to earn a Woman Grandmaster norm

=== Cricket ===
==== India ====
- M.J. Gopalan (1909–2003), represented India in both international field hockey and cricket
- C. R. Rangachari (1916–1993), pace bowler, Indian Cricket Team
- M. Suryanarayan (1930–2010), batsman, Indian Test cricketer
- C. D. Gopinath (1930–), batsman, Indian Cricket Team
- Ravichandran Ashwin, all rounder, Indian Cricket Team
- S. Venkataraghavan (1945–), ex-Captain of Indian Cricket Team and Test and ODI umpire
- K. Srikkanth (1959–), ex-Captain and current Chief Selector of Indian Cricket Team
- T. A. Sekhar (1956–), pace bowler, Indian Cricket Team
- Thiru Kumaran (1975–), pace bowler, Indian Cricket Team
- T.E. Srinivasan, batsman, Indian Cricket Team
- L. Sivaramakrishnan (1965–), spin bowler, Indian Cricket Team
- Margasahayam Venkataramana (1966–), test cricketer, off-spinner
- V. B. Chandrasekhar, batsman, Indian Cricket Team
- Bharat Arun (1962–), pace bowler, Indian Cricket Team
- Murali Kartik (1976–), spin bowler, Indian Cricket Team, Kolkata Knight Riders, Pune Warriors
- Sadagoppan Ramesh (1975–), batsman, Indian Cricket Team
- Subramaniam Badrinath (1980–), batsman, Indian Cricket Team, Chennai Super Kings
- Murali Vijay (1984–), batsman, Indian Cricket Team, Chennai Super Kings
- Lakshmipathy Balaji (1981–), pace bowler, Indian Cricket Team, Chennai Super Kings, Kolkata Knight Riders
- Dinesh Karthik (1985–), wicketkeeper, Indian Cricket Team, Delhi Daredevils, Kings XI Punjab, Mumbai Indians
- Washington Sundar (1999–), all-rounder, Indian Cricket Team, Royal Challengers Bangalore
- Thangarasu Natarajan, pacer From Salem Tamil Nadu
- Varun Chakravarthy, spinner
- Murugan Ashwin, leg spinner
- Venkatesh Iyer, Batsman

==== Other countries ====
- Muttiah Muralitharan (1972–), highest wicket taker in test and ODI cricket from Sri Lanka
- Angelo Mathews, Sri Lankan all rounder and captain
- Russel Arnold, Sri Lankan cricketer and journalist
- Roy Dias, former Sri Lankan test cricketer/vice captain; a Tamil of Negombo Chetty
- Sridharan Jeganathan (?–1996), former NCC and Sri Lankan test cricketer/off spin bowler; first Sri Lankan test cricketer to die
- Vinodhan John, pace bowler, first Sri Lankan Tamil Test cricketer 1982
- Pradeep Jayaprakashdaran, Sri Lankan One Day International (ODI) cricket player
- S. Illangaratnam, Sri Lankan cricketer, stalwart of Moratuwa and Bloomfield cricket clubs prior to the Test era
- Mahadevan Sathasivam, one of the best cricket batsmen produced by Ceylon
- Kandiah Thirugnansampandapillai Francis, international Test and ODI umpire from Sri Lanka
- Nasser Hussain (1968–), former Essex and England cricketer, test captain
- Sanjayan Thuraisingam (1969–), pace bowler, Canadian Cricket Team
- Alvin Kallicharan, former West Indies Guyana cricket captain
- Mahendra Nagamootoo, former West Indies and Guyana cricketer, nephew of Alvin Kallicharan
- Veerasammy Permaul, West Indies and Guyana cricketer

=== Football ===
- Gurusamy Kandasamy, plays for Malaysia.
- Nishan Velupillay, half Sri Lankan Tamil, plays for Australia.
- Peter Velappan (1935–2018), General Secretary of Asian Football Confederation; member of FIFA Strategic Studies Committee & Organising Committee for the FIFA World Cup. Played for Malayasia.
- Samuel Moutoussamy, professional footballer who plays as a midfielder for FC Nantes and represents the DR Congo internationally, half Tamil.
- Syed Sabir Pasha, represented Indian football team in the early 1990s; also played for and coached Indian Bank-Chennai
- Vimal Yoganathan, First Tamil Professional Footballer in England. He's of Sri Lankan Tamil Heritage, plays for Wales U19s internationally. Plays for Oldham Athletic (on loan from Barnsley FC)

=== Hockey ===
- Vasudevan Baskaran, captain of the Indian hockey team that won Olympic Gold in 1980 Moscow Olympics; Arjuna Award winner (1979–1980)
- Dhanraj Pillay (1968–), ex-Indian hockey team Captain, Arjuna Award winner (1995); winner of Rajiv Gandhi Khel Ratna Award (1999–2000)
- Adam Sinclair, member of the Indian hockey team at the 2004 Athens Olympics

=== Mountain climbing ===
- M. Magendran, conquered the highest peak in the world, Mount Everest

=== Racing ===
- Karun Chandhok, Formula 1 driver
- Naren Kumar, four time National Rally Champion
- Ajith Kumar, mechanic, F2 racer, Moto gp racer

=== Squash ===
- Nicol David, former world number 1
- Joshna Chinappa, Indian women Squash Champion

=== Tennis ===
- Vijay Amritraj, international champion and actor
- Anand Amritraj, international player
- Ashok Amritraj, international player
- Prakash Amritraj, international player
- Ramanathan Krishnan, international player
- Ramesh Krishnan, international player
- Nirupama Vaidyanathan, international player

== Entertainers ==
- Vyjayanthimala, Bharatanatyam dancer; introduced semi-classical dance in Bollywood
- Rukmini Devi Arundale, Bharatanatyam dancer; founder of Kalakshetra
- Balasaraswati, Bharatanatyam dancer
- Alarmel Valli, Bharatanatyam dancer
- Chitra Visweswaran, Bharatanatyam dancer
- Padma Subramanyam, Bharatanatyam dancer
- Pithukuli Murugadas, musician
- Tameem Ahmed, influencer
- Avinaas Indrakumar, influencer
- K. B. Sundarambal, actress and singer
- Sirkazhi Govindarajan, vocalist and Carnatic music exponent
- Dr.Sirkazhi G. Sivachidambaram, vocalist and Carnatic music exponent

== Religion and spirituality ==
- Bodhidharma (5th/6th century), Buddhist monk and 28th patriarch of Buddhism; traditionally credited as the leading patriarch and transmitter of Zen to China; spread Shaolin Kung Fu in China
- Ayya Vaikundar (1809–1851), founder and preceptor of the Ayyavazhi sect
- Ramalinga Swamigal (1823–1873), popularly known as Vallalar
- Ramanuja (1017–1137), philosopher and saint of Vaishnavism
- Iyothee Thass, Buddhist philosopher and activist
- Bawa Muhaiyaddeen, Sufi mystic

== Tamil literature ==
=== Classical literature ===
- Tholkappiar, author of the Tholkappiyam
- Thiruvalluvar, poet and author of the Tirukkuṛaḷ
- Tirumular, poet and author of Tirumantiram
- Kambar, author of Ramavataram
- Avvaiyar, author of Ātticcūṭi
- Eelattu Poothanthevanar, classical Sri Lankan poet of the Sangam period

=== Religious literature ===
==== Shaivism ====
- Sekkilhar, author of the Periya Puranam
- Manikkavasagar, author of Thiruvasagam and one of the Nayanmars
- Siva Prakasar, author of Nanneri
- Thirumular, author of Tirumantiram
- Nakkeerar author of Tirumurukāṟṟuppaṭai
- Arunagirinathar, author of Tiruppugal

==== Vaishnavism ====
- Nammalvar, author of Tiruvaymoli and one of the Alvars
- Tirumalisai Alvar, author of Tiruchanda Viruttam and one of the Alvars
- Andal, author of Tiruppavai and one of the Alvars
- Manavala Mamunigal, proponent of Sri Vaishnavism
- Periyalvar, author of Periyalvar Tirumoli and one of the Alvars
- V. Akilesapillai, scholar, poet, and author of Thirukonasala Vaipavam from Sri Lanka

==== Islam ====
- Umaru Pulavar (1605–1703), author of Seerappuranam, Islamic tamil poet.

==== Jainism ====
- Illango Adigal, poet and author of Silappathikaram
- Tirutakakatevar, author of Jivaka Chintamani
- Mandalapuruder, author of Vira Mandalaver is Sudamani Nigandhu
- Svarupananda Desikar

=== Christianity ===
- Henry Alfred Krishnapillai, author of Ratchanya Yaatrigam, the Masterpiece based on John Bunyan's The Pilgrim's Progress, although not a translation.

=== Modern literature ===
==== India ====
- Subramania Bharati, social and literary writer
- Bharathidasan (1891–1964), poet and rationalist
- Pattukkottai Kalyanasundaram, wrote revolutionary Tamil poems in common language
- Pudhumaipithan (1906–1948), fiction writer
- Samuel Vedanayagam Pillai, first Tamil novelist
- Akilan, novelist
- Ramalingam Pillai
- Thi. Janakiraman, novelist
- Mahavidwan Vasudeva Mudaliar, scholar
- Kalki Krishnamurthy (1899–1954), novelist and journalist
- Jayakanthan (1934–2015), writer and novelist
- G. P. Rajarathnam (1909–1979), Tamil-born Kannada poet and writer
- T. P. Kailasam (1884–1946), playwright and writer in Kannada literature from Karnataka
- Masti Venkatesha Iyengar (1891–1986), Kannada writer and recipient of Jnanpith Award
- Kannadasan (1927–1981), popularly called as Kavi Arasu; poet and film lyricist; winner of National Film Award for Best Lyrics (1969)
- Vairamuthu (1953–), poet and film lyricist; winner of National Film Award for Best Lyrics (1986, 1993, 1995, 2000, and 2003)
- Leena Manimekalai
- Indira Soundarajan, novelist and short story writer
- Ashoka Mitran (1931–2017), novelist and short story writer
- R. K. Narayan (1906–2001), English novelist and essayist
- Makaral Karthikeya Mudaliar, scholar
- Pa. Subramania Mudaliar, scholar
- Varadarasanar, novelist
- Sandilyan, novelist
- Pa. Vijay, film lyricist; winner of National Film Award for Best Lyrics (2005)
- Vaali, film lyricist
- Sujatha (1935–2008), novelist, haiku poet, film screenplay writer
- R. Raghava Iyengar
- K. S. Maniam
- Kavikko Abdul Rahman
- Makkal Pavalar Inqulab, left-leaning poet
- Mu. Metha
- Ka. Mu. Sheriff, film lyricist
- Manushyaputhiran
- Rajathi Salma, novelist
- Balakumaran (5 July 1946 – 15 May 2018)[1], Indian Tamil writer, author of over 200 novels, 100 short stories, etc.
- Pattukkottai Prabakar, Indian Tamil writer. He is a king of crime and thrill novels and also a versatile writer.
- Rajesh Kumar (writer), pseudonym of KR Rajagopal, Tamil author of crime fiction. Kalaimaamani Awardee.
- Henry Alfred Krishnapillai, Tamil Poet.

==== Other countries ====
- Ronnie Govender, South African playwright, actor, activist, won the 1997 Commonwealth Writers' Prize
- Pico Iyer, British-Japanese essayist and novelist
- Kessie Govender, South African playwright, actor and theatre director; founded the Stable Theatre
- Kandappu Murugesu, Sri Lankan poet
- Shyam Selvadurai, Sri Lankan-Canadian novelist; half Tamil
- Sharon Bala, Canadian writer
- Akwaeke Emezi, Nigerian writer and video artist; half Tamil
- Rani Manicka, Malaysian novelist, won the Commonwealth Writers' Prize in 2003 for South East Asia and South Pacific region
- Edwin Thumboo, Singaporean writer; half Tamil
- T. K. Doraiswamy (Nakulan) (1921–2007), poet, novelist, translator, professor of English Singapore writer; President of Singapore Law Society
- Gopal Baratham (1935–2002), Singaporean writer and neurosurgeon

=== Others ===
- Arumuka Navalar (1822–1879), pioneer of Tamil prose; champion of Hinduism from Jaffna, Sri Lanka
- Siva prakasar, Saiva Siddantha, scholar, wrote 32 books in Tamil (Nanneri, Thiruchendur ula)
- Maraimalai Adigal, scholar and activist
- U. V. Swaminatha Iyer (1855–1942)
- Paventhar Bharathidasan, poet, also known as "Puratchi Kavignar"
- Kalyanasundara Mudaliar, writer
- Varadarasanar, novelist
- Erode Tamilanban, poet
- Solomon Pappaiah, scholar and debate judge
- Pudhumaipithan, revolutionary writer from the Tirunelveli Saiva Pillai community
- Jayakanthan, writer
- Kavimani Desigavinayagam Pillai, poet
- Manonmaniam Sundaram Pillai, writer
- Perumal Rasu, writer, poet, painter
- Ramanuja Kavirayar, poet

== Modern art ==
- S. Chandrasekaran, nominated for the APBF Signature Art Prize 2008 as one of the top ten
- Vivian Sundaram, Indian Jewish contemporary artist
- Manohar Devadoss, 2020 Padma Shri recipient

== See also ==
- Tamil people
- Tamil diaspora
- List of Sri Lankan Tamils
- Tamil Canadian
- Tamil American
- Tamil Malaysians
- British Tamil
- Tamil Australian
- Tamil Indonesians
- Tamil South Africans
- Tamil Germans
- Tamils in France
- Tamil Mauritian
