= Govender =

Govender is a surname of Indian origin, from Gounder, found among Indian South Africans. Notable people with the surname include:

- Karthy Govender, South African human rights commissioner and academic
- Kessie Govender (1942–2002), South African playwright and actor
- Maggie Govender, South African politician
- Pregs Govender, South African activist
- Rogers Govender (born 1960), Church of England dean
- Ronnie Govender (1934–2021), South African playwright and writer
- Venitia Govender, South African activist
