= List of educational institutions in Tiruvarur district =

This is a list of the schools and colleges in Tiruvarur district.

- A.R.J College of Engineering and Technology
- Central University of Tamil Nadu
- Sri Sankara Matriculation Higher Secondary School
