= Ravichandran =

Ravichandran is an Indian name. Notable people with the name include:

- Ravichandran (Tamil actor) (1942–2011)
- Ravichandran (Tamil film director) (born 1971)
- N. Ravichandran (professor) (1955), professor at IIM Ahmedabad
- N. Ravichandran, Indian business magnate
- Ravichandran Ashwin (born 1986), Indian cricketer
- Ravichandran (Kannada actor) (born 1961), film actor, director and producer
- V. Ravichandran (active since 1997), Tamil film producer
- Govindasamy Ravichandran, Indian fisherman and former participant of a murder case in Singapore
