= A. Jeyaratnam Wilson =

Sri Lankan Tamil academic, historian and author

- Born: 1928
- Died: 31 May 2000 (aged 71); Toronto, Ontario, Canada
- Education: Royal College, Colombo; London School of Economics
- Occupation: Academic

Alfred Jeyaratnam Wilson (Tamil: அல்பிரட் ஜெயரத்தினம் வில்சன் 1928 – 31 May 2000) was a Sri Lankan Tamil academic, historian and author. He began his academic career as a lecturer in economics and political science at the University of Ceylon and was the founding professor of political science at the University of Ceylon (1969-72). Later he moved to Canada and was professor of political science at the University of New Brunswick.

== Early life and family ==
Wilson was born in 1928 in Colombo, Sri Lanka. He was educated at Royal College, Colombo. He gained a B.A. in Economics and Political Science (1950) from the University of Ceylon, a Ph.D (1956) from the London School of Economics, and a DSc (1977) in Economics.

Wilson married Susili, daughter of S. J. V. Chelvanayakam. They had two daughters (Malliha and Maithili) and one son (Kumanan).

== Career ==
Wilson spent a short time as an editorial writer for the Ceylon Daily News. He then taught at the University of Ceylon in Peradeniya for 20 years from 1952 to 1972. He was founding chair of political science at the university in 1969. After Peradeniya Wilson taught political science at the Fredericton campus of the University of New Brunswick (UNB) between 1970 and 1994. After retirement he served as an emeritus professor at the UNB.

Whilst teaching at Peradeniya and UNB Wilson took a number of sabbaticals. He was Leverhulme Research Scholar at the London School of Economics (1955), research fellow in politics at the University of Leicester (1964–65), research associate at McGill University (1970–71), Simon Senior Fellow at the University of Manchester (1971–72), senior research associate at Columbia University (1977) and senior associate member at St Antony's College, Oxford (1977).

Wilson was a constitutional advisor to President J. R. Jayewardene between 1978 and 1983. He was a consultant on South Asia for the State Department. He also worked for the Canadian International Development Agency (CIDA), Canadian Refugees Advisory Board, Ministry of Multiculturalism and immigration tribunals in the USA. He served on the editorial boards of The Round Table, The Journal of Commonwealth and Comparative Politics, The Ceylon Journal of Historical and Social Studies, Asian Survey and The Parliamentarian.

== Death ==
Wilson passed in his sleep of heart failure at his home in Toronto on 31 May 2000. His funeral took place on 3 June 2000.

== Works ==
Wilson wrote and edited nine books and numerous academic essays and reviews.

- An Introduction to Civics and Government (1954)
- Politics in Sri Lanka, 1947–1973 (1974, Macmillan)
- Electoral Politics in an Emergent State: the Ceylon General Election of May 1970 (1975, Cambridge University Press)
- The Gaullist System in Asia (1980, Macmillan)
- The States of South Asia: Problems of National Integration : Essays in honour of W.H. Morris-Jones (1982, Hurst)
- The Break-up of Sri Lanka: The Sinhalese-Tamil Conflict (1988, Hurst)
- S. J. V. Chelvanayakam and the Crisis of Sri Lankan Tamil Nationalism, 1947–1977: a Political Biography (1994, University of Hawaii Press)
- Sri Lankan Tamil Nationalism: Its Origins and Development in the 19th and 20th Centuries co-authored with A. J. V. Chandrakanthan, (2000, Hurst)
- The Post-Colonial States of South Asia: Democracy, Development and Identity (2001, Palgrave)
