= Tattuvarayar =

Tattuvarayar was an ascetic scholar and disciple of Svarupananda Desikar in the late 14th century - early 15th century time. He composed an anthology of verses on the Advaita philosophy called Kurundirattu containing about 1400 verses around the same time his guru (teacher) wrote an anthology. Tattuvarayar is also known for his many devotional songs and poems, famous among which are the Paduturai, Nanavinodan Kalambakam, Mohavadaip-parani and Annavadaipparani.
