= Malliha Wilson =

Tamil Canadian lawyer

Assistant Deputy Attorney General of Ontario
- In office April 2008 – November 2016

Personal details
- Born: November 5, 1959 (age 66) Colombo, Sri Lanka
- Relatives: Alfred Jeyaratnam Wilson (father); Susili Wilson (mother); S. J. V. Chelvanayakam (grandfather)
- Education: McGill University * Osgoode Hall Law School
- Occupation: Lawyer

Malliha Wilson is a Tamil Canadian lawyer who served as an Assistant Deputy Attorney General of the Government of Ontario from April 2008 to November 2016.

Wilson formerly served as senior counsel at the law firm Nava Wilson LLP in Toronto, Ontario.

She was formerly special legal advisor at the Investment Management Corporation of Ontario (IMCO). She specializes in human rights, Indigenous, constitutional, corporate and labour law, and other complex litigation.

== Early life and family ==
Wilson's father, Professor Alfred Jeyaratnam Wilson, was a Sri Lankan Tamil academic, historian and author.

Wilson's grandfather, S. J. V. Chelvanayakam, was a Ceylon Tamil lawyer, politician and Member of Parliament. He was the founder and leader of the Illankai Tamil Arasu Kachchi (ITAK) and Tamil United Liberation Front (TULF) and a political leader of the Ceylon Tamil community for more than two decades.

She has two siblings, Maithili and Kumanan. She is married to Helder Travassos, and has a daughter (Melanie).

== Education ==
Wilson completed her undergraduate degree at the McGill University in Montreal, Quebec. She completed her law degree at Osgoode Hall Law School at York University in Toronto, Ontario in 1981.

== Career ==
Wilson began her career in the Ontario Public Service in 1987 after being called to the bar in 1983. She first joined the Counsel for the Ministry of Government Services in 1987 and served as counsel in the newly formed Native Affairs Secretariat for Ontario.

From 2000 to 2004, she served as the legal director for the Ministry of Labour, from 2004 to 2008 as the director of the Crown Law Office-Civil, and then became the assistant deputy attorney general, Civil Law Division. Upon concluding an eight-year term in that role, Wilson became special legal advisor at the Investment Management Corporation of Ontario.

In 2009, she received the South Asian Bar Association's Distinguished Career Award. In 2012, her alma mater, Osgoode Hall Law School, awarded her a Gold Key Award for the Public Sector. In 2015 the Federation of Asian Canadian Lawyers awarded her the Lawyer of Distinction Award.

After her time at the Ministry of the Attorney General of Ontario, Wilson transferred to the Investment Management Corporation of Ontario in November 2016 to work as special legal advisor.

She co-founded Nava Wilson LLP, a Toronto-based law firm, in 2017.

She currently serves on the Principal's Advisory Group at the University of Toronto Scarborough.

== Supreme Court of Canada cases ==
=== Notable cases ===
Wilson has appeared before the Supreme Court of Canada on the following cases:

- Carter v. Canada, 2016 SCC 4
- John Doe v Ontario (Finance), 2014 SCC 36
- Bruno Appliance and Furniture, Inc v Hryniak, 2014 SCC 8
- Ontario (Minister of Finance) v. Ontario (Information and Privacy Commissioner), 2014 SCC 36
- Grassy Narrows First Nations v. Ontario (Natural Resources), 2014 SCC 48
- Her Majesty the Queen v Criminal Lawyers' Association of Ontario, 2013 SCC 43
- Penner v Niagara (Regional Police Services Board), 2013 SCC 19
- Antrim Truck Centre Ltd v Ontario (Transportation), 2013 SCC 13
- Lax Kw'alaams Indian Band v Canada (Attorney General), 2011 SCC 56*
- R v Imperial Tobacco Canada Ltd, 2011 SCC 42
- Phillion v. Ontario (Attorney General), 2014 CarswellOnt 14330
- Kenneth Hill v. Brittany Beaver, 2020 Carswell Ont 455
- Tercon Contractors Ltd. v. British Columbia (Minister of Transportation & Highways) 2010 SCC 4
- Rio Tinto Alcan Inc. v. Carrier Sekani Tribal Council 2010 SCC 43*
- D. (B.) v. Children's Aid Society of Halton (Region) 2007 SCC 38
- Blank v. Canada (Department of Justice) 2006 SCC 39

== Advocacy ==
Since joining Nava Wilson LLP, Wilson has represented the Tamil Canadian diaspora at the United Nations Human Rights Council (UNHRC) with respect to the crimes against humanity and war crimes that are alleged to have been committed against the Tamils of Sri Lanka during the Civil War. She was a member of the global Tamil diaspora team that was successful in keeping in place United Nations Resolution 40/1 at the UNHRC, which holds the government of Sri Lanka accountable.

In the 2019 Canadian federal elections, Wilson successfully served as a campaign co-chair for Mary Ng, Member of Parliament for the Liberal Party of Canada (Markham-Thornhill), who was re-elected, winning 53.75% of the votes.

Wilson was also elected as the riding chair for the Markham-Thornhill Federal Liberal Association in 2020.
