= Venitia Govender =

Venitia Govender is a South African social justice and human rights activist. She has been involved in the research, lobbying and advocacy, monitoring and challenging the promotion and protection of rights in the Southern African Region for over 20 years. In the 1980s she graduated from the University of Durban-Westville. In the early nineties, during the height of the violence during the transition in South Africa, she co-ordinated the independent violence monitoring organisation, Peace Action. She was the first coordinator of the Police and Prisons Civil Rights Union (POPCRU) and then a legal advisor to Gauteng's Secretariat of Safety and Security.

Venitia spent three years as the National Director of the Human Rights Committee before becoming an independent consultant on human rights, governance and peacebuilding issues, working throughout the Southern African region. During this period she edited quarterly reports on the "state of human rights promotion and protection" in South Africa, as well as a quarterly review on the role and the implementation of mandate of Human rights institutions in Southern Africa. Over the last 10 years Venitia have been involved in re-establishing the solidarity linkages between Zimbabwe and South Africa beyond the bounds of leadership and in this capacity coordinated the Save Zimbabwe Campaign and recently the Swaziland Democracy Campaign.

Over the past 18 years, she has accumulated a diverse and extensive network of contacts and information (both individual and organisational) at the levels of civil society and government in SADC.
