= Great Lakes Institute of Management =

Business School

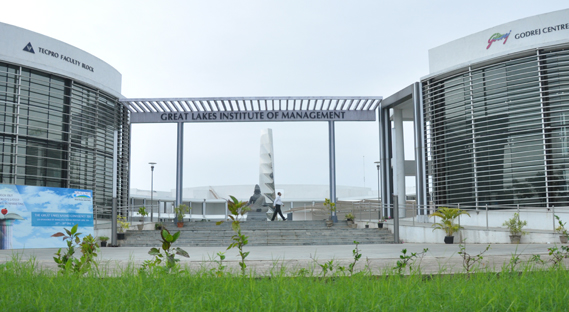
- Great Lakes Chennai Campus
- Motto: Global Mindset - Indian Roots
- Type: Private business school
- Established: 2004; 22 years ago
- Accreditation: AMBA; AACSB; NBA
- Chairman: Mohan Lakhamraju
- Director: Dr. Debashis Sanyal
- Founder: Bala V. Balachandran
- Location: Chennai, Tamil Nadu, India; 12°34′23″N 80°08′20″E
- Campus: 32 acres (13 ha); Suburban
- Nicknames: Great Lakes, GLIM
- Website: www.greatlakes.edu.in
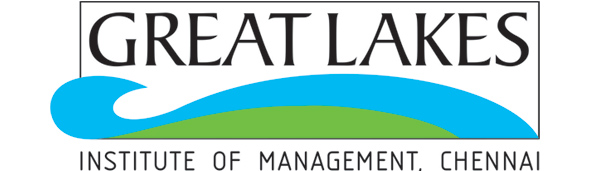

The Great Lakes Institute of Management (also known as Great Lakes or GLIM) is a private business school in India. It was founded in 2004 by Bala V. Balachandran, a professor at Kellogg School of Management with its first campus in Chennai. A second campus was opened in Gurugram later.

Its one year Post-Graduate Program in Management (PGPM) became the first one year full-time management programme to be accredited by India’s higher technical education regulator AICTE in 2008.

== History ==
Great Lakes was set up in 2004 by Bala Balachandran, J.L. Kellogg Distinguished Professor of Accounting and Information Management at Kellogg School of Management, Northwestern University, USA.

Following the establishment of Indian School of Business (ISB), Balachandran wanted to establish a business school in his home state of Tamil Nadu, and set up the Great Lakes Institute of Management in the capital city of Chennai with a model similar to the ISB involving a one year MBA programme, global visiting faculty and international academic collaborations. Since 2012, Great Lakes has also started offering the traditional two-year PGDM programme.

== Accreditation ==
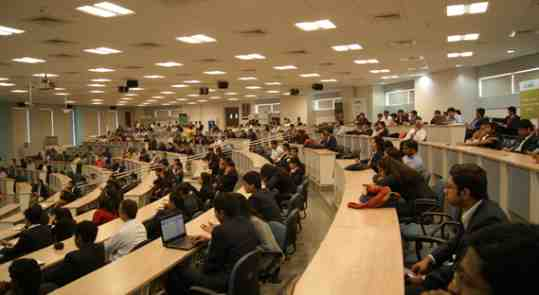
Great Lakes classroom

Great Lakes is accredited by the Association of MBAs (AMBA), UK, one of the three main global accreditation bodies in business education. Great Lakes is the 7th institute in India to get accreditation from the association. Great Lakes Institute of Management, Chennai is accredited by SAQS (South Asian Quality Assurance System).

Great Lakes’ PGPM and PGDM full-time programmes are approved by All India Council for Technical Education (AICTE), a statutory body for technical education, under Ministry of HRD, Govt. of India. Great Lakes’ Chennai campus is a LEED Platinum Rated Green Campus.

In 2023, Great Lakes Chennai attained "Double Crown" status by additionally securing the AACSB accreditation.

== Programs ==
=== Full-Time Courses ===
==== Post Graduate Program in Management (PGPM) ====
This is the Flagship program of Great Lakes Institute of Management. It is a one-year program with rigorous course curriculum. Students applying for this program must have a minimum work experience of two years.

==== Post Graduate Diploma in Management (PGDM) ====
This is a 2-year program designed for young leaders with less than two years of work experience. It is an AICTE approved program, which has clear focus on emerging economies and their growth.

==== Executive Education ====
It is a customized program designed for executives to deliver quantifiable outcomes for their business. Executives from several private and public sectors are given a customized program that helps them with their managerial and leadership skills.

=== Corporate Programs ===
==== Post Graduate Executive Program in Management (PGXPM) ====
This program helps executives who has spent a considerable amount of time in the industry. It helps professionals to developing management competencies and business leadership skills.

==== Post Graduate Program in Management - Flex (PGPM FLEX) ====
The PGPM FLEX program is aimed at working professionals with 2 to 10 years experience. This two-year program helps the executives to pursue the world-class program while giving them the flexibility to continuing their work.

==== Diploma in Business Analytics ====
This program is offered by at the Illinois Institute of Technology, Chicago, in collaboration with Great Lakes Institute of Management, India.

==== Global diploma For Family Enterprises Management ====
The Global Post Graduate Program for Family Enterprise Management is offered in collaboration with Babson College, Massachusetts.

== Rankings ==
Institute rankings

Business/Management – India
- NIRF (2024): 34

Great Lakes Institute of Management was ranked 34 in India by the National Institutional Ranking Framework (NIRF) in the management category in 2024.
