= John Doe v Ontario (Information and Privacy Commissioner) =

- Decided: June 30, 1993

Case opinions
- Majority: CAMPBELL and DUNNET
- Dissent: Southey

In acquitting an accused, Judge Matlow of the Ontario Divisional Court, stated that the four police officers involved in the case had harassed the accused and that they should be charged with fabricating evidence. Matlow sought access to the report of the Ontario Provincial Police exonerating the officers under the Ontario Freedom of Information and Protection of Privacy Act (1987) but was denied access to it by the OPP. Access was later granted by the FIPPA Commissioner.

The Court ruled that the FIPPA Commissioner fundamentally misconstrued the Act in finding that "the presumption in s. 21(3) of an unjustified invasion of personal privacy was subject to rebuttal by the application of a discretionary balancing process under s. 21(2)". The commissioner gave himself a power not granted by the legislation and thereby committed a jurisdictional error in his application of discretionary balancing process (which he did not have). In addition, the FIPPA Commissioner was deemed to decline jurisdiction when s/he failed to mention the results of the Police Complaints Commission investigation, which were inconvenient to the FIPPA judgment.

The application for judicial review of an order of the FIPPA Commissioner by one John Doe (presumably one of the police officers) was allowed, and the publication of the OPP report was banned, in effect by section 21(3) of the FIPPA
