= Central University of Tamil Nadu =

Central university in Thiruvarur, Tamil Nadu, India

- Motto: Relentless pursuit of excellence
- Type: Public
- Established: 2009; 17 years ago
- Accreditation: NAAC
- Academic affiliations: UGC; AIU
- Chancellor: G. Padmanaban
- Vice-Chancellor: Sulochana Shekhar (I/C)
- Visitor: President of India
- Faculty: 161
- Students: 2,100
- Undergraduates: 234
- Postgraduates: 1,568
- Doctoral students: 298
- Location: Thiruvarur, Tamil Nadu, India; 10°48′58″N 79°36′52″E
- Campus: Rural
- Language: English
- Website: cutn.ac.in

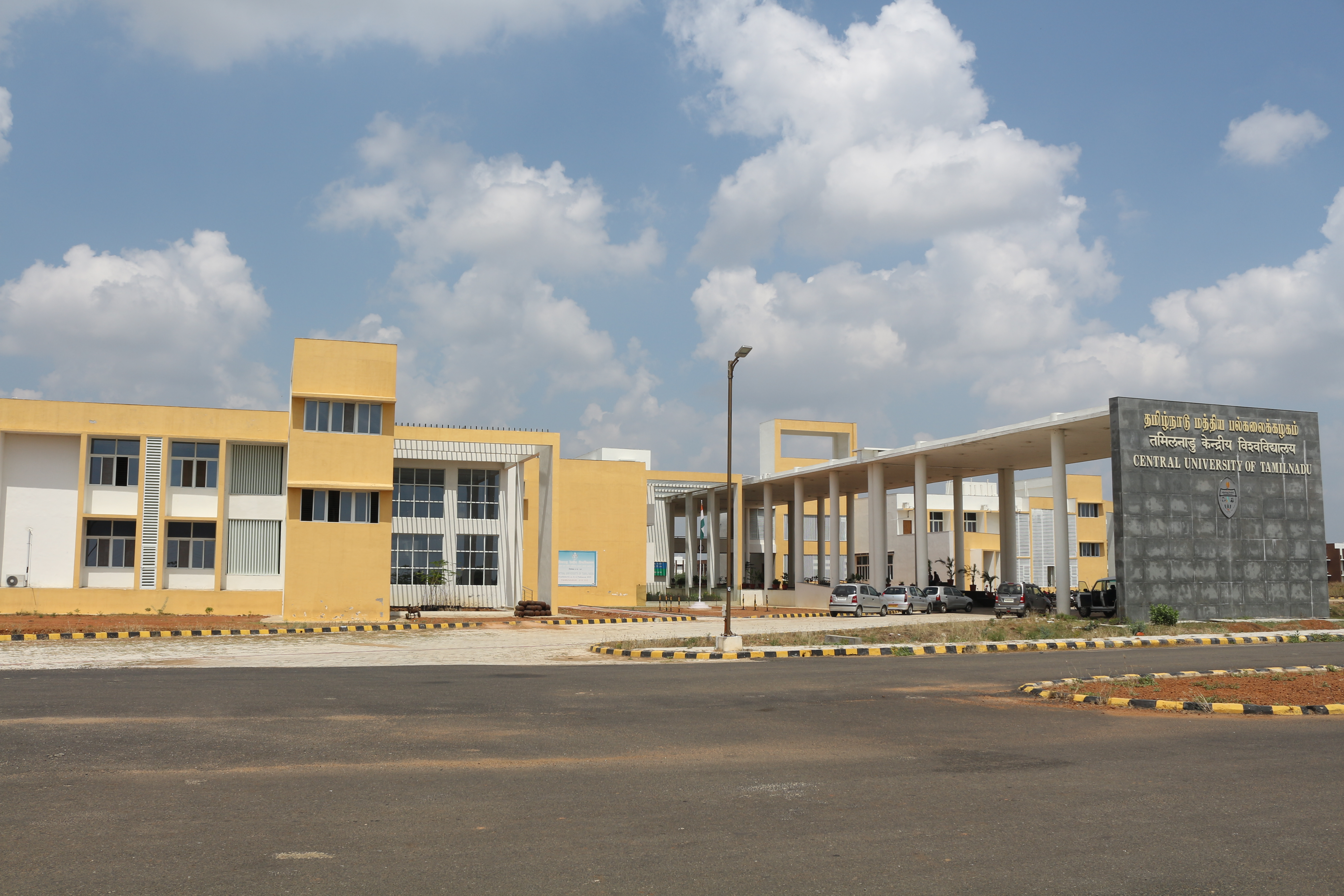
Administrative Block

Central University of Tamil Nadu (CUTN) is a Central University located in Thiruvarur, Tamil Nadu, India. The university has over 2,000 students in 27 Departments under 12 Schools. CUTN was ranked in the 51–100 band among universities in India by the National Institutional Ranking Framework (NIRF) in 2022.

== History ==
CUTN was established by the Government of India in 2009 under the Central Universities Act, 2009. It was inaugurated in September 2009 and B. P. Sanjay was appointed the first Vice-Chancellor (V-C). Aditya Prasad Dash was appointed as the V-C in August 2015.

G. Padmanabhan replaced V. Krishnamurthy as the Chancellor in July 2018. Karpaga Kumaravel replaced Aditya Prasad Dash as acting V-C in August 2020. Prof. M. Krishnan joined as new regular V-C of CUTN on 6 August 2021. With eight students in M.A. English Studies, the university started functioning in November 2009. Now, it offers over 60 programmes. CUTN is spread across 516.76 acres in Thiruvarur.

CUTN had its Academic Campus in the Neelakudi village of Thiruvarur and its Residential Campus in the Nagakudi village. It also has a Community College that offers Certificate, Diploma and Degree programmes.

== List of Schools ==
- School of Basic and Applied Sciences
- School of Behavioural Sciences
- School of Commerce and Business Management
- School of Communication
- School of Earth Sciences
- School of Education and Training
- School of Integrative Biology
- School of Mathematics and Computer Science
- School of Performing Arts and Fine Arts
- School of Social Sciences and Humanities
- School of Technology
- School of Life Sciences
- School of Legal Studies

== List of Departments ==
- Department of Biotechnology
- Department of Physics
- Department of Chemistry
- Department of English Studies
- Department of Tamil
- Department of Economics
- Department of Social Work
- Department of Hindi
- Department of History
- Department of Epidemiology and Public Health
- Department of Microbiology
- Department of Mathematics
- Department of Computer Science
- Department of Applied Psychology
- Department of Commerce
- Department of Management
- Department of Media and Communication
- Department of Library and Information Science
- Department of Education
- Department of Materials Science
- Department of Music
- Department of Law
- Department of Statistics and Applied Mathematics
- Department of Horticulture
- Department of Tourism and Hospital Management
- Department of Geography
- Department of Geology

Department of chemistry

== Ranking ==
University and college rankings

General – India
- NIRF (Universities) (2024): 99

CUTN was ranked 99th among universities in India by the National Institutional Ranking Framework (NIRF) in 2024.
