= Mu. Varadarajan =

Tamil scholar and author

- Born: 25 April 1912; Velam, North Arcot District, Madras Presidency, British India (now in Ranipet District, Tamil Nadu, India)
- Died: 10 October 1974 (aged 62); Madras (now Chennai), Tamil Nadu, India
- Occupations: Professor, Tamil writer
- Children: Arasu, Pari, Nambi
- Relatives: Kumaran Pari M.B.B.S
- Writing career
- Notable awards: Sahitya Akademi Award (1961)

Mu. Varadarajan, also known as Mu. Va. and Varatharasanar, was a Tamil scholar, author and academic from Tamil Nadu, India. He was born in an aristocratic Thuluva Vellala family near Vellore. He was a prolific writer whose published works include 13 novels, 6 plays, 2 short story collections, 11 essay anthologies, a book on the history of Tamil literature, books on Tamil linguistics and children's books. During 1961–71, he was the head of the Tamil department at the University of Madras. In 1961, he was awarded the Sahitya Akademi Award for Tamil for his novel Agal Vilakku. During 1971–74, he was the vice-chancellor of the University of Madurai.

== Bibliography ==
=== Fiction ===
Novels

1. Kallo Kaviyamo
2. Nenjil oru Mul
3. Agal vilakku
4. Karithundu
5. Pertra manam
6. Senthamarai
7. Paavai
8. Andha Naal
9. Malar Vizhi
10. Alli
11. Kayamai
12. Mann kudisai
13. Vada malar

Short stories

1. Ki. pi. 2000
2. Pazhiyum Pavamum
3. Viduthala
4. Kurattai oli

Plays

1. Pachayappar
2. Manachandru
3. Ilango
4. Doctor ali
5. Moondru nadagangal
6. Kadhal enge?

=== Non-fiction ===
Essays

1. Aramum Arasiyalum
2. Arasiyal alaigal
3. Kuruvi por
4. Penmai Vazhga
5. Kuzhandhai
6. Kalvi
7. Mozhi parru
8. Nattu Patru
9. Ulaga peredu
10. Mannin madhippu
11. Nalvazhvu

Literary history

1. History of Tamil literature
2. Tamil nenjam
3. Manal veedu
4. Thiruvalluval or Vazhkai vilakkam
5. Thirukkural Thelivurai
6. Ovacheydhi
7. Kannagi
8. Madhavi
9. Mullai thinai
10. Nedunthogai virundhu
11. Kurunthogai virundhu
12. Narrinai virundhu
13. Ilakkiya araychi
14. Narrinai selvam
15. Kurunthogai selvam
16. Nadaivandi
17. Konguther vazhkai
18. Pulavar kanneer
19. Ilakkiya thiran
20. Ilakkiya Marabu
21. Ilango adigal
22. Ilakkiya Katchikal
23. Kural kattum kadhalar
24. Sanga ilakkiyathil iyarkai

Children's literature

1. Kuzhandhai pattukal
2. Ilaingarkku erra iniya pattugal
3. Padiyathar padum paadu
4. Kannudaya vazhvu

Letter anthologies

1. Annaikku
2. Thambikku
3. Thangaikku
4. Nanbarukku

Travelogues

1. yan kanda ilankai

Linguistics

1. Mozhi nool
2. Mozhiyin kathai
3. Ezhuthin kathai
4. Sollin kathai
5. Mozhi varalaaru
6. Mozhi iyar katturaigal

Biography

1. Aringar Bernard Shaw
2. Gandhi annal
3. Kavingar Tagore
4. Thiru. Vi. Ka.

=== English books ===
1. The Treatment of Nature in Sangam
2. Ilango Adigal

== See also ==
- List of Sahitya Akademi Award winners for Tamil
- List of Indian writers
- List of Tamil-language writers
