= Kandappu Murugesu =

Sri Lankan writer

- Born: 18 June 1926; Karaveddy, Sri Lanka
- Died: 15 February 2004 (aged 77); Karaveddy, Sri Lanka
- Known for: Poet and educationist
- Spouse: Pathini

Kandappu Murugesu (மன்னவன் கந்தப்பு முருகேசு) (18 June 1926 – 15 February 2004), popularly known as Mannavan Master, was born on 18 June 1926, Karaveddy, Jaffna, Sri Lanka. He was a renowned Tamil poet and educationist. He studied under the late eminent Tamil scholar Pandithamani S. Kanapathipillai, who fondly called him "Mannavan". During his lifetime, he won several awards and accolades in poetry competitions and was well known for his eloquence and witty disposition. He is survived by his wife, Pathini, and seven children.
