= Kessie Govender =

- Born: 1942; Durban
- Died: 2002 (aged 59–60)
- Occupations: playwright, actor and theatre director

Kessie Govender (1942 – 2002) was a pioneering voice in South African protest theatre, a playwright, actor and theatre director, who founded the Stable Theatre, a Durban-based theatre company in 1970 and is best known for his plays, Working Class Hero (1979) and The Shack (1979).

== Early life ==
He was born in Durban, KwaZulu-Natal, his grandfather having come to South Africa as a Tamil indentured laborer from India. His father was a bricklayer upon leaving school and then Kessie also took up this trade.

Kessie’s introduction to creative arts happened as a young Shaivite devotee, who participated in local religious tableaus under Guru Subramanian Swamigal the founder of the Saiva Sithanda Sungum in Derby Street Durban.

== Career ==
Govender started writing plays in the 1970s. Over his 30-year career, he wrote, produced, directed and acted in around 15 of his own stage productions, Stable Expense and Working Class Hero being two of his best known pieces. In addition to plays, he also wrote many poems, most of which were directed against the racist socio-political culture of apartheid South Africa.

Later he joined his cousin Ronnie Govender, and Muthal Naidoo in the start up of the Shah Theatre Academy where his natural talent as an actor saw him take centre stage in many lead roles.

In the mid-1970s Govender started his own company, the Stable Theatre, the first independent, black-owned theatre in South Africa. Its first location was on Queen Street, then West Street and it is currently located on Alice Street, in the Durban city centre. Being a builder, Kessie, who was often joined by his brother Shan, renovated the theatre spaces with his own hands, with materials he bought cheaply or managed to scrounge from other worksites. Because the Stable catered to a black audience, and because many of the plays performed at the Stable poked fun at or openly criticized the apartheid system, it was virtually impossible for him to find supporting funds. Ticket sales too were slow in part because those who could not afford to pay were allowed in free. Despite this Kessie’s shows, like Working Class Hero, attracted mixed audiences from affluent and working classes as they both were entertained by sharp dialogue and witty plots that poked fun at their attitudes towards the white minority, each other and the marginalised black majority.

Since its founding, The Stable has been an oasis of cultural diversity and resistance during the Apartheid era. It has helped launch the careers of Ladysmith Black Mambazo’s Joseph Shabalala and playwright Mbongeni Ngema, made famous by his musical Sarafina. Even today, actors, musicians, writers and other members of the performing arts have based themselves there honing their work for local productions and presentations overseas.

In addition to his theatrical pursuits Kessie Govender played a pivotal role in the transformation of his society through various progressive organisations. Among others, he was a founding member of the Natal Cultural Congress, the Chairperson of the Theatre Alliance of Natal, and Executive member of both the Music Alliance of Natal and the Congress of South African Writers.

First produced in 1977, Working Class Hero enjoyed a revival in 2001 at Durban's Natal Playhouse to coincide with the world conference against racism. For this conference, a special edition was published by Stable Creative Arts.

== Other plays (produced) ==
- Stable Expense, 1974
- Tramp –you, Tramp – me, 1975
- Ravanan, 1975
- Working Class Hero, 1976
- The Decision, 1977
- The Shack, 1978
- Ka-goos, 1979
- On the Fence, 1981
- Black Skies, 1984
- Underground, 1988
- Stablexpense, 1991
- I.O.D (Injured On Duty)
- God Made Mosquitoes Too, 1994
- Alternative Action, 1995/6
- Herstory, 1996

== Career accolades ==
- 1994, Made an Honorary Citizen of Louisville, Kentucky (USA) -
- 1994, Invited to recite his own poem at the Inauguration of President Nelson Mandela
- 1989, Awarded the AA Vita Award, for his Lifelong Contribution to the Arts
- 1978, Awarded the Natal Critics Circle Award
- 1968, Awarded the National Drama Foundation: Best Director and Best Actor Award
