= Bala V. Balachandran =

Indian academic (1937–2021)

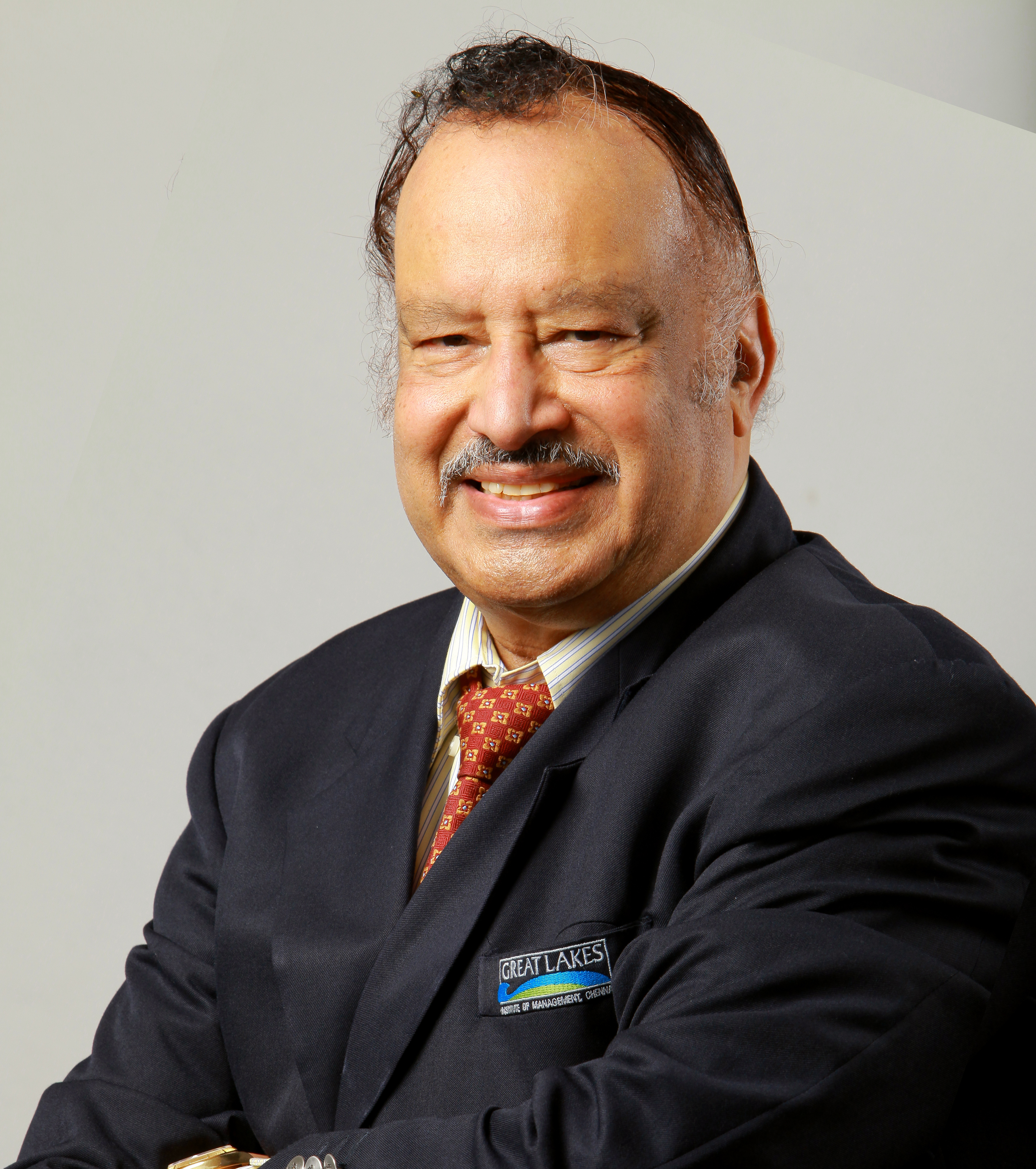
- Prof. Bala V. Balachandran
- Born: 5 July 1937; Pudupatti, Pudukkottai State, British India, (present-day Tamil Nadu, India)
- Died: 27 September 2021 (aged 84); Chicago, Illinois, U.S.
- Other names: Bala, V. Balachandran
- Occupations: Academician, Professor, Entrepreneur
- Known for: Founder, Chairman & Dean Emeritus Great Lakes Institute of Management
- Spouse: Vasantha Balachandran
- Honours: Padma Shri (2001)

Bala V. Balachandran (5 July 1937 – 28 September 2021) was an Indian academic who was Professor Emeritus of Accounting Information & Management at the Kellogg School of Management at Northwestern University. He was also the founder, chairman and dean emeritus of Great Lakes Institute of Management in Chennai, India.

He was a faculty member in Department of Statistics at Annamalai University.

== Early life and education ==
Balachandran was born on 5 July 1937 in Pudupatti, Tamil Nadu (a small village near Pudukottai) into a Tamil family. He was the oldest of six children of Jambakam and A. Venkataraman. His maternal uncle was S. Satyamurti, a renowned Indian independence activist and accomplished leader of the Indian National Congress from the Madras Presidency. His school years were spent at the Kulapathi Balaiya School and the Christian Mission school at Pudukottai followed by the Intermediate education at the Pudukottai Raja's college. He pursued his graduate and post-graduate studies at the Annamalai University.

While a student, he joined the NCC and obtained the rank of a Senior Under Officer and underwent training to become an Army Officer. Service to the nation in some form was what he wanted to do. However, on completing his graduation, the Department of Statistics in Annamalai University offered him a teaching position which he took up in 1959. When war broke out between India and China in 1962, he was enlisted to join the Army. After training he joined as a Commissioned Officer in the Indian Army through the Short Service Commission and was promoted as Captain by the end of the war. He was then posted to serve as Commander (NCC) at Chennai while he continued to teach at Annamalai University.

=== Early career ===
In 1966, Bala attended a month-long workshop conducted by Dr. Landis Gephart on Quality Control and Reliability Engineering organised under the aegis of USAID in Chennai. At the end of the workshop, he was offered a full scholarship to pursue his MS/PhD at the University of Dayton, Ohio. He completed his MSE (Engineering) course and was appointed an Assistant Professor of Industrial and Systems Engineering, University of Dayton, in 1970. Later, he went on to pursue his MBA and PhD in Operations Research at the Carnegie Mellon University and joined the Graduate School of Management at Northwestern University (now Kellogg School of Management) in 1973. His work with Kellogg was recognised by the award of the J. L. Kellogg Distinguished Professorship in Accounting, Information and Management in 1984.

== Academic career ==
Balachandran founded the Great Lakes Institute of Management, an independent business school in Chennai, India. He was also a professor emeritus at the Kellogg School of Business at Northwestern University, where he has been on the faculty since 1973. Prior to Kellogg, Balachandran has been on the faculty at the University of Dayton, Carnegie Mellon University, and Annamalai University.

== Personal life ==
Balachandran was married to Vasantha Balachandran. They had two sons, Sudhakar Balachandran (Director of MBA Graduate Studies & Associate Professor of Accounting at the University of Illinois, Chicago) and Diwakar Balachandran (Professor, Department of Pulmonary Medicine, Division of Internal Medicine, The University of Texas MD Anderson Cancer Center). Balachandran died on 28 September 2021 at the age of 84.

== Selected works ==
=== Research ===
Balachandran's published research includes:

- "The Customer Centricity Culture: Drivers for Sustainable Profitability". Journal of Cost Management. 21 (6): 12–19. 2007.

Coauthored

- Sridharan, Swaminathan (first coauthor). (2018). "Efficiency-Promoting Aggregate Disclosures and Multiple Layers of Information Asymmetry". Journal of Accounting Research.
- With: Ramji Balakrishnan; Konduru Sivaramakrishnan. (2007). "On the Relevance of Product Life Cycle for Cost-Based Pricing". (Working paper). Listing
- With: Sudhakar Balachandran. (2005). "Cost Culture Through Cost Maturity Model". Journal of Cost Management. 19: 15–27.
- With: Shyam Sunder. (2003). "Interface Between ABC/M Requirements and Multi-Dimensional Databases". Journal of Cost Management. 17 (6): 33–39.
- With: David Barter. (2002). "Velocity Costing for A Manufacturing Environment". Journal of Cost Management. 16 (1): 39–42.
- With: Hemang Desai; K. Ramesh; S.Ramu Thiagarajan. (2002). "An Investigation of the Informational Role of Short Interest in the Nasdaq Market". Journal of Finance. 57 (5): 2263–2287.

=== Books ===
- Balachandran, Bala V. (1999). Business Process Reengineering: Its History, Promises, and Problems. Morristown, NJ (US): Financial Executive Research Foundation, Inc Catalog listing ISBN 9781885065162 OCLC 42841838

== Awards ==
- Kellogg Alumni Professor of the Year Award, Kellogg School of Management, 1997
- Sidney J. Levy Teaching Award, Kellogg School of Management, 1996–1997
- Padma Shri Award by the Government of India, 2001
