= Eswatini Democracy Campaign =

The Eswatini Democracy Campaign consists of organisations from Eswatini and South Africa that advocate democracy in Eswatini. The campaign supports the democratic initiatives of trade unions, NGOs, student organisations and other organisations that further the cause of democratization in Eswatini. The campaign calls upon the South African government and those of other SADC countries to acknowledge that they are in effect protecting the undemocratic and repressive Eswatini regime. The campaign seeks the removal of restrictions on political parties, the news media and political gatherings, and calls for free, multi-party elections.
