= B. P. Sanjay =

B. P. Sanjay had his basic academic training in communication and journalism in Bangalore and obtained a Ph.D. from Simon Fraser University, Canada. He taught at Madras University and MS University (Tirunelveli) before he moved to University of Hyderabad as a professor in 1995.

Sanjay was involved in studying the historic Satellite Instructional Television Experiment (SITE) and his professional expertise and interests are in the areas of political economy of information and communication technologies, development communication, and international communication. He has been associated with various national and international bodies that chalk out policies on media education and research. He was the director of the Indian Institute of Mass Communication. Sanjay was the pro vice-chancellor of the university. He was the vice-chancellor of the Central University of Tamil Nadu. At present he is a senior professor in Manipal Institute of Communication.
