= Svarupananda Desikar =

Tamil scholar during the late 14th– early 15th century

Svarupananda Desikar was a noted Tamil scholar during the late 14th century – early 15th century. Among other writings, he is known for his anthology containing 2824 verses on the Advaita philosophy. This work is known as Sivaprakasap-perundirattu. Tattuvarayar was an ascetic scholar and disciple of Svarupananda Desikar. Kurunthirattu was written by him.
