= Pregs Govender =

South African human rights activist

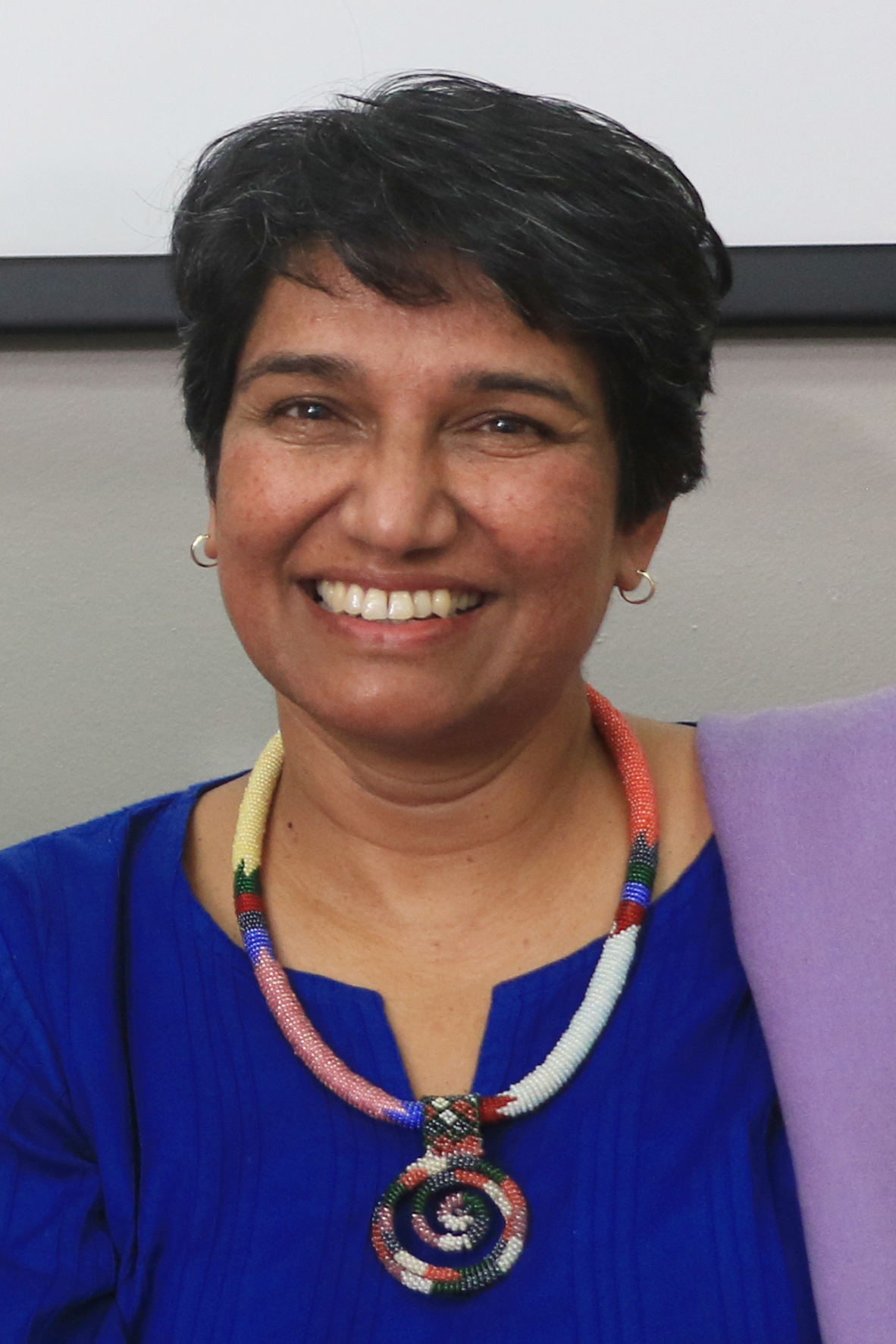
- Born: 15 February 1960 (age 66); Durban, Natal Province, Union of South Africa
- Occupations: human rights activist, author, politician
- Known for: anti-apartheid activist; former ANC Member of Parliament; Deputy Chairperson, South African Human Rights Commission
- Website: www.pregsgovender.com

Pregaluxmi "Pregs" Govender (born 15 February 1960) is a South African human rights activist, author, and politician.

Brought up in a political family she was taking action against apartheid by the age of 14. She became a teacher in Durban joining unions and the ANC. In 1994 she entered the first South African Democratic parliament where she argued for women's rights including the laws permitting abortions.

== Life ==
Govender was born in 1960 in Durban and she was brought up in a family of five in a two room flat. Her parents were obliged to live there because the Apartheid government was passed laws that made it illegal for people of some races from living in the place of their choice. This was known as urban apartheid. Govender was exposed to many visitors to their home and by the age of fourteen she was an activist against apartheid. She attended university and worked as a teacher in Durban.

== Democratic South African Parliament (1994-2002) ==
In 1994, Govender was elected as a member of parliament for the African National Congress party. She co-edited SA's country report to the 1995 Beijing Conference and served on leadership structures that established the National Gender Machinery and the national empowerment policy framework. During her term (1996-2002), the JMCIQLSW ensured that 80% of its feminist legislative priorities, including the Domestic Violence Act, the Customary Marriages Act, the Child Maintenance Act and changes to labour laws advancing women's rights in the workplace were enacted. In 1996, Govender declined to be the ANC's woman speaker of government's neo-liberal economic policy GEAR) launch in parliament and her pro-choice abortion speech in support of the Choice on Termination of Pregnancy Act, 1996 received a prize from a newspaper.

Commenting on Govender's career as an MP, political scientist Tom Lodge said, "In 2001, the most obviously independent ANC parliamentary initiatives were to be found in the joint monitoring committee on the status of women, chaired by Pregs Govender, which challenged government on spending priorities and Aids policy. In 2001, Govender abstained from voting on the defence budget. Such assertive behaviour may become increasingly exceptional."

Govender's clarity in the face of former President Thabo Mbeki’s HIV/Aids denialism during her tenure as an MP is widely respected. Author and journalist Mark Gevisser explained in 2007 how, “Only one elected ANC representative, Pregs Govender, the chair of a parliamentary committee on the status of women, resigned and publicly criticised Mbeki. And even behind closed doors only one or two people actually had the courage to tell Mbeki they thought he was wrong.”

== South African Human Rights Commission (SAHRC) and Independent Consultancies ==
In 2007, Govender was elected Chair of the Independent Panel Assessment of Parliament, which proposed stronger oversight and electoral reform. As Commissioner for the South African Human Rights Commission and as its Deputy Chair (2009-2015), Govender drove implementation of SAHRC findings at local and provincial level. She secured a country-wide status report and action plan from the Presidency on water and sanitation. This is still widely used by organisations and the media to monitor government implementation and raise awareness of corporate accountability for water pollution, wastage and theft.

Govender works as an independent writer and consultant. She wrote the concept note and facilitated the South African Parliament's first Africa-wide conference on gender and economics. For the Inter-Parliamentary Union’s first global conference on HIV and AIDS, Govender wrote a concept paper on the role of MPs in ensuring affordable medicine. She facilitated the International Feminist University Network's Curriculum Workshop on Feminism and Globalisation. She has conducted local and international workshops on using the power of love and courage to be insubordinate to injustice, including teaching practical skills in relation to gender budgets and policy.

== Awards and recognition ==
Govender's voluntary contributions include being patron of Gun-free SA and previously on the global Panel on Human Dignity. Her awards include the Ashoka Fellowship, an honorary doctorate in Law and one in Philosophy, the inaugural Ruth First fellowship for courageous writing and activism, the Thousand Currents Artist in Residence, and the International Association for Women's Rights in Development (AWID) Inspiration Award for her “initiative, leadership, and unrelenting commitment [that] have made a significant impact in advancing gender equality and social justice around the world”.

== Publications ==
Govender has written over 300 speeches, media articles, reports and book chapters in local and international publications. Jacana Media published her political memoir, Love and Courage, A Story of Insubordination, in 2007, with a second edition in 2016, which included a new introduction by Govender. Govender has written op-eds for a variety of top South African news publications, including the Mail & Guardian, the Sunday Times and Daily Maverick. Govender has written book chapters in several books, including Singing in the Dark Times, In the Balance: South Africans debate reconciliation, Democracy in the Time of Mbeki, The Virus, Vitamins and Vegetables: The SA HIV/AIDS Mystery and Towards a New Partnership with Africa. She has been profiled in Women Leading Africa, Life and Soul: Portraits of Women Who Move South Africa and Voice, Power and Soul: Portraits of African Feminists. Govender has written forewords to several books, including the SA Women's Budget Initiative's Women's Budget Books and the afterword to Beyond States and Markets: The challenges of social reproduction.
