= Karthy Govender =

Karthy Govender is a commissioner for the South African Human Rights Commission. Karthy Govender, along with Commissioner Jody Kollapen are two Commissioners of minority South African Indian Tamil ancestry. Karthy Govender is also an associate professor in the law faculty at the University of KwaZulu-Natal, where he teaches Constitutional and Administrative Law. He is also a visiting professor at the University of Michigan Law School. He has widely published in literature on Constitutional law.
