= Ronnie Govender =

South African playwright (1934–2021)

Ronnie Govender OIS
- Born: Sathiseelan Gurilingam Govender; 16 May 1934 Durban, Natal, Union of South Africa
- Died: 29 April 2021 (aged 86)
- Occupation: Playwright and theatre director
- Language: English
- Notable works: At the Edge and other Cato Manor Stories; Black Chin White Chin
- Notable awards: Order of Ikhamanga (Category II: Silver)

Sathiseelan Gurilingam "Ronnie" Govender OIS (16 May 1934 – 29 April 2021) was a South African playwright, theatre director and activist known for his community theatre efforts. He was known as a pioneer of Indian South African theatre in the country. Some of his notable works included Black Chin White Chin, Song of the Atman, and At the Edge and Other Cato Manor Stories. At the Edge won the 1997 Commonwealth Writers' Prize for best first book, Africa.

Govender received the government of South Africa's Order of Ikhamanga in 2008 for his contributions to democracy, peace and justice in the country through theatre.

== Early life ==
Sathiseelan Gurilingam Govender was born on 16 May 1934 in Cato Manor, an Indian neighbourhood of Durban. His father was also born in Cato Manor, while his mother was born in Fynnlands, another part of Durban. His grandparents on both sides of the family came from South India. After completing their term of indenture, his grandparents settled in Cato Manor. Like other Indian families in South Africa, they bought a small plot of land to grow vegetables. His maternal grandfather became a court interpreter. His father was a truck driver and his mother a housewife. Govender had ten brothers and sisters.

== Career ==
After finishing his primary and secondary education, Govender began studying at the University of Cape Town (UCT), and took on a job as a sportswriter for the New Age to pay his fees. In line with the paper's stance against apartheid, Govender encouraged the Indian community to boycott segregated sporting events. However, the newspaper was closed by the authorities one year after Govender joined. Unable to support himself in Cape Town, he returned to Durban and entered Springfield Training College to become a teacher.

After he became a teacher, Govender began his career as a writer. His first play Beyond Calvary (1962) received praise from critics. In 1964, with Muthal Naidoo and Bennie Bersee, he founded a theatre company called the Shah Theatre Academy in opposition to the liberal theatre of the day. He went on to write other plays, including The Lahnee's Pleasure (1972), one of South Africa's longest-running plays. Although Govender received invitations to tour The Lahnee's Pleasure abroad and in mainstream South African theatres, he refused as part of the cultural boycott of apartheid. His short story collection At the Edge and Other Cato Manor Stories won the 1997 Commonwealth Writers' Prize for best first book, Africa. The book built on stories from his childhood growing up in Cato Manor, an Indian neighbourhood of Durban. The book was later adapted to a one-woman performance portrayed by actress Jailoshini Naidoo. The play 1949 (1994), also based on Govender's childhood in Cato Manor, discusses the life of the Indian community in South Africa following the Group Areas Act. His 2007 book Black Chin White Chin was shortlisted for the 2007 Commonwealth Prize. Critics have described Govender's writing style as unadorned, and have said that his works evoke the identity of the Indian community with its vitality, humour, and resilience in a difficult environment. His works have been considered important in constructing the South African national identity.

The South African government awarded him the Order of Ikhamanga in 2008 "for [his] excellent contribution to democracy and justice in South Africa through the genre of theatre". In 2014, the Durban University of Technology also awarded Govender an honorary doctorate "for his contribution to literature and the arts in general as well as his contribution to democracy, peace and justice in South Africa through theatre".

== Personal life ==
His daughter, Pregs Govender, is a human rights activist and former South African member of parliament.

Govender died on 29 April 2021, from age-related illnesses. He was 86.

== Works ==
- An Edition of the Collected Plays of Ronnie Govender, University of Natal, 1991
- The Lahnee's Pleasure. Ravan Press. 1992. ISBN 978-0-86975-087-2.
- At the Edge and Other Cato Manor Stories, Manx, 1996, ISBN 1-919690-52-2
- Song of the Atman, Jacana Media, 2006, ISBN 978-17-7009-186-3
- Interplay: A Collection of South African Plays, MANX, 2006, ISBN 978-1-919690-97-1
- Black Chin White Chin, HarperCollins, 2007, ISBN 978-81-7223-690-8
- In the Manure: Memories and Reflections, David Philip, 2008, ISBN 978-0-86486-720-9
