= N. Ravichandran =

Indian real-estate businessman

- Born: Tiruchirappalli, India
- Education: Harvard University (OPM)
- Occupations: Business magnate, entrepreneur, investor, philanthropist
- Years active: 1997–present
- Known for: Founder of TVH (True Value Homes) group
- Title: Chairman of TVH (True Value Homes) group of companies
- Relatives: K. N Nehru- DMK Leader
- Website: www.tvh.in

N. Ravichandran is an Indian business magnate, investor and philanthropist. He is the founder and chairman of TVH (True Value Homes) group, an Indian conglomerate with presence in real estate, energy and construction.

== Early life and education ==
Ravichandran grew up in Trichy and later moved to Chennai. He is a civil engineer and he obtained his OPM from Harvard Business School in the United States.

== Career ==
In 1997, Ravichandran founded True Value Homes (TVH). TVH has offices in Chennai, Trichy, Coimbatore and Kochin. By 2013, TVH had developed six million sq.ft cumulatively in both commercial and residential space.

== Honours and awards ==
- Reality Plus – Luxuary project of the year 2012
- Reality Plus – Environmental friendly project of the year 2012
- Best affordable housing of the year 2012 & 2013 awarded by NDTV Profit
- CNBC Real Estate Award for BEST 100% completed ultra luxury residential
- Best concrete structure award for the year 2011 recognised by the Tamil Nadu Government

== Philanthropy ==
- Ravichandran, through TVH, helped organise Medical camps in economically backward villages, and day care facilities for the children. He also organized Creche's and schools at each site to educate the children of contract labourers
- He proactively donates to Udavum Karangal, a charity for orphans and the destitute and to other such charities.
- Under his stewardship, TVH has adopted more than 700 orphan children from the Indian Council of Child Welfare
- Ravichandran is also actively working to create awareness about the importance of educating the Girl child.
