= List of Mudaliars =

Mudaliar, also spelled as Mudaliyar, Muthaliyar, Mudali, and Mudhali, is a surname used by people belonging to Sengunthar, Thuluva Vellalar and Kondaikatti Vellalar. It is derived from the honorary title Mudali meaning a person of first rank in the Tamil language, which was bestowed upon top-ranking bureaucratic officials, philanthropists, educationists, physicians, politicians and army officers in medieval south India during the rule of Imperial Cholas.

The following is a list of people who belong to Mudaliar communities.

== Historical personalities ==
=== Poets ===
- Irattaipulavar (Mudhusooriyar, Ilam sooriyar) 14th century poetical-duo (one blind and one lame) who authored Ekambaranathar ula.
- Kangeyar, a 14th-century poet who wrote "Urichol Nigandu".
- Padikasu Pulavar Tamil poet of 17th century known for his work 'Thondaimandala Sadhakam'.

=== Chieftains and ministers ===
- Vallal Sadaiyappa Mudaliar: 12th Century velir chieftain: Lived Puducherry: and Thiruvenainallur: in Tamil Nadu. Patron of Tamil Poet Kambar: who created Kamba Ramayanam.
- Ottakoothar: 12th century court poet and minister of Cholas under Vikrama Chola, Kulothunga Chola II, Raja Raja Chola II reign. He is known as Kavichakravarthy.
- Kaikolar Andar Magan Pokkaran Pandiyatharaiyan: was a prominent chieftain in the region of Thiruchanur near Tirupati during the 13th century, under the reign of Rajaraja Chola III.
- Ariyanatha Mudaliar: Vellala Dalavoy of the Vijayanagar viceroy Viswanatha Nayaka.
- Veerabaahu: commander-in-chief of Lord Kartikeya's army.
- Chandramathi Mudaliar: was a 17th-century Tamil chieftain and ruler of south Kongu Nadu (Erode region) who fought many battles against the Telugu Madurai Nayak. Erode Fort was built by him.
- Kottaiyannan Mudaliar: was a 14th-century chieftain who was ruling Kongu region and fought against Muslim invaders. He belongs to the lineage of Sengunthar Therinja Kaikolar regiment.
- Chinnan Mudaliyar: chief of Rasipuram in 16th century. He renovated many temples. He constructed a mandapam in Tiruchengode Ardhanareeswarar temple. People call him as Rasipuram Chinna Mudaliyar.
- Gatti Mudalis: rulers based in Taramangalam in 17th century.
- Chinna Thambi Mudaliar: 17th-century treasurer of the Madurai army.

== Modern personalities ==
=== Zamindars and Mirasdars ===
- S. Sivaraj Mudaliyar: Mirasdar from Tirukovilur whose family holds thousands of acre cultivatable land in that area. He won 4 times as MLA from Rishivandyam constituency.
- C. Muttukumarasami Mudaliyar : Chunampet Muttukumarasami Mudaliyar was the hereditary zamindar of Chunampet in Chingleput district and politician who served as a member of the Madras Legislative Council for three consecutive terms from 1904 to 1907. His son Arunachala Mudaliar was a popular politician of the Justice Party.
- Nagamanikam Mudaliyar: Last Zamindar of Nanjai Uthukuli, Erode district. 1,600 acre zamin estate.
- Maasillamani Mudaliyar: Mirasdar of Thirukandeeswaram, Cuddalore district, who hold 1,200 acre cultivatable land. NLC India Limited founder Rao Bahadur T. M. Jambulingam Mudaliar is son of Maasillamani Mudaliar.

=== Social leaders, activists ===
- S. P. Ayyaswamy Mudaliar, His house Gandhi Peak in Royapettah, Chennai hosted many INC meetings and Netaji.
- C. Jambulingam Mudaliar, Indian politician and freedom-fighter who served as a civil court judge and member of the Madras Legislative Council
- Muthuranga Mudaliar, Freedom-fighter from Nasarath pettai near Poonamallee in Thiruvallur District. He participated in the Quit India Movement in 1942
- Sarojini Varadappan, Social worker in women welfare and empowerment, awarded Padma Shri 1971 and Padma Bhushan in 2009.
- M.B. Nirmal, Social worker in consumer advocacy, afforestation programmes, and rehabilitation of convicts among others.

=== Tamil literature ===
- Bharathidhasan (1891–1964) (born as Kanaga. Subburathinam Mudaliar) known as Paavendhar, Puratchi Kavignar, Tamil poet, politician, social activist and teacher.
- A. Singaravelu Mudaliar:Compiled a Tamil encyclopedia entitled Apitana Cintamani.
- Makaral Karthikeya Mudaliar: Tamil scholar
- Pa. Subramania Mudaliar: Tamil scholar
- Mahavidwan Vasudeva Mudaliar: Tamil scholar
- Thandavarayar Mudaliyar, Tamil enthusiast, translated panchatantra from maratha language
- T. K. Chidambaranatha Mudaliar: A scholar and author of Kambar tharum Ramayanam.
- Tamilanban (b.1933): Tamil Poet and writer.

=== Philanthropists ===
- Rao Bahadur M. Jambulingam Mudaliar, Philanthropist from Cuddalore who was donator of 620 acres land to Neyveli lignite corporation.
- Nachimuthu Mudaliar, a philanthropist from Chennimalai. He was the founder of Chentex weavers co-operative society in which thousands of weavers benefited and he was a Padma Shree awardee. He was former president of Senguntha Mahajana Sangam.
- Pachaiyappa Mudaliar, Philanthropist after whom the Pachaiyappa's College, Pachiyappa's Trust Board, Chennai was named.
- V. L. Ethiraj, Renowned Barrister and Philanthropist who donated his life savings and founded the Ethiraj College for Women.
- Raja Sir Ramaswamy Mudaliar: Philanthropist who endowed a hospital and dispensary in the Native infirmary and was a leader of Indian National Congress
- Arcot Narrainsawmy Mudaliar, Philanthropist who founded the R.B.A.N.M.'s Educational Charities and R.B.A.N.M.'s Chattram and other Charities.

=== Politics ===
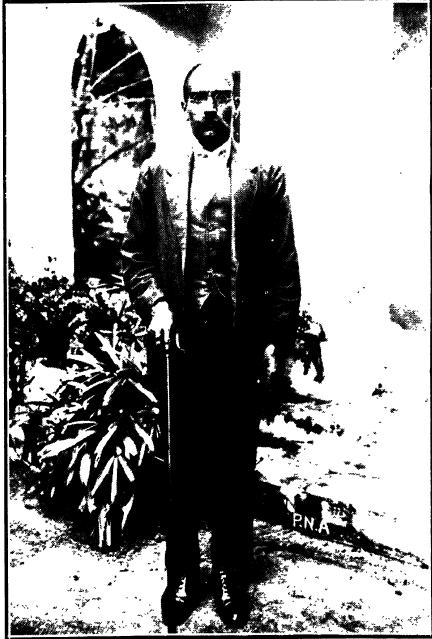
Natesa Mudaliar, Founded Justice Party along with Theagaraya Chetty and Dr. T. M. Nair as part of the Dravidian movement.

- C. Natesa Mudaliar: One of the founders of Justice Party
- Ponnambala Thiaga Rajan, Former Chief Minister of Madras Presidency and Former President of Justice Party
- Conjeevaram Natarajan Annadurai, Fourth and last Chief Minister of Madras State and the First Chief Minister of Tamil Nadu, Founder of Dravida Munnetra Kazhagam
- Minjur Bhaktavatsalam, 4th Chief Minister of Madras State
- V. R. Nedunchezhiyan, Former Acting Chief Minister of Tamil Nadu, Former General Secretary of the Dravida Munnetra Kazhagam & the All India Anna Dravida Munnetra Kazhagam
- Arcot Ramasamy Mudaliar, Indian lawyer, politician and statesman
- K. Anbazhagan, Former Finance Minister of Tamil Nadu, Former General Secretary of the Dravida Munnetra Kazhagam.
- Pulavar K. Govindan: 4 times elected as MLA. Two times elected as speaker of Tamil Nadu legislative Assembly.
- V. K. Ramaswami Mudaliar, Indian politician, ex opposition leader Legislative Assembly.
- C. Gopal Mudaliyar former MLA and MP.
- M. R. Kandasamy Mudaliar first MLA of Veerapandi
- A. Mariappan Mudaliar: freedom Fighter and former MLA
- C. S. Ratnasabhapathy Mudaliar, Father of Modern Coimbatore
- S. Muthiah Mudaliar, Minister of Education (1928–1830).
- C. Muttukumarasami Mudaliyar, Indian politician and hereditary zamindar of Chunampet. Member of the Madras Legislative Council 1904–7
- R. N. Arogyasamy Mudaliar: an Indian civil engineer and politician who served as the Minister of Development in the Madras Presidency from 1926 to 1928
- A. M. Ponnuranga Mudaliar: Former MLA of Sholinghur constituency, INC
- C. Ramaswamy Mudaliar (1905–1997), Indian politician from Indian National Congress. Member of Lok Sabha for Kumbakonam from 1951 to 1957.
- S. J. Ramaswamy Mudali: Textile merchant and Former MLA of Arakkonam and former MP of Sholinghur constituency.
- A. Ranganatha Mudaliar: Indian politician and theosophist from Bellary, first Commissioner of the Thirumala-Tirupathi devasthanam board from 1935 to 1939.
- S. C. Sadayappa Mudaliar: textile merchant, freedom fighter and Former Arakkonam MLA.
- S. V. Natesa Mudaliar: Former INC MLA from Kanchipuram, Famous for defeating former chief minister C.N Annadurai.
- P. T. R. Palanivel Rajan, 9th Speaker of the Tamil Nadu Legislative Assembly and Former Minister for Hindu Religious and Charitable Endowments, Government of Tamil Nadu
- A. R. Subbiah Mudaliar: Tamil Nadu politician
- C. P. Subbiah Mudaliar: Freedom fighter and former MLA of Coimbatore. Former Vice President of Indian National Congress party.
- Muniswamy Mudaliar: Fiji Indian politician
- O. V. Alagesa Mudaliar: freedom fighter and Tamil Nadu politician, India's Ambassador to Ethiopia from 1968 to 1971.
- E. S. Thyagarajan Mudaliar: Prominent leader of DMK and he was former MLA of Tiruttani constituency. Uncle of Dr. E.S.S. Raman.
- Dr. E.S.S. Raman: State Vice President Tamil Maanila Congress and was former MLA of Pallipattu constituency.
- B. Senguttuvan: Prominent lawyer from Vellore and former Member of Parliament.
- Palanivel Thiagarajan, Minister for Finance and Human Resources Management, Government of Tamil Nadu

=== Civil service and judiciary ===
- T. V. Rajeswar IPS: former Intelligence Bureau chief and a Governor of 4 states.
- S. Muthiah Mudaliar, High Court lawyer and politician, Justice party
- Arcot Ramasamy Mudaliar, Mayor of Madras (1928–30), Vice Chancellor of University of Kerala (1951–61), leader of the Justice Party politician, member of Winston Churchill's war cabinet, first President of ECOSOC and Founder of WHO, founding Chairman of ICICI Bank, Diwan of Mysore; awarded Padma Vibushan
- Kanakaraya Mudali, Chief dubash and a broker for the French East India Company
- Salem Ramaswami Mudaliar, Indian lawyer, politician and Indian independence activist.
- Shanmughasundaram Mohan, Former Judge of the Supreme Court of India and Former Chief Justice of the Madras High Court & Karnataka High Court, Former Acting Governor of Karnataka.
- R Sudhakar, Former Chief Justice of the Manipur High Court and President of the National Company Law Tribunal.
- T. S. Sivagnanam, Chief Justice of the Calcutta High Court.

=== Sports ===
- Mangalam Chinnaswamy Mudaliar, Founder Karnataka Cricket Association, President BCCI, M. Chinnaswamy Stadium in Bangalore is named after him.
- C. D. Gopinath, Former Indian Test cricketer.

=== Arts and cinema ===
- T. R. Sundaram Mudaliyar Yesteryears Film producer and Founder of Modern Theatres Ltd. Hailed from Pullikkarar Gothram.
- P.A. Perumal Mudaliar, Producer, director and founder of National Pictures Limited which distributed more than 200 films . He introduced Sivaji Ganesan and M. R. Radha to the cinema world.
- A. Jagannathan, Yesteryears Tamil film director
- P. S. Veerappa, Yesteryears Tamil film producer and actor.
- Papanasa Mudaliar, Carnatic music composer
- Pammal Sambandha Mudaliar, playwright and director of Tamil drama
- R. Nataraja Mudaliar, pioneer in the production of silent films
- Alarmel Valli, Classical dancer, teacher and choreographer, exponent of the Pandanallur style, of the classical dance form of Bharatanatyam, awarded Padma Shri in 1991 and Padma Bhushan in 2004.
- Meenakshi Chitharanjan, Classical dancer, teacher and choreographer, exponent of the Pandanallur style of the classical dance form of Bharatanatyam, awarded Padma Shri in 2008.
- K.S.Ravi Kumar, Tamil film director
- R.K.Selvamani, Tamil film director
- Anandaraj, Tamil actor
- Pandiarajan: Tamil film actor who has played leading roles in many humorous Tamil films.
- Prashanth: known for his works predominantly in Tamil cinema. Besides Tamil films, he has also appeared in few Telugu, Hindi and Malayalam films.
- Pa. Vijay: Tamil poet, film actor, lyricist and national awardee for best lyrics.
- Vikranth: is an Indian actor who has appeared in Tamil language films. He is the cousin of popular Tamil actor Vijay
- G. V. Prakash Kumar: is an Indian music composer, playback singer, actor, and film producer known for his work in Tamil cinema
- Lokesh Kanagaraj, Tamil film director
- Shoba Chandrasekhar: Playback singer

=== Educationists, Doctors, scientists and academicians ===
- V. Natrajan Mudaliar, well known as V.N.R, was a well known businessman in Vellore and also an educationist. He was a former leader of parent teachers association in Katpadi, Vellore Govt boys higher secondary school and he is the man behind the auditorium in Govt higher secondary school, katpadi which fully funded by V.N.R which stands still on his remberence and also The govt appreciate the service and named the auditorium with V.N.R father name. as k.VEERABADRA MUDALIAR MEMORIAL AUDITORIUM. He is not only known for his educationist role, he was also known for his leather & Bark Mundy in Vellore town. He was the man behind KMV GROUP.
- A. Lakshmanaswami Mudaliar, first Indian Principal of the Madras Medical College and longest-serving Vice Chancellor of the University of Madras; Chairman of UNESCO;First chairman IIT MADRAS, awarded Padma Vibhushan for Medicine, 1963.
- Guruswami Mudaliar, first Indian to be appointed Professor of Therapeutics at the Madras Medical College, first Dean of Madras Medical college
- N. D. Sundaravadivelu, Former Vice Chancellor, University of Madras
- C. Tadulinga Mudaliar, Indian botanist, Former Mayor of Madras
- Munirathna Anandakrishnan, Former Vice-Chancellor, Anna University, Chennai and Former Chairman, IIT Kanpur, awarded Padma Shri in 2002.
- Mylswamy Annadurai, ISRO Scientist, known as Moon Man of India, awarded Padma Shri in 2016. Programme director of Chandrayaan-1 and Mangalyaan mission.
- M. Annamalai, Space scientist and former director of the Satish Dhawan Space Centre, Sriharikota and Senior Advisor for Space Transportations Systems at ISRO.
- V. M. Muralidharan, Chairman of the Ethiraj College for Women
- Aswath Damodaran, Professor of Finance at the Stern School of Business, New York University
- S. Kameswaran, ENT surgeon, awarded Padma Shri in 1990.
- Thanikachalam Sadagopan, Cardiologist, awarded Padma Shri in 2009.
- Sivapatham Vittal, Surgical endocrinologist, considered by many as the Father of Surgical Endocrinology in India, awarded Padma Shri in 2011.
- Mohan Kameswaran, Otorhinolaryngologist, awarded Padma Shri in 2012.

=== Miscellaneous ===
- Varadarajan Mudaliar, Bombay based don known as Vardha Bhai; the Tamil movie Nayakan was based on his life story
- Raja Mudaliar, richest trader in Malacca during the early 16th century.
