= Meenakshisundaram Pillai =

Meenakshisundaram Pillai (1869–1964) is a classical dance guru considered as the prominent founder of Pandanallur style of Bharatanatyam, Indian dance. He lived in the village of Pandanallur, in the Thanjavur district in the south Indian state of Tamil Nadu.

== Background ==
Meenakshisundaram Pillai, whose ancestors were nattuvanars, was a descendant from the Thanjavur Quartet, which comprised four brothers: Chinnaiah, Ponniah, Sivanandam and Vadivelu. The works of these four brothers, who were court composers in the early 19th century in Thanjavur, form the main classical masterpieces of Bharatanatyam.

Baroda Guru Kubernath Tanjorkar (1916 - 2007), a disciple of Pillai, later established Tanjor Dance Music & Art Research Centre in Baroda, Gujarat. Thiruvallaputhur Swaminatha Pillai, also known as T.K.Swaminatha Pillai, was one of the leading disciples of Pillai. He learned Bharathanatiyam under the Gurukula of Pillai for more than ten years. He also mentored Ram Gopal, who became one of the pioneers of Indian dance in the west.

Pillai was said to have been trained by his uncle, Kumarasamy Nattuvanar. He trained several famous Bharata Natyam dancers, including Devadasis such as Pandanallur Jayalakshmi, Thangachi Ammal, Sabaranjitam, as well as people from other castes such as Mrinalini Sarabhai, Rukmini Devi and Tara Chaudhri. He was one of the most sought after Bharathanatyam Gurus.

After Pillai, his son-in-law Chokkalingam Pillai (1893–1968) became the doyen Guru of the Pandanallur style. Subbaraya Pillai (1914–2008), Chokkalingam Pillai's son, was the next leading Guru of the Pandanallur style. He grew up in the village of Pandanallur and was an apprentice under his grandfather and father. He trained leading dancers such as Alarmel Valli and Meenakshi Chitharanjan.

== Style ==
The Pandanallur style developed a reputation for the emphasis on linear geometry that can be found in the adavu technique, and for its intensity and understatement in abhinaya.

The Pandanallur style is renowned for its choreography, which includes such highly regarded pieces as the Nine or Ten Tanjore Quartet pada-varnams. These works featured choreography by Pillai, who named the dramatic choreography "hands," and was also responsible for the adavu choreography for the swara passages.

Part of their heritage is the valuable jatiswarams (in ragams Vasantha, Saveri, Chakravakam, Kalyani, Bhairavi), which incorporate abstract adavu choreography.

In the Pandanallur style, special emphasis is placed on ‘abhinaya’ (sometimes involving abstract expression). Furthermore, this style discourages the forceful stamping of feet on the floor. Instead, through measured, deliberate movements, a resonant sound is produced from the ‘salangai’ (ankle bells).Firm footwork, in which every step is precisely defined, is a key feature of both dance and music—reflecting the quality of absolute precision and accuracy. Its purpose is to bring out the rhythmic vitality of the dance, which requires the dancer to possess an innate, natural sense of rhythm. However, not all students are able to manifest this quality effectively.
