= Attur Fort =

- Part of Tamil Nadu
- Attur, Tamil Nadu, India
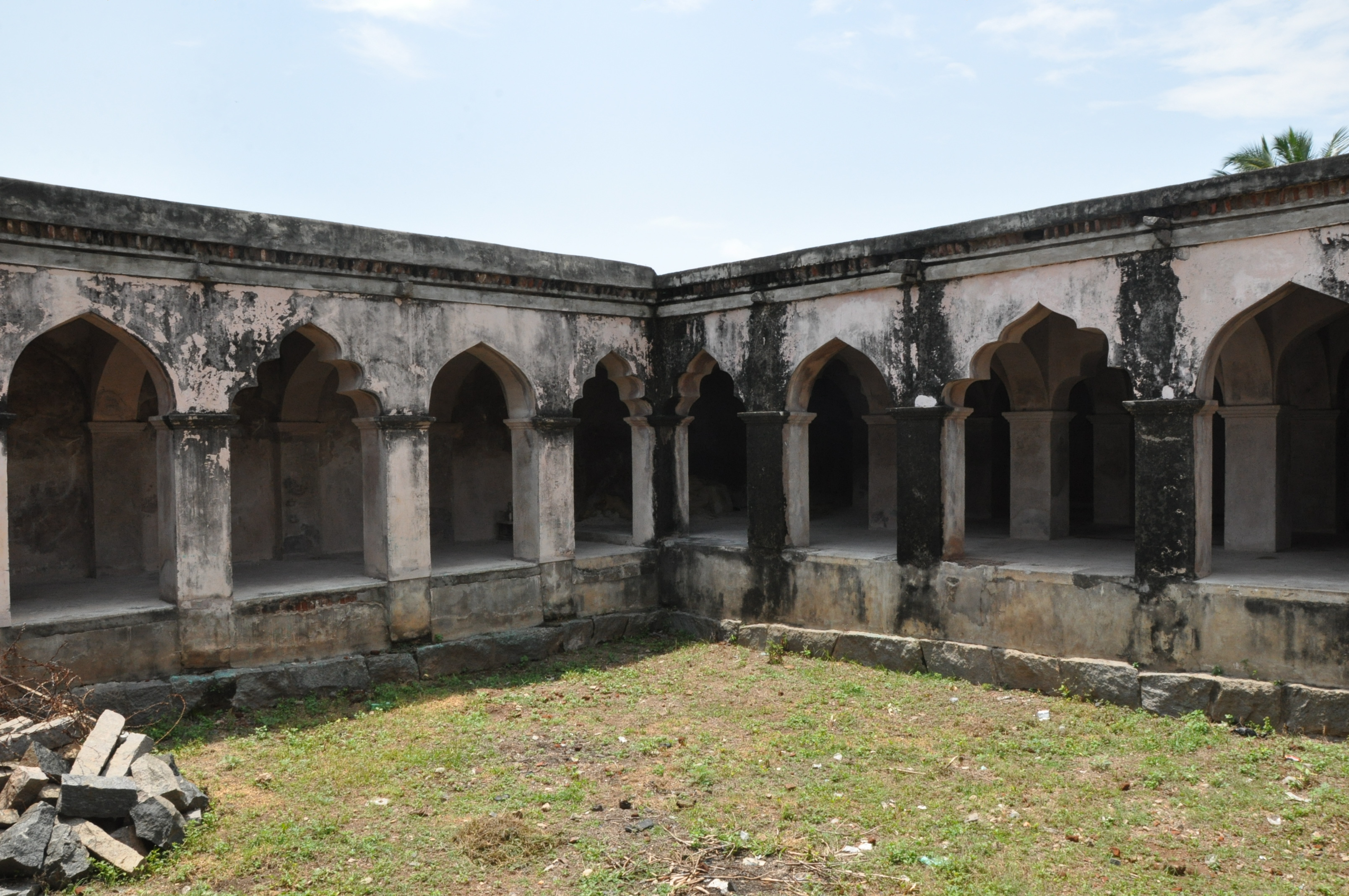
- Attur Fort

Site information
- Type: Forts
- Controlled by: Department of Archaeology

Location
- Location within Tamil Nadu
- Coordinates: 11.603529°N 78.600868°E

Site history
- Built: 17th century
- Built by: Gatti Mudaliars

Attur Fort is a historic fort present in Attur in Salem district in the South Indian state of Tamil Nadu. The fort is located on the banks of river Vashista, 56 km (35 mi) away from Salem.The fort was built by a Palaiyakkarar chieftain Gatti Mudaliar dynasty under Madurai Nayaks, called Lakshmana Nayakan during the 17th century.

It was also occupied by Hyder Ali, Tipu Sultan and British during various times. While it was Tipu Sultan, it switched hands to the British East India Company who got five forts including this one as a part of the Treaty of Srirangapatnam. The fort was used by the British as a garrison till 1854, after which the fort was not operational. In modern times, the fort is under the control of the Archaeological Department of the Government of Tamil Nadu. The fort houses two magazine points, two palaces, a court, three treasuries and three temples. Some portions of the fort are dilapidated, while most other portions are encroached on by slum dwellers.

== History ==
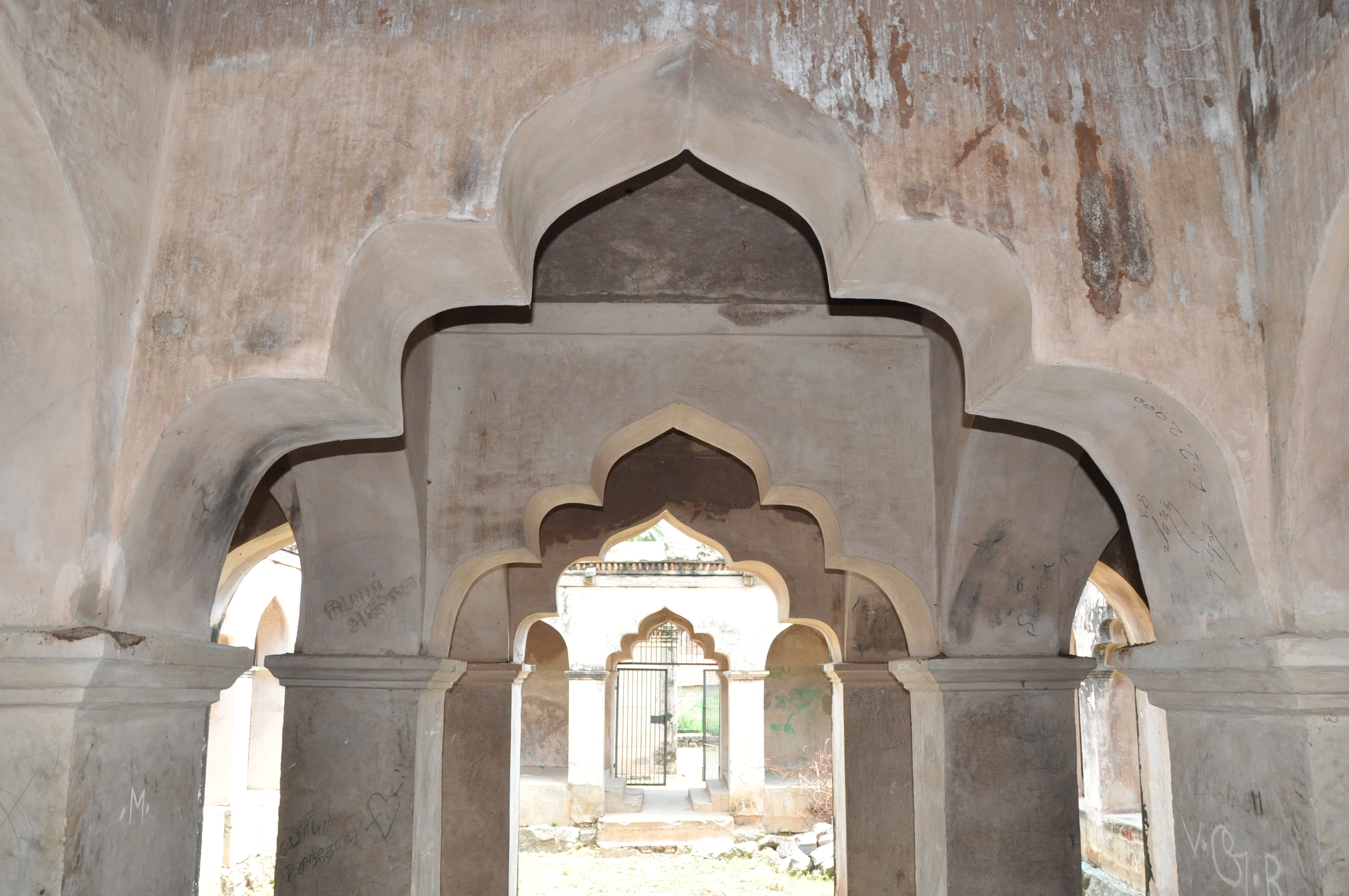
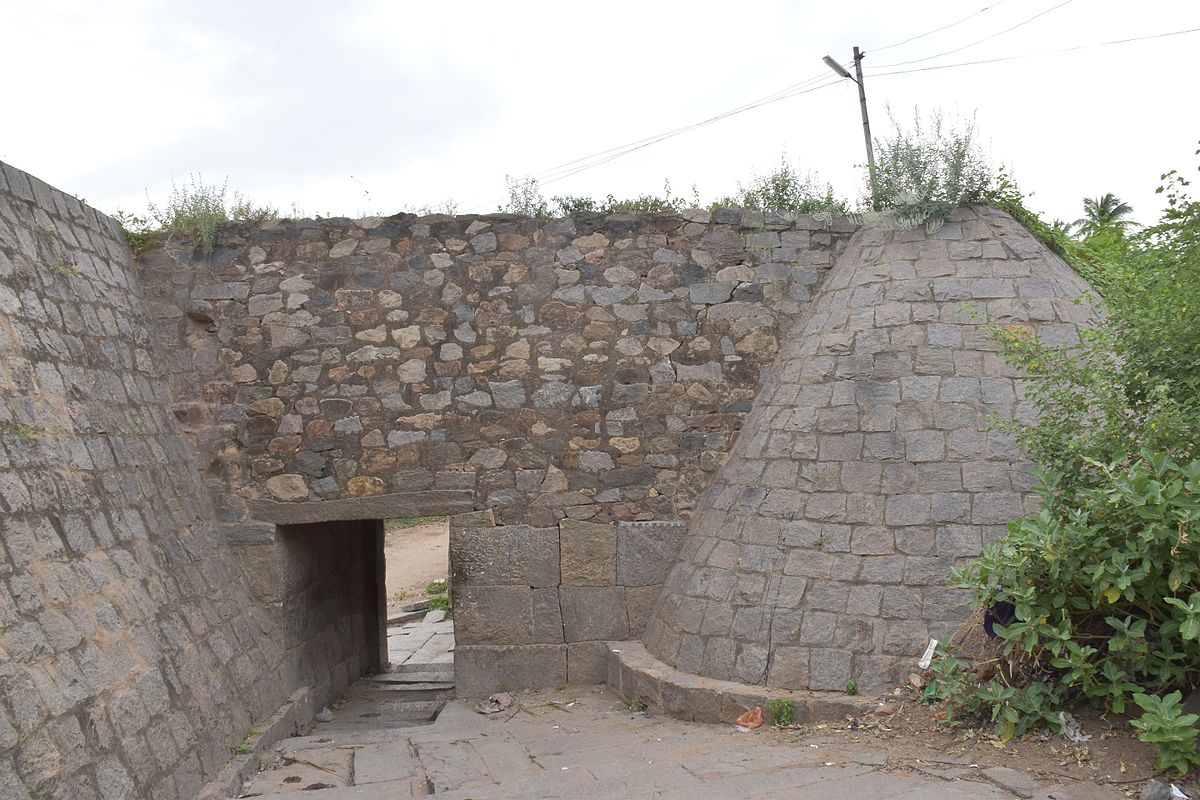
The walls of the fort

The Fort was constructed by a local Palaiyakkarar chieftain Gatti Mudaliar dynasty under Madurai Nayaks. Attur fort became part of Mysore Kingdom in late 17th century when frequent wars between Mysore Kingdom and Thirumalai Nayak of Madurai when large parts of north west Tamil region from Dindigul became part of Mysore rulers. The region became part of Mysore Wodeyar rulers and later under Hyder Ali of Mysore till 1768, when surrendered to Wood of East India Company. Hyder Ali regained the town from the British East India Company, but the Company won a decisive victory in the 3rd Mysore war was against Tipu Sultan, the son of Hyder Ali. Tipu Sultan went on utilize the fort as an arms depot and watch tower. It switched hands to the British East India Company who got five forts including this one as a part of the Treaty of Srirangapatnam.

After the Third Mysore War the region became part of Madras Presidency under British. The fort was used by the British as a garrison from 1792 by the 23rd Madras battalion under the command of Captain Campbell. During subsequent years, the fort was used as an ordnance station from 1799 as the Company troops moved to Sankagiri. After 1854, the fort ceased to act as an operational fortress and the region was clubbed into the newly formed Salem District under the Madras Presidency.

In modern times, the fort is under the control of the Archaeological Department of the Government of Tamil Nadu. Some portions of the fort are dilapidated, while most other portions are encroached on by slum dwellers. In modern times, the fort is maintained by the Archaeological Survey of India.

== Architecture ==
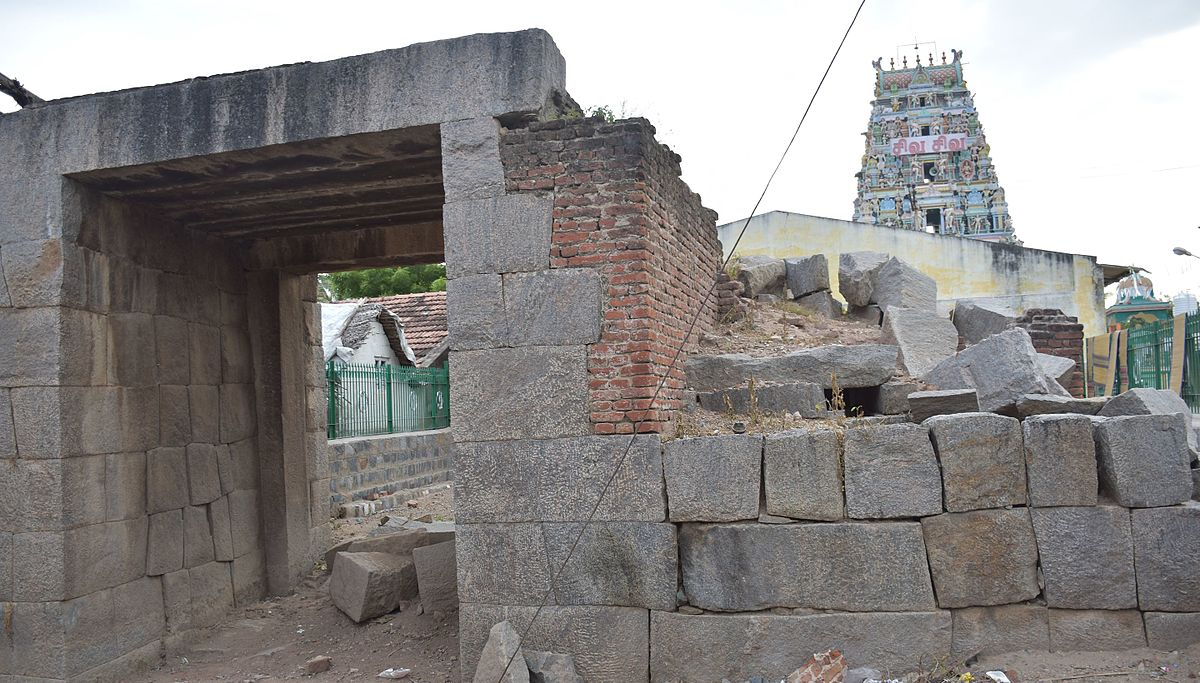
Attur fort ruins

Attur town is situated on the southern bank of the Vasista river. The town was called Attur Ananthagiri during the Mysore rule in 1689 and was called Attur by end of the 18th century. Attur is located 56 km (35 mi) away from Salem. The four has four entrances on all four directions.

The fort occupies an area of 62 acres (250,000 m^{2}) The walls of the fort are about 30 ft (9.1 m) tall and 15 ft (4.6 m) wide. It is decorated by wedge shaped cut-stones fitted without mortar. The construction material for the walls are believed to be quarried from the Kalladithankundru. The fort was guarded by the river in the east and by moats on other sides. The Gatt dynasty used the large chamber inside the fort as audience hall during their regime. The pool house, used for the pleasure of the royal family, was fed from the river through a water gate. The trenches in the fort are constructed in such a way that the water from the river fills it from the South side and joins the course downstream. The fort houses two magazine points, two palaces, a court, three treasuries and three temples. The fort also houses the image of a soldier riding a horse, the tombs of Lieutenant Colonel John Murray and Henry Coyle, Attur Fort Captain, are located on the back side of the fort.
