= Thondaimandala Vellalar =

Subcate of Vellalar caste in Tamil Nadu, South India

Thondaimandala Vellalar is a high-ranking subcaste of the Vellalar caste in the state of Tamil Nadu, India who tend, to adopt the title of Mudaliar and they were traditional "landlords and officials of the state class" described by the anthropologist Kathleen Gough. They are a closely knit community and follow the Vegetarian diet. Thondaimandalam Mudaliars / Vellalars are progressive and prosperous in the society and they are remarkably advanced in the matter of education

== Background ==
Susan Neild notes the Kondaikatti Vellalar, Thondai Mandala Saiva Vellalar / Saiva Mudaliyar as being the "predominant" subcastes of the Thondamandala Vellala. (Note: Susan Bayly has noted of the Vellalar communities generally that "they were never a tighly-knit community ... In the eighteenth and early nineteenth centuries Vellala affiliation was a vague and uncertain as that of most other south Indian caste groups. Vellala identity was certainly thought of as a source of prestige, but for that very reason there were any number of groups who sought to claim Vellala status for themselves".)They practice endogamy and have a least two subgroups themselves, being the higher-status Melnadu and the lower-ranked Kilnadu.

According to Burton Stein, She noted a link between the Thondaimandala Vellalar and the Morasu Vokkaligas of Bangalore and Kolar based on geographical proximity although two communities are distinct.

In her study concentrated on two villages in 1951-53, Kathleen Gough noted the Thondamandala Vellala subjects there to have been traditionally "landlords, warriors, and officials of the state class". She thought it likely that they had moved to their present area in Thanjavur around the 15th century when the Vijayanagaras were making incursions on their former heartland of Kanchipuram in the Pallava country. She noted those households studied as being the highest-ranked members of the village community after the Brahmins, and possibly to have in some cases increased their wealth and land by being appointed as revenue collectors for the Kingdom of Mysore when it took over the area in the period after 1780.
