= Moodley =

Moodley is an Indian surname, an alternative form of Mudaliar. Notable people with the surname include:

- Dhayendre Moodley, South African medical researcher
- Kogila Moodley, Canadian academic
- Mary Moodley (1913–1979), South African trade unionist and anti-apartheid activist
- Preshanthan Moodley (born 1988), South African film and television director
- Strini Moodley (1945–2006), South African activist

== See also ==
- Mudaliar
