= Abithana Chintamani =

Encyclopedia on Tamil literature

- Author: A. Singaravelu Mudaliar
- Language: Tamil
- Genre: Encyclopedia
- Publication date: 1899
- Publication place: India

Abithana Chintamani is an encyclopedia in Tamil language written by A. Singaravelu Mudaliar (1855 - 28 January 1931). It was the first comprehensive encyclopedia in the Tamil literature domain. The first edition, which contains a recommendation dated 1899 by V. Kanakasabai Pillai, published in 1910 and contained 1050 pages. The second edition, containing 1634 pages and includes a preface by the author's son, was published posthumously in 1934 and is available in reprinted form.

== History ==
On 14 September 1901, the Fourth Tamil Sangam, an academy dedicated to the Tamil language, was established in Madurai. It was founded by Pandithurai Thevar of the royal family of Sethupathis of Ramanathapuram. Thevar was seeking to publish an encyclopedia of Tamil literature. Meanwhile, Singaravelu Mudaliyar, a Tamil pandit working at Pachaiyappa's College, Chennai had completed such a work, but had difficulties finding a publisher. Pandithurai Thevar, upon learning about the manuscript, financially supported its publication.

In the preface, Singaravelu Mudaliyar says:

After the completion of this work, as my income as a Tamil Pandit was not sufficient to publish this elaborate work, I showed the manuscript copies of the work to many wealthy and educated gentlemen in Madras, who simply stated, without offering any help, that the publication would cost much. Then I thought of publishing it in monthly parts and to that effect published leaflets with specimen pages of my book. As very few joined as subscribers and as I feared that my attempt would be a failure, I gave up the idea.

While I was dejected and disheartened, one of my leaflets reached the hands of Sriman Pandithoraisamy Thevar, the President-Founder of Madura Tamil Sangam and Zamindar of Palavanatham, Ramnad. He came to Madras, looked into some portions of the book, and kindly consented to publish this work.

I shall not expatiate on the various troubles and difficulties that I have undergone in writing and publishing this work. The merit of this work is left to the judgement of those who may consult it as a book of reference whenever difficulties present themselves to them. My thanks are due to those gentlemen who have rendered me invaluable help with informations and with books and especially to Sriman Pandithoraisamy Thevar who has rendered me timely help in undertaking to publish this elaborate work. I wish him prosperity and success.
