= Kangeyar =

Shaivite poet and ascetic

Kangeyar was a Shaivite poet and ascetic who appears to have lived during 14th century. born in a Sengunthar Kaikola Mudaliar family of Tondaimandalam. He wrote Urichol Nigandu, a lexical work which is familiar to scholars. This lexicon was mentioned by Andipulavar in his Asiriya Nigandu. An edition of this work was published at Pondicherry in 1840, comprising only 220 stanzas but the one which was issued from the press at Jaffna in 1858 had 330 Stanzas. The lexical work unlike others of the kind, being written in the Venba metre and well adapted for beginners is used in the schools.

== See also ==
- Inbakavi
