= Mudaliar =

Title and surname used in Tamil Nadu, India

Mudaliar (alternatively spelled: Muthaliar, Mudali, Muthali, Moodley) is a Tamil title and surname. As title, it was historically given to high-ranking officers, administrators and their descendants during the rule of Imperial Cholas. The surname is most prevalent among Tamils from Tamil Nadu and Sri Lanka. Descendants of Tamil migrants also bears variants of the name in countries such as South Africa, Sri Lanka, Malaysia, Singapore and elsewhere in the Tamil diaspora.

The title is usually borne by the communities like the Kondaikatti Vellalar, Thuluva Vellalar, Senguntha Kaikolar for serving as ministers, military commanders and soldiers in Chola Empire.

== Etymology ==
The title is derived from the Tamil word muthal or "muthar" meaning first with the suffix yaar denoting people. The title Mudaliar means a person of first rank. The title is used in the same sense as simply meaning headman or chieftain.

== History ==
The term "Mudali" (or "Mudaliar") is an honorific historically associated with the Vellalar caste, specifically Vellalars settled in the northern part of Tamil Nadu, historically known as Thondaimandalam, such as Thondaimandala Vellalars and Thuluva Vellalars, who also known as Arcot Vellalar or Arcot Mudaliar, a forward caste community.

This title is also used by the Sengunthar community. Sengunthars, traditionally held a prominent place as skilled weavers and textile merchants in the Tamil region.During the rule of Imperial Cholas, the Sengunthars were warriors and were given the title "Sengunda-Mudali", indicating an evolution in their social status within Tondaimandalam society. Sengundhars are a relatively high ranking caste who rival in status the main agricultural caste, the Vellalars.

== India ==
=== Kondaikatti Vellalar ===
Kondaikatti Vellalar or Thondaimandala Mudaliar (Note: Some of the important endogamous sub-divisions among the Vellalas are: Aranbukatti, Arunattu, Cholapuram Chetti, Choliya, Dakshinattan, Kaniyalan, Karaikatta or Pandya, Kodikkal, Kongu, Kottai, Malaikanda, Nainan, Mangudi, Pandaram or Gurukal, Panjukara Chetti, Ponneri Mudali, Pundamalli Mudali, Sittak kattu Chetti, Tondamandalam Mudali or Kondaikatti, Tuluva, Uttunattu, and Yelur. The Tondaimandalam, Ponneri and Pundamalli Vellalas use the title Mudaliar;) is a Tamil (Note: Most of the Dubashes in the late eighteenth-century Madras were Telugu brahmans or Telugu perikavārs, Tamil kannakapillais, Tamil yādhavas, or Tamil Kondaikatti vellalas.) caste in south India. Historically, they were a caste of non-cultivating land-holders and some of them were administrators under various south Indian dynasties especially the Chola Empire. (Note: Among Tamil castes, both Karkattar Vellalas (Arunachalam, 1975) and Kondaikatti Vellalas (Barnett, 1970) have much the same profile as the KP: both are non-cultivating land-holders, with a history of service to ruling dynasties. Both are of high status, laying great stress on ritual purity.) (Note: Like the Kondaikatti Velalar described by Barnett(1970), they have allied themselves with south Indian dynasties as administrators, and have built up a position in the religious sphere in being employers of Brahmans and builders of temples for "high" gods like Siva, Ganesh and Vishnu.) (Note: The original stronghold of the Kondaikatti Vellalas was Tondaimandalam. Later they spread from there throughout Tamil Nadu. Some of them were employed in the king's court and others as military leaders during expansionist times.) Their original homeland was Thondaimandalam and from there they spread to other areas in south India and northeastern parts of Sri Lanka. (Note: The original home of the Kondaikatti Vellalar is Tondaimandalam and subsequently they are found throughout Tamil nadu.) Since they historically used the Mudaliar title, they are sometimes referred to as Thondaimandala Mudaliar.

=== Thuluva Vellalar ===
Thuluva Vellalar (Thondaimandala Tuluva Vellalar), also known as Agamudaya Mudaliars and Arcot Mudaliars, is a caste found in northern Tamil Nadu, southern Andhra Pradesh. They were originally significant landowners. An early Tamil tradition states that a king known as Ādonda Chakravarthi, a feudatory of Karikala Chola brought a large number of agriculturists (now known as the Tuluva Vellalas) from the Tulu areas in order to reclaim forest lands for cultivation in Thondaimandalam during late 2nd century CE. Tuluva Vellalars are progressive and prosperous in the society. They are considerably advanced in the matter of education.

=== Senguntha Kaikola Mudaliar ===
Senguntha Kaikola Mudaliar is a caste commonly found in the Indian state of Tamil Nadu, Andhra Pradesh and the neighboring country Sri Lanka. In Andhra Pradesh, they are called as Kaikala or Karikala Bhaktulu, who consider the Chola emperor Karikala Chola as their hero. They were warriors by ancient heritage and traditional, Textile Merchants and Silk Weavers by occupation. Ottakoothar, 12th century court poet and rajaguru of Cholas under Vikrama Chola, Kulothunga Chola II, Raja Raja Chola II reign belong to this community. They were a part of the Ayyavolu 500 merchant guild during the Chola period which played a significant role in the Chola invasion of Srivijaya empire. In the olden days in India, the Sengunthars were warriors and were given the title Mudaliar for their bravery. In early thirteenth century, after the fall of Chola empire large number of Kaikolars migrated to Kongu Nadu from Tondaimandalam and started doing weaving and textile businesses as their full time profession as they sworn to be soldiers only for Chola emperors.

=== In Kerala ===
The Periaveettu Mudaliars were a prominent aristocratic Vellalar family of Azhagiapandiapuram that ruled Nanchinad for a very long time. The title Mudaliar was granted to the family by the kings of Travancore.

The King of Cochin traditionally appointed a chieftain from among the Cochin Jews with the title of Mudaliar. The Mudaliars exercised civil and criminal jurisdiction over members of their community.

== Sri Lanka ==
=== Karaiyar and Sri Lankan Vellalar ===
After the expulsion of the Portuguese, the 1658 revolt against Dutch rule in the Jaffna region was led by the Christian Karaiyars and Madapallis. A Dutch minister of the 17th century, Philippus Baldaeus, described the Karaiyars, Madapallis and Vellalars among the influential classes of the Christians. Elite Karaiyars were appointed to the rank of Mudaliyars. The Karaiyar dominance got weakened through the political rise of the Vellalars under Dutch rule.

==== Karaiyar ====
For centuries the Karaiyars had sea-trade relations with India, Myanmar, Thailand, Vietnam, Malaysia and Indonesia, which has been heavily restricted since British rule.

At the hand of the powerful maritime trading clans of the Karaiyars, the emergence of urban centers known as pattanam were seen. Mudaliar (meaning "capitalist") were conferred on the maritime elite trading clans of the Karaiyars as titles of nobility.

== See also ==
- List of Mudaliars
- List of Vellalars
- List of Sengunthars
- Ceylonese Mudaliyars
- Moodley

== Sources ==
- Chanana, Karuna; Krishna Raj, Maithreyi, eds. (1989). Gender and the Household Domain Social and Cultural Dimensions. Sage Publications.
- Indian Council of Agricultural Research. Farmers of India, Band 2. Indian Council of Agricultural Research, 1961.
- Irschick, Eugene F. (1994). Dialogue and History: Constructing South India, 1795-1895. University of California Press.
- Mariola Offredi, ed. (1992). Literature, Language, and the Media in India: Proceedings of the 11th European Conference on South Asian Studies, Amsterdam, 1990, Panel 13. Manohar Publications, 1992.
- Mines, Mattison (1984). The Warrior Merchants: Textiles, Trade and Territory in South India. Cambridge University Press. ISBN 9780521267144.
- Pillay, Kolappa; Pillay, Kanakasabhapathi (1977). The Caste System in Tamil Nadu. University of Madras.
- Venkatasubramanian, T. K. (1993). Societas to Civitas Evolution of Political Society in South India : Pre-Pallavan Tamilakam. Kalinga Publications.
