= Meenakshi Srinivasan =

Indian dancer and architect (born 1971)

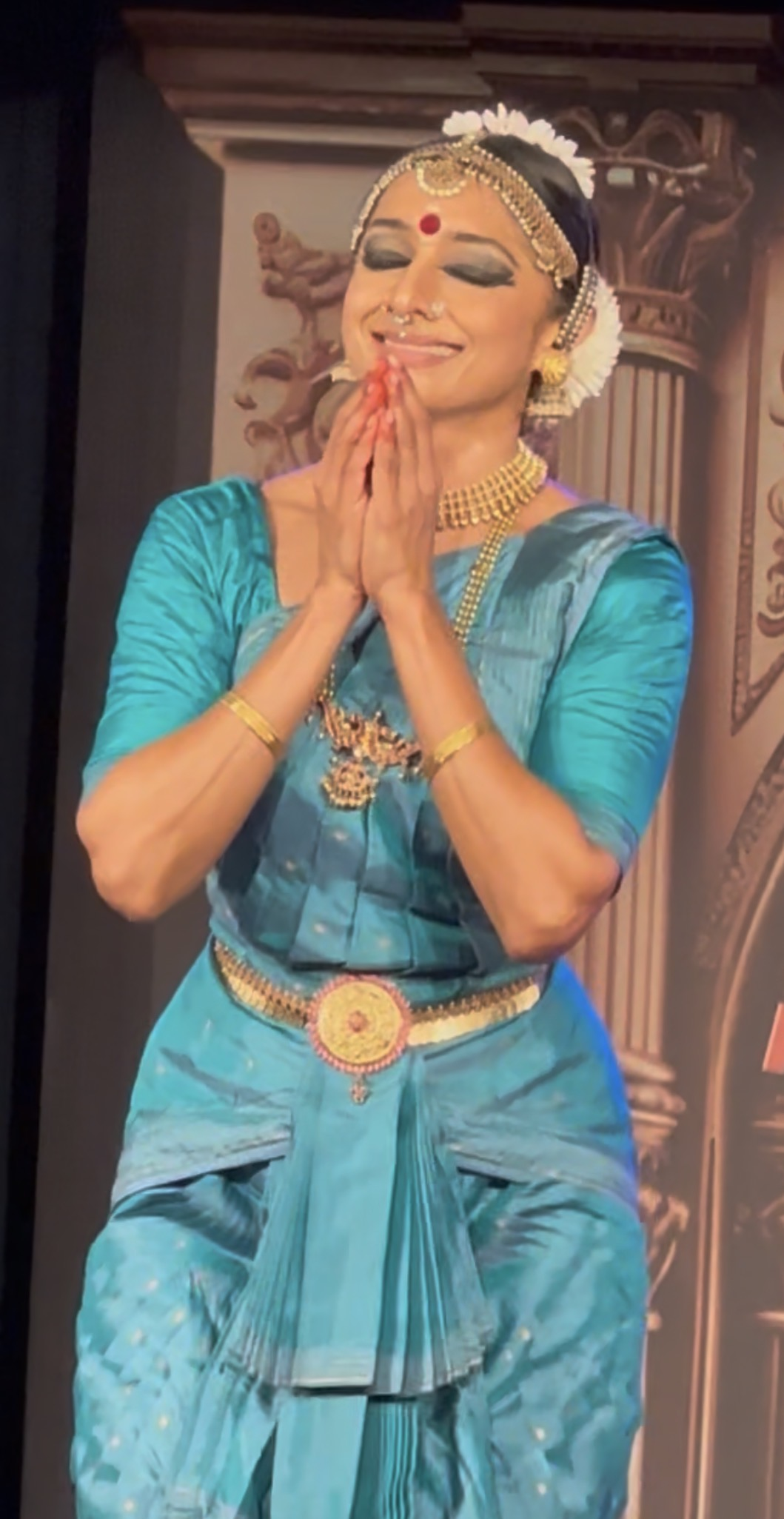
- Born: 11 June 1971; Chennai, Tamil Nadu, India
- Occupations: Dancer, Architect
- Website: https://www.meenakshisrinivasan.com

Meenakshi Srinivasan (born 11 June 1971) is an Indian classical dancer and choreographer, and an exponent of the Pandanallur style of Bharatnatyam. She trained under Alarmel Valli and is considered among the most promising soloists of the younger generation of dancers in this traditional style.

She has performed at the annual international dance festival of the Madras Music Academy, the SIFAS Festival of Indian Classical Music and Dance in Singapore, and the Musee Guimet in Paris. She received the Ustad Bismillah Khan Yuva Puraskar from Sangeet Natak Akademi in 2011.

In addition Srinivasan is a professional architect and runs a boutique architectural practice called Calm Studio in Chennai, Tamil Nadu, India.

== Early life and training ==
Born on 11 June 1971, in Chennai, Srinivasan received her training in Bharatanatyam first under Venkatachalapathy of Kalakshetra then later under Alarmel Valli.

== Career and notable performances ==
She has been featured at important sabhās in South India, such as the Madras Music Academy, Brahma Gana Sabha, Krishna Gana Sabha. and the Margazhi Festival.

She has performed in dance festivals in other parts of the country including Bangalore Habba, the Nadam Festival, the Parikrama Festival, the Shilparaman Dance Festival, Dover Lane Music Conference in Kolkata, Devdasi Festival, the Surya Festival, the Swaralaya Festival and the Nishagandhi Festival.

Internationally she has performed in the SIFAS Festival Of Indian Classical Music & Dance at the Esplanade – Theatres on the Bay in Singapore, the Singapore Repertory Theatre in Singapore; Ramli Ibrahim's Sutra Dance Theatre in Malaysia, the Gait to the Spirit festival in Vancouver, Canada, the Young Masters Festival in London, England, and the Musee Guimet in Paris, France. She has also performed in Holland and Belgium.

== Awards ==
She has received several honours in appreciation of her work. She has been acclaimed for her energy and inner power and the "measured brilliance" of her "nritta (pure dance), nritya (expressive dance) and natya (drama)" She has been conferred the titles Natya Kala Vipanchee (2007), Natya Kala Dharshini (2012) and Nrtya Abhinaya Sundaram.

Srinivasan was awarded the Ustad Bismillah Khan Yuva Puraskar of Sangeet Natak Akademi, India's National Academy for Music, Dance and Drama, in 2011 for her notable talent in the field of Bharatanatyam.
