= P. Sabanayagam =

Indian civil servant (1922–2023)

Chief Secretary to the Government of Tamil Nadu
- In office 1971–1976
- Governor: Ujjal Singh (1969–1971); K. K. Shah (1971–1976)
- Chief Minister: M. Karunanidhi

Personal details
- Born: Panchanada Sabanayagam; 7 June 1922 Madras, Madras Presidency, British India (now Chennai, Tamil Nadu, India)
- Died: 22 June 2023 (aged 101) Chennai, Tamil Nadu, India
- Children: 3, including Meenakshi Chitharanjan
- Relatives: M. Bhaktavatsalam (uncle); Palanivel Thiagarajan (nephew)
- Education: Madras Christian College (University of Madras)

Military service
- Branch/service: British Indian Army
- Years of service: 1942–1947
- Rank: Captain
- Unit: Regiment of Artillery
- Battles/wars: Second World War

Panchanada Sabanayagam (7 June 1922 – 22 June 2023) was an Indian Administrative Service officer who served as chief secretary of Tamil Nadu. As a civil servant he served under four chief ministers of Tamil Nadu including C. Rajagopalachari, K. Kamaraj, M. Bhaktavatsalam and M. Karunanidhi, and at the centre under prime minister Indira Gandhi.

== Early life ==
Sabanayagam was born in Madras (now Chennai) to S. Panchanada Mudaliar, a lawyer, on 7 June 1922. After earning an honours degree from Madras Christian College in 1942 and leaving with the college's Ross Prize, he considered graduate studies, but instead applied and was selected for a commission in the British Indian Army.

== Career ==
=== Military service ===
Sabanayagam completed basic training at the Officers' Training School, Mhow, and was then sent to Deolali Artillery School for a six-month course. On 25 June 1944, he received an emergency commission as a second lieutenant in the 10th Field Regiment of Indian Artillery, posted at Chhindwara. Impressing his commanding officer Colonel Gurney with his efficiency, Sabanayagam was promoted to war-substantive lieutenant on 25 December 1944 and received further promotion to captain in October 1945 over eight more senior lieutenants, six of whom were British. He was subsequently selected for a regular commission and a posting to the United Kingdom to attend the Long Gunnery Staff Course. As his father wished him to join the civil service, he declined the offer and relinquished his commission.

=== Civil service ===
The Indian government experienced shortages of qualified officers during the transitional period before and immediately after independence. As a consequence, Sabanayagam was appointed to the new Indian Administrative Service as a War Service Candidate on 20 March 1947, in the 1945 batch of officers. In the wake of Independence and partition on 15 August, his training was suspended while he and his fellow junior civil servants were dispatched to manage the resulting refugee crisis. He was then assigned to the Madras cadre and sent to the state in December 1947 to undergo training in district administration. He started his IAS career as a sub-collector of the Pollachi district and later of the Salem district.

Sabanayagam served in various capacities under the chief ministers of Tamil Nadu until his retirement in 1980, his most notable position being that of chief secretary from 1971 to 1976. He also served as secretary to the chief Minister, Collector of Salem, director of industries and commerce, chairman of TNEB, and First Member, Board of Revenue. With the Government of India, he served as Chief Controller, Imports and Exports, Joint secretary, Ministry of Steel and Mines, Joint secretary, Cabinet Secretariat, Secretary, department of Rehabilitation, and Secretary, Ministry of education and social welfare. As a civil servant he served under four chief ministers of Tamil Nadu C. Rajagopalachari, K. Kamaraj, M. Bhaktavatsalam and M. Karunanidhi, and at the centre under prime minister Indira Gandhi.

He turned 100 in June 2022, a milestone that was congratulated and praised by Chief Minister M. K. Stalin. An article about his birth centenary in The Times of India noted that he "led the state bureaucracy with military discipline".

== Published work(s) ==
- Sabanayagam, P. (2019). Service to the Nation. Notion Press. ISBN 978-1-68466-190-9.

== Personal life ==
Sabanayagam was married and had three children – two sons and a daughter. His daughter Meenakshi Chitharanjan, is an Indian classical danseuse. Sabanayagam's nephew is Palanivel Thiagarajan, Tamil Nadu's Minister for Information Technology and Digital Services in the M. K. Stalin ministry. On 22 June 2023, he died in Chennai at age 101.

== In popular culture ==
Sabanayagam is briefly portrayed by an uncredited actor near the end of the biopic Periyar (2007), wherein he discusses with Chief Minister Karunanidhi the arrangements for the eponymous leader's funeral.
