= A. Singaravelu Mudaliar =

Indian encyclopedist and academic (1855–1931)

A.Singaravelu Mudaliar (1855 - 28 January 1931) was an Indian encyclopedist and academic. He studied Tamil, Telugu and Sanskrit languages. He was a professor of Tamil at Pachaiyappa's College in Madras.

In 1890, he began compiling a Tamil encyclopaedia entitled Apitana Cintamani. The work in 1048 pp was published in 1910 by Madurai Tamil Sangam, and is of great value, although of very uneven quality. Its second edition, of 1634 pp., appeared in 1934. Singaravelu Mudaliar served also on the Saiva Siddhanth Committee of the Tamil Lexicon.
