= S. Kameswaran =

Indian surgeon (1923–2021)

Shanmugam Kameswaran (1923 – 26 June 2021) was a renowned ENT surgeon of Chennai, Tamil Nadu.

== Early life ==
Kameswaran was born in 1923. He had his early education in Loyola College, Chennai and Madras Medical College, Chennai. He trained in the UK where he got his FRCS from Edinburgh and Glasgow.

== Career ==
Kameswaran joined as director of the Institute of Otorhinolaryngology at the Madras Medical College. He mentored generations of ENT surgeons from various parts of the country. He also served as director of Institute of Basic Medical Sciences at Taramani of University of Madras. He also served as short term consultant of World Health Organization.

== Awards ==
The government of India honoured Kameswaran with the fourth highest civilian award, the Padma Shri Award in the year 1990. He is also a recipient of B.C. Roy award in the year 1981.

== Family ==
Kameswaran married Dr. Lalitha who is a daughter of Tamil scholar, Somasundara Bharati and a B.C. Roy Awardee (1983). Mrs. Lalitha Kameswaran was the first vice-chancellor of The Tamilnadu Dr.M.G.R. Medical University, Chennai in the year 1988. Mohan Kameswaran who is the managing director and chief surgeon of Madras ENT Research Foundation, Chennai, is the son of Mr and Mrs Kameswaran and their daughter is Chitra Sankaran who is a Professor of English at National University of Singapore.

== Death ==
At 98 years old, Kameswaran died due to old age on 26 June 2021 at Chennai.
