= Alarmel Valli =

Indian dancer

Chevalière Alarmel Valli
- Born: 14 September 1956 (age 70); Madras, Madras state, India
- Education: Bachelor of Arts in Literature
- Alma mater: The Sacred Heart Matriculation School, Church Park, Madras Stella Maris
- Occupations: Indian classical dancer, choreographer
- Known for: Pandanallur style of Bharatnatyam
- Spouse: Bhaskar Ghose
- Awards: Padma Bhushan; Padma Shri
- Website: alarmelvalli.org

Alarmel Valli (born 14 September 1956) is an Indian classical dancer and Bharatanatyam-Pandanallur choreographer.

She founded The Dipasikha Dance Foundation in Chennai in 1984, where she teaches Bharatanatyam.

In 1991, Valli became the second youngest dancer to receive the Padma Shri from the Government of India, after Vyjayanthimala. She was later awarded the Sangeet Natak Akademi Award in 2001 by India's National Academy for Music, Dance and Drama, followed by the Padma Bhushan award from the Government of India in 2004 and the Chevalier of des Arts and Letters award from the Government of France, also in 2004.

== Career ==
She made her stage debut at 9 ½ at The Indian Institute of Fine Arts, Madras, where she was conferred the Natya Kala Bhushan award. She won her laurels on the international scene when she was barely 16 at the International Dance Festival of the prestigious Sarah Bernhardt Théâtre de la Ville in Paris and has performed in landmark theatres and festivals ever since, both in India and abroad.

Her research into classical Tamil literature and the anthologies of the 2000-year-old Sangam poetry has resulted in a significant repertoire of dance poems. Over the years, she has developed a distinct style within the framework of classical Bharatanatyam.

Among her leading students are Ranee Ramaswamy and Aparna Ramaswamy of the Ragamala Dance Company in Minneapolis and Meenakshi Srinivasan.

Some highlights of Alarmél Valli's international career include her performances at the Bolshoi Theatre, the Vienna International Dance Festival, The Munich Opera Festival, The Edinburgh Festival, the New York International Festival of Arts, The Avignon Festival, The Cervantino Festival, the Lyon Biennale, the Venice Biennale, The Royal Albert Hall and Queen Elizabeth Hall in London, the Helsinki Biennale, the Millennium Festival in Berlin and The Frankfurt Alt Oper. In July 2015, she was the first Indian classical dancer to perform at the Salzburg Festival.

== In popular culture ==
A film about Alarmel Valli was made for the Omnibus series, on BBC One, by producer Michael Macintyre. Alarmel Valli has also been featured in dance documentaries by noted Indian producers like the late G. Aravindan and Prakash Jha, by the BBC (in The Spirit of Asia Series), the Netherlands Broadcasting Company, Arte (France), and Japanese National Television. The Films Division of India commissioned a film, titled 'Pravahi', on her for the National Archives of India. It was directed by eminent filmmaker Arun Khopkar, with cinematography by Madhu Ambat. In 2011, Lasya Kavya, a documentary about Alarmel Valli by award-winning director, Sankalp Meshram, won the National Film Award for Best Arts/Cultural Film.

== Personal life & education ==
Alarmel Valli was born 14th of September 1956, in Madras, Madras state, into the Chunampet family. Valli's grandfather; Dewan Bahadur C. Arunachala Mudaliyar and her great-grandfather was Chunampet Muttukumarasami Mudaliyar.

Valli is married to Bhaskar Ghose, an Indian Administrative Service (IAS) officer.

== Selected awards and honours ==
- 1979: State award of Kalaimamani from Tamil Nadu Government
- 1980: Nrithya Vikas, from Sur Singar, Mumbai
- 1985: Nritya Choodamani, from Krishna Gana Sabha, Chennai.
- 1991: Padma Sri from the Government of India.
- 1997: Awarded the Grande Medaille (Medal) by the City of Paris.
- 2001: Sangeet Natak Akademi Award, New Delhi
- 2004: Padma Bhushan from the Government of India
- 2004: Chevalier of Arts and Letters award from the Government of France
- 2012: Naatya Padmam from Brahma Gana Sabha, Chennai
- 2014: Natya Utsav Lifetime Achievement Award from the Bharatiya Vidya Bhavan, Chennai
- 2015: Natya Kala Acharya award from The Music Academy, Chennai
- 2018: Nritya Peroli award from Karthik Fine Arts, Chennai

== See also ==
- Bharatnatyam
- Indian women in dance
