= Tara Chaudhri =

Indian dancer

Tara Chaudhri was an exponent of Indian classical dance. Believed to have hailed from Lahore, she trained under different maestros of dance, and went on to be acclaimed for her versatility and contributions to the dance forms of Kathak, Manipuri, Kathakali and Bharathnatyam. She was described as the "Pavlova of Punjab" and earned acclaim and respect from international contemporaries.

== Early life ==
She traveled to South India in 1943 to train further in South Indian dance forms of Kathakalli. Her initiation to Bharathnatyam remains a bit of a mystery, as per some accounts she might have learned the dance during her stay in South India, but according to a 1942 pamphlet, she ran a dance school and taught ‘Bharata Natya’ in Lahore, the cultural capital of North India before Independence. She is known to have trained under Guru Meenakshisundaram Pillai, considered as the prominent founder of Pandanallur style of Bharatanatyam, Indian dance.

== Tours and recognition ==
As the principal dance partner of Ram Gopal, an Indian modernist dancer and choreographer, she traveled throughout India and Ceylon. Her natural grace and supple movements, along with an ability to express a repertoire of emotions awed audiences and garnered acclaim from art critics, though her modernist style was criticized by some.

Tara Chaudhri is, perhaps, even greater than Russia’s Anna Pavlova. Her sense of time and rhythm is perfect and her wonderful mastery of the various styles of Indian dancing puts her in a class by herself

— attributed to Vallathol

== Later years ==
She founded and maintained a dancing school in Madras for a few years. She trained her students and worked on introducing new ballets and numbers based on traditional dance techniques. She also envisioned the establishment of a Dance University in India, which would focus on research and propagation of Indian folk and classical dancing in its myriad forms
