= Makaral Karthikeya Mudaliar =

Indian scholar and poet

Makaral Karthikeya Mudaliar (1857–1916) was an Indian scholar and poet of Tamil ancestry Thondaimandala Vellalar from Veyttur, near Madurantakam in the state of Tamil Nadu.

Mudaliar authored Velir varalaatru maanbu, Aathichudi Muthar Viruthiyurai, Tamil Solvilakkam, and Mozhi nool.
