= T. M. Jambulingam Mudaliar =

Indian activist and politician (1890–1970)

Rao Bahadur T. M. Jambulingam Mudaliyar
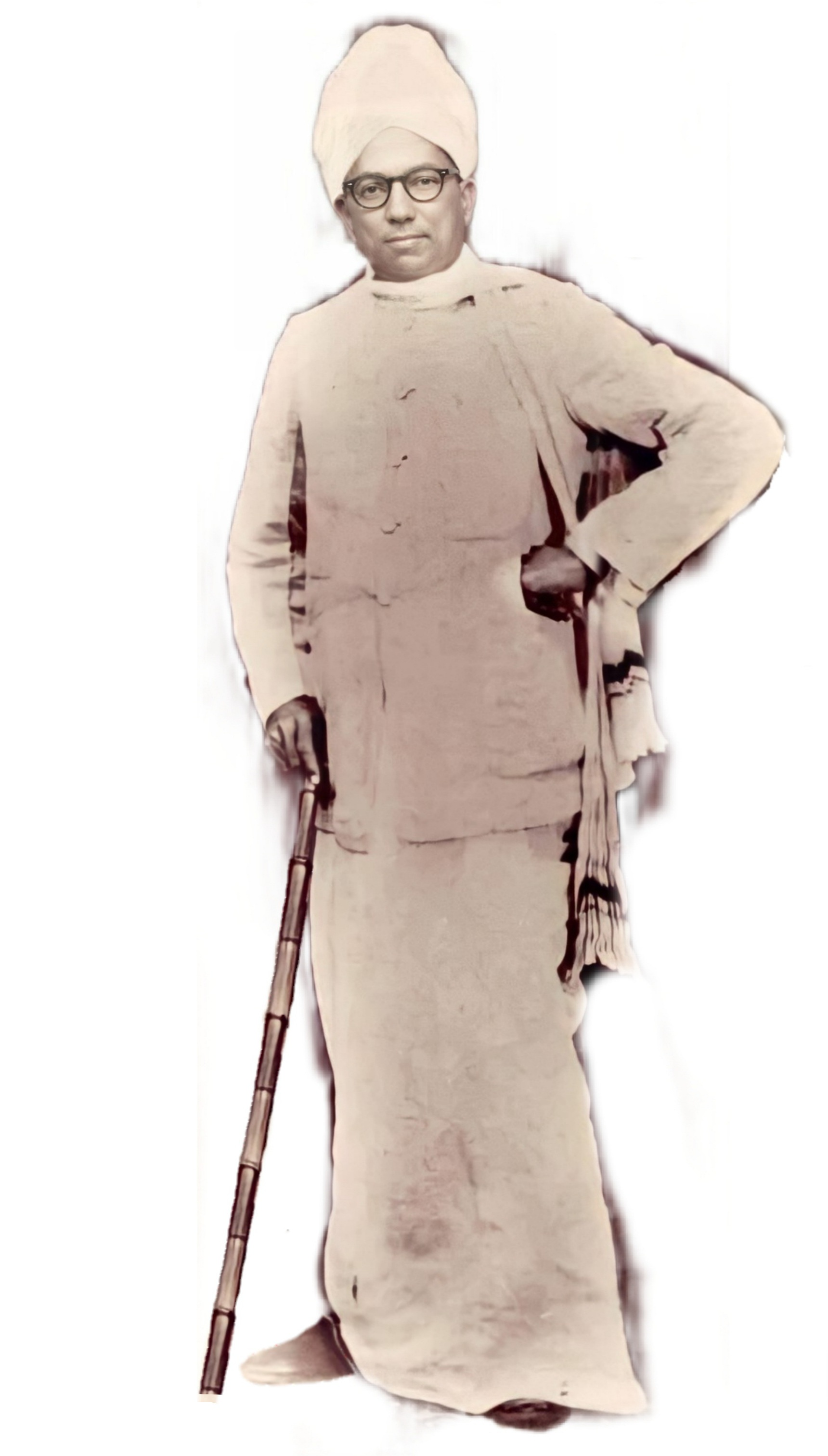
- Born: Jambulingam Mudaliyar; 22 June 1890; Thirukandeeswaram, South Arcot district, British India
- Died: 28 October 1970 (aged 80)
- Occupation(s): Philanthropist, politician, farmer, freedom fighter, textile merchant
- Spouse: Vijaylashmi
- Parent: Mirasdar T.V. Masillamani Mudaliyar - Sornambal

Rao Bahadur T. M. Jambulingam Mudaliar (22 June 1890 – 28 October 1970) was an Indian philanthropist, politician, landlord and freedom fighter. He discovered the presence of lignite Coal in the Neyveli region and donated several hundred acres of his own land to establish the NLC India Limited. He was considered as father of Neyveli and Cuddalore region.

== Early life ==
Jambulingam Mudaliyar was born in 1890 in a Sengunthar family in Thirukandeeswaram, a village in present Cuddalore district to a wealthy landlord T.V. Masilamani Mudaliar and Sornambal. He had his studies in Cuddalore and Madras.

In 1911, he married Vijayalakshmi Ammal and they had six daughters.

== Career ==
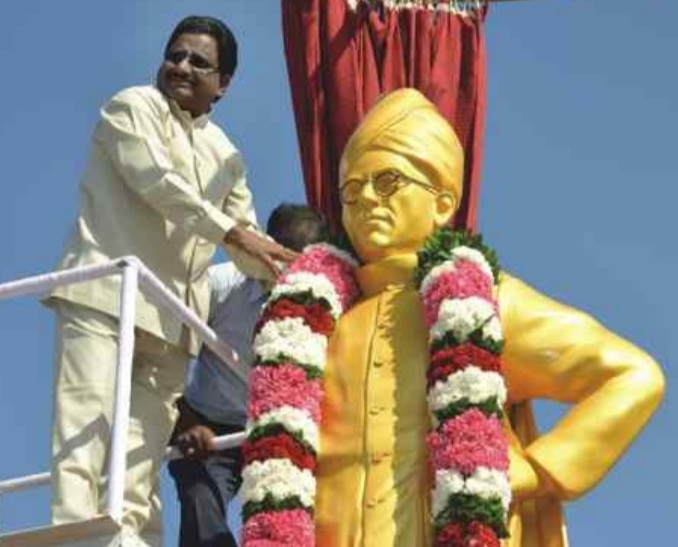
Statue of Rao Bahadur T. M. Jambulingam Mudaliar

Mudaliar was a committed educationist, a land lord, a prominent citizen and a progressive farmer.

He served as the chairman of Cuddalore Municipality, President of South Arcot District board, weaver's cooperative, Nellikuppam Co-operative Supervising Union. He has repeatedly provided financial assistance to the Indian independence struggle.

He served as Vice president of South Arcot district leprosy Council and Cuddalore Municipality. He served as director and member Of South Arcot district Co operative Central Bank executive Committee. He served Member of the Senates of University of Madras and Annamalai University to develop higher education among Indians.

Mudaliar served as member of Madras provincial Road way Board and Member of South India Railway Advisory Committee.

He served municipal Councillor of Cuddalore for many decades.

He served as member of South Arcot district Secondary Education Board and Advisory Committee Quarters Hospital of Cuddalore.

Jambulinga Mudaliar and his brother Palanisamy Mudaliar donated several lakh rupees worth of work on the Cuddalore Pataleeswarar Temple and the Thirukandeswaram Natanapadeswarar Temple during the British period. He had also been the trustee of many temples and President of South Arcot District Hindu temple development Committee, Zilla Board.

He visited Cuddalore Prison as an unofficial visitor and assisted in various ways for the rehabilitation of the inmates there.

He was a member of Cosmopolitan Club Cuddalore and president of Nellikuppam Panchayat Board for more than 20 years. The Nellikuppam sugar mill was started by him when he was the Nellikuppam Presented. He was fully involved in building the bridge across the Bhuvanagiri Vellar river at his own expense and obtained permission from the government to build the bridge for the public.

The British government arrested some of the peoples of Vembur Paraiyar and Piramalai Kallar under the Criminal Tribes Act and formed the Aziz Nagar settlement in the Southern District and jailed these people in this settlement. The oppressed people in the Aziz Nagar settlement were without even basic facilities and food. Jambulinga Mudaliar visited the aziz nagar settlement unofficially and provided food and basic necessities to the affected people there. Jambulinga Mudaliar vehemently opposed the Criminal Tribes Act and only the Criminal Tribes Act against the Vanniyar Padayachi of the South Arcot was repealed.

He approached the government in several ways to build the Salem to Cuddalore railway line, but the government could only give permission to build the Salem-Cuddalore railway line if there were at least 50 people daily on the Cuddalore-Salem bus service for a year. Jambulinga Mudaliar, who believed that the two districts would prosper if the Salem-Cuddalore railway line was built, finally got the Salem-Cuddalore railway project by after having Jambulinga Mudaliar's 50 servants travel on buses on the Salem-Cuddalore route for a year at Mudaliar's own expense.

== Foundation of Neyveli Lignite Corporation ==
When Jambulingam Mudaliar dug a new well for water on his own Neyveli village farm land, the black liquid was mixed with water. He sent it to the attention of the then British Government Geography Department but the Government did not look into it. He then carried out research at his own expense and discovered the presence of coal.

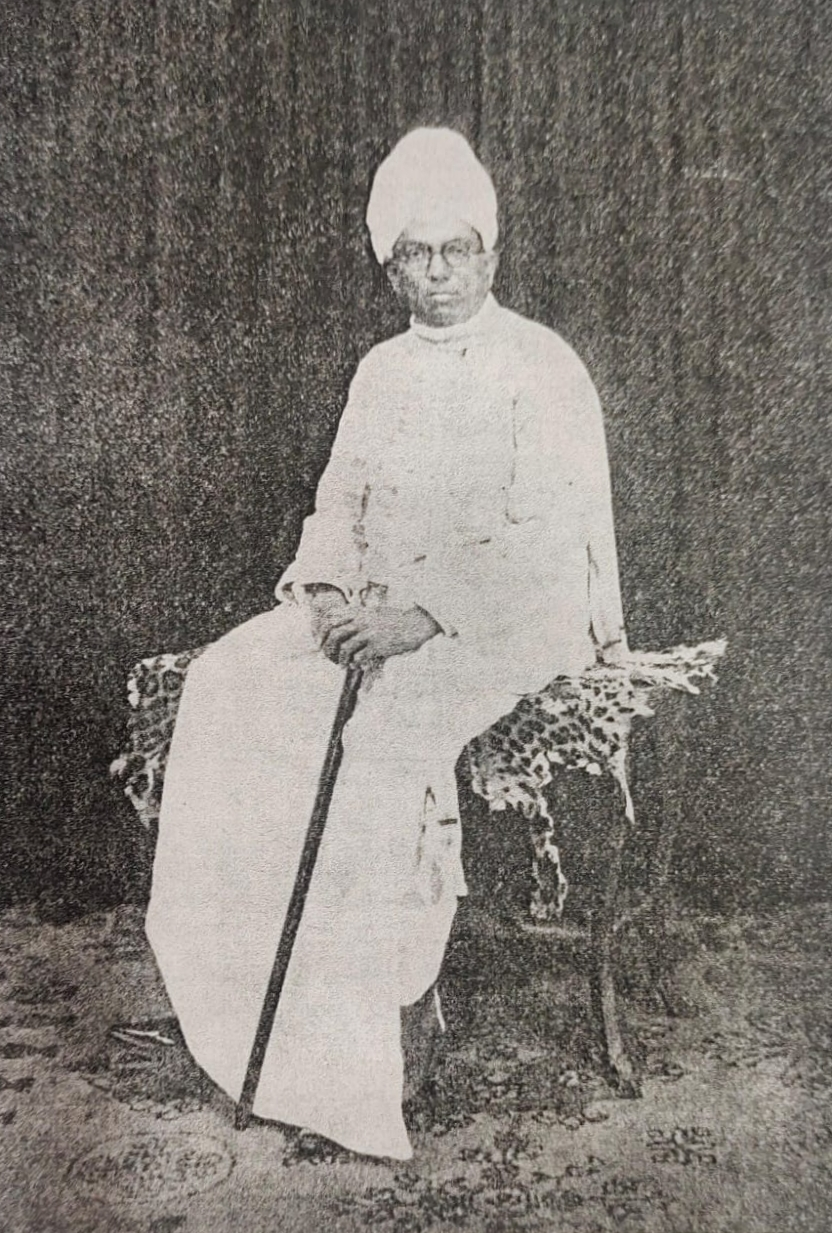
A photo of T. M. Jambulingam Senguntha Mudaliar

After the independence of India, he approached the then Madras Chief Minister Rajaji and explained the existence of this coal. The government, however, did not investigate it. K. Kamaraj then approached Chief Minister and explained to him that he had met Nehru, the then Prime Minister of India, through Kamaraj and explained to him. The central government has said it cannot help the company as it needed Rs 150 crore to start the company. Aware of this, Jambulingam Mudaliar announced that he would donate 620 acres of land required for the establishment of the Neyveli Coal Mining Company to the Kamaraj-led State Government.

The Kamaraj-led state government set up the Neyveli Lignite Corporation Limited without the help of the central government as the land required for the company was donated by Jambulingam Mudaliar. The 620 acres of land donated by Jambulingam Mudaliar to Neyveli Lignite Corporation (NLC) is worth Rs 2,500 crore today.

Today, 90 percent of South India's electricity needs is generated by thermal power plants. All the brown coal required for these South Indian thermal power plants is sourced from the Neyveli lignite Corporation.

The Neyveli lignite Corporation and Thermal Power Station employ 50,000 workers. The company has a turnover of several lakh crores of rupees.

== Honors ==
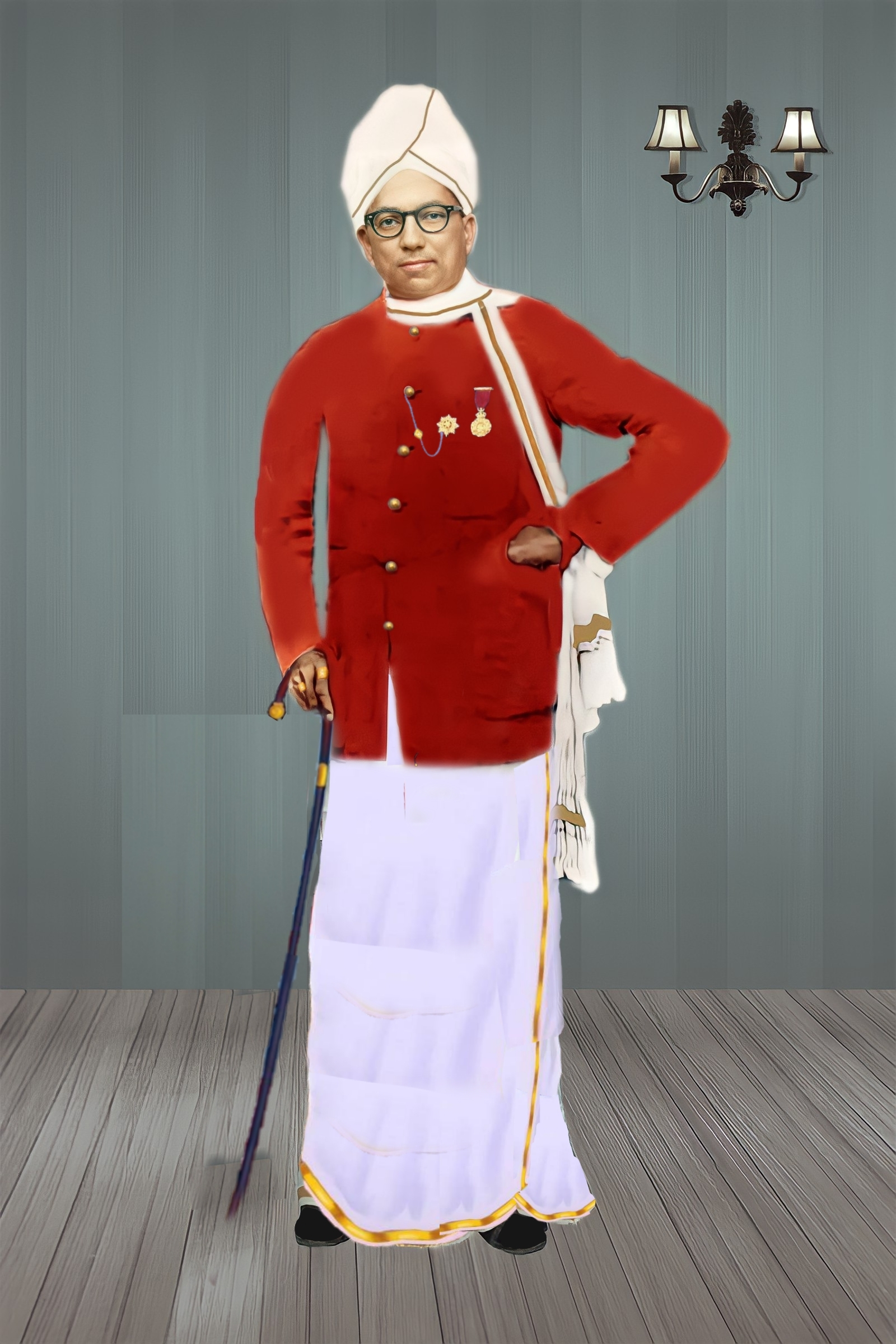
T. M. Jambulingam Mudaliyar with Rao Bhadur medal

Jambulingam Mudaliar had a great zeal for the spread of literacy among rural population. He occupied many important government posts. To honour his services, the British Government conferred Rao Bahadur Award to Shri Jambilingam Mudaliar in June 1934.

The Neyveli residence has a full-length statue and a road named after him in his honor. Nellikuppam Park, built on the land donated by him, is known as Jambulingam Park. The "Nellikuppam Naduveerappattu" road built with his material help is called Jambulingam Road.

There was a debate in the Indian Parliament in 2017 that the government did not pay due respect to Jambulinga Mudaliar & family who donated assets worth Rs 2,000 crore to the government.
