= Erode Fort =

- Part of Tamil Nadu
- Erode, Tamil Nadu, India

Site information
- Type: Forts
- Controlled by: Government of Tamil Nadu
- Condition: Ruins

Location
- Coordinates: 11.35°N 77.73°E

Erode Fort was a fort in Erode, India. Francis Buchanan described it in 1800 as being

... a large mud fort, occupied by a battalion of Sepoys, which, in this part of the country, now procures a ready supply of recruits... In the government of [Hyder Ali] the suburb contained about 3000 houses. [Tipu Sultan’s] government had reduced them one third part, and the whole was entirely destroyed during the invasion of General Meadows.

This Fort was built by the then Chieftain of Erode region, King Chandramathi Mudaliar.
