= Pandanallur style =

Style of Bharatanatyam dance

The Pandanallur style is a style of Bharatanatyam Indian dance. It is mainly attributed to Meenakshisundaram Pillai (1869–1964), a dance guru who lived in the village of Pandanallur, in the Thanjavur district in the south Indian state of Tamil Nadu.

== Style ==
The Pandanallur style developed a reputation for the emphasis on linear geometry that can be found in the adavu technique, and for its intensity and understatement in abhinaya.

The Pandanallur style is renowned for its choreography, which include such highly regarded pieces as the Nine or Ten Tanjore Quartet pada-varnams. These works featured choreography by Pillai, who named the dramatic choreography "hands," and was also responsible for the adavu choreography for the swara passages.

Part of their heritage is the valuable jatiswarams (in ragams Vasantha, Saveri, Chakravakam, Kalyani, Bhairavi), which incorporate abstract adavu choreography.

Pandanallur style gives a lot of importance to abinayaha. Moreover, stamping the foot hard against the floor is discouraged in this style. Instead, slow movements are used to make the salangai (ankle bells) give out a lot of sound. The strong footwork, where every step is marked, is a result of the style's main features of exactness and accuracy to bring out rhythmic vitality, as the dancer is required to have a natural rhythmic body of expression.

== Teachers ==
Meenakshisundaram Pillai, whose ancestors were nattuvanars, was a descendant from the Thanjavur Quartet, which comprised four brothers: Chinnaiah, Ponniah, Sivanandam and Vadivel. The works of these four brothers, who were court composers in the early 19th century in Thanjavur, form the main classical masterpieces of Bharata Natyam.

Baroda Guru Kubernath Tanjorkar (1916 - 2007), a disciple of Pillai, later established Tanjor Dance Music & Art Research Centre in Baroda, Gujarat. Thiruvallaputhur Swaminatha Pillai, also known as T.K.Swaminatha Pillai, was one of the leading disciples of Pillai. He learned Bharathanatiyam under the Gurukula of Pillai for more than ten years. He also mentored Ram Gopal, who became one of the pioneers of Indian dance in the west.

Pillai was said to have been trained by his uncle, Kumarasamy Nattuvanar. He trained several famous Bharata Natyam dancers, including Devadasis such as Pandanallur Jayalakshmi, Thangachi Ammal, Sabaranjitam, as well as people from other castes such as Mrinalini Sarabhai, Rukmini Devi, Tara Chaudhri.

After Pillai, his son-in-law Chokkalingam Pillai (1893–1968) became the doyen Guru of the Pandanallur style. His leading dancer-student was Mambalam Geetha. He trained other leading dancers such as G. Kausalya, Sucharita, and Indrani Rehman. He shifted to Madras and propagated his dance throughout the region.

Subbaraya Pillai (1914–2008), Chokkalingam Pillai's son, was the next leading Guru of the Pandanallur style. He grew up in the village of Pandanallur and was an apprentice under his grandfather and father. He trained leading dancers such as Alarmel Valli and Meenakshi Chitharanjan. His granddaughter Vanitha Rajasekar teaches dance in Valasaravakkam, Chennai-87 and other regions of Tamil Nadu.
