= Thanikachalam Sadagopan =

Indian cardiologist

- Born: 13 December 1939 (age 86); Tamil Nadu, India
- Occupation: Cardiologist
- Known for: Preventive cardiology
- Awards: Padma Shri; Dr. B. C. Roy Award
- Website: www.urheartourdr.org

Thanikachalam Sadagopan is an Indian cardiologist, medical academic, and former Vice-Chancellor at the Sri Ramachandra University. He is the chairman and director of the Cardiac Care Centre at Sri Ramachandra University and an adjunct professor at the Biomedical Engineering Group of the Department of Applied Mechanics at the Indian Institute of Technology, Chennai. He is known for research on preventive cardiology and has published several articles on the subject. He has been involved in several multinational multicentric drug trials including the PURSE-HIS Epidemiological Study of the Tufts University School of Medicine and the study on Nuna Kadugu, a Siddha medicine used to treat various skin diseases. He is a recipient of Dr. B. C. Roy Award of the Medical Council of India, the highest Indian award in the medical category. The Government of India awarded him the fourth highest civilian honour of the Padma Shri, in 2009, for his contributions to Medicine.

== See also ==
- Sri Ramachandra Medical College and Research Institute
