= Mahavidwan Vasudeva Mudaliar =

Mahavidwan Vasudeva Mudaliar was a renowned poet from Chettipalayam near Pothanur in Coimbatore District. His poetic verse called Thalapuranam in praise of The Lord Skanda is at Thirumuruganpoondi
