= Dhayendre Moodley =

South African scientist

- Scientific career
- Fields: Prevention of HIV transmission from mothers to their babies
- Institutions: University of KwaZulu-Natal

Dhayendre Moodley is a South African medical researcher and Associate Professor at the University of KwaZulu-Natal. She has worked as an investigator in Phase II and III international clinical trials exploring antiretroviral regimens to prevent HIV transmission from mother to child.

== Career ==
She received an Elizabeth Glaser Pediatric AIDS Foundation fellowship to work with John Sullivan at his laboratory. She is a member of the Academy of Science of South Africa. Over 100 journal papers have been co-authored by Moodley.

== Research ==
Dhayendre Moodley conducts research in the field of obstetrics with particular expertise in HIV in pregnant women.
