= Irattaipulavar =

Irattaipulavar (meaning The twin poets) or Irattaiyar were brothers born in Alandurai of Chola Nadu during 14th century in the Sengunthar Kaikola Mudaliar community . The elder, called Mudhusuriyar 'Old Sun' was born lame; the younger, Ilanjchuriyar 'Young Sun,' was blind. They went about as wanderers, the blind man carrying his lame brother on the shoulders, complementing each other in poetry as in life, one man completing extempore what the other began. They were contemporaries of Kalamegam.

== Literary works ==
There were hundreds of tanippatals (meaning solitary stanzas) composed by The Twins in this way to meet about emergencies. They had composed Ekambaranatharula celebrating the famous Saiva shrine in Kanchi, the Tillaikkalampakam of 100 stanzas, added with kappuvenpa on Lord Nataraja of Chidambaram, which was interesting and important for the history of the Tamil language. Their Amatturkkalampakam contains 101 stanzas apart from a kappuviruttam.

== Sources ==
Tamil literature, Volume 2, Part 1 By Kamil Zvelebil
