= Inbakavi =

Inbakavi (baptised Xavier Henric Leam) was a Tamil poet and dramatist

== Personal life ==
Inbakavi was born Xavier Henric Leam at Manapparai in Tirunelveli district. His parents belonged to the Parava caste. At a young age, Inbakavi obtained the patronage of Don Gabriel Vaz Gomez, the Parava chieftain of Tuticorin and approached the king of Ettaiyapuram. Initially, he found himself unwelcome, but he soon impressed the king by penning a poem in praise of the Raja. The king bestowed many gifts upon him.

After staying for a short period at the court of the Raja, Inbakavi set out for the court of Serfoji II of Thanjavur. At Thanjavur, he impressed the minister Tatooji who developed a special liking for him. However, poor health forced Inbakavi to leave for Tuticorin after a short stay.

In his later life, Inbakavi also toured Jaffna and Colombo. However, respect for the poet had greatly diminished due to his habit of drinking, which also destroyed his health. Before he quit Jaffna, however, Inbakavi penned a drama Kuruvanji in praise of his benefactor Philip Rodrigo Muttukrishna.

Inbakavi died in 1835.

== Works ==
Inbakavi penned a number of dramas and Tamil poems. He wrote Christian as well as Saivite and Vaishnavite hymns.
