= Kondaikatti Vellalar =

Tamil caste found in south India

Regions with significant populations
- Tamil Nadu, India

Languages
- Tamil

Religion
- Hinduism, Jainism

Related ethnic groups
- Tamil people

Kondaikatti Velaalar or Thondaimandala Mudaliar (Note: Some of the important endogamous sub-divisions among the Vellalas are: Aranbukatti, Arunattu, Cholapuram Chetti, Choliya, Dakshinattan, Kaniyalan, Karaikatta or Pandya, Kodikkal, Kongu, Kottai, Malaikanda, Nainan, Mangudi, Pandaram or Gurukal, Panjukara Chetti, Ponneri Mudali, Pundamalli Mudali, Sittak kattu Chetti, Tondamandalam Mudali or Kondaikatti, Tuluva, Uttunattu, and Yelur. The Tondaimandalam, Ponneri and Pundamalli Vellalas use the title Mudaliar;) is a Tamil (Note: Most of the Dubashes in the late eighteenth-century Madras were Telugu brahmans or Telugu perikavārs, Tamil kannakapillais, Tamil yādhavas, or Tamil Kondaikatti vellalas.) high-ranking subcaste of the Vellalar caste in south India. Historically, they were a caste of non-cultivating land-holders and some of them were administrators under various south Indian dynasties. (Note: Among Tamil castes, both Karkattar Vellalas (Arunachalam, 1975) and Kondaikatti Vellalas (Barnett, 1970) have much the same profile as the KP: both are non-cultivating land-holders, with a history of service to ruling dynasties. Both are of high status, laying great stress on ritual purity.) (Note: Like the Kondaikatti Velalar described by Barnett(1970), they have allied themselves with south Indian dynasties as administrators, and have built up a position in the religious sphere in being employers of Brahmans and builders of temples for "high" gods like Siva, Ganesh and Vishnu.) (Note: The original stronghold of the Kondaikatti Vellalas was Tondaimandalam. Later they spread from there throughout Tamil Nadu. Some of them were employed in the king's court and others as military leaders during expansionist times.) Their original homeland was Thondaimandalam and from there they spread to other areas in south India and northeastern parts of Sri Lanka. (Note: The original home of the Kondaikatti Vellalar is Tondaimandalam and subsequently they are found throughout Tamil nadu.) Since they historically used the Mudaliar title, they are sometimes referred to as Thondaimandala Mudaliar. However, Kathleen Gough considers them to be a separate subcaste of the Thondaimandala Mudali, as does Susan Neild.

== Etymology ==
The earliest occurrence of the term Velaalar (வேளாளர்) in Sangam literature is in Paripadal where it is used in the sense of a landowner. The term Velaalar (வேளாளர்) can be derived from the word Vel (வேள்), Vel being a title that was borne by the Velir chieftains of Sangam age among other things.

The word Vellalar (வெள்ளாளர்) may come from the root Vellam for flood, which gave rise to various rights of land; and it is because of the acquisition of land rights that the Vellalar got their name.

The word Kondaikatti was used to denote someone who bound his hair up in a tuft on top of the head.

== History ==
Velaalar in the ancient Tamil society were of two kinds, the Uzhuthunbor or those who eat by ploughing their fields and the Uzhuvithunbor, that is those who ate by getting their fields ploughed by tenant cultivators. The Kondaikatti Velaalar belonged to the latter group, that is they were landlords. The Kondaikatti Velaalar are natives of Thondaimandalam. (Note: According to the Vellala puranas, the kondai-katti Vellalas had been earlier residents of Tondaimandalam than the chozhiya Vellalas who had accompanied Atandai from the Chola country. The claim is lent credibility by the fact that the complex organizational structures like ur and sabha are epigraphically recorded prior to the reign of Surya Chola.)

=== British Colonial period ===
During the Colonial era, this landed gentry were known as Mirasidars, named after the Arabic/Urdu term mirasi. The mirasi system was similar to a co-operative society where lands in a village were collectively owned by a group of people called Mirasdars. The Mirasidars were entitled to a share of the agricultural produce based upon the percentage of ownership. Some of the Kondaikatti Velaalar were employed as dubashes, literally, a person who could speak two languages, in the Company. When the British took over the Jagir, that is the agrarian area of the Thondaimandalam region, in the late eighteenth century (1782 CE), these Mirasidars and Dubashes put up a sustained and effective fight to thwart British attempts to control and collect taxes from this region. Historian Eugene Irschick who did a study on the nature of the political society of the Thondaimandalam region between 1795 CE and 1895 CE notes:

"Many of these Kondaikatti vellala Dubashes were connected by kinship to Kondaikatti vellala Mirasdars in the Poonamallee and other rural areas of the Jagir. In contemporary documents these Kondaikattis were knowns as Mudalis-later lengthened to "Mudaliyar"-a term that literally meant a person of first rank. However, in the view of many of the Company officers, the term "Mudali" carried a pejorative meaning. Mudalis were despised by the British because they were considered both essential actors and great threats to individual British and Company operations."

As a direct result of this confrontation and hostile British policy, many of the Kondaikatti Velaalar were persecuted and eventually lost their mirasi rights and ownership of their lands. They were systematically replaced by tenants from other castes who were essentially outsiders and strangers to the Thondaimandalam country. Those tenants who were amenable to British rule and who were willing to abide by British taxation laws were gradually given more rights from the time of tax collector Lionel Place (1794 CE) and were eventually made Mirasidars. Since the taxes were directly proportional to the produce, the British also deemed all uncultivated land regardless of ownership as Company property and redistributed these lands to those who were willing to cultivate and pay taxes .

== Caste structure ==
The caste is divided into a number of unranked patrilineal exogamous clans called gotras. In addition, the caste is composed of four hierarchically ranked endogamous units called Vakaiyaras (varieties or kindreds). The members belonging to the higher Vakaiyaras will not interdine, intermarry or accept food or water from the lower Vakaiyaras. The Vakaiyaras comprise the same gotras and span across multiple village clusters. In the late 1920s, the more progressive members advocated the abrogation of the Vakaiyara system and after much deliberation, the caste passed a resolution to drop it.

== Religion ==
Some of the Kondaikatti Velaalar were originally Jains. The significant portion of the Saiva Velaalar social group, to which the Kondaikatti Velaalar belong, are also believed to have been Jainas before they embraced Hinduism although the majority of the group are followers of Saivism. (Note: It is also widely believed that certain sections of the Saiva Vellalas of Madras State who are stricter vegetarians than even Tamil Brahmins, were Jainas.) The Tamil Jains referred by the Saiva Velaalar as nīr-pūci-nayinārs or nīr-pūci-vellalars meaning the Jains (Nayinars) who left Jainism and adopted Shaivism by smearing (pūci) the sacred ash or (tiru)-nīru.

== Varna Classification ==
During the British colonial period, the Vellalars who were land owners and tillers of the soil and held offices pertaining to land, were ranked as Sat-Shudra in the 1901 census; with the Government of Madras recognising that the 4-fold division (four varnas) did not describe the South Indian, or Dravidian, society adequately.

While the Shudras are described as the slaves of the other three Varna, the Vellalas are not described in such terms in the Tolkappiyam (Velaan Maanthar) or in other Sangam literature (Paripaadal). Moreover, the Varna system is essentially a Hindu classification system that categorises people hierarchically whereas certain section of the Kondaikatti Vellalar were originally Jains.

Dr. Kamala Ganesh, former Professor and Head of Department of Sociology at the University of Mumbai, states in her research that the Varna classification does not apply to certain sections like the Kondaikatti Velaalar. She further notes:

"Barnett's detailed work (1970) on the Kondaikatti Vellalas defines them, both transactionally and attributionally, as a combination of the brahmanical and kshatriya models. This finding reflects a historically established fact, viz., in South India, vegetarian Vellalas, a sizeable and influential segment of the population do not fit into the four varna scheme and have constituted what could perhaps be called a parallel classical tradition which is both distinct from and overlaps with the orthodox sanskritic tradition."

The Kondaikatti Vellalar are one of the six ancient vegetarian Vellalar castes of Tamil nadu.

== Caste-based Reservation Status ==
The Kondaikatti Vellalar do not avail any benefits under the reservation quota for Backward castes.

== Notable people ==
- Sir P. T. Rajan, politician and former Chief Minister of Madras Presidency.
- Palanivel Thiagarajan, Minister in the current Tamil Nadu assembly.
- C. N. Muthuranga Mudaliar, former politician and Independence activist.
- M. Bhakthavatsalam, politician and former Chief Minister of Madras state.
- Sarojini Varadappan, social activist.
- Jayanthi Natarajan, former Minister and Member of Parliament, Tamil Nadu.
- M. B. Nirmal, founder and chairman of Exnora International
