= Chandramathi Mudaliar =

17th-century Tamil chieftain

Chandramathi Mudaliar was a 17th-century Tamil chieftain and ruler of south Kongu Nadu (Erode region) who fought many battles against the Madurai Nayak

Erode Fort was built by Chandramathi Mudaliar and his family. Later it was destroyed by the British.

Chandramathi Mudaliyar was in the genealogy of Senguntha therinja Kaikolar Padai.
