= C. Muttukumarasami Mudaliyar =

Indian politician

Chunampet Muttukumarasami Mudaliyar was the hereditary zamindar of Chunampet in Chingleput district and politician who served as a member of the Madras Legislative Council for three consecutive terms from 1904 to 1907. His son Arunachala Mudaliar was a popular politician of the Justice Party.
