= Exnora International =

Indian non-governmental organization

Coordinates: 13°2′2.98″N 80°13′48.22″E

Exnora Innovators International
- Formation: 30 September 1988; 38 years ago
- Type: NGO
- Purpose: Environmental causes
- Headquarters: Chennai, India
- Region served: India
- Members: Volunteer
- Founder: M. B. Nirmal
- Website: www.exnora.org

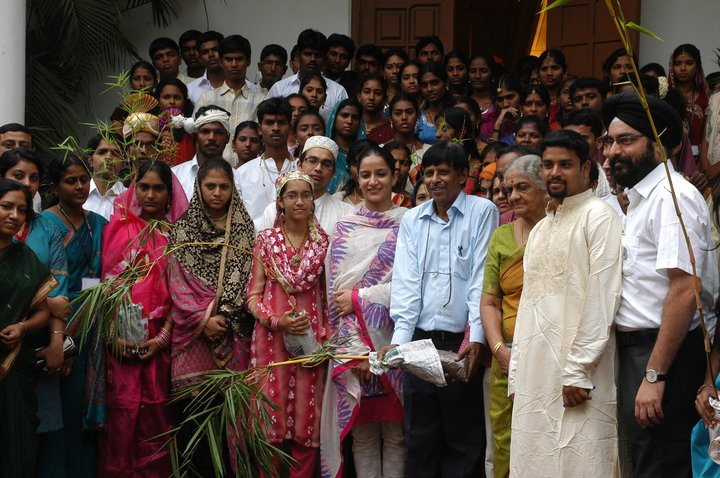
Youth Exnora International (YEI) group photo taken during YEI launch

Exnora International is a non-governmental environmental service organization started in 1989 in Chennai, Tamil Nadu, India, by M. B. Nirmal, a social activist. It focuses on preserving nature and preventing environmental degradation.

The name Exnora is derived from excellent, novel and radical ideas in solving environmental problems by involving those who caused the problem.

== History ==
Prior to the formation of Exnora, the Pammal town near Chennai was under served by the local corporation in terms of MSW collection. M.B. Nirmal and a group of local residents created awareness in the neighborhood regarding the important of appropriate waste management. They set up a model where they collected monthly user fees from the households and employed waste pickers to collect and clear the MSW.

The Pammal Municipal Corporation (PMC) encouraged Exnora as their fee-based model helped address MSW management in under served areas. At this time they took up the name Exnora Green Pammal. And Exnora grew to collect and manage 16.5 tonnes per day (TPD) of waste generated in Pammal. The PMC collects the balance 18.5 TPD of the total 35 TPD MSW generated by Pammal.

PepsiCo also noticed Exnora and partnered with it as part of its corporate social responsibility program on solid waste management. The Zero Waste Management (ZWM) project started by educating households on the importance and benefits of waste segregation. It facilitated the recycling of all recyclable MSW and set up vermicomposting for the organic waste through a Zero Solid Waste Center. This project achieved 97% household MSW recycling and earned the Exnora-PepsiCo partnership a Golden Peacock Award for Innovation in 2006 and a UNICEF Model Project citation in 2008.

UNICEF also published a best practices booklet of Exnora's MSW management model and success in five locations in Tamil Nadu. The aim of the booklet was to have other municipal corporations and urban local bodies replicate Exnora's activities in their cities.

Exnora International Tiruchi and Inner Wheel District 321 has cleaned up the Kambarasampettai nathing ghat, taking the concurrence of the Public Works Department.

As of 5 December 2021, members of Exnora has suggested a memorandum to the State Planning Commission which seeks to build infrastructures of underground storage points, and also to form a separate agency to implement rainwater harvesting in public spaces and monitor its impact.

== Activities ==
The organization provides street cleaning services through about 17,000 street chapters, 40% of Chennai city and 75% of the suburbs, and some other parts of Tamil Nadu. The street cleaning service includes a collection of garbage at homes, sorting at pickup, composting organic waste, and generating income for the "street beautifiers" through the sale of recyclables. The chapters also work with the local corporations and municipalities to address civic problems including sewage leaks, water supply problems, and repairs to street lamps.

The organization's Environmental Training Institute conducts training programs for school teachers on environmental issues such as biodiversity, climate change, and solid, liquid and zero waste management. The teachers are taught how to turn a home into a green building and set up vertical gardens.

A. Solid waste management (SoWaM) at various levels

- At Source (So-SoWaM- Source Solid Waste Management),
- At street, colony, area or settlement (De-SoWaM- De-Centralized Solid Waste Management)
- At Village / Town (Ce-SoWaM- Centralized Solid Waste Management)

B. Liquid Waste Management (LiWaM) at various levels

- At Source (So-LiWaM- Source Liquid waste Management)
- At street, colony, area or settlement (De-LiWaM - Decentralized Liquid Waste Management)
- At Village & Town (Ce-LiWaM- Centralized Liquid Waste Management)

Other Innovations for the Society & Environment - Sky Farming, Vertical Farming, Vertical Composting, Perennial Landfill, Psych Cycling, Cycling Cling, NONE Cycling. Synergy Composting, Thennai Chennai (on growing Coconut trees), "Teach Reach" (An easy to start inexpensive tuition center for slum children), "Helmet or Hell mate" (Novel campaign on the importance of wearing Helmet)

== Awards ==
1. November 2005 United States - Asia Environmental Partnership (USAEP) - Environmental Leadership Award Presented by US consul General.
2. June 1996 UNCHS Habitat - United Nations Center for Human Settlements.Best Practices of the World recognition for ExNoRa International in the Habitat Conference in Turkey.
3. 2002 – 2003 Tamil Nadu Government - Best Environmental Service Organisation. Presented by Honourable Minister for Environment
