= Meenakshi Chitharanjan =

Indian classical dancer, teacher and choreographer

- Born: Chennai, Tamil Nadu, India
- Education: Ethiraj College for Women
- Occupation: Classical dancer
- Known for: Bharatnatyam
- Spouse: Arun Chitharanjan
- Parent(s): Sabanagayam; Savithri
- Awards: Padma Shri; Kalaimamani Award; Natya Kala Sarathi; Nritya Choodamani
- Website: Website

Meenakshi Chitharanjan is an Indian classical dancer, teacher and choreographer, is known as an exponent of the Pandanallur style of the classical dance form of Bharatanatyam. She is the founder of Kaladiksha, an institution promoting Bharatanatyam and striving to preserve the Pandanallur tradition. A disciple of the father-son duo of Chokkalingam Pillai and Subbaraya Pillai, she is a recipient of several honours including Kalaimamani Award of the Government of Tamil Nadu and the Natya Kala Sarathi of Sri Parthasarathy Swami Sabha. The Government of India awarded her the fourth highest civilian honour of the Padma Shri, in 2008, for her contributions to classical dance.

== Biography ==
Meenakshi Chitharanjan was born in Chennai, in the south Indian state of Tamil Nadu to P. Sabanayagam, a government official, as the youngest and only girl child among his five children. Her mother, Savithri, sent the girl to Pandanallur Chockalingam Pillai, a renowned Bharatanatyam guru, when the child was four, and after training under the Pillai and his son, Subbaraya Pillai, she staged her arangetram (debut) in 1966 at the age of nine. Soon, she moved to Delhi when her father was transferred to the Indian capital, but continued her dance studies under Subbaraya Pillai by visiting Chennai during holidays. She did her college studies at Ethiraj College for Women and married Arun Chitharanjan, an orthodontist and the grandson of M. Bhaktavatsalam, the then chief minister of Tamil Nadu, after which her dance career halted for a while.

She returned to dancing after a chance meeting with Srinivasa Pillai, a percussionist who had played mridangam as an accompaniment to her in her younger days. She also trained abhinaya under Kalanidhi Narayanan, a Padma Bhushan awardee, and has been performing on stage since then. Srinivasa Pillai, S. Pandian and Padma Subrahmanyam have also trained her at various points of time. In 1991, she started Kaladiksha, a dance school for teaching Bharatanatyam which has since grown to hold around 100 students at a time and is known to be striving to preserve the Pandanallur bani. She has tutored many aspiring dancers and Aishwarya R. Dhanush, the wife of Dhanush, the eldest daughter of Rajnikanth and a Kalaimamani awardee, is one of her disciples. She received the title Natya Choodamani of Sri Krishna Gana Sabha and, Kalaimamani Award of the Government of Tamil Nadu in 1975. The Government of India awarded her the fourth highest civilian honour of the Padma Shri in 2008 and Sri Parthasarathy Swami Sabha honoured her with the title of Natya Kala Sarathi in 2014. She is also a recipient of Awards of Excellence from Rotary Club, Chenna and Probus Club, Chennai, and Best Dancer Award (2004) from Madras Music Academy. She holds the highest artist grade at the Doordarshan.

== See also ==
- Rukmini Devi Arundale
- Pandanallur style
