= Mohan Kameswaran =

Indian otorhinolaryngologist and medical academic

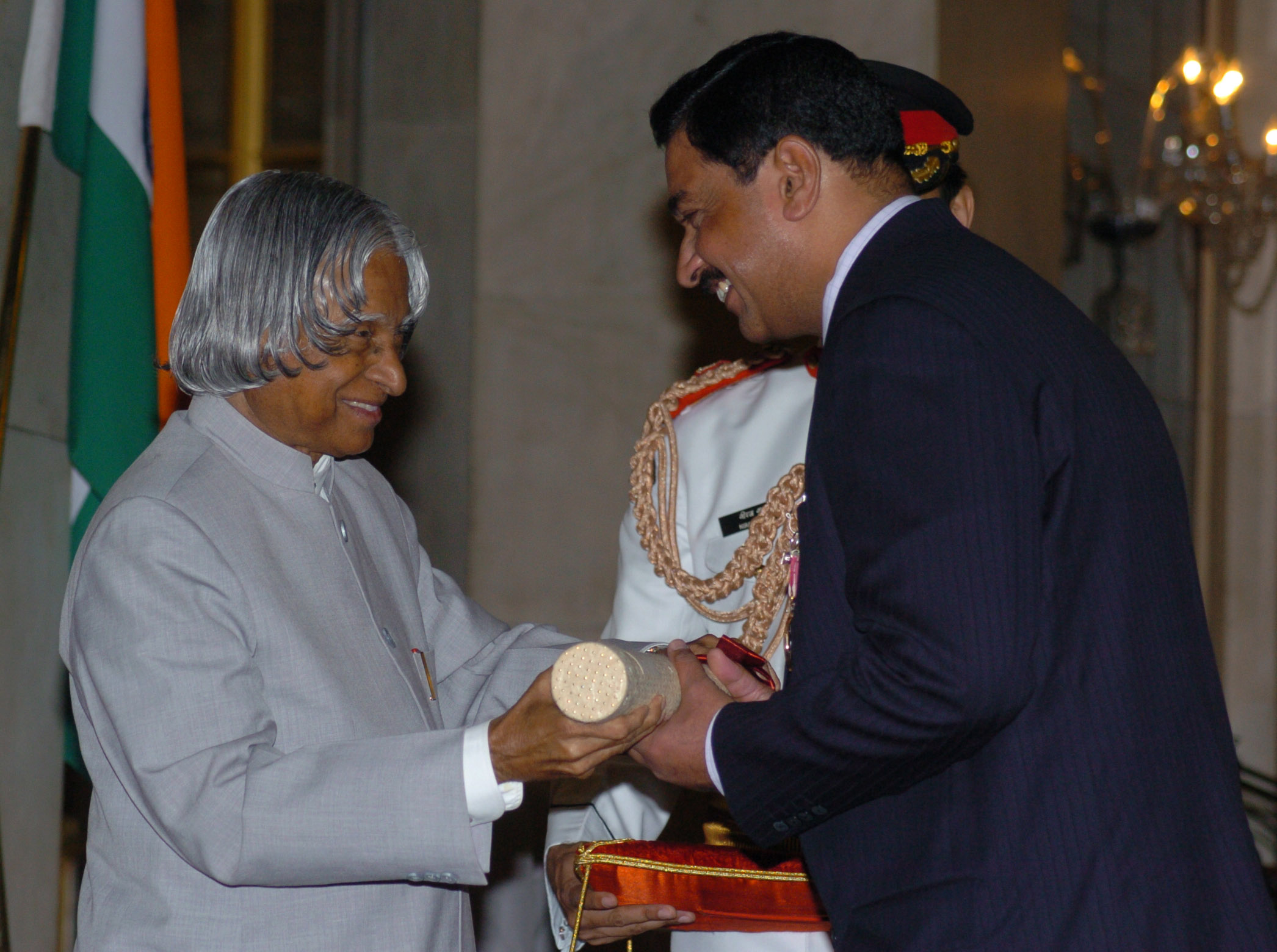
- The President, Dr. A.P.J. Abdul Kalam presenting Padma Shri to Prof. Mohan Kameswaran, in 2006.
- Born: Tamil Nadu, India
- Occupation: Otorhinolaryngologist
- Known for: MADRAS ENT RESEARCH FOUNDATION (P) LTD
- Spouse: Indira Kameshwaran
- Awards: Padma Shri; Indo-Australian Award for Meritorious Service; GoK Award for Excellence; Rotary For The Sake of Honour Award; Shri Shyam Lal Saxena Memorial Award; Tamil Nadu Scientist Award
- Website: Official website of MADRAS ENT RESEARCH FOUNDATION (P) LTD

Mohan Kameswaran is an Indian otorhinolaryngologist, medical academic and the founder of MERF Institute of Speech and Hearing, a Chennai-based institution providing advanced training in audiology and speech-language pathology. He is one of the pioneers of cochlear implant surgery in India and a visiting professor at Rajah Muthiah Medical College of the Annamalai University and Sri Ramachandra Medical College and Research Institute, Chennai. He has many firsts to his credit such as the performance of the first auditory brain stem implantation surgery in South and South East Asia, the first pediatric brain stem implantation surgery in Asia, the first totally implantable hearing device surgery in Asia Pacific region, and the first to introduce KTP/532 laser-assisted ENT surgery in India. The Government of India awarded him the fourth highest civilian honour of the Padma Shri, in 2006, for his contributions to Indian medicine.

== Biography ==
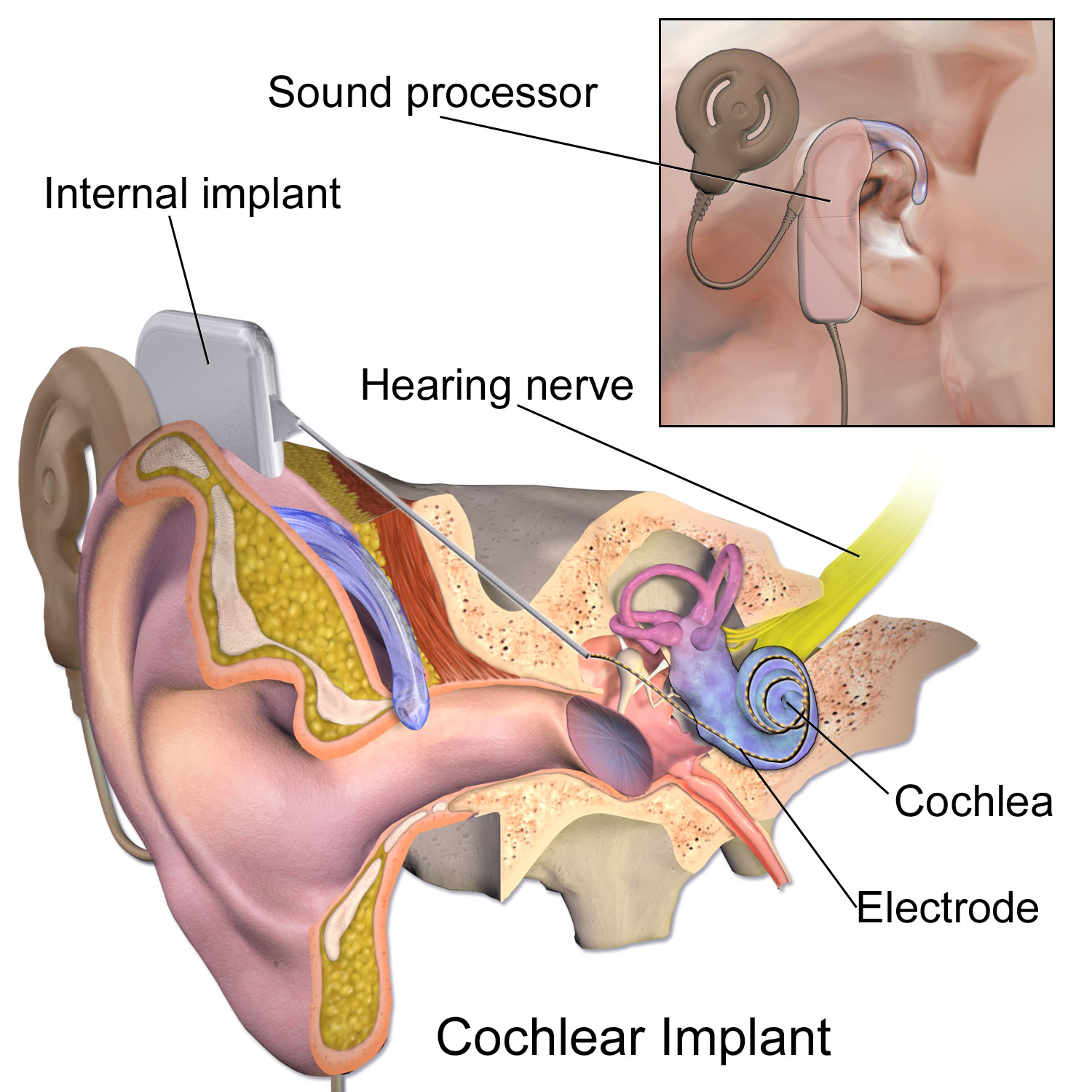
Cochlear Implant (illustrated)

Kameswaran was born in the south Indian state of Tamil Nadu and graduated in medicine from Madras Medical College in 1976. He continued his studies at the Institute of Otorhinolaryngology, Chennai to secure a post graduate specialization (MS) in otorhinolaryngology in 1981, after which he obtained the Fellowship of the Royal College of Surgeons of Edinburgh (FRCS). Later, he worked at the King Saud University, Saudi Arabia as the ENT Professor for a while. In 1996, he established Madras ENT Research Foundation (MERF) and, ten years later, the MERF Institute of Speech and Hearing (MERF-ISH) in 2006 at Mandavelli, a suburban town of Chennai. The institution, has in-patient facility for ENT related treatment and conducts courses such as Bachelor of Audiology And Speech Language Pathology (BASLP), Master of Audiology And Speech Language Pathology (MASLP), and Post Graduate diploma courses, in addition to offering research facilities leading to PhD, in affiliation with Tamil Nadu Dr. M.G.R. Medical University. He is associated with the Rajah Muthiah Medical College as a visiting professor and the Tamil Nadu Dr. M.G.R. Medical University as an adjunct professor.

In 2005, Kameswaran performed the first auditory brainstem implant surgery in South Asia and five years later, he performed the surgery on a child, becoming the first in Asia to perform the pediatric auditory brainstem implant. He is also credited with the first Totally Implantable Hearing Device surgery and MERF is the first hospital in India to use KTP Laser in an ENT surgery which they achieved in 1999. In 2013, he launched Listen App, a mobile-based application developed in association with a Belgian software firm, which works as a hearing aid as well as a music player. He is one of the founders of the Cochlear Implant Group of India and served as its president when the society was formed in November 2003. He has written a text book on the subject, Tropical Diseases in ENT and has mentored many ENT surgeons in their researches. He has also published over 40 articles in peer reviewed national and international journals and has organised several medical seminars and conferences, where he has delivered key note addresses.

Kameswaran is married to Indira, who is also associated with MERF in its management.

== Awards and honours ==
The year 2006 brought several honours to Kameswaran, starting with the fourth highest civilian award of the Padma Shri, in January, from the Government of India. This was followed by Indo-Australian Award from the Indo-Australian Association and For the Sake of Honour from the Chennai chapter of the Rotary International. Honouring his introduction of Cochlear Implant Program in Sri Lanka, the President of the country presented him with the Award for Excellence of Service and he also received the Award for Service from Arthur C. Clarke. The Government of Kerala awarded him the Award for Excellence the same year and National Academy of Medical Sciences (NAMS) chose his writings for the Shri Shyam Lal Saxena Memorial Award for the best published medical work. He is also an elected fellow of the National Academy of Medical Sciences,

In 2007, he was elected as a member of the governing body of the Cochlear Implant Board for the Asia-Pacific region, making him the first Indian to receive the honour. The Government of Tamil Nadu selected him for the Tamil Nadu Scientist Award in 2008 and the same year, Tamil Nadu Dr. M.G.R. Medical University conferred the degree of Doctor of Science (Honoris Causa) on him.

== Selected articles ==
- Mohan Kameswaran; M. C. Vasudevan; R. S. Anand Kumar; Jawahar Nagasundaram; Kiran Natarajan & S. Raghunandhan (January 2005). "Auditory brainstem implantation: The first Indian experience". Indian Journal of Otolaryngology and Head and Neck Surgery. 57 (1): 58–63. doi:10.1007/BF02907633. PMC 3451539. PMID 23120129.
- Sunil Narayan Dutt; Mohan Kameswaran (November 2005). "The aetiology and management of atrophic rhinitis". The Journal of Laryngology & Otology. 119 (11): 843–852. doi:10.1258/002221505774783377. PMID 16354334.
- Mohan Kameswaran; R. S. Anand Kumar; Sathiya Murali; S. Raghunandan; Jeeth Jacob (October 2005). "KTP-532 Laser In the Management of Rhinosporidiosis" (PDF). Indian Journal of Otolaryngology and Head and Neck Surgery. 57 (4).
