= Pachaiyappa's College =

College in Chennai, India

- Latin: Pcayappas collegium
- Former name: Pachaiyappa's Central Institution
- Motto: Mens Agitat Molem (Latin)
- Motto in English: "Mind Moves Matter"
- Type: Government Aided
- Established: 1 January 1842; 184 years ago
- Affiliations: University of Madras
- President: Thiru S.Raju Administrator(Interim)
- Principal: Dr.R.Srijayanthi
- Location: Chennai, Tamil Nadu, India; 13°4′23.25″N 80°13′59.05″E
- Campus: Urban
- Colors: Green
- Mascot: Pachaiyappa Mudaliar
- Website: www.pachaiyappascollege.edu.in

Pachaiyappa's College is one of the oldest educational institutions in Chennai, in the South Indian state of Tamil Nadu. In addition, it is the first sole Indian college in Madras Presidency.

== History ==
Pachaiyappa's College, Chennai is the result of an act of philanthropy of its progenitor, Pachaiyappa Mudaliar, who was a financier and merchant by the age of 22. The college had its genesis in the will of Pachaiyappa Mudaliar.

The college was established as Pachaiyappa's Central Institution at Popham's Broadway on 1 January 1842, financially aided by Pachaiyappa Mudaliar's will. It was the first educational institution in South India which was not funded by the British. The architecture of the institution is notable, consisting of Indo-Saracenic and the architecture of South India. It gained college status in 1889, and until 1947 it only admitted Hindu students. Between 1920 and 1921, Charles Leslie Wrenn, a scholar who would later replace J.R.R. Tolkien as Rawlinson and Bosworth Professor of Anglo-Saxon, was the Principal and Professor of English.

In addition, Pachaiyappa's College (1842) is the 4th oldest institution in the country, next to Madras Christian College (1837) and Presidency College (1840) as 3 from the top 5 oldest institutions in the country are from South India.

== Administration ==
The Pachaiyappa's College Administration is governed by a board of trustees called Pachaiyappa's trust board. The Board oversees the long-term development and plans of the Institution and manages fundraising efforts. The board also control's various other Institutions in the state.

=== List of colleges under Pachaiyappa's Trust Board ===
- Chellammal Women's College
- C. Kandaswami Naidu College for Men
- Kandasamy Naidu College for Women (KNC), Cuddalore.
- Pachaiyappa's College for Men, Kanchipuram.
- Pachaiyappa's College for Women, Kanchipuram.

== Awards ==
As a remembrance and a devotion, the college awards a prize to the student who stands first among all mathematics students in the name of S.P. Singaravelu Mudaliar, who was a teacher of renowned mathematician Srinivasa Ramanujan.

== Academic departments ==
=== Undergraduate (U.G.) ===
SHIFT I: Aided

=== Arts ===
- B.A. (History)
- B.A. (Tamil Lit.)
- B.A. (English Lit.)
- B.A. (Economics)
- B.A. (Philosophy)

=== Commerce ===
- B.Com. (General)
- B.Com. (Corporate)

=== Science ===
- BSc (Mathematics)
- BSc (Physics)
- BSc (Chemistry)
- BSc (Plant Biology & Plant Biotechnology)
- BSc (Advanced Zoology & Biotechnology)

SHIFT II: Self-financed

=== Commerce ===
- B.Com. (General)
- BSc (Computer Science)

Co-education

- B.Com. (Bank Management)
- B.Com. (Accounting & Finance)
- B.B.A.
- B.C.A

=== Postgraduate (P.G.) ===
SHIFT I : Aided

=== Arts ===
- M.A. (Tamil Lit.)
- M.A. (Economics)
- M.A. (English Lit.)
- M.A. (History)
- M.A. (Philosophy)

=== Commerce ===
- M.Com. (General)

=== Science and philosophy ===
- MSc Mathematics
- MSc Chemistry
- MSc Physics
- MSc Botany
- MSc Zoology
- M.Phil. English
- M.Phil. Mathematics
- M.Phil. Philosophy
- M.Phil. History
- M.Phil. Economics
- M.Phil. Chemistry
- M.Phil. Botany
- M.Phil. Zoology
- M.Phil. Commerce
- M.Phil. Tamil

PhD

- PhD Tamil
- PhD English
- PhD Maths
- PhD Philosophy
- PhD History
- PhD Economics
- PhD Physics
- PhD Chemistry
- PhD Botany
- PhD Zoology
- PhD Commerce

== Notable alumni ==
A listing of notable alumni is published by the college. Some of those named are as follows.

=== Physicist ===
- Anna Mani

=== Mathematicians ===
- Srinivasa Ramanujan (did not graduate), mathematician

=== Politicians ===
- C. N. Annadurai, Chief Minister of Tamil Nadu, 1967–69
- Kasu Brahmananda Reddy, Chief Minister of Andhra Pradesh, 1964–71
- Murasoli Maran, politician
- Prof. K. Anbazhagan, politician
- Navalar Nedunchezhiyan, politician, Interim Chief minister, Minister for 25 years
- E. V. K. Sampath, politician and one of the founders of Dravida Munnetra Kazhagam
- C. Vijayaraghavachariar, former President of the Indian National Congress
- K. C. Reddy, first Chief Minister of old state of Mysore
- Boddepalli Rajagopala Rao, parliamentarian
- E. Pugazhendi, Cuddalore Legislator thrice
- Durai Murugan, Kadpadi, Vellore Legislator and Senior Most Cabinet Minister of TN State in the last 4 decades
- P. R. Natarajan, Member of Parliament (Lokha Sabha)

=== Bureaucrat ===
- C. K. Gandhirajan, IPS Officer

=== Literary figures ===
- Paravastu Chinnayasuri, Telugu poet and professor of Telugu language
- Pammal Sambandha Mudaliar, Tamil playwright
- Mamidipudi Venkatarangayya, history writer
- Vairamuthu, poet
- K. D. Thirunavukkarasu, Tamil scholar and Sahitya Akademi Award winner
- Tapi Dharma Rao, Telugu journalist and Sahitya Akademi Award winner

=== Filmmakers ===
- R. S. Manohar, drama and Tamil cinema actor
- A. M. Rajah, singer and music director
- D. Imman, music director
- Na. Muthukumar, Tamil Lyricist

=== Other ===
- N. Madhava Rao - Former Diwan of Kingdom of Mysore, Member of Drafting Committee, Mysore Civil Service (ICS Officer)
- Robin Singh, former Indian cricketer
- Bharath Reddy, former Indian cricketer
- M. Ilanchezhian, -Tamil Scholar and Writer, Professor, Rationalist
- M. B. Nirmal, environmentalist and founder of Exnora International

== Postage stamp ==
On 31 March 2010, the Indian Postal Service released a commemorative postage stamp on Pachaiyappa Mudaliar. The multi color stamp was designed by India Security Press, Nasik.
