= Ram Gopal (dancer) =

Indian dancer and choreographer (1912–2003)

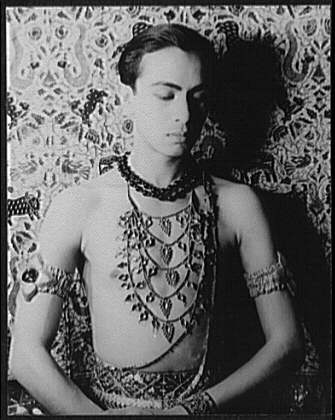
- Ram Gopal, photograph by Carl Van Vechten, 1938.
- Born: Bissano Ram Gopal; November 20, 1912; Bangalore, British India
- Died: October 12, 2003; Croydon, South London, United Kingdom
- Occupations: Dancer, choreographer
- Honours: OBE

Bissano Ram Gopal OBE (20 November 1912 – 12 October 2003) was an Indian dancer and choreographer who performed mostly as a soloist and toured extensively throughout his lengthy career. A modernist, he blended classical Indian dance styles, folk dance and balletic choreography, and along with Uday Shankar was among the first to showcase Indian classical dance in the West starting in the 1930s, Polish critic Tadeusz Zelenski called him "the Nijinsky of India".

As a choreographer, he is most known for his productions, Legend of the Taj Mahal, and Dances of India, and solo items Dance of the Setting Sun and Garuda. He is also noted for "Radha-Krishna", his collaboration with British ballerina Dame Alicia Markova, in 1960.

== Early life and training ==
Gopal was born in Bangalore, India. He was named Bissano, being born on 20 November (Bees = 20 in Hindi). He had a Burmese mother and a Rajput father who was a barrister. They lived in a mansion called Torquay Castle. His grandmother was a well known dancer. Drawn to dance early on in his life, he learned Kathakali from Guru Kunju Kurup and Chandu Panickar. Once he danced at the annual garden party of the Maharaja of Mysore without his father's permission, but the Maharaja persuaded his father to allow him to receive further dance training.

While in this early forties, he discovered Guru Meenakshi Sundaram Pillai of Pandanallur style under whom he started learning Bharatanatyam, followed by Muthukumaran Pillai; he also learned Kathak from Sohanlal and Bowri Prasad and even Manipuri dance, all of which he assimilated into his choreographies in the coming decades.

== Career ==
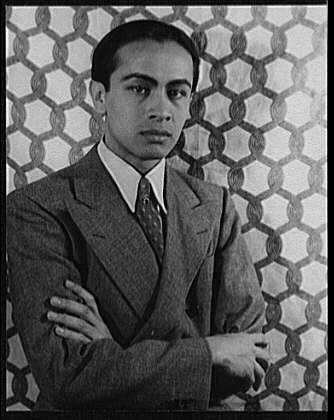
Ram Gopal in 1938

He was invited to the United States by La Meri, an American dancer who specialised in non-Western forms of dance to tour with her through Asia in the 1930s. He made his solo debut in New York City on 1 May 1938, at the 46th Street Theatre. His impresario was Polish writer Aleksander Janta-Połczyński, who organized Gopal's tournée across Poland in June 1938. In 1939, Gopal was invited to Paris, where he went with Kathak dancer, Sohanlal. and in the same year he made his London debut at the Aldwych Theatre to immediate fame and went on to meet not just Queen Mary, but also made friends with leading figures of the ballet. He returned to India with Ensa during the World War II, ending the professional relationship with Janta-Połczyński. After the war, he returned and noted dancer, Nijinsky came to "inspect him" in 1948.

He toured extensively as a soloist and with his company both before and after World War II, and soon they were known for their costumes, staging and lighting. He appeared at the New York Golden Anniversary International Dance Festival at NYC's City Center in 1948 where he represented India, the Jacob's Pillow Dance Festival in the Berkshires in 1954 and Edinburgh Festival in 1956. He collaborated with ballerina Dame Alicia Markova to create a duet "Radha-Krishna" in 1960, based on Hindu mythology, in which she danced as Radha, while he danced as Krishna. Today their collaboration is commemorated at the National Portrait Gallery, London where her bronze bust stands next to his full-length portrait by Feliks Topolski. In the later years, he also danced with Mrinalini Sarabhai in Bangalore, and toured with Kumudini Lakhia. Another successful dance partnership was with the young and talented Tara Chaudhri whom Ram was very fond of. Dance critic, Cyril Beaumont editor of "Dance Journal", wrote about his dancing, "what impresses one most about Ram Gopal's dancing is the manner in which he is able to assimilate the characteristics of the four schools of technique so completely different in style, costume and mood."

He also danced in the Mumbai school run by the Austrian expressionist dancer Hilde Holger, with whom he remained friends and collaborated with her in their experimental dance style pieces.

In Kay Ambrose's book published in 1950, "Classical Dances and Costumes of India," the book is introduced by Ram Gopal, with foreword by Arnold Haskell containing 53 illustrations from photographs and many drawings by the author. In this introduction is included a letter Ram Gopal wrote to Kay Ambrose from Bangalore, his birthplace in February 1942. The book has many photos and illustrations of Ram Gopal performing these classical dances.

He published Indian Dancing in 1951, and his autobiography Rhythms in the Heavens in 1957; he also opened two dance schools for a short while, first in Bangalore before moving to England and later "Academy of Indian Dance and Music" in London in 1962. In his later years he lived in London, Venice and the South of France.

The French filmmaker Claude Lamorisse made two films about him: "Aum Shiva" and "Ram". Gopal featured in the Indian-born British documentary filmmaker Sarah Erulkar's short Lord Siva Danced (1947).

He received an Order of the British Empire (OBE) for services to dance in 1999, and the Sangeet Natak Akademi Fellowship, by the Sangeet Natak Akademi, India's National Academy for Music, Dance and Drama in 1990.

== Personal life ==
During the 1960s, while living in Chelsea, London he was briefly married to Edith Alexander, though the marriage ended only a few years later, with her death. The couple had no children.

He died in Norbury Care Home in Croydon, South London, UK, where he spent the last three years of his life after unsuccessfully attempting to settle down in his native Bangalore. His stay was sponsored by the Lamorrise family, Croydon Council and the Royal Ballet Benevolent Fund. After cremation his ashes were scattered on the grounds of Lamorrise family chateau in South of France where, he had spent a decade as a house guest of Mrs Claude Lamorrise. Pam Cullen, former cultural advisor to the Indian High Commission and Gopal's close friend, became the executor of the "Ram Gopal Estate" and donated some of his costume pieces, especially ornate headgears to V&A Museum, London.

== Works ==
- Indian dancing, by Ram Gopal, Serozh Dadachanji. Phoenix House, 1951.
- Ram Gopal: rhythm in the heavens : an autobiography, by Ram Gopal. Secker and Warburg, 1957
