= M. B. Nirmal =

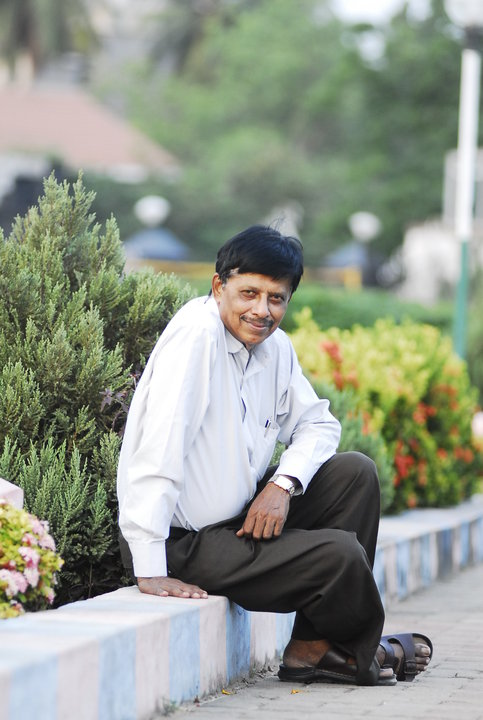
- Born: 10 October 1943 (age 83); Kunrathur, Tamil Nadu
- Education: Pachaiyappa's College, Chetpet, Madras Law College
- Occupation: Social activist
- Known for: Environmental management

M. B. Nirmal is the founder and chairman of Exnora International which is a civil movement in Chennai, Tamil Nadu, India, which deals with environmental issues. In addition to his involvement in Exnora, Nirmal is also involved in consumer advocacy, afforestation programmes, and rehabilitation of convicts among others.

== Education ==
Nirmal did his schooling in Government Higher secondary school Kundrathur and obtained his graduation from Pachiappa’s college Chetpet, Chennai. He obtained his degree in Law from Madras Law College.

== One Hut - One Light ==
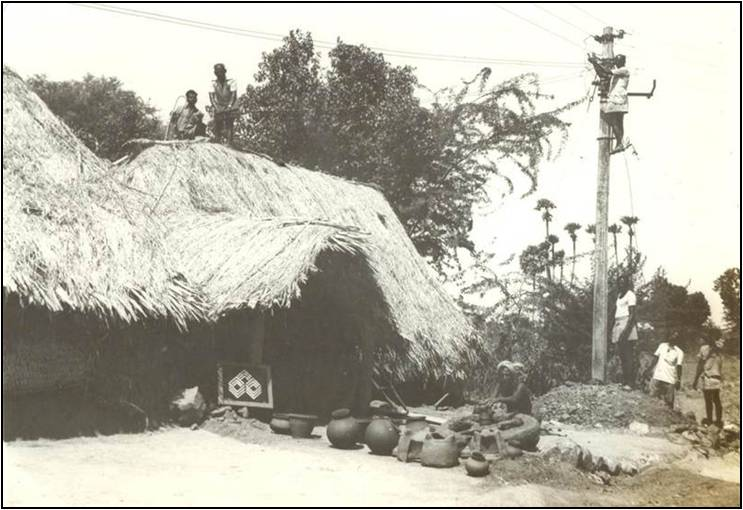
"One Hut - One Light" scheme in Sogandi village in 1978.

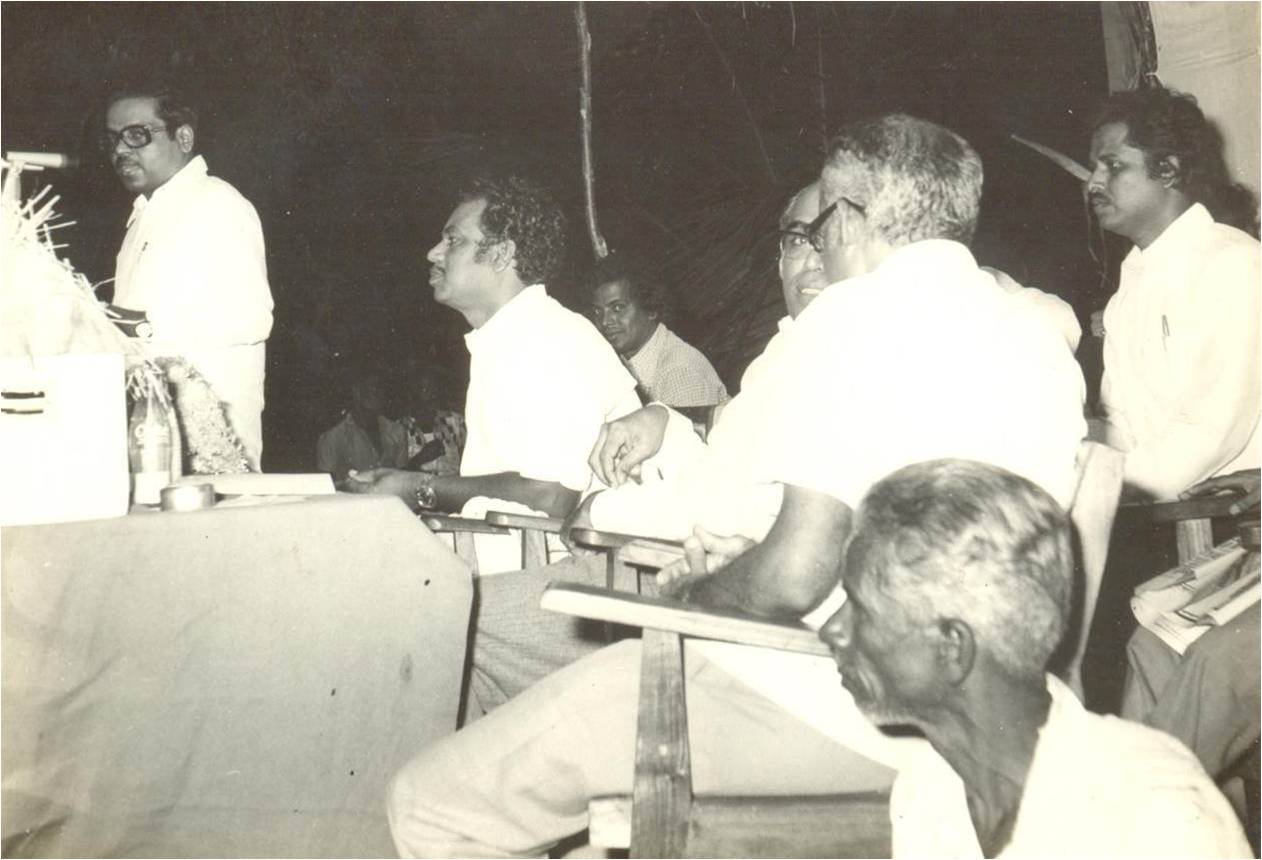
"One Hut One Light" scheme was introduced for the first time in India in the Sogandi village in 1978 by Indian Overseas Bank in Chengalpet for which M. B. Nirmal was the manager. Hon’le Minister Panruti S. Ramachandran is seen inaugurating, with Nirmal seated in the back.

== Author ==
He is author of twelve books in Tamil and six books in English written for individual and societal development. He has been writing in leading Magazines and periodicals regularly.
