= Gatti Mudalis =

The Gatti Mudalis were rulers based in Taramangalam, India, in the 17th century.
