= Chunampet =

Village in India

Coordinates: 12°16′N 79°55′E

Chunampet is a village in the Cheyyur taluk of Chengalpattu district in Tamil Nadu State of India. It is located 99 kilometres from Chennai and 22 kilometres from Madurantakam on the Madurantakam-Marakkanam road. It was the seat of the zamindar of Chunampet during the colonial era. It is located at the southern edge of the Buckingham Canal.

Chunampet is famous for a 19th-century Hindu temple dedicated to Kiratamanjeswarar The temple was, till recently, in ruins, and was renovated by Arunachala Mudaliar, the erstwhile zamindar of Chunampet and his descendants. It is also has an old masjid which was built by the Nawab of Arcot, Doste Ali Khan in 1760 AD.

Chunampet is situated about 9 kilometres from the Bay of Bengal coast and is surrounded by salt pans extending for over seven miles.
