= Salem metropolitan area (India) =

Greater Salem
- Metropolitan area
- Salem Metropolitan Area
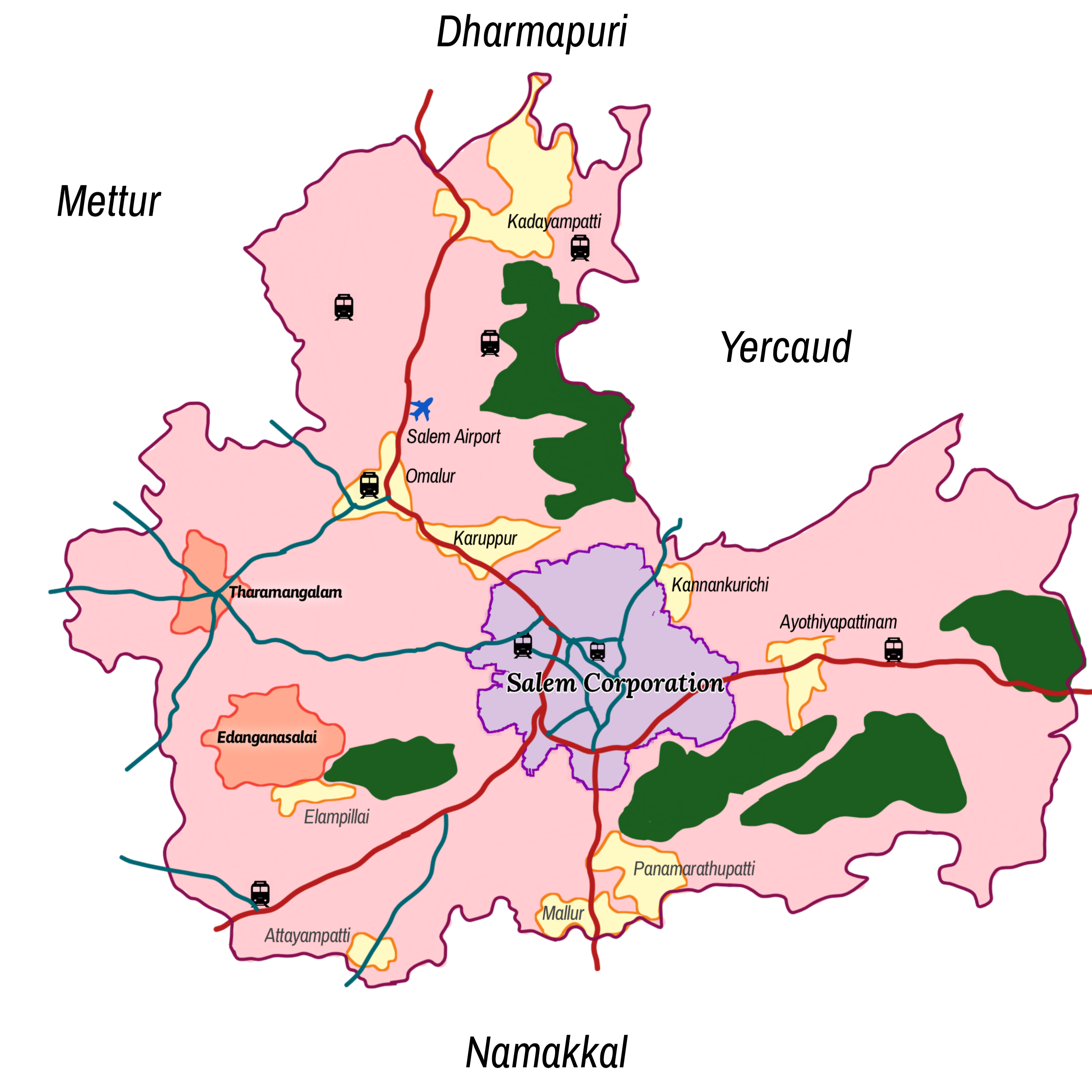
- Nicknames: Mango City, Steel City
- Country: India
- State: Tamil Nadu
- Planning Authority: Salem Urban Development Authority (SUDA)
- Parliament constituencies: Salem; Namakkal; Kallakurichi
- Assembly constituencies: Salem West; Salem North; Salem South; Omalur; Yercaud; Sangagiri; Veerapandi
- Jurisdiction: Municipal corporations - 1; Municipalities - 2; Town Panchayats - 9; Revenue Villages - 276
- Seat: Salem
- District: Salem District

Government
  - Type: Metropolitan Area
  - Body: Salem Urban Development Authority (SUDA)

Area
  - Metropolitan area: 1,265.197 km^{2} (488.495 sq mi)
  - Urban: 264 km^{2} (102 sq mi)
  - Metro: 1,141.197 km^{2} (440.619 sq mi)

Population (2011)
  - Density: 9,079/km^{2} (23,510/sq mi)
  - Metro: 2,463,367
- Demonym(s): Salemians, Salemites
- Time zone: UTC+5:30
- PIN: 636XXX
- STD code: +91-0427
- Vehicle registration: TN-30 (West), TN-90 (South), TN-54 (East), TN-30 W (Omalur), TN-52 (Sankagiri)
- Website: http://www.salemlpamasterplan.com

The Greater Salem or Salem Metropolitan Area, is the sixteenth most populous metropolitan area in India. It is the third most populous metropolitan area in Tamil Nadu, only after Chennai and Coimbatore as per 2011 census.The Salem Metropolitan Area consist of the city of Salem and its suburbs in Salem district.

== Economy ==
The economy of Salem is mostly influenced by Information Technology, Steel, Textile industry, Agriculture and others. Salem is most popularly known as the Steel City and Mango City of India. Gross Domestic Product (GDP) of Salem city is 12,134.10 (In Crore Rupees) and growth rate is 10.31% (YOY). It is the third largest economical district in Tamil Nadu. Salem has one special economic zone over 40 in Tamil Nadu. ELCOT has established an IT SEZ at Jagirammapalayam village in an extent of 53.33 acres of land at an investment of ₹ 40.53 crore.

Salem district also have local planning authority called Salem Local Planning Authority for development of Salem City Corporation area and Salem metropolitan area.

== Salem metro ==
Salem Metro is the proposed monorail system for the city of Salem, Tamil Nadu, part of a major expansion of public transport in the city. Salem city is one of the developed city in Tamil Nadu. As the monorail market is estimated to be ₹72,000 crore (US$10 billion) in India, the then Governor of Tamil Nadu S. S. Barnvarilal announced in Legislative assembly that the Government of Tamil Nadu has decided to do a feasibility study for introducing monorail system in Salem along with Coimbatore, Trichy and Madurai.

== Composition ==
The Salem metropolitan area is Metropolitan Area in Tamil Nadu state, consisting the city of Salem and its suburbs. It consist of Salem City Municipal Corporation and suburban areas spread over the Salem district.

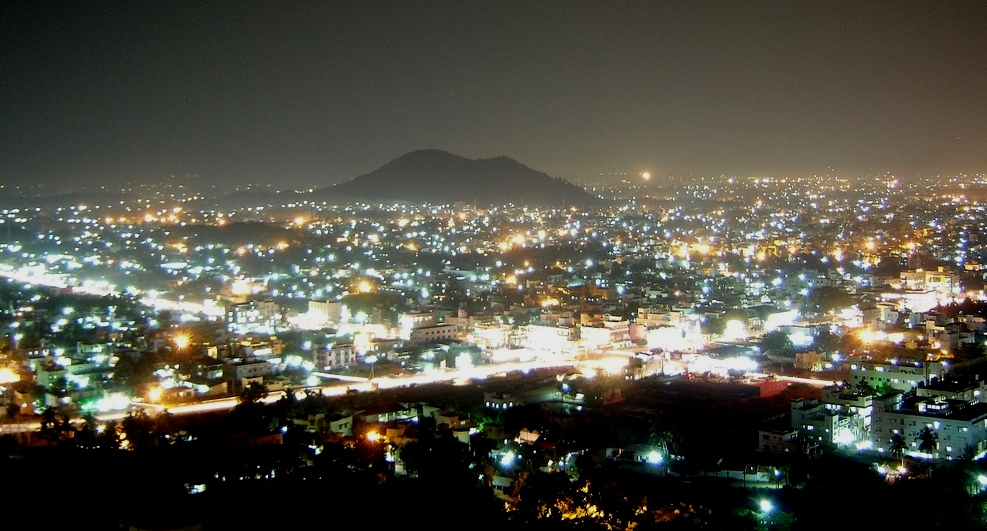
Salem urban area at night

New construction in areas under the Salem Urban Development Authority needs their approval to start work. And total area covered is 1,265.197 km^{2}, and population is 2,463,367.

== Municipal corporation ==
- Salem City Municipal Corporation

== Municipalities ==
- Tharamangalam
- Edanganasalai

== Town Panchayats ==
- Kannankurichi
- Mallur
- Elampillai
- Panaimarathupatti
- Ayothiapattinam
- Omalur
- Karuppur
- Kadayampatti
- Attayamapatti

== Districts ==
- Salem Metropolis
- Salem district Urban areas
- Areas covered in Salem Metropolitan Area

== Revenue Blocks ==
Salem metropolitan area includes 276 revenue villages from 9 blocks of the district.

- Salem
- Panaimarathupatti
- Ayothiyapattinam
- Veerapandi
- Omalur
- Tharamangalam
- Kadayamapatti
- Magudanchavadi (Mac Donal Choultry)
- Valapady (Part)

== Salem Urban Development Authority ==
The Salem Urban Development Authority (SUDA) is nodal planning agency for Salem City Municipal Corporation and it's Suburbs of Indian state of Tamil Nadu. Salem Urban Development Authority administers the Salem Metropolitan Area, spread over an area of 1265.197 km^{2}. And covers the area of Salem City Municipal Corporation, 2 Municipalities, 8 Town Panchayats and 7 Panchayat Unions. Total population of the area covered by Salem Urban Development Authority is 2,463,367.

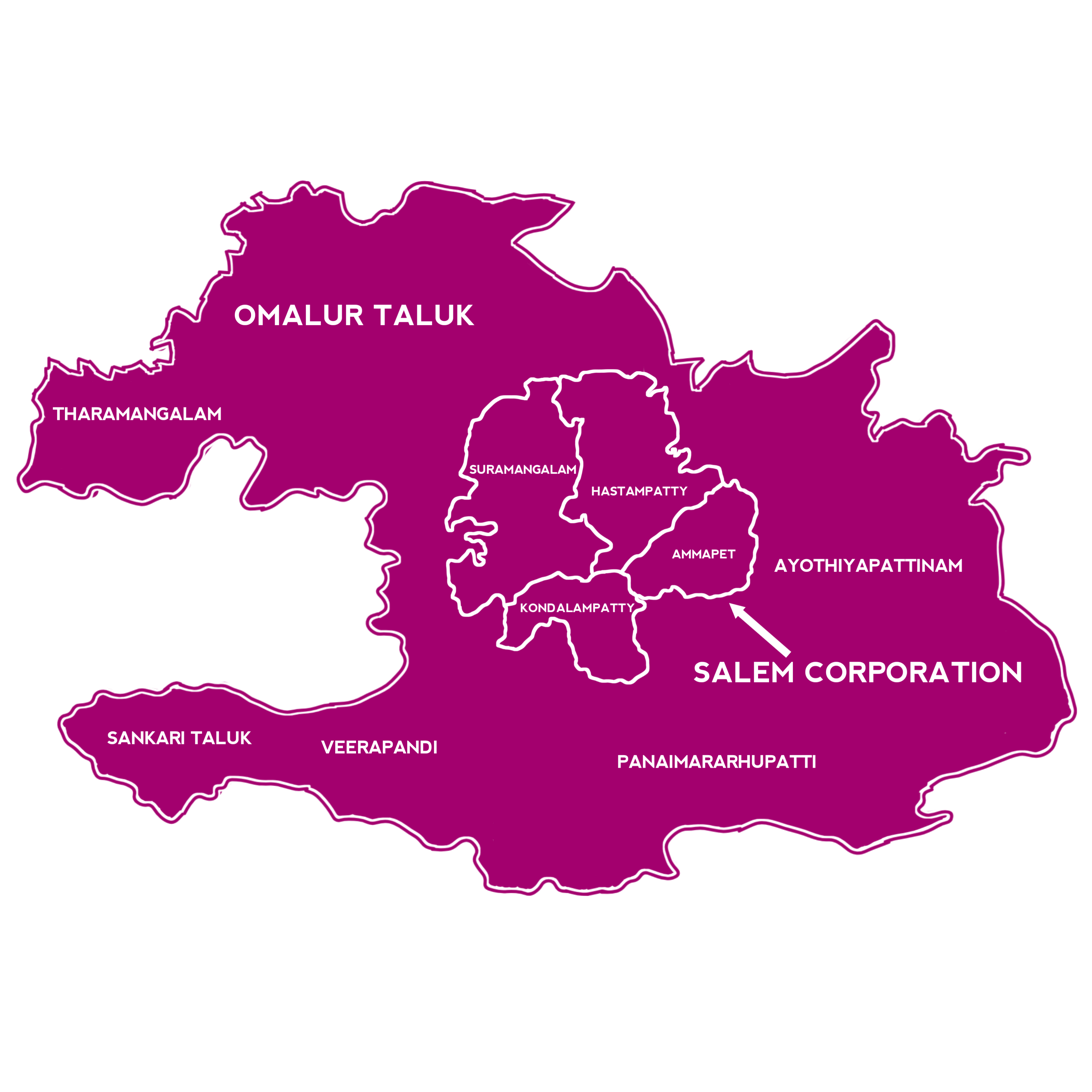
Old Salem Local Planning Area

== See also ==
- Chennai metropolitan area
- Coimbatore metropolitan area
- Madurai metropolitan area
- Tiruchirappalli metropolitan area
- List of million-plus urban agglomerations in India
- List of districts in Tamil Nadu by Human Development Index
- List of urban agglomerations in Tamil Nadu
- List of metropolitan areas in Tamil Nadu
- Economy of Salem, Tamil Nadu
