= Thirumanimutharu River (tributary of Kaveri) =

Thirumanimutharu river
- Native name: திருமணிமுத்தாறு (Tamil)

Location
- Country: Salem District, Namakkal district India

Physical characteristics
- Source
  - location: Manjavadi, Shevaroy Mountain at Yercaud
  - coordinates: 11°46′45″N 78°12′12″E
  - elevation: 1,515 meters (4,970 ft)
- Mouth
  - location: Nanjai Edayar at Namakkal district
  - coordinates: 11°05′58″N 78°02′04″E
  - elevation: 121 meters (397 ft)
- Length: 120 km (75 mi)

== Thirumanimutharu River ==
The Thirumanimutharu River originates from three reserved forests in the Eastern Ghats (Shevaroy Mountain) in Salem district, Tamil Nadu. It runs for 120 kilometers through Namakkal district before joining the Cauvery River near Paramathi Velur at Nanjai Edayar village in Namakkal district, Tamil Nadu.

=== Source and Course ===
The river originates from three reserved forests in the Eastern Ghats:

- Velampatti Reserved Forest to the east,
- Manjavadi Ghat Reserved Forest to the north, and
- Kapputhu Reserved Forest to the west.

Several streams flow southward from Velampatti Reserved Forest (11°45′30.6″N 78°19′51.8″E), converging into a single river known as the East Thirumanimutharu. This river passes through several villages, including Kuttathupatti, Palapatti, Jalakandapuram, Sarkar Nattamangalam, and Karumapuram, before entering Karipatti village. From Karipatti village, the Thirumanimutharu flows westward, passing through Ayothiyapattinam on its way to Salem town.

Three water streams originate from the Manjavadi Ghat Reserved Forest (11°46′57.7″N 78°19′03.6″E), merging into a single river called the West Thirumanimutharu. This river flows towards Salem town, passing through many villages such as Achankuttapatti, Kuppanur, and Paruthikadu. Before entering Salem town, the East and West Thirumanimutharu Rivers converge at Mannarpalayam village (11°41′00.6″N 78°11′40.5″E), forming a single river that continues through the Salem town area.

A water stream originates from the Kapputhu Reserved Forest (south side of Yercaud Hills) (11°44′07.2″N 78°12′46.6″E) and flows towards Salem town. Before entering Salem, it merges with the Thirumanimutharu River at Mannarpalayam (11°41′46.3″N 78°12′04.8″E). Here, part of the water from the Thirumanimutharu River is diverted to Mookaneri Lake in Kannankurichi using a check dam.

Another water stream originates from the west side of the Yercaud Hills in Kurumbapatty (11°44′26.8″N 78°10′17.9″E) and merges with the Thirumanimutharu River to the north of Nethimedu (11°38′58.7″N 78°08′04.8″E) in Salem town.

The Kannimar Stream originates from the northern side of the Jarugumalai Reserved Forest (11°37′34.4″N 78°12′21.0″E), flowing through the Skandasramam Murugan Temple and reaching Kumaragiri Lake. It then continues through the middle of Salem town, eventually merging with the Thirumanimutharu River within Salem town.

Two water streams originate from the southern side of the Kanjamalai Reserved Forest (11°36′36.9″N 78°03′45.6″E) and flow eastward, merging with the Thirumanimutharu River at Chinnasiragapadi.

The Ponniyar River originates to the north side of the Kanjamalai Reserved Forest (11°37′12.6″N 78°01′46.6″E) and flows through Elampillai, Magudanchavadi, and Mallasamudram, merging with the Thirumanimutharu River at Konnayar village.

Several water streams (called the Elur River) originate from the Namagiripettai village side of the Kolli Hills (11°27′04.8″N 78°19′04.4″E). These streams flow through Elur village in Namakkal district and merge with the Thirumanimutharu River to the north of Kudacheri village.

== River Linking ==
The Cauvery-Ponniyar-Thirumanimutharu River Linking Project is a proposed initiative in Tamil Nadu aimed at improving water resource management in the region. This project is part of broader efforts to connect various river systems to address water shortages, particularly in drought-prone areas.

== Thirumanimutharu River Pollution ==
Historically, the Thirumanimutharu River has been an important water source for agriculture and local communities. However, it has become heavily polluted due to industrial effluents, untreated sewage, and agricultural runoff. The river's degradation has sparked environmental concerns, leading to government intervention and public demand for rejuvenation.

=== Sources of Pollution ===
- Industrial Effluents: The banks of the Thirumanimutharu River host various industries, including sago processing units, textile dyeing, and bleaching factories. These industries discharge untreated or partially treated wastewater directly into the river, introducing harmful chemicals such as dyes, heavy metals, and other pollutants.
- Sago Units: The sago industry, prominent in the Salem region, is a major contributor to the pollution of the Thirumanimutharu River. The wastewater from sago processing contains a high load of organic matter, leading to increased Biochemical Oxygen Demand (BOD) levels, which deplete oxygen and harm aquatic life.
- Sewage Discharge: A significant portion of the river's pollution comes from untreated domestic sewage. For example, Salem Corporation's sewage is discharged directly into the river, further exacerbating pollution levels. The untreated sewage contains pathogens and organic pollutants, increasing the river's fecal coliform count and posing serious public health risks.

According to reports, BOD levels in various stretches of the river have reached critical levels, indicating severe pollution and contamination.

=== Environmental Impact ===
The high levels of industrial pollutants and sewage have severely affected aquatic ecosystems. Oxygen depletion, caused by organic waste and chemicals, has reduced biodiversity in the river.

=== Rejuvenation Efforts ===
In response to the severe pollution, several efforts have been made to clean up and rejuvenate the Thirumanimutharu River:

- Sewage Treatment Plants (STPs): The Tamil Nadu government, with the intervention of the National Green Tribunal (NGT), has initiated the construction of STPs along the river to treat domestic sewage before it enters the river. As of recent reports, multiple STPs with a combined capacity of 98 million liters per day (MLD) are in various stages of completion.
- Pollution Control Measures: The Tamil Nadu Pollution Control Board (TNPCB) has intensified its monitoring efforts and enforcement of pollution control measures. Several illegal industrial units have been shut down, and stringent regulations have been imposed on industries to ensure compliance with environmental norms. Regular inspections are carried out to detect unauthorized effluent discharge.

Despite these efforts, the implementation of rejuvenation projects, such as the construction of STPs, has faced delays due to issues like tender processes and bureaucratic hurdles, slowing down the river's recovery.

== See also ==
- List of rivers of Tamil Nadu
