= Pachaimalai Hills =

Mountain range in India

Pachamalai
- Hill Station
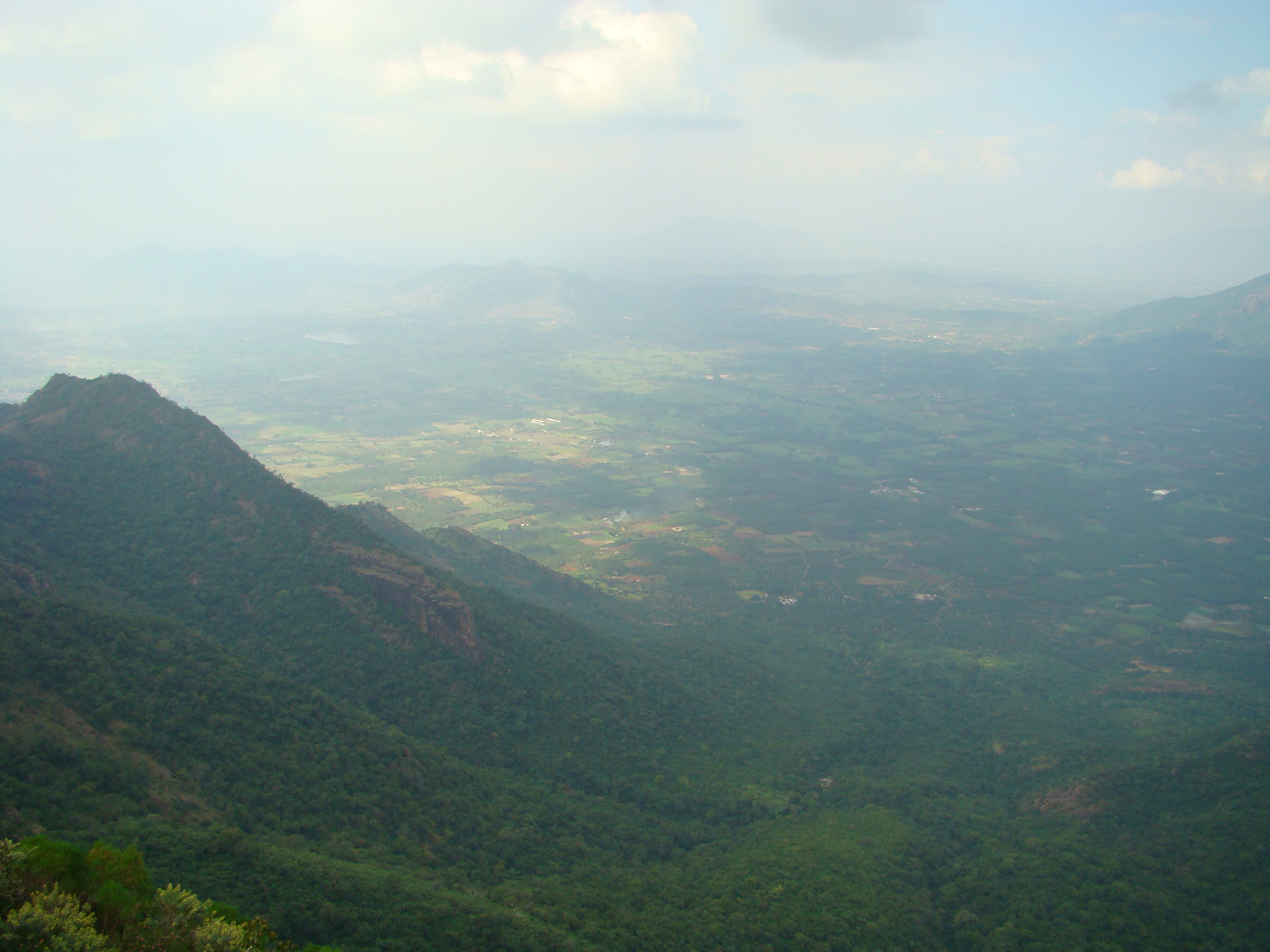

- Location within Tamil Nadu
- Coordinates: 11°20′48″N 78°35′50″E
- Country: India
- State: Tamil Nadu
- Region: Kongu nadu
- District: Salem
- Taluk: Gangavalli

Government
  - Type: Local government of Tamil Nadu

Area
  - Total: 383 km^{2} (148 sq mi)
- Elevation: 1,200 m (3,900 ft)

Population (2001)
  - Total: 31,500
  - Density: 82.2/km^{2} (213/sq mi)

Languages
  - Official: Tamil
- Time zone: UTC+5:30 (IST)
- Postal code: 636105
- Vehicle registration: TN 30
- Tamil and English spoken

Pachamalai, is a hill station and Gangavalli Taluk in Salem district, Tamil Nadu, India.

== Etymology ==
The name is derived from the combination of the Tamil words 'pachai' meaning green and 'malai' meaning hills. The name originated due to the greenery and vegetation that covers the hills.

== Geography ==
The Pachaimalai is spread over an area of 13,468 km^{2} (5,200 sq mi), and forms an extension of the Eastern Ghats in Central Tamil Nadu. The hills vary in elevation between 1,770 ft (540 m) and 4,620 ft (1,410 m). The hills are gneiss formations with a loam soil along the slopes.

The hills along with other associated ranges separate the Kaveri and the Palar River basins. The hills receive an average annual rainfall of 800–900 mm (31–35 in), most of which is from the northeast monsoon. It serves as a catchment area for about 30 lakes situated at the foothills. The Sweata Nadi and Kallar rivers originate and cascade down the hills. Numerous streams also originate from the hills, forming numerous waterfalls including Koraiyar, Mangalam Aruvi, and Mayil Oothu.

== Flora and fauna ==
The hill slopes are covered with dry evergreen and decidious forests. It is dominated by sal trees on the hill tops, and scrublands occur on the lower slopes. The hills support several fauna including spotted deer, mouse deer, barking deer, sloth bear, slender loris, jungle cat, Indian giant squirrel, toddy cat, bonnet macaque, Indian mongoose, blacknaped hare, and porcupine. Birds sighted in the region include junglefowl, barbet, flycatcher, babbler, myna, munia, flowerpecker, sunbird, parakeet, woodpecker, warbler, Indian pitta, and kingfisher. However, private orchards and coffee plantations have come up in the recent years, which threaten the native vegetation and wildlife.

== People and economy ==
There is a population of indigenous community of Pachaimalaiyali people who occupy the hills. Sengattupatti is a village located atop the hills, which houses a limited population and has some rest houses and dormitories for tourists. Limited agriculture contributes to the economy of the region. Rice, sorghum, peanut, and millets are grown. Coffee, cashew, and pepper are grown in plantations. Cottage industries include mat and basket weaving are run by the locals. The hills are also mined for iron ore, manganese, and zinc. The Government of Tamil Nadu has been promoting the destination for eco-tourism.
