= Paithoor =

Village in Tamil Nadu, India

Paithoor is a village located south of Attur Taluk in Salem District, Tamil Nadu, India.

Farming is the main source of income for the residents.

The distance between Attur to Paithoor is 4.3 miles or 6 km (kilometers) and 915.53 meters.
