= Salem Metro =

Rapid Transit system for the city of Salem, Tamil Nadu

Overview
- Area served: Salem, Salem metropolitan area
- Locale: Salem, Tamilnadu
- Transit type: Rapid Transit
- Line number: 2
- Number of stations: 38
- Chief executive: Chennai Metro Rail Limited (CMRL)
- Headquarters: Salem
- Website: http://www.chennaimetrorail.org

Operation
- Began operation: Proposed
- Operator: CMRL

Technical
- Electrification: 25 kV, 50 Hz AC through overhead catenary
- Average speed: 65 km/h (40 mph)
- Top speed: 80 km/h (50 mph)

Salem Metro is the proposed Metro system for the city of Salem, Tamil Nadu, part of a major expansion of public transport in the city. As Salem city is one of the developed city in Tamilnadu.

== Overview ==
In 2021 Governor of Tamil Nadu, Banwarilal Brohit announced in Legislative assembly that the Government of Tamil Nadu has decided to do a feasibility study for introducing metro rail system in Salem along with, Trichy, Madurai and Tirunelveli. Feasibility studies will be conducted in those cities for the same.

Later, CMRL floated tender for preparing feasibility studies and feasibility study report. Aarvee associates won the bids for Salem metro feasibility studies for ₹38 crores.

== Project timeline ==
- 2011: Central Government announces metro rail projects for Tier II cities.
- 2011: Tamil Nadu Government under CM J. Jayalalithaa shelves the metro rail project in favour of monorail.
- 2021: In June 22 Tamil Nadu Governor announces that feasibility study would be conducted and Detailed Project Report (DPR) will be prepared for Salem Metro by Chennai Metro Rail Limited (CMRL).
- 2022: March 21 CMRL floats tender for Salem Metro's Feasibility studies and feasibility report preparation.
- 2022: July 9 Aarvee Associates wins bids for feasibility studies on Salem MRTS Project for 38 crores.
- 2023: August 1 Chennai metro rail limited reported that, since there are several flyovers in Salem, site factors and land availability is heavily influenced the fixing alignment of the routes. And officials in the works of reviewing alignment with no impact on existing structures.
- 2023: August 14 CMRL officials informed Salem metro project will be implemented in 2 routes which covers 40Km length.
- 2023: September 1 CMRL submitted Detailed Feasibility study report to TamilNadu government. Based on the report, it's planned to construct 40 km metro system in two routes. Corridor 1 from Karuppur to Nallikalpatti and Corridor 2 from Uthamasolapuram (Karapuranathar temple) to Ayothiyapatinam.

== Cost ==
The government has earmarked a sum of about ₹60,000 crore (US$8.4 billion) for metro and monorail projects in Tamil Nadu.

== Corridors ==
=== Proposed corridors ===
Proposed Metro Rail Routes in Salem Based on Feasibility study

Salem Metro
Corridor No	Line	From	To	Roads	Via	Length (km)
1	Corridor 1	Karuppur	Nallikalpatti	Salem - Banglore & Salem - Karur Road &	Salem Junction, 4 Roads, Salem collectorate, Old bus stand, Gugai and Dasanaickenpatty	17.16
2	Corridor 2	Ayothiyapattinam	Uthamasolapuram, Karapuranathar temple	Salem - Chennai & Salem - Coimbatore Road	Maniyanur, Salem old bus stand, Ammapet, and Udayapatty	18.3
Total						35.19
