= Muthunaickenpatti =

- village
- Location in Tamil Nadu, India
- Coordinates: 11°42′45.1″N 78°01′58.8″E
- Country: India
- State: Tamil Nadu
- District: Salem

Area
  - Total: 11.677 km^{2} (4.509 sq mi)
- Elevation: 278 m (912 ft)

Population (2011)
  - Total: 13,912
  - Density: 1,191.4/km^{2} (3,085.7/sq mi)

Languages
  - Official: Tamil
- Time zone: UTC+5:30 (IST)
- Postal code: 636304

Muthunaickenpatti is a panchayat village in Omalur taluk, Salem, Tamil Nadu, India. It is the second most populous village in Omalur taluk.

== Geography ==
Muthunaickenpatti is located at 11°42′45.1″N 78°01′58.8″E. It has an average elevation of 278m(912 ft). The closest town is Omalur 5 km away and 16 km away from the district headquarter Salem. The Lake Nainathaal is located in Muthunaickenpatti.

== Demographics ==
As of 2011 census, Muthunaickenpatti has a total population of 13192 people with 6976 males and 6216 females with 10.01% of population are under the age of 6. The average sex ratio is 891 and the child sex ratio is 901. The average literacy rate of 64.44% with males constituting 72.60% and females constituting 55.28%. It has 3473 households.

== Education ==
=== Schools ===
- Government higher secondary school, Muthunaickenpatti
- G.R. Matriculation School
- Government primary school
