= Veeraganur =

- Panchayat town
- Location in Tamil Nadu, India
- Coordinates: 11.479172°N 78.734552°E
- Country: India
- State: Tamil Nadu
- District: Salem

Area
  - Total: 9 km^{2} (3.5 sq mi)

Population (2011)
  - Total: 11,624
  - Density: 1,300/km^{2} (3,300/sq mi)

Languages
  - Official: Tamil
- Time zone: UTC+5:30 (IST)

Veeraganur is a panchayat town in Gangavalli taluk of Salem district in the Indian state of Tamil Nadu. It is one of the 31 panchayat towns in the district. Spread across an area of 9 km^{2} (3.5 sq mi), it had a population of 11,624 individuals as per the 2011 census.

== Geography and administration ==
Veeraganur is located in Gangavalli taluk of Salem district in the Indian state of Tamil Nadu. It is one of the 31 panchayat towns in the district. Spread across an area of 9 km^{2} (3.5 sq mi), it is located on the highway connecting Attur and Perambalur, at a distance of about 74 km (46 mi) from the district headquarters Salem.

The town panchayat is sub-divided into 15 wards. It is headed by a chairperson, who is elected by the members, who are chosen through direct elections. The town forms part of the Gangavalli Assembly constituency that elects its member to the Tamil Nadu legislative assembly and the Kallakurichi Lok Sabha constituency that elects its member to the Parliament of India.

== Demographics ==
As per the 2011 census, Veeraganur had a population of 11,624 individuals across 3,139 households. The population saw a marginal increase compared to the previous census in 2001 when 10,547 inhabitants were registered. The population consisted of 5,736 males and 5,888 females. About 1,216 individuals were below the age of six years. About 33.1% of the population belonged to scheduled castes and 1.2% belonged to scheduled tribes. The entire population is classified as urban. The town has an average literacy rate of 72.9%.

About 53.7% of the eligible population were employed full-time, of which majority were involved in agriculture and allied activities. Hinduism was the majority religion which was followed by 95.7% of the population, with Islam (3.4%) and Christianity (0.9%) being minor religions.

== Trivia ==
The town is mentioned in the 2025 film Maareesan.
