= Karapuranathar Temple =

Temple to Shiva in Salem district, Tamil Nadu, India

Religion
- Affiliation: Hinduism
- District: Salem district
- Deity: Shiva

Location
- Location: Uthamacholapuram
- State: Tamil Nadu
- Country: India
- Interactive map of Karapuranathar Temple
- Coordinates: 11.612326°N 78.103402°E

Architecture
- Type: South Indian, Kovil
- Established: Before 1200 years

Karapuranathar (Tamil: கரபுரநாதர்) temple is an ancient temple in Salem District of the Indian state of Tamil Nadu. The main deity is Shiva in lingasorubam. The temple is located near the west bank of Thirumanimutharu river at Uthamacholapuram. The lingam is suyambu. The name Karapuranathar is a compound of Karai ("riverbank"), Puram ("place"), and Nather ("Lord").

== History ==
The temple was built in the 9th century CE. A scholar told lord shiva was called Karapuranathar the name derived for Karadhushan was pray shiva, the lord tested his devotion. He did not get the prize so he immolated himself. For showing this great devotion the lord extinguished the fire.

During sangam era, south India was ruled by many local kings. They were all to pay tax to the three Emperors of South India (Cholas, Pandyas, Cheras). One of these kings, Vēl Pāri, is described as the master of the hill country of Parambu nādu and held sway over 300 villages. Pari patronized various forms of art, literature and bards thronged his court. The territory of Parambu nādu consisted of parts of modern-day Tamil Nadu and Kerala, stretching from Piranmalai in Sivaganga district, Tamil Nadu to Nedungadi in Palakkad district, Kerala. His favorite was poet Kapilar who was his close friend and lifelong companion. Kapilar wrote 107 songs.

Pari planned war against the three Emperors. Malaimanpari was defeated and killed by the armies of the emperors. Malaimanpari's two daughters Angavai and Sangavai were saved by Kapilar. Kapilar asked many kings to marry off their sons to Malaimanpari's daughters without success.

Avvaiyar was an ancient female poet who was a mutual friend of Kabilar and the three kings. So Kapilar requested Avvaiyar's help to save Pari's daughters. She accepted his request. Pāri's death affected Kabilar and he later took his own life by vadakirrutal, a Tamil way of committing suicide. He sat facing north and starved himself to death in Kabilar Kundru.

Pāri's daughters married in the temple to the son of Malaiyamān Thirumudi Kāri with the Emperor's acceptance. The Chola Emperor was staying in Uthamacholopuram. The Pandiya Emperor was staying in Virapandy near the temple. The Chera Emperor was staying in Salem in order to attend Angavai and Sangavai's marriages.
