= Yercaud block =

Coordinates: 11.7794°N 78.2034°E

Yercaud block is a revenue block of Salem district of the Indian state of Tamil Nadu. This revenue block consists of 9 panchayat villages. They are:

- Manjakuttai
- Maramangalam
- Nagalur
- Semmanatham
- Thalaisolai
- Vazhavanthi
- Vellakkadai
- Velur
- Yercaud
