= Veerapandi block =

Coordinates: 11°34′32″N 78°04′06″E

Veerapandi block is a revenue block of Salem district of the Indian state of Tamil Nadu. This revenue block consist of 25 panchayat villages. They are,

1. Akkarapalayam
2. Anaikuttapatti
3. Ariyagoundampatti
4. Chennagiri
5. Ettimanickampatti
6. Inambiroji
7. Kadathur Agr.
8. Kalparapatti
9. Keerapappambadi
10. Maramangalathupatti
11. Marulayampalayam
12. Mooduthurai
13. Murungapatti
14. Papparapatti
15. Periya Seeragapadi
16. Perumagoundampatti
17. Perumampatti
18. Poolavari
19. Puthur Agr.
20. Rajapalayam
21. Rakkipatti
22. Senaipalayam
23. Uthamasolapuram
24. Veerapandi
25. Vembadithalam
