= Sentharapatti =

- Panchayat town
- Location in Tamil Nadu, India
- Coordinates: 11°26′57″N 78°31′28″E
- Country: India
- State: Tamil Nadu
- District: Salem

Area
  - Total: 9 km^{2} (3.5 sq mi)

Population (2011)
  - Total: 14,308
  - Density: 1,600/km^{2} (4,100/sq mi)

Languages
  - Official: Tamil
- Time zone: UTC+5:30 (IST)

Sentharapatti is a panchayat town in Gangavalli taluk of Salem district in the Indian state of Tamil Nadu. It is one of the 31 panchayat towns in the district. Spread across an area of 9 km^{2} (3.5 sq mi), it had a population of 14,308 individuals as per the 2011 census.

== Geography and administration ==
Sentharapatti is located in Gangavalli taluk of Salem district in the Indian state of Tamil Nadu. Spread across an area of 9 km^{2} (3.5 sq mi), it is one of the 31 panchayat towns in the district. The town panchayat is headed by a chairperson, who is elected by the members, who are chosen through direct elections. The town forms part of the Gangavalli Assembly constituency that elects its member to the Tamil Nadu legislative assembly and the Kallakurichi Lok Sabha constituency that elects its member to the Parliament of India.

== Demographics ==
As per the 2011 census, Sentharapatti had a population of 14,308 individuals across 3,895 households. The population saw a marginal increase compared to the previous census in 2001 when 13,896 inhabitants were registered. The population consisted of 7,067 males and 7,241 females. About 1,365 individuals were below the age of six years. About 33.5% of the population belonged to scheduled castes. The entire population is classified as urban. The town has an average literacy rate of 71.3%.

About 50.6% of the eligible population were employed, of which majority were involved in agriculture and allied activities. Hinduism was the majority religion which was followed by 89.9% of the population, with Christianity (7.4%) and Islam (2.7%) being minor religions.
