= Veerapandi, Salem =

Veerapandi
- Town
- Location in Salem, India Veerapandi (Tamil Nadu) Veerapandi (India)
- Coordinates: 11°34′53″N 78°04′32″E
- Country: India
- State: Tamil Nadu
- Region: Kongu Nadu
- District: Salem
- Metro: Salem Metropolitan Area

Languages
  - Official: Tamil
- Time zone: UTC+5:30 (IST)
- PIN: 636308
- Telephone code: 91-427
- Vehicle registration: TN-90

Veerapandi is a suburb of Salem, Tamil Nadu, India, 14 km from the old bus stand, 13 km from the new bus stand and 14 km from Salem Junction. Today it has the main college area in Salem. The biggest center for higher learning is the Vinayaga Missions University near Veerapandi.

== Temples ==
It had lot of Hindu religious Temples, especially 1008 Shiv Linnga and several religious temples. It have Church too. Around 4 kilometere.

== Festivals ==
The main festivals such as marriyaman kovil, angalamman kovil, etc. take place in the city. In the month of April the marriyaman festival is celebrated around 15 Days with lot of formalities and procedures.

== Economy ==
The main occupation is agriculture.. Textiles and finance are common business in this area. Both Genders have been working all around the city.

== Amenities ==
In general Veerapandi has all its basic amenities and has road transport connections with the nearby town of Salem.".

It has a railway station name is Virapandy road railway station with passenger train service to go to Erode and Salem Junction.

It has a government high school and elementary school.

It has polytechnic Colleges

- Kongu Polytechnic College
- Rajaji Indtitute of Technology

It has Medical College

- Vinayaka Mission Kirubananda Variyar Medical College

It has Engineering College

- Annapoorana Engineering College
- Vinayaka Mission Kirubananda Variyar Engineering College

It has Arts & Science College

- VMKV Arts & Science College

It has Physical Education College

- Vinayaka Missions College of Physical Education

== Politics ==
Veerapandi assembly constituency is part of Salem (Lok Sabha constituency).
