= Narasingapuram, Salem =

Coordinates: 11°35′53″N 78°34′30″E

Narasingapuram
- town
- Interactive map of Narasingapuram
- Country: India
- State: Tamil Nadu
- District: Salem

Population (2011)
  - Total: 23,084

Languages
  - Official: Tamil
- Time zone: UTC+5:30 (IST)
- Postal code: 636108

Narasingapuram is a municipality in Attur Taluk, Salem district in the Indian state of Tamil Nadu. As of 2011, the town had a population of 23,084.

== Demographics ==
Religious census
Religion	Percent(%)
Hindu	93.96%
Muslim	3.76%
Christian	2.14%
Sikh	0.1%
Buddhist	0.0%
Jain	0.0%
Other	0.04%
No religion	0.0%

According to 2011 census, Narasingapuram had a population of 23,084 with a sex-ratio of 1,003 females for every 1,000 males, much above the national average of 929. A total of 2,230 were under the age of six, constituting 1,122 males and 1,108 females. Scheduled Castes and Scheduled Tribes accounted for 21.05% and .98% of the population respectively. The average literacy of the town was 74.58%, compared to the national average of 72.99%. The town had a total of : 6230 households. There were a total of 9,587 workers, comprising 1,545 cultivators, 2,095 main agricultural labourers, 163 in house hold industries, 5,379 other workers, 405 marginal workers, 7 marginal cultivators, 99 marginal agricultural labourers, 21 marginal workers in household industries and 278 other marginal workers. As per the religious census of 2011, Narasingapuram (M) had 93.96% Hindus, 3.76% Muslims, 2.14% Christians, 0.1% Sikhs, 0.0% Buddhists, 0.0% Jains, 0.04% following other religions and 0.0% following no religion or did not indicate any religious preference.
