= Thedavur =

- Panchayat town
- Location in Tamil Nadu, India
- Coordinates: 11°29′45″N 78°41′42″E
- Country: India
- State: Tamil Nadu
- District: Salem

Area
  - Total: 8 km^{2} (3.1 sq mi)

Population (2011)
  - Total: 8,230
  - Density: 1,000/km^{2} (2,700/sq mi)

Languages
  - Official: Tamil
- Time zone: UTC+5:30 (IST)

Thedavur is a panchayat town in Gangavalli taluk of Salem district in the Indian state of Tamil Nadu. It is one of the 31 panchayat towns in the district. Spread across an area of 8 km^{2} (3.1 sq mi), it had a population of 8,230 individuals as per the 2011 census.

== Geography and administration ==
Thedavur is located in Gangavalli taluk of Salem district in the Indian state of Tamil Nadu. It is one of the 31 panchayat towns in the district. Spread across an area of 8 km^{2} (3.1 sq mi), it is located about 75 km (47 mi) from district headquarters Salem. The town panchayat is sub-divided into 15 wards. It is headed by a chairperson, who is elected by the members, who are chosen through direct elections. The town forms part of the Gangavalli Assembly constituency that elects its member to the Tamil Nadu legislative assembly and the Kallakurichi Lok Sabha constituency that elects its member to the Parliament of India.

== Demographics ==
As per the 2011 census, Thedavur had a population of 8,230 individuals across 2,241 households. The population saw a marginal increase compared to the previous census in 2001 when 7,461 inhabitants were registered. The population consisted of 4,158 males and 4,072 females. About 932 individuals were below the age of six years. About 12% of the population belonged to scheduled castes. The entire population is classified as urban. The town has an average literacy rate of 69.8%.

About 49.6% of the eligible population were employed, of which majority were involved in agriculture and allied activities. Hinduism was the majority religion which was followed by 98.7% of the population, with Christianity (0.6%) and Islam (0.7%) being minor religions.
