= Mallamooppampatti =

- Census town
- Location in Salem, India Mallamooppampatti (Tamil Nadu) Mallamooppampatti (India)
- Coordinates: 11°40′43″N 78°04′29″E
- Country: India
- State: Tamil Nadu
- District: Salem
- Metro: Salem Metropolitan Area

Population (2001)
  - Total: 6,783

Languages
  - Official: Tamil
- Time zone: UTC+5:30 (IST)

Mallamooppampatti is a census town in Salem district in the Indian state of Tamil Nadu.

== Demographics ==
As of 2001 India census, Mallamooppampatti had a population of 6783. Males constitute 52% of the population and females 48%. Mallamooppampatti has an average literacy rate of 53%, lower than the national average of 59.5%: male literacy is 61%, and female literacy is 45%. In Mallamooppampatti, 13% of the population is under 6 years of age.
