= Maramangalathupatti =

Town in Tamil Nadu

- Census town
- Location in Salem, India Maramangalathupatti (Tamil Nadu) Maramangalathupatti (India)
- Coordinates: 11°40′24″N 78°03′39″E
- Country: India
- State: Tamil Nadu
- District: Salem
- Metro: Salem Metropolitan Area

Population (2001)
  - Total: 11,378

Languages
  - Official: Tamil
- Time zone: UTC+5:30 (IST)

Maramangalathupatti is a census town in Salem district in the Indian state of Tamil Nadu.

== Demographics ==
As of 2001 India census, Maramangalathupatti had a population of 11,378. Males constitute 51% of the population and females 49%. Maramangalathupatti has an average literacy rate of 69%, higher than the national average of 59.5%: male literacy is 74%, and female literacy is 63%. In Maramangalathupatti, 11% of the population is under 6 years of age.
