= Amaragunthi =

Amarakunthi Amarakundhi, Amarakunthi
- village
- Location in Tamil Nadu, India Amarakunthi (India)
- Coordinates: 11°44′N 77°58′E
- Country: India
- State: Tamil Nadu
- District: Salem
- Town Panchayat: Taramangalam

Area
  - Total: 6.4926 km^{2} (2.5068 sq mi)

Population (2011)
  - Total: 6,100
  - Density: 940/km^{2} (2,400/sq mi)

Languages
  - Official: Tamil
- Time zone: UTC+5:30 (IST)
- PIN: 636503
- Website: https://www.facebook.com/amaragunthivillage

Amarakunthi is a village in the Taramangalam Taluk in Salem District of Tamil Nadu, India.

== Geography ==
Amarakunthi is located 29 km west of District headquarters in Salem, 9 km from Taramangalam and 338 km from the State capital Chennai.

Other nearby villages are Banapuram, Tholasampatti, Periyasoragai, U.maramangalam, and Nangavalli. Amarakunthi is bordered by Taramangalam to the south, Mecheri to the north, Omalur Taluk to the east, and Kadaiyampatty to the west.

== Transport ==
The two closest rail stations nearby are Tolasampatti and Mecheri Road. The closest major rail station is Salem Jn Rail Way Station 23 km away.

== About Amaragundhi ==
Amaragundhi is a village in Taramangalam Block in Salem District of Tamil Nadu State, India. It is located 27 km towards west from District headquarters Salem. 4 km from Taramangalam. 339 km from State capital Chennai

Amaragundhi Pin code is 636503 and postal head office is Tholasampatti.

Arurpatti ( 2 km ), Ramireddipatti ( 3 km ), Taramangalam ( 3 km ), Periyeripatti ( 3 km ), Chinnasoragai ( 4 km ) are the nearby Villages to Amaragundhi. Amaragundhi is surrounded by Nangavalli Block towards west, Mecheri Block towards North, Omalur Block towards East, Konganapuram Block towards South .

Tharamangalam, P.N.Patti, Salem, Sankari are the nearby Cities to Amaragundhi.

== Amarakundhi 2011 Census Details ==
Amaragundhi Local Language is Tamil. Amarakundhi Village Total population is 6100 and number of houses are 1567. Female Population is 47.2%. Village literacy rate is 60.0% and the Female Literacy rate is 24.2%.

== Population ==
Census Parameter Census Data Total Population 6100 Total No of Houses 1567 Female Population % 47.2% ( 2881) Total Literacy rate % 60.0% ( 3663) Female Literacy rate 24.2% ( 1475) Scheduled Tribes Population % 0.0% ( 0) Scheduled Caste Population % 5.6% ( 341) Working Population % 42.9% Child(0 -6) Population by 2011 644 Girl Child(0 -6) Population % by 2011 48.8% ( 314)

== Politics in Amaragundhi ==
DMK, AIADMK, TMC(M), PMK, ADMK are the major political parties in this area.

== Polling Stations / Booths near Amaragundhi ==
1)Pums P Kalipatty 636455 2)Pums Palakkaranoor(arurpatty) 636502 3)Ghs M.olaipatti 636503 4)Ghs Sedapatti(arurpatty) 636502 5)Pues Velagoundanur 636455

== HOW TO REACH Amaragundhi ==
By Rail Mecheri Road Rail Way Station, Omalur Junction Rail Way Station are the very nearby railway stations to Amaragundhi.

== Temple ==
- Meenakshi Sokanathar Temple, Periya Maariyamna Temple, Chinna Maariyaman Temple, Periyandichiamman Temple, Anjineyer Temple, Angalamman Temple, Sri Ramalinga Sowdeswari Amman temple
