= Keeripatti =

- Panchayat town
- Location in Tamil Nadu, India
- Coordinates: 11°31′15″N 78°29′36″E
- Country: India
- State: Tamil Nadu
- District: Salem

Area
  - Total: 16 km^{2} (6.2 sq mi)

Population (2011)
  - Total: 10,208
  - Density: 640/km^{2} (1,700/sq mi)

Languages
  - Official: Tamil
- Time zone: UTC+5:30 (IST)

Keeripatti is a panchayat town in Attur taluk of Salem district in the Indian state of Tamil Nadu. It is one of the 31 panchayat towns in the district. Spread across an area of 16 km^{2} (6.2 sq mi), it had a population of 10,208 individuals as per the 2011 census.

== Geography and administration ==
Keeripatti is located in Attur taluk of Salem district in the Indian state of Tamil Nadu. Spread across an area of 16 km^{2} (6.2 sq mi), it is one of the 31 panchayat towns in the district. The town panchayat is headed by a chairperson, who is elected by the members, who are chosen through direct elections. The town forms part of the Attur Assembly constituency that elects its member to the Tamil Nadu legislative assembly and the Kallakurichi Lok Sabha constituency that elects its member to the Parliament of India.

== Demographics ==
As per the 2011 census, Keeripatti had a population of 10,208 individuals across 2,584 households. The population saw a marginal increase compared to the previous census in 2001 when 9,164 inhabitants were registered. The population consisted of 5,174 males and 5,034 females. About 1,027 individuals were below the age of six years. About 14.4% of the population belonged to scheduled castes and 8.5% belonged to scheduled tribes. The entire population is classified as urban. The town has an average literacy rate of 76%.

About 51.3% of the eligible population were employed, of which majority were involved in agriculture and allied activities. Hinduism was the majority religion which was followed by 98.9% of the population, with Christianity (0.6%) and Islam (0.4%) being minor religions.
