= Thammampatti =

- Panchayat town
- Location in Tamil Nadu, India
- Coordinates: 11°26′17″N 78°29′01″E
- Country: India
- State: Tamil Nadu
- District: Salem
- Taluk: Gangavalli

Area
  - Total: 8 km^{2} (3.1 sq mi)

Population (2011)
  - Total: 21,503
  - Density: 2,700/km^{2} (7,000/sq mi)

Languages
  - Official: Tamil
- Time zone: UTC+5:30 (IST)

Thammampatti is a panchayat town in Gangavalli taluk of Salem district in the Indian state of Tamil Nadu. It is one of the 31 panchayat towns in the district. Spread across an area of 8 km^{2} (3.1 sq mi), it had a population of 21,503 individuals as per the 2011 census. Thammampatti wood carving from the region is recognized as a Geographical Indication.

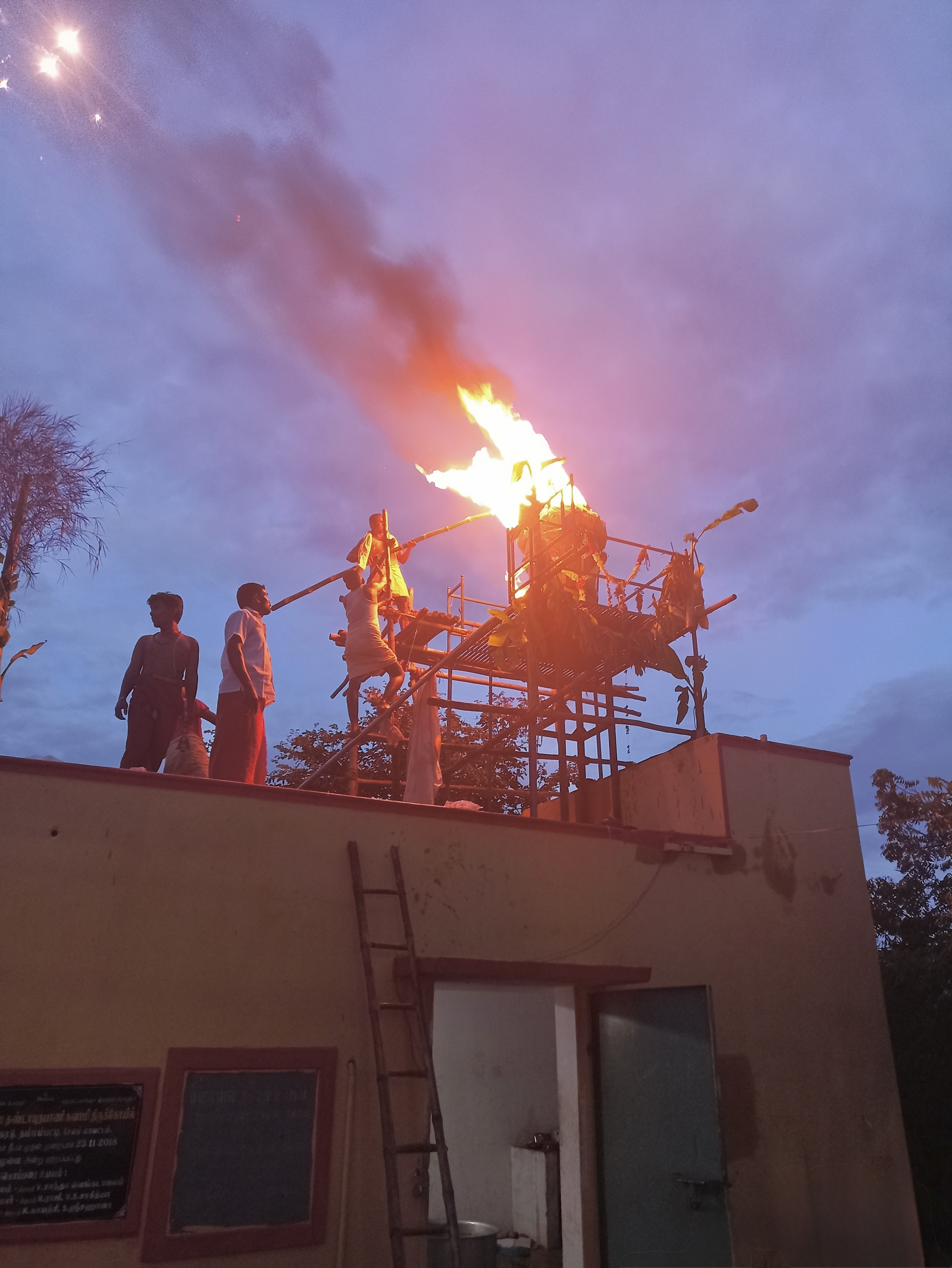
Karthigai Peruvilakku at Thammampatty, 2021

== Geography and administration ==
Thammampatti is located in Gangavalli taluk of Salem district in the Indian state of Tamil Nadu. Spread across an area of 8 km^{2} (3.1 sq mi), it is one of the 31 panchayat towns in the district. The town panchayat is headed by a chairperson, who is elected by the members, who are chosen through direct elections. The town forms part of the Gangavalli Assembly constituency that elects its member to the Tamil Nadu legislative assembly and the Kallakurichi Lok Sabha constituency that elects its member to the Parliament of India.

== Demographics ==
As per the 2011 census, Thammampatti had a population of 21,503 individuals across 5,756 households. The population saw a marginal increase compared to the previous census in 2001 when 20,751 inhabitants were registered. The population consisted of 10,765 males and 10,738 females. About 2,068 individuals were below the age of six years. About 24.7% of the population belonged to scheduled castes and 0.8% belonged to scheduled tribes. The entire population is classified as urban. The town has an average literacy rate of 80.8%. Hinduism was the majority religion which was followed by 77.3% of the population, with Christianity (11.7%) and Islam (10.9%) being minor religions.

About 50.4% of the eligible population were employed full-time, of which majority were involved in agriculture and allied activities. Thammampatti wood carving from the region was recognized as a Geographical Indication in 2023.
