= Gangavalli =

- Panchayat town
- Location in Tamil Nadu, India
- Coordinates: 11.48°N 78.65°E
- Country: India
- State: Tamil Nadu
- District: Salem

Area
  - Total: 4 km^{2} (1.5 sq mi)

Population (2011)
  - Total: 12,015
  - Density: 3,000/km^{2} (7,800/sq mi)

Languages
  - Official: Tamil
- Time zone: UTC+5:30 (IST)

Gangavalli is a panchayat town in Gangavalli taluk of Salem district in the Indian state of Tamil Nadu. It is one of the 31 panchayat towns in the district. Spread across an area of 4 km^{2} (1.5 sq mi), it had a population of 12,015 individuals as per the 2011 census.

== Geography and administration ==
Gangavalli is located in of Salem district in the Indian state of Tamil Nadu. It is the administrative headquarters of Gangavalli taluk. Spread across an area of 4 km^{2} (1.5 sq mi), it is situated off the road connecting Attur with Veeraganur. It is located about 75 km (47 mi) from the district headquarters Salem. It is one of the 31 panchayat towns in the district. The region has a tropical climate with hot summers and mild winters. The highest temperatures are recorded in April and May, with lowest recordings in December-January.

The town panchayat is sub-divided into 15 wards. It is headed by a chairperson, who is elected by the members, who are chosen through direct elections. The town forms part of the Gangavalli Assembly constituency that elects its member to the Tamil Nadu legislative assembly and the Kallakurichi Lok Sabha constituency that elects its member to the Parliament of India.

== Demographics ==
As per the 2011 census, Gangavalli had a population of 12,015 individuals across 3,124 households. The population saw a marginal increase compared to the previous census in 2001 when 10,457 inhabitants were registered. The population consisted of 5,907 males and 6,108 females. About 1,252 individuals were below the age of six years. About 29.5% of the population belonged to scheduled castes. The entire population is classified as urban. The town has an average literacy rate of 75.5%.

About 49.5% of the eligible population were employed full-time, of which majority were involved in agriculture and allied activities. Hinduism was the majority religion which was followed by 84.2% of the population, with Islam (12.2%) and Christianity (3.5%) being minor religions.
