= Dhasekar =

- village
- Country: India
- State: Tamil Nadu
- District: Salem

Languages
  - Official: Tamil
- Time zone: UTC+5:30 (IST)
- Vehicle registration: TN-
- Coastline: 0 kilometres (0 mi)

Dhasekar, Sekkaptipatti, is a village in the Salem District of Tamil Nadu, India.
