= Sowriyur =

- village
- Country: India
- State: Tamil Nadu
- District: Salem

Languages
  - Official: Tamil
- Time zone: UTC+5:30 (IST)
- Vehicle registration: TN-

Sowriyur is a village in Salem district, Tamil Nadu, India. It is famous for cloth manufacturing and silk sarees. The postal pin code is 636501.

There are lot of temples of the gods Vinayagar, Murugar, Nagalingeshwarar, Vishnu, and Mariamman. The famous Festival of God Sri Muthumariamman temple celebration in the month of march every year is well-known by the surrounding places.
