= Tharamangalam block =

Revenue block in Salem, Tamil Nadu, India

Tharamangalam block is a revenue block of Salem district of the Indian state of Tamil Nadu. This revenue block consist of 17 panchayat villages. They are,

1. Alagusamudram
2. Amaragundhi
3. Ariyampatti
4. Arurpatti
5. Desavilakku
6. Duttampatti
7. Edayapatti
8. Elavampatti
9. Karukkalvadi
10. Kurukkupatti
11. Mallikuttai
12. Manathal
13. Panikkanur
14. Pappampadi
15. Ramireddipatti
16. Selavadai
17. T. Konagapadi
