= Kannankurichi =

- Panchayat town
- Location in Tamil Nadu, India
- Coordinates: 11.6989°N 78.1790°E
- Country: India
- State: Tamil Nadu
- District: Salem

Area
  - Total: 5.2 km^{2} (2.0 sq mi)

Population (2011)
  - Total: 19,765
  - Density: 3,800/km^{2} (9,800/sq mi)

Languages
  - Official: Tamil
- Time zone: UTC+5:30 (IST)

Kannankurichi is a panchayat town in Salem taluk of Salem district in the Indian state of Tamil Nadu. It is one of the 31 panchayat towns in the district. Spread across an area of 5.2 km^{2} (2.0 sq mi), it had a population of 19,765 individuals as per the 2011 census.

== Geography and administration ==
Kannankurichi is located in Salem taluk of Salem district in the Indian state of Tamil Nadu. Spread across an area of 5.2 km^{2} (2.0 sq mi), it is situated at the foothills of Yercaud. It is one of the 31 panchayat towns in the district. The town panchayat is headed by a chairperson, who is elected by the members, who are chosen through direct elections. The town forms part of the Salem North Assembly constituency that elects its member to the Tamil Nadu legislative assembly and the Salem Lok Sabha constituency that elects its member to the Parliament of India.

== Demographics ==
As per the 2011 census, Kannankurichi had a population of 19,765 individuals across 5,022 households. The population saw a marginal increase compared to the previous census in 2001 when 14,994 inhabitants were registered. The population consisted of 9,995 males and 9,770 females. About 2,015 individuals were below the age of six years. About 13.2% of the population belonged to scheduled castes. The entire population is classified as urban. The town has an average literacy rate of 79.4%.

About 42.5% of the eligible population were employed, of which majority were involved in agriculture and allied activities. Hinduism was the majority religion which was followed by 97.4% of the population, with Christianity (1.6%) and Islam (0.9%) being minor religions.
