= Panaimarathupatti =

- Panchayat town
- Location in Tamil Nadu, India
- Coordinates: 11.5640°N 78.1652°E
- Country: India
- State: Tamil Nadu
- District: Salem

Area
  - Total: 12 km^{2} (4.6 sq mi)

Population (2011)
  - Total: 9,368
  - Density: 780/km^{2} (2,000/sq mi)

Languages
  - Official: Tamil
- Time zone: UTC+5:30 (IST)

Panaimarathupatti is a panchayat town in Salem taluk of Salem district in the Indian state of Tamil Nadu. It is one of the 31 panchayat towns in the district. Spread across an area of 12 km^{2} (4.6 sq mi), it had a population of 9,368 individuals as per the 2011 census.

== Geography and administration ==
Panaimarathupatti is located in Salem taluk of Salem district in the Indian state of Tamil Nadu. Spread across an area of 12 km^{2} (4.6 sq mi), it is one of the 31 panchayat towns in the district. It is located about 12 km (7.5 mi) from the district headquarters Salem.

The town panchayat is sub-divided into 15 wards. It is headed by a chairperson, who is elected by the members, who are chosen through direct elections. The town forms part of the Veerapandi Assembly constituency that elects its member to the Tamil Nadu legislative assembly and the Salem Lok Sabha constituency that elects its member to the Parliament of India.

== Demographics ==
As per the 2011 census, Panaimarathupatti had a population of 9,368 individuals across 2,468 households. The population saw a marginal increase compared to the previous census in 2001 when 8,125 inhabitants were registered. The population consisted of 4,663 males and 4,705 females. About 906 individuals were below the age of six years. About 24.9% of the population belonged to scheduled castes. The entire population is classified as urban. The town has an average literacy rate of 75.2%.

About 50% of the eligible population were employed full-time, of which majority were involved in agriculture and allied activities. Hinduism was the majority religion which was followed by 98.4% of the population, with Christianity (1%) and Islam (0.6%) being minor religions.
