= Yercaud taluk =

Coordinates: 11.7794°N 78.2034°E

Yercaud taluk is a taluk of Salem district of the Indian state of Tamil Nadu. The headquarters of the taluk is the town of Yercaud.

== Demographics ==
According to the 2011 census, the taluk of Yercaud had a population of 41,832 with 21,047 males and 20,785 females. There were 988 women for every 1000 men. The taluk had a literacy rate of 56.38. Child population in the age group below 6 was 2,214 Males and 2,117 Females.
