= Kadayampatti =

- Panchayat town
- Location in Tamil Nadu, India
- Coordinates: 11°52′11″N 78°06′41″E
- Country: India
- State: Tamil Nadu
- District: Salem

Area
  - Total: 3.61 km^{2} (1.39 sq mi)

Population (2011)
  - Total: 11,390
  - Density: 3,160/km^{2} (8,170/sq mi)

Languages
  - Official: Tamil
- Time zone: UTC+5:30 (IST)

Kadayampatti is a panchayat town in Omalur taluk of Salem district in the Indian state of Tamil Nadu. It is one of the 31 panchayat towns in the district. Spread across an area of 3.61 km^{2} (1.39 sq mi), it had a population of 11,390 individuals as per the 2011 census.

== Geography and administration ==
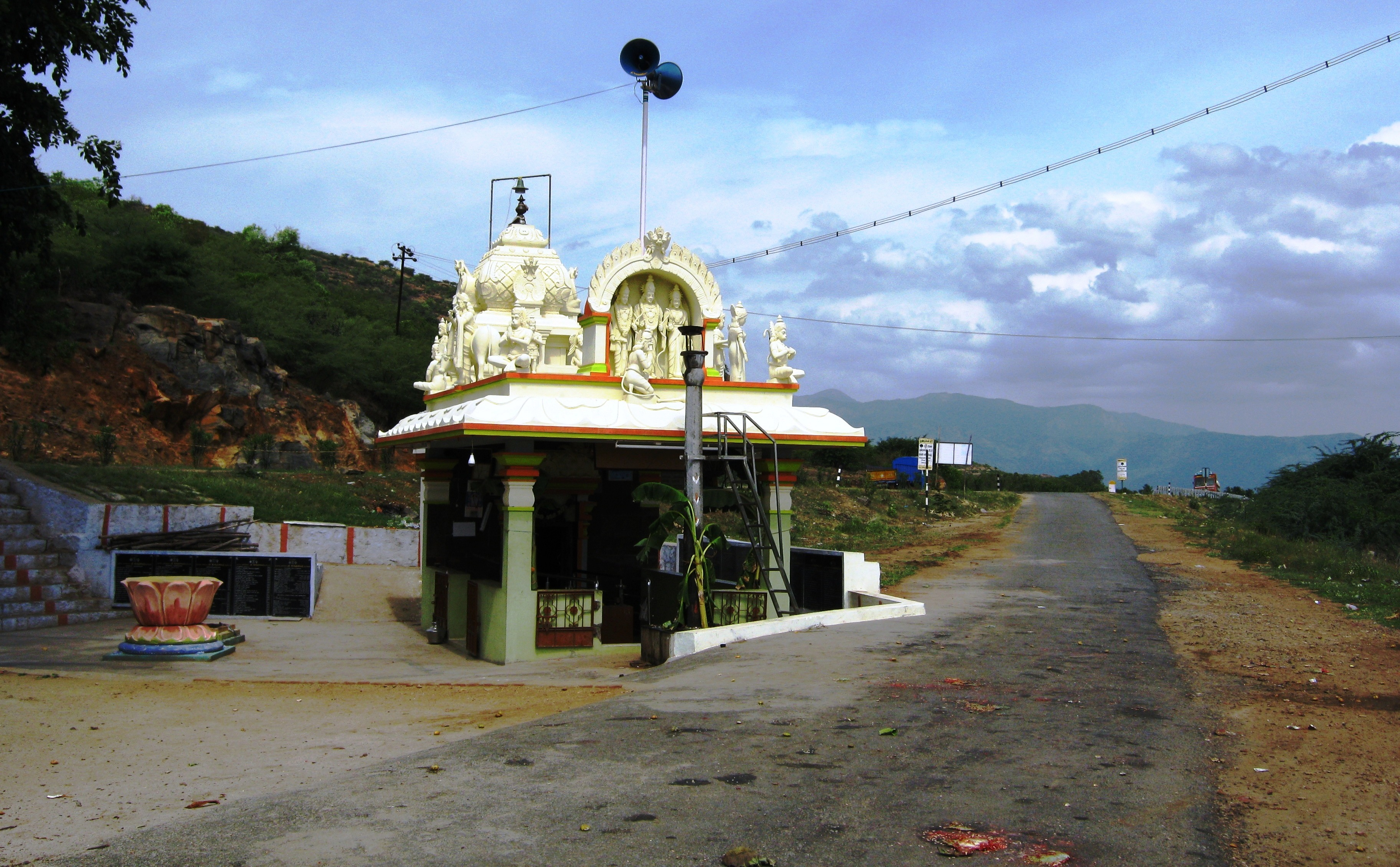
Gundakkal Sri Anchaneyar Swamy Temple

Kadayampatti is located in Omalur taluk of Salem district in the Indian state of Tamil Nadu. Spread across an area of 3.61 km^{2} (1.39 sq mi), it is located on the highway connecting Salem and Dharmapuri. It is one of the 31 panchayat towns in the district. The town panchayat is sub-divided into 15 wards. It is headed by a chairperson, who is elected by the members, who are chosen through direct elections. The town forms part of the Omalur Assembly constituency that elects its member to the Tamil Nadu legislative assembly and the Salem Lok Sabha constituency that elects its member to the Parliament of India.

== Demographics ==
As per the 2011 census, Kadayampatti had a population of 11,390 individuals across 2,857 households. The population saw a marginal increase compared to the previous census in 2001 when 9,565 inhabitants were registered. The population consisted of 5,920 males and 5,470 females. About 1,229 individuals were below the age of six years. About 37.3% of the population belonged to scheduled castes. The entire population is classified as urban. The town has an average literacy rate of 69.7%.

About 51.1% of the eligible population were employed full-time, of which majority were involved in agriculture and allied activities. Hinduism was the majority religion which was followed by 97.8% of the population, with Christianity (1.1%) and Islam (1.1%) being minor religions.
