= Salem block =

Salem block is a revenue block of Salem district of the Indian state of Tamil Nadu. This revenue block consist of 14 panchayat villages:

1. Andipatti
2. Ayyamperumampatti
3. Chettichavadi
4. Dhalavaipatti
5. Erumapalayam
6. Inamvedugathampatti
7. Kondappanaickenpatti
8. Majaragollapatti
9. Mallamooppampatti
