= Magudanchavadi block =

Coordinates: 11°32′54″N 77°58′42″E

Magudanchavadi block is a revenue block in the Salem district of Tamil Nadu, India.
