= Elampillai =

Elampillai Ilampillai
- Panchayat town
- Location in Tamil Nadu, India
- Coordinates: 11.606°N 78.007°E
- Country: India
- State: Tamil Nadu
- District: Salem
- Taluk: Salem South

Area
  - Total: 2.76 km^{2} (1.07 sq mi)

Population (2011)
  - Total: 11,797
  - Density: 4,270/km^{2} (11,100/sq mi)

Languages
  - Official: Tamil
- Time zone: UTC+5:30 (IST)

Elampillai or Ilampillai is a panchayat town in Salem South taluk of Salem district in the Indian state of Tamil Nadu. It is one of the 31 panchayat towns in the district. Spread across an area of 2.76 km^{2} (1.07 sq mi), it had a population of 11,796 individuals as per the 2011 census.

== Geography and administration ==
Elampillai is located in Salem South taluk of Salem district in the Indian state of Tamil Nadu. Spread across an area of 2.76 km^{2} (1.07 sq mi), it is located at the foothills of Kanchamalai hills. It is one of the 31 panchayat towns in the district. The region has a tropical climate with hot summers and mild winters. The highest temperatures are recorded in April and May, with lowest recordings in December–January.

The town panchayat is divided into 15 wards. It is headed by a chairperson, who is elected by the members, who are chosen through direct elections. The town forms part of the Veerapandi Assembly constituency that elects its member to the Tamil Nadu legislative assembly and the Salem Lok Sabha constituency that elects its member to the Parliament of India.

== Demographics ==
As per the 2011 census, Elampillai had a population of 11,796 individuals across 3,057 households. The population saw a marginal increase compared to the previous census in 2001 when 10,615 inhabitants were registered. The population consisted of 3,547 males and 3,674 females. About 1,126 individuals were below the age of six years. About 3.2% of the population belonged to scheduled castes and 1.6% belonged to scheduled tribes. The entire population is classified as urban. The town has an average literacy rate of 84%.

About 47.7% of the eligible population were employed, of which majority were involved in agriculture and allied activities. Hinduism was the majority religion which was followed by 96.4% of the population, with Islam (3.2%) and Christianity (0.4%) being minor religions.
