= Edaganasalai =

Town in Tamil Nadu, India

Edanganasalai
- Municipality
- Location in Tamil Nadu, India
- Coordinates: 11.6278°N 78.0023°E
- Country: India
- State: Tamil Nadu
- District: Salem
- Taluk: Sankari

Government
  - Type: Municipality
  - Body: Edanganasalai Municipality

Area
  - Total: 24 km^{2} (9.3 sq mi)

Population (2011)
  - Total: 33,245
  - Density: 1,400/km^{2} (3,600/sq mi)

Languages
  - Official: Tamil
- Time zone: UTC+5:30 (IST)
- PIN: 637502
- Vehicle registration: TN-52
- Website: https://www.tnurbantree.tn.gov.in/edanganasalai/

Edanganasalai (also spelled Edaganasalai) is a municipality in Sankari taluk of Salem district in the Indian state of Tamil Nadu. It was upgraded from a town panchayat to a municipality in 2021 as part of statewide urban local body reforms.

== Geography and administration ==
Edanganasalai is located in Sankari taluk of Salem district in the Indian state of Tamil Nadu. It covers an area of 24 square kilometres (9.3 sq mi).

The municipality is governed by a commissioner and consists of 18 wards. It forms part of the Sankari Assembly constituency, which elects a member to the Tamil Nadu Legislative Assembly, and the Namakkal parliamentary constituency, which elects a member to the Lok Sabha.

== Demographics ==
As per the 2011 Census of India, Edanganasalai had a population of 33,245 across 8,631 households, with a marginal increase from 29,635 in the 2001 census. The population consisted of 17,609 males and 15,636 females. Children below the age of six numbered 3,546. Scheduled castes comprised about 3.8% of the population, and scheduled tribes about 2%. The entire population is classified as urban, with an average literacy rate of 68.1%.

The town has a large textile industry employing significant portion of the population. In addition, it also has agriculture and allied activities. Hinduism is the predominant religion (99.3%), followed by small minorities of Christians (0.4%) and Muslims (0.3%).
