= Omalur =

- Panchayat town
- Location in Tamil Nadu, India
- Coordinates: 11.745°N 78.047°E
- Country: India
- State: Tamil Nadu
- District: Salem

Area
  - Total: 5.5 km^{2} (2.1 sq mi)

Population (2011)
  - Total: 16,279
  - Density: 3,000/km^{2} (7,700/sq mi)

Languages
  - Official: Tamil
- Time zone: UTC+5:30 (IST)

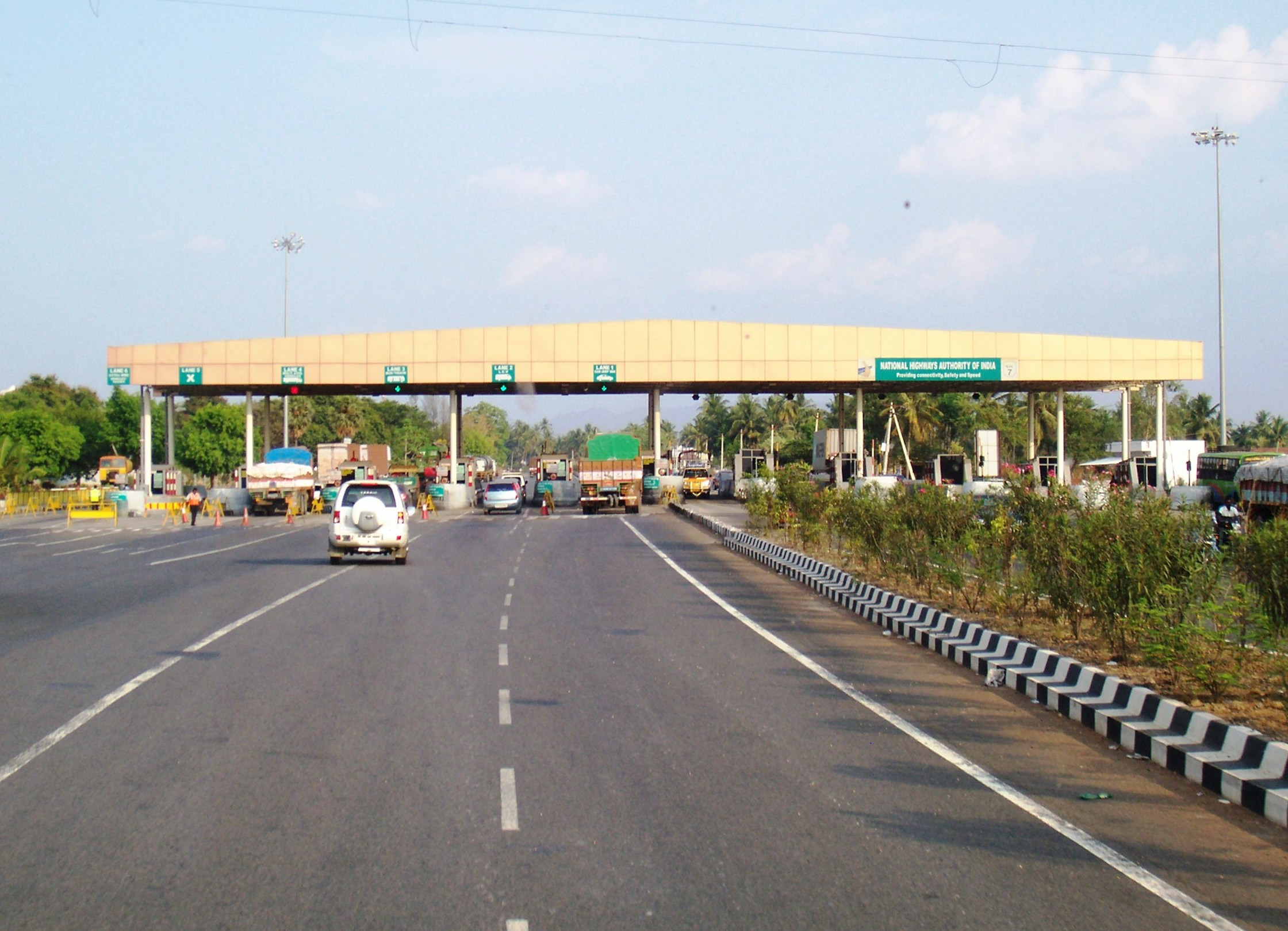
Omalur Toll Plaza

Omalur is a panchayat town in Salem district in the Indian state of Tamil Nadu. It is one of the 31 panchayat towns in the district, and the administrative seat of Omalur taluk. Spread across an area of 5.5 km^{2} (2.1 sq mi), it had a population of 16,279 individuals as per the 2011 census.

== Geography and administration ==
Omalur is located in Salem district in the Indian state of Tamil Nadu. It is the administrative seat of Omalur taluk. It is one of the 31 panchayat towns in the district. Spread across an area of 5.5 km^{2} (2.1 sq mi), it is located on the highway connecting Salem and Mettur. The region has a tropical climate with hot summers and mild winters. The highest temperatures are recorded in April and May, with lowest recordings in December-January.

The town panchayat is sub-divided into 15 wards. It is headed by a chairperson, who is elected by the members, who are chosen through direct elections. The town forms part of the Omalur Assembly constituency that elects its member to the Tamil Nadu legislative assembly and the Salem Lok Sabha constituency that elects its member to the Parliament of India.

== Demographics ==
As per the 2011 census, Omalur had a population of 16,279 individuals across 4,229 households. The population saw an increase compared to the previous census in 2001 when 13,291 inhabitants were registered. The population consisted of 8,021 males and 8,258 females. About 1,596 individuals were below the age of six years. About 12.9% of the population belonged to scheduled castes. The entire population is classified as urban. The town has an average literacy rate of 84.8%.

About 36.7% of the eligible population were employed full-time, of which majority were involved in agriculture and allied activities. Hinduism was the majority religion which was followed by 88.1% of the population, with Islam (9.7%) and Christianity (2.2%) being minor religions.

== Temples ==
Arulmigu Kottai Mariamman Temple is located in Omalur, on the banks of the Sarabanga River, which splits into two branches nearby.

Om Sri Suyambu Vel Murugan Temple is a Hindu temple dedicated to Lord Murugan, located in Thindamangalam near Omalur in Salem district, Tamil Nadu, India. The temple is a prominent local place of worship and is visited by devotees from Thindamangalam, Omalur, and surrounding areas.
