= Tharamangalam =

- Municipality
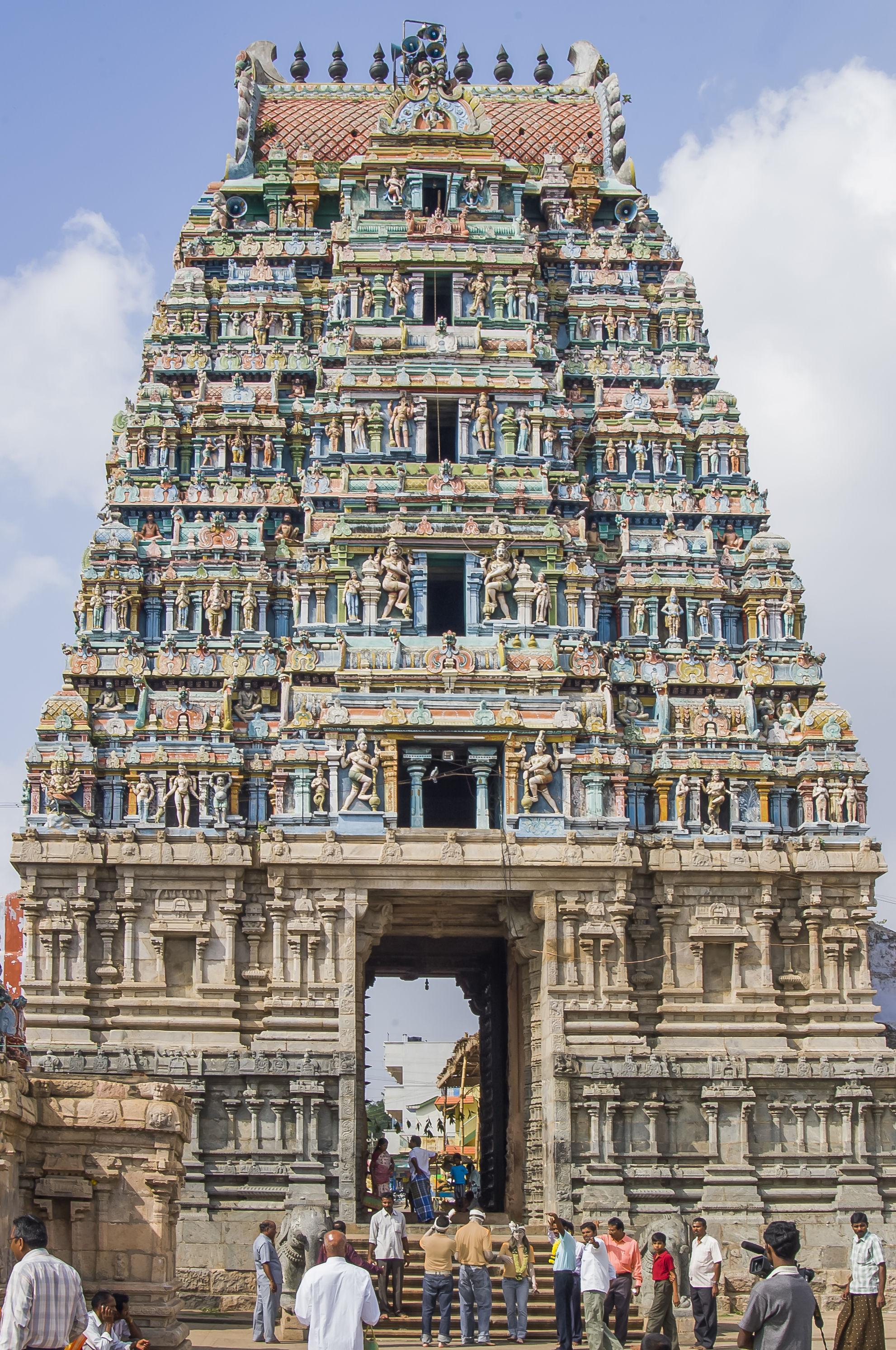
- Sri Kailasanathar Swamy Temple

- Location in Tamil Nadu, India
- Coordinates: 11.6956°N 77.9716°E
- Country: India
- State: Tamil Nadu
- District: Salem

Area
  - Total: 9.72 km^{2} (3.75 sq mi)

Population (2011)
  - Total: 30,222
  - Density: 3,110/km^{2} (8,050/sq mi)

Languages
  - Official: Tamil
- Time zone: UTC+5:30 (IST)

Tharamangalam is a Municipality in Salem district in the Indian state of Tamil Nadu. It is one of the Municipalities the district. Spread across an area of 9.72 km^{2} (3.75 sq mi), it had a population of 30,222 individuals as per the 2011 census.

== Geography and administration ==
Tharamangalam is located in Omalur taluk of Salem district in the Indian state of Tamil Nadu. It is one of the 31 panchayat towns in the district. Spread across an area of 9.72 km^{2} (3.75 sq mi), it is located 26 km (16 mi) from the district headquarters Salem. The town panchayat is sub-divided into 18 wards. It is headed by a chairperson, who is elected by the members, who are chosen through direct elections. The town forms part of the Sankari Assembly constituency that elects its member to the Tamil Nadu legislative assembly and the Salem Lok Sabha constituency that elects its member to the Parliament of India.

== Demographics ==
As per the 2011 census, Tharamangalam had a population of 30,222 individuals across 7,406 households. The population saw a marginal increase compared to the previous census in 2001 when 22,144 inhabitants were registered. The population consisted of 15,688 males and 14,534 females. About 3,072 individuals were below the age of six years. About 6.6% of the population belonged to scheduled castes. The entire population is classified as urban. The town has an average literacy rate of 70.1%.

About 47.7% of the eligible population were employed full-time, of which majority were involved in agriculture and allied activities. Hinduism was the majority religion which was followed by 99% of the population, with Christianity (0.5%) and Islam (0.5%) being minor religions.
