= Panamarathupatti block =

Panamarathupatti block is a revenue block of Salem district of the Indian state of Tamil Nadu. This revenue block consist of 20 panchayat villages. They are:

1. Amani Kondalampatti
2. Ammapalayam
3. Dasanaickenpatti
4. Ervadivaniyampadi
5. Gajjalnaickenpatti
6. Kammalapatti
7. Kuralnatham
8. Mookkuthipalayam
9. Nazhikkalpatti
10. Neikkarapatty
11. Nilavarapatti
12. Pallitherupatti
13. Parapatti
14. Peramanur
15. Santhiyur
16. Santhiyur Attayampatty
17. Thammanaickenpatty
18. Thippampatty
19. Thumbalpatti
20. Vazhakkuttapatti
