= Attur taluk =

Attur Taluk is one of the taluks, or administrative division of Salem District in the state of Tamil Nadu, India. The division's headquarters is Attur town.

== Background ==
Attur Taluk is surrounded by Gangavalli Taluk on east and Pethanaickenpalayam Taluk on the west. Recently, the railway station was rebuilt and the tracks expanded to accommodate a broad gauge. Train services run from Viruthachalam to Salem, and from Attur to Chennai.

Transportation

Attur is on NH 79. Attur is well connected with Salem on the west at 55 kilometres and Kallakkurichi on the east (north-east) at 45 kilometres on the Salem-Ulunderpet NH 79 which in turn connects to Chennai through arterial NH 45 at Ulunderpet and NH 47 (Salem-Kanyakumari via Coimbatore, Cochin, Trivandrum) at Salem with a number of bus routes.

Private buses are operated between Attur and nearby towns/villages. Tamil Nadu State run corporation, formerly known as Anna Transport Corporation (ATC), in Salem district compete with private buses in that area.

Train services run between Attur to Salem, Attur to Virudhachalam and Salem-Chennai Egmore express train runs via Attur. The frequency of operation is very low; one in each direction in the morning and one in the evening. Pondicherry-Bangalore AC express train (Puducherry Yesvantpur Garib Rath Express) runs via Attur.

Attur has many lorry transport services including Southern Roadways Ltd (TVS), ABT, ARC and other daily transporters. In Attur, the Southern Roadways branch was run by Late Mr. K.R. Ramanathan, from 1950 till 1993. He was the agent since the inception of Southern Roadways in Tamil Nadu. During his tenure, he earned a good name in Attur.

Attur is landlocked and depends on the Port of Chennai for most oceangoing freight.

Nearest airport is Salem Airport which is 55 km from the town.

== Villages ==
Villages in the vicinity include Thalavaipatti and Paithoor. Another notable village here is Gudamalai, located along the Thamampatti to Gangavalli highway. It is surrounded by hills on all four sides.

List of Cities/Villages in Attur, Gangavalli & Pethanaickenpalayam Taluk Salem District
| Sl. No | City or Village Name |
|---|---|
| 1 | PunalVasal |
| 2 | Abinavam |
| 3 | Adhiyanur |
| 4 | Akkichettipalayam |
| 5 | Ammampalayam |
| 6 | Appamasamudram |
| 7 | Aragalur |
| 8 | Arana Block |
| 9 | Arasanatham |
| 10 | Arathi Agraharam |
| 11 | Ariyapalayam |
| 12 | Attavanai Kothampady |
| 13 | Atthur |
| 14 | Azhaga Puram |
| 15 | B.Karadi Patty |
| 16 | C.K.Hills Vadakku |
| 17 | Chinna Krishnapuram |
| 18 | Chinnama Samudram |
| 19 | Ck Hills Therkku |
| 20 | Deviyakurichy |
| 21 | Echampatty |
| 22 | Edayapatty |
| 23 | Errama Samudram |
| 24 | Etthapur |
| 25 | Gopalapuram |
| 26 | Govindampalayam |
| 27 | Jadaya Koundan Sarivu_Rf |
| 28 | Jari Kothambadi |
| 29 | Kalarampatty |
| 30 | Kallanatham |
| 31 | Kalleri Patty |
| 32 | Kalpaganur |
| 33 | Kalyana Giri |
| 34 | Kamakkapalayam |
| 35 | Karia Kovil Valavu |
| 36 | Kattukottai |
| 37 | Keel Avarai |
| 38 | Keeri Patti |
| 39 | Kottavadi |
| 40 | Kumarapalayam |
| 41 | Kunoor |
| 42 | Lakshmana Samutram |
| 43 | Malaiyalapatti |
| 44 | Malliakarai |
| 45 | Manivilunthan |
| 46 | Manjini |
| 47 | Mannur |
| 48 | Mettudaiyam Palayam |
| 49 | Mettupalayam |
| 50 | Mummudi |
| 51 | Muthagoundanur |
| 52 | Muttal |
| 53 | Nadhakarai |
| 54 | Nagalur |
| 55 | Naiyamalai |
| 56 | Narasingapuram |
| 57 | Navakurichy |
| 58 | Navalur navalur pudur |
| 59 | Odda Patty |
| 60 | Olapady |
| 61 | P.K.Hills Mel Nadu |
| 62 | Paithoor |
| 63 | Paithur North (Pudur) |
| 64 | Paithur South |
| 65 | Paithur_Rf |
| 66 | Palania Puri |
| 67 | Pallipalayam |
| 68 | Panamadal |
| 69 | Pattimedu |
| 70 | Pattuthurai |
| 71 | Periya Krishna Puram |
| 72 | Periyeri |
| 73 | Petthanaickan Palayam |
| 74 | A.Karadi Patty |
| 75 | Pungavadi |
| 76 | Puthiragoundampalayam |
| 77 | Puthur |
| 78 | Ramanaickenpalayam |
| 79 | Rangappanaickanpalayam |
| 80 | Sadasivapuram |
| 81 | Sarvoy |
| 82 | Sarvoy Pudur |
| 83 | Sathapady |
| 84 | Seeliampatty |
| 85 | Sekkadi Patty |
| 86 | Siruvachur North |
| 87 | Siruvachur South |
| 88 | Sitheri |
| 89 | Sokkanathapuram |
| 90 | Soolankurichi |
| 91 | Thalaivasal |
| 92 | Thalavaipatti |
| 93 | Thalavaipatty |
| 94 | Thamayanur |
| 95 | Thandanur |
| 96 | Thandavarayapuram |
| 97 | Theerthagiri |
| 98 | Thenkumarai |
| 99 | Thennam Pillaiyur |
| 100 | Thennankudipalayam |
| 101 | Thirumalai Nama Samudram |
| 102 | Thiyaganur |
| 103 | Thulukkanur |
| 104 | Thumbal |
| 105 | Udayampatti |
| 106 | Umayalpuram |
| 107 | Unathur |
| 108 | Vadakumarai |
| 109 | Vadugathampatty |
| 110 | Vaithy Goundan Pudur |
| 111 | Valaiyamadevi |
| 112 | Varagur |
| 113 | Veeragoundanur |
| 114 | Vellapatty |
| 115 | Veppanatham |
| 116 | Vaithiyanadha puram |
| 117 | West Rajapalayam |
| 118 | Santhanagiri |
| 119 | Mulluvadi |
| 120 | Ponnolinagar |
| 121 | WEST PANANTH THOPPU |

== Location ==
Attur is a Selection Grade Municipality town and also the headquarters of Attur Taluk in Salem District. Formerly it was a town panchayat and was constituted as a Municipality with effect from 1.4.1965. It is a class II town. The extent of the Municipal area is 27.62 km^{2}. The population as per 2001 census is 57519.

Attur is a very ancient town. Attur is known as the river town. The town is situated on the southern bank of the Vasista river. It dates from 921 and was known as Milattu and Kutratthu Brahmadheyam and Malaiyaman Attur. It came to be known as Attur Ananthagiri during the Mysore rule beginning in 1689,. The name was shortened to Attur at end of the 18th Century. It was formed part of Hyder domines till 1768. Then it surrendered to Mr. Wood of East India Company. Again Hyder regained it from that company. After that company won a decisive victory in the 3rd Mysore was against Thippusultan. The fort war garrisoned in 1792 by the 23rd Madras battalion of the company under the command of captain compbell. The fort remained so until 1854 when it ceased to be military station. Attur fort is now ruined stone fort and situated on the northern bank of the Vasista River occupying an area of 62 acres.

It is constructed by a local palayakarar, C. Lakshmana Nayakan (17th Century). Until recently it was believed to have been built up the founder of the Catti Mudali Dynasty who did built the Siva and Vishnu temples in the fort.

The fort walls (about 30 feet height and 15 feet wide at the top) were reverted by wedge shaped cut-stones fitted without mortar. The stones for the walls were reportedly quarried from the hillock, Kalladithankundru (quarry hill). The fort was guarded by the river and east and by moats on other side. The large valuated chamber inside the fort is believed to have been audience hall during the Gatt regime. The spacious and well ventilated pool-house, built the pleasure of the royal family, obtained its water from the river through an ingeniously constructed and strongly defended water gate.

== Demographics ==
According to the 2011 census, the taluk of Attur had a population of 429,296 with 215,626 males and 213,670 females. There were 991 women for every 1000 men. The taluk had a literacy rate of 66.15. Child population in the age group below 6 was 21,751 Males and 19,571 Females.

== Economic Base ==
The economy of the town also depends on agriculture and allied activities. Attur is the main exporting center next to Trichengode for Betel leaves to North Indian cities besides Tamil Nadu Towns. There are more than fifteen betel mandies located within the Attur Town in addition to twenty more finding place around the town. About 12 hectares. of agricultural land is under betel leaves cultivation within the town.

=== Industries ===
Tamil Nadu Mineral (Tamin) has a granite quarry in the village of Muttal, kallanatham, Paithur, valasakalpatti which produces first quality black granites. Attur Taluk also has a large number of sago factories which process tapioca roots grown in the area as well as the neighbouring taluks of Salem, Viluppuram, Trichy and Perambalur. The taluk is surrounded by many eastern gurads hills. About Municipality. A number of rice mills and sago factories are located in South side of railway line. The Industrial use occupies 62.59 Hec. i.e. 17.59% of the developed area and 2.20% of the total area of the town respectively.

=== Strategies ===
From the above table it is observed that the employment in secondary sector in the areas of Agro basis Industries, Trade and commerce and Transportation. These activities will continue to dominate in future decades also. In addition to the above manufacturing industries and other services are the next important activities. The primary activity mainly depend upon the cultivation of wet lands.

=== Land Use and Growth Management ===
Local Planning Area Rapid industrialisation of Attur has attracted extensive changes in the development process. The migration of rural population to the town.. In order to ensure a planned growth of the town and its surroundings, the Government of Tamil Nadu has declared Attur Local Planning Area comprising three village Panchayats and three town Panchayats of the limit, in the year 2001. The area constituted 27.62 km^{2}

The Attur town extents over an area of 27.62 km^{2}. as per the approved Master Plan. Of this the developed area is 355.78 Hects. and works out to 12.48% of the total area. The remaining 87.52% constitutes undeveloped area, comprising lands such as land under water, agriculture and vacant lands. Cauveri River and Muttal Eri are the main Source for drinking water.
