= Attur, Salem =

Attur Aathur
- Town
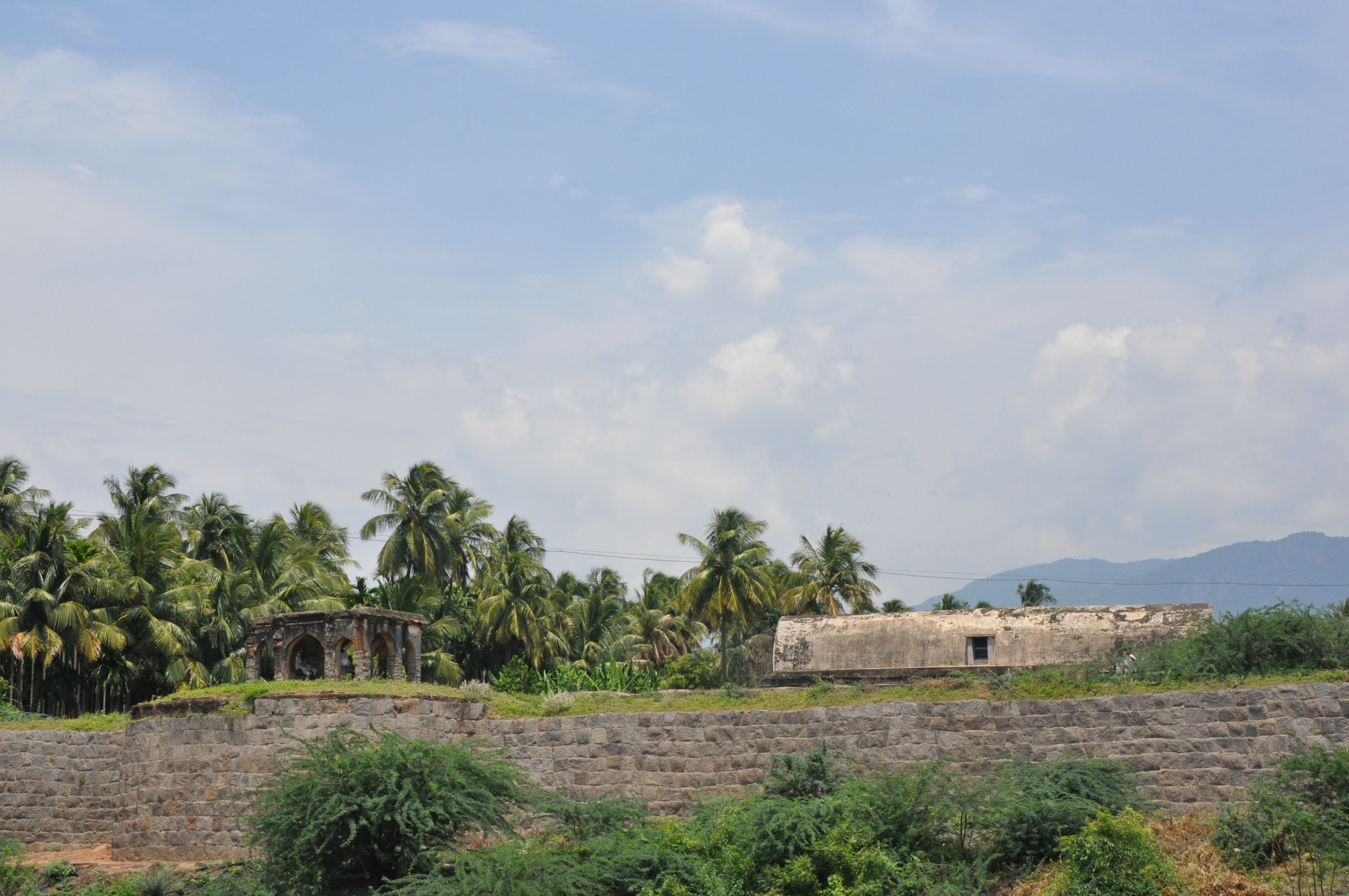
- Attur Fort
- Nickname: Sago City of India
- Interactive map of Attur
- Coordinates: 11.598300°N 78.597400°E
- Country: India
- State: Tamil Nadu
- District: Salem

Government
  - Type: Selection Grade Municipality
  - Body: Attur Municipality
- Elevation: 244 m (801 ft)

Population (2011)
  - Total: 61,793
- Demonym: Atturkaran

Languages
  - Official: Tamil
- Time zone: UTC+5:30 (IST)
- PIN: 636 102
- Telephone code: 04282
- Vehicle registration: TN-77, TN-54 X, Y, Z
- Website: www.salem.tn.nic.in/aprofile.htm

Attur or Aathur is a municipality and headquarters of Attur taluk in the Salem district in the state of Tamil Nadu, India. As of the 2011 census, the town had a population of 61,793. Attur is growing economically.

== Transport ==
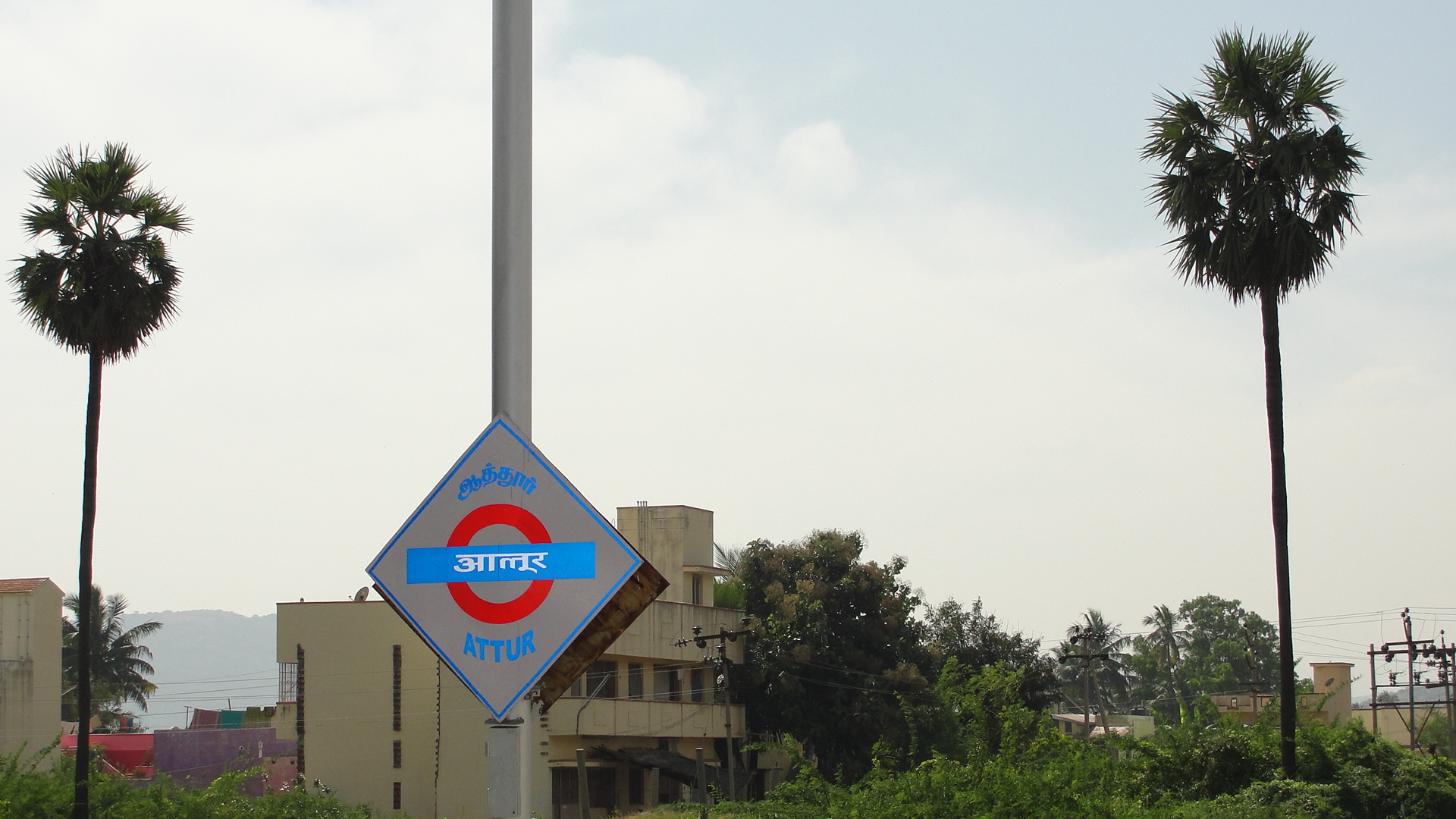
Aaththur railway station, part of the Salem- Virudhachalam branch line

Attur is located at the junction of NH 79 and NH 136. One National Highway and two state highways originate from Attur.

== Demographics ==
Religious census
Religion	Percent(%)
Hindu	90.7%
Muslim	7.24%
Christian	1.88%
Sikh	0.03%
Buddhist	0.01%
Jain	0.04%
Other	0.11%
No religion	0.0%

According to 2011 census, Attur had a population of 61,793 with a sex-ratio of 1,021 females for every 1,000 males, much above the national average of 929. A total of 6,147 were under the age of six, constituting 3,209 males and 2,938 females. Scheduled Castes and Scheduled Tribes accounted for 22.33% and 0.62% of the population respectively. The average literacy of the city was 74.65%, compared to the national average of 72.99%. The city had a total of 16,371 households. There were a total of 25,949 workers, comprising 1,417 cultivators, 3,740 main agricultural labourers, 735 in household industries, 17,482 other workers, 2,575 marginal workers, 36 marginal cultivators, 703 marginal agricultural labourers, 176 marginal workers in household industries and 1,660 other marginal workers. As per the religious census of 2011, Attur had 90.7% Hindus, 7.24% Muslims, 1.88% Christians, 0.03% Sikhs, 0.01% Buddhists, 0.04% Jains, 0.11% following other religions and 0.0% following no religion or did not indicate any religious preference.

== Politics ==
Attur assembly constituency is part of Kallakurichi (Lok Sabha constituency). Jayashankar is the current Member of Tamil Nadu Legislative Assembly (MLA) representing the Attur constituency as of 2021.
