= Yercaud =

Yercaud Erkadu
- Hill Station
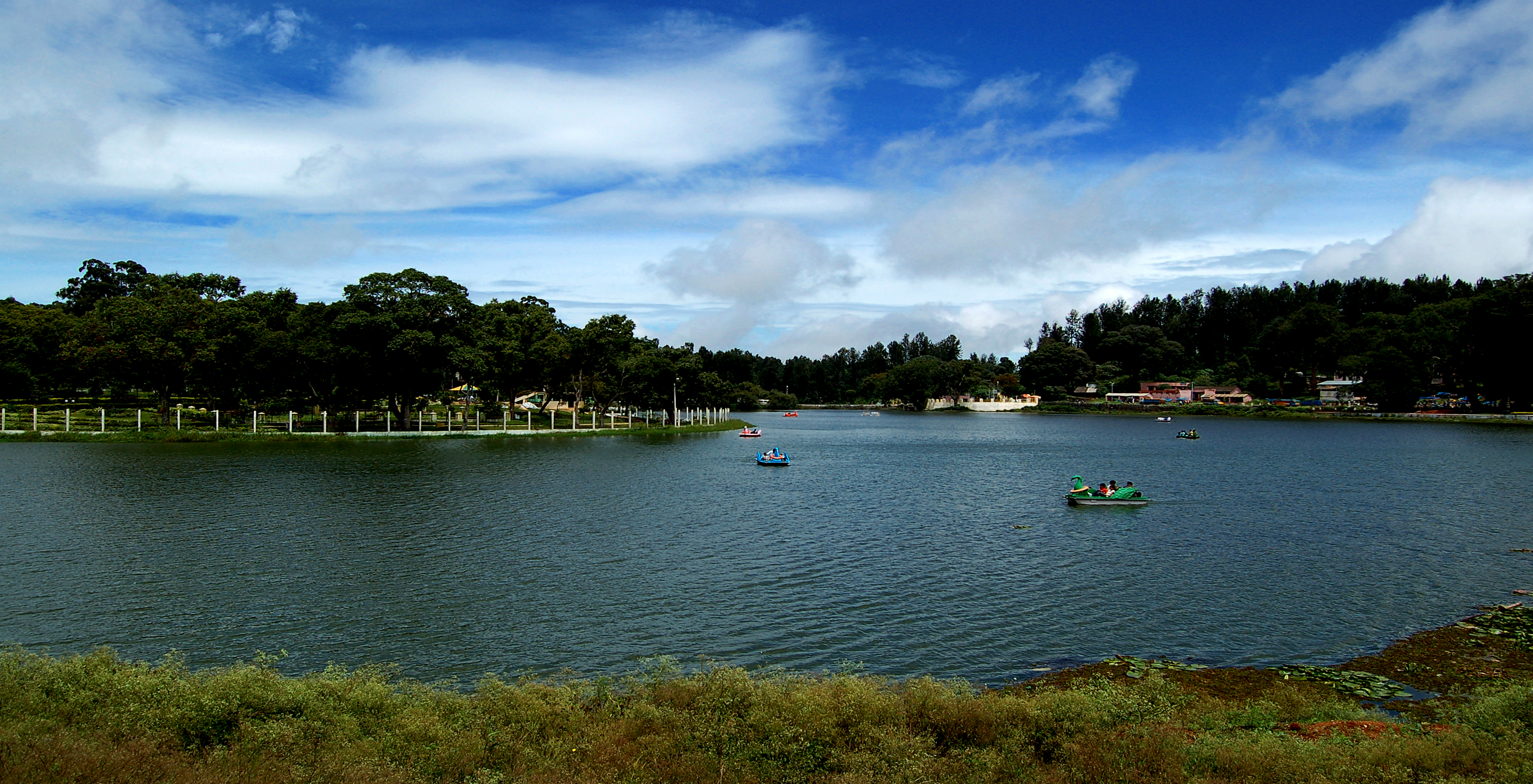
- Yercaud Lake

- Location within Salem Location within Tamil Nadu Location within India
- Coordinates: 11.7794°N 78.2034°E
- Country: India
- State: Tamil Nadu
- Region: Kongu Nadu
- District: Salem
- Elevation: 1,515 m (4,970 ft)

Population (2011)
  - Total: 11,582

Languages
  - Official: Tamil; English
- Time zone: UTC+5:30 (IST)
- Vehicle registration: TN 30, TN 54

Yercaud or Erkadu, (Note: Erkadu (Romanized: ēṟkāḍŭ) is the native Tamil name, while Yercaud is the anglicized name.) is a town and hill station in Salem District in Tamil Nadu, India. Located in Servarayan Hills in the Eastern Ghats, it is situated at an altitude of 1,515 m (4,970 ft).

== History ==
Stone-age implements have been found near an ancient shrine located in the Servarayan Hills, about 5 km from the Yercaud lake. In the 1820s, M. D. Cockburn, the collector of Salem District, facilitated the establishment of coffee plantations and citrus fruit saplings imported from South Africa. It was later discovered by Thomas Munro, the Governor of Madras Presidency in 1842 and popularized as a recreation retreat.

== Geography ==
It is located in the Shevaroy Hills in the Eastern Ghats. The total extent of Yercaud taluk is 382.67 km^{2} (147.75 sq mi) including reserve forests. It is situated at an altitude of 1,515 metres (4,970 ft) above sea level, and the highest point in Yercaud is the Servarayan Temple, at 1,628 m (5,342 ft).

=== Climate ===
Climate data for Yercaud
Month	Jan	Feb	Mar	Apr	May	Jun	Jul	Aug	Sep	Oct	Nov	Dec	Year
Record high °C (°F)	29 (84)	32 (90)	34 (93)	35 (95)	34 (93)	32 (90)	31 (88)	30 (86)	30 (86)	32 (90)	31 (88)	29 (84)	32 (90)
Mean daily maximum °C (°F)	22.9 (73.2)	26.0 (78.8)	26.9 (80.4)	28.6 (83.5)	29.4 (84.9)	29.4 (84.9)	26.6 (79.9)	26.0 (78.8)	26.1 (79.0)	25.0 (77.0)	23.7 (74.7)	23.5 (74.3)	26.2 (79.1)
Mean daily minimum °C (°F)	12.4 (54.3)	13.3 (55.9)	15.4 (59.7)	17.7 (63.9)	18.1 (64.6)	18.6 (65.5)	17.6 (63.7)	17.3 (63.1)	17.0 (62.6)	16.4 (61.5)	14.9 (58.8)	13.1 (55.6)	16.0 (60.8)
Record low °C (°F)	4 (39)	5 (41)	6 (43)	9 (48)	10 (50)	8 (46)	9 (48)	8 (46)	5 (41)	4 (39)	6 (43)	6 (43)	4 (39)
Average precipitation mm (inches)	17 (0.7)	17 (0.7)	18 (0.7)	81 (3.2)	143 (5.6)	109 (4.3)	187 (7.4)	247 (9.7)	209 (8.2)	250 (9.8)	161 (6.3)	73 (2.9)	1,512 (59.5)
Source: Wunderground

== Demographics ==
As per the 2011 census, Yercaud has a population of 11,582. The sex ratio was 974 against the state average of 996. Literacy rate was 83.17%, higher than the state average of 80.09%. Scheduled caste constituted 33.33% while Scheduled tribes were 15.50% of the total population. The town had 2,652 houses.

== Administration and politics ==
The taluk is administered as a township with a Panchayat Union headquartered at Yercaud. Yercaud is part of the Yercaud Assembly constituency which forms part of the Kallakurichi (Lok Sabha constituency).

== Economy ==
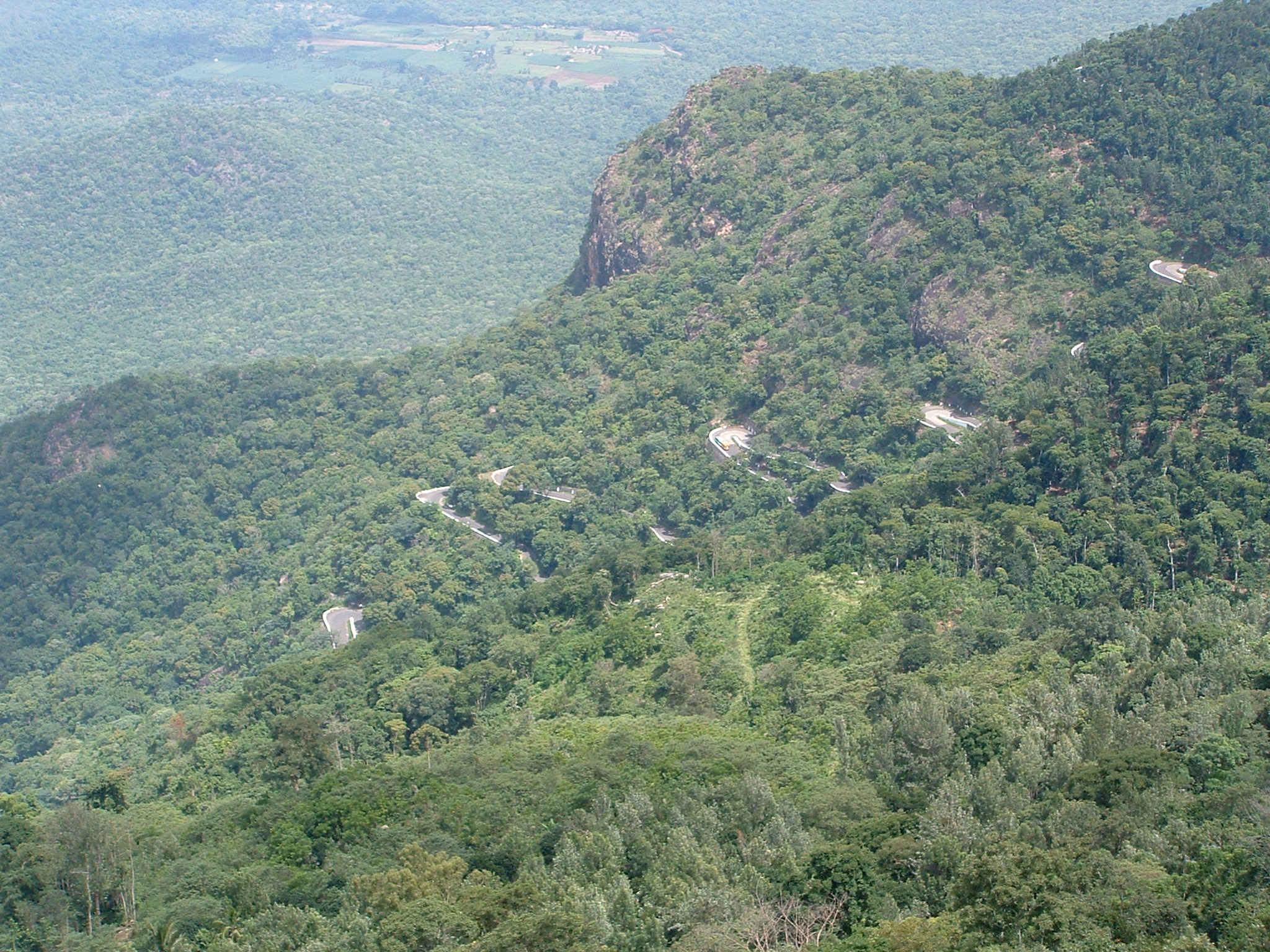
View of the Shevaroy Hills from Yercaud

The economy of Yercaud is majorly dependent on tourism and agriculture. Coffee, orange, jackfruit, guava, black pepper and cardamom are grown around the region. Yercaud Lake is a natural lake in the center of the town where there are boating facilities. Other places of interest include the deer park, bears cave, Kiliyur falls, rose garden, various view points and temples including Servarayan Temple, Raja Rajeswari Temple and Rama Temple at Pagoda Point.

== Transport ==
The nearest airport is Salem Airport at a distance of 38 km (24 mi), which has limited domestic flights. The nearest major airport is Coimbatore International Airport located 170 km (110 mi) away. The nearest railway station is Salem Junction at 34.5 km. Government owned TNSTC operates public buses from Yercaud to Salem, which is connected to other major towns.

== Education ==
There are many residential schools in Yercaud including the Monfort School, established in 1917. Shevaroys College is the only institute of higher education in the region.
