= Salem taluk =

Salem taluk is a taluk of Salem district of the Indian state of Tamil Nadu. The headquarters of the taluk is the town of Salem.

== Demographics ==
According to the 2011 census, the taluk of Salem had a population of 1,274,432, with 645,797 males and 628,635 females. There were 973 women for every 1000 men. The taluk had a literacy rate of 72.67%. Children under 6 totalled 59,730 males and 56,437 females.
