= Omalur taluk =

Coordinates: 11°45′10″N 78°00′41″E

Omalur taluk is a taluk of Salem district of the Indian state of Tamil Nadu. The headquarters of the taluk is the town of Omalur.

== Demographics ==
According to the 2011 census, the taluk of Omalur had a population of 494,861 with 259,550 males and 235,311 females. There were 907 women for every 1000 men. The taluk had a literacy rate of 60.1%. Child population in the age group below 6 was 25,502 Males and 23,203 Females.
