= Gangavalli taluk =

Gangavalli taluk is a taluk of Salem district of the Tamil Nadu state of India. The headquarters of the taluk is the town of Gangavalli.

== Demographics ==
According to the 2011 census, the taluk had a population of 161,185 with 80,634 males and 80,551 females. There were 999 women for every 1000 men. The taluk had a literacy rate of 65.4. Child population in the age group below 6 was 8,163 Males and 7,302 Females.
