= Salem district =

- District of Tamil Nadu
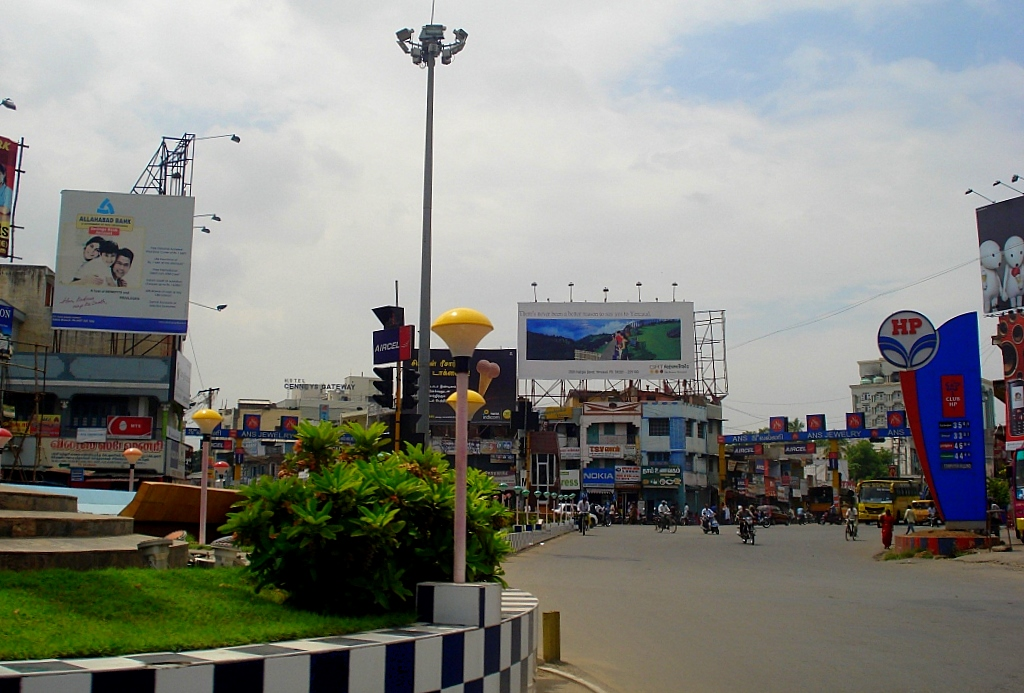
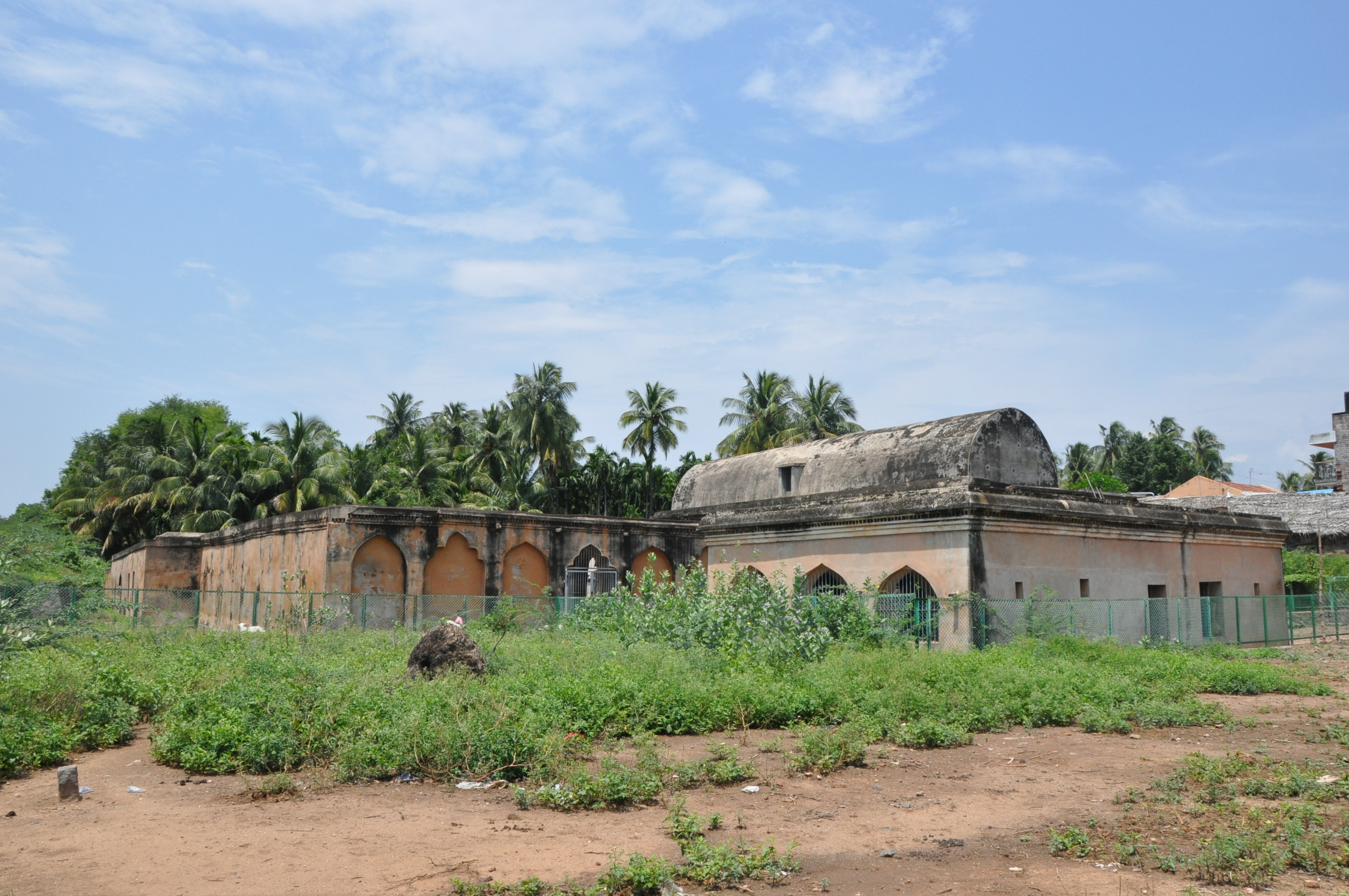
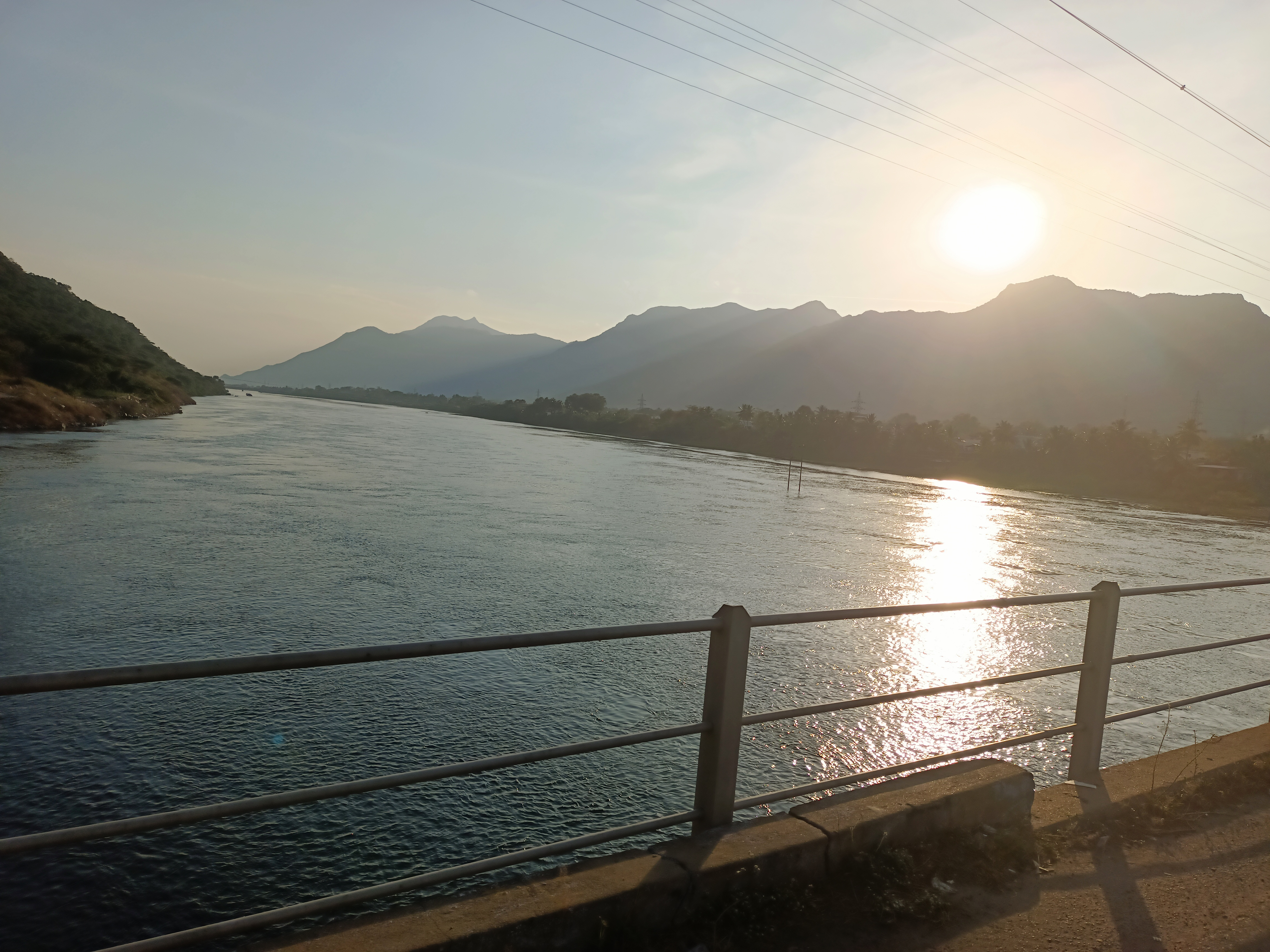
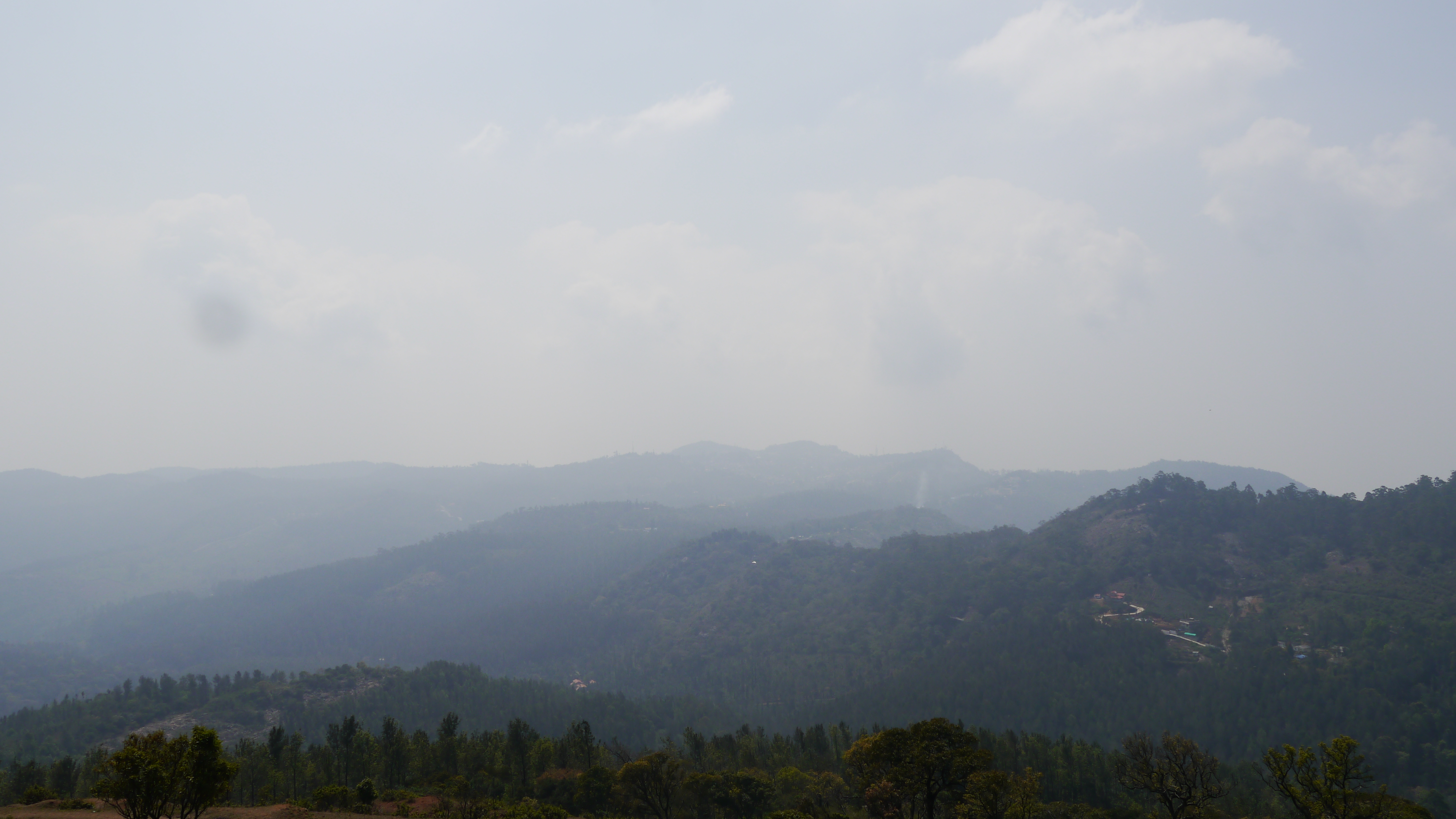
- Clockwise from top-left: Five Roads Junction in Salem, Attur Fort, Mettur Dam, View of Shevaroy Hills near Yercaud, Kottai Mariamma Temple
- Nicknames: Steel City, Mango City
- Location in Tamil Nadu
- Salem district
- Coordinates: 11°39′52.56″N 78°8′45.6″E
- Country: India
- State: Tamil Nadu
- Municipal Corporation: Salem City Municipal Corporation
- Largest city: Salem
- Municipalities: Attur; Mettur; Edappadi; Narasingapuram; Tharamangalam; Edaganasalai; Sangagiri
- Headquarters: Salem
- Taluks: Attur, Gangavalli, Idappadi, Kadayampatti, Mettur, Omalur, Pethanaicken palayam taluk, Salem, Salem South, Salem West, Sangagiri, Vazhapadi, Yercaud, Thalaivasal

Government
  - Type: District
  - Body: Salem District Collectorate
  - District Collector: Dr. R. Brindha Devi, IAS
  - Superintendent of Police: Sh. GAUTAM GOYAL, IPS

Area
  - Total: 5,245 km^{2} (2,025 sq mi)

Population (2011)
  - Total: 3,482,056
  - Density: 663.9/km^{2} (1,719/sq mi)

Languages
  - Official: Tamil
- Time zone: UTC+5:30 (IST)
- PIN: 636xxx
- Telephone code: 0427
- ISO 3166 code: [[ISO 3166-2:IN|]]
- Vehicle registration: TN-27, TN-30, TN-52, TN-54, TN-77, TN-90, TN-93
- Central location: 11°39′N 78°8′E
- Website: salem.nic.in

Salem district is one of the 38 districts of Tamil Nadu state in southern India. The district is now divided into Dharmapuri, Krishnagiri, Namakkal as individual districts. Salem is the district headquarters and other major towns in the district include Mettur, Tharamangalam, Thammampatti, Attur, Omalur, Sangagiri and Edappadi. That Salem dates to at least two thousand years ago is evident from the discovery of silver coins from the Roman Emperor Nero (37–68 CE) found by Koneripatti of Salem in 1987. It was ruled by Mazhavar King Kolli Mazhavan and kings Adhiyaman and Valvil Ori of Sangam age. It is part of Mazhanadu, a vast region that dates to the second century BCE. Salem was the largest district of Tamil Nadu. It was bifurcated into Salem and Dharmapuri districts in 1965 and Namakkal district in 1997. Now Salem has been developed a lot by building many bridges and is considered to be the Smart city. Salem is famous for cultivating mangoes.

== Geography ==
Salem districts covers an area of 5245 sq. km. It is bounded by the districts of Namakkal, Dharmapuri, Erode, and Kallakurichi. The name Salem is thought to be derived from Sailam (hills) on account of being surrounded by hills.

== Politics ==
District	No.	Constituency	Name	Party	Alliance	Remarks
Salem	81	Gangavalli (SC)	A. Nallathambi	AIADMK	NDA	Opposed TVK
Salem	82	Attur (SC)	A. P. Jayasankaran	AIADMK	NDA	Opposed TVK
Salem	83	Yercaud (ST)	P. Usharani	AIADMK	NDA	Opposed TVK
Salem	84	Omalur	R. Mani	AIADMK	NDA	Opposed TVK
Salem	85	Mettur	G. Venkatachalam	AIADMK	NDA	Opposed TVK
Salem	86	Edappadi	Edappadi K. Palaniswami	AIADMK	NDA	Opposed TVK
Salem	87	Sankari	S. Vetrivel	AIADMK	NDA	Opposed TVK
Salem	88	Salem West	S. Lakshmanan	TVK	TVK+	
Salem	89	Salem North	K. Sivakumar	TVK	TVK+	
Salem	90	Salem South	Vijay Tamilan Parthiban	TVK	TVK+	Cabinet Minister
Salem	91	Veerapandi	M. S. Palanivel	TVK	TVK+	

== Administration ==
There are 4 revenue divisions, 14 taluks, 20 revenue blocks, 1 municipal corporation, 7 municipalities, and 33 town panchayats in Salem district.

=== Revenue Divisions and Taluks ===
Salem Revenue Division: Salem taluk, Salem South taluk, Salem West taluk, Yercaud taluk, Vazhapadi taluk

Attur Revenue Division: Attur taluk, Gangavalli taluk, Peddanayakkanpalayam taluk, Thalaivasal taluk

Mettur Revenue Division: Mettur taluk, Omalur taluk, Kadayampatti taluk

Sangagiri Revenue Division: Sangagiri taluk, Edappadi

=== Revenue blocks ===
- Salem
- Veerapandi
- Thalaivasal
- Gangavalli
- Panaimarathupatti
- Ayothiapattinam
- Valapady
- Yercaud
- Attur
- Pethanaickenpalayam
- Nangavalli
- Mecheri
- Kolathur
- Omalur
- Tharamangalam
- Kadayampatti
- Sangagiri
- Magudanchavadi
- Konganapuram
- Edappadi

=== Municipal corporation ===
- Salem City Municipal Corporation

=== Municipalities ===
- Attur
- Mettur
- Edappadi
- Narasingapuram
- Edaganasalai
- Tharamangalam
- Sangagiri

=== Town Panchayats ===
- Arasiramani
- Ayothiapattinam
- Attayampatti
- Belur (Thiruvelviyur(a) Belur)
- Elampillai
- Ethapur (Yethapur)
- Gangavalli
- Jalakandapuram
- Kadayampatti
- Kannankurichi
- Karuppur
- Keeripatti
- Kolathur
- Konganapuram
- Mallur
- Mecheri
- Nangavalli
- Omalur
- P. N. Patti
- Panaimarathupatti
- Pethanaickenpalayam
- Poolampatti
- Sentharapatti
- Thalaivasal
- Thammampatti
- Thedavur
- Thevur
- Vanavasi
- Vazhapadi
- Veeraganur
- Veerakkalpudur
- Yercaud
- Manivilundhan

== Demographics ==
Historical population
Year	Pop.	±% p.a.
1901	793,641	—
1911	821,494	+0.35%
1921	886,630	+0.77%
1931	998,086	+1.19%
1941	1,189,060	+1.77%
1951	1,430,876	+1.87%
1961	1,605,327	+1.16%
1971	1,996,187	+2.20%
1981	2,268,981	+1.29%
1991	2,573,667	+1.27%
2001	3,016,346	+1.60%
2011	3,482,056	+1.45%

Religions in Salem district (2011)
Religion	Percent
Hinduism	95.53%
Islam	2.74%
Christianity	1.55%
Other or not stated	0.18%

According to 2011 census, Salem district had a population of 3,482,056 with a sex-ratio of 954 females for every 1,000 males, much above the national average of 929. A total of 344,960 were under the age of six, constituting 180,002 males and 164,958 females. 50.95% of the population lived in urban areas. Scheduled Castes and Scheduled Tribes accounted for 16.67% and 3.43% of the population respectively. The average literacy of the district was 72.86%, compared to the national average of 72.99%. The district had a total of 915,967 households. There were a total of 1,694,160 workers, comprising 247,011 cultivators, 396,158 main agricultural labourers, 132,700 in household industries, 785,161 other workers, 133,130 marginal workers, 9,993 marginal cultivators, 58,052 marginal agricultural labourers, 8,803 marginal workers in household industries and 56,282 other marginal workers.

Languages of Salem district (2011)
1. Tamil (88.5%)
2. Telugu (6.08%)
3. Kannada (2.48%)
4. Urdu (1.58%)
5. Others (1.38%)

At the time of the 2011 census, 88.48% of the population spoke Tamil, 6.08% Telugu, 2.48% Kannada and 1.58% Urdu as their first language. Other significant languages spoken here include Saurashtra.

== Education ==
Salem district is home to the Periyar University and the Vinayaka Mission University. The district has many educational institutions including Government Arts College (autonomous), Government Arts College for Women, Government College of Engineering (autonomous), Sona College of Technology (Autonomous), Thiagarajar Polytechnic College (Autonomous), Indian Institute of Handloom Technology, Government Polytechnic College, Central Law College, Sarada Institutions, and Mohan Kumaramangalam College (Medical), Salem Film school, Salem. Schools include Sri Chaitanya Techno School, Holy Cross, Glazebrooke, Holy Angels', St. Johns, Cluny, Golden Gates, Emerald Valley, Senthil Public School, Vidya Mandir, Little Flower, CSI Higher Secondary School and St. Joseph Schools.

== Law enforcement ==
Law and order is maintained by the Salem district Tamil Nadu Police, headed by a Superintendent of Police. Sh. Gautam Goyal, IPS is the current Superintendent of Police. Special units include prohibition enforcement, district crime, social justice and human rights, district crime records and a district-level special branch.

Salem district is in charge of the central prison at Hastampatti. It's one of the oldest jails and is able to host upto 1431 house prisoners.

== Industries ==
The Salem handloom industry is one of the most ancient cottage industries and producing quality sari, dothi and angavasthram out of silk yarn and cotton yarn. In the recent past, home furnishing items are also woven, mainly for export purposes. More than 75,000 handlooms are working and the total value of cloth produced per annum is estimated at ₹ 500,000 million. With more than 125 spinning mills, with modern weaving units and garment units Salem established itself as one of the major textile center in Tamil Nadu. The history of handloom and spinning mills dates back to pre-independence period in Salem. But until 1960s there were fewer than 5 spinning mills. Private handloom weaving started thriving in the region along with the large scale cooperative sector handloom weaving and marketing units. Small scale hand dying units were started around the region to the industry. Around 1980s the textile industry grew significantly. Many major spinning mills and waste spinning units came up into existence. Many Handloom societies and dying houses were established. New and increased number of Power Loom units were mushroomed in the places like Gugai, Ammapet, Attayampatti, Mallasamudram, Vennanthur, Magudanchavadi, Rasipuram, Komarapalayam, Pallipalayam, Jalakandapuram and Elampillai.

The Salem region also houses the Tamil Nadu largest number of Sago industries which are engaged in the production Sago Foods and Starch. In Salem District alone, 34000 hectares of land is under tapioca cultivation which is the raw material for the sago industries and there are 650 units engaged in tapioca processing. In and around Salem the yield of tapioca is about 25-30 T/ha, highest in the World. National average is 19 T/ha and World average production stands at 10 T/ha. Hence it is called land of sago. In 1981, Salem Starch and Sago Manufacturers Service Industrial Co-operative Society Ltd (popularly called as SAGOSERVE) was established to promote the growth of sago industries. Nearly 80% of the national demand for Sago and Starch is being met by the Sagoserv.

Salem Steel Plant, a special steel unit of Steel Authority of India Ltd have their plant located in Salem which produces Cold rolled stainless steel and Hot rolled stainless steel/carbon steel. The plant can produce Austenitic, ferritic, Martensite and low-nickel stainless steel in the form of coils and sheets with an installed capacity of 70,000 tonnes/year in Cold Rolling Mill and 1,86,000 tonnes/year in Hot Rolling Mill. In addition, the plant has country's first top-of-the-line stainless steel blanking facility with a capacity of 3,600 tonnes/year of coin blanks and utility blanks/circles. Expansion and modernisation of Salem Steel Plant is ongoing. The plan envisages installation of Steel Melting and Continuous Casting facilities to produce 1,80,000 tonnes of slabs along with expansion of Cold Rolling Mill complex, enhancing the capacity of Cold Rolled Stainless Steel Products from 65,000 TPA to 146,000 TPA and an additional Roll Grinding Machine for Hot Rolling Mill for increasing production to 3,64,000 TPA. The total project area is 1130 acres and cost of the project is ₹ 17,800 million.

Southern Iron & Steel Company Ltd (joint venture with JSW Steel) the first integrated steel plant of India at a cost of ₹ 22,350 million, located near Salem for the production of TMT corrosion resistant bars/alloy steels. The Salem plant is the largest special steel plant in India aims to develop the Kanjamalai, Kavuthimalai and Vediappanmalai iron ore mines in Tamil Nadu on receipt of requisite approvals to improve raw material security. This will facilitate expansion of production capacity to 2 MTPA. It will also allow the unit to diversify into the production of value-added products such as annealed, drawn and peeled steel. The plant is continuously working to develop special grades for critical automotive applications.

The Madras Aluminium Company Ltd (MALCO) is part of Vedanta Resources Plc, a London Stock Exchange listed FTSE 100 diversified metals and mining major. MALCO has a state-of-the-art, coal-based Captive Power Plant at the same location which was commissioned in the year 1999. In the year 2004 MALCO augmented its smelter capacity from earlier 25,000 TPA to 40,000 TPA. It generates 100 MW power from 4 units of 25MW each through power plant located at Mettur, Tamil Nadu. Around 90% of the entire power generated is exported; the rest is used internally. Efficient plant operations enabled MALCO to achieve a higher plant load factor since existence.

The region around Salem is rich in mineral ores. Salem has one of the largest Magnesite, Bauxite and also Iron ore deposits in India. It has many magnesite factories operated by private and public sectors such as Burn Standard & Co, Dalmia Magnesites and Tata Refractories, SAIL refractories. The Leigh Bazaar market in Salem is the biggest regional market for agro products. Narasus coffee one of the famous coffee in Tamil Nadu, Nandhi Dall Mills the oldest flour mill company, BSP refineries (Usha Refined Sunflower Oil) are other few companies have their presence in Salem.

Being one of the fastest growing tier II cities, the Tamil Nadu government and ELCOT are planning to establish an IT park in Salem covering about 160 acres (0.65 km^{2}). SAIL is planning a Steel SEZ inside the Salem Steel plant covering about 250 acres (1.0 km^{2}). There is an exclusive Electrical and Electronics Industrial Estate in the Suramangalam area of Salem city. Coimbatore-Erode-Salem stretch was well known for Industries and Textile processings and it is announced as Coimbatore-Salem Industrial Corridor and further development works are carried by SIPCOT Linking.

== Places of interest ==
- Attur Fort
- Dhasekar
- Kurumbapatti Zoological Park
- Mettur Dam
- Poolampatty Water Place (Salem's Kerala)
- Sangagiri Fort
- Sowriyur
- Yercaud

== See also ==
- List of districts of Tamil Nadu
