= List of schools in Salem district =

This is a list of schools in Salem district, Tamil Nadu.

== Schools ==
- Government Boys Higher Secondary School, Thiruvelviyur (a) Belur
- Government Girls Higher Secondary School, Thiruvelviyur (a) Belur
- Government boys higher secondary school, Gangavalli
- Aerokids International Preschool, Elampillai
- AGN Matriculation and Higher Secondary School, Konganapuram
- Acharya Higher Secondary school, Poolampatti Road, Edappadi
- Acharya Primary school, Poolampatti Road, Edappadi
- Acharya Pre-Primary school, Poolampatti Road, Edappadi
- Amala Matriculation and Higher Secondary School, Morasapatti
- Bala Bharathi Matriculation Higher Secondary School
- Bharathi Matriculation Higher Secondary School, Thammampatti
- Bharathi Vidya Mandir Matriculation School, Aaragalur
- Bharathi Vidyalaya Higher Secondary School, Maravaneri
- Bharat Matriculation Higher Secondary School, Vinyagapuram, Attur, Salem
- BHARAT International Schools, NH-79, P.G.Palayam, Attur, Salem
- Christopher Matriculation Higher Secondary School, Panamarathupatti(Website:http://christopherschools.org/)
- Christopher Nursery and Primary School, Dadagapatti (Website:http://christopherschools.org/)
- Classic Matriculation School - Siruvachur, Attur
- Cluny Matriculation Higher Secondary School
- C.S.I. Higher Secondary School, Shevapet
- C.S.I. Matriculation High School, Shevapet
- Chinmaya Vidyalaya Matriculation School, Sollampallam, Salem
- Diamond Rays Matriculation Higher Secondary School
- Emerald Valley Public school, Yercaud foothills, Salem
- Glaze Brooke Matriculation Higher Secondary School, Reddiyur
- Gokulanatha Hindu Mahajana Higher Secondary School
- Golden Choice Matriculation Higher Secondary School
- Golden Gates Earth School
- Golden Spark Matriculation Higher Secondary School
- Government Boys Higher Secondary School, Attur
- Government Boys Higher Secondary School, Vazhapadi
- Government Girls Higher Secondary School, veeraganur
- Government Boys Higher Secondary School, Salem, near Salem corporation building
- Government Girls Higher Secondary School, near Valluvar statue
- Greenpark Matric Higher Secondary School, Attur
- Government Boys Higher Secondary School, Mettur Dam
- Government Boys Higher Secondary School, Thammapatty
- Gugai Higher Secondary School, Line Medu
- Gugai Matriculation Higher School, Line Medu
- G.V. Higher Secondary School, Mettur Dam
- Holy Angels Matriculation Higher Secondary School
- Holy Angels' Public School, Fairlands
- Holy Cross International School
- Holy Cross Matriculation Higher Secondary School
- Holy Flower Matriculation Higher Secondary School
- Jairam Public School (CBSE), Chinnathirupathi, Salem-8
- Jay Matriculation Higher Secondary school, Ponnamapet
- Jayam Academy (CBSE) School, Samiyarkinaru, Near Attur
- Jayam Matric School, Samiyarkinaru, Near Attur
- Jayarani matriculation hr.sec school, Nethimedu
- Jothi Matriculation Higher Secondary School, Ammapet
- Kailash Maansarovar School
- Kamaraja Educational Trust Thedavoor
- The Little Flower Higher Secondary School, 4-Roads, Salem
- Little Flower Matriculation School
- Malco Vidyalaya Matriculation Higher Secondary School, Mettur Dam
- MAM Higher Secondary and Matriculation School, Mettur Dam
- Maruthi Higher Secondary School, Manivizhundan (South), Attur
- MALAR Matric Hr. Sec. School, Attur, Salem
- Montfort Higher Secondary School, Yercaud
- Municipal Boys Higher Secondary School, Ammapet
- Municipal Girls Higher Secondary School, Ammapet
- Neelambal Subramaniam Matric Hr. Sec. School, Old Suramangalam, Salem
- Notre Dame of Holy cross school
- National matric higher secondary school, Annaiyampatti
- Prapavathy Matriculation School, Karumandurai, Salem
- Raj Matriculation Higher Secondary School, P.G. Palayam, Attur
- Sabari School of Excellence, Deevattipatti
- Saraswathi Matriculation School, Ulipuram
- Saraswathi Matric Higher Secondary School, Attur
- Sengunthar Matric Higher Secondary School, Sanyasigundu, Salem.
- Shevaroy's Valley School, Vazhavandhi, Yercaud, Salem.
- SHY Higher Secondary School, Yercard
- Sindhi Hindu high school, Narayana Nagar
- Sourashtra High School
- Sri SESHAAS International Public School, Yercaud foothills, Salem-8
- Sri Ragavendra Matric Higher Secondary School. Veeraganur
- Sri SRV Matriculation Higher Secondary School
- Sri Saradha Bala Mandhir Higher Secondary School
- Sri Saradha Vidyalaya Girls Higher Secondary School
- Sri Venkateswara Matriculation and Higher Secondary School, Thalaivasal Po, Attur, Salem
- Sri Vidya Mandir Higher Secondary School [CBSE], Anandasramam, Meyyanur
- Sri Vidya Mandir Senior Secondary School [CBSE], Shivaji Nagar, Ammapet
- Sri Vidya Mandir Higher Secondary School [CBSE], Ayodhiappattanam
- Sri Vidya Mandir Secondary School [CBSE], Kondalampatty
- Sri Vidya Mandir Secondary School [CBSE], Shevapet
- Sri Vidya Mandir Higher Secondary School, Attayampatty
- Sri Vidya Mandir Anglo-Indian Matriculation Higher Secondary School, (CBSE & MATRIC), Salem Steel plant
- SRK Matriculation Higher Secondary School
- SSRM Higher Secondary School, Karupur
- St. John's Matriculation Higher Secondary School
- St. Joseph's Matriculation Higher Secondary School, Line Medu
- St. Mary's Girls Higher Secondary School
- St. Mary's Higher Secondary School, A.N.Mangalam, Karipatty (VIA)
- St. Mary's Higher Secondary School, Arisipalayam
- St. Mary's Matriculation School, Arisipalayam
- St. Mary's Matriculation School, Vellandivalasu, Edappadi
- St. Paul's Higher Secondary School, Salem.
- Tagore Matriculation Higher Secondary School, Attur
- Tippu Islamiya Matriculation School, Salem
- Universal Matriculation Higher Secondary School, Edappadi
- Vaanivikas matric Higher Secondary School, Kothambadi, Attur
- Vanavani Vidyalaya Matriculation School, Neykkarapatti, Salem
- Vaigai Matriculation Higher Secondary School, Vazhapadi
- Vasavi Higher Secondary School, Shevapet
- Vasavi Matriculation School, Shevapet
- Vedhha Vikass Matriculation and Higher Secondary School, Santhiyur
- Wisdom Matriculation Higher Secondary School, Edappadi
- Yuva Bharathi Matriculation School, Maravenari
- S.K.T Matric Higher Secondary School, Poolampatty
- Government Higher Secondary School, Mettupatty
- Velasamy Chettiar Higher Secondary School, Omalur
- Wisdom Gates Matric Higher Secondary School, Velagouanur Omalur.
