= Kurumbapatti Zoological Park =

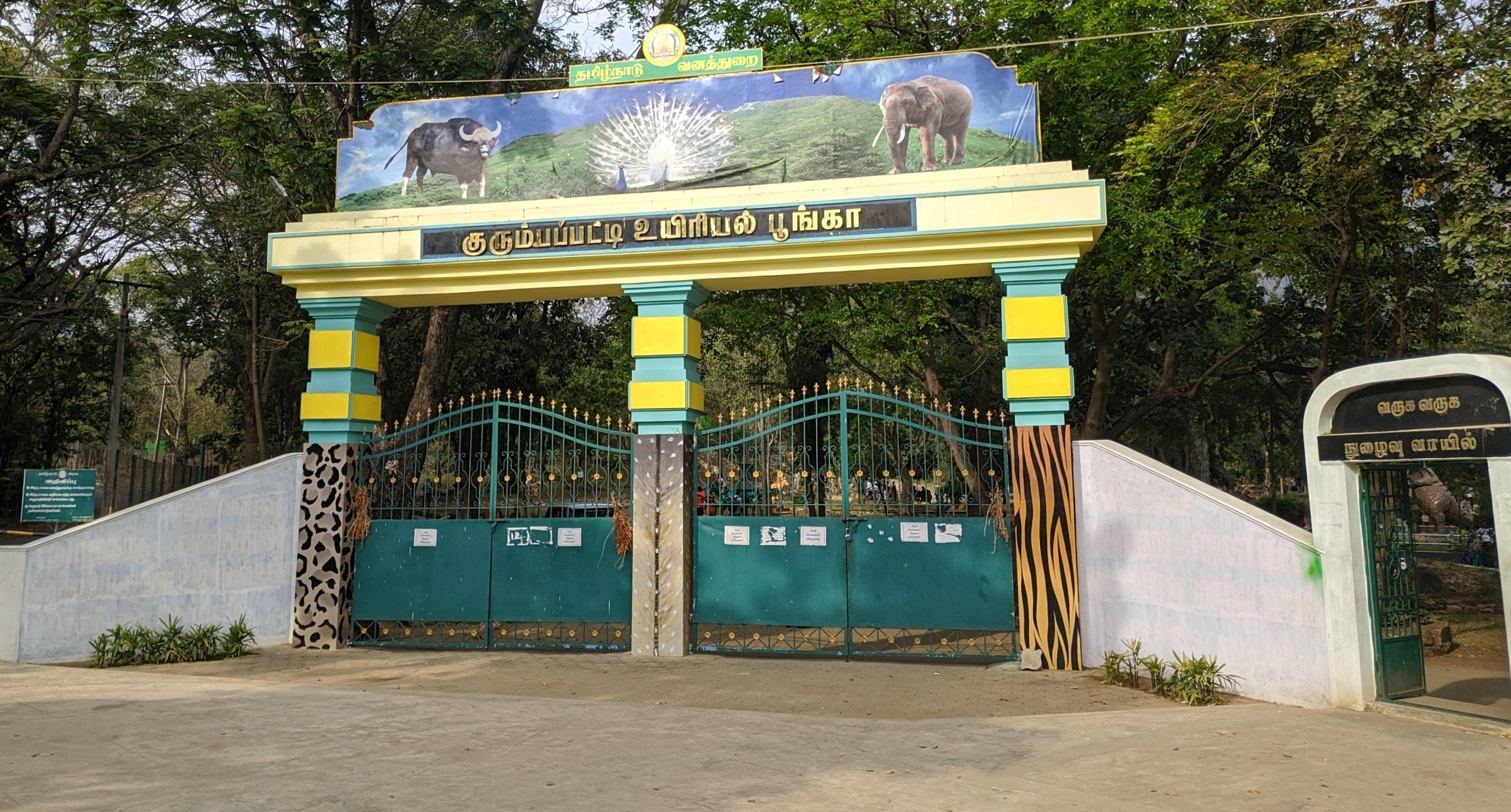
- The main entrance of the zoo
- Interactive map of Kurumbapatti Zoological Park
- 11.744153°N 78.170944°E
- Date opened: 1971
- Location: Salem, Tamil Nadu, India
- Land area: 170 acres (69 ha)
- No. of animals: 334
- No. of species: 17
- Annual visitors: 277,408
- Memberships: Chief Wild Life Warden, Tamil Nadu
- Major exhibits: Monkeys, Spotted deer, Sambar deer, star tortoise, peafowl
- Owner: Salem City Municipal Corporation
- Website: http://www.salemecotourism.com

The Kurumbapatti Zoological Park is a second largest zoo in Tamil Nadu next to Arignar Anna Zoological Park, situated in the foothills of the Shervaroyan Hills, 10 km from Salem, Tamil Nadu, India. It was set up in 1981 as a small museum and was later extended to 69 Ha. The zoo houses many species of wildlife, with monkeys as the major attraction, and is in the vicinity of reserve forest, permitting visitors the opportunity to also experience the flora and fauna there. The park has a gentle topography, areas of bamboo and woodland and semi-perennial streams. Facilities include a children's playground area.

== Exhibits ==
The park features spotted deer, sambar deer, white peacock, bonnet macaque, grey pelican, little egret, grey heron, turtle, marsh crocodile, star tortoise, plum headed parakeet, rose-ringed parakeet, a 58-year-old elephant Andal, yellow-footed green pigeon (treron phoenicoptera), blackbucks and Bison. Four Alexandrine parakeets, 20 rose-ringed parakeets and five Plum-headed parakeets have arrived from the Arignar Anna Zoological Park in Vandalur to be displayed in purpose-built enclosures. Separate enclosures exist for the parakeets to permit better viewing for visitors. The park recently received three Asian palm civets from Tiruvarur forest division and will be moved to enclosures for Visitors once Quarantine period is over

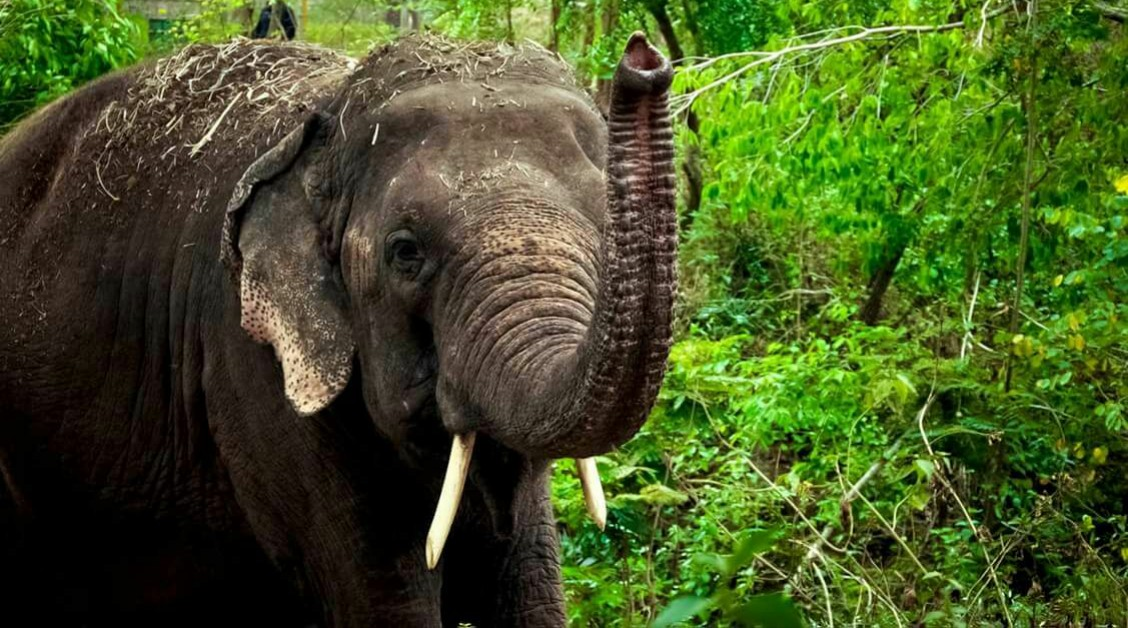
Zoo elephant Andal

Animals at the park as of 31 March 2018 include:

Group	Number of species	Number of animals
Mammals	04	34
Birds	09	109
Reptiles	04	14
Total	17	157

== 2019 Renovation ==
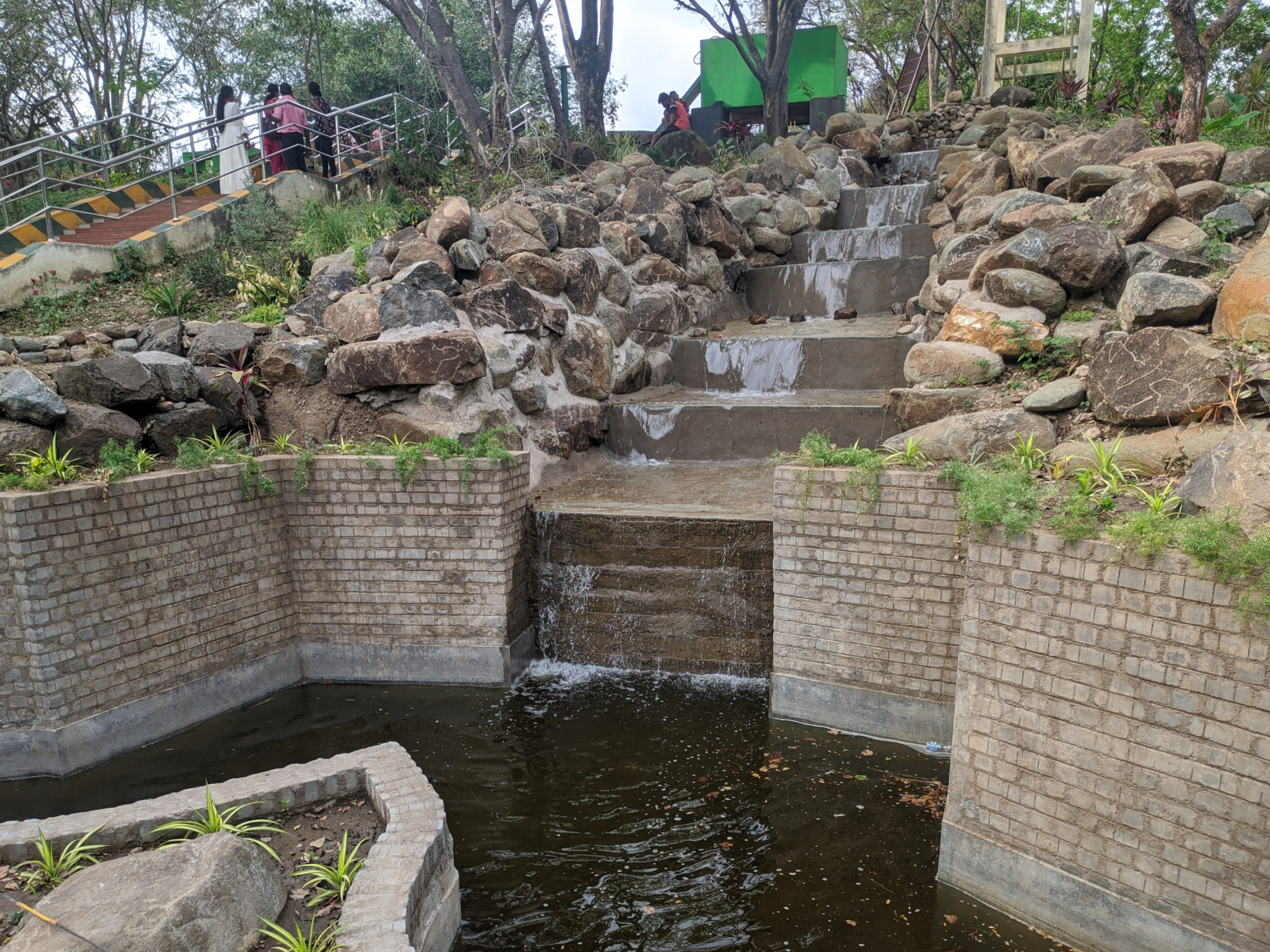
Artificial Waterfall in Zoo

In 2019 a butterfly garden was opened and 3D artworks of animals such as tigers and butterflies were created along the pathways inside the zoo. A wide range of flowering plants was incorporated into the area close to the butterfly garden, with four beehives to facilitate cross-pollination. An artificial waterfall and lawns were also planned as part of the renovation effort.

== Rescue and rehabilitation of wild animals ==
The zoo is located in Kurumbapatty reserve forests in the foothills of the Shervaroys. The city is surrounded by hillocks and reserve forests. Consequently, the zoo is involved in the rescue and rehabilitation of wild animals regularly. The injured animals are provided with veterinary care at the zoo, and other animals are quarantined and released into the wild.

== Proposed Up-gradation 2020 ==
The forest department have decided to bring in large carnivorous animals like tiger, leopard and sloth bears to the zoo and also expand the area from 31.74 hectares to 80 hectares. The Tamil Nadu government announced that the zoo will be expanded into a medium category zoo and allotted 8 crores for the purpose.

== Incidents ==
An elephant in zoo premises attacked and trambled mahout kaliappan, a 45 years old man died during this incident. The same elephant named Andal killed a forest watcher in 2013.

== Gallery ==
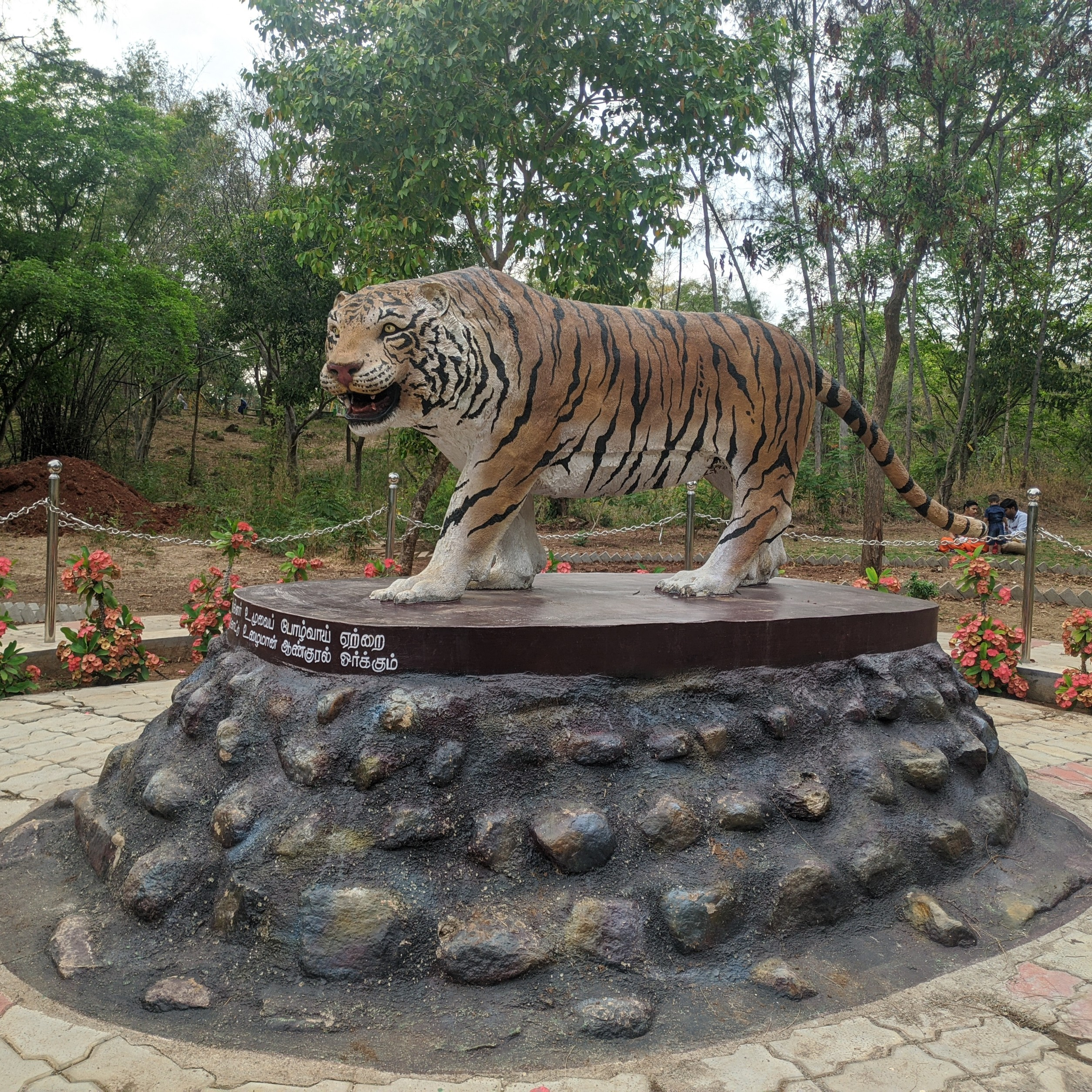
Newly added Tiger Statue.

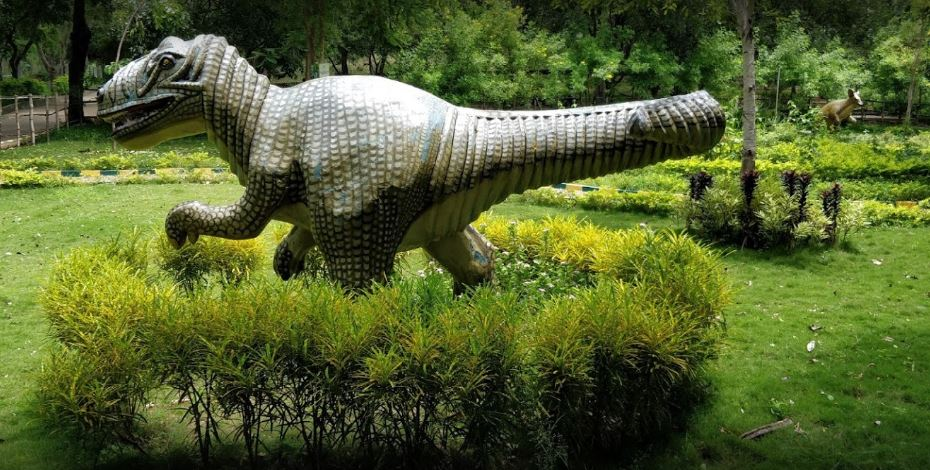
Dinosaur Statue.

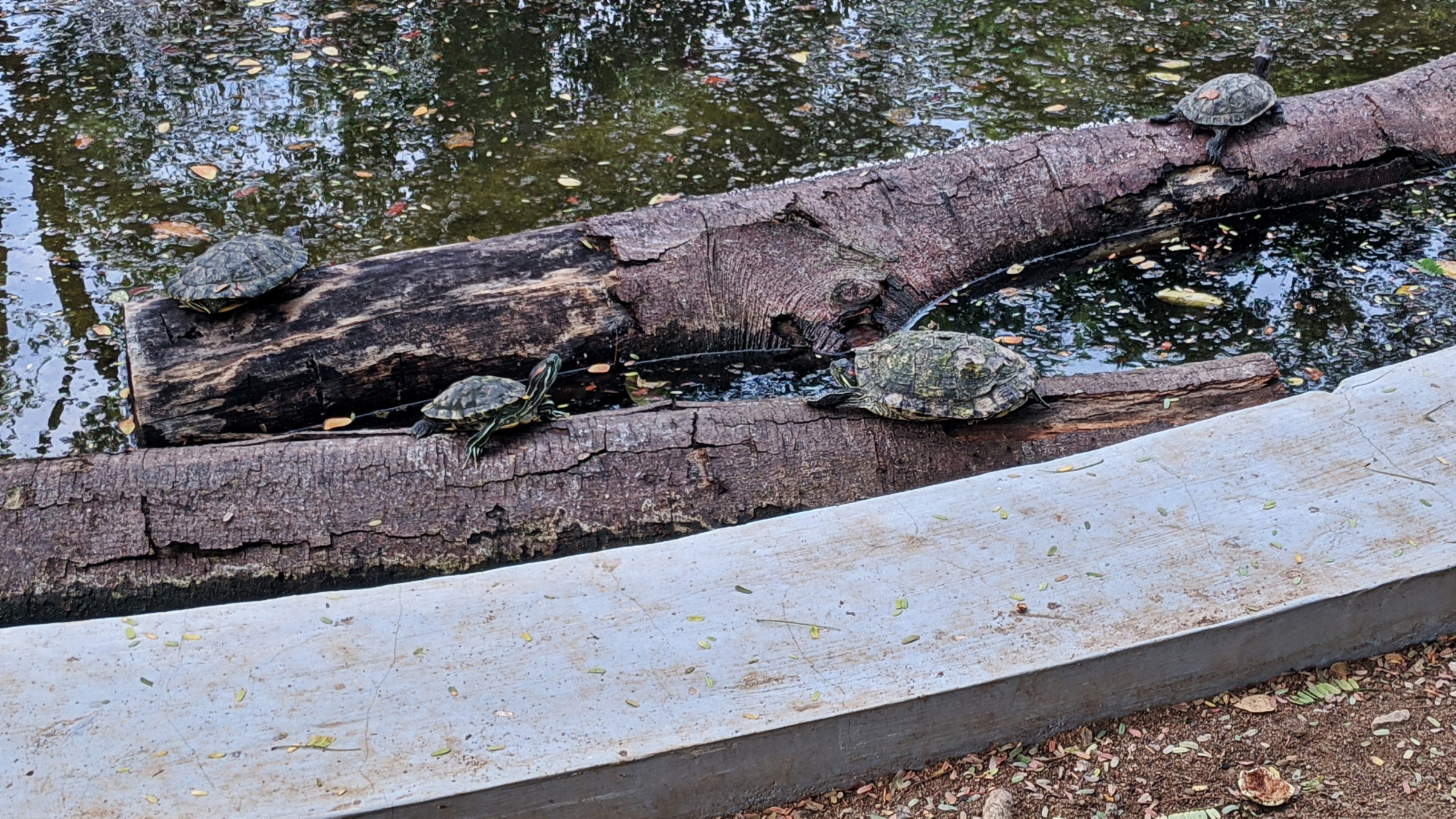
Red-Eared Slider tortoises

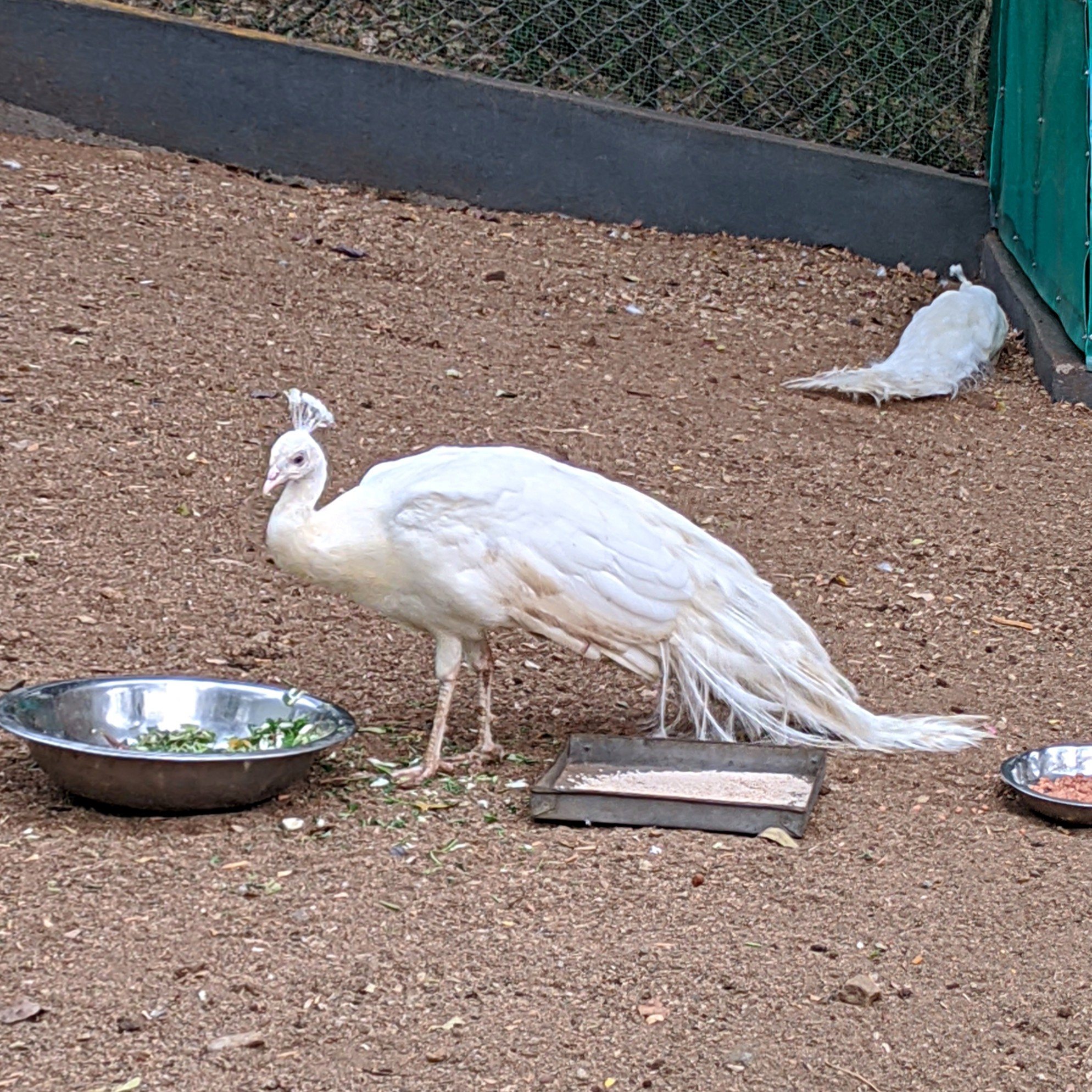
White Peacocks enclave.

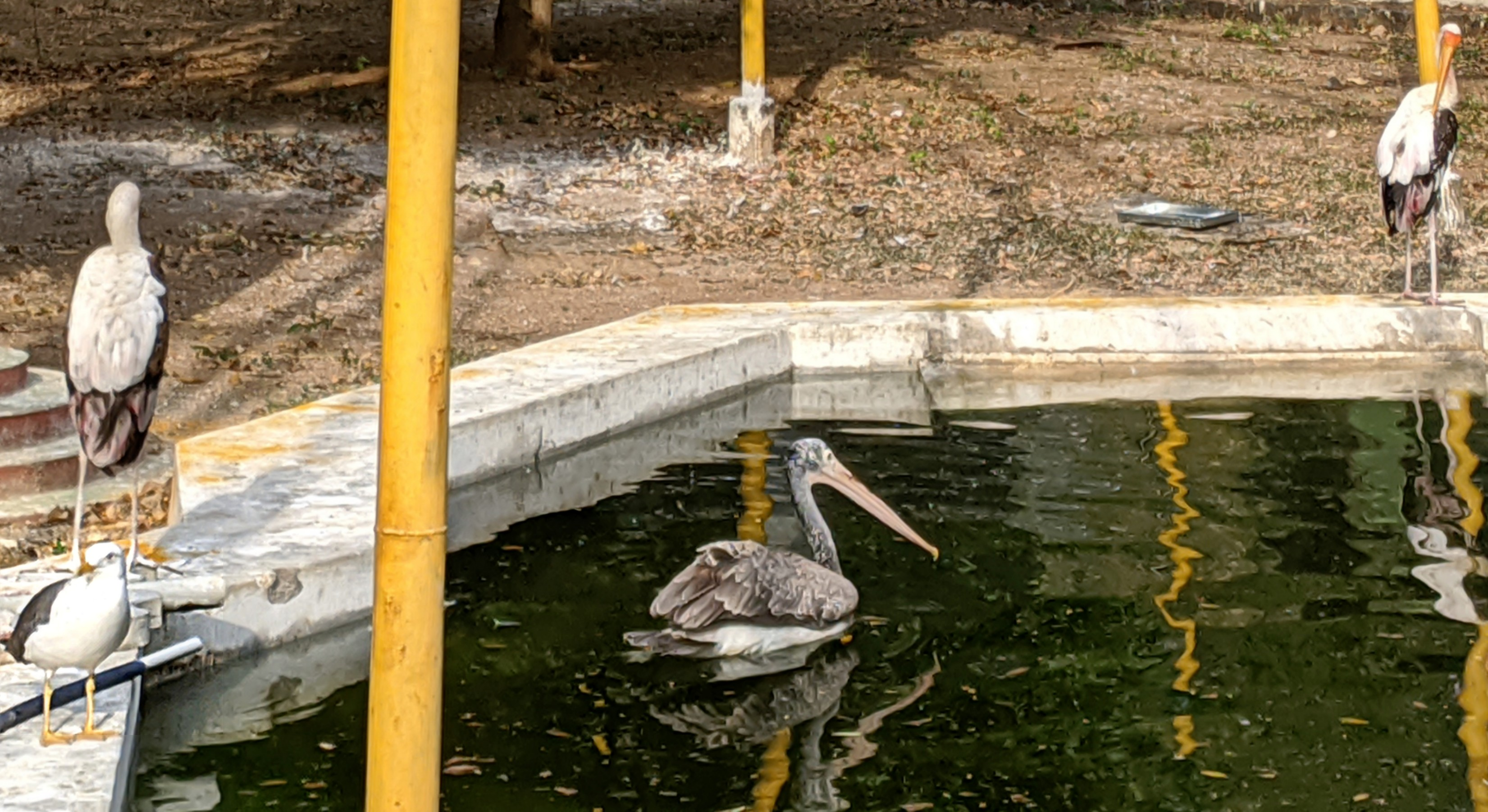
Pelican birds enclave.

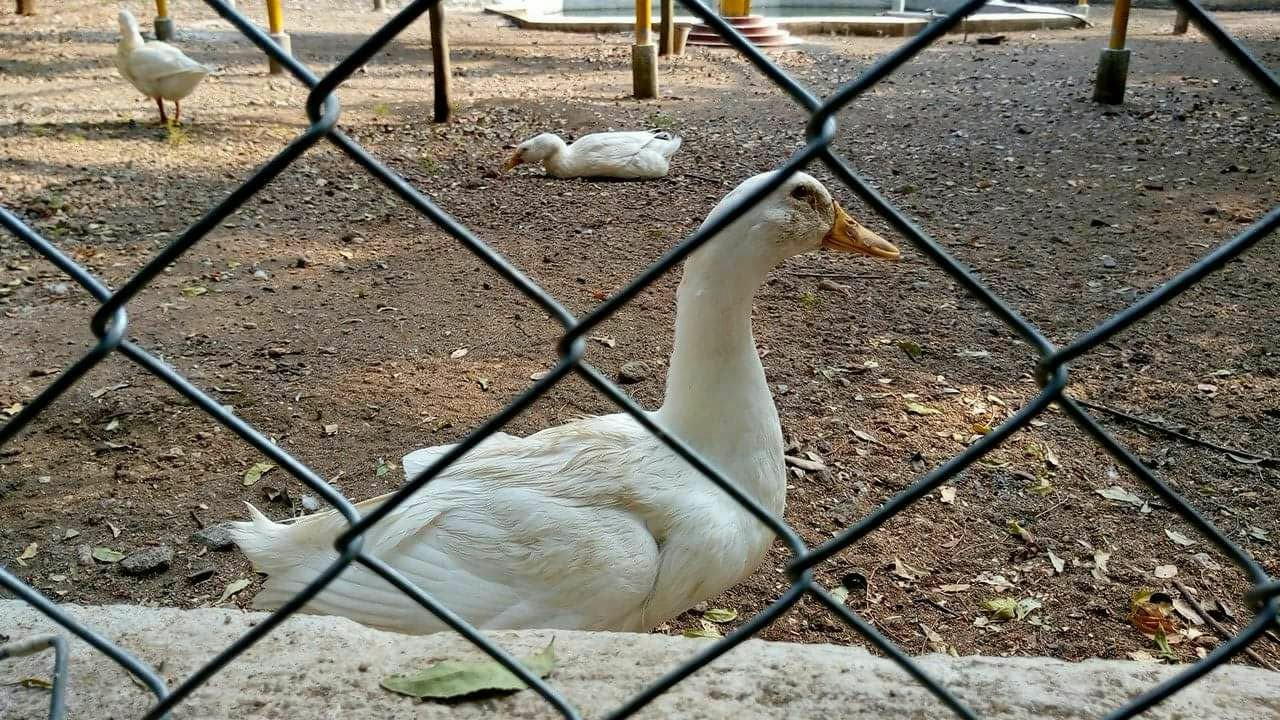
White Duck in Zoo Premises.

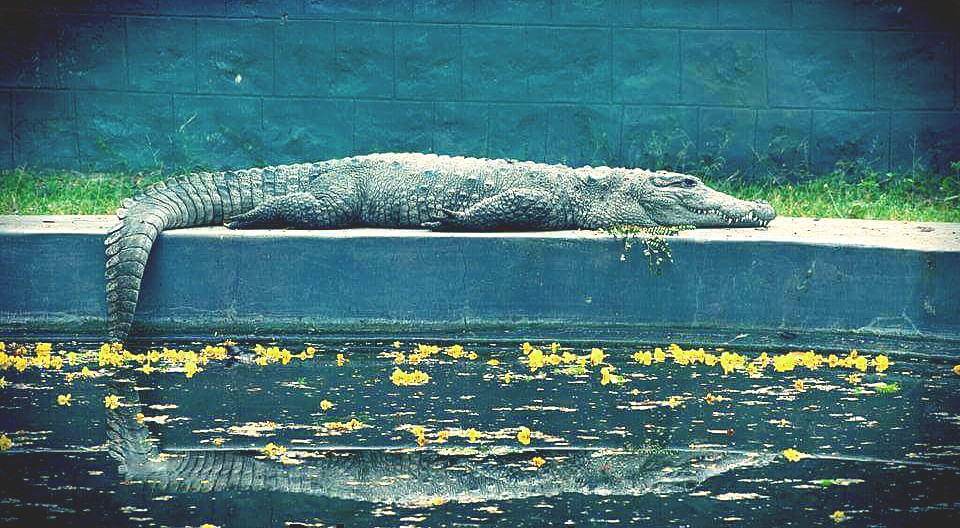
MirrorImage of Zoo Crocodile.

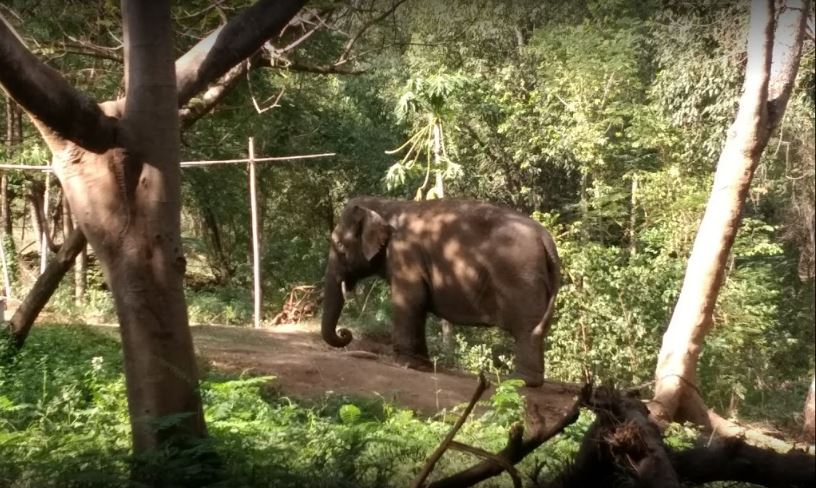
Zoo Elephant Andal.

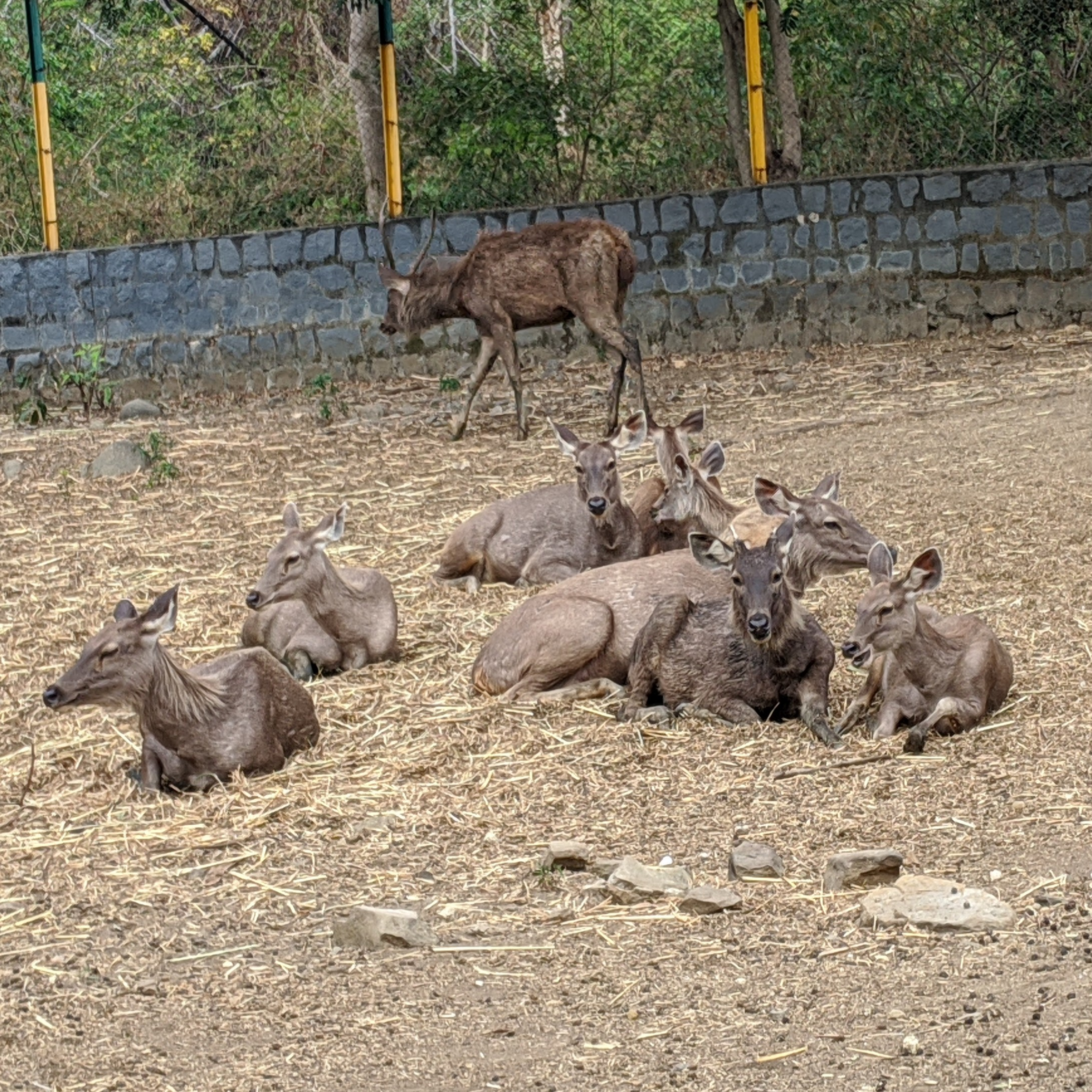
Sambar Deer

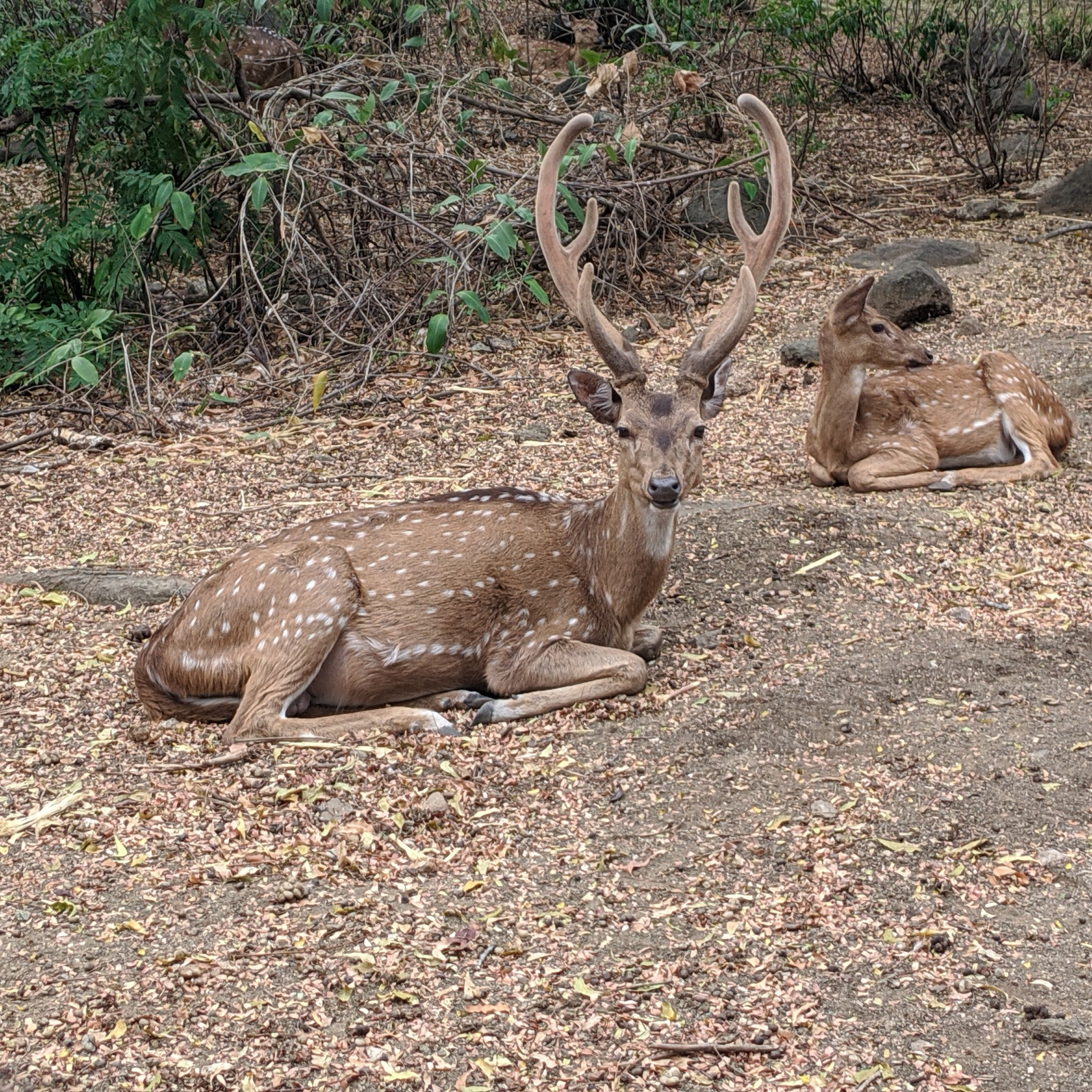
Spotted Deer(Chital)

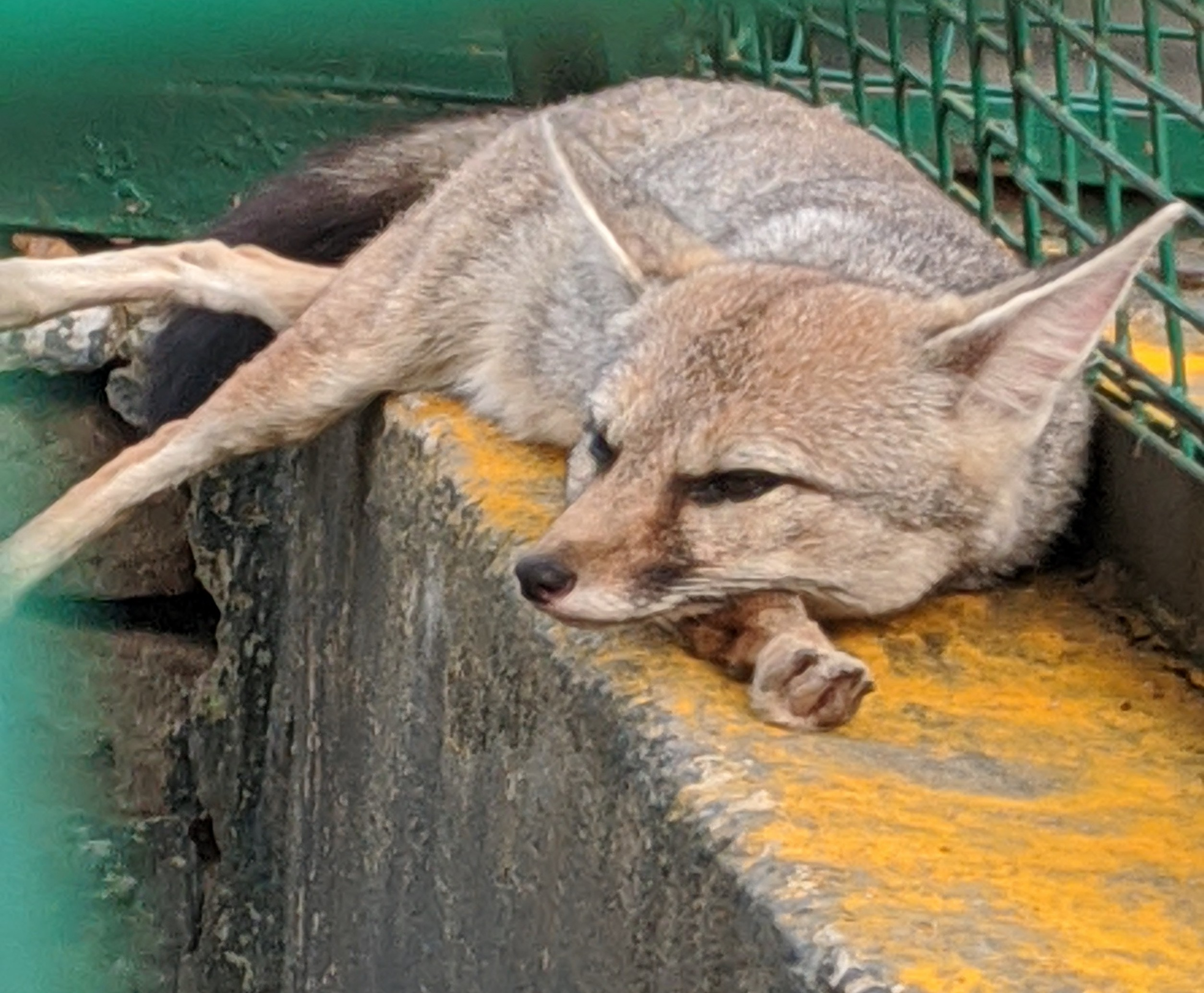
Golden Jackal

== See also ==
- Yercaud, Tamil Nadu
- Shevaroy Hills, Tamil Nadu
- Mettur Dam, Tamil Nadu
- Salem, Tamil Nadu
