= Salem, Tamil Nadu =

City in Tamil Nadu, India

Salem Cēlam
- Metropolis
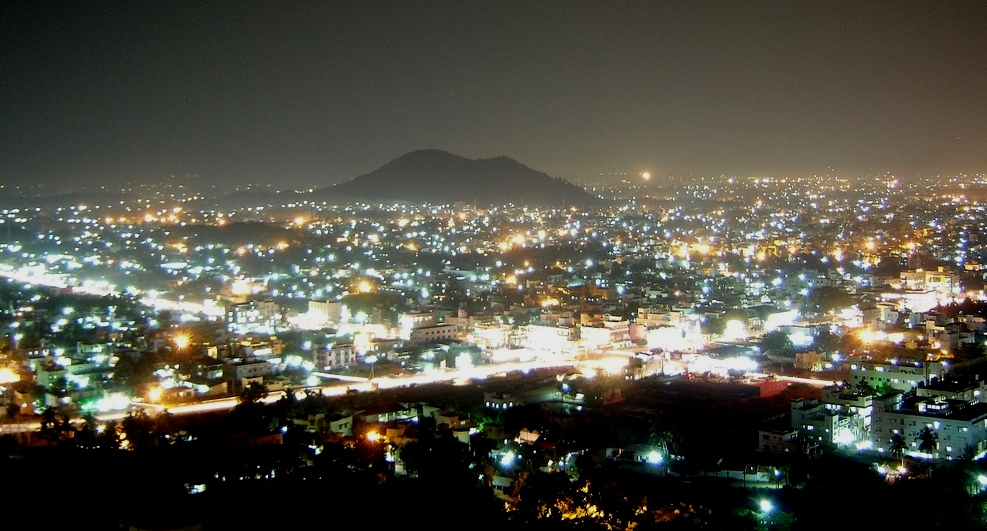
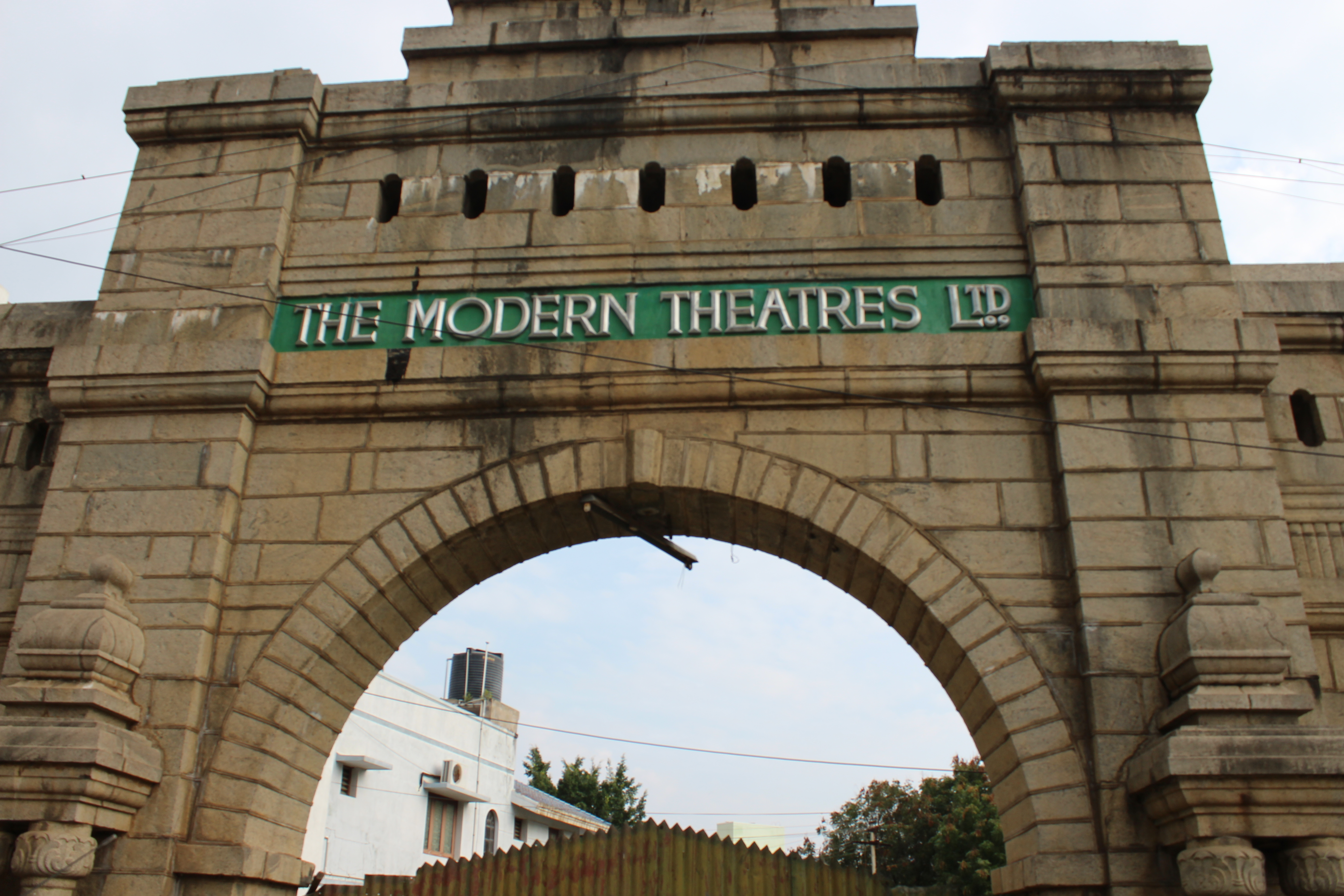
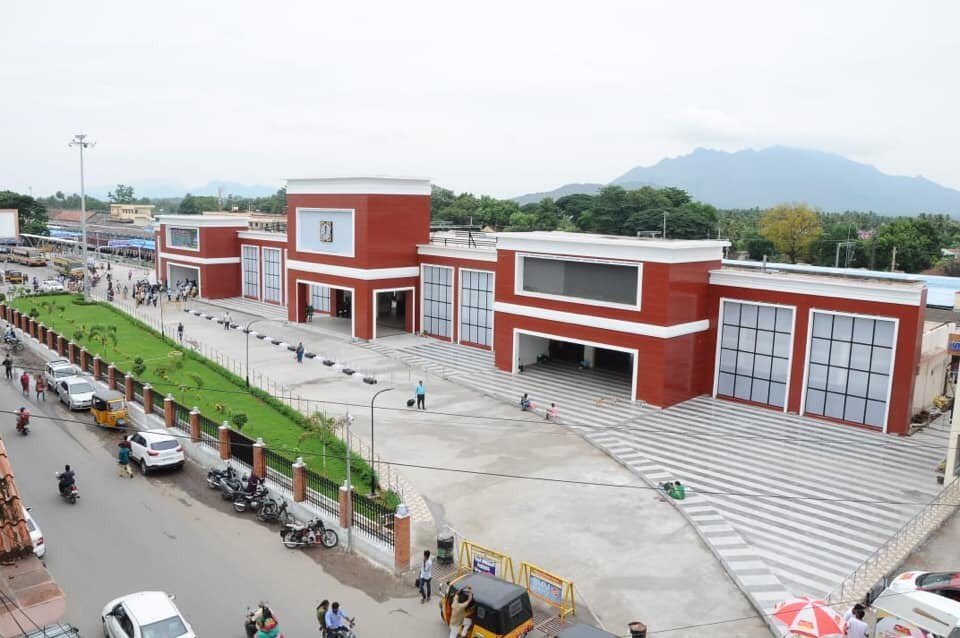
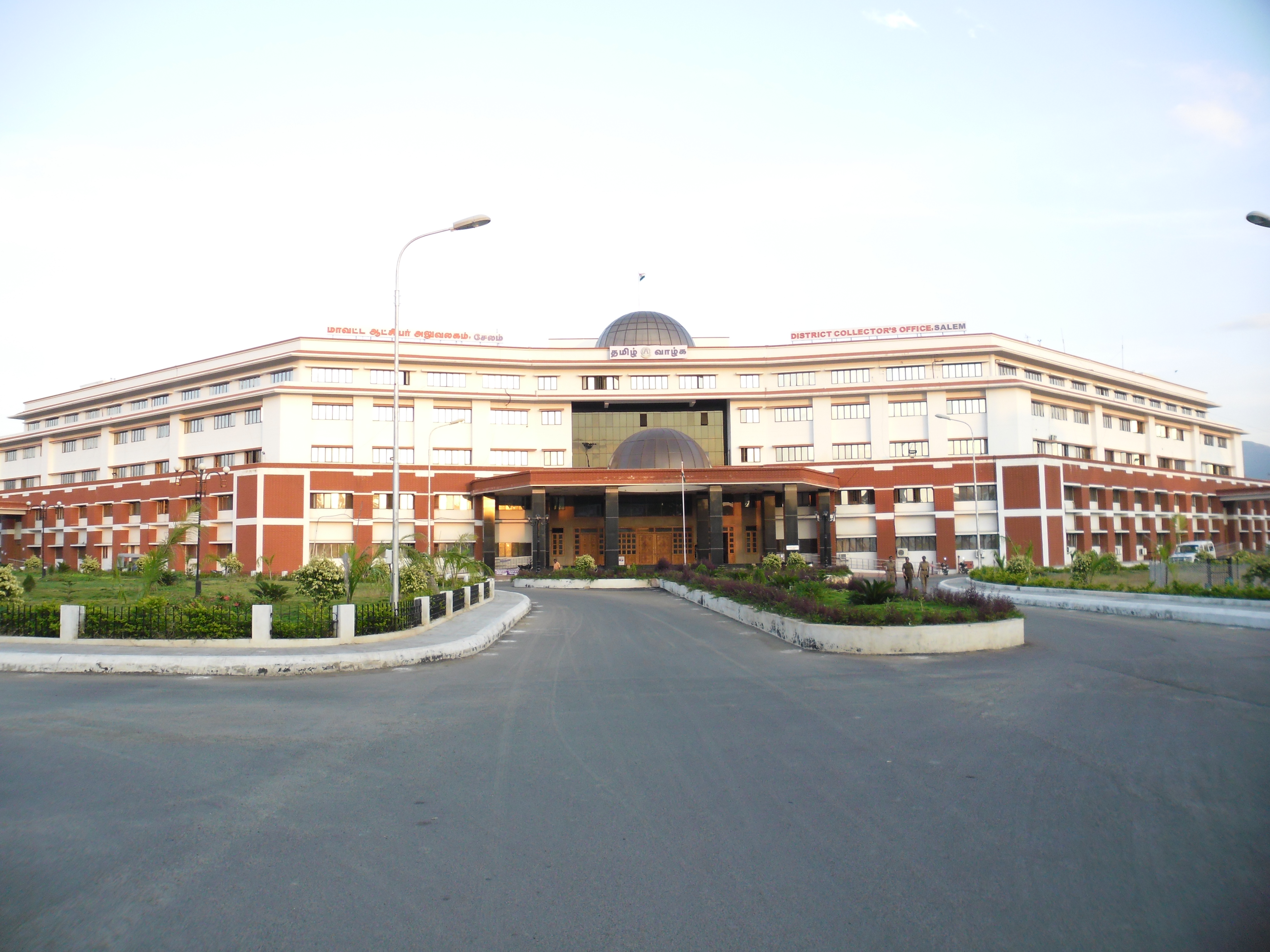
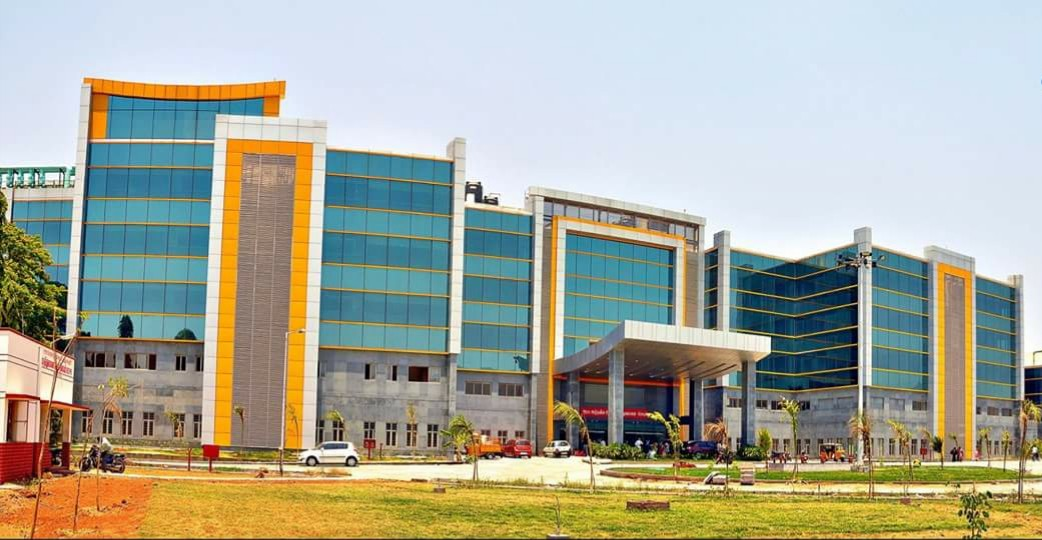
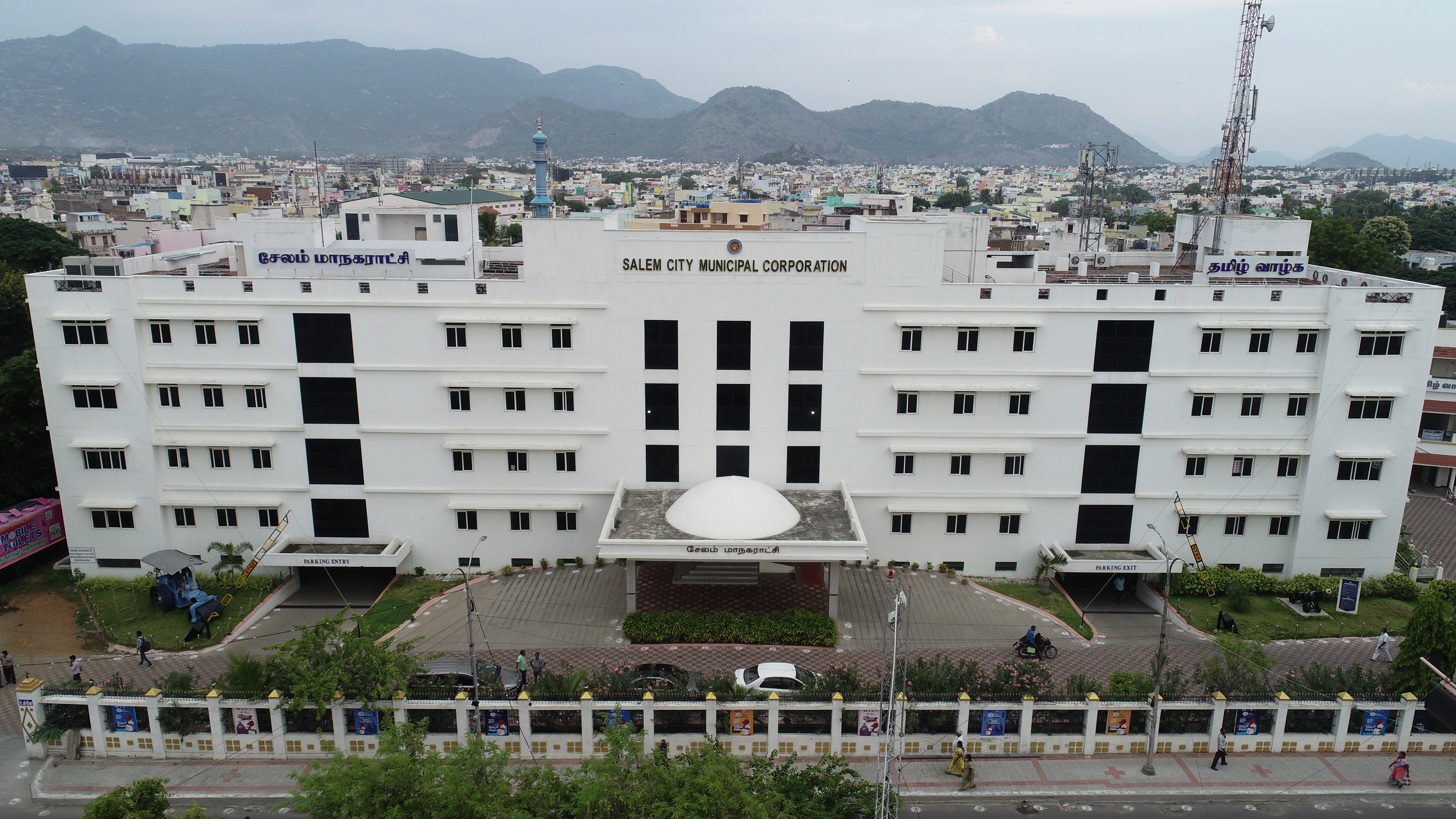
- View of the city Modern Theatres Salem Junction District collectorate Government hospital Municipal corporation

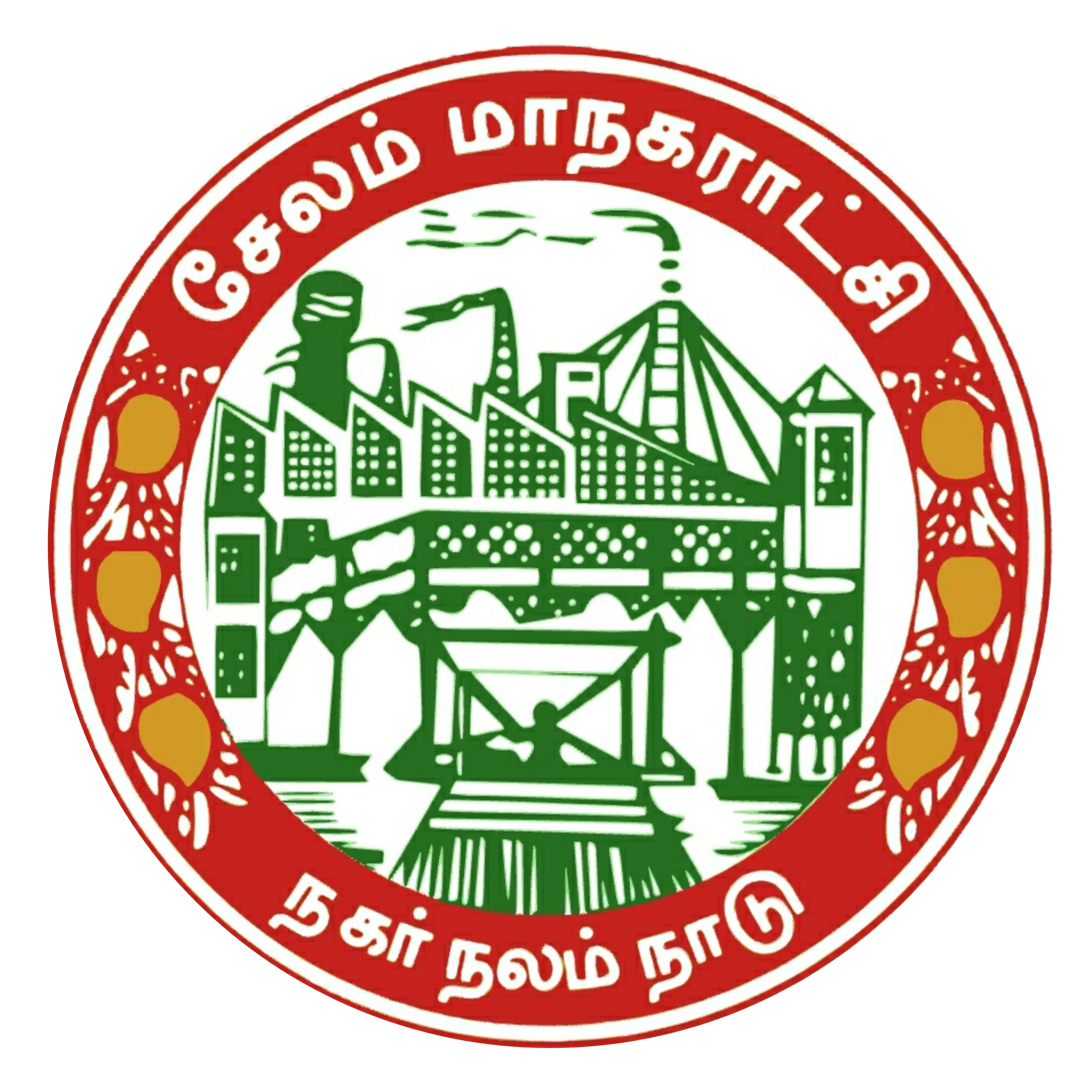
- Coat of arms
- Nickname: Steel City
- Location in Tamil Nadu
- Coordinates: 11.65°N 78.15°E
- Country: India
- State: Tamil Nadu
- District: Salem

Government
  - Type: Mayor–Council
  - Body: Salem City Municipal Corporation
  - Mayor: A. Ramachandran (DMK)

Area
  - Metropolis: 91.34 km^{2} (35.27 sq mi)
  - Metro: 799.59 km^{2} (308.72 sq mi)
  - Rank: 5
- Elevation: 278 m (912 ft)

Population (2011)
  - Metropolis: 829,267
  - Rank: 5th
  - Density: 9,079/km^{2} (23,510/sq mi)
  - Metro: 917,414
  - Metro rank: 6th
- Demonym(s): Salemian, Salethar

Languages
  - Official: Tamil, English
- Time zone: UTC+5:30 (IST)
- PIN: 636xxx
- Telephone code: +91-427
- ISO 3166 code: IN-TN
- Vehicle registration: TN-27, TN-30, TN-52, TN-54, TN-90, TN-93
- HDI: 0.669 medium
- Sex ratio: 987 ♀/ 1000 ♂
- Literacy: 84.42%
- GDP (2020): US$10.354 (equivalent to $12.88 in 2025) billion
- Website: salem.nic.in

Salem (pronounced [seːlam]) is a city in the Indian state of Tamil Nadu. It is located on the banks of the Thirumanimutharu River and surrounded by the Eastern Ghats. It is the fifth largest city in the state as per the 2011 census. It is the administrative capital of Salem District and is administered by the Salem Municipal Corporation which was established in 1994.

The history of the region dates back to the Sangam period (1st–4th centuries CE), when it was part of the Chera Empire. It was engaged in trade with the Roman Empire, evidenced by Roman coins, dating back to the era, found in archeological excavations in the region. The region was ruled by various successive dynasties including the Pandyas, Pallavas, Cholas, and Hoysalas. In the 14th century, it became part of the Vijayanagara Empire, and later ruled by the Madurai Nayaks. During the period, the governance was under the control of local chieftains known as Poligars.

By the late 18th century, it came under the Kingdom of Mysore after conflicts with the Madurai Nayaks. Following the defeat of Tipu Sultan in the Anglo-Mysore Wars, the region was annexed by the British East India Company and integrated into the Madras Presidency. Salem district was formally established in 1792. The region played a role in early resistance against the British, and was the base of Dheeran Chinnamalai during the Second Polygar War. After Indian independence, Salem became part of the Madras Province, which later became Tamil Nadu.

In modern times, Salem has developed into a major industrial and economic hub, known for textiles, steel production, and agro-based industries like sago extraction and mango cultivation. It is home to the Salem Steel Plant and several industrial corridors and special economic zones. The city has a well developed transport network including rail, highways, and an airport, and is home to several educational institutions.

== History ==
The region was part of the Chera Empire during Sangam period between c. 1st and the 4th centuries CE. The city might have had trade connections with the Roman Empire in the 1st century CE, evident from the Roman coins bearing the seal of Emperor Tiberius (37–68 CE) found in the region. In the 2nd century CE, the region came under the rule of the Pandyas. In the 4th century CE, the Pallavas rose to power in the region, and it was the center of conflict between the Pallavas and the Pandyas over the 8th and 9th centuries CE. In the 10th century, the region was captured by the Cholas. After the decline of the Chola Empire in the 12th century CE, the region was under the rule of the Hoysalas and the Later Pandyas in the 12th–13th centuries CE.

The region came under the Vijayanagara Empire in the 14th century CE. It was later governed by Poligars, military chieftains under the Vijayanagara and the later Nayak rule. In the latter part of the 18th century, the region came under the Kingdom of Mysore, following a series of wars with the Madurai Nayak dynasty. After the defeat of Tipu Sultan in the Anglo-Mysore Wars, the British East India Company annexed the region to the Madras Presidency. The Salem district was established in 4 April 1792 and consisted of the present-day districts of Salem, Namakkal, Dharmapuri, and Krishnagiri. The region played a prominent role in the Second Poligar War (1801), when it was the area of operations of Dheeran Chinnamalai. After Indian independence in 1947, it became part of the Madras Province, which later became Tamil Nadu.

== Geography and climate ==
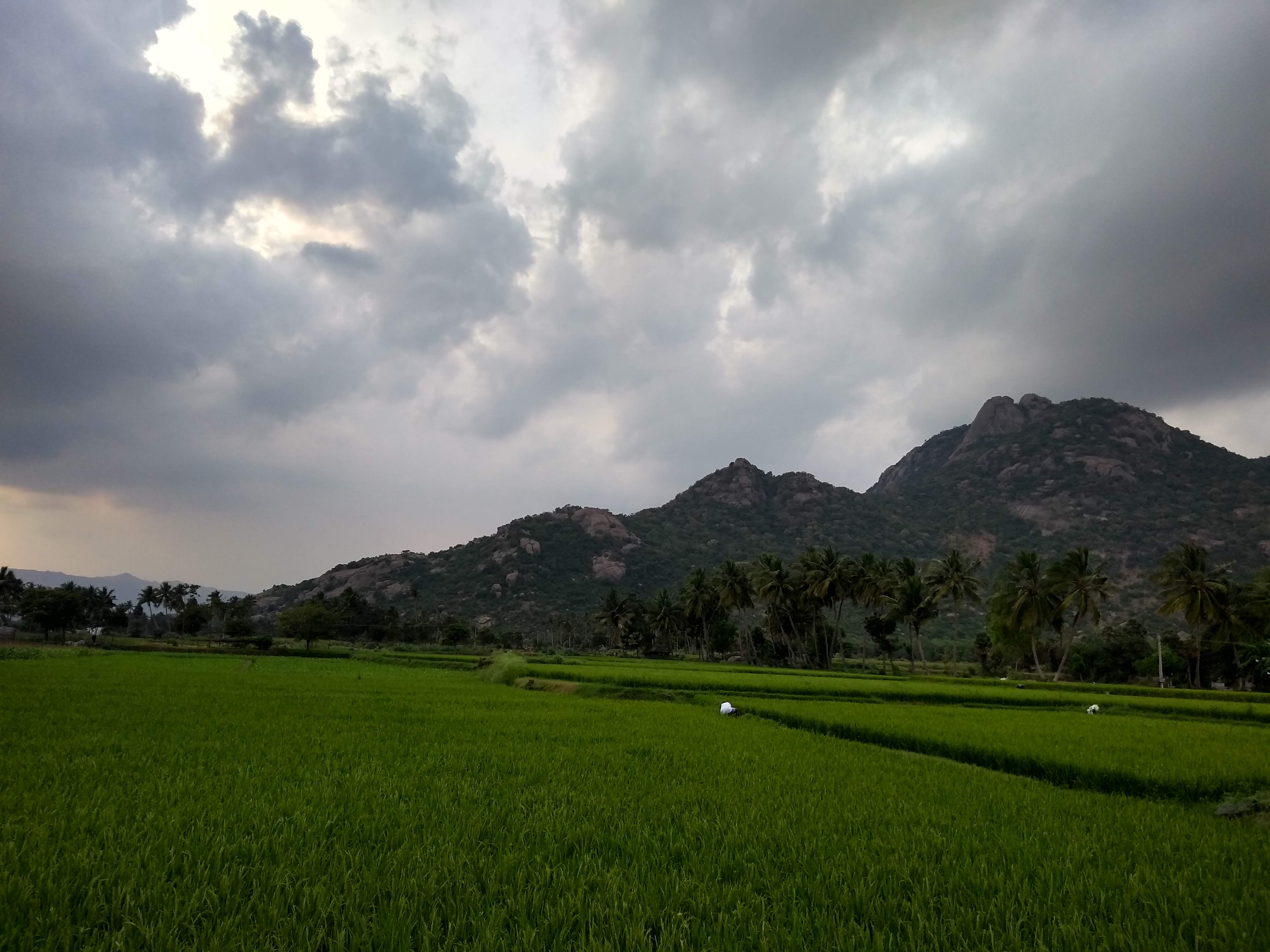
Kalrayan Hills, which abut the city

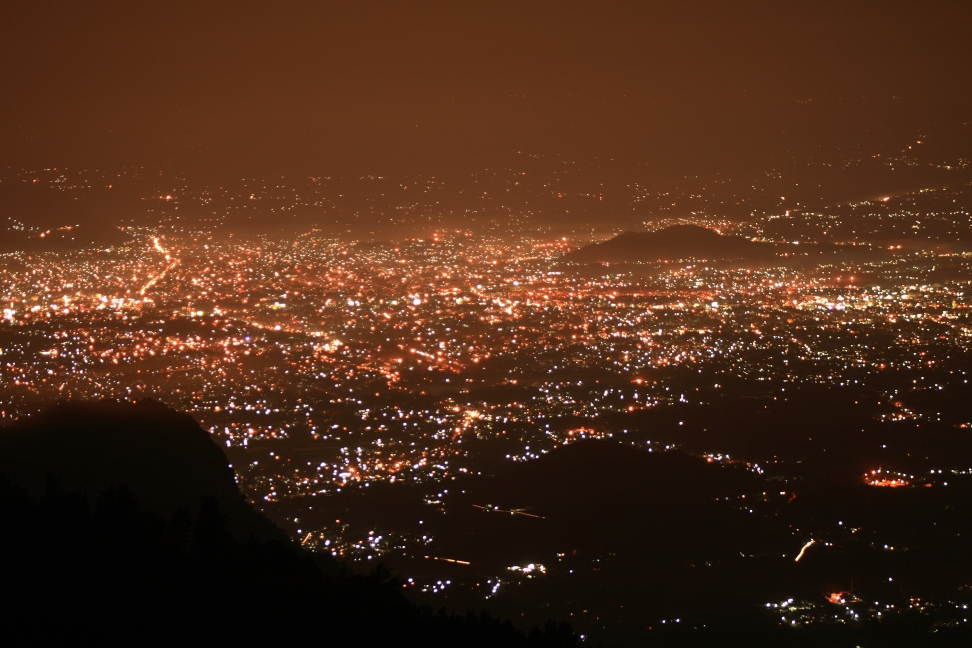
View of Salem from Shevaroy Hills

Salem is located in Western Tamil Nadu, between the Kalrayan and Pachaimalai Hills of the Eastern Ghats. The Thirumanimutharu River flows through the city. The river originates in the Shevaroy Hills, and joins the Kaveri later. The terrain is rocky and undulating with isolated hillocks. Red soil is predominant though black soil is found in isolated pockets.

=== Climate ===
Salem has a tropical climate with a high humidity. The summer extends from March to May, with maximum temperatures in April. The temperature starts to drop in mid June, with the onset of the monsoon. The region receives almost equal rainfall from both southwest and northeast monsoon. November to February are the cooler months, with the temperature dropping to an average minimum of 19.2 °C (66.6 °F) in December.

Climate data for Salem, Tamil Nadu (1991–2020, extremes 1901–2020)
Month	Jan	Feb	Mar	Apr	May	Jun	Jul	Aug	Sep	Oct	Nov	Dec	Year
Record high °C (°F)	37.2 (99.0)	39.8 (103.6)	41.7 (107.1)	42.8 (109.0)	42.8 (109.0)	42.8 (109.0)	40.6 (105.1)	39.9 (103.8)	38.9 (102.0)	37.9 (100.2)	36.4 (97.5)	35.6 (96.1)	42.8 (109.0)
Mean daily maximum °C (°F)	32.1 (89.8)	34.5 (94.1)	37.0 (98.6)	37.8 (100.0)	37.1 (98.8)	35.0 (95.0)	34.1 (93.4)	33.3 (91.9)	33.3 (91.9)	32.2 (90.0)	30.9 (87.6)	30.5 (86.9)	34.0 (93.2)
Mean daily minimum °C (°F)	19.3 (66.7)	20.3 (68.5)	22.6 (72.7)	25.1 (77.2)	25.2 (77.4)	24.3 (75.7)	23.7 (74.7)	23.3 (73.9)	23.1 (73.6)	22.6 (72.7)	21.4 (70.5)	19.8 (67.6)	22.6 (72.7)
Record low °C (°F)	12.8 (55.0)	11.1 (52.0)	14.4 (57.9)	16.5 (61.7)	18.3 (64.9)	19.3 (66.7)	18.9 (66.0)	18.1 (64.6)	18.5 (65.3)	15.5 (59.9)	12.8 (55.0)	12.8 (55.0)	11.1 (52.0)
Average rainfall mm (inches)	2.8 (0.11)	2.8 (0.11)	9.6 (0.38)	58.1 (2.29)	106.6 (4.20)	74.4 (2.93)	88.8 (3.50)	151.2 (5.95)	156.3 (6.15)	197.5 (7.78)	112.5 (4.43)	31.6 (1.24)	992.5 (39.07)
Average rainy days	0.2	0.2	0.4	3.4	5.7	4.7	5.5	8.2	8.2	10.0	6.4	2.6	55.6
Average relative humidity (%) (at 17:30 IST)	45	38	33	41	49	54	56	58	60	67	66	57	52
Source: India Meteorological Department

== Demographics ==
Historical population
Year	Pop.	±%
1871	50,012	—
1881	50,667	+1.3%
1891	67,710	+33.6%
1901	70,621	+4.3%
1911	59,153	−16.2%
1921	52,244	−11.7%
1931	102,179	+95.6%
1941	129,702	+26.9%
1951	203,052	+56.6%
1961	249,145	+22.7%
1971		—
1981		—
1991	366,712	—
2001	696,760	+90.0%
2011	829,267	+19.0%

The city covers an area of 91.34 km^{2} (35.27 sq mi). As per the 2011 census, the city had a population of 829,267 inhabitants. There were 987 females for every 1,000 males. Of these, 79,067 were under the age of six: 40,570 males and 38,497 females. The city's literacy rate was 76.37 percent. Salem had 215,747 households and 332,147 were employed. This included 1,599 farmers, 3,040 agricultural laborers, 32,597 in household industries, 278,892 other workers, 16,019 part-time workers, 165 part-time farmers, 544 part-time agricultural workers, 1,937 part-time workers in household industries, and 13,373 other part-time workers. Tamil was the most spoken language with 73.8% of the population citing it as their native language. Other significant languages included Telugu (10.8%), Kannada (5.83%), and Urdu (5%).

== Administration and politics ==
Municipal officials
Commissioner	Elangovan
Mayor	A. Ramachandran (DMK)
Deputy Mayor	Saradha Devi (DMK)
Member of Legislative Assembly
Salem North	R. Rajendhran (DMK)
Salem West	Arul Ramadoss(PMK)
Salem South	E. Balasubramanian (AIADMK)
Member of Parliament
Salem	T. M. Selvaganapathy (DMK)

Salem is the headquarters of Salem district. The town was constituted as a municipality in 1867, and was upgraded to a special-grade municipality in 1979 and to a municipal corporation on 1 April 1994. The city is organised into 72 wards, each represented by an elected councillor. The Salem Municipal Corporation is headed by a mayor, who is elected by the councillors. The administration is governed by a municipal commissioner, and it is divided into six departments: general administration and personnel, engineering, revenue, public health, city planning and information technology.

Prior to 2008, the city was part of the Salem I and Salem II assembly constituencies. Since 2008, the city accommodates three constituencies– Salem North, Salem South and Salem West, that elect members to the Tamil Nadu Legislative Assembly. The city is part of the Salem constituency that elects its member to the Lok Sabha.

Law and order is maintained by the Salem city subdivision of the Tamil Nadu Police, headed by a Police commissioner. Special units include prohibition enforcement, district crime, social justice and human rights, district crime records and a district-level special branch headed by a superintendent of police. The Salem Central Prison which is located at Hastampatti, and serves as the central prison for Salem district. Constructed in 1862, it is one of the oldest prisons in India and has a capacity of 1431 inmates.

== Economy ==
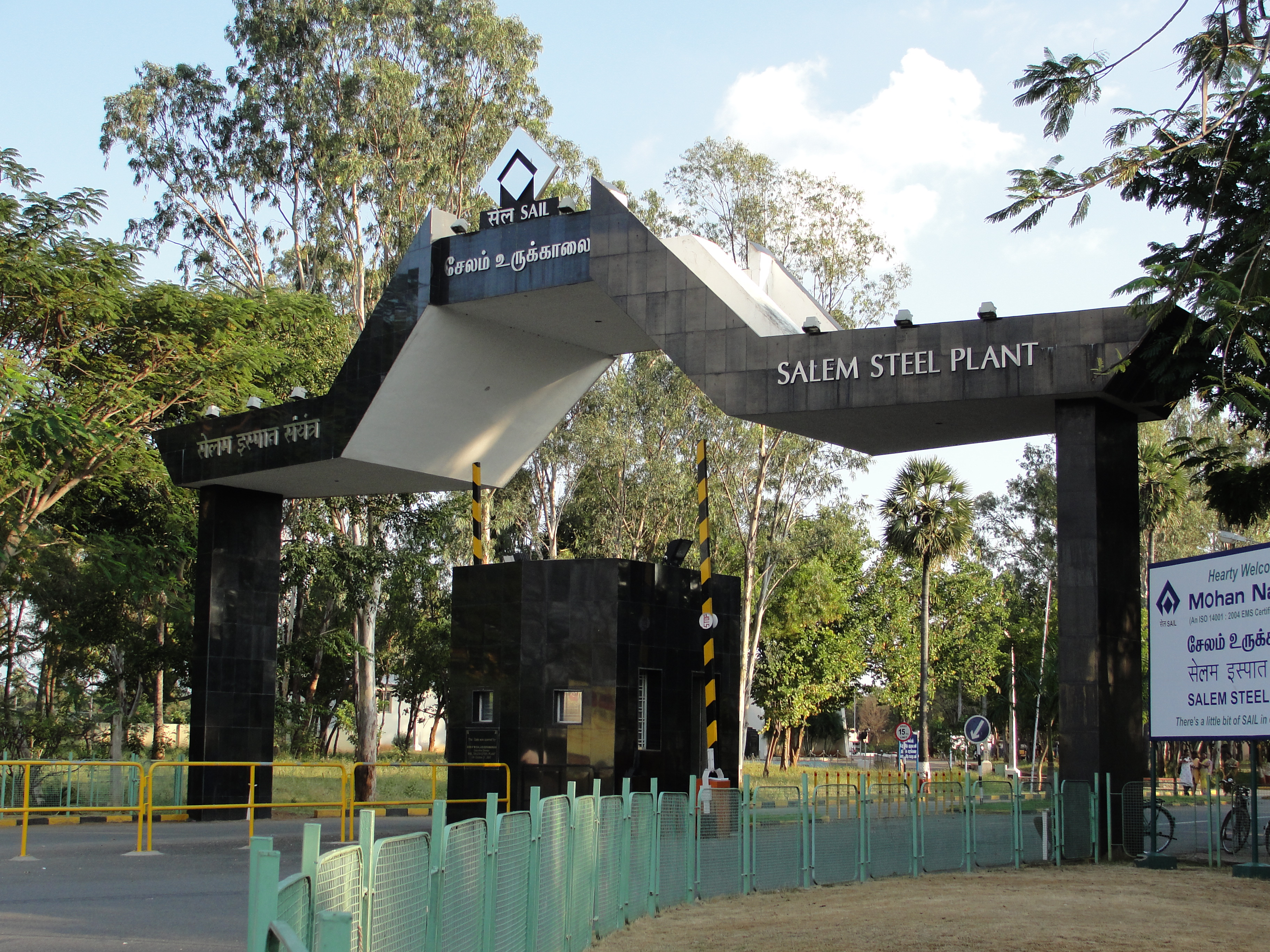
Salem Steel Plant

As of 2020, Salem had a GDP of US$10.354 (equivalent to $12.88 in 2025) billion. The town is a major textile centre, with more than 75,000 handlooms and spinning mills in the region. The region is popular for its silk textiles. Salem Fabric and Salem silk are recognised as Geographical indications in India. Cassava cultivation in prominent in the region, and there are more than 650 industrial units which are engaged in the extraction of sago from the cassava plants. In 1981, the Salem Starch and Sago Manufacturers Service Industrial Co-operative Society was established to promote the industry and nearly 80 percent of the national demand for sago and starch is met by the region. Salem is popular for its mangoes, with several cultivars grown in the region.

The city is a major centre of steel industry. The Salem Steel Plant, a unit of the Steel Authority of India (SAIL), was established in 1981, and produces stainless steel and stainless-carbon steel alloys. The plant was expanded and modernized in the late 2000s, with steel-melting and continuous-casting facilities. The SAIL has established a 250 acres (100 ha) special economic zone within its Salem plant. The Southern Iron and Steel Company has an integrated steel plant in Salem for the production of TMT bars and alloy steels. The region is rich in mineral ores, with significant magnesite and bauxite deposits, with several public and private companies operating in the mining and processing sector. The Electronics Corporation of Tamil Nadu has established a 160 acres (65 ha) Information Technology park, and an electrical and electronics industrial estate is in the Suramangalam area of the city.

== Transport ==
=== Air ===
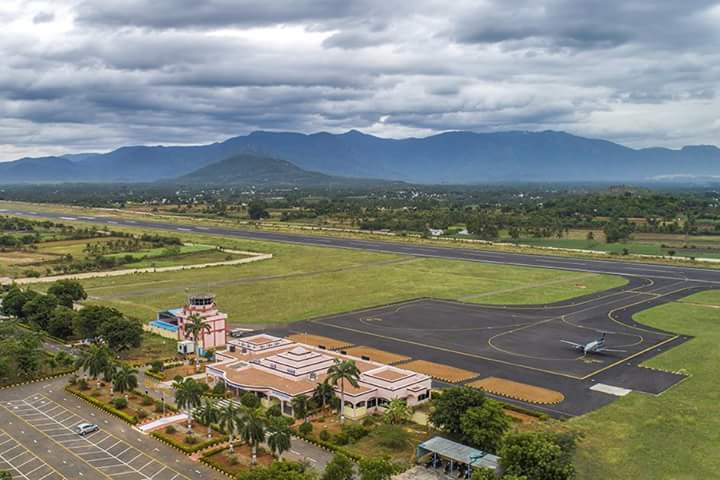
Salem Airport

Salem Airport is located at Kamalapuram, about 20 km (12 mi) from the city. It was built at a cost of ₹60 million (US$620,000), and opened in April 1993. The airport had seen intermittent operations since its opening to the mid 2010s. In 2018, the airport was one of the destinations identified under the Government of India's UDAN regional connectivity scheme. In March 2018, the Ministry of Civil Aviation changed the status of the airport to "unserved" to enable the introduction of flights under the scheme. After the airport remained closed for commercial operations again since 2022, Alliance Air and IndiGo launched flights from the airport in October 2023. In 2026, the Government of India approved the modified UDAN Scheme for ten years period from financial year 2026–27 to 2035–36, continuing the regional connectivity programme beyond the original phase of the scheme.

=== Rail ===
Salem Junction is a major railhead in the region, and is the main station serving the city. In 2006, the Salem railway division was created by the Southern Railway zone of the Indian Railways. The station was rated as the cleanest station among the divisional headquarters railway stations according to a report published in June 2017. Salem Town is the other railway station in the city.

=== Road ===
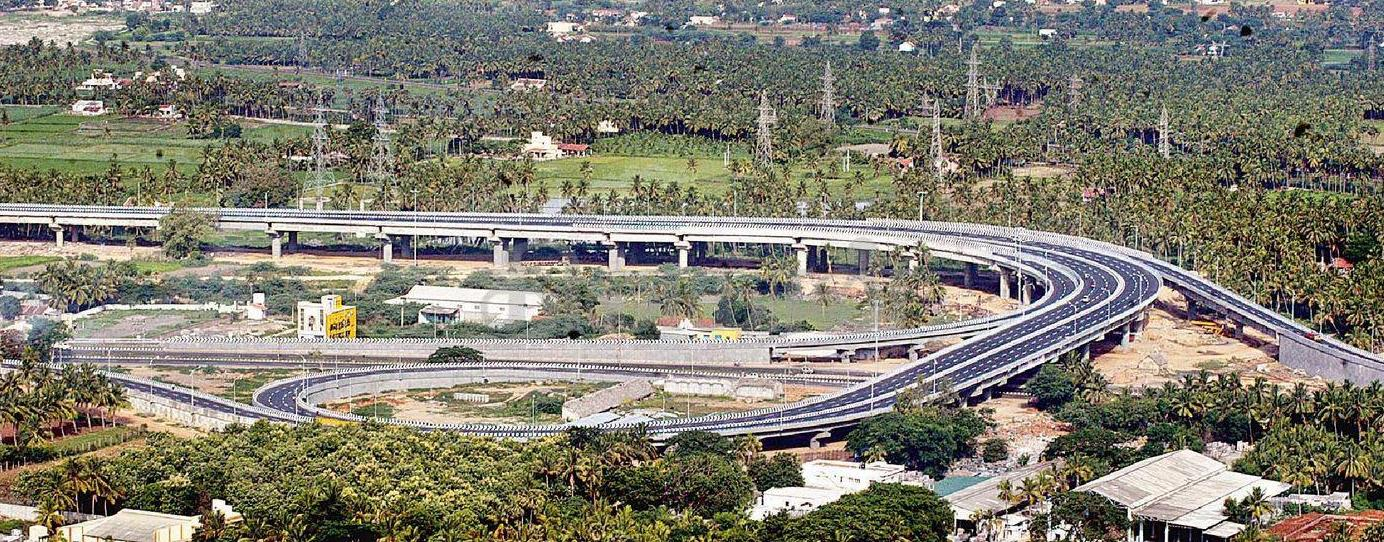
A flyover in the city

The National Highway 44, the longest highway in the country, passes through the city. It forms part of the north-south corridor connecting Srinagar with Kanyakumari. Three other highways branch out from the NH 44, NH 544 towards Kochi, NH 79 towards Ulundurpet, and 179A towards Jolarpettai.

Salem is the headquarters of the Salem division of the Tamil Nadu State Transport Corporation, which operates intra and inter city bus services. It was established in 1973, and operates five depots in the city. The Town Bus Terminus serves intracity routes, and interstate and private buses originate at the Central Bus Terminus. A new bus stand has been proposed at Jagirammapalayam, in the outskirts of the city. The city has four Regional Transport Offices viz. TN 27 (City), TN 30 (West), TN 54 (East), TN 90 (South).

== Culture ==
=== Religion ===
Religions in Salem (2011)
Religion	Percent
Hindu	89.79%
Muslim	7.48%
Christian	2.36%
Jain	0.11%
Other	0.26%

As per the religious census, Hinduism was the dominant religion with 89.79% adherents, with Islam (7.48%) and Christianity (2.36%) being the major minority religions. There are several Hindu temples in the city. The Kottai Mariamman Temple (ta), dedicated to the goddess Mariamman, has an annual five-day festival during the Tamil month of Aadi (mid-July to mid-August). The Sukhavaneswarar Temple (ta) is dedicated to Shiva, which was named after sage Sukha, and is mentioned in the hymns of Arunagirinathar. The Alagirinathar Temple is dedicated to Vishnu. Jamia Masjid is the oldest mosque in the city and lies on the southern bank of the Thirumanimutharu River. It was reportedly built in the late 19th century. The Christ Church is located on Fort Road and was consecrated in 1875. Lechler Memorial Church, the oldest church in the city, was built in 1856 by a German missionary in Fort Salem.

=== Cuisine ===
Thattu vadai set (or simply called as settu) is a savory snack and popular street food, which originated in Salem. These are sold in several roadside stalls set up on the streets of Salem. It is a sandwich of two crunchy thattai discs with vegetable fillings smeared with various chutneys. There are several varieties of the same, depending on the ingredients used such as eggs, raw mango, or murukku. Norukkal Mix is another popular snack, made up of smashed murukku, mixed with chutney, cut vegetables, and chilli powder.

== Education ==
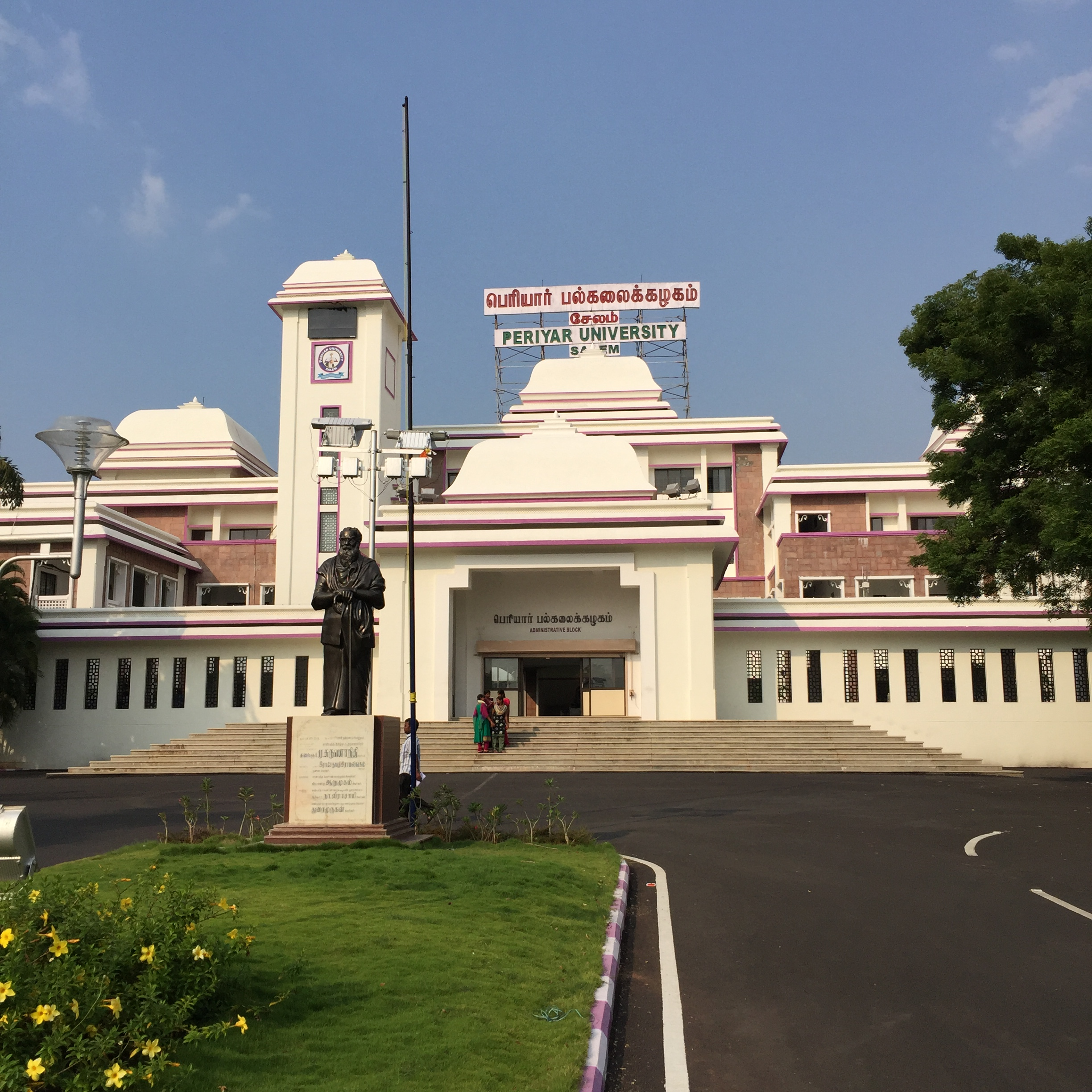
Periyar University

Schools consist of government run, government aided, and private schools.

Salem has several institutions of higher education.

- Thiagarajar Polytechnic College was founded 1958.
- Indian Institute of Handloom Technology was established by the Ministry of Textiles in 1960.
- Government College of Engineering was established in 1966.
- Mohan Kumaramangalam Medical College was established in 1986.
- Government Law College opened in August 2019.

There are two universities in the city. The Vinayaka Mission established its first college in 1987, and was later declared as deemed to be university. The Periyar University was established in 1997.

== Sports and recreation ==
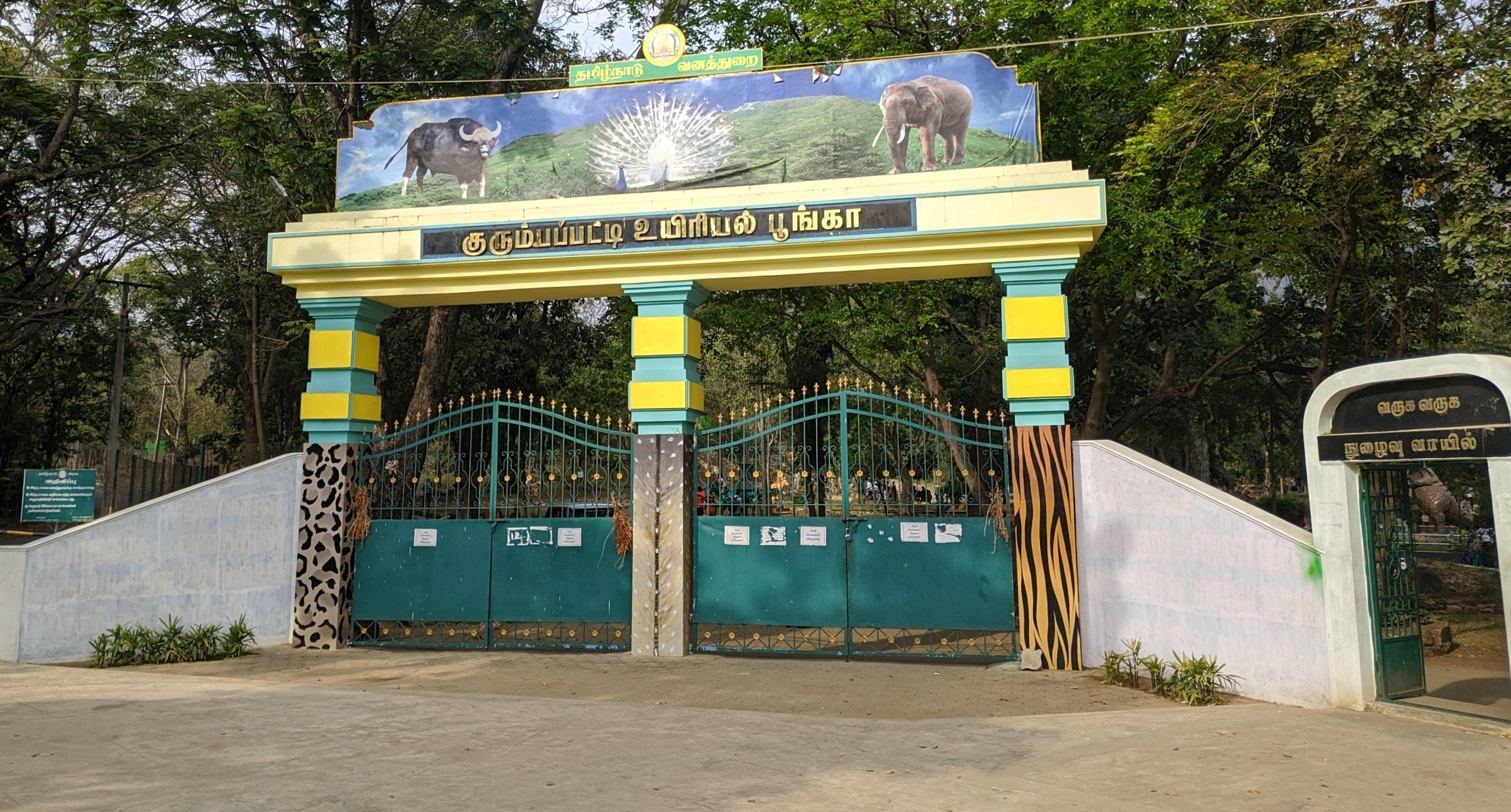
Kurumbapatti Zoological Park

There are several shopping malls and bazaars in the city. The Kurumbapatti Zoological Park and Anna Park are government-run parks. There are a few amusement parks in the city. The Mookaneri Lake is a popular tourist place and bird watching destination. Yercaud, a major hill station, is about 20 kilometres (12 mi) from Salem.

Mahatma Gandhi Stadium is a multi-purpose sports venue in the city. Cricket clubs in the city are managed by the Salem District Cricket Association. There are two cricket grounds in the city. The Salem Cricket Foundation Stadium was built at a cost of ₹30 million (US$310,000) in Karivepilapatti and inaugurated on 10 February 2020. Salem Spartans, a Tamil Nadu Premier League team, is based out of the city. Prominent athletes from the city include T. Natarajan, who plays for the Indian national cricket team.

== International relations ==
Salem has had a sister city relationship with Salem, Oregon in the United States. The agreement was signed in 1964.

== Notable people ==
- Salem Ramaswamy Mudaliar — lawyer, politician and Indian independence activist
- Taj Noor — music director
- A. R. Rao — mathematician
- M. R. Srinivasaprasad — cricketer and coporate executive
- Arthanareesa Varma (1874–1964) — poet and independence activist
- Tiruvadi Sambasiva Venkataraman — botanist
- Sivasankar Natarajan — Judge of Supreme Court of India

== See also ==
- Largest Indian Cities by GDP
