= Arthanareesa Varma =

Indian freedom fighter

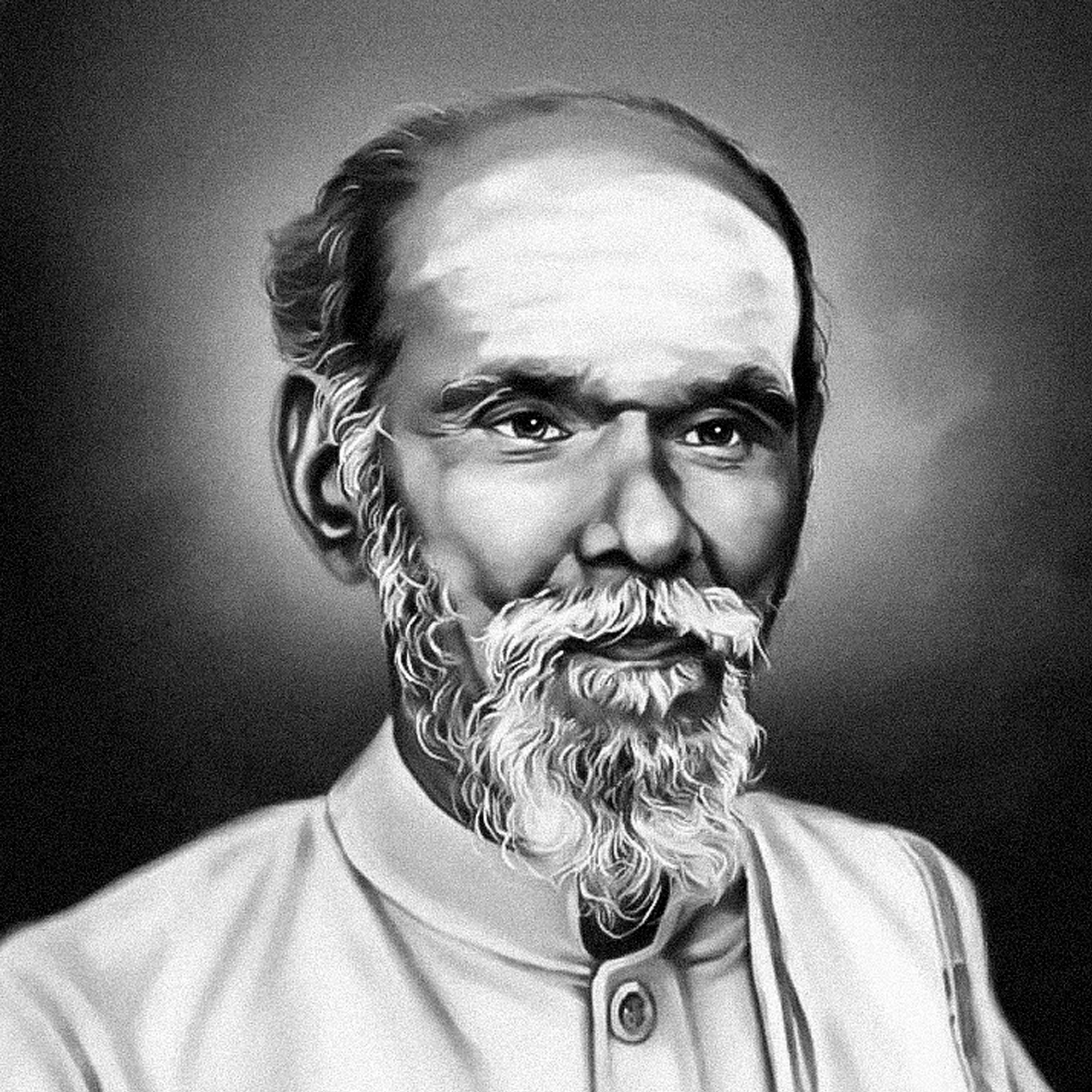
- Born: 27 July 1874; Salem, Madras Presidency, British India (now Tamil Nadu, India)
- Died: 7 December 1964 (aged 90); Thiruvannamalai, Madras State (now Tamil Nadu), India
- Other names: Kavichingam, Rajarishi, Nayagar
- Occupations: Journalist, poet, writer, freedom fighter
- Movement: Indian independence movement

Arthanareesa Varma or Raja Rishi Arthanareesa Varma was an Indian freedom fighter, poet, author and journalist. He is known for his prominent role in Vanniyar politics.

== Early life ==
Arthanareesa Varma was born to Sugavana Padayatchi and Lakshmi Ammal on 27 July 1874 at Salem in present-day Tamil Nadu.

== Biography ==
In 1911, Varma worked as manager of a publishing house called “Swadesh Abimani”. He was impressed by the poems of Subramania Bharatiyar. In 1931, Varma himself published a journal called “Veera Bharathi” and was its editor. The aim of the journal was to spread the news of freedom movement and its activities throughout India. He is the friend of Indian freedom fighter Thiru. R.R. Chinna RamaGounder. The British government brought amendment to the Journals Regulation Act to ban news journal support of the Indian freedom movement. Varma's "Veerabharathi" was also banned by the British government.

He was the only poet to write verse elegy on Subramania Bharati's death.

Varma played a prominent role in Vanniyar politics. He was considered as stalwart of Vanniyar politics.

== Death ==
Varma died at Tiruvannamalai, present-day Tamil Nadu, on 7 December 1964.

== Works ==
=== Journals ===
- Kshatriyan
- Kshathriya Sigamani
- Tamil Mannan
- Sri Vanni Vamsa Pirakasikai
- Vanniyakula Mitran
- Viraparati

== Honour and recognition ==
Uttar Pradesh Chief Minister Yogi Adityanath, upon meeting the BJP Secretary from Tamil Nadu, made the decision to issue an honorary stamp and coin. The Home Minister subsequently gave clearance to mint a coin and print a postage stamp honoring Varma.

The Central Government of India, Ministry of Communications - Department of Posts (Philately Division) Vide Ministry of Home Affairs (CIC) Division, by Letter No.20011/01/2023, granted approval at the Madras High Court, on March 3, 2023.

== In popular culture ==
The film Bison Kaalamaadan (2025) features a portrait of Varma, in a conversation scene between the protagonist "Vanathi" Kittan (Dhruv Vikram) and Kandeeban (Azhagam Perumal).
