= Alagirinathar Temple =

Sundararaja Perunal Temple
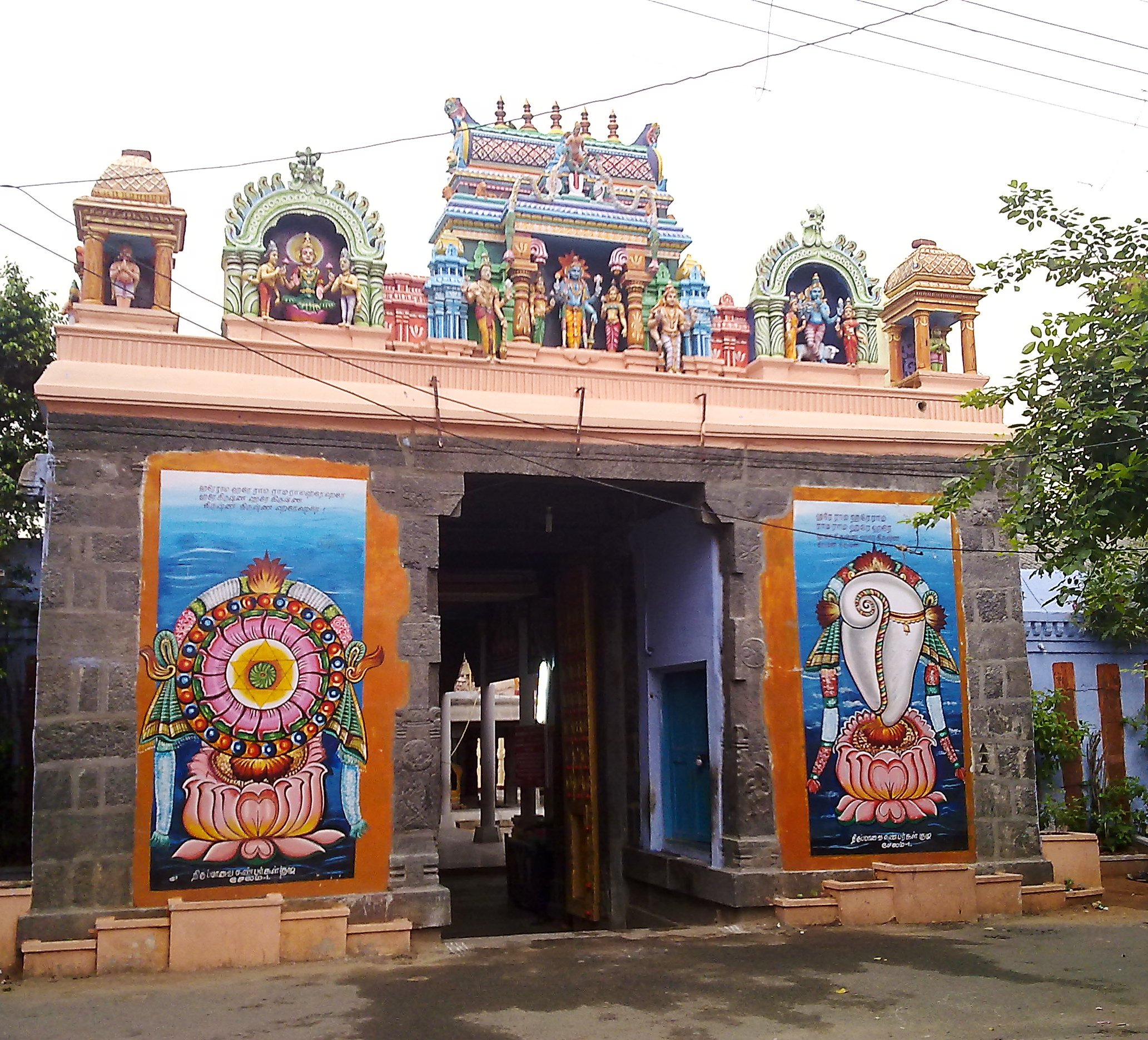
- Entrance of Sundararaja Perumal Temple

- Location within Salem Location within Tamil Nadu Location within India

Religion
- Affiliation: Hinduism
- Deity: Sundararaja Perumal (Vishnu) Sundaravalli (Lakshmi)

Location
- Location: Salem
- State: Tamil Nadu
- Country: India
- Coordinates: TN 11.65°N 78.15°E

Architecture
- Type: Dravidian architecture
- Creator: Cheras, Cholas, Pandyas and Pallavas

Alagirinathar Temple (also known as Kottai Perumal Koil & Kottai Alagirinathar Koil) is a Hindu temple dedicated to the god Vishnu, located on the banks of the Thirumanimutharu river at Salem, Tamil Nadu, India. The temple is one of 108 Abhimana Kshethram of Vaishnavate tradition. The temple is also one of the Pancha Kshethram where in mythology Vishnu's consort Lakshmi was born as Bhargavi, the daughter of the sage Bhrigu.

The temple follows Vaikhanasa agama and the temple priests perform the pooja rituals during festivals and on a daily basis. The priests belong to the Vadakalai sect of Vaishnavism, a Brahmin sub-caste.

== Legend ==
As per Hindu legend, Alagirinathar (Azhagirinathar), a form of Hindu god Vishnu, appeared for the sage Bhrigu, who performed penance in the bank of Thirumanimuthar.

The sage did not get the attention of Vishnu and in his anger, he kicked Vishnu on his chest. Vishnu's consort Lakshmi, who also resides in Vishnu's chest, was agitated as her husband did not reprimand the sage for his action. She left their divine abode Vaikuntha and reached earth and took the form of Padmavathi. Vishnu followed her and married her.

Padmavathi was still angry with Vishnu. The sage Bhrigu apologized and requested Lakshmi to be born to him as Sundaravalli in his next birth. The sage was reborn as Bhrigu again and performed penance to attain Lakshmi as his daughter. Vishnu was pleased by the penance and granted his wish. One day, he found a girl under a Tulasi plant in a garden in his ashram and influenced by her beauty named him Sundaravali (lit. "beautiful girl"). Vishnu descended to earth as Alagirinathar. He convinced Lakshmi to marry him and the couple eventually got married.

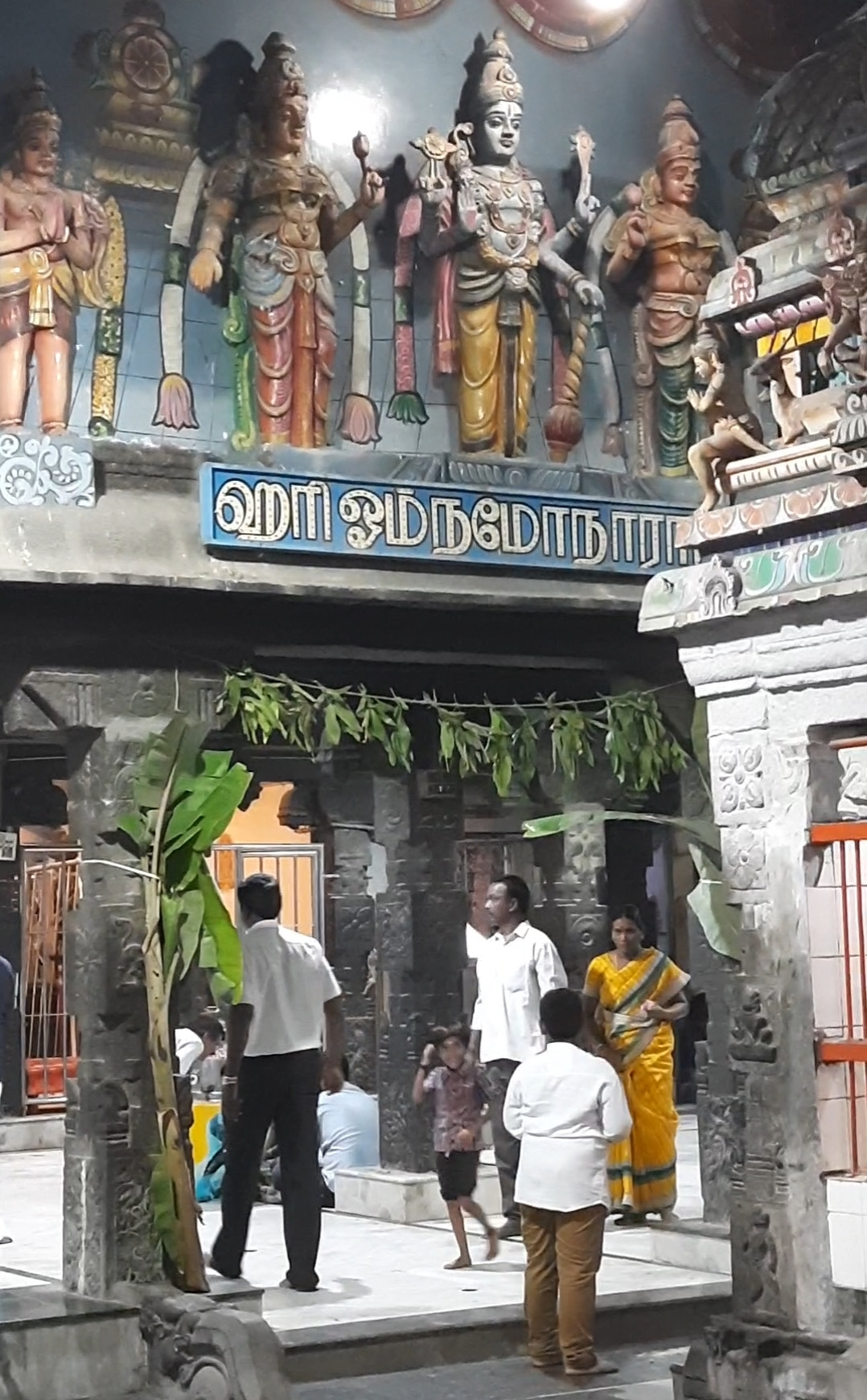
Entrance of the Mandapa dedicated to Vishnu

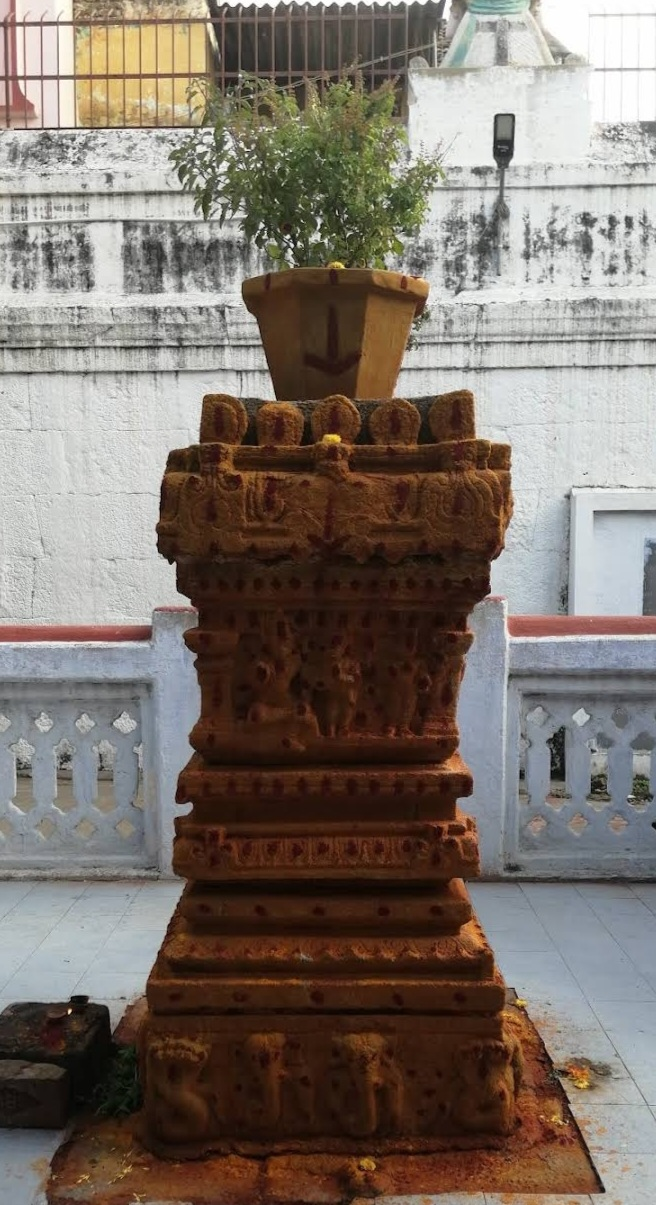
Thulasi madam where Sundaravalli is said to be taken by Bhrigu Maharishi

== History ==
The Temple is constructed in various periods by various kings. It is said that all the three main kingdoms Chera, Chola and Pandya's had worshipped. The temple has received many donations from king Jatavarman Sundara Pandyan I, he donated pillars for the temple and assigned Bhattars for the daily aradhanas to Perumal.

The temple is maintained and administered by the Hindu Religious and Charitable Endowments Department of the Government of Tamil Nadu.

== Architecture ==
The temple has beautiful sculptured pillars and there are many carvings of monkeys on the ceilings of the temple. It is one of the most oldest temples of the district and has 4 huge mandapas (halls) - one for the god Krishna (an avatar of Vishnu) and other two for Alagirinathar (the chief god) and his consort goddess Sundaravalli. Apart from the shrines of Alagirinathar and Sundaravalli Thayar, there are separate shrines for Venugopla Krishna (a form of Krishna), Kothandarama (Rama), Santhana gopala (Krishna), Chakrathazhwar, Andal, Alvars and Vaishnavate acharyas. The temple has a huge Mirror mandapa just like Srivilliputhur Andal temple. There is a small garden where stories of the Bhagavata Purana are portrayed and also has paintings of the epics Ramayana and the Mahabharata. The temple has the swarga vasal door which opens once a year during Vaikuntha Ekadashi.

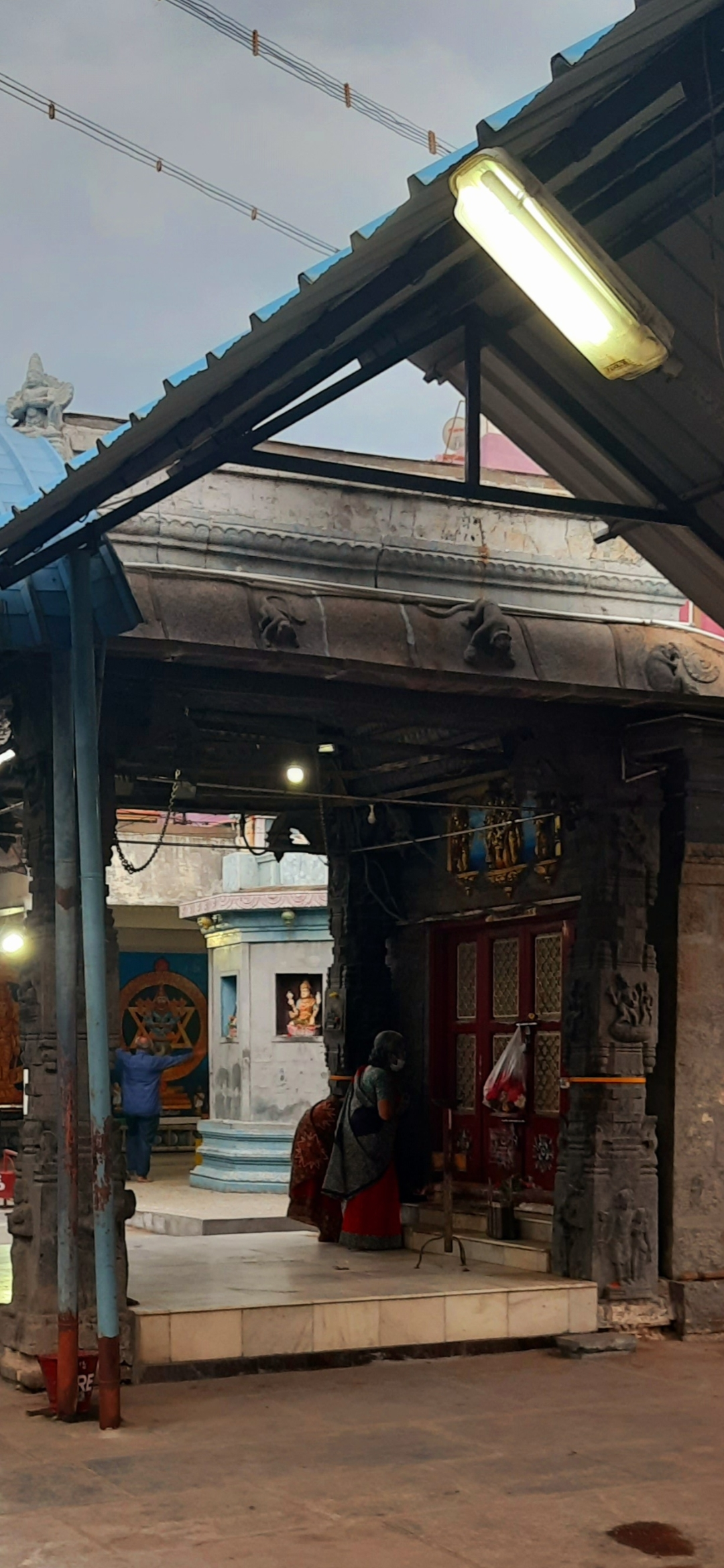
Sculpture of monkey on the temple

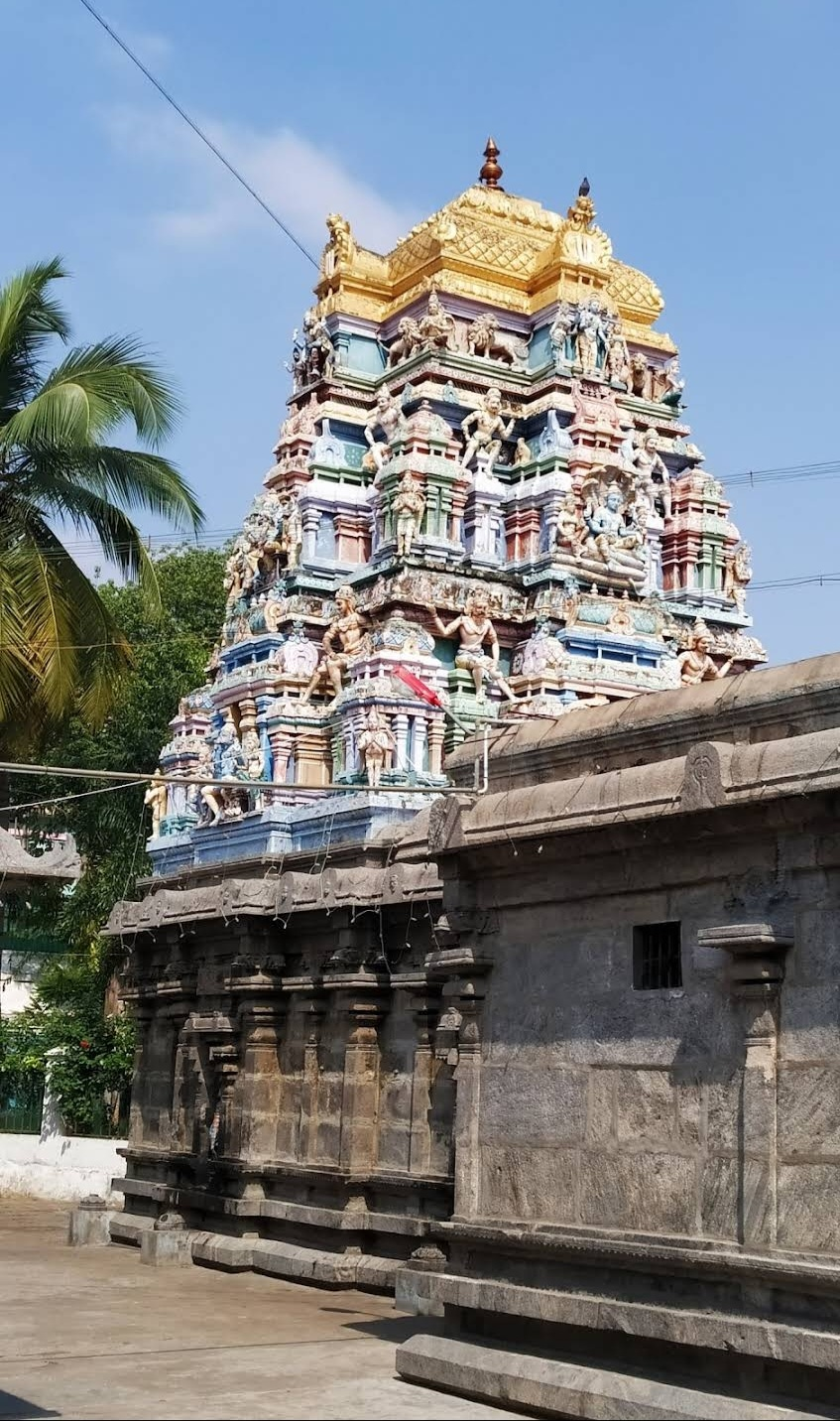
Alagirinathar's Vimanam

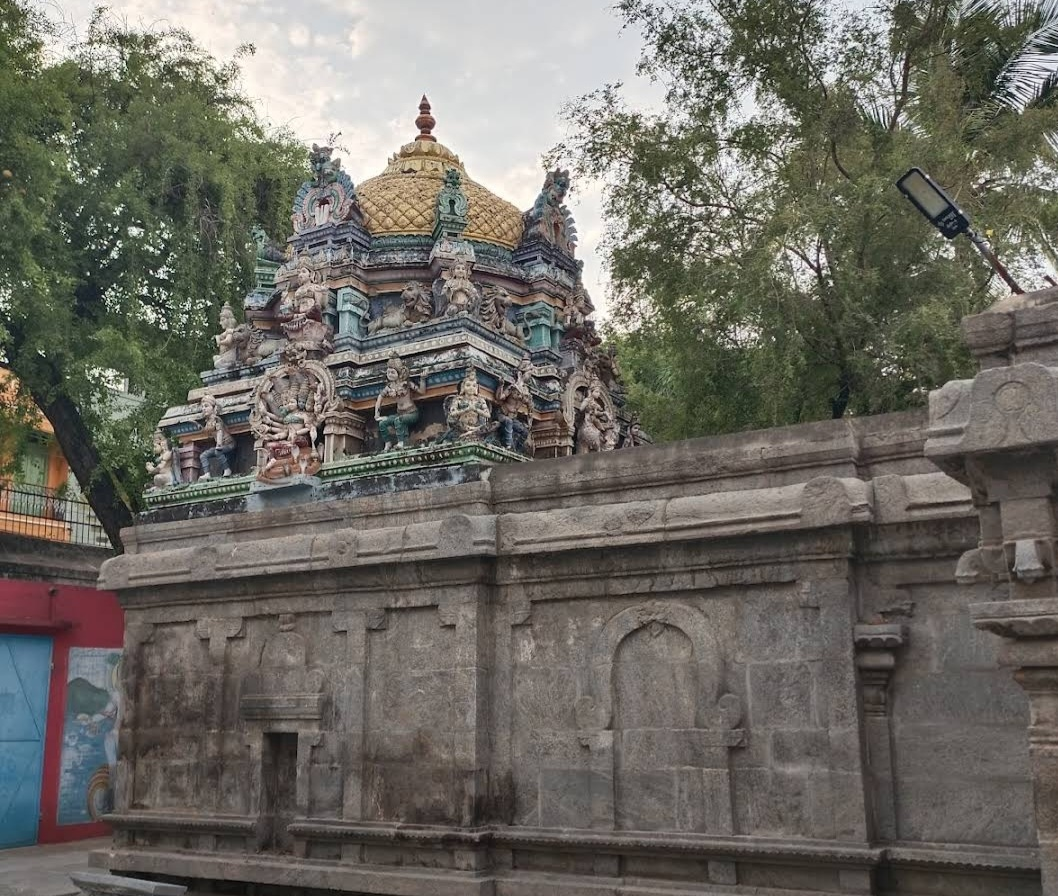
Sundaravalli Thayar's Vimanam
