= Salem Steel Plant =

Steel plant in Tamil Nadu, India

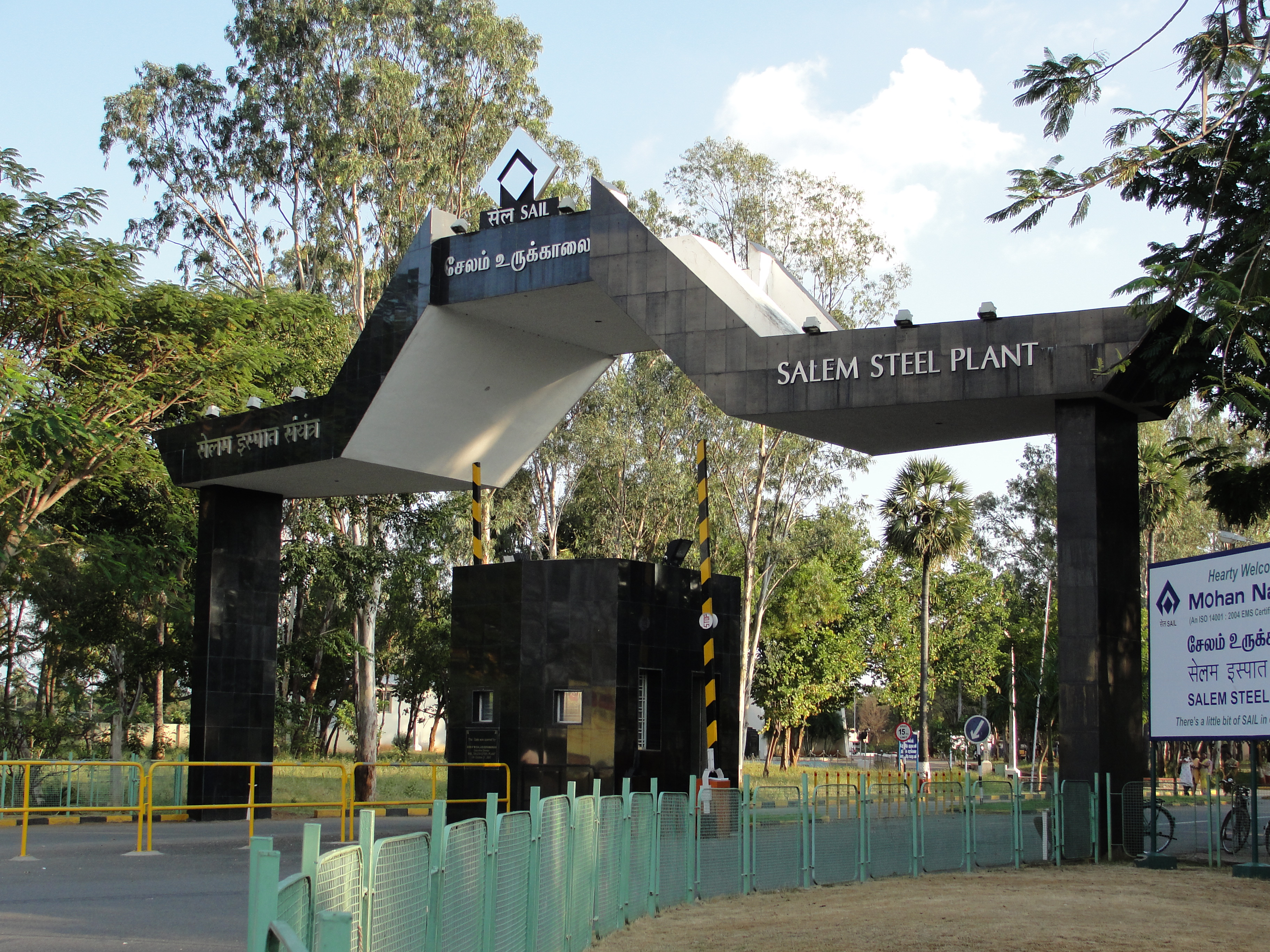
- Entrance of the plant
- Industry: Steel
- Founded: 13 September 1981; 44 years ago
- Headquarters: Salem, Tamil Nadu, India
- Products: Hot-rolled stainless steel; Cold-rolled stainless steel
- Owner: SAIL
- Number of employees: 1,357
- Website: Official website

Salem Steel Plant (SSP), a unit of Steel Authority of India Limited (SAIL), is a steel plant involved in the production of stainless steel. It is located along the Salem — Bangalore National Highway 44 in the foothills of Kanjamalai in Salem district, Tamil Nadu, India. The plant, not only has an installed capacity of 70,000 tonnes per annum in its cold rolling mill and 3,64,000 tonnes per annum in the hot rolling mill., but it also has the country's first stainless steel blanking facility.

== History ==
On 15 May 1972, the Government of India decided to set up a steel plant at Salem for the production of steel and strips of electrical, stainless and other special and mild steel. The construction started on 13 June 1972, after inauguration by then Minister of Steel and Mines Mohan Kumara Mangalam. The cost of first phase of the project was ₹181.19 crore (US$19 million). It brought the latest technology in cold rolling to India at the time. The initial production capacity was 32,000 tones per annum (cold rolled stainless steel strips and wide sheets).

Later on 26 March 1991, the second phase at a cost of ₹76.27 crore (US$8.0 million) was realized, increasing production capacity to 70,000 tones per annum. On 24 December 1993, a blanking line was commissioned with a capacity of 3600 tones Bar stock blanks per annum. This was the first such facility to be established in India.

== Production ==
=== Production facilities ===
The major facilities at the plant include

- Steel Melting Shop
- Cold Rolling Mill Complex
- Hot Rolling Mill Complex
- Stainless Steel Blanking Line

SSP specializes in the production of cold rolled stainless steel in the form of coils and sheets. The raw materials are imported and also supplied by Alloy Steel Plant in Durgapur. The steel melting shop's annual capacity is 1,80,000 tonnes of slabs per annum. The hot-rolling mill and cold-rolling mill have capacities of 3,64,000 and 66,600 tonnes per annum respectively.

SSP supplies steel to BHEL-Tiruchirapalli, HMT, Bharat Electronics Limited-Bangalore and Indian Telephone Industries. Stainless steel is also exported to over more than 37 countries including Spain, UK, Japan, Germany and Switzerland. Between 1994 and 1995, around 41,500 tonnes to as many as 27 countries.

== Achievements ==
The units of cold rolling mill complex was ISO 9002 certified in April 1993. The hot rolling mill complex received certification two years later. It received ISO 14001 certification, for its pollution free environment, from German RWTÜV in 1999.

=== Awards ===
- SAIL Corporate Award 1994-95
- Annual Safety Awards at Visakhapatnam – Ispat Suraksha Puraskar award
- Ferrous Division of Indian Institute of Metals – National Sustainability Award 2007
