= Karumandurai =

Small developed village in Tamil Nadu, India

Karumandurai Chinna Kalvarayan Hills or Karumanthurai
- Village
- Karumandurai
- Location in Tamil Nadu, India Karumandurai (India)
- Coordinates: 11.8261°N 78.6271°E
- Country: India
- State: Tamil Nadu
- District: Salem
- Named for: Surrounding areas headquarter

Government
  - Type: Panchayat

Area
  - Total: 2 km^{2} (0.77 sq mi)
- Demonym: Karumanduraiyan

Languages
  - Official: Tamil
- Time zone: UTC+5:30 (IST)
- PIN: 636 138
- Telephone code: 04292
- Vehicle registration: TN-77

Karumandurai is a village in Pethanaickenpalayam taluk in the Salem district, Tamil Nadu, India. The town and surrounding villages are colloquially called Kalrayan Hills, which are further divided into Chinna Kalrayan and Periya Kalrayan Hills. This fruit orchards 2nd largest in South Asia around 1054 acres.

== Economy ==
The main source of income of the village is from agriculture, including the cultivation of sugar cane, tapioca, vegetables (tomato, cabbage, beetroot, carrot), rice paddy, pearl millet, finger millet, kodo millet, horticulture, livestock, pepper and coffee.

== Tourism ==
It is situated around 65 km from Salem and of those, 10 km are hilly road. However, the town itself is located in relatively flat terrain. Kallakuruchi is around 50 km from the village. Tourist spots on the way to Kallakuruchi are some small lake with boats for tourists and two waterfalls, Periyar and Megan.
