= Administration of Salem district =

Local government in Tamil Nadu, India

Local government in Salem comprises three tiers of administration in the west district of Tamil Nadu, below the central government of India. Salem district was the first district created in India.

Salem district consists of one municipal corporation, seven municipalities and 33 town panchayats.

== Municipal corporation ==
There is one corporation in Salem district, namely Salem City Municipal Corporation.

Larger cities of Tamil Nadu are governed by city municipal corporations (Tamil: மாநகராட்சிகள்). This city alone houses one-third of the urban population of the state. The Corporation consists of a council of elected councillors from each ward and a presiding officer, the Mayor, who is also an elected representative. Apart from them, an executive authority referred as Corporation Commissioner is also vested with administrative powers.

== Municipalities ==
There are six municipalities in Salem district.

- Attur
- Mettur
- Edappadi
- Narasingapuram
- Edaganasalai
- Tharamangalam
- Sangagiri

Municipalities (Tamil: நகராட்சிகள்) fall next to the city corporations. Municipalities have four categories based on their annual income and population. These include special-grade municipalities, selection-grade municipalities, grade I and grade II municipalities. Their elected representatives include ward councillors and a presiding officer, Municipal Chairperson. The Municipal Commissioner is the executive authority.

== Town panchayats ==
There are 33 town panchayats in Salem district.

- Arasiramani
- Ayothiapattinam
- Attayampatti
- Belur (Thiruvelviyur(a) Belur)
- Elampillai
- Ethapur (Yethapur)
- Gangavalli
- Jalakandapuram
- Kadayampatti
- Kannankurichi
- Karuppur
- Keeripatti
- Kolathur
- Konganapuram
- Mallur
- Mecheri
- Nangavalli
- Omalur
- P. N. Patti
- Panaimarathupatti
- Pethanaickenpalayam
- Poolampatti
- Sentharapatti
- Thalaivasal
- Thammampatti
- Thedavur
- Thevur
- Vanavasi
- Vazhapadi
- Veeraganur
- Veerakkalpudur
- Yercaud
- Manivilundhan

Town panchayat (Tamil: பேரூராட்சிகள்) is the body of government for areas in transition form ‘rural’ to ‘urban’. Tamil Nadu is the first state to introduce such a classification in urban local bodies. The state has 561 town panchayats. Town panchayats are upgraded to Grade III municipalities if they are found to be eligible. They are categorised in a similar way to that of Municipalities depending on the income criteria and population. Town panchayat councils include elected ward councillors and their presiding officer, Town panchayat chairperson. The Executive Officer is the executive authority for town panchayats.

== Elections ==
Elections to the local bodies in Tamil Nadu, held once in five years, are conducted by Tamil Nadu State Election Commission. Both direct and indirect elections apply for local bodies. Direct election posts include:

- Urban bodies
1. Corporation Mayor
2. Municipality/Town Panchayat Chairperson
3. Corporation/Municipality/Town Panchayat Councillor
- Rural bodies
1. Village Panchayat President
2. District Panchayat councillor
3. Panchayat Union councillor
4. Village Panchayat Ward Member

Indirect election posts include Chairpersons of District panchayats and Panchayat unions, Deputy Mayor of corporations, Vice-Chairpersons of Municipalities and Town panchayats. Various statutory/standing committees are also elected by the way of indirect elections.

== Village panchayats ==
There are 385 village panchayats of 20 blocks in Salem district.

1. Thalaivasal Block
1	1 Aragalur
2	2 Arathi Agraharam
3	3 Deviyakurichi
4	4 East Rajapalayam
5	5 Govindampalayam
6	6 Iluppanatham
7	7 Kamakkapalayam
8	8 Kattukottai
9	9 Kavarpanai
10	10 Ladduvadi
11	11 Manivilundan
12	12 Navakurichi
13	13 Navalur
14	14 Pagadapady
15	15 Pattuthurai
16	16 Periyeri
17	17 Puliankurichi
18	18 Punavasal
19	19 Puthur
20	20 Sadasivapuram
21	21 Sarvoy
22	22 Sarvoy Pudur
23	23 Sathappady
24	24 Siruvachur
25	25 Sitheri
26	26 Thalaivasal
27	27 Thenkumarai
28	28 Thittacheri
29	29 Thiyaganur
30	30 Unathur
31	31 Vadakumarai
32	32 Varagur
33	33 Vellaiyur
34	34 Veppampoondi
35	35 Veppanatham

2. Attur Block
36	1 Akkichettipalayam
37	2 Ammampalayam
38	3 Appamasamudram Salem
39	4 Arasanatham
40	5 Chokkanathapuram
41	6 Eachampatty
42	7 Kallanatham
43	8 Kalpaganur
44	9 Koolamedu
45	10 Kothampadi
46	11 Malliakarai
47	12 Manjini
48	13 Paithur
49	14 Pungavadi
50	15 Ramanaickenpalayam
51	16 Seeliampatty
52	17 Thandavarayapuram
53	18 Thennakudipalayam
54	19 Thulukanur
55	20 Valaiyamadevi

3. Gangavalli Block
56	1 Anaiyampatti
57	2 Belur
58	3 Goodamalai
59	4 Jangamasamudram
60	5 Kadambur
61	6 Kondayampalli
62	7 Krishnapuram
63	8 Manmalai
64	9 Naduvalur
65	10 Nagiyampatti
66	11 Odhiyathur
67	12 Pachamalai
68	13 Thagarapudur
69	14 Ulipuram

4. Pethanaickenpalayam Block
70	1 A. Karadipatti
71	2 A. Komarapalayam
72	3 Ariyapalayam
73	4 B. Karadipatti
74	5 C. Kalrayan Therkku Nadu
75	6 C. Kalrayan Vadakku Nadu
76	7 Chinnakrishnapuram
77	8 Dhalavaipatti
78	9 Edayapatti
79	10 Gopalapuram
80	11 Kalarampatti
81	12 Kalleiripatti
82	13 Kalyanaigiri
83	14 Kottavadi
84	15 M. Udayampalayam
85	16 Muthagoundanoor
86	17 Oddapatti
87	18 Olappadi
88	19 P. Kalrayan Hills Keelnadu
89	20 P. Kalrayan Hills Melnadu
90	21 Palaniyapuri
91	22 Panamadal
92	23 Pappinaickenpatti
93	24 Periyakrishnapuram
94	25 Puthiragoundampalayam
95	26 Sekkadipatti
96	27 Thamayanur
97	28 Thandanur
98	29 Thennampillaiyur
99	30 Thumbal
100	31 Umayalpuram
101	32 Vadugathampatti
102	33 Vaithigoundanpudur
103	34 Veeragoundanoor
104	35 Vellalapatti
105	36 West Rajapalayam

5. Valapady Block
106	1 Athanurpatti
107	2 Chandrapillaivalasu
108	3 Chinnamanaickenpalayam
109	4 Kattuveppilaipatti
110	5 Kolathukombai
111	6 Komarapalayam
112	7 Kurichi
113	8 Mannaickenpatti
114	9 Mannarpalayam
115	10 Muthampatti
116	11 Neermullikuttai
117	12 Ponnarampatti
118	13 Puzhuthikuttai
119	14 Singipuram
120	15 Somampatti
121	16 Thekkalpatti
122	17 Thirumanur
123	18 Thukkiyampalayam
124	19 Veppilaipatti
125	20 Vilaripalayam

6. Ayothiyapattinam Block
126	1 A. N. Mangalam
127	2 Achankuttapatty
128	3 Adhikaripatti
129	4 Aladipatti
130	5 Anupur
131	6 Chinnagoundapuram
132	7 Chinnanur
133	8 D. Perumapalayam
134	9 Dasanaickenpatti
135	10 Karipatti
136	11 Karumapuram
137	12 Kootathupatti
138	13 Korathupatti
139	14 Kullampatti
140	15 Kuppanur
141	16 M. Palapatti
142	17 M. Perumapalayam
143	18 M. Thathanur
144	19 Masinaickenpatti
145	20 Mettupatti
146	21 Minnampalli
147	22 Pallipatti
148	23 Periyagoundapuram
149	24 Poovanoor
150	25 S. N. Mangalam
151	26 Sukkampatti
152	27 Thailanur
153	28 Udayapatti
154	29 Valaiyakaranur
155	30 Valasaiyur
156	31 Veeranam
157	32 Vellalagundam

7. Yercaud Block
158	1 Manjakuttai
159	2 Maramangalam
160	3 Nagalur
161	4 Semmanatham
162	5 Thalaisolai
163	6 Vazhavanthi
164	7 Vellakkadai
165	8 Velur
166	9 Yercaud

8. Salem Block
167	1 Andipatti
168	2 Ayyamperumampatti
169	3 Chettichavadi
170	4 Dhalavaipatti
171	5 Erumapalayam
172	6 Inamvedugathampatti
173	7 Kondappanaickenpatti
174	8 Majaragollapatti
175	9 Mallamoopampatti
176	10 Sanyasigundu
177	11 Sarkargollapatti
178	12 Selathampatti
179	13 Thirumalaigiri
180	14 Vattamuthampatti

9. Panamarathupatti Block
181	1 Amani Kondalampatti
182	2 Ammapalayam
183	3 Dasanaickenpatti
184	4 Ervadivaniyampadi
185	5 Gajjalnaickenpatti
186	6 Kammalapatti
187	7 Kuralnatham
188	8 Mookkuthipalayam
189	9 Nazhikkalpatti
190	10 Neikkarapatty
191	11 Nilavarapatti
192	12 Pallitherupatti
193	13 Parapatti
194	14 Peramanur
195	15 Santhiyur
196	16 Santhiyur Attayampatty
197	17 Thammanaickenpatty
198	18 Thippampatty
199	19 Thumbalpatti
200	20 Vazhakkuttapatti

10. Veerapandi Block
201	1 Akkarapalayam
202	2 Anaikuttapatti
203	3 Ariyagoundampatti
204	4 Chennagiri
205	5 Ettimanickampatti
206	6 Inambiroji
207	7 Kadathur Agr.
208	8 Kalparapatti
209	9 Keerapappambadi
210	10 Maramangalathupatti
211	11 Marulayampalayam
212	12 Mooduthurai
213	13 Murungapatti
214	14 Pappaarapatti
215	15 Periya Seeragapadi
216	16 Perumagoundampatti
217	17 Perumampatti
218	18 Poolavari
219	19 Puthur Agr.
220	20 Rajapalayam
221	21 Rakkipatti
222	22 Senaipalayam
223	23 Uthamasolapuram
224	24 Veerapandi
225	25 Vembadithalam

11. Magundanchavadi Block
226	1 A. Pudur
227	2 Agr. Thalaiyur
228	3 Egapuram
229	4 Gudalur
230	5 Kaligoundampalayam
231	6 Kanagagiri
232	7 Kandarkulamanickam
233	8 Kannanderi
234	9 Mac. Donald Choultry
235	10 Naduvaneri
236	11 Thappakuttai
237	12 Vaikundam

12. Sankari Block
238	1 Alathur
239	2 Annathanapatti
240	3 Chinnagoundanur
241	4 Devannagoundanur
242	5 Irugalur
243	6 Iveli
244	7 Katheri
245	8 Kaveripatti
246	9 Kaveripatti Agraharam
247	10 Koneripatti
248	11 Koneripatti Agrm.
249	12 Kottavaradhampatti
250	13 Morur East
251	14 Morur West
252	15 Mottaiyanur
253	16 Olakkachinnanur
254	17 Pullagoundampatti
255	18 Pullagoundampatti Agrm.
256	19 Sanyasipatti Agraharam
257	20 Sungudivaradhampatti
258	21 Vadugapatti
259	22 Veerachipalayam

13. Konganapuram Block
260	1 Erumaipatti
261	2 Katchupalli
262	3 Konasamudram
263	4 Koranampatti
264	5 Kurumbapatti
265	6 Pudupalayam
266	7 Samudram
267	8 Thangayur
268	9 Vellalapuram

14. Edappadi Block
269	1 Adaiyur
270	2 Avaniperur East
271	3 Chettimankurichi
272	4 Chithoor
273	5 Dadhapuram
274	6 Iruppali
275	7 Nedungulam
276	8 Pakkanadu
277	9 Vellarivelli
278	10 Vembaneri

15. Kolathur Block
279	1 Alamarathupatti
280	2 Chithiraipattipudur
281	3 Dhinnapatti
282	4 Kannamoochi
283	5 Karungallur
284	6 Kaveripuram
285	7 Kolnaickenpatti
286	8 Lakkampatti
287	9 Moolakkadu
288	10 Navapatti
289	11 Palamalai
290	12 Pannavadi
291	13 Sampalli
292	14 Singiripatti

16. Mecheri Block
293	1 Amaram
294	2 Aranganoor
295	3 Banapuram
296	4 Bukkampatti
297	5 Koonandiyur
298	6 Koppampatti
299	7 Kuttapatti
300	8 M. Kalipatti
301	9 M. N. Patti
302	10 Mallikundham
303	11 Olaipatti
304	12 Pallipatti
305	13 Pottaneri
306	14 Sathapadi
307	15 Thethigiripatti
308	16 Vellar
309	17 Virudasampatti

17. Nangavalli Block
310	1 Avadathur
311	2 Chinnasoragai
312	3 Gonur
313	4 Karikkapatti
314	5 Periyasoragai
315	6 Sanarapatti
316	7 Surapalli
317	8 Thoramangalam
318	9 Veerakkal

18. Tharamangalam Block
319	1 Alagusamudram
320	2 Amaragundhi
321	3 Ariyampatti
322	4 Arurpatti
323	5 Desavilakku
324	6 Duttampatti
325	7 Edayapatti
326	8 Elavampatti
327	9 Karukkalvadi
328	10 Kurukkupatti
329	11 Mallikuttai
330	12 Manathal
331	13 Panikkanur
332	14 Pappampadi
333	15 Ramireddipatti
334	16 Selavadai
335	17 T. Konagapadi

19. Omalur Block
336	1 Balbakki
337	2 Ettikuttapatti
338	3 Gollapatti
339	4 Kamalapuram
340	5 Kottagoundampatti
341	6 Kottamariammankoil
342	7 Kottamettupatti
343	8 M. Chettipatti
344	9 Manguppai
345	10 Moogilpadi
346	11 Muthunaikenpatti
347	12 Nallagoundampatti
348	13 Naranampalayam
349	14 Pachanampatti
350	15 Pagalpatti
351	16 Periyeripatti
352	17 Pottipuram
353	18 Puliampatti
354	19 S. Chettipatti
355	20 Saminaikenpatti
356	21 Sangeethapatti
357	22 Sellapillaikuttai
358	23 Semmankoodal
359	24 Sikkampatti
360	25 Sikkanampatti
361	26 Thathiyampatti
362	27 Thekkampatti
363	28 Thindamangalam
364	29 Tholasampatti
365	30 Thumbipadi
366	31 U. Maramangalam
367	32 Vellakkalpatti
368	33 Vellalapatti

20. Kadayampatti Block
369	1 Bommiyampatti
370	2 Danishpet
371	3 Deevattipatti
372	4 Dharapuram
373	5 Gundakkal
374	6 Kanavaipudur
375	7 Kanjanaickenpatti
376	8 Karuvalli Salem
377	9 Kongupatti
378	10 Kookkuttapatti
379	11 Mookkanur
380	12 Nadupatti
381	13 Pannapatti
382	14 Poosaripatti
383	15 Semmandapatti
384	16 Umblikkampatti
385	17 Veppilai

== Functions ==
Local bodies are completely responsible for the developmental administration in the state. Maintenance of clean environment, primary health facilities gain the foremost importance. Apart from them water supply, roads and buildings, storm-water drains, street lighting, solid waste management, sanitation and bus-stands cum commercial complexes etc are the prime duties of the local bodies.[19] Centrally sponsored schemes like Mahatma Gandhi National Rural Employment Guarantee Scheme (MGNREGS), Indira Awaas Yojana (IAY), Member of Parliament Local Area Development Scheme (MPLADS), etc, and State-funded Schemes like Tamil Nadu Village Habitation Improvement Scheme (THAI), Member of Legislative Assembly Constituency Development Scheme (MLACDS), Self-Sufficiency Scheme, Solar-Powered Green-House Scheme are also undertaken by the local bodies.[20] Sources of revenue for these local bodies are mainly from central and state governments. Local bodies also have the power of taxation which include house tax, profession tax, property tax etc. Apart from these they levy fees for specific building plan and layout approvals, water charges, sewerage charges etc.
