= Doramangalam =

- Town
- Location in Tamil Nadu, India Doramangalam (India)
- Coordinates: 11°41′51″N 77°53′23″E
- Country: India
- State: Tamil Nadu
- District: Salem
- Taluk: Mettur

Area
  - Total: 6.33 km^{2} (2.44 sq mi)

Population (2011)
  - Total: 5,322
  - Density: 841/km^{2} (2,180/sq mi)
- Time zone: UTC+5:30 (IST)

Doramangalam is a census town in the Mettur taluk of Salem District, in Tamil Nadu, India.

== Geography ==
Doramangalam is within Mettur taluk, which is in the northwestern part of Salem District. It covers 6.33 square kilometres (2.44 sq mi) of land in the southern part of the taluk, near the border with Idappadi and Omalur taluks. It is located 13 kilometres (8.1 mi) southeast of Mettur, the taluk headquarters, 28 kilometres (17 mi) west of Salem, the district headquarters, and 300 kilometres (190 mi) southwest of the state capital of Chennai. Nearby towns include Avadattur and Jalakandapuram.

== Demographics ==
In 2011 Doramangalam had a population of 5,322 people. 2,810 (52.8%) of the inhabitants were male, while 2,512 (47.2%) were female. 497 children in the town, about 9% of the population, were at or below the age of 6. The literacy rate in the town was 58.5%. Scheduled Castes and Scheduled Tribes accounted for 8.1% and 0% of the population, respectively.
