= Gangavalli block =

Gangavalli block is a revenue block in the Salem district of Tamil Nadu, India. It has a total of 14 panchayat villages. They are:

1. Anaiyampatti
2. Belur
3. Goodamalai
4. Jangamasamudram
5. Kadambur
6. Kondayampalli
7. Krishnapuram
8. Manmalai
9. Naduvalur
10. Nagiyampatti
11. Othiyathur
12. Pachamalai
13. Thagarapudur
14. Ulipuram
