= Kavadikaranoor =

- village
- Location in Tamil Nadu, India Kavadikaranoor (India)
- Coordinates: 11.60°N 77.90°E
- Country: India
- State: Tamil Nadu
- District: Salem

Government
  - MLA: Edappady K Palanisamy ADMK
- Elevation: 239 m (784 ft)

Population (2001)
  - Total: 1,812

Languages
  - Official: Tamil
- Time zone: UTC+5:30 (IST)
- PIN: 637102
- Telephone code: (91)04283
- Vehicle registration: TN 27, TN 28 AND TN 52

Kavadikaranoor (also spelt as Kavadikaranur) is a village of Edappadi taluk in Salem district in the state of Tamil Nadu, India. Adjacent to Konganapuram a well known raw cotton cultivation market (TCMS) in Tamil Nadu. The economy is diversified. It is the largest village in the area of Thangayur and Kurumbapatti panchayats. The rocks deposited in western Kavadikaranoor are expected to contain rare minerals and much granite ore. A number of stone quarrying companies have been here for more than 30 years.

== Geography ==
Kavadikaranoor is located at . It has an average elevation of 298 m (978 ft). It is situated at the east basin of the hill called 'Sooriya malai'(Mountain of Sun). The epic says, the Panja Pandavas resided at the top of the hill during the first year of their 14 years forest living. Still this mountain does not have any plants due to its rocky and unusual properties. The research done by a Periyar University geologist found they contained rare radioactive minerals. The village has a beautiful viewpoint named 'Koonamori' (A bridge with dangerous turns) to see the nearest town Edappadi. Aachampalli yeri (lake) is located in the north-eastern part and provides irrigation to nearby areas.

== Location ==
Located 6 km in front of Idappadi and 3 km behind Konganapuram in Salem district. Spread over an area of 9.77 km^{2}. With a population of 1,812 As of 2001 India census, the economy of the village revolves around agriculture, truck and heavy truck transports.

== Temple ==
Lord Vishnu is placed in this village with most famous in and around area named as Sri Paali Perumal Temple. The main festival seasons are October and April. On the 4th Saturday of Purattasi Tamil month ie: Purattasi Sani or Tirumala Shanivaralu more than 20,000 people worship.

== Climate ==
The climate in Kavadikaranoor is hot in summer and mildly cooler climate in winter. The monsoon rain starts around October to November. May, June will be windy and summer rainy season starts.

== Demographics ==
The people are mostly Kongu Vellala Gounder. Other community people are also present in small numbers. Residents co-exist peacefully.

Kavadikaranoor had a population of 1,812. Males constitute 72% of the population and females 63% and an average literacy rate of 68%, higher than the national average of 59.5%.

== Education ==
Panchayat Union Elementary School in Kavadikaranoor had started in 1957, also been an education center for Indian Adult Education Association to educate the rural adults at the time of '60s to '70s.

Near by pupils admit schools are:

- K A Nachiyappa Higher Secondary School, Konganapuram
- Government Higher Secondary School for Boys, Idappadi
- Amala Educational Institutions, Morasapatti, Idappadi
- A G N Matriculation School, Konganapuram
- P S G Matriculation School, Sankagiri
- Akash Vidhya Bhavan Matriculation School, Varathankatanoor
- Royal International School (CBSC), Komarapalayam
- Universal Matriculation School, Konagkuttaiyur
