= Uthangarai taluk =

Uthangarai Taluk
- Taluk
- Location in Tamil Nadu, India
- Coordinates: 12.26°N 78.53°E
- Country: India
- State: Tamil Nadu
- District: Krishnagiri

Languages
  - Official: Tamil
- Time zone: UTC+5:30 (IST)
- PIN: 635 207
- Telephone code: (91)4341
- Vehicle registration: TN-24

Uthangarai taluk is a rural taluk of Krishnagiri district of the Indian state of Tamil Nadu. The headquarters is the town of Uthangarai.

== Areas in the taluk ==
There is one town, the headquarters panchayat town of Uthangarai, and 182 villages in Uthangarai taluk, with the largest village being Thandiyappanoor with a 2011 census population of 2240. The villages are:

- Ammaiyampatti
- Ammankovilpathi
- Anandur
- Andipatty
- Andiyur
- Appinaickenpatti
- Arunapathi
- Athipadi
- Athiveereyampatti
- Badadasampatti
- Badapalli
- Badavanur
- Bommadasampatti
- Bommampatti
- Boorgalapalli
- Chandrapatti
- Chavadiyur
- Chennappanaickanur
- Chinnakunnathur
- Chinnathallapadi
- Chinnathgarapadi
- Dasampatti
- Egoor
- Elachyur
- Elavambadi
- Ettipatti I
- Ettipatti II
- Gangapirampatti
- Gendiganur
- Genginaickenpatti
- Gerigepally
- Giddampatti
- Gollapatti I
- Gollapatti II
- Goonampatti
- Govindapuram
- Gullampatti
- Gurugapatti
- Hanumantheertham
- Illuppaikuttapatti
- Kadavani
- Kadirampatti
- Kalluganur
- Kaludaipatti
- Kamakshipatti
- Kanakkampatti
- Kanampatti
- Kanganur
- Kanichi
- Kanjanur
- Karapattu
- Kariaperumalvalasai
- Karukkampatti
- Karumandapathi
- Kattanur
- Katteri
- Kattupatti
- Kattusingiripatti
- Kedagaranur
- Keelmathur
- Keelkuppam
- Kethunaickampatti
- Kiddampatti
- Kolinaickanpatti
- Kollanaikanoor
- Kollapatti
- Kommampattu
- Konapatti
- Kondampatti
- Kottapathy
- Kottarapatti
- Kottukarampatti
- Kullaganapalli
- Kullampathy
- Kumarampatty
- Kungilipatti
- Kunnathur
- Kuppanatham
- Kursampatti
- Kurubaravalasai
- Kurukkapatti
- Lakkampatti
- Maganurpatti
- Mallampatti
- Mallapuram
- Mallupatti
- Mannadipatti
- Marampatti
- Mettuthangal
- Meyyandapatti
- Mittapalli
- Moondrampatti
- Moongileri
- Mottur
- Muchilikuttai
- Mukkarampalli
- Murukkanthal
- Murungipatti
- Muthampatti
- Nadupatti I
- Nadupatti II
- Nagalpatti
- Naickanur
- Naiperampatti
- Nallavampatti
- Naralepalle
- Narasampatti
- Nochipatti
- Obakkavalasai
- Obilinaickanpatti
- Oddapatti I
- Oddapatti II
- Olaipatti
- Onnagarai I
- Onnagarai II
- Pachinampatti
- Padadasampatti
- Palaiakottai
- Pallathur
- Panamarathupatti
- Papparapatti I
- Papparapatti II
- Pappichettipatti
- Patlankottai
- Parasanur
- Pasandi
- Pavakkal
- Periathallapadi
- Periyakottakulam
- Perumalkuppam
- Perumalnaickempatti
- Peyanur
- Podar
- Ponnagarapatti
- Poovampatti
- Potharajanpatti
- Pudupatti
- Pudur I
- Pudur II
- Pudur III
- Puliyampatti
- Puliyampatti
- Puliyanur
- Pullavadampadi
- Punganai
- Pusampatti
- Ramakrishnampathy
- Reddipatti I
- Reddipatti II
- Reddivalasai
- Rendathampatti
- Salamarathupatti
- Samakavandanvalasai
- Samalpatti
- Selakarampatti
- Sengalpatti
- Singarapettai
- Solakkapatti
- Sorakkapatti
- Sulakarai
- Tagaratti
- Thannirpandal
- Thathanur
- Thathinayakkanpatti
- Theerthagirivalasai
- Thippampatti
- Thiruvanapatti
- Thurinjipatti
- Thandiyappanoor Main @Uthangarai
- Umaikavandampatti
- Umaiyanur
- Upparapatti

UTHANGARAI

- Vaduganur
- Vannampatty
- Vathiyanur
- Vedapatti
- Veerachikupam
- Veeranakuppam
- Veeriampatti
- Velampatti
- Vellalapatti I
- Vellalapatti II
- Vengadathampatti
- Venkatapuram
- Veppalampatti

== Demographics ==
According to the 2011 census, the taluk of Uthangarai had a population of 212,970 with 109,567 males and 103,403 females. There were 944 women for every 1,000 men. The taluk had a literacy rate of 64.73%. Child population in the age group below 6 years were 11,480 Males and 10,247 Females.
