= Alamarathupatti (disambiguation) =

- Alamarathupatti village in Virudunagar district
- Alamarathupatty village in Dindigul district
- Alamarathupatti, a village in Kolathur block in Salem district
