= Ethapur =

Ethapur Yethapur
- Panchayat town
- Location in Tamil Nadu, India
- Coordinates: 11.6667°N 78.4833°E
- Country: India
- State: Tamil Nadu
- District: Salem

Area
  - Total: 8 km^{2} (3.1 sq mi)

Population (2011)
  - Total: 10,968
  - Density: 1,400/km^{2} (3,600/sq mi)

Languages
  - Official: Tamil
- Time zone: UTC+5:30 (IST)

Ethapur or Yethapur is a panchayat town in Pethanaickenpalayam taluk of Salem district in the Indian state of Tamil Nadu. It is one of the 31 panchayat towns in the district. Spread across an area of 8 km^{2} (3.1 sq mi), it had a population of 10,968 individuals as per the 2011 census.

== Geography and administration ==
Ethapur is located in Pethanaickenpalayam taluk of Salem district in the Indian state of Tamil Nadu. Spread across an area of 8 km^{2} (3.1 sq mi), it is bordered by the Kalrayan Hills to the north, Pethanaickenpalayam to the east, and the villages of Puthiragoundanpalayam to the south, and Pathiyagoundanpudhur and Kalyanakiri to the west. It is one of the 31 panchayat towns in the district.

Ethapur is sub-divided into 15 wards distributed across two revenue villages of Ethapur and Abinavam. The town panchayat is headed by a chairperson, who is elected by the members, who are chosen through direct elections. The town forms part of the Attur Assembly constituency that elects its member to the Tamil Nadu legislative assembly and the Kallakurichi Lok Sabha constituency that elects its member to the Parliament of India.

== Demographics ==
As per the 2011 census, Ethapur had a population of 10,968 individuals across 2,866 households. The population saw a marginal increase compared to the previous census in 2001 when 10,058 inhabitants were registered. The population consisted of 3,547 males and 3,674 females. About 966 individuals were below the age of six years. About 19% of the population belonged to scheduled castes and 3.3% belonged to scheduled tribes. The entire population is classified as urban. The town has an average literacy rate of 84.2%.

About 41.9% of the eligible population were employed, of which majority were involved in agriculture and allied activities. Hinduism was the majority religion which was followed by 98.3% of the population, with Christianity (0.7%) and Islam (1%) being minor religions.
