= Veerakkalpudur =

- Panchayat town
- Location in Tamil Nadu, India
- Coordinates: 11°49′26″N 77°51′21″E
- Country: India
- State: Tamil Nadu
- District: Salem

Area
  - Total: 12.95 km^{2} (5.00 sq mi)

Population (2011)
  - Total: 16,665
  - Density: 1,287/km^{2} (3,333/sq mi)

Languages
  - Official: Tamil
- Time zone: UTC+5:30 (IST)

Veerakkalpudur is a panchayat town in Mettur taluk of Salem district in the Indian state of Tamil Nadu. It is one of the 31 panchayat towns in the district. Spread across an area of 12.95 km^{2} (5.00 sq mi), it had a population of 16,665 individuals as per the 2011 census.

== Geography and administration ==
Veerakkalpudur is located in Mettur taluk of Salem district in the Indian state of Tamil Nadu. It is one of the 31 panchayat towns in the district. Spread across an area of 12.95 km^{2} (5.00 sq mi), it is located about 11 km (6.8 mi) from Mettur along the road connecting it with Nangavalli.

The town panchayat is sub-divided into 15 wards. It is headed by a chairperson, who is elected by the members, who are chosen through direct elections. The town forms part of the Mettur Assembly constituency that elects its member to the Tamil Nadu legislative assembly and the Dharmapuri Lok Sabha constituency that elects its member to the Parliament of India.

== Demographics ==
As per the 2011 census, Veerakkalpudur had a population of 16,665 individuals across 4,614 households. The population saw a marginal increase compared to the previous census in 2001 when 16,424 inhabitants were registered. The population consisted of 8,451 males and 8,214 females. About 1,511 individuals were below the age of six years. About 6.7% of the population belonged to scheduled castes. The entire population is classified as urban. The town has an average literacy rate of 87.2%.

About 38% of the eligible population were employed full-time, of which majority were involved in agriculture and allied activities. Hinduism was the majority religion which was followed by 96.7% of the population, with Christianity (1.8%) and Islam (1.5%) making up the rest.
