= Attur block =

Attur block is a revenue block in the Salem district of Tamil Nadu, India. It has a total of 20 panchayat villages. They are:

1. Akkichettipalayam
2. Ammampalayam
3. Appamasamudram Salem
4. Arasanatham
5. Chokkanathapuram
6. Eachampatty
7. Kallanatham
8. Kalpaganur
9. Koolamedu
10. Kothampadi
11. Malliakarai
12. Manjini
13. Paithur
14. Pungavadi
15. Ramanaickenpalayam
16. Seeliampatty
17. Thandavarayapuram
18. Thennakudipalayam
19. Thulukanur
20. Valaiyamadevi
