= Chokkanathapuram =

Chokkanathapuram may refer to:

- Chokkanathapuram, Kerala
- Chokkanathapuram, Salem district, Tamil Nadu
- Chokkanathapuram (Sivaganga), Tamil Nadu
- Chokkanathapuram, Thanjavur, Tamil Nadu
- Chokkanathapuram, Tiruchirappalli, Tamil Nadu
