= Idappadi taluk =

Coordinates: 11.58°N 77.85°E

Edappadi is a taluk of Salem district in the Indian state of Tamil Nadu. The administrative centre is the town of Edappadi. The taluk contains two panchayat towns, Konganapuram and Poolampatti, and ten panchayat villages. The Edappadi revenue block is coterminous with the taluk.

Brick manufacturing is prevalent in Pakkandu panchayat which is famous for its red soil. The rock deposited area of western Kavadikaranoor village is famous for granite quarries.

The taluk has a considerable migrating population that comes in to cut the sugarcane crop. Crops in the area are mostly rainfed except for irrigation in Nedungulam panchayat which lies on the banks of Cauvery River. Sarabanga is a river flowing through Edappadi leads to a lake.

In the 1800s major and wealthy community in the edappadi town was Chettiar community. Majority of meenavar community people migrated to Edappadi town from nearby villages and distant villages as well during 1900s. Now, most of the people in the taluk belong to the meenavar and Vanniyar and Kongu Vellalar and some notable Chettiar community. The taluk also has sizeable count of Adi Dravidar and some other people also with brotherhood relation.

The chairman of the panchayat union council in 2012 was Thiru A. Madhes.

== Demographics ==
According to the 2011 census, the taluk of Edappadi had a population of 222,856 with 116,241 males and 106,615 females. There were 917 women for every 1000 men. The taluk had a literacy rate of 57.03. The child population in the age group below 6 was 10,962 males and 9,755 females.

== Villages ==
The ten panchayat villages of Edappadi taluk are:

- Adaiyur
- Avaniperur East
- Chettimankurichi
- Chithoor (Chittur)
- Dadhapuram (Dadapuram)
- Iruppali
- Nedungulam
- Pakkanadu
- Vellarivelli
- Vembaneri

Other villages include:

- Erumaipatti
- Idupali
- Kachchippalli
- Konasamudram
- Koranampatti
- Kurumbapatti
- Pakkanadu R.F.
- Puduppalayam
- Samudram
- Thangayur
- Vellalapuram
