= Poolampatti =

- Panchayat town
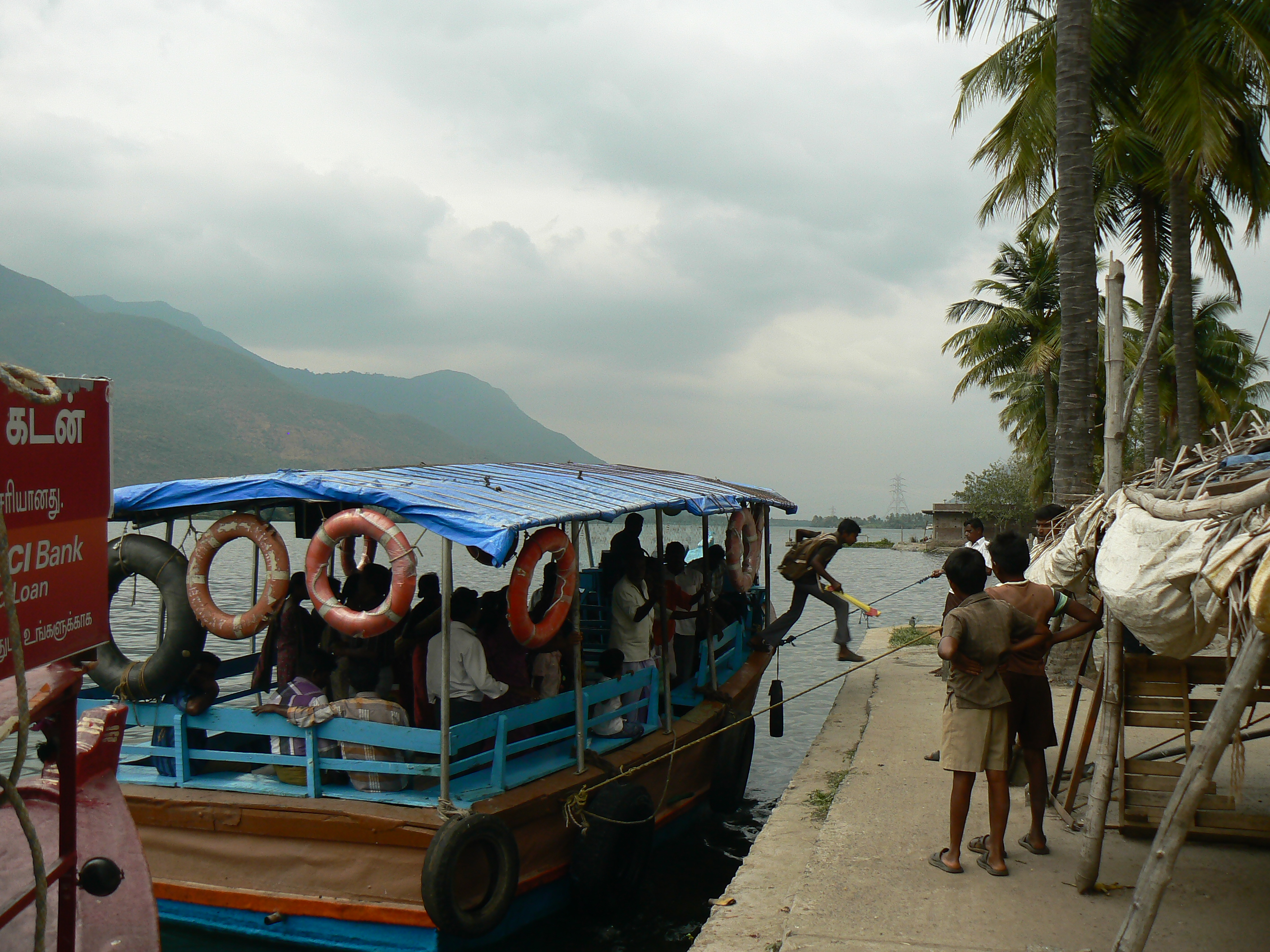

- Location in Tamil Nadu, India
- Coordinates: 11°39′12″N 77°46′23″E
- Country: India
- State: Tamil Nadu
- District: Salem

Area
  - Total: 8 km^{2} (3.1 sq mi)

Population (2011)
  - Total: 9,477
  - Density: 1,200/km^{2} (3,100/sq mi)

Languages
  - Official: Tamil
- Time zone: UTC+5:30 (IST)

Poolampatti is a panchayat town in Idappadi taluk of Salem district in the Indian state of Tamil Nadu. It is one of the 31 panchayat towns in the district. Spread across an area of 8 km^{2} (3.1 sq mi), it had a population of 9,477 individuals as per the 2011 census.

== Geography and administration ==
Poolampatti is located in Idappadi taluk of Salem district in the Indian state of Tamil Nadu. It is one of the 31 panchayat towns in the district. Spread across an area of 8 km^{2} (3.1 sq mi), it is located on the highway connecting Salem and Edappadi, about 49 km (30 mi) from Salem, and 12 km (7.5 mi) from Edappadi.

The town panchayat is sub-divided into 15 wards. It is headed by a chairperson, who is elected by the members, who are chosen through direct elections. The town forms part of the Edappadi Assembly constituency that elects its member to the Tamil Nadu legislative assembly and the Salem Lok Sabha constituency that elects its member to the Parliament of India.

== Demographics ==
As per the 2011 census, Poolampatti had a population of 9,477 individuals across 2,698 households. The population saw a marginal increase compared to the previous census in 2001 when 8,999 inhabitants were registered. The population consisted of 4,769 males and 4,708 females. About 799 individuals were below the age of six years. About 19.6% of the population belonged to scheduled castes. The entire population is classified as urban. The town has an average literacy rate of 67.3%.

About 57% of the eligible population were employed, of which majority were involved in agriculture and allied activities. Hinduism was the majority religion which was followed by 97.8% of the population, with Christianity (1.9%) and Islam (0.1%) being minor religions.
