= P. N. Patti =

- Panchayat town
- Location in Tamil Nadu, India
- Coordinates: 11°48′00″N 77°50′21″E
- Country: India
- State: Tamil Nadu
- District: Salem

Area
  - Total: 39.36 km^{2} (15.20 sq mi)

Population (2011)
  - Total: 25,133
  - Density: 638.5/km^{2} (1,654/sq mi)

Languages
  - Official: Tamil
- Time zone: UTC+5:30 (IST)

P. N. Patti is a panchayat town in Mettur taluk of Salem district in the Indian state of Tamil Nadu. It is one of the 31 panchayat towns in the district. Spread across an area of 39.36 km^{2} (15.20 sq mi), it had a population of 25,133 individuals as per the 2011 census.

== Geography and administration ==
P. N. Patti is located in Mettur taluk of Salem district in the Indian state of Tamil Nadu. Spread across an area of 39.36 km^{2} (15.20 sq mi), it is one of the 31 panchayat towns in the district. The town panchayat is headed by a chairperson, who is elected by the members, who are chosen through direct elections. The town forms part of the Mettur Assembly constituency that elects its member to the Tamil Nadu legislative assembly and the Dharmapuri Lok Sabha constituency that elects its member to the Parliament of India.

== Demographics ==
As per the 2011 census, P. N. Patti had a population of 25,133 individuals across 6,901 households. The population saw a marginal increase compared to the previous census in 2001 when 23,331 inhabitants were registered. The population consisted of 12,843 males and 12,290 females. About 2,530 individuals were below the age of six years. About 14.5% of the population belonged to scheduled castes. The entire population is classified as urban. The town has an average literacy rate of 76.4%.

About 38.5% of the eligible population were employed, of which majority were involved in agriculture and allied activities. Hinduism was the majority religion which was followed by 96.9% of the population, with Christianity (1.7%) and Islam (1.4%) being minor religions.
