= Aandiyur =

Andiyur
- Village
- Location in Tamil Nadu, India Andiyur (India)
- Coordinates: 12.353124°N 78.58351°E
- Country: India
- State: Tamil Nadu
- District: Krishnagiri
- Taluka: Uthangarai

Population (2011)
  - Total: 1,403

Languages
  - Official: Tamil
- Time zone: UTC+5:30 (IST)
- Postal code: 635307

Aandiyur Uthangarai is a village in Uthangarai taluk, Krishnagiri district, Tamil Nadu, India.

== History ==
In 1300 CE, Aandiyur was a forest inhabited only by Siddhars. Hence the place was called Siddha Madam, a name which over time evolved to become Aandi madam and eventually Aandiyur.

== Demographics ==
In the 2001 Indian census, Aandiyur had 1,979 inhabitants, 1,007 male and 972 female. For the 2001 census Uthangarai taluk, and Aandiyur, were in Dharmapuri district, as Krishnagiri district was not formed until 2004.

In the 2011 census, Aandiyur reported a decreased population of 1,403.
