= Thangayur =

- Village
- Location in Tamil Nadu, India Thangayur (India)
- Coordinates: 11.52°N 77.88°E
- Country: India
- State: Tamil Nadu
- District: Salem சேலம்
- Elevation: 218 m (715 ft)

Population (2011)
  - Total: 1,440
  - Density: 100/km^{2} (260/sq mi)

Languages
  - Official: Tamil
- Time zone: UTC+5:30 (IST)
- PIN: 637 102
- Telephone code: 91 - 4283
- Vehicle registration: TN 52

Thangayur is a village in the west of Salem District, Tamil Nadu, India.

- Nearest Post Office : Thangayur
- Occupation of people: Agriculture, road haulage
- Total Families: 250
- Nearest town: Konganapuram, Sankari
- Religion: Hindu
