= Vembaneri =

Village in India

Coordinates: 11°38′N 77°53′E

Vembaneri is an agricultural village. Vembaneri is a village panchayat located in Idappadi taluk of Salem district in Tamil Nadu. It is 35 km by road west of Salem. It comes under Idappadi legislative constituency and Salem Parliament constituency. The total population is 3542 and there are 952 houses. The female population is 45.6%.
