= Vanavasi =

- Panchayat town
- Location in Tamil Nadu, India
- Coordinates: 11.752404°N 77.878770°E
- Country: India
- State: Tamil Nadu
- District: Salem

Area
  - Total: 5.2 km^{2} (2.0 sq mi)

Population (2011)
  - Total: 7,130
  - Density: 1,400/km^{2} (3,600/sq mi)

Languages
  - Official: Tamil
- Time zone: UTC+5:30 (IST)

Vanavasi is a panchayat town in Mettur taluk of Salem district in the Indian state of Tamil Nadu. It is one of the 31 panchayat towns in the district. Spread across an area of 5.2 km^{2} (2.0 sq mi), it had a population of 7,130 individuals as per the 2011 census.

== Geography and administration ==
Vanavasi is located in Mettur taluk of Salem district in the Indian state of Tamil Nadu. It is one of the 31 panchayat towns in the district. Spread across an area of 5.2 km^{2} (2.0 sq mi), it is located about 26 km (16 mi) from Mettur.

The town panchayat was established in 1952, and was further upgraded in 1967. It consists of 12 wards, and is headed by a chairperson, who is elected by the members. The members are chosen through direct elections. The town forms part of the Edappadi Assembly constituency that elects its member to the Tamil Nadu legislative assembly and the Salem Lok Sabha constituency that elects its member to the Parliament of India.

== Demographics ==
As per the 2011 census, Vanavasi had a population of 7,130 individuals across 1,890 households. The population saw a marginal increase compared to the previous census in 2001 when 6,780 inhabitants were registered. The population consisted of 3,619 males and 3,511 females. About 603 individuals were below the age of six years. About 9.8% of the population belonged to scheduled castes. The entire population is classified as urban. The town has an average literacy rate of 78.1%.

About 49.7% of the eligible population were employed, of which majority were involved in agriculture and allied activities. Hinduism was the majority religion which was followed by 98.9% of the population, with Christianity (0.4%) and Islam (0.6%) being minor religions.
