= Marampatti =

Coordinates: 12.278922787056059°N 78.57466364004532°E

- city
- Interactive map of Marampatti
- Country: India
- State: Tamil Nadu
- District: Krishnagiri district

Population (2001)
  - Total: 1,012

Languages
  - Official: Tamil
- Time zone: UTC+5:30 (IST)
- PIN: 635207

Marampatti is a Panchayat Village in Uthangarai taluk in the Krishnagiri District of the Indian state of Tamil Nadu.

== Demographics ==
According to the 2001 Indian census, Marampatti had a population of 1,012. Males constitute 52% of the population and females 48%. Marampatti has an average literacy rate of 52%.
STD Code :04341

== Villages under Marampatti Panchayat ==
- Marampatti
- Kanampatti
- Naapirampatti
- Mallampatti

== Pambar Reservoir ==
Pambar reservoir is near Marampatti.

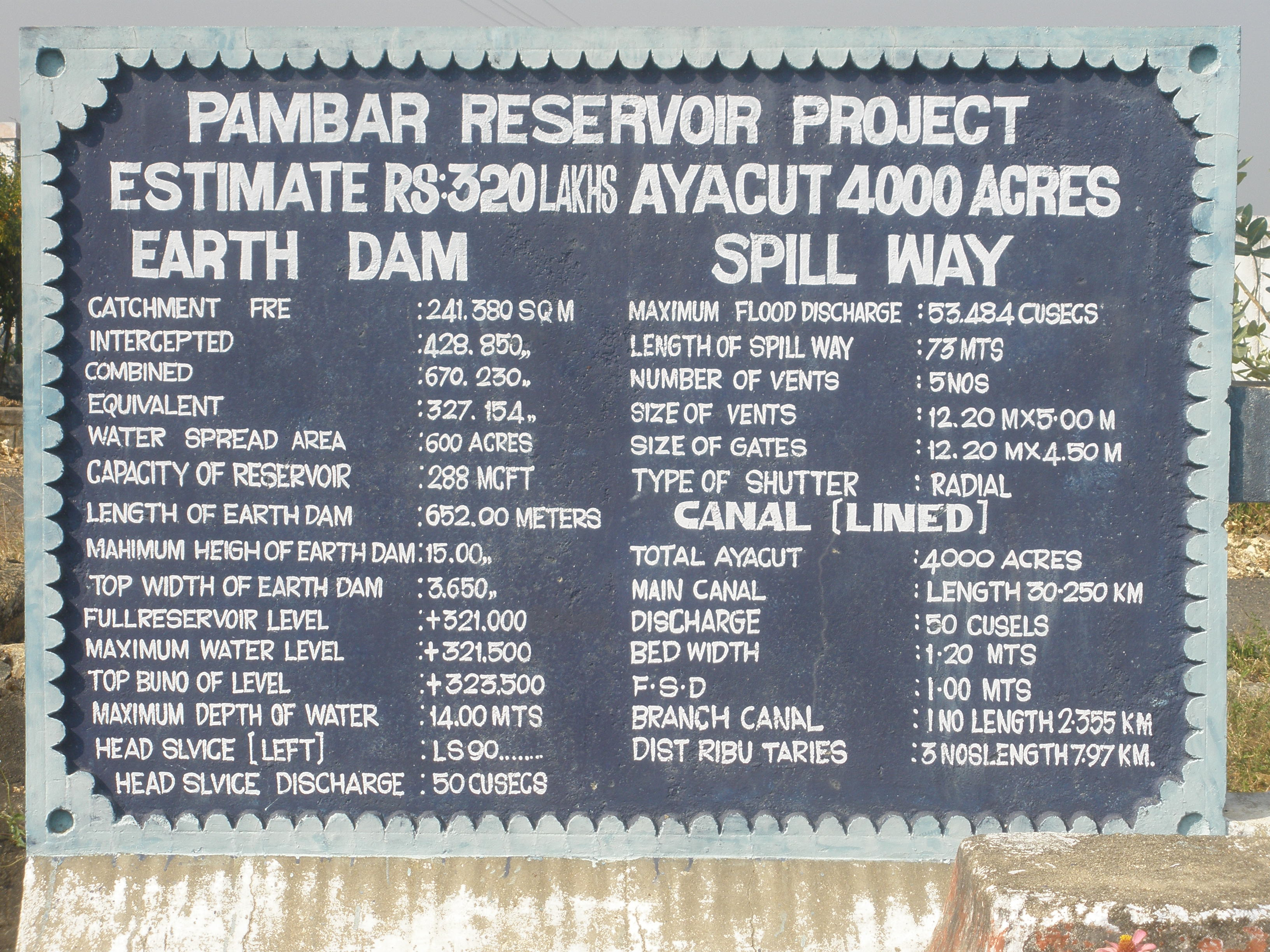

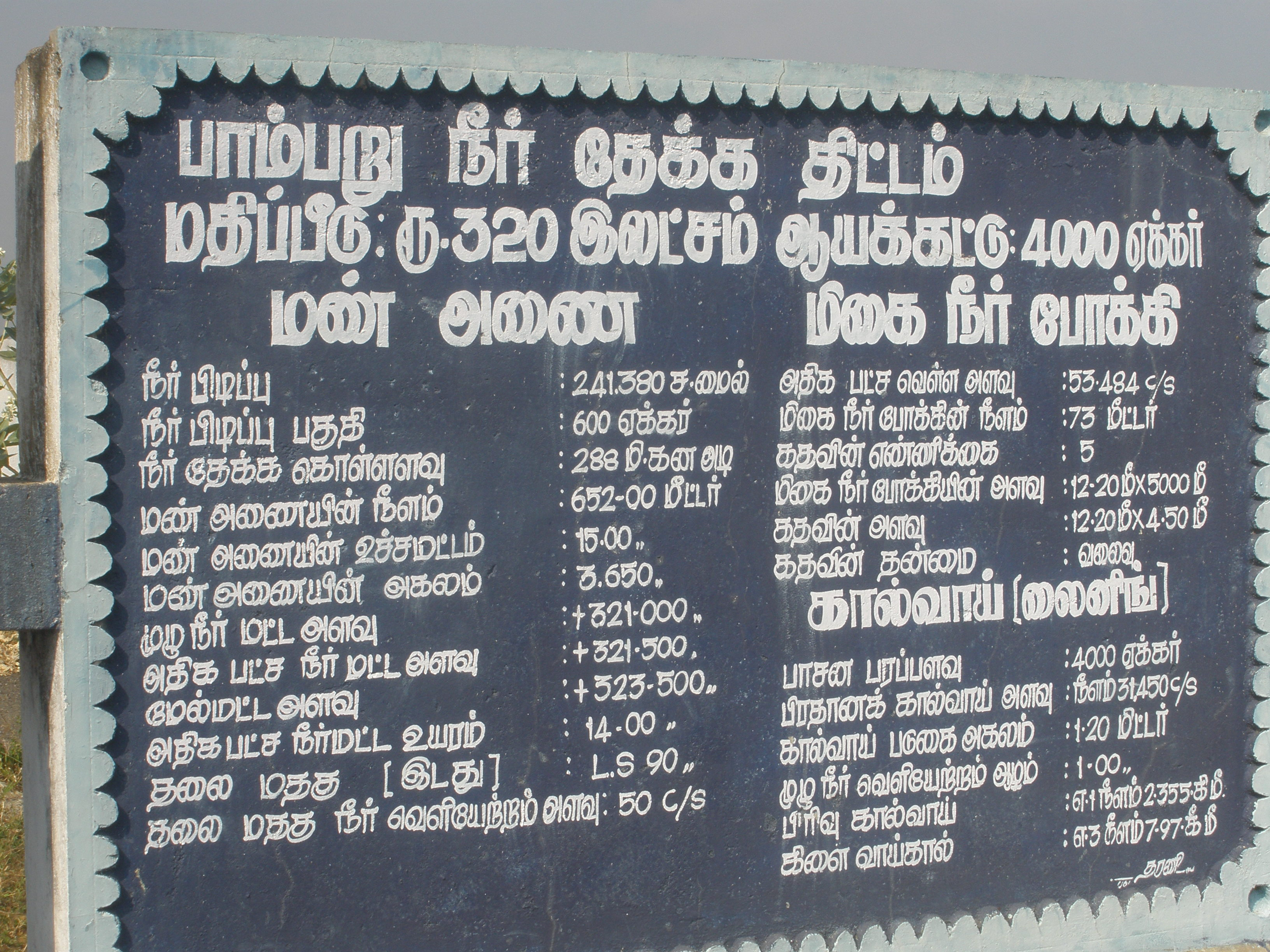

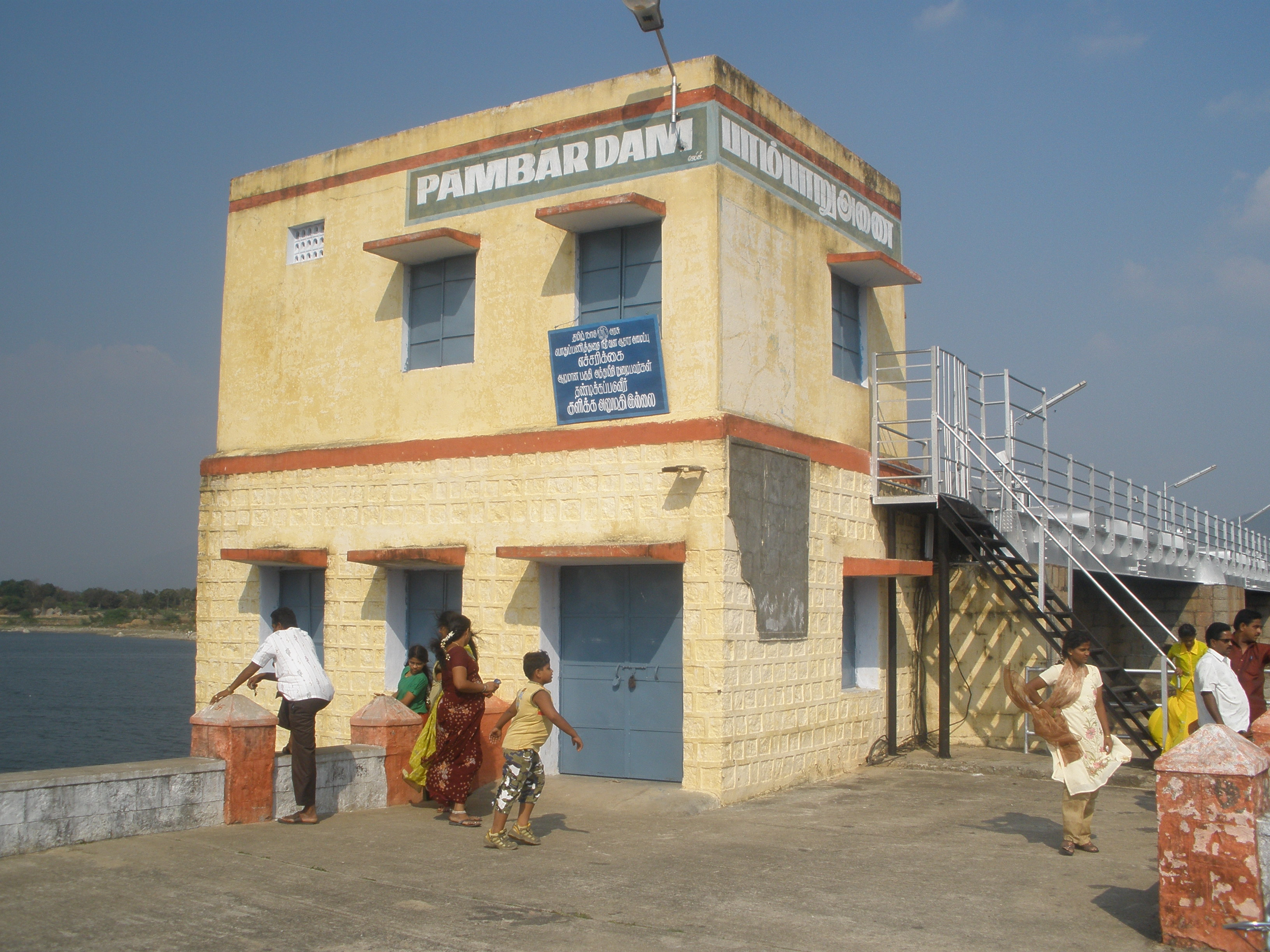

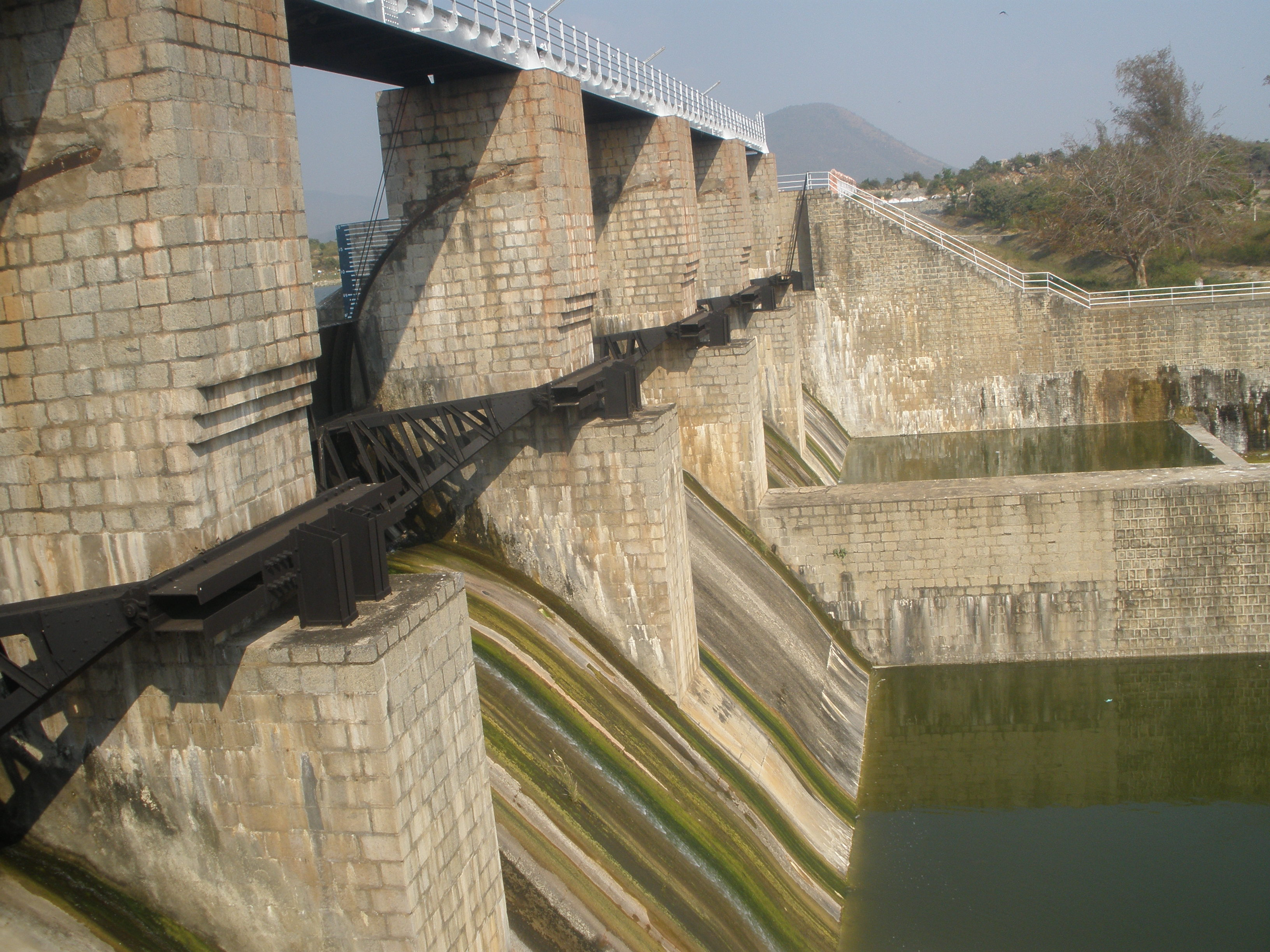

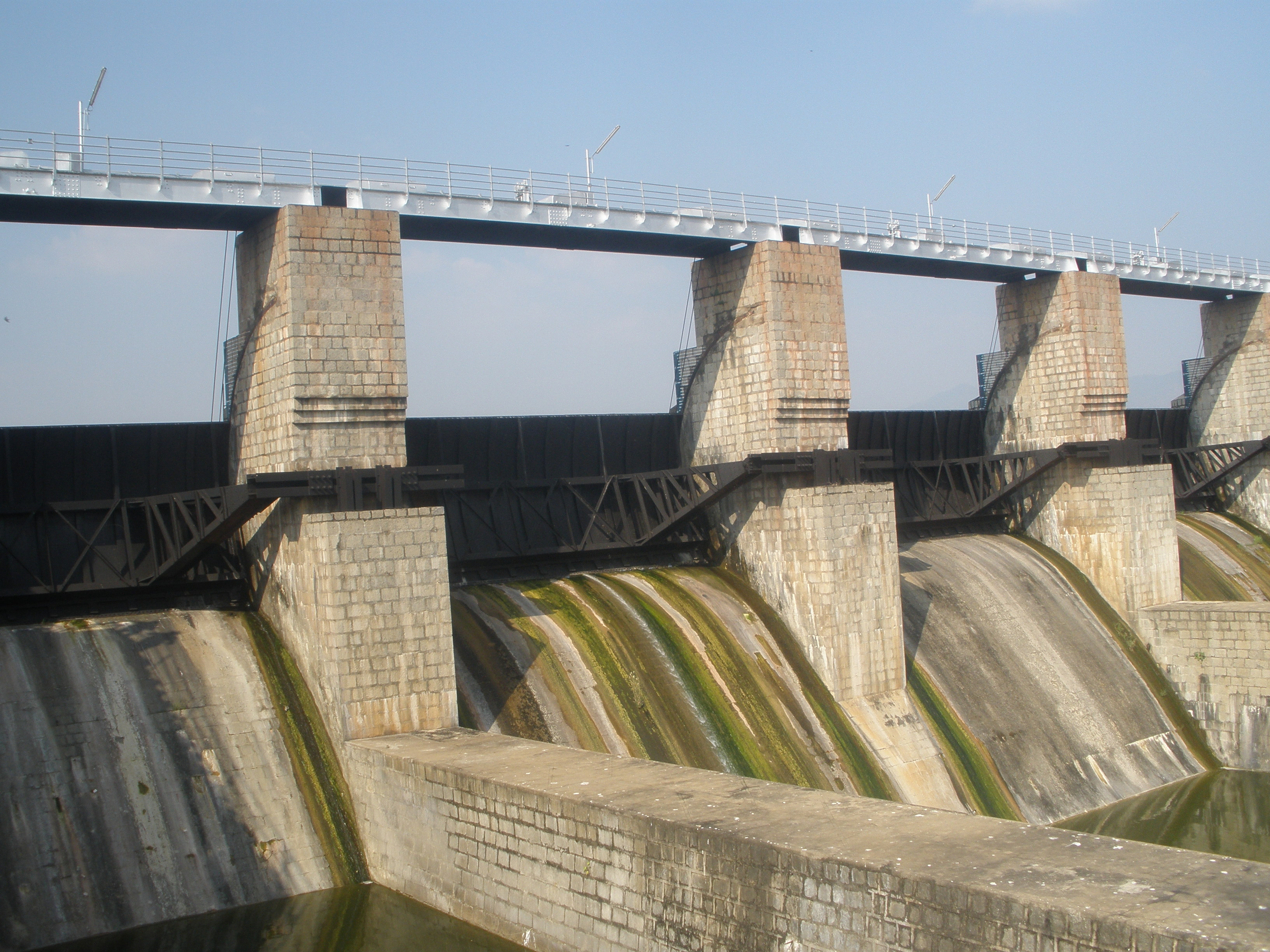

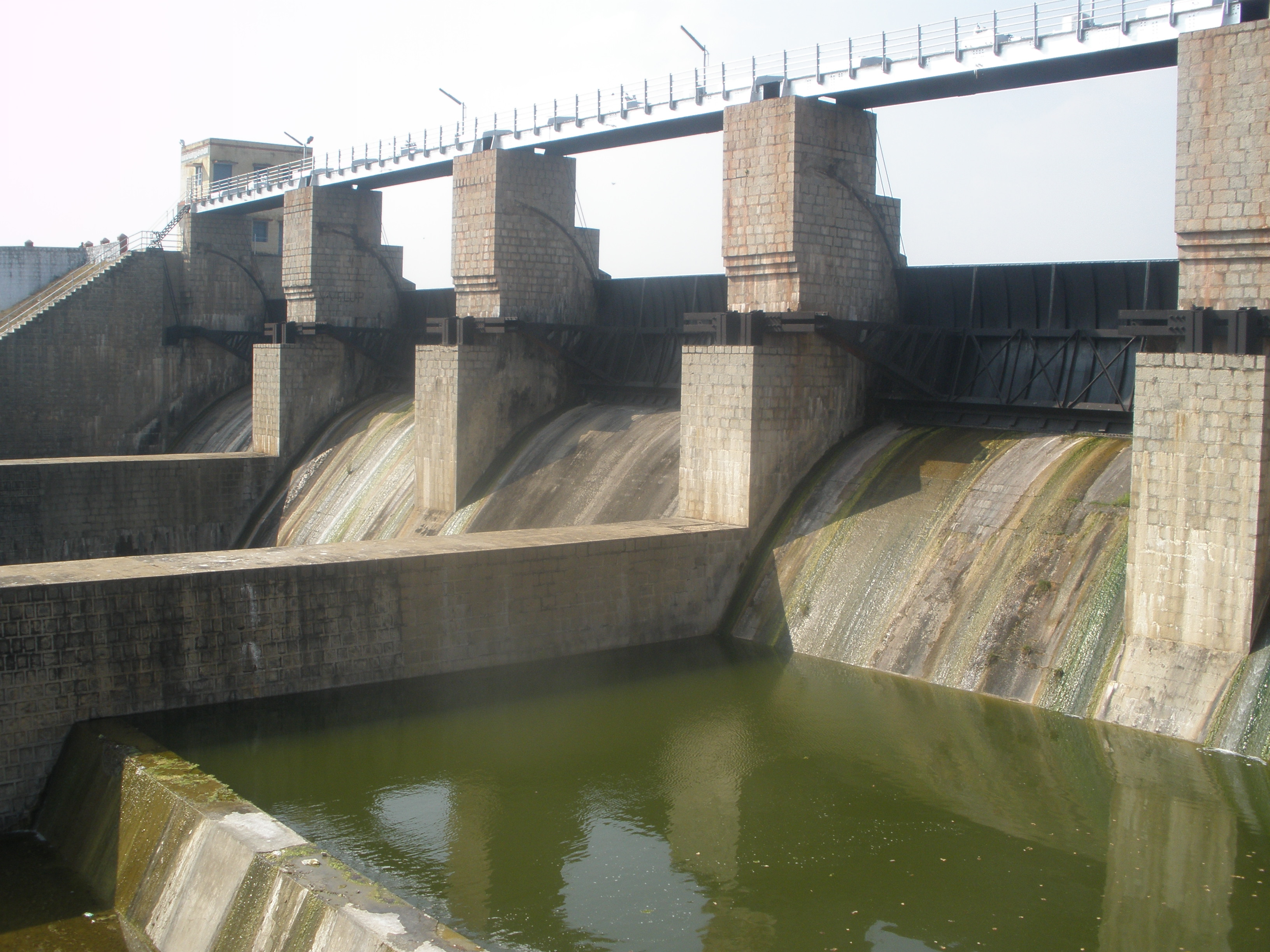

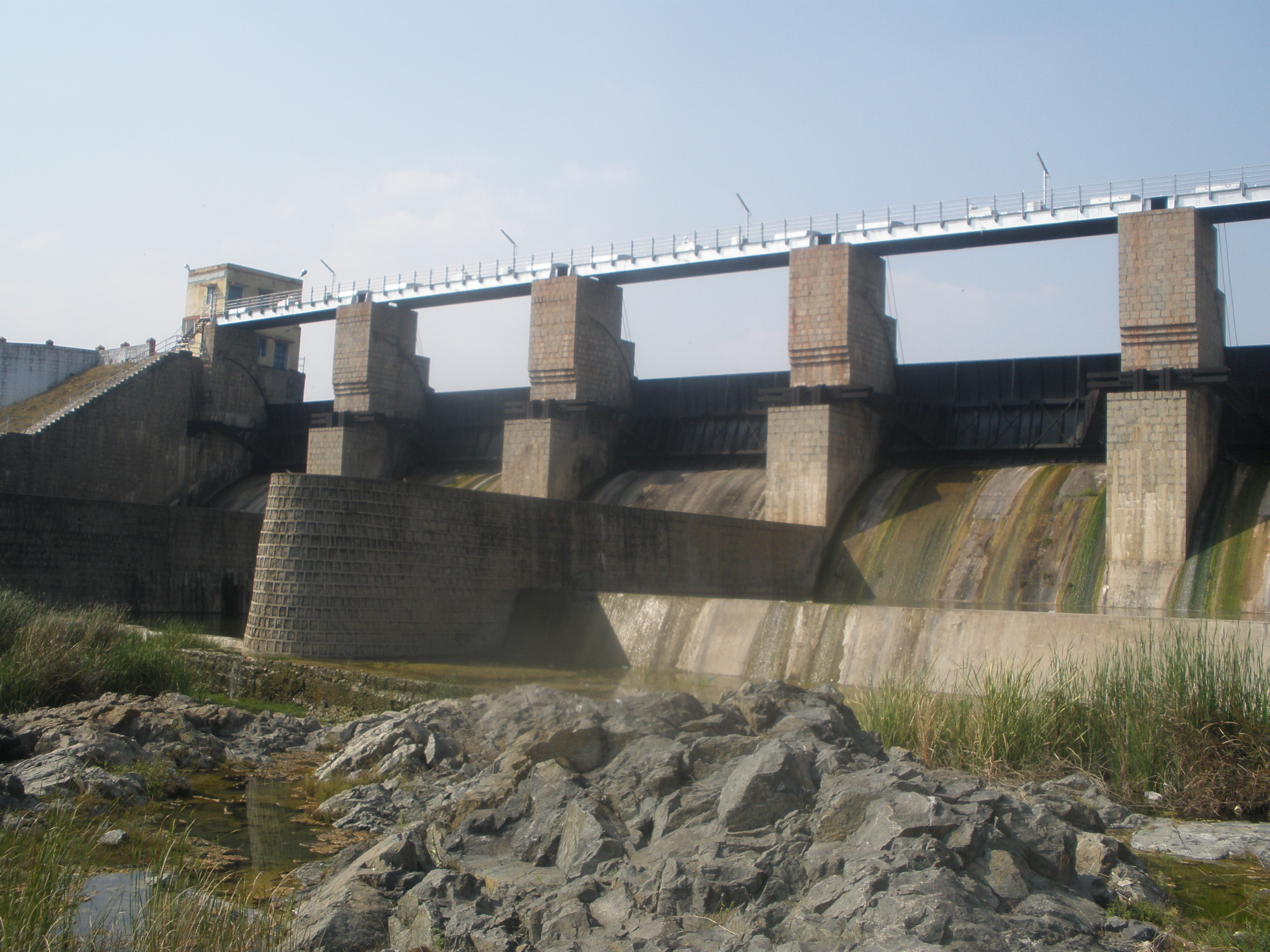

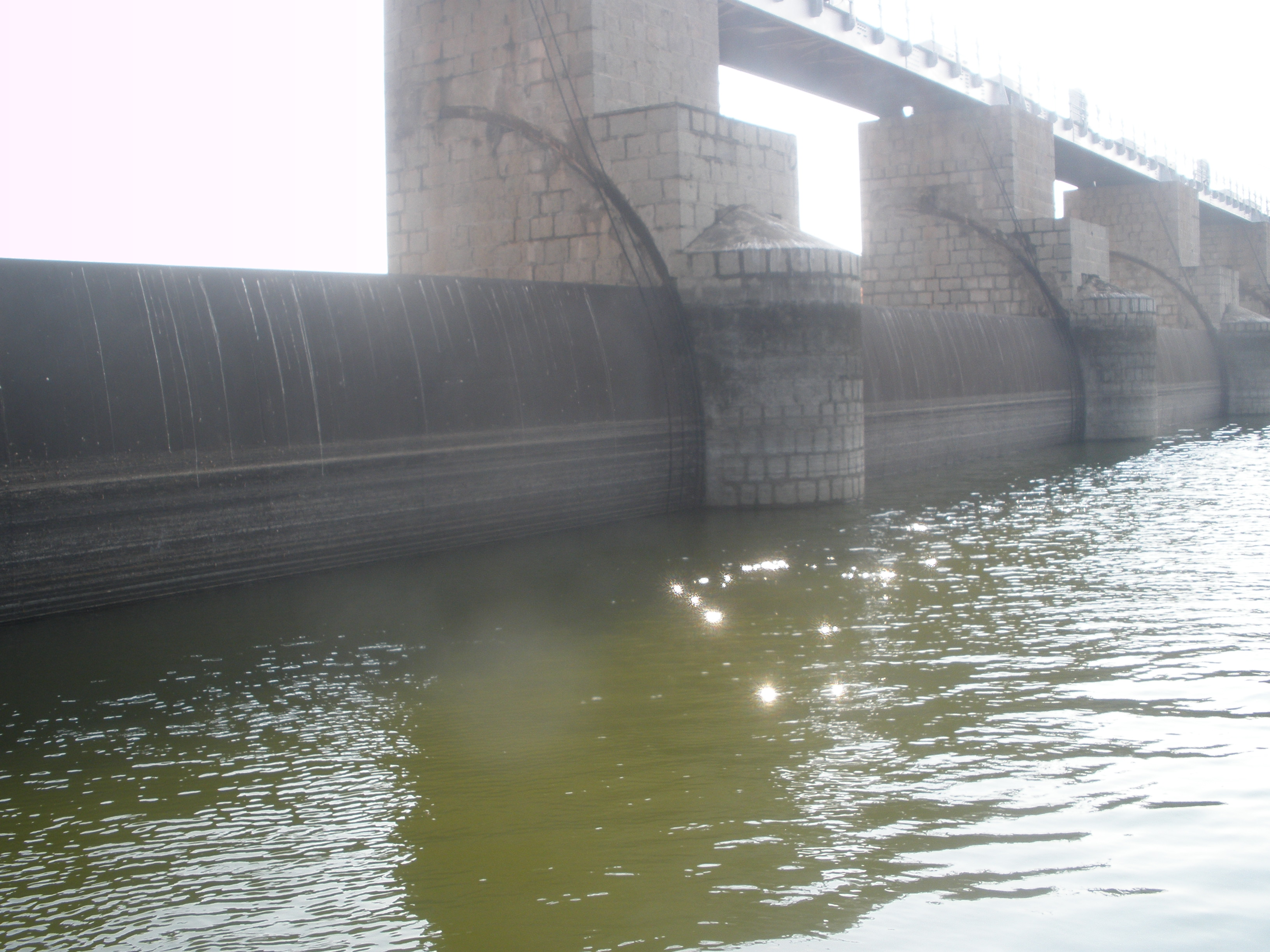
