= Ammankovilpathi =

Village in Tamil Nadu, India

Coordinates: 10.2669988°N 78.3656808°E

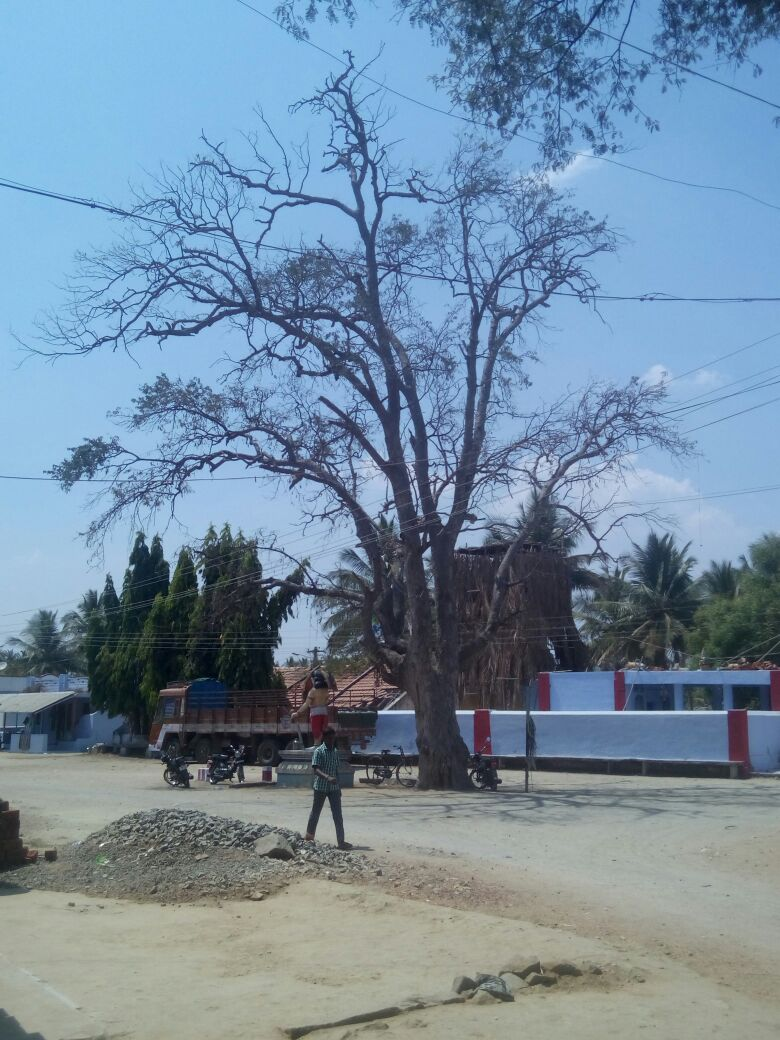

Ammankovilpathi is a village located 15 km from Mecheri in the Indian state of Tamil Nadu. This village has a population of around 2000.
