= Ramanaickenpalayam =

RamanaickenPalayam R.N.Palayam
- Village
- Location in Tamil Nadu, India
- Coordinates: 11°37′44″N 78°33′35″E
- Country: India
- State: Tamil Nadu
- District: Salem
- Taluka: Attur
- Elevation: 230 m (750 ft)

Population (2011)
  - Total: 19,678

Languages
  - Official: Tamil
- Time zone: UTC+5:30 (IST)
- Postal code: 636108

RamanaickenPalayam is a village panchayat in the Salem district in the Indian state of Tamil Nadu.

== Geography ==
Ramanaickenpalayam is surrounded by Pethanaickenpalayam towards west, Gangavalli Taluk towards South, Thalaivasal towards East, Kalrayan Hills towards north. Other nearby cities include Thammampatti, Namagiripettai, Thuraiyur, Rasipuram.

Ramanaickenpalayam is on the border of the Salem district and Viluppuram district. Kalrayan Hills are located north of the village. It is also located 56 kilometres (35 mi) towards east of district headquarters Salem, and 283 kilometres (176 mi) from the state capital Chennai.

The village is on the border of the Salem district and Viluppuram district. Kalrayan Hills are located north of the village.

Vasishta Nadi, one of the longest rivers in Tamil Nadu, flows in this village. The river has created a long delta region which provides drinking water and aides agriculture.

=== Geology ===
The predominant soil in the village is black soil.

== Demographics ==
=== Population ===
The population of the town as per 2011 census by population of the town 19,678.

== Government and politics ==
It is considered as a major village in Attur taluk.

== Economy ==
Agriculture is the main occupation in Ramanaickenpalayam. This village is known for its tapioca crop. Rice, cotton, turmeric and corn are grown as major commercial crops.

There are no banks in the village but the SBI - Zero Account balance opening office is available in this village.

== Education ==
There are three government schools are available in this village.

Tamil Angels Nursery and Primary School is a private school.

== Temples ==
Several temples are found in Ramanaickenpalayam. The Ponniamman Temple is located on the banks of Vasishta Nadi and serves as the major religious centre in the village. A puja is held at the temple on every full moon at midnight.

There are also the Marriamman, Vinayagar, and Iyyapan Temples. In recent years, a new Ponniamman Temple was built.
