= Avadattur =

- Census town
- Location in Tamil Nadu, India
- Coordinates: 11°41′51″N 77°51′48″E
- Country: India
- State: Tamil Nadu
- District: Salem

Population (2001)
  - Total: 8,982

Languages
  - Official: Tamil
- Time zone: UTC+5:30 (IST)

Avadattur is a census town in Salem district in the state of Tamil Nadu, India.

== Demographics ==
As of 2001 India census, Avadattur had a population of 8982. Males constitute 53% of the population and females 47%. Avadattur has an average literacy rate of 53%, lower than the national average of 59.5%; with 63% of the males and 37% of females literate. 12% of the population is under 6 years of age.
