= Vengadathanpatti =

Coordinates: 12°16′09″N 78°30′49″E

Vengadathampatti
- Village
- Vengadathanpatti
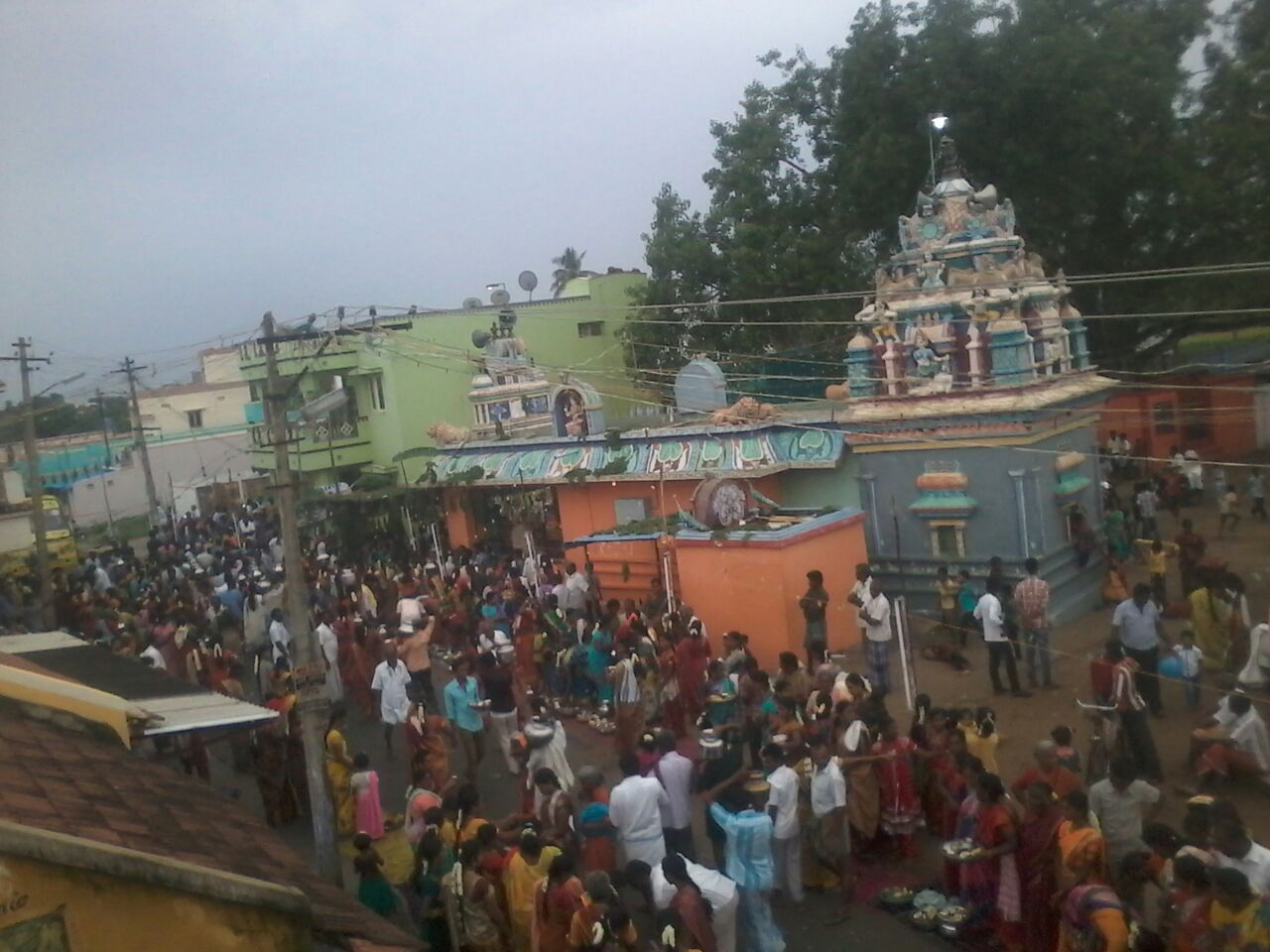
- Anthem: Jana gana mana "Tamil Thai Valthu" (Invocation to Mother Tamil)
- Location in Tamil Nadu
- Country: India
- State: Tamil Nadu
- District: Krishnagiri district
- Block: Uthangarai
- Elevation: 381 m (1,250 ft)

Population (2011)
  - Total: 2,872
- Sex ratio 1499/1373 ♂/♀

Languages
  - Official: Tamil
- Time zone: UTC+5:30 (IST)
- PIN: 635207
- Telephone: 04341
- ISO 3166 code: IN-PB
- Vehicle registration: TN-24
- Post office: Vengadathanpatti

Vengadathampatti is a village located in the Krishnagiri district of Tamil Nadu, India. It is located 2.5 kilometres (1.6 mi) from the head postal office in Uthangarai.

== See also ==
- Category:Villages in Krishnagiri district
- வேங்கடதம்பட்டி ஊராட்சி
