= Alamarathupatty =

Village in Tamil Nadu, India

Alamarathupatty is a village in Tamil Nadu state of India. It is located in the Athoor Taluk of Dindigul district. It is located 7 km (NH - 7) towards south from district headquarters Dindigul.

== Geography ==
Location of this village is 10.311759°N 77.940788°E. This place is at an average altitude of 309 meters above sea level.

== Demographics ==
India's 2011 census, 3,717 (1,861 men, 1,856 women) people living in this village. The average literacy rate is 80.57% of the people in this village. This is 77.41% of literacy than the national average.
