= Dalavaipatti =

- Census town
- Location in Tamil Nadu, India
- Coordinates: 11°40′53″N 78°5′26″E
- Country: India
- State: Tamil Nadu
- District: Salem

Population (2001)
  - Total: 6,256

Languages
  - Official: Tamil
- Time zone: UTC+5:30 (IST)

Dalavaipatti is a census town in Salem district in the state of Tamil Nadu, India.

== Demographics ==
As of 2001 India census, Dalavaipatti had a population of 6256. Males constitute 52% of the population and females 48%. Dalavaipatti has an average literacy rate of 54%, lower than the national average of 59.5%: male literacy is 63% and, female literacy is 45%. In Dalavaipatti, 13% of the population is under 6 years of age.
