= Ammapalayam, Salem =

Village in Tamil Nadu, India

Ammapalayam is a small village in Salem district, Tamil Nadu, India. As of the 2011 Census of India, it had a population of 6,694 across 1,781 households.
