= Kondayampalli =

- Grem panchayat
- Location in Tamil Nadu, India
- Coordinates: 11°27′28″N 78°31′29″E
- Country: India
- State: Tamil Nadu
- District: Salem
- Taluk: Gangavalli

Government
  - Body: Grem panchayat

Population (2011)
  - Total: 3,977

Languages
  - Official: Tamil
- Time zone: UTC+5:30 (IST)
- PIN: 636110

Kondayampalli is a Grem panchayat in Gangavalli taluk, Salem district, Tamil Nadu State, India.

== Festivals ==
In this village people mostly celebrate Diwali and Pongal Festival. As a part of Pongal celebrations usually on Ulavar Thirunal day is celebrated Jallikattu (Tamil: சல்லிகட்டு) or Eruthazhuvuthal (Tamil: ஏறுதழுவல்) And Manju Virattu (Tamil: மஞ்சு விரட்டு) is a bull taming sport played in Tamil Nadu. And on 26 January also celebrated Jallikattu grandly. It has been held for 50+ years.

In January 2016, the villagers were in the news for degying the ban on Jallikattu. In January 2026, three were killed at the village during a Manju Virattu event.

The village has a big lake and the Swaetha River, this is the main water sources for farmer's fields. Madurai Veeran and Vinayagar Festival Atthumedu.

Recently Ther Festival for Sri Mariyamman had been celebrated by the people of kondayampalli on 06.05.2018 to 10.05.2018 in a grand manner. It is one of the main festival of this village.

== Religion ==
- kaaliyamman Temple
- Ganesh (Vinayagar) Temple
- Maarriyamman Temple
- Selliyamman Temple
- Murugan Temple
- Ayyappan Temple
- Perumal Temple
- Pothadiyan Temple
- Mathurakaliyamman Temple
- Periyasamy Temple
- Madurai veern&vinayagar Temple

These are the main temples located in Kondayampalli region. Each and every temple has separate festivals on separate days. The main festival is Maariyamman Ther procession which is celebrated in Tamil months basis in 5 to 7 days. Each day the celebration starts from Marriyanmman Temple with the god carried on a different ther each day and pulled through the streets by people that consider it an honor and end the procession at the same temple. During this time people are performing dances:

Karakattam (Tamil: கரகாட்டம் or karakam (கரகம்) dance) is an ancient folk dance of Tamil Nadu.
Kummi (Tamil: கும்மியாட்டம்) is a folk dance, popular in Tamil Nadu and Kerala in India, danced mostly by Tamil women in circle. Dancing may be different. In some places, it is very simple, with rhythmic clapping. In other places dancers imitate various harvesting activities. Kummi often accompany by songs, called Kummi songs.

Madurai veeran and Vinayagar temple This temple is in the Atthumedu region and at the temple Keda Vettu Pojai is celebrated in Tamil the months basis in 3 days.

first day celebration start a from Madurai Veeran Temple then goes to all temples.
second day is Keda Vettu Poojai.
third day there is Manjal Neeratu Vizha and several type of children's games are played.

There is a mosque located near Maarriyamman Kovil.

A minority Christian church located near Bismilla Rice Mill at Gangavalli main road. It is one of the most visited pilgrimage place for the peoples residing in Salem. Events like Marriage, prayers are conducted on a regular basis.

== Education ==
- Government Higher Secondary School, Kondayampalli (6–12)
- Sri Vinayaga Nursery and Primary School, Kondayampalli (PreKG-6th)
- Saraswathy Nursery & Primary School, Kondayampalli (PreKG-4th)
- Panchayat Union Elementary School, Kondayampalli(1–5)
