= Adaiyur, Salem =

Adaiyur
- village
- Location in Tamil Nadu, India Adaiyur (India)
- Coordinates: 11°41′17″N 77°50′28″E
- Country: India
- State: Tamil Nadu
- District: Salem

Population (2011)
  - Total: 3,567

Languages
  - Official: Tamil
- Time zone: UTC+5:30 (IST)

Adaiyur is a panchayat village in the Indian state of Tamil Nadu. Administratively, Adaiyur is under Idappadi taluk of Salem district in Tamil Nadu. It is 45 km by road west of Salem.

There is one village in the Adaiyur gram panchayat: Adaiyur. As of 2011 it had a population of 3,567.
