= Kurumbapatti =

- Village
- Location in Tamil Nadu, India Kurumbapatti (India)
- Coordinates: 10°39′38.60″N 77°52′10.55″E
- Country: India
- State: Tamil Nadu
- District: Karur

Languages
  - Official: Tamil
- Time zone: UTC+5:30 (IST)

Kurumbapatti is a village in Karur district in the Indian state of Tamil Nadu.

== Demographics ==
A village with around 350 homes and 1000 people. mostly depending on agriculture. Sri Bagavathi amman and Sri Muthaalamman temple are best known. It has one high school, and a primary school.
