= Chokkanathapuram (Sivaganga) =

- Village
- Location in Tamil Nadu, India Chokkanathapuram (India)
- Coordinates: 10°7′0″N 78°30′0″E
- Country: India
- State: Tamil Nadu
- District: Sivaganga

Languages
  - Official: Tamil
- Time zone: IST
- Postal Code: 630313
- STD code: 04575
- Vehicle registration: TN-

Chokkanathapuram is a village in Sivaganga district of Tamil Nadu state in India. Manimutharu river flows through the village and there are many water bodies including Yeriyur Kalungupatti which overflows occasionally flooding the areas nearby.

In September 2023, after M Kannan was elected as the panchayat president he planted hundreds of fruit saplings to make the drought-prone area into a green space.
