= Naduvalur =

- Village
- Location in Tamil Nadu, India Naduvalur (India)
- Coordinates: 11.48°N 78.65°E
- Country: India
- State: Tamil Nadu
- District: Salem
- Established: 1962
- Elevation: 292 m (958 ft)

Population (2010)
  - Total: 6,000

Languages
  - Official: Tamil
- Time zone: UTC+5:30 (IST)
- PIN: 636105
- Telephone code: 04282
- Vehicle registration: TN-27, TN-30, TN-54 and TN-77
- Coastline: 0 kilometres (0 mi)
- Nearest city: Salem
- Lok Sabha constituency: Kallakurichi
- Climate: Moderate (Köppen)

Naduvalur is a village in the tehsil (taluk) of Gangavalli, which is located in the Salem district of the state of Tamil Nadu. The village is located in the central part of the southernmost state of India. Naduvalur is the largest village in the tehsil, and has the largest delegation to the Gangavalli Tehsil Council.

== Location ==
Naduvalur is located 60 km from Salem, 12 km from Attur, 43 km from Perambalur and 3 km from Gangavalli. It is located on the State Highway 157 connecting Attur and Trichirapalli. Tamil is the primary language used here. This is a fast developing village in Gangavalli taluk.

== Politics ==
Naduvalur is part of Kallakurichi in terms of Lok Shaba constituency and part of Gangavalli in terms of state assembly constituency.
