= Kongupatty =

Coordinates: 11.8610°N 78.0178°E

Kongupatti (Village ID 636305) is a semi-developed village in Omalur taluk, Salem district, Tamil Nadu, India. It is 26 kilometres (16 mi) northwest from Salem city. According to the 2011 census it has a population of 10400 living in 2657 households.
