= Mecheri =

- Panchayat town
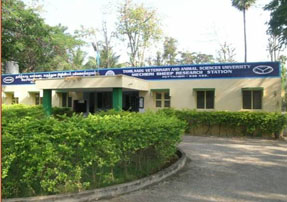
- Mecheri Sheep Research Station

- Location in Tamil Nadu, India
- Coordinates: 11°51′03″N 77°57′23″E
- Country: India
- State: Tamil Nadu
- District: Salem

Area
  - Total: 12.5 km^{2} (4.8 sq mi)

Population (2011)
  - Total: 25,674
  - Density: 2,050/km^{2} (5,320/sq mi)

Languages
  - Official: Tamil
- Time zone: UTC+5:30 (IST)

Mecheri is a panchayat town in Mettur taluk of Salem district in the Indian state of Tamil Nadu. It is one of the 31 panchayat towns in the district. Spread across an area of 12.5 km^{2} (4.8 sq mi), it had a population of 25,674 individuals as per the 2011 census.

== Geography and administration ==
Mecheri is located in Mettur taluk of Salem district in the Indian state of Tamil Nadu. Spread across an area of 12.5 km^{2} (4.8 sq mi), it is one of the 31 panchayat towns in the district. The town panchayat is divided into 18 wards. It is headed by a chairperson, who is elected by the members, who are chosen through direct elections. The town forms part of the Mettur Assembly constituency that elects its member to the Tamil Nadu legislative assembly and the Dharmapuri Lok Sabha constituency that elects its member to the Parliament of India.

== Demographics ==
As per the 2011 census, Mecheri had a population of 25,674 individuals across 6,330 households. The population saw a marginal increase compared to the previous census in 2001 when 20,455 inhabitants were registered. The population consisted of 13,495 males and 12,181 females. About 2,716 individuals were below the age of six years. About 4.6% of the population belonged to scheduled castes. The entire population is classified as urban. The town has an average literacy rate of 72.7%. Hinduism was the majority religion which was followed by 99.3% of the population, with Christianity (0.2%) and Islam (0.3%) being minor religions.

About 41.2% of the eligible population were employed, of which majority were involved in agriculture and allied activities. Mecheri is known for its sheep farming. The Mecheri Sheep Research Station was established in 1978.
