= Jalakandapuram =

Jalakandapuram Jalam-kanda-puram
- Panchayat town
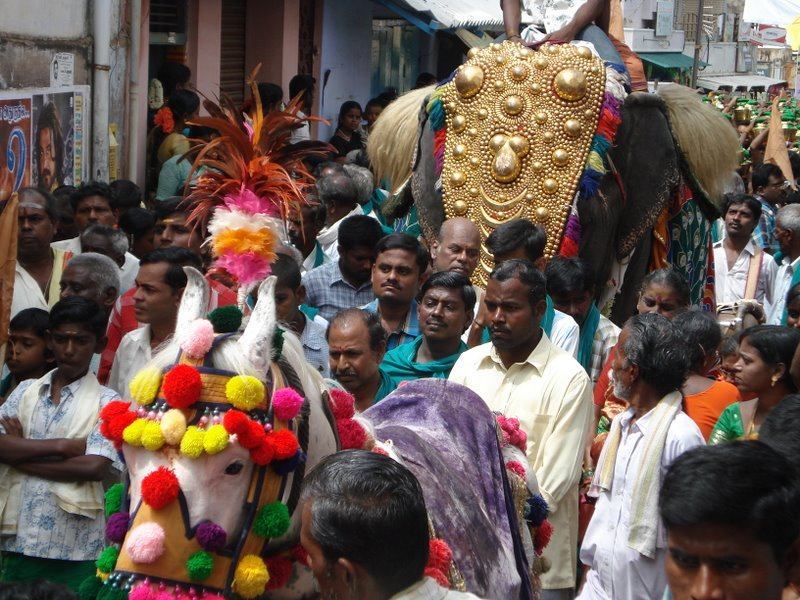
- A traditional festival celebrated in Jalakandapuram

- Location in Tamil Nadu, India
- Coordinates: 11.7°N 77.88°E
- Country: India
- State: Tamil Nadu
- District: Salem

Area
  - Total: 4.66 km^{2} (1.80 sq mi)

Population (2024)
  - Total: 22,800 approximately
  - Density: 4,890/km^{2} (12,700/sq mi)

Languages
  - Official: Tamil
- Time zone: UTC+5:30 (IST)

Jalakandapuram is a panchayat town in Mettur taluk of Salem district in the Indian state of Tamil Nadu. It is one of the 31 panchayat towns in the district. Spread across an area of 4.66 km^{2} (1.80 sq mi), it has a population of approximately 22,800 people as of 2024.

== Geography and administration ==
Jalakandapuram is located in Mettur taluk of Salem district in the Indian state of Tamil Nadu. Spread across an area of 4.66 km^{2} (1.80 sq mi), it is located about 35 km (22 mi) from the district headquarters Salem. It is one of the 31 panchayat towns in the district. The town panchayat is headed by a chairperson, who is elected by the members, who are chosen through direct elections. The town forms part of the Edappadi Assembly constituency that elects its member to the Tamil Nadu legislative assembly and the Salem Lok Sabha constituency that elects its member to the Parliament of India.

=== Climate ===
The region has a tropical climate with hot summers and mild winters. The highest temperatures are recorded in April and May, with lowest recordings in December-January.

Climate data for Jalakandapuram
Month	Jan	Feb	Mar	Apr	May	Jun	Jul	Aug	Sep	Oct	Nov	Dec	Year
Mean daily maximum °C (°F)	30.9 (87.6)	33.6 (92.5)	36.1 (97.0)	36.8 (98.2)	36.4 (97.5)	34.2 (93.6)	32.6 (90.7)	32.2 (90.0)	32.7 (90.9)	31.1 (88.0)	30.3 (86.5)	29.9 (85.8)	33.1 (91.5)
Mean daily minimum °C (°F)	19.1 (66.4)	20.2 (68.4)	22.2 (72.0)	24.8 (76.6)	25.1 (77.2)	24.1 (75.4)	23 (73)	23.1 (73.6)	22.7 (72.9)	22.7 (72.9)	21.1 (70.0)	19.5 (67.1)	22.3 (72.1)
Average precipitation mm (inches)	8 (0.3)	11 (0.4)	17 (0.7)	50 (2.0)	101 (4.0)	49 (1.9)	78 (3.1)	106 (4.2)	113 (4.4)	182 (7.2)	88 (3.5)	36 (1.4)	839 (33.1)
Source: Climate-data.org

== Demographics ==
As per 2024, Jalakandapuram has a population of approximately 22,800 individuals across approximately 4800 households. The population saw a marginal increase compared to the previous census in 2001 when 14,077 inhabitants were registered. The population consisted of 8,138 males and 8,046 females. About 1,523 individuals were below the age of six years. About 2.2% of the population belonged to scheduled castes. The entire population is classified as urban. The town has an average literacy rate of 81.5%.

About 43.8% of the eligible population were employed, of which majority were involved in agriculture and allied activities. Hinduism was the majority religion which was followed by 96.0% of the population, with Islam (3.4%) and Christianity (0.6%) being minor religions.
