= Govindhampalayam =

- village
- Location in Tamil Nadu, India Govindhampalayam (India)
- Coordinates: 10.9500°N 78.0833°E
- Country: India
- State: Tamil Nadu
- District: Karur

Languages
  - Official: Tamil
- Time zone: UTC+5:30 (IST)
- PIN: 639 113
- Telephone code: 04324
- Vehicle registration: TN-47

Govindhampalayam is a village in Karur district in the Indian state of Tamil Nadu situated on the banks of Cauvery.
