= Kolathur, Salem =

Kulathur
- Panchayat town
- Location in Tamil Nadu, India
- Coordinates: 11.51°N 77.45°E
- Country: India
- State: Tamil Nadu
- District: Salem

Area
  - Total: 9.45 km^{2} (3.65 sq mi)

Population (2011)
  - Total: 12,745
  - Density: 1,350/km^{2} (3,490/sq mi)

Languages
  - Official: Tamil
- Time zone: UTC+5:30 (IST)

Kulathur is a panchayat town in Mettur taluk of Salem district in the Indian state of Tamil Nadu. It is one of the 31 panchayat towns in the district. Spread across an area of 9.45 km^{2} (3.65 sq mi), it had a population of 12,745 individuals as per the 2011 census.

== Geography and administration ==
Kulathur is located in Mettur taluk of Salem district in the Indian state of Tamil Nadu. Spread across an area of 9.45 km^{2} (3.65 sq mi), it is located about 62 km (39 mi) from the district headquarters Salem, and 10 km (6.2 mi) from Mettur. It is one of the 31 panchayat towns in the district.

The town panchayat is divided into 15 wards. It is headed by a chairperson, who is elected by the members, who are chosen through direct elections. The town forms part of the Mettur Assembly constituency that elects its member to the Tamil Nadu legislative assembly and the Dharmapuri Lok Sabha constituency that elects its member to the Parliament of India.

== Demographics ==
As per the 2011 census, Kolathur had a population of 12,745 individuals across 3,413 households. The population saw a marginal increase compared to the previous census in 2001 when 10,254 inhabitants were registered. The population consisted of 6,513 males and 6,235 females. About 1,128 individuals were below the age of six years. About 22.7% of the population belonged to scheduled castes and 9% belonged to scheduled tribes. The entire population is classified as urban. The town has an average literacy rate of 72.8%.

About 46.3% of the eligible population were employed, of which majority were involved in agriculture and allied activities. Hinduism was the majority religion which was followed by 96.5% of the population, with Christianity (1.4%) and Islam (2%) being minor religions.
