= Nangavalli =

- Panchayat town
- Location in Tamil Nadu, India
- Coordinates: 11°28′25″N 77°23′19″E
- Country: India
- State: Tamil Nadu
- District: Salem

Area
  - Total: 8.13 km^{2} (3.14 sq mi)

Population (2011)
  - Total: 10,809
  - Density: 1,330/km^{2} (3,440/sq mi)

Languages
  - Official: Tamil
- Time zone: UTC+5:30 (IST)

Nangavalli is a panchayat town in Mettur taluk of Salem district in the Indian state of Tamil Nadu. It is one of the 31 panchayat towns in the district. Spread across an area of 8.13 km^{2} (3.14 sq mi), it had a population of 10,809 individuals as per the 2011 census.

== Geography and administration ==
Nangavalli is located in Mettur taluk of Salem district in the Indian state of Tamil Nadu. Spread across an area of 8.13 km^{2} (3.14 sq mi), it is located on the road connecting Mettur and Tharamangalam. It is one of the 31 panchayat towns in the district. The region has a tropical climate with hot summers and mild winters. The highest temperatures are recorded in April and May, with lowest recordings in December-January.

The town panchayat is sub-divided into 15 wards. It is headed by a chairperson, who is elected by the members, who are chosen through direct elections. The town forms part of the Edappadi Assembly constituency that elects its member to the Tamil Nadu legislative assembly and the Salem Lok Sabha constituency that elects its member to the Parliament of India.

== Demographics ==
As per the 2011 census, Nangavalli had a population of 10,809 individuals across 2,706 households. The population saw a marginal increase compared to the previous census in 2001 when 9,676 inhabitants were registered. The population consisted of 5,505 males and 5,304 females. About 1,041 individuals were below the age of six years. About 15% of the population belonged to scheduled castes. The entire population is classified as urban. The town has an average literacy rate of 74.5%.

About 43.5% of the eligible population were employed, of which majority were involved in agriculture and handloom activities. Hinduism was the majority religion which was followed by 98.3% of the population, with Christianity (0.4%) and Islam (1.2%) being minor religions.
