= Chokkanathapuram, Kerala =

Chokkanathapuram
- village
- Location in Kerala, India Chokkanathapuram (India)
- Coordinates: 10°47′0″N 76°39′0″E
- Country: India
- State: Kerala
- District: Palakkad

Languages
  - Official: Malayalam, English
- Time zone: UTC+5:30 (IST)
- Postal code: 678005
- Vehicle registration: KL-

Chokkanathapuram is a village in Palakkad district in the state of Kerala in India. They operate in IST (UTC+5:30) time. The elevation is 95 m above sea level.
