= Tirumala Shanivaralu =

Hindu festival in India

- Observed by: Hindus mainly in Andhra Pradesh, Tamil Nadu, Karnata, Kerala
- Type: Hindu
- Begins: 1st of Tamil Month Purattasi
- Ends: 31st of Tamil Month Purattasi
- Date: September–October

Tirumala Shanivara or Purattasi Sani (Telugu: తిరుమల శనివారాలు, Tamil: புரட்டாசி சனி) is a Hindu festival celebrated in and around Tirupati region, Southern Andhra Pradesh, Northern Tamil Nadu and South eastern Karnataka. The Hindu deity, Venkateswara, is worshiped during this festival every year.
