= Ulipuram =

Coordinates: 11°28′N 78°28′E

Ulipuram ulipuram
- village
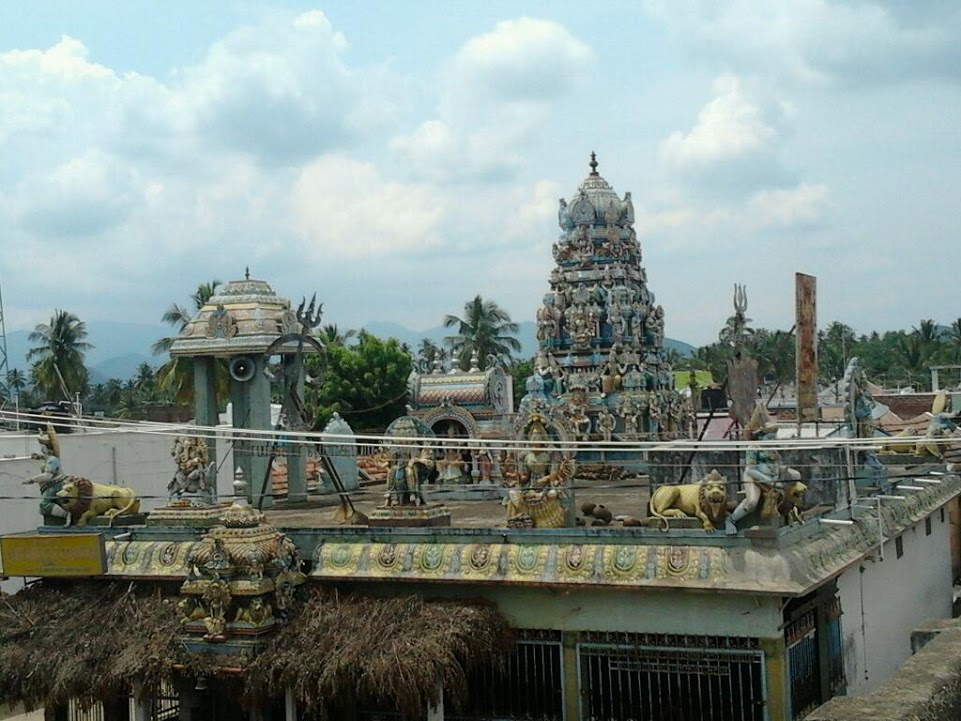
- Interactive map of Ulipuram
- Country: India
- State: Tamil Nadu
- District: Salem

Government
  - Type: State governments

Population (2002)
  - Total: 10,000

Languages
  - Official: Tamil
- Time zone: UTC+5:30 (IST)
- PIN: 636118
- Telephone code: 04282
- Vehicle registration: TN-77
- Nearest city: Thamampatti
- Literacy: 90%
- Lok Sabha constituency: Kallakurici
- Climate: Coolest & hottest (Köppen)

Ulipuram is a village in Gangavalli taluk, Salem district, Tamil Nadu state in India.

Geological research and evidence confirms the history and existence of this habitat since the 16th century and it was known as Puliyarampur. The place was named during the time of "Nayakkar". Two 16th Century hero stones and two slabs containing Tamil inscriptions with details of donations to a nearby temple to run a religious retreat by using the revenue from paddy fields have been discovered in Ulipuram.

Now, the village is more secular, consisting of various castes mainly Nayakkar, Vanniyar, Kurumbar, Kavundar and Reddiyar. The village is historically known for agriculture, sheep, goat and cow breeding. Ulipuram is a predominantly agricultural community with major crops including rice, nuts, sugarcane, and corn.

Residences are centralized around the surrounding farms of the area, sub-dividing Ulipuram into groups and localities including:

- Eecha Oodai
- Kulimeduthottam
- Annaikattu
- Vembarasu
- Ulipuram Pudur
- Mettutheru
- KalanKaradu
- Thonthi Pillayar Kovil,
- Andi Kuttai
- NariKaradu
- Nallathangal Kuttai
- Nandukitan Pudur
- Mankaradu
- VisamoongilKuttai
- KuttiKaradu
- Bonthupuli Kadu.

Historically, Ulipuram receives ample rainfall which helps its agricultural activity. However, since 1996 there's been a reduced rainfall and farming has been severely affected. Hence, some farmers began seeking livelihood in other sectors of the economy.

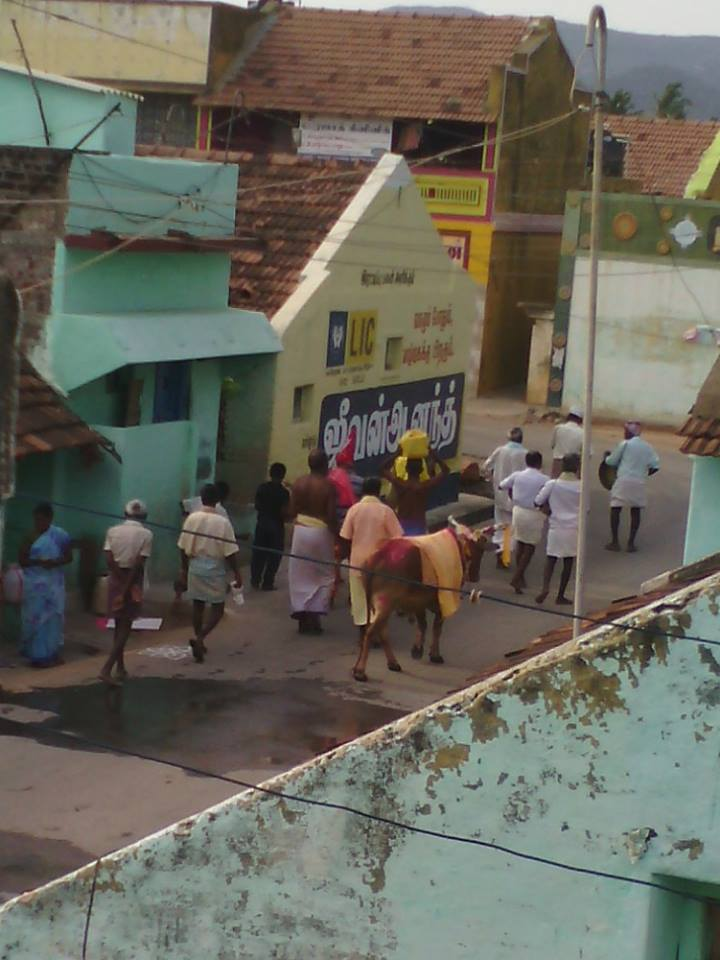
Proceedings of Respect to Cow

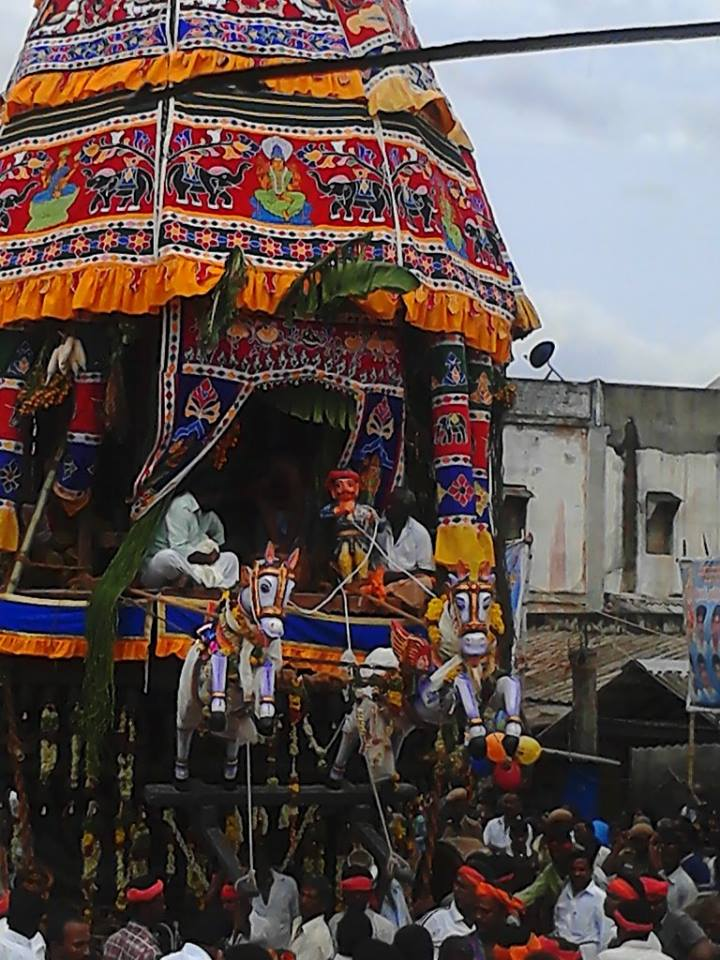
Close up shot of Theru

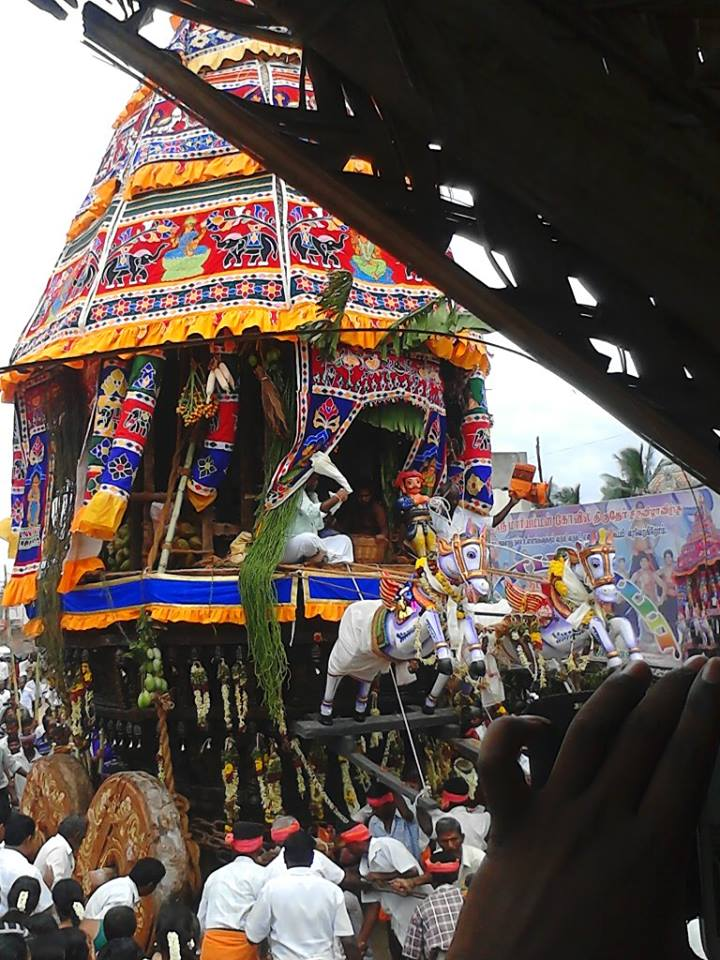
Theru

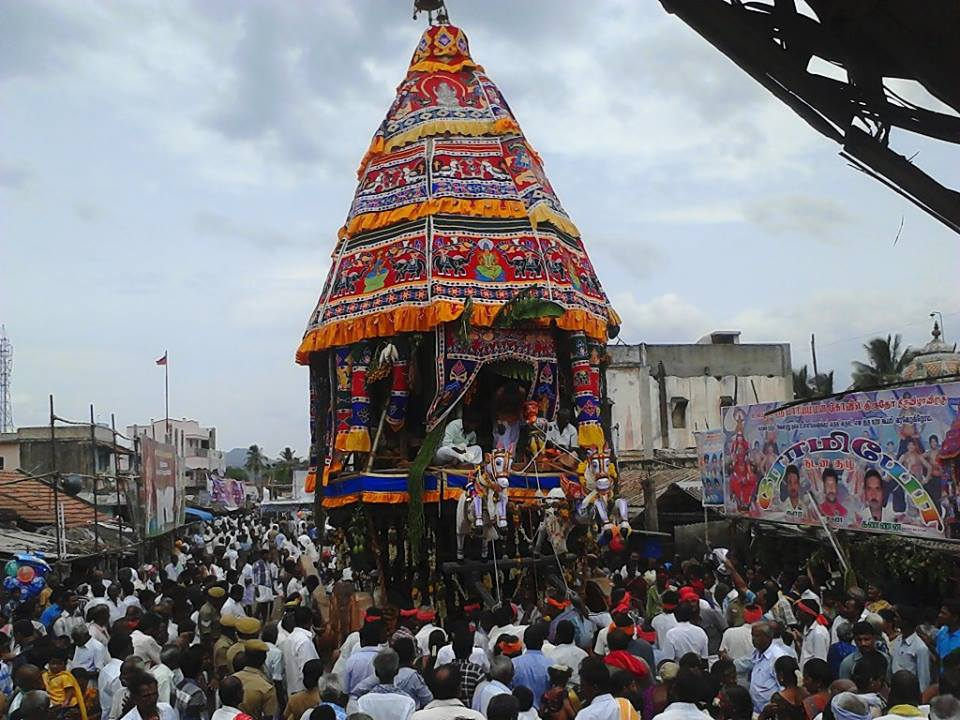
Alternate shot of Theru

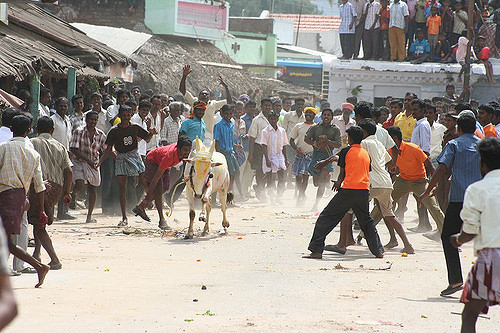
Eruthu attam - Jallikattu

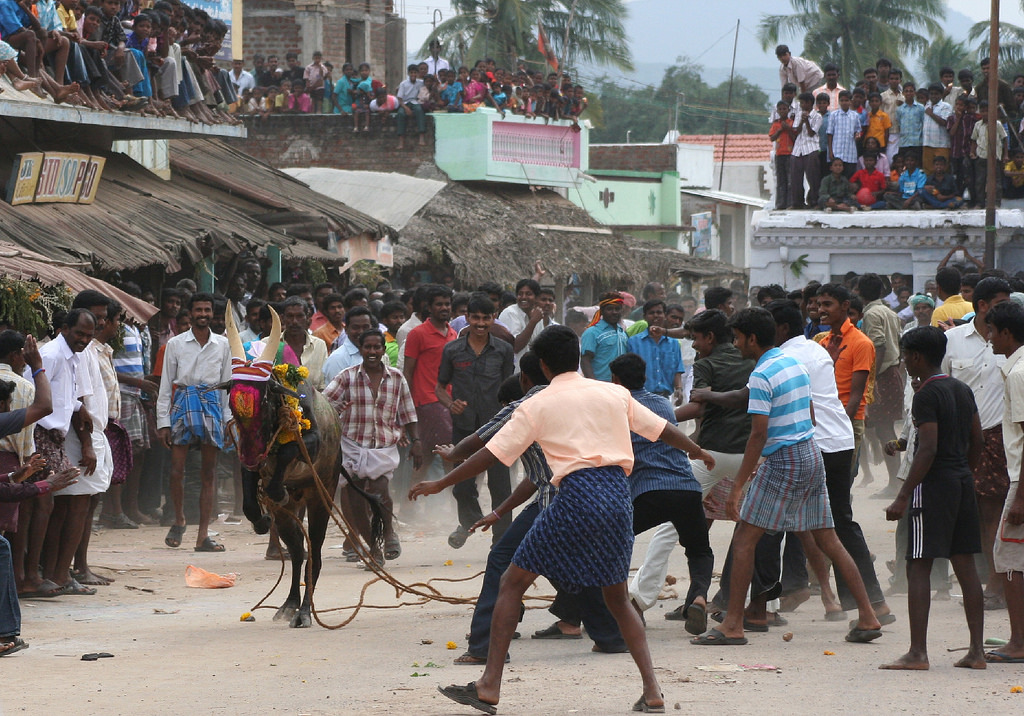
Eru thaluvuthal -Jallikattu

After 24 years, Maha Kumbhabhishekam has been held at Arulmighu Maariamman Temple (HRNC Temple ID TM005146) on 17 September 2023.

Kumbhabhishekam, also known as Samprokshanam which is a Hindu temple ritual that is believed to homogenize, synergize and unite the mystic powers of the deity.

This grand event has been celebrated as a festival along with lot of traditional customs viz.,

- Mulaipari with gummipattu
- Karakumbam with ethnic dance
- Utchavar veethi ula with mela thalam

On the said day and at an auspicious time, the Kumbha is bathed with the charged and sanctified holy waters, that confers divine blessings on all devotees.

== Temples ==
Arulmighu Marriamman Kovil temple is at the center of the village, dedicated to goddess Marriamman, now listed under HRNC.

Nearby temples include:

- Marriamman Kovil (Ulipuram)
- Vinayagar Kovil
- Piddariammam kovil
- Murugan kovil
- Thonthipillayar kovil
- Pambalaamman Kovil
- Perumal kovil
- varunabaghavaan kovil
- sivan kovil ulipuram
- Pallathu Karupanar kovil Ulipuram
- Nallathangal Kovil ulipuram

== Main crops ==
- Paddy
- Turmeric
- Tapioca
- Corn
- Sugarcane
- Ground nut
- Banana
- Coconut
- Vegetables

== Work ==
- Agriculture
- Sago factories
- Cattle breeding
- Heavy motor vehicle drivers
- Bore well operators

== List of Areas in Ulipuram ==
- kulimeduthottam
- Anaikattu
- Ulipuram Pudur
- Vembarasu
- Mettutheru
- KalanKaradu
- Thonthi Pillayar Kovil
- Andi Kuttai
- NariKaradu
- Nallathangal Kuttai
- Nandukitan Pudur
- Mankaradu
- VisamoongilKuttai
- KuttiKaradu
- Bonthupuli Kadu
- EEchaodai

== Factory ==
- Sri ganabathi gloves knitting

== Government Schools ==
- Panchayath Union primary school (Ulipuram)
- Panchayath Union higher secondary school (Ulipuram)
- Panchayath Union primary school (Kalankaradu)
- Panchayath Union primary school (Echaoodai)
- Panchayath Union primary school (Pudhur)
- Few preschools (Sathunavu Pallikodam)

== Private Schools ==
- Saraswathi Matriculation School

== Banks ==
- DBS Bank
- Primary Agricultural Cooperative Society

== ATM ==
- India 1 ATM
