= Kalrayan Hills =

Range of hills in Tamil Nadu, India

Kalvarayan Hills
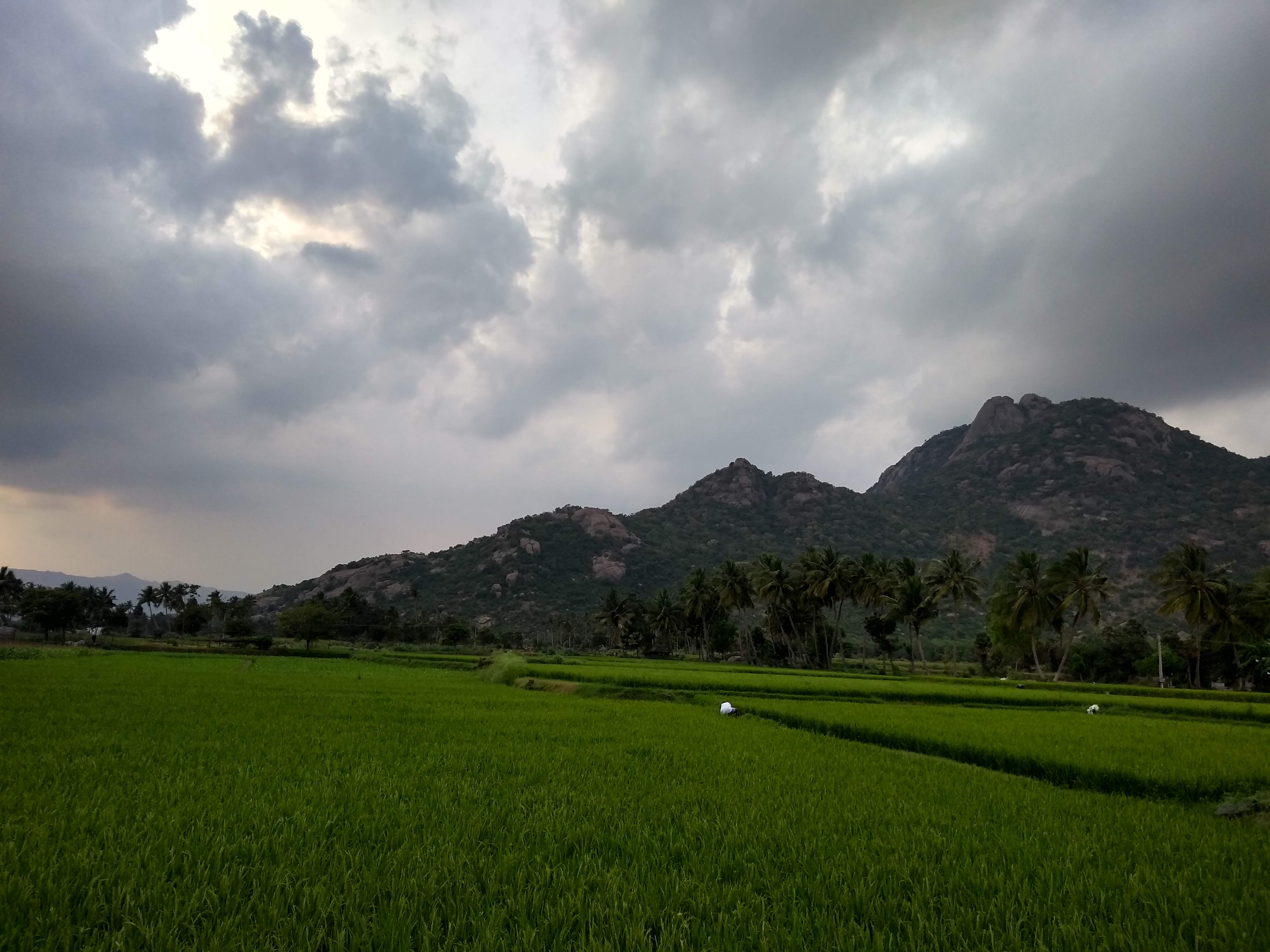
- View of Kalvarayan Hills from Arasampattu

Highest point
- Elevation: 609.6–914.4 m (2,000–3,000 ft)
- Coordinates: 11°51′0″N 78°38′0″E

Dimensions
- Area: 1,095 km^{2} (423 mi^{2})

Geography
- Location within Tamil Nadu
- Location: Kallakurichi District, Tamil Nadu, India
- Parent range: Eastern Ghats

The Kalvarayan Hills (also spelled Kalrayan hills) are a major range of hills situated in the Eastern Ghats of the southern Indian state of Tamil Nadu. Along with the Pachaimalai, Alavaimalai, Javadi, and Shevaroy hills, they separate the Kaveri River basin to the south from the Palar River basin to the north. The hills range in height from 2000 feet to 3000 feet and extend over an area of 1095 square kilometres.

== Geography ==
The hills straddle a number of Tamil Nadu districts, extending northeast from the Salem District. The range serves as a boundary between the Salem and Kallakurichi districts. The Kalrayans are divided into two sections — the northern section, referred to as the Chinna ("little") Kalrayans, and the southern section, called the Periya ("big") Kalrayans. The Chinna Kalrayans average 2700 feet in height, while the Periya Kalrayans average 4000 feet.

The range as a whole is fairly smooth, with soil well-suited for plant growth. Shrubs and bushes in the jungle can reach up to 400 metres in altitude, while deciduous forests can be found between above 800 metres. Shola, a type of high-altitude stunted evergreen forest, can be found growing on isolated plateaus. Though the forest stand is growing, due to "habitat uniqueness, human impacts and cultural tradition," conservation efforts are needed. There are ten water falls in the Kalarayan Hills and when the people comes to visit during the winter season only water flow on the falls .The way to the falls are unsafe and it does not have any proper roads and it does not safety for the people.The climate are moderate highly 27 °C and lowly 19 °C. The top of the hills where the roads are like a jeep road only .In the hills being people's are called tribal (Malayali). There are more than 180 villages are here.

== History ==
The History of Kalrayan hills with its Jaghirdars run back to the time of Krishnadevaraya the Emperor of ‘Vijaya Nagar Kingdom’. It is told in the inscription, that Krishnadevaraya had gifted the hills to Kurumba Gounder, Sadaya Gounder and Ariya Gounder. About the hill tribes, The Kalavara Kurumba warriors migrated from Kanchivaram, settled in the Kalavaraya hills, and married the local hunting Kurumba Gounder girls of their clan. The communities of karalar and kurumbar who at present are called ‘Malayali’ and they call themselves as "Gounders" one of the title from kurumba Gounders

=== Historic Administration ===
Kalvarayan hills, a hill range of eastern ghats, spanning present day Salem, Kallakurichi and Villupuram district of Tamil Nadu under the traditional system of Jagir's. The hills were divided into five territorial divisions, known as Nadu, which means country in Tamil.

1. Jadaya Kavundan Nadu
2. Kurumba Kavundan Nadu
3. Ariya Kavundan Nadu
4. Chinna Kalrayan Nadu
5. Periya Kalrayan Nadu

The three principal Nads, such as Jadaya Goundan Nad, Kurumba Kavundan Nad, and Ariya Kavundan Nad were ruled by three tribal chieftains or Jagirdhars ( also known as Poligars) - Sadaya Goundan, Kurumba Goundan and Arya Goundan respectively. As per 1901 census, Sadaya Goundan had 40 villages with a population of 10,009, Kurumba Goundan had 40 villages with a population of 7,490 and Arya Goundan had 11 villages with 2,318 people.

Kalvarayan Hills which is under Salem districts has two as Chinna Kalvarayan and Periya Kalvarayan Hills. Both the hills ruled by Jagirdhars/Durai. Chinna Kalvarayan capital is Maniyara Gundam ruled by Ponnudurai ancestors and Periya Kalvarayan capital is Kovilputhur/Koilputhur by Ramasamy Durai, LasumanaDurai and their heirs, even now. As per 2001 population Chinna Kalvarayan over 20,000 and Periya Kalvarayan 15,000 populations. The community had wedding tax, cultivation tax, registration of births and deaths, and everyone had to offer gifts to jagirdhar's families during Pongal celebrations. Till 25 June 1976 the area was "not part of India, as there was no presence of governance or any government till then". The three jagirdhars were not willing to recognise the government of India and abide by its statutes by handing over 105 villages under them. The hill was brought under the government control on 25 June 1976 by invoking slavery abolition legislation, 1963.
