= Edappadi =

- Town
- Location in Tamil Nadu, India
- Coordinates: 11.58°N 77.85°E
- Country: India
- State: Tamil Nadu
- District: Salem

Government
  - Type: First Grade Municipality
  - Body: Edappadi Municipality
- Elevation: 239 m (784 ft)

Population (2011)
  - Total: 55,385

Languages
  - Official: Tamil
  - Spoken: Tamil
- Time zone: UTC+5:30 (IST)
- PIN: 637101,637102
- Telephone code: (91)04283
- Vehicle registration: TN-52

Edappadi (also spelt Idaippadi) is a municipality in the Salem district in the state of Tamil Nadu, India. Edappadi was once known for its thriving power loom industry. The economy is diversified by agriculture, heavy truck transport, granite, entertainment and foundries.

The rocks around Edappadi are expected to contain rare minerals.

== Etymology ==
The name is derived from the family name 'idayar', which means the people who survived with cows, buffalo and house animals.

== Geography ==
Edappadi is located at 11.58°N 77.85°E.

The Sarabanga River, originating from Shevaroy Hills passes through the town of Edappadi. After developments and urbanization, the river has dried and become more of a sewage canal. The Cauvery River flows 6 km away from Edappadi.

Edappadi's water is supplied by the Cauvery River and 'Periya-yeri' (Big-lake) near the town. It is surrounded by many lakes, including Periyayeri, ChettiarYeri, Punka-yeri, Reddipatti-Yeri, Kavadikaranoor-Yeri (Aachampalli Yeri).

=== Topography ===
Edappadi has an average elevation of 288 m (945 ft). It is situated at the basin of a hill called 'Soorieya malai' (Mountain of Sun). The mountain does not have any plants due to its rocky and unusual properties. Research done by Periyar University Geologist shows it consists of rare radioactive minerals. Edappadi has a variable terrain. The Sankagiri-Edappadi route via Veerappam Palayam and Sunnambukkuttai is rocky.

== Location ==
Edappadi is located in the Salem District of the state of Tamilnadu. It is one of the most important textile areas. It is situated 43 km from the West of Salem city. The major geographical features of the region include the Sarabanga River and Soriyankaradu Mountain, which is 5 km away from the town.

Edappadi is spread over an area of 28.22 km^{2}.

== Climate ==
The climate in Edappadi is very hot in the summer and mildly cooler in the winter. The monsoon rain starts around October to November. May and June are windy when the summer rainy season begins.

== Demographics ==
Religious census
Religion	Percent(%)
Hindu	96.1%
Muslim	3.03%
Christian	0.72%
Sikh	0.01%
Buddhist	0.0%
Jain	0.0%
Other	0.13%
No religion	0.0%

According to 2011 census, Edappadi had a population of 54,823 with a sex-ratio of 946 females for every 1,000 males, much more than the national average of 929. A total of 5,411 people were under the age of six, constituting 2,759 males and 2,652 females. Scheduled castes and scheduled tribes accounted for 7.62% and .01% of the population respectively. The average literacy of the town was 64.67%, compared to the national average of 72.99%. The town had a total of 14,560 households. There were a total of 27,764 workers, comprising 1,327 cultivators, 4,140 main agricultural labourers, 2,071 in household industries, 19,257 other workers, 969 marginal workers, 30 marginal cultivators, 129 marginal agricultural labors, 114 marginal workers in household industries and 696 other marginal workers. As per the religious census of 2011, 96.1% of Edappadi's population were Hindus, 3.03% were Muslims, 0.72% were Christians, 0.01% Sikhs, 0.0% Buddhists, 0.0% Jains, 0.13% following other religions and 0.0% were following no religion or did not indicate any religious preference.

=== Festival ===
Edappadi has a festival celebration every year: "kavadi padhayathirai", held by the Vanniyar and Meenavar communities. The festival follows 370 years of tradition. People from Edappadi go to the dharishanam of Palani Murugan Temple at Palani.

== Economy ==
The economy of the town revolves around the manufacture of towels and lungis.

Most of the population depends on agriculture and power loom weaving. Thousands of power looms stand idle due to workforce migration in search of higher pay in other industries. A lack of irrigation projects has led to frequent droughts even though the large Cauvery river flows just 10 km away from the town. Former Chief Minister Edappadi K. Palaniswami proposed a diversion of 0.5tmcft of Mettur surplus water to the Salem tanks for a total cost of 565 Crores. The above scheme could bring irrigation to land in the Edappadi and Sankari taluks that was previously without irrigation, which would help enable sustainability for the people in the area.

== Transport ==
By air

The nearest airport is Salem Airport, situated 38 km from Edappadi.

By rail

The nearest railway station is Sankari Durg, located 16 km away.

By road

Edappadi is well-connected by road with major cities in Tamil Nadu. A new outer ring road was constructed around Edappadi, which connects Edappadi to Sankari Road, Salem Road, Jalakandapuram Road, Poolampatti Road, Koneripatti Road, and Komarapalayam Road to avoid more traffic in town. The Edappadi bus stand is situated in the center of the town. Tamil Nadu State Transport Corporation, Salem provides daily bus services from Edappadi to Chennai, Bengaluru, Coimbatore, Trichy, Madurai, Kumbakonam, Chidambaram, and Hosur.

== Education ==
The Government Boys Higher Secondary School is one of Edappadi's oldest schools. It has the second biggest playground in the Salem Dt.

The following are also local schools:

- Amala Matriculation Higher Secondary School
- AGN Matric Hr. Sec. School, Konganapuram
- Universal Public School
- Government Boys Higher Secondary School
- Government Girls Higher Secondary School
- Saraswathi Vidhyalaya Nursery & Primary School
- SKT Higher Secondary School
- Acharya Group of Institutions
- Reliance Matriculation School
- Universal Matriculation School, Konangkuttaiyur
- Wisdom Matriculation Higher Secondary School
- St Marys Matriculation School, V.valasai
- Kalaimagal nursery and primary school
- Kalaimagal Vidhyasaram matriculation school

Periyar University Constituent Arts & Science College has been functioning in Edappadi since 2016. It was inaugurated by Government of Tamil Nadu Late Chief Minister Dr. J. Jayalalithaa. More than 1200 students were studying in the Arts & Science College. The Vidhyaa Arts and Science College is in the Konganapuram Idappadi Taluk Salem District.
