= Pethanaickenpalayam =

- Panchayat town
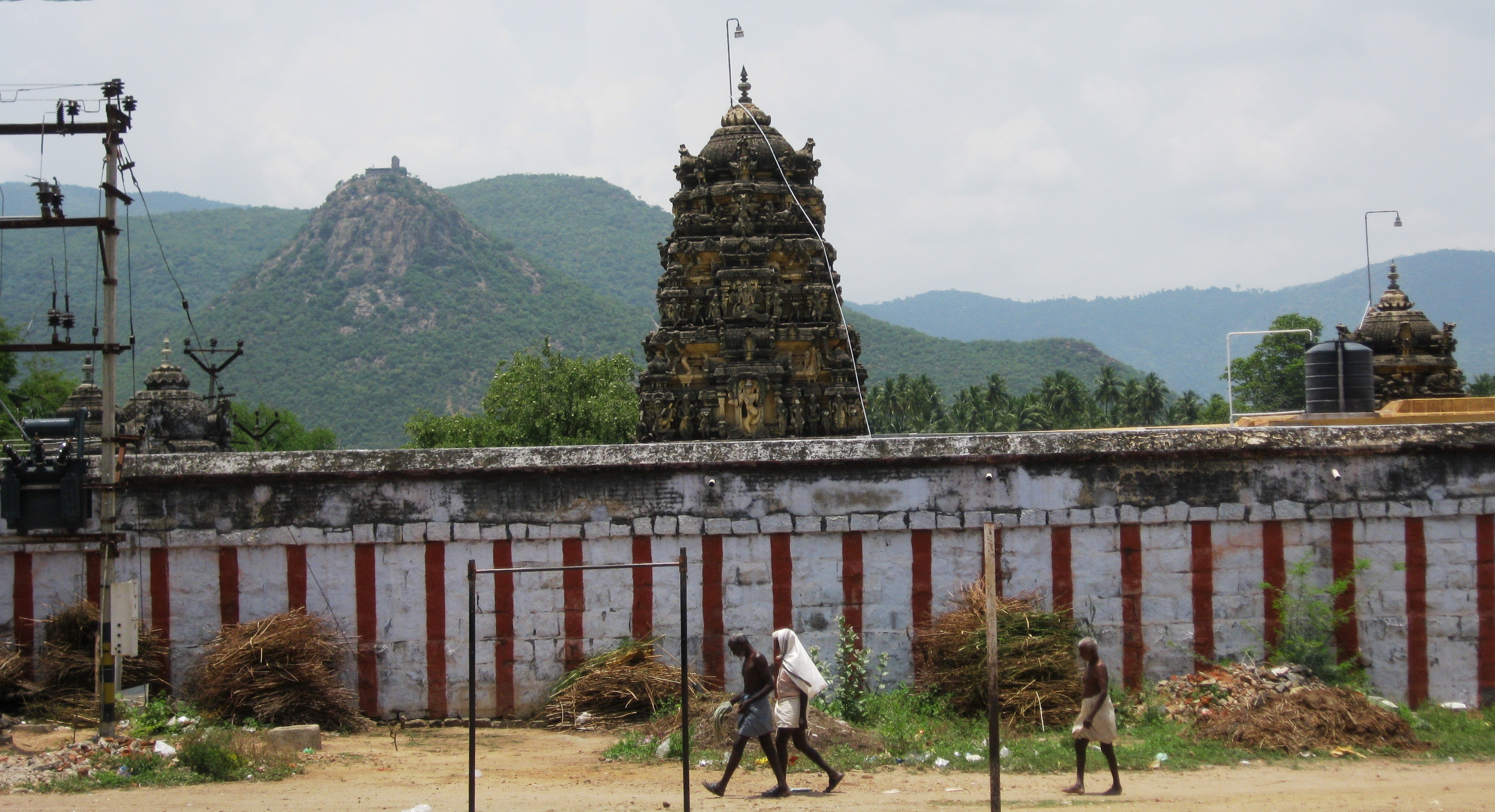

- Location in Tamil Nadu, India
- Coordinates: 11°38′56″N 78°30′28″E
- Country: India
- State: Tamil Nadu
- District: Salem
- Taluk: Pethanaickenpalayam

Area
  - Total: 12.9 km^{2} (5.0 sq mi)

Population (2011)
  - Total: 17,678
  - Density: 1,370/km^{2} (3,550/sq mi)

Languages
  - Official: Tamil
- Time zone: UTC+5:30 (IST)

Pethanaickenpalayam is a panchayat town and taluk in Salem district in the Indian state of Tamil Nadu. It is one of the 31 panchayat towns in the district. Spread across an area of 12.9 km^{2} (5.0 sq mi), it had a population of 17,678 individuals as per the 2011 census.

== Geography and administration ==
Pethanaickenpalayam is the headquarters of the namesake taluk of Salem district in the Indian state of Tamil Nadu. Spread across an area of 12.9 km^{2} (5.0 sq mi), it is one of the 31 panchayat towns in the district.

The town panchayat is headed by a chairperson, who is elected by the members, who are chosen through direct elections. The town forms part of the Attur Assembly constituency that elects its member to the Tamil Nadu legislative assembly and the Kallakurichi Lok Sabha constituency that elects its member to the Parliament of India.

== Demographics ==
As per the 2011 census, Pethanaickenpalayam had a population of 17,678 individuals across 4,611 households. The population saw a marginal increase compared to the previous census in 2001 when 16,398 inhabitants were registered. The population consisted of 8,768 males and 8,910 females. About 1,778 individuals were below the age of six years. About 36.8% of the population belonged to scheduled castes. The entire population is classified as urban. The town has an average literacy rate of 73.6%.

About 42.4% of the eligible population were employed full-time, of which majority were involved in agriculture and allied activities. Hinduism was the majority religion which was followed by 98.1% of the population, with Islam (1.7%) and Christianity (0.2%) being minor religions.
