= Konganapuram =

- Panchayat town
- Location in Tamil Nadu, India
- Coordinates: 11.58°N 77.92°E
- Country: India
- State: Tamil Nadu
- District: Salem

Area
  - Total: 9.6 km^{2} (3.7 sq mi)

Population (2011)
  - Total: 9,286
  - Density: 970/km^{2} (2,500/sq mi)

Languages
  - Official: Tamil
- Time zone: UTC+5:30 (IST)

Konganapuram is a panchayat town in Idappadi taluk of Salem district in the Indian state of Tamil Nadu. It is one of the 31 panchayat towns in the district. Spread across an area of 9.6 km^{2} (3.7 sq mi), it had a population of 9,286 individuals as per the 2011 census.

== Geography and administration ==
Konganapuram is located in Idappadi taluk of Salem district in the Indian state of Tamil Nadu. Spread across an area of 9.6 km^{2} (3.7 sq mi), it is one of the 31 panchayat towns in the district. The region has a tropical climate with hot summers and mild winters. The highest temperatures are recorded in April and May, with lowest recordings in December-January.

The town panchayat was established in 1954. It was upgraded to second grade in 1967, first grade in 1981, and selection grade in 1985. It is sub-divided into 15 wards. The town panchayat is headed by a chairperson, who is elected by the members, who are chosen through direct elections. The town forms part of the Edappadi Assembly constituency that elects its member to the Tamil Nadu legislative assembly and the Salem Lok Sabha constituency that elects its member to the Parliament of India.

== Demographics ==
As per the 2011 census, Konganapuram had a population of 9,286 individuals across 2,614 households. The population saw a marginal increase compared to the previous census in 2001 when 8,084 inhabitants were registered. The population consisted of 4,721 males and 4,565 females. About 928 individuals were below the age of six years. About 36% of the population belonged to scheduled castes. The entire population is classified as urban. The town has an average literacy rate of 72.1%.

About 42.9% of the eligible population were employed, of which majority were involved in agriculture and allied activities. Hinduism was the majority religion which was followed by 99% of the population, with Christianity (0.7%) and Islam (0.2%) being minor religions.
