= Mettur taluk =

Coordinates: 11.80°N 77.80°E

Mettur taluk is a taluk of Salem district of the Indian state of Tamil Nadu. The headquarters of the taluk is the town of Mettur.

== Demographics ==
According to the 2011 census, the taluk of Mettur had a population of 417,460 with 217,182 males and 200,278 females. There were 922 women for every 1000 men. The taluk had a literacy rate of 63.91. Child population in the age group below 6 was 19,653 Males and 17,652 Females.
