= Omlaur Main Road =

Road in Salem, India

- Omlaur Road or OMR
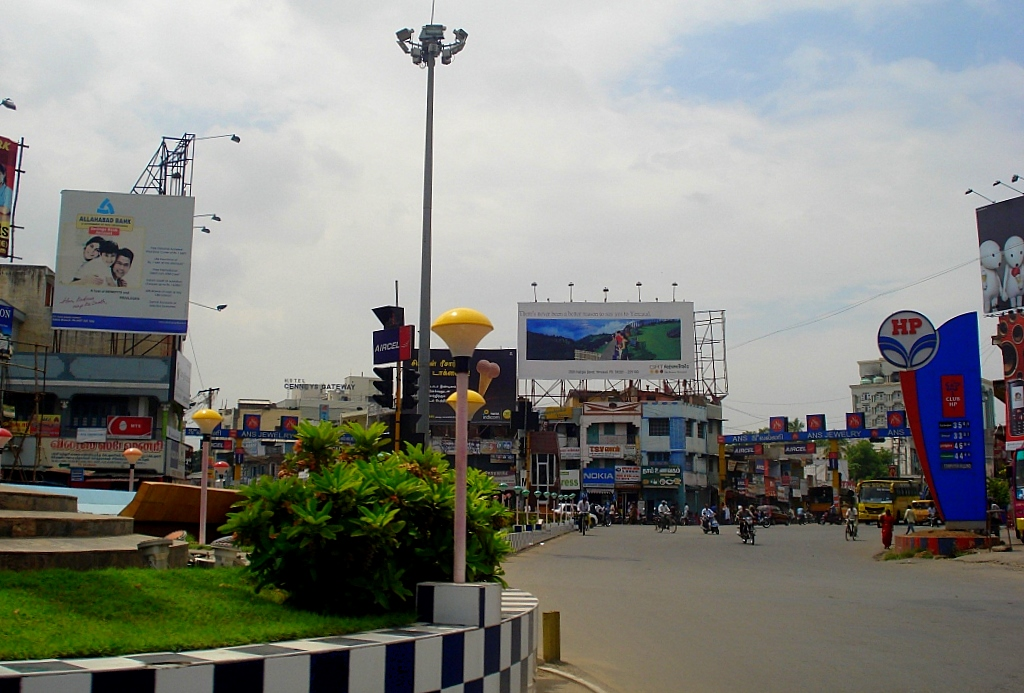
- Old Five Roads Junction, Salem
- Interactive map of Omlaur Main Road
- Maintained by: Highways and Minor Ports Department; Salem City Municipal Corporation
- Coordinates: 11°40′08″N 78°08′31″E
- East end: Salem District Collectorate Roundabout
- Major junctions: Salem Government Hospital; Mahatma Gandhi Stadium; Anna Park; Little Flower Higher Secondary School; Four Roads Junction; Pothys/Shiva Textiles/Mangal & Mangal; MGR Central Bus Terminal; Swarnapuri; Five Roads Junction; D Mart; Sellers hypermarket
- West end: Kuranguchavadi

Omlaur Main Road, is an arterial road in Salem, India. Omlaur Main Road runs from Salem District Collectorate to Kuranguchavadi, it connects National Highway 44 (Srinagar - Kanyakumari via Salem) from the centre of the city. This road connecting Salem airport through NH 44 with Bharat Ratna Dr. M.G.R. Central Bus Stand and Double Decker City Bus Terminus of Salem.

== Description ==
Omlaur Main Road is one of the major arterial road in Salem which connects centre of the city to National Highway 44. This road is a gateway for Bengaluru, Hosur, Krishnagiri, Dharmapuri to the core city of Salem. This road is highly commercialised stretch in Salem.
