= Bhavani Kattalai Hydroelectric Project =

- Location within Tamil Nadu
- Official name: Bhavani Kattalai Hydroelectric Power Generation Project
- Coordinates: 11°23′02.2″N 77°42′44.5″E
- Purpose: Power
- Status: Operational
- Opening date: 1988
- Owner: Government of Tamil Nadu

Dam and spillways
- Type of dam: Barrage
- Impounds: Cauvery River

Power Station
- Commission date: 2013
- Turbines: 3 x 30 MW
- Installed capacity: 90 MW

Bhavani Kattalai Hydroelectric Project is a hydropower generation project in the South Indian state of Tamil Nadu. It is a 90MW power generation project constructed across the Kaveri River. The project area is in the downstream of Lower Mettur Hydroelectric Project. This project consists of three power plants which are located between Bhavani and Pasur, Erode. This hydropower generation project is owned by Government of Tamil Nadu and operated by Tamil Nadu Green Energy Corporation Limited.

== Power Plants ==
This power generation project consists of three power plants totaling to a generating capacity of 90MW. This project uses three Barrage type Dams constructed along the River Kaveri from which it gets the required water current.

- Power Plant-I : Bhavani Kattalai Power Plant-I which consists of one powerhouse located between BP Agraharam in Erode district and Samayasangili in Namakkal district. A Barrage Dam has been constructed across Kaveri in this plant named as Samayasangili Barrage. This plant has a production capacity of 30MW using two turbines of 15MW each.
- Power Plant-II : Bhavani Kattalai Power Plant-II which consists of one powerhouse located between Vendipalayam in Erode district and Odapalli in Namakkal district. The Barrage Dam in this plant named as Vendipalayam Barrage. This plant with a production capacity of 30MW using two turbines of 15MW each has been commissioned in 2011.
- Power Plant-III : Bhavani Kattalai Power Plant-III which consists of one powerhouse located between Pasur in Erode district and Solasiramani in Namakkal district. Solasiramani Barrage plant has a production capacity of 30MW with two turbines each of 15MW capacity.
