= Government Museum, Salem =

- அரசு அருங்காட்சியகம், சேலம்
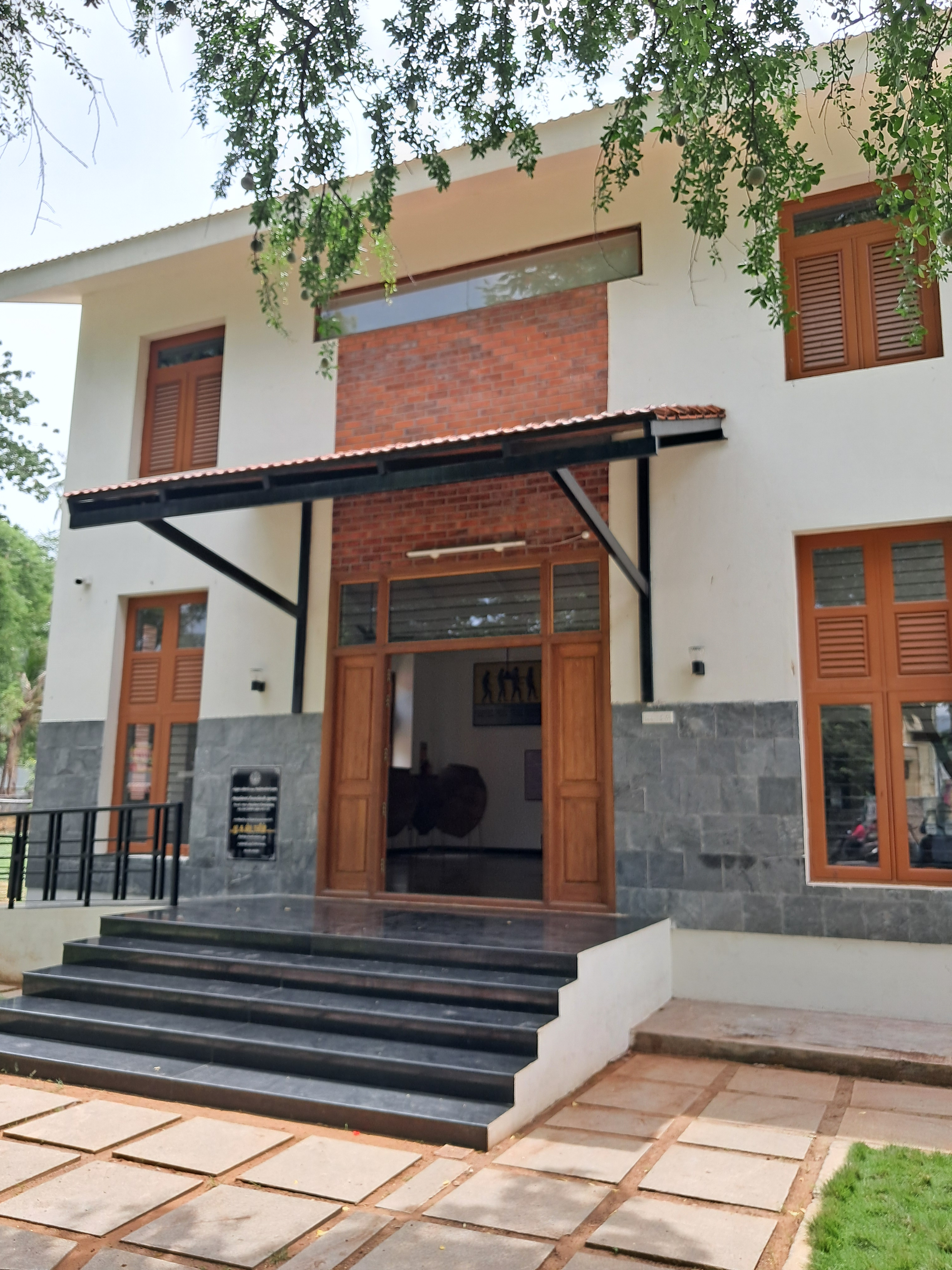
- Entrance
- Established: 1976; 50 years ago
- Location: Kannankurichi Main Road, Hasthampatti, Salem, Tamil Nadu. PIN - 636 016
- Coordinates: 11°40′35.3″N 78°09′44.2″E
- Type: Heritage centre
- Accreditation: Ministry of Culture (India)
- Collections: Stone Age
- Collection size: 2000
- Directors: Principal Secretary & Commissioner of Museums
- Owner: Government of Tamil Nadu
- Public transit access: Bharat Ratna Dr. M.G.R. Central Bus Stand; Salem Junction
- Parking: On site
- Website: govtmuseumchennai.org/district-museum/salem

The Salem Government Museum, located in Salem, Tamil Nadu, India, is a museum dedicated to preserving and showcasing the rich cultural, historical, and artistic heritage of the region. Established in 1976, the museum serves as an educational and cultural resource for both locals and visitors. Also this is first district museum in Tamil Nnadu which is established by peoples.

== History ==
The museum was established by then District Collector Thiru A.M. Swaminathan, I.A.S., with support from the Contemporary Writers and Painters Association, a local artist group. It was officially opened to the public in 1976. Initially, from 1976 to 1979, the museum operated under the District Administration. In 1979, it came under the Department of Museums. From 1979 to 1996, the museum was located at Three Bungalow, and from 1996 to January 2007, it was housed in the Court building. This museum was the first district museum created by and for the people, setting a precedent for the establishment of other district museums.

== Exhibits and collections ==
This museum is home for things used by Namakkal Kavignar V. Ramalingam, including ancient Tamil Coins, pre-independence coins of the Indian Union, Dutch coins, French coins, carved animals, birds, inscriptions, stone idols, wood and metal sculptures, artifacts, ancient Tamil items, Mudhumakkal Thazhi, Nadukal (Veerakal), stone carvings and flint fossils.

This museum exhibits collection of various archeological sculptures from Salem region including Salem, Namakkal, Dharmapuri and Krishnagiri districts.

== New building ==
Since from establishment of museum in Salem, it is functioning in temporary and rental building, in this case TamilNadu government announced, that permanent own building for Salem government museum will built. A new building is ready Hastampatti near Salem taluk office at the cost of ₹3.40 crores. This new building for government museum will have ground floor, first floor and second floor.

== Gallery ==
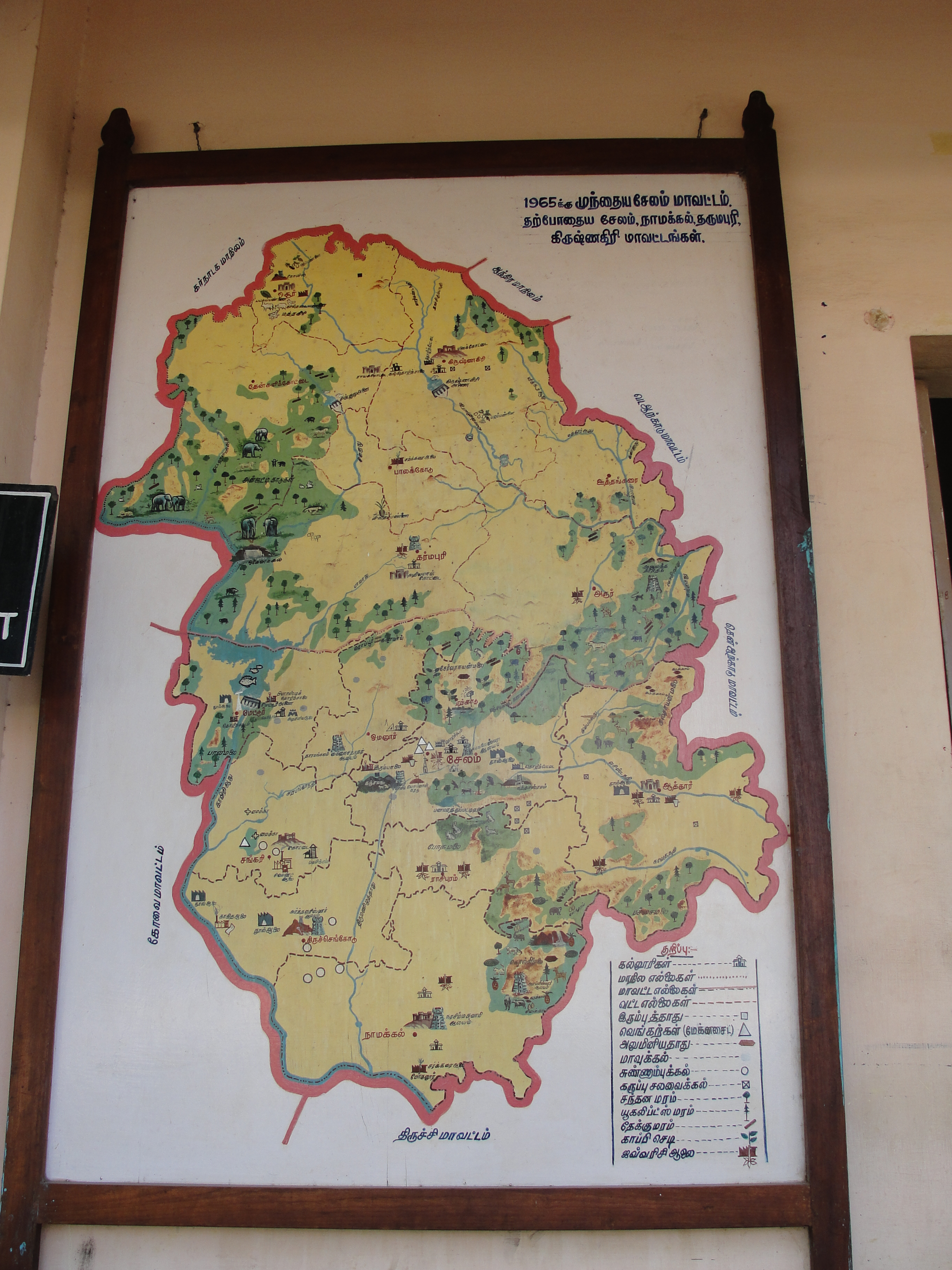
Salem district in 1965

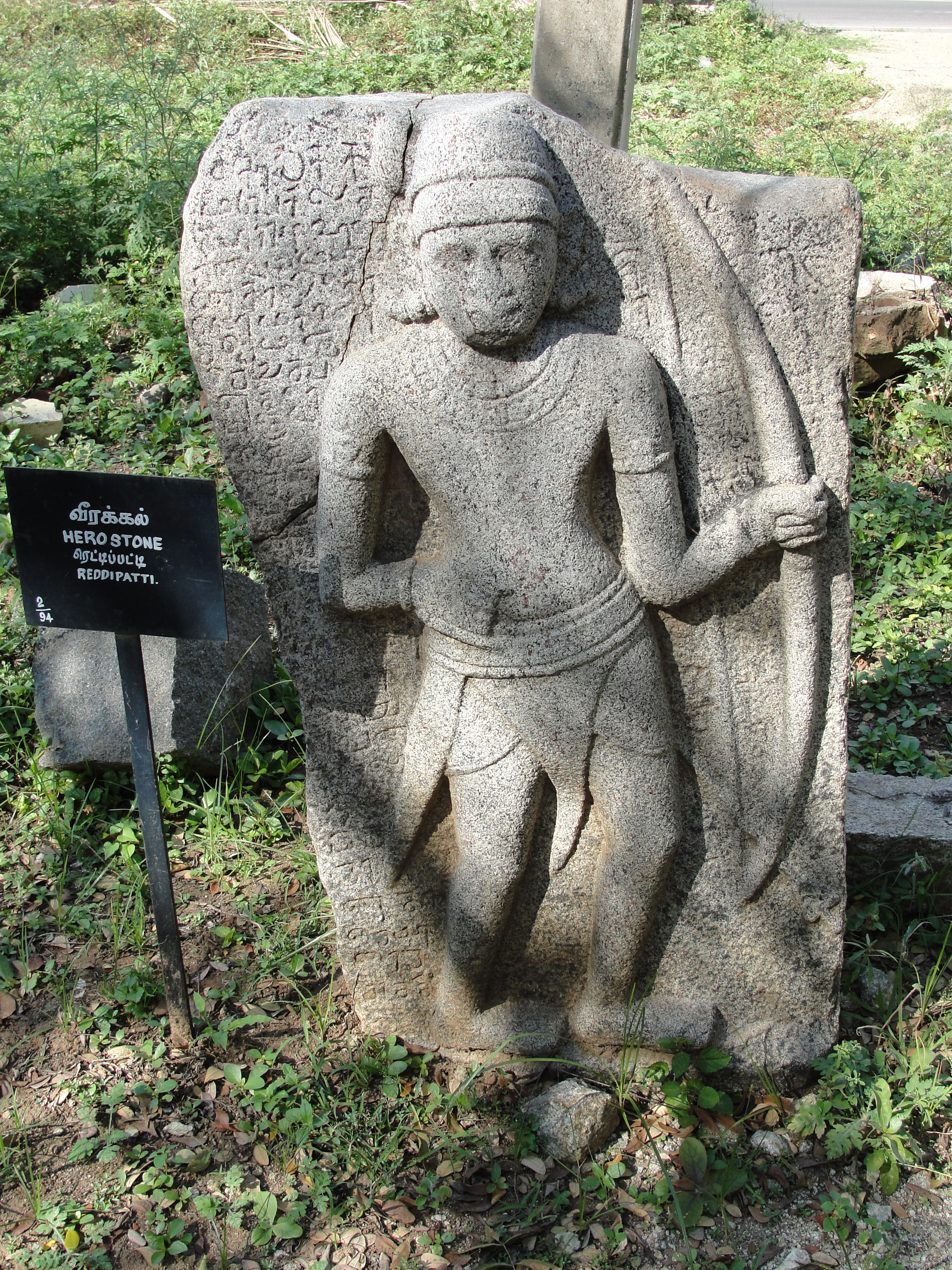
Hero stone

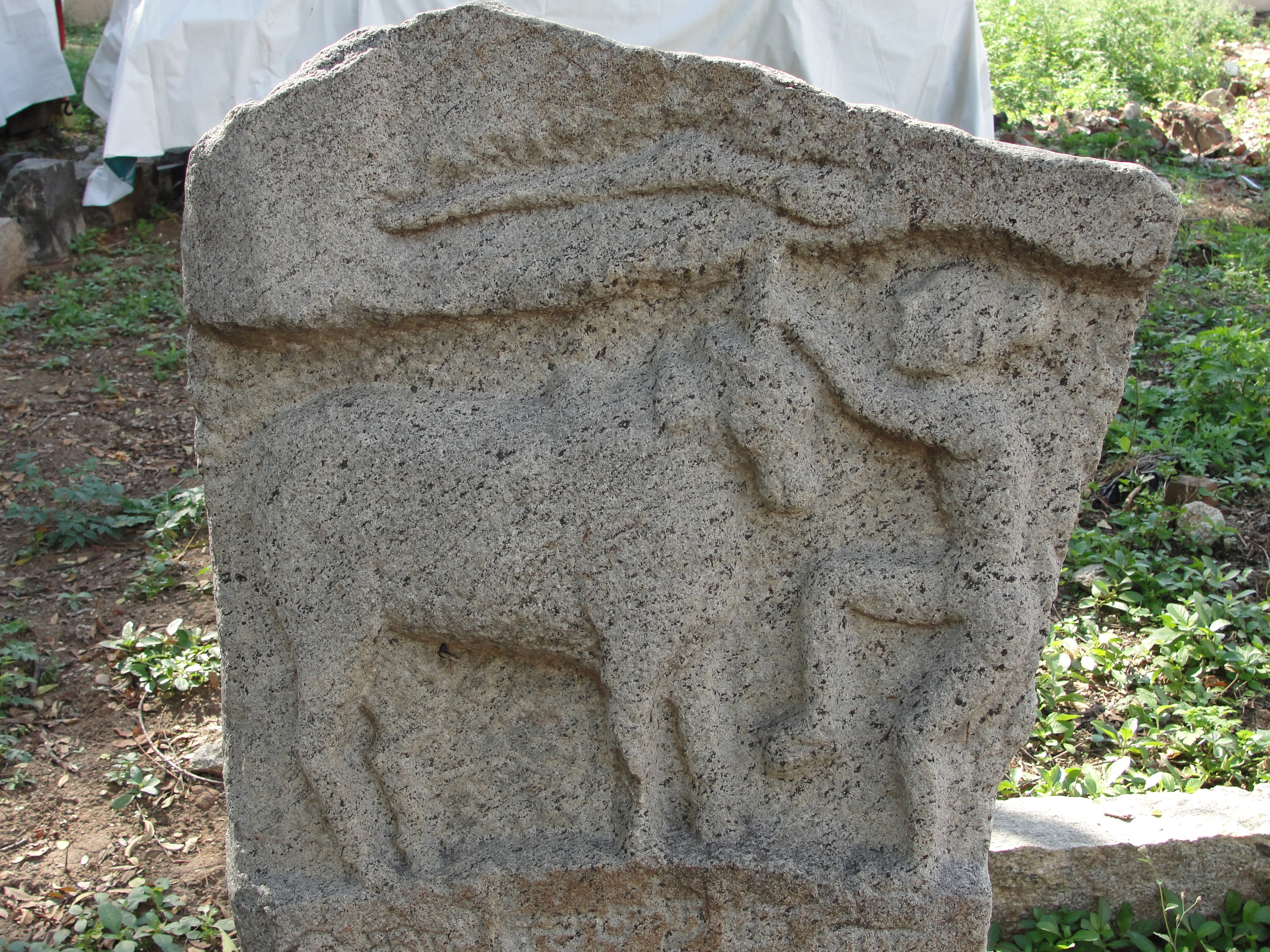
Bull baiting

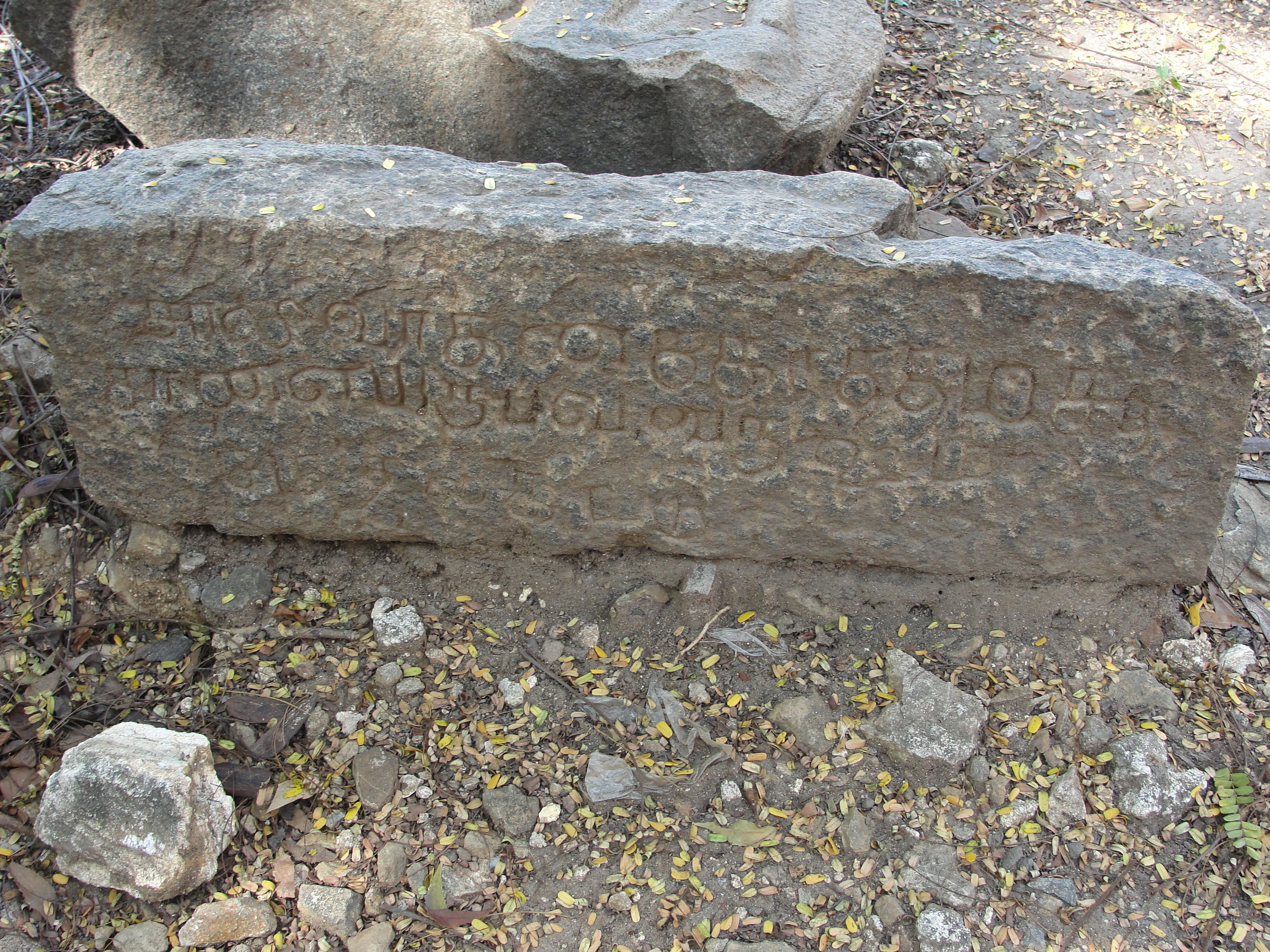
Inscription

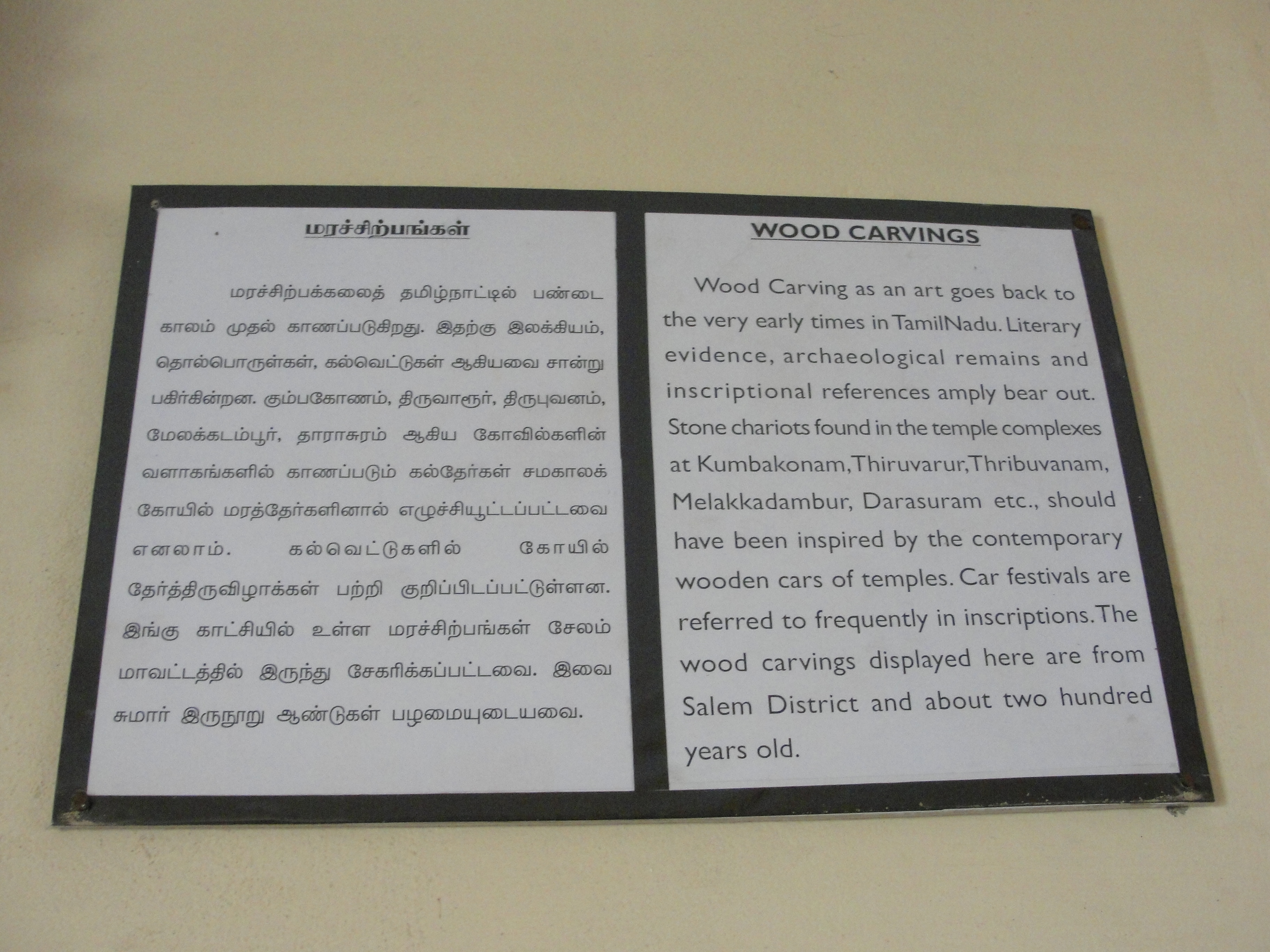
A display on wood carvings

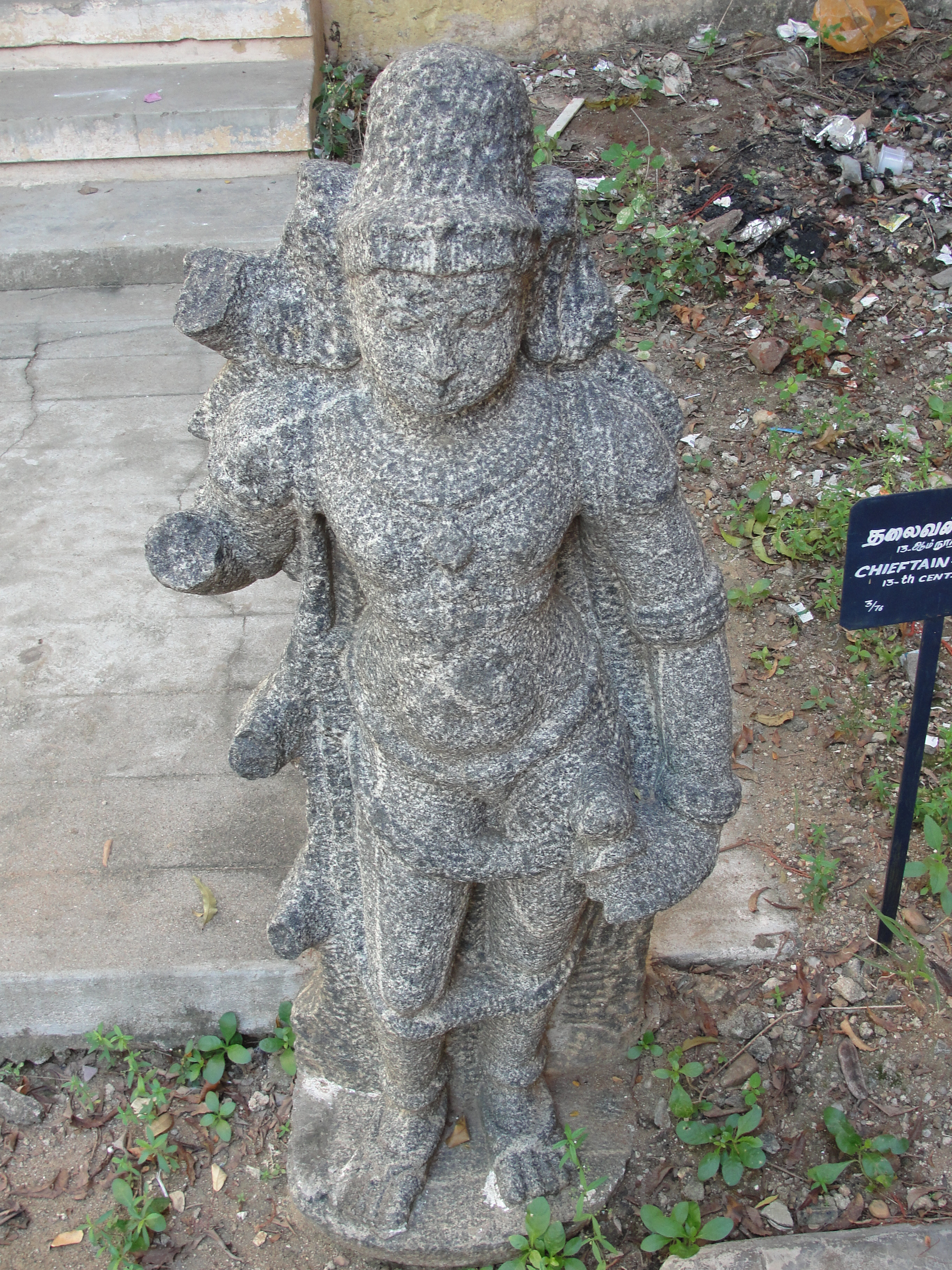
13th century-A Chieftain

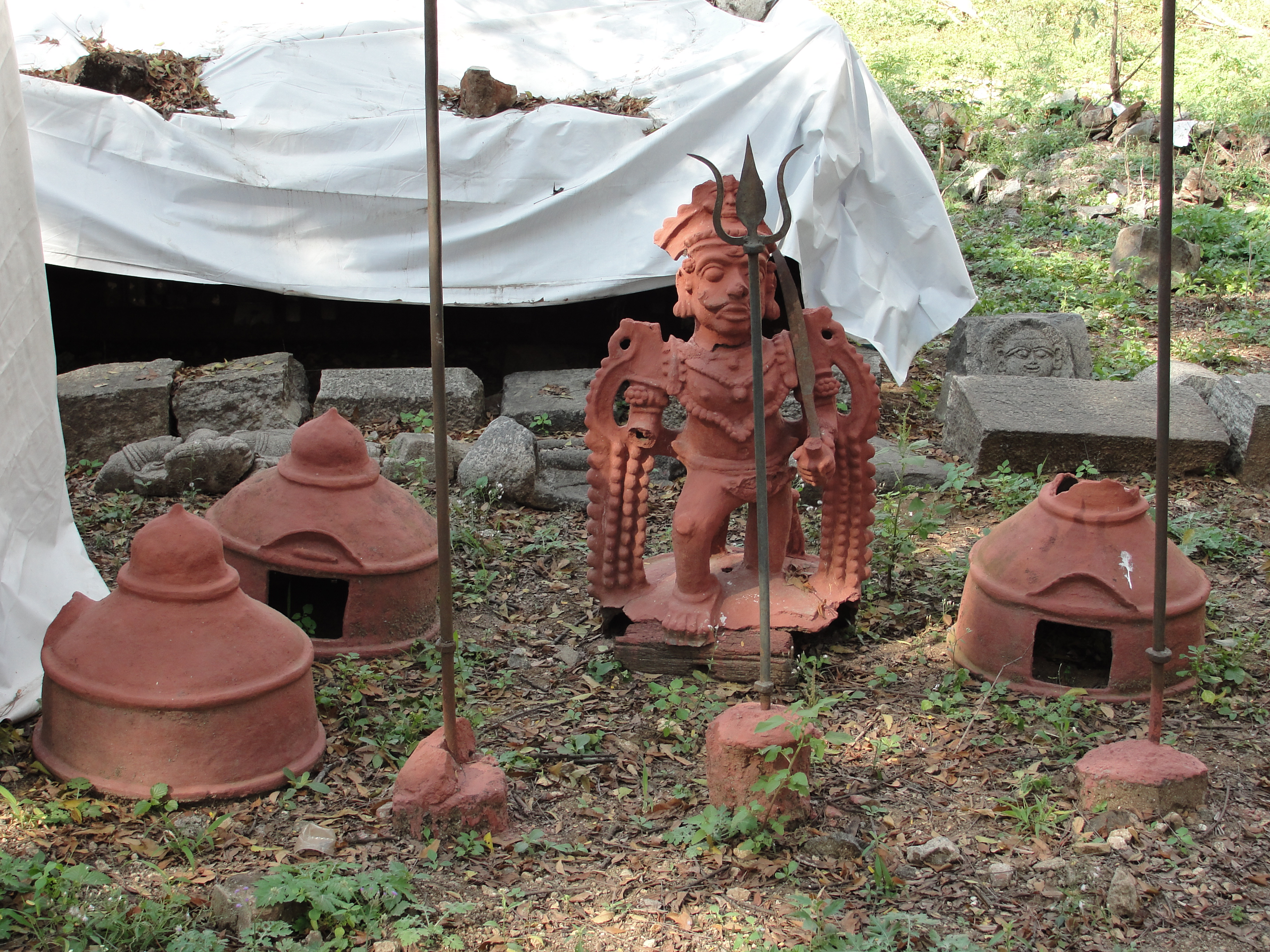
A aesthetic terracotta

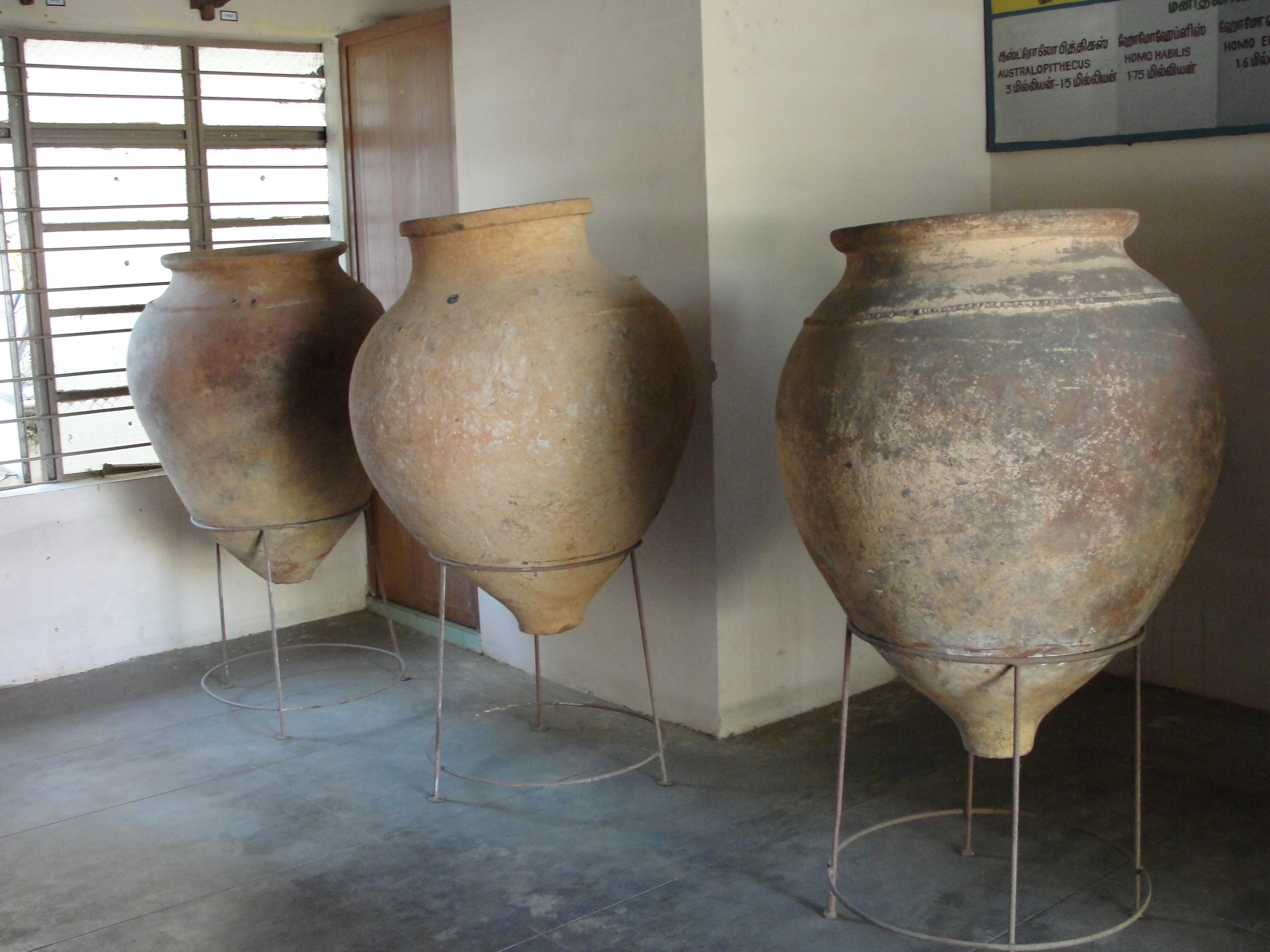
A aldermen earthen vessel

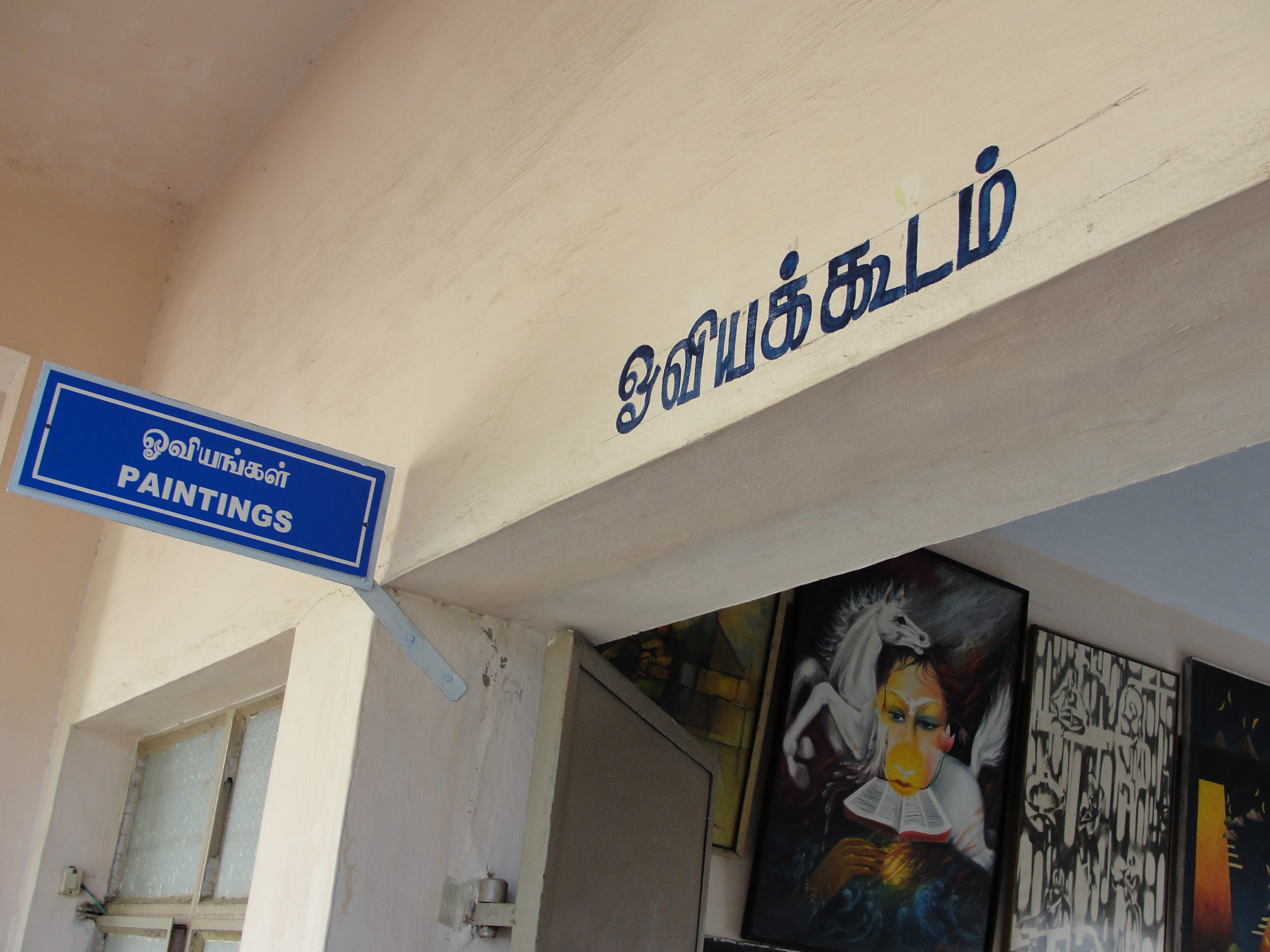
Art gallery

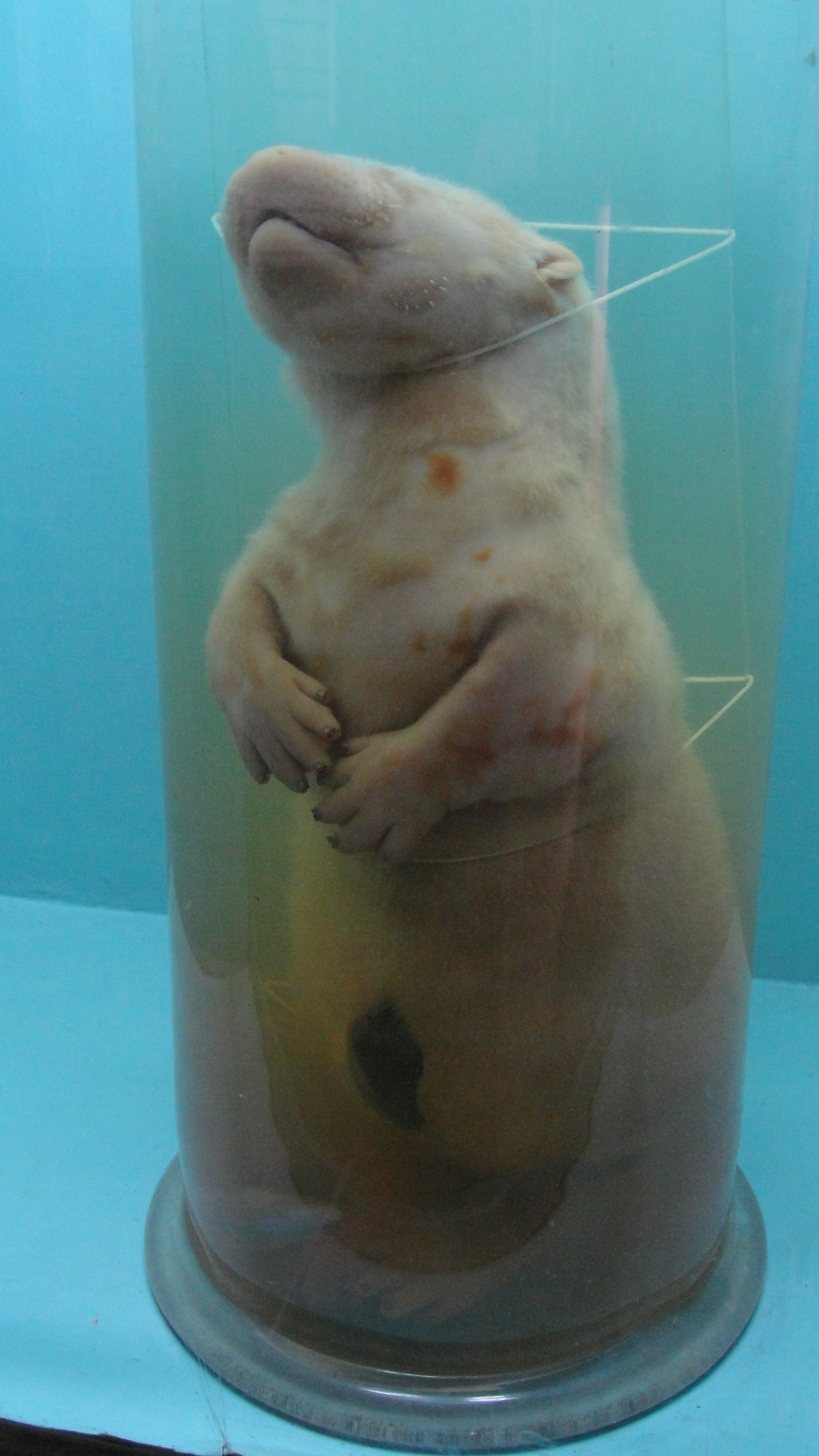
closeup of Water dog

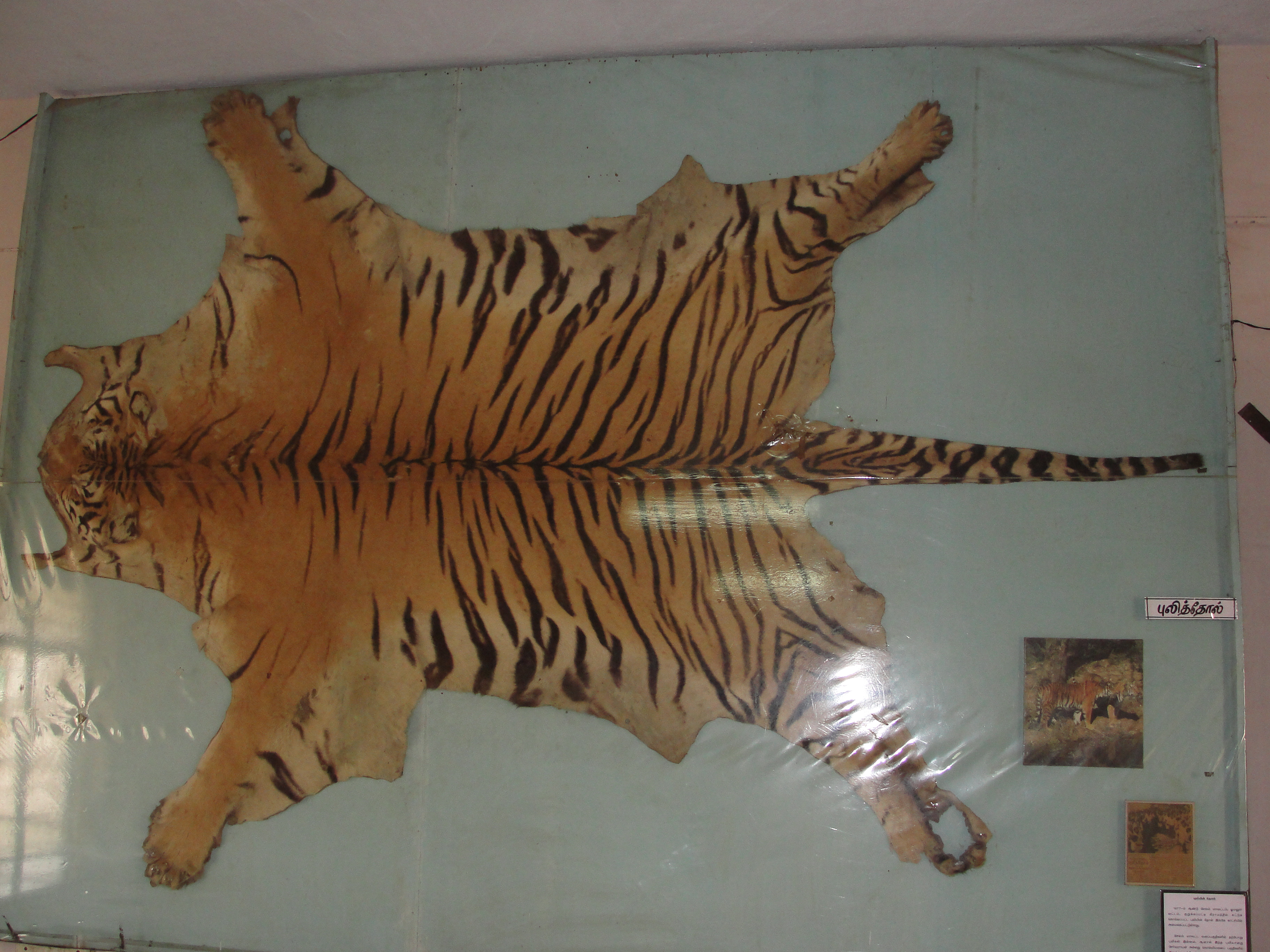
A depiction of processed skin of Tiger

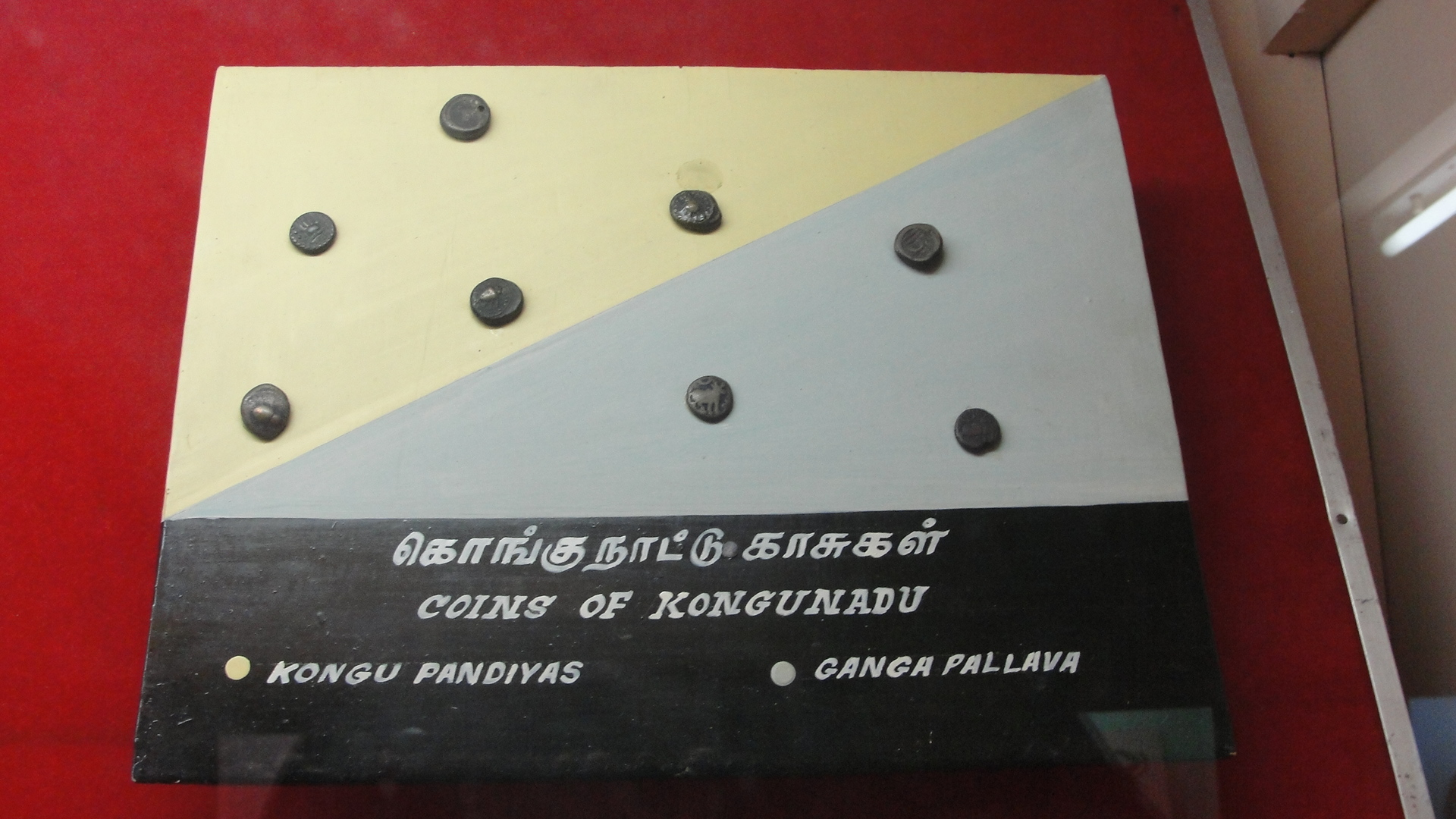
A board of Coins of Kongu Nadu

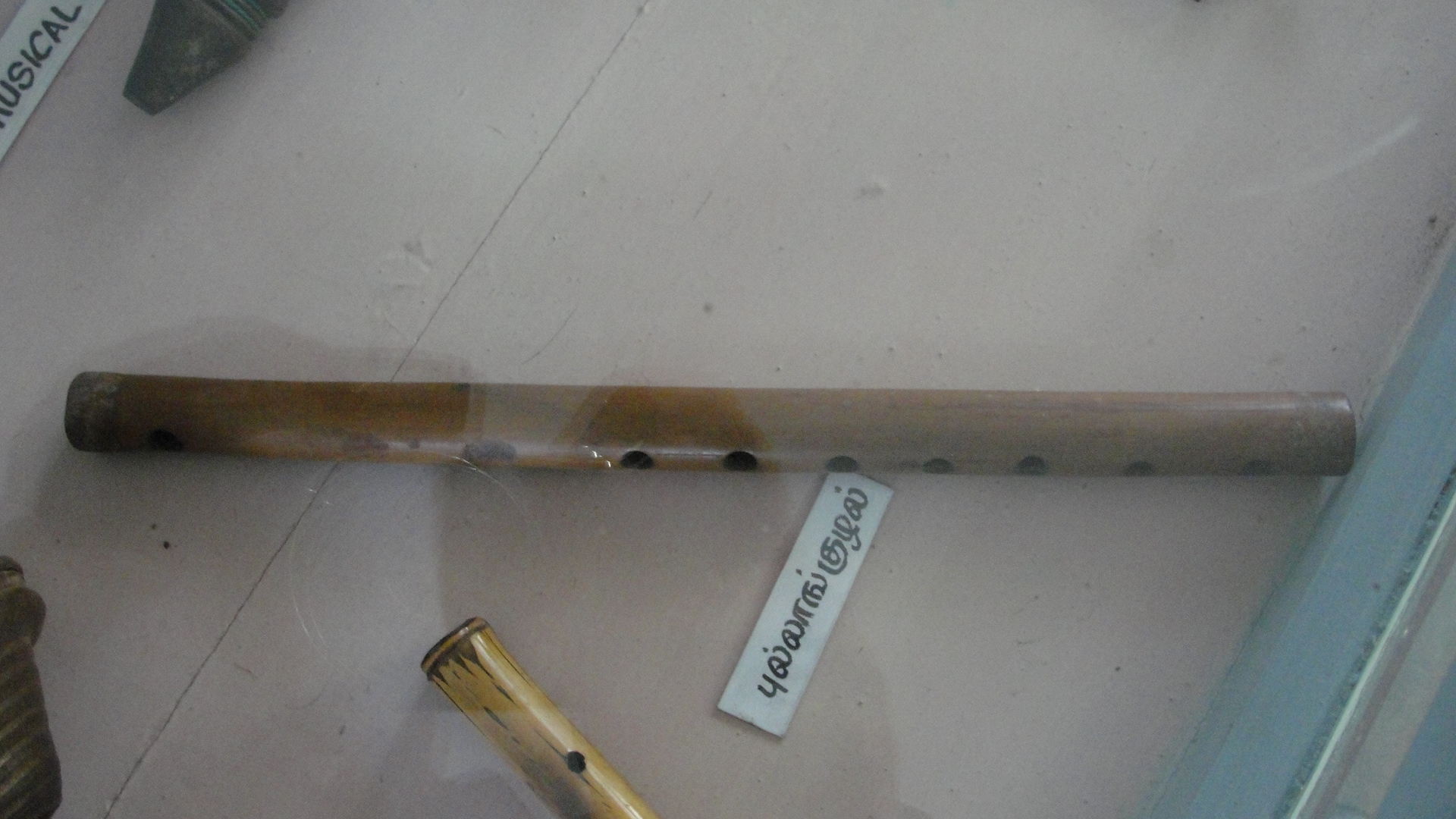
A closeup of flute

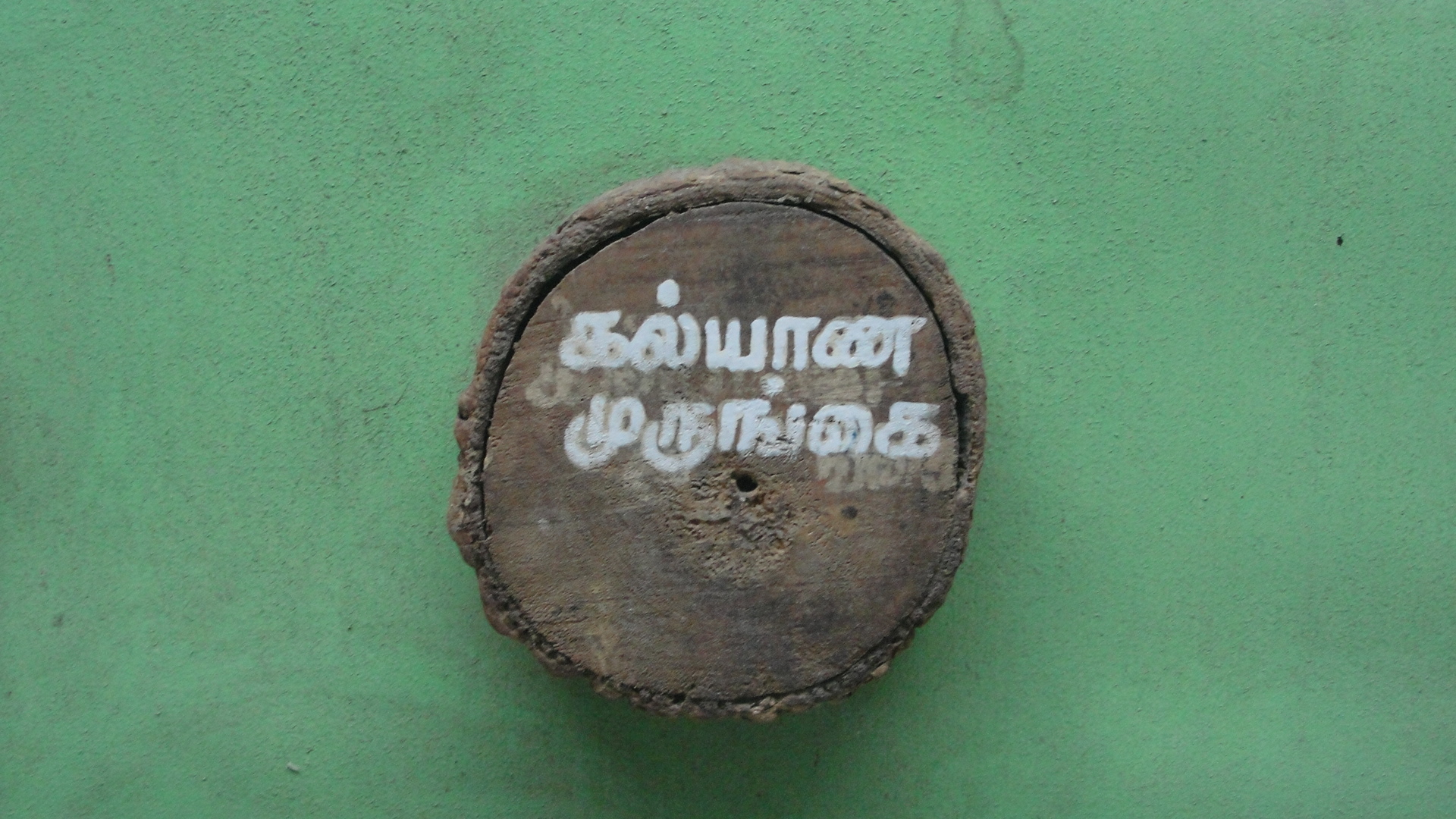
Kalyaana Murungai wood sample

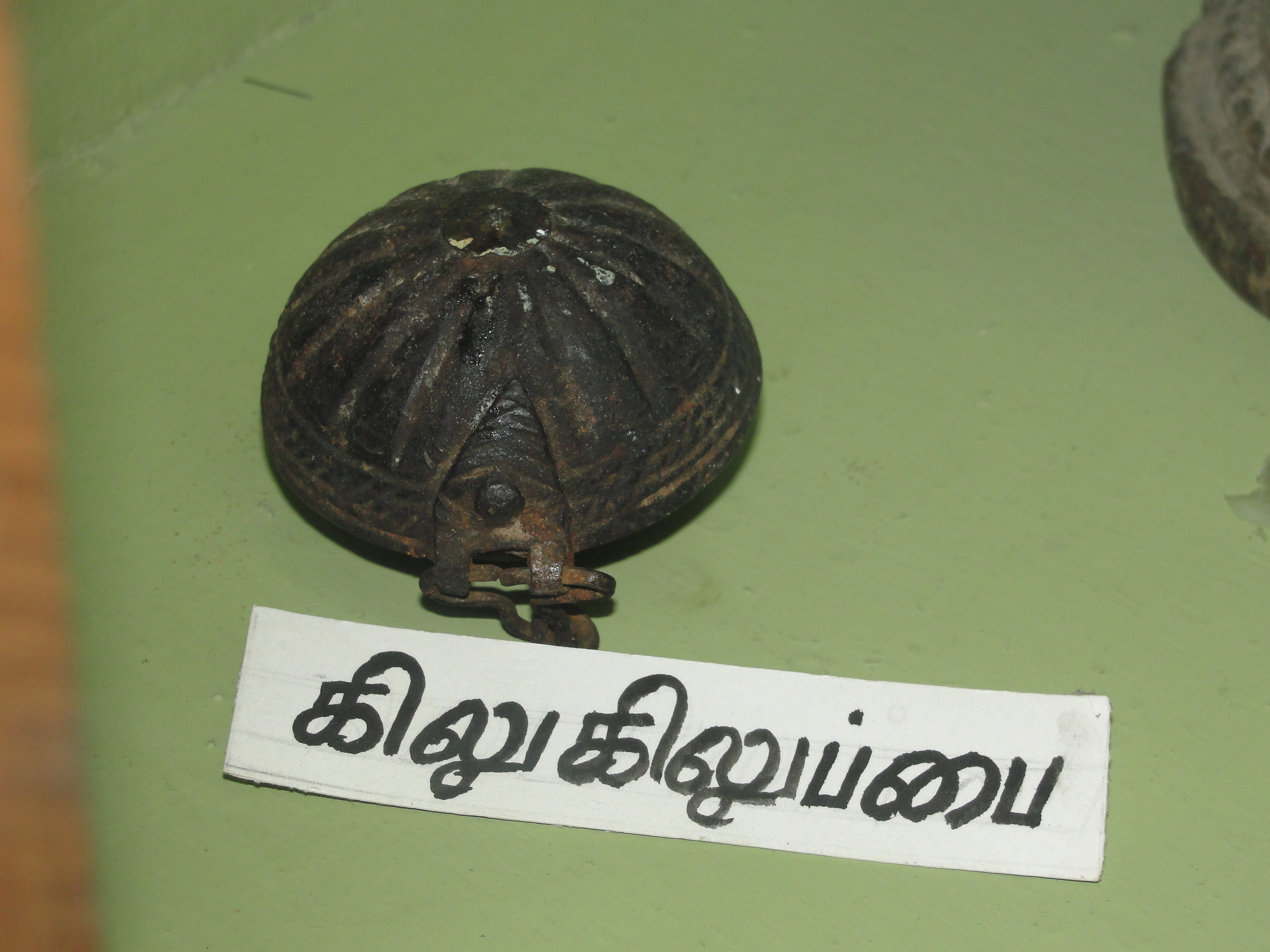
A depiction of Kilukiluppai

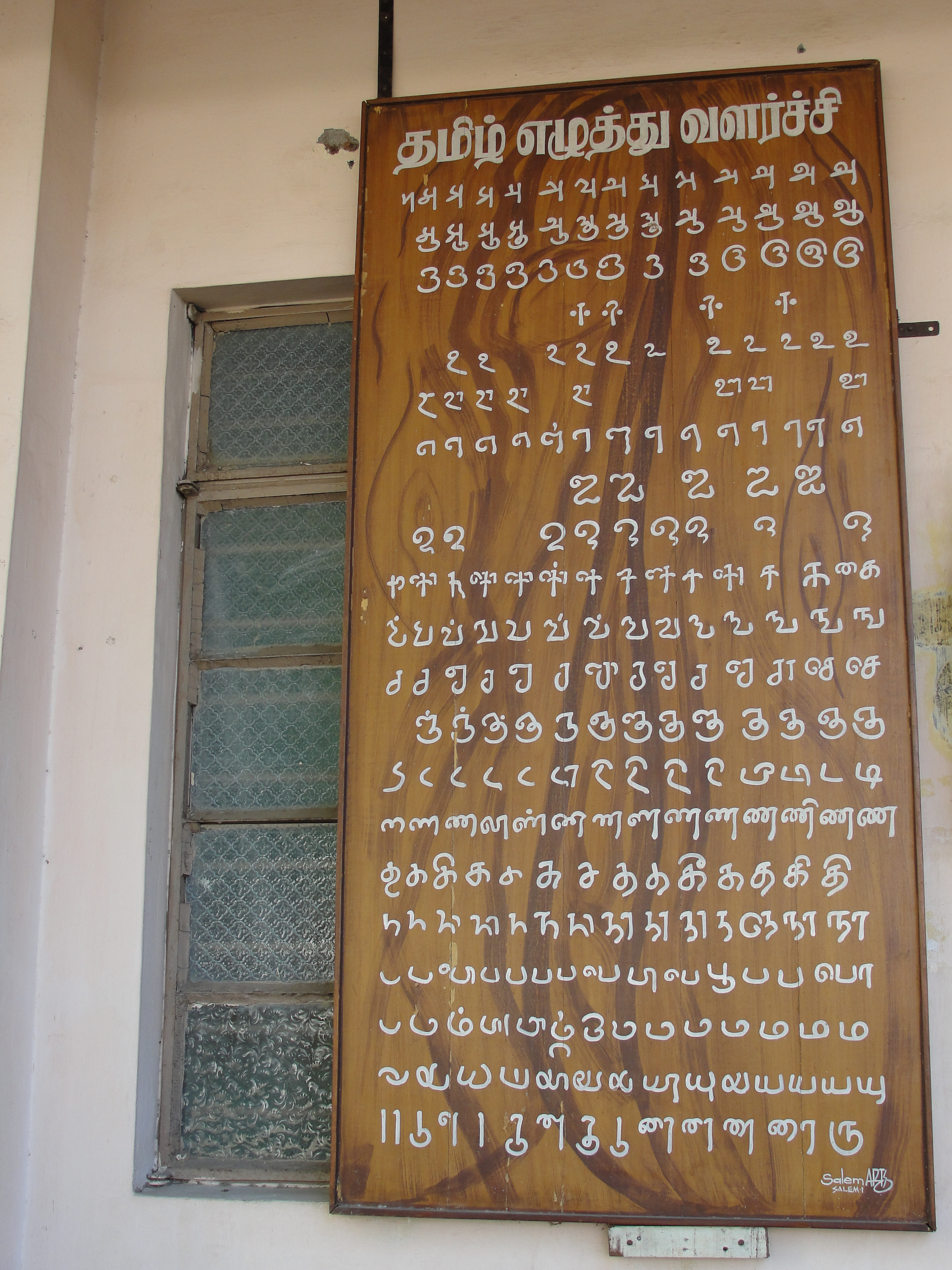
A board on development of Tamil scrip

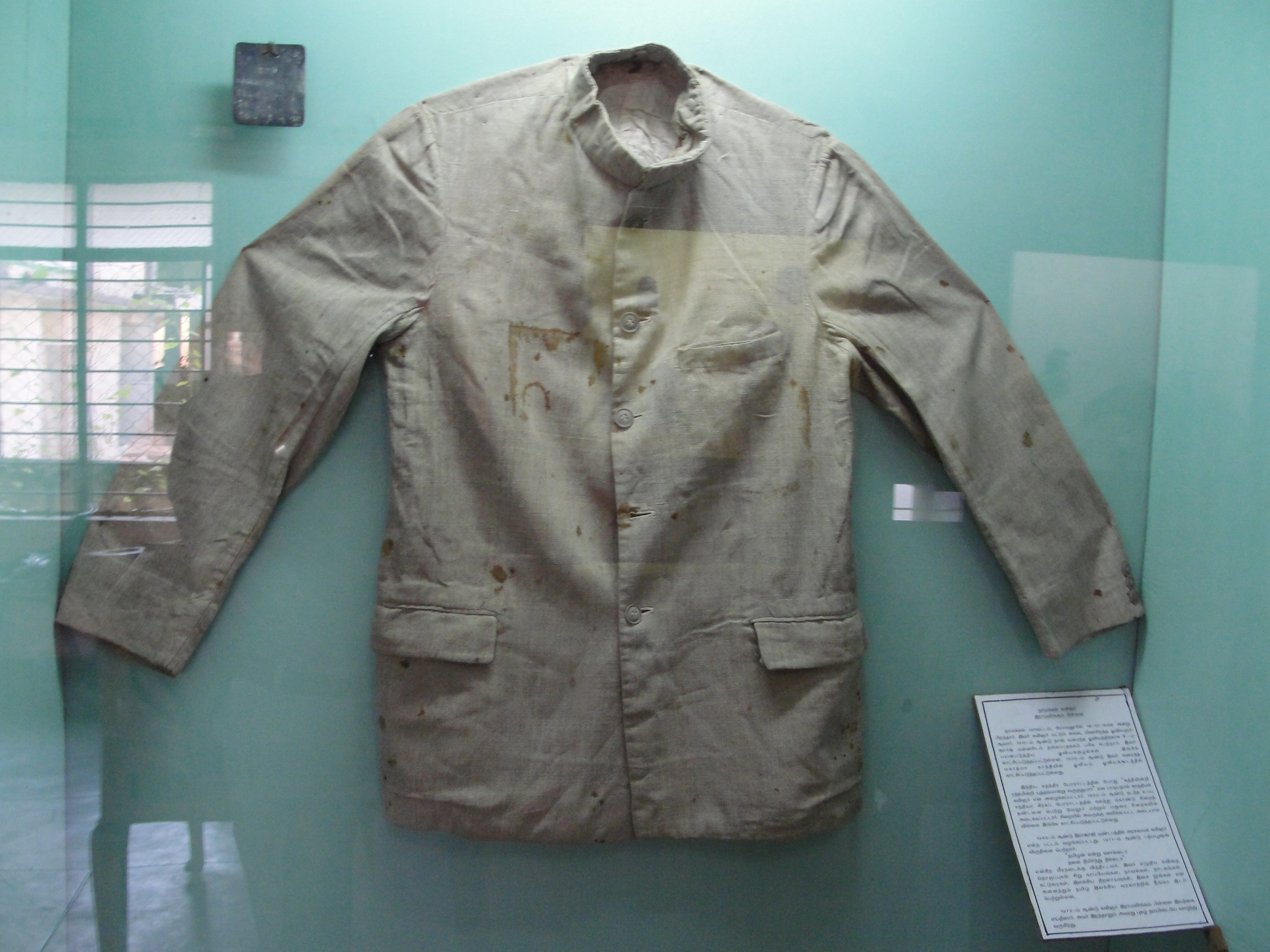
Belongings of Namakkal V Ramalingam

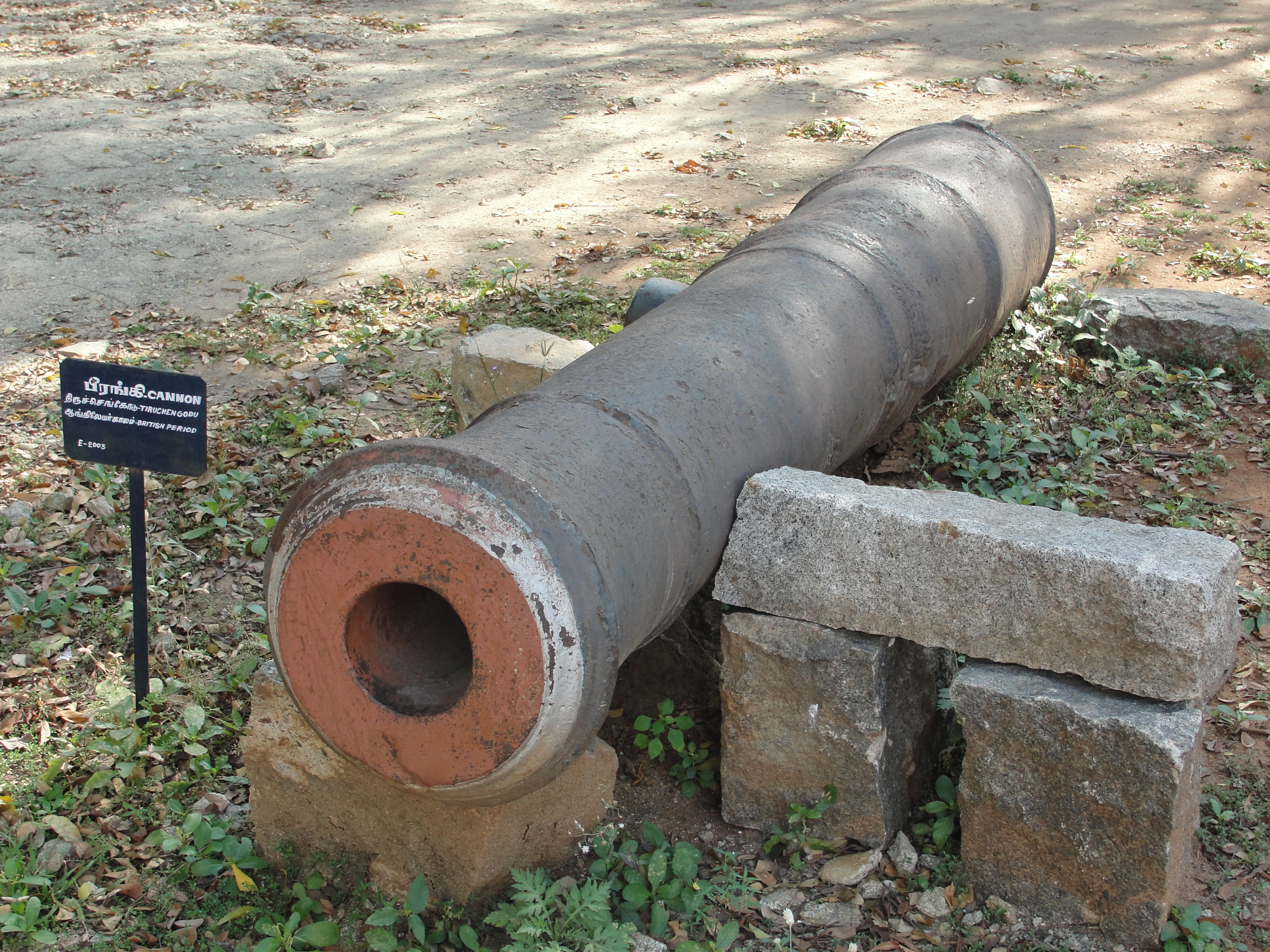
British Period Cannon

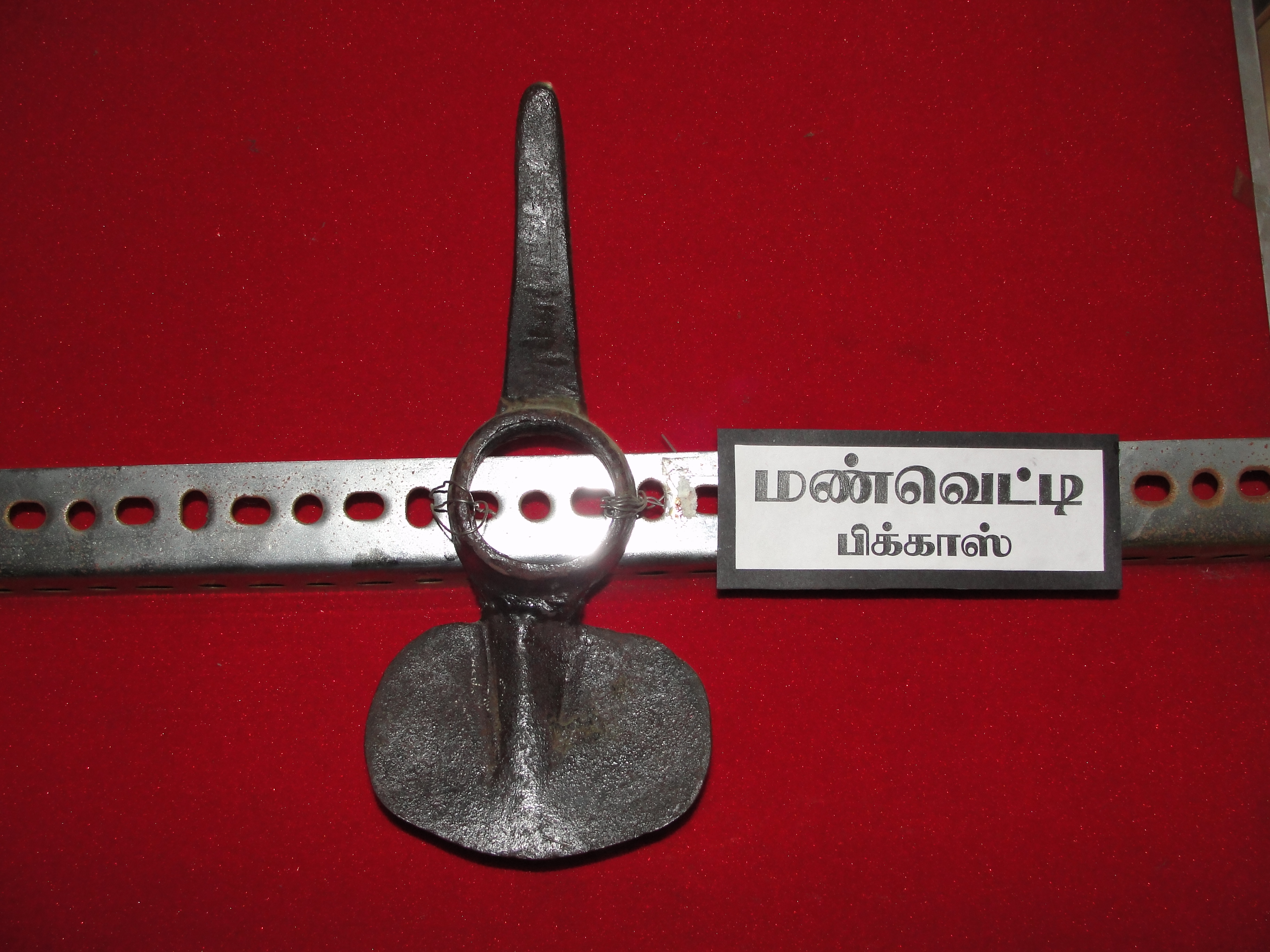
closeup of hoe

== See also ==
- Government Museum, Chennai
- Government Museum, Tiruchirappalli
- Tamil Nadu Police Museum
- List of Tamil Nadu Government Estates, Complexes, Buildings and Structures
