= Molasi =

Village in Tamil Nadu, India

Coordinates: 11°15′N 77°51′E

- Interactive map of Molasi

Molasi is a village situated 16 km south of Tiruchengode in the Indian state of Tamil Nadu. It lies on the bank of the river Cauvery, which flows from Coorg hills.

== Geography ==
Molasi is near to Jedarpalayam, and Patlur. The village of Solasiramani is to the east, Eryamangalam to the west and Piruthi to the north. The road from Velur to Kumarapalayam passes through this village.

Molasi is located in a rural area. The main occupation of people in Molasi is agriculture, but there is also some tourism.

== Infrastructure ==
Molasi has a government school and a government hospital. The pincode is 637210.

Molasi has good roads and electricity. It can be accessed by bus or rail.

There is a church, a temple, and a mosque in the village.
