= Solasiramani =

- village
- Country: India
- State: Tamil Nadu
- District: Namakkal

Languages
  - Official: Tamil
- Time zone: UTC+5:30 (IST)
- Postal code: 637210

Solasiramani is a village located in Namakkal district, Tamil Nadu, India. It is situated 30km away from sub-district headquarter Paramathi Velur (tehsildar office) and 40km away from district headquarter, Namakkal. As per 2009 stats, Solasiramani village is also a gram panchayat.The village spans a total geographical area of 704.48 hectares.

The village is located on the banks of river Kaveri and agriculture and allied activities are the professions of the people here. The village has not suffered any drought as it is located on the riverbanks. Bore well and tank irrigation supplement the agriculture in summer and dry seasons. Sugarcane, Turmeric, Coconut and Rice are the major cultivation in this village. The major government banks located in this village are Primary Agricultural Credit Co-operative Society,and Tamilnadu Grama Bank. A Veterinary Dispensary of the Tamil Nadu Government is also there to cater the livestock of farmers. There is one government elementary and one government higher secondary schools are located in this village.

There is a barrage on the river Kaveri which generates Hydel power during water flow in the river which is one among three barrages of Bhavani Kattalai Hydroelectric Project which has a production capacity of 30MW with two turbines each of 15MW capacity.

This village has a post office facilitated with post payment bank and Postal PIN Code of the village is 637210. The bus transport facilities link this village to Tiruchengode, Salem, Erode, Pallipalayam and Karur. The nearby railway station is Pasur, Erode and airport is Salem Airport.

== Temples ==
=== Angalaparameswari Amman ===
A 500 year old temple.
