= Patlur =

Patlur Patalur
- Village Panchayat
- Location in Tamil Nadu, India Patlur (India)
- Coordinates: 11.6°N 77.6°E
- Country: India
- State: Tamil Nadu
- District: Erode

Population
  - Total: 8,100

Languages
  - Official: Tamil
- Time zone: UTC+5:30 (IST)
- PIN: 638314
- Vehicle registration: TN33, TN36
- Nearest city: Anthiyur; Bhavani
- Sex ratio: 1000(M):936(F) ♂/♀
- Literacy: 72%
- Lok Sabha constituency: Tirupur
- Vidhan Sabha constituency: Bhavani
- Climate: Tropical (Köppen)
- Website: patlur.blogspot.com
- Village code 16, block code 12 (Ammapet), district code 10.

Patlur is a village in Anthiyur Taluk, Erode district, Tamil Nadu State, India with a population of approximately 8100. The main occupation in Patlur is agriculture.

== Location ==
Patlur is located in the central part of south India at the junction of four roads namely Bhavani road, Anthiyur road, Mettur road and Velli Tiruppur road. The nearest service centre is Anthiyur town, approximately 6 km to the west on the state highway 175. Patlur lies on the Tamil Nadu plateau with the Nilgiris mountain range rising in the west.

=== Water sources ===
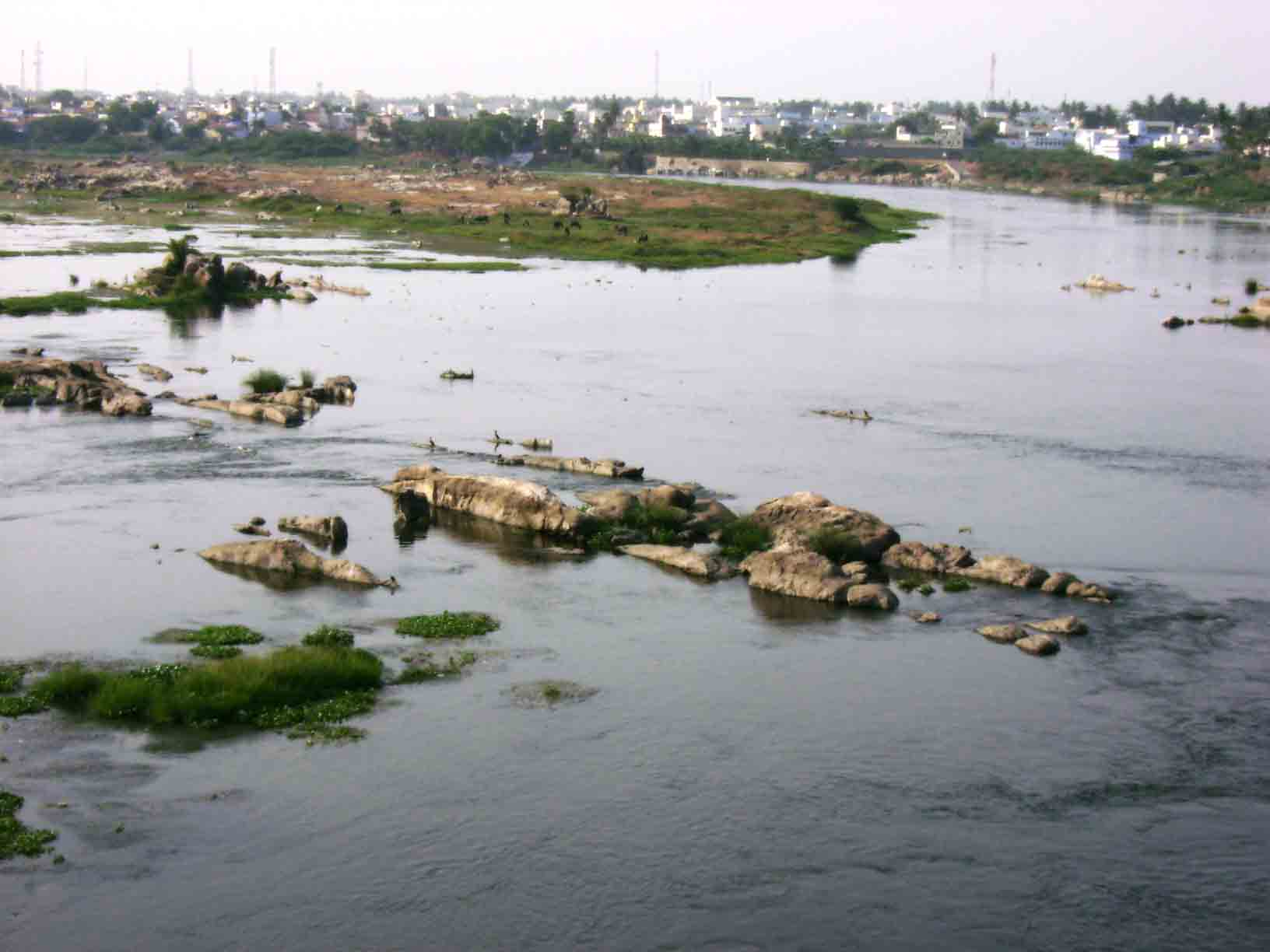
Cauvery at Erode township.

Patlur's main water source is the Cauvery river, approximately 8 km to the east. It is supplemented by dams and lakes such as Patlur lake and Check dam.

== Governance ==
Until 2006, Patlur was governed by the council of the Anthiyur constituency. From 2011, it fell under the control of the council of the Bhavani assembly constituency (104). The parliamentary constituency is number 18, Tirupur . Patlur has a number of polling wards, numbered 1 to 14. They include: Kemmiyampatti, Poosariyur, Makkallur, Kalipatti, Karattur, Nallroad, Kattu Kottaigal, Maravankuttai, Kattukottaigal, Sokkanathamalaiyur, Poiyankuttai, Bommanpatty, Annanagar, Bommanpatti Pudhuvalavu, Muthugoundenpudur, Mosugoundanur, and Vengakallur (part of Poosariyur).

== Industry ==
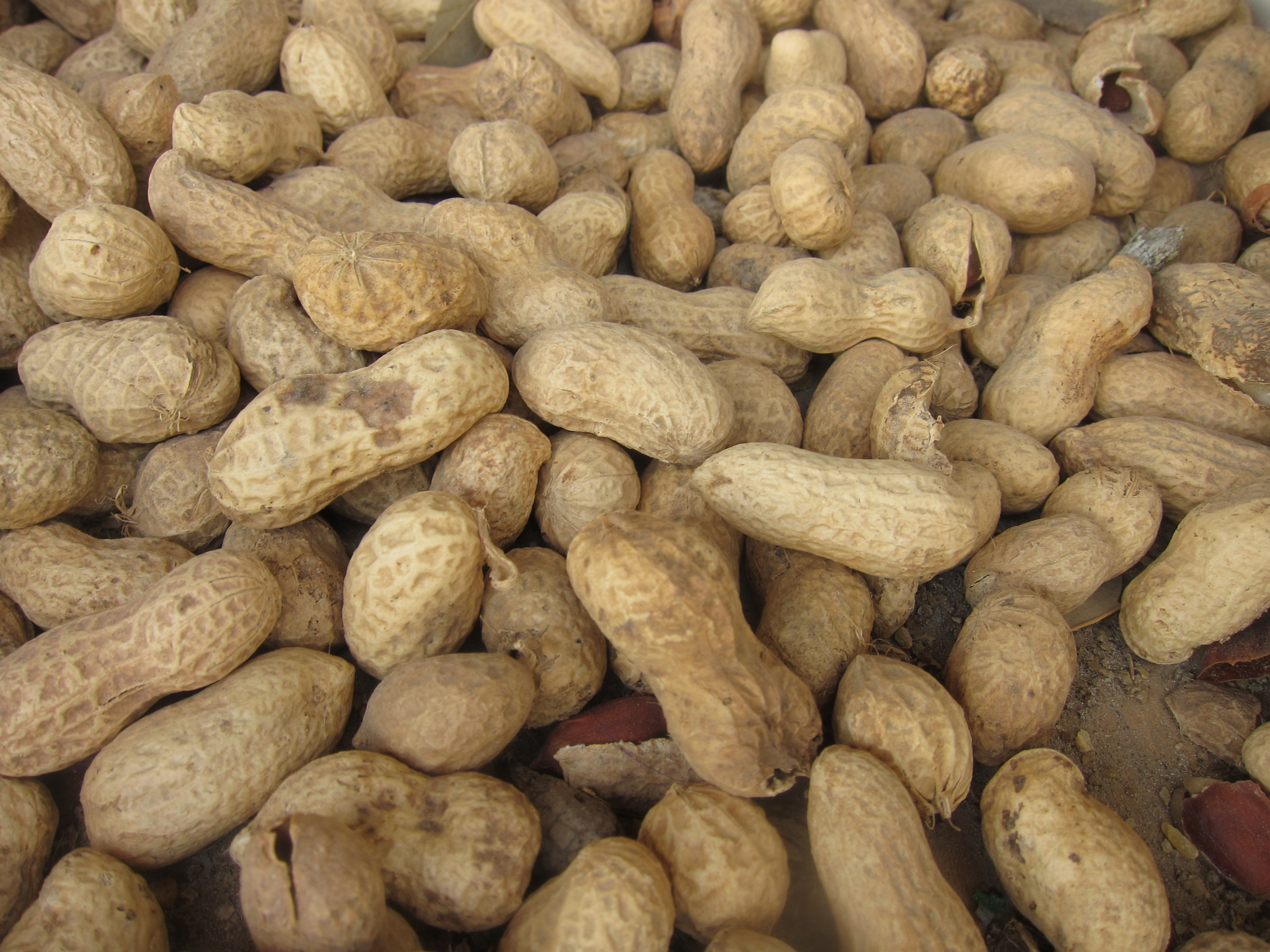
Peanuts.

Patlur residents are employed in primary and secondary industries, particularly the growing and processing of groundnuts (peanuts) into oil in mills.

== Kariyakali Amman festival ==
The annual Kariyakali Amman festival is celebrated for fifteen days in the Aani Tamil month at the temple in the northern part of the village. It starts on a Wednesday with poochatu, the poo midhithal (fire walking) before the mother goddess Kariyakali. Abishekam (a religious bathing ceremony) and pooja (offerings and remembrances to the dead) are also performed. The festival ends with the manjal neerattu, the turmeric dousing ceremony. The festival is also a showcase for amateur arts performances and ceremonial activities.

== Muthumari Amman festival ==
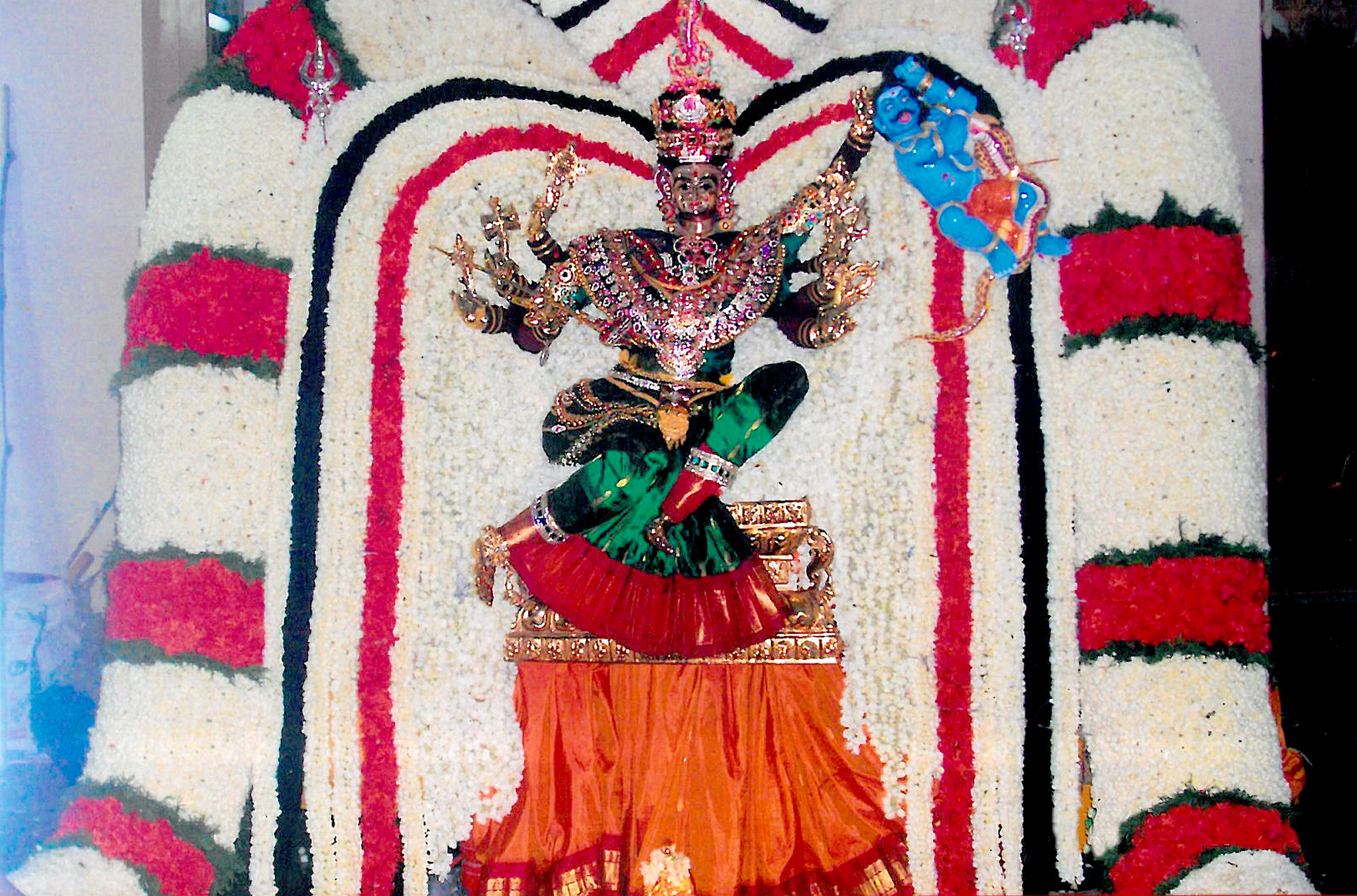
Muthumari Amman

The annual Muthumari Amman festival is celebrated for fifteen days at the temple at Nathagattu Thottam in the western part of Patlur. It begins on the first Wednesday in the Tamil month of Panguni with the Poochatu. Holy water is later brought from Cauvery river to the temple and offered to the goddess Muthumari. It ends with abishekam, pooja and pongal (a special rice dish) being offered to the mother goddess. In the mavalukku procession, the people carry raw rice flour paste and flowers on a plate on their heads. In the evening, there are traditional dances and programs of entertainments.

== Karumalai andavar panguni uthiram festival ==
The annual Karamulai andavar Panguni Uthiram festival takes place at the temple in the centre of Patlur. It takes place over two days about panguni uthiram day. Holy water from the Cauvery river is brought and offered to god Rakkiannasamy Murugan (also known as Karumalaiandavar). Abishekam and pooja take place and annadhanam (food donated for penance) is offered to the devotees in the evening. On the second day, manjal neeratu and procession takes place with fire works (vanavedikkai), a kathik aluvu dhal ceremony and thalattu.

== Semmuneeswarar festival ==
The Semmuneeswarar (also called Semmunichamy) temple is located 5 kilometres (3.1 mi) from Patlur at Poosariyur. Its festival is an annual event of thirty day's duration which starts on the first Friday of the Tamil month of Chithirai.

On the fifteenth day of the festival, Mudhal Poojai (the first pooja) is celebrated with the kavukutti (sacrifice of a goat). Worshipers standing in a queue praise the god Semmunichamy and the goddess Eswari, the god Mannatheeswarar, the saints Vamuni, Poomuni and Vedamuni. The mudi kannikkai (hair offering ceremony) is also performed.

On the thirtieth day, the Maru Poojai (the second pooja) is celebrated. A mattu santhai (a special cattle market) takes place over three days and on the thirty-third day, the therottam (car festival) is celebrated. The car of the deity travels from the temple to Poosariyur Madappalliiyarai. Local buses assist the travels of devotees. Approximately 50,000 people attend the festival. people with mental illnesses attend the temple so that the priests may strike their heads with neem leaves to ward off evil spirits.

== Pradosham Vazhipadu ==
The Vakeeswarar, a Shiva temple, is located on the Velli Thiruppur main road. On the thirteenth day (Trayodashi) of each lunar fortnight (Pakshafortnight, Pradosha is celebrated with fasting and a special pooja offered to Nandheeswarar (Shiva as the bull).

== Other Notable events ==
- Palani Andavar festival is celebrated annually on Poosam day in the Tamil month of Thai.
- Vinayaga Sadhurthi day is celebrated annually at the Lakshmi Vinayagar and Selva Vinayagar temples.
- Vaigunda Ekadasi is celebrated annually at the Sentraya Perumal temple with fasting and Narayanan car procession in the evening.
- On Fridays and Saturdays in the Tamil month of Purattasi, a large group of people climb Palamalai hill in order to worship the god Sidheswara.
- Bharathinagar Sri Maha Kali amman festival is celebrated annually in Masi month with a program of entertainments.
- Therkutheru Sri Mari amman and Sri Pattla amman festival is celebrated annually with special abishekam and poojas.
- Kaval theivam (a frontier deity) is honoured with Sri Padamuniappan, Sri Muthuminiappan and Sri Karuppusamy with a grand pooja.

== Education ==
Panchayat union schools in the Patlur village area include: Patlur primary school, Patlur middle school, Kaalippatty primary school, C. K. Malaiyur primary school, Kemmiampatty primary school, Poosariyur primary school and Maravankuttai upper primary school.

== Temples ==
- Muthumariamman
- Vakeeswarar
- Sentraya Perumaal
- Kariyakaliamman
- Karumalai Aandavar
- Bathrakali amman Temple(6 km away)
- Semmuneeswarar (5 km away)
- Sokkanatha Malai (Shiva temple, 2 km away)
- Bhavani Kooduthurai (20 km away)

== Dams ==
Nearby dams are the Mettur (33 km away), Varattupallam (16 km away) and the Bhavani Sagar (62 km away).

== Notable places ==
- Oorachi Kottai Malai hills (20 km)
- Malai Karuppu Sami Kovil (shrine to the Tamil god, 15 km away)
- Palamalai hills (15 km)
