= Samayasangili =

Coordinates: 11°22′16″N 77°47′20″E

- Village
- Interactive map of Samayasangili
- Country: India
- State: Tamil Nadu
- District: Namakkal

Population (2001)
  - Total: 4,323

Languages
  - Official: Tamil
- Time zone: UTC+5:30 (IST)
- Postal code: 638008

Samayasangili is a village in Namakkal district in the Indian state of Tamil Nadu. It consists of five sub villages includes Samayasangilli, Thottipalayam Pudur, Thottipalayam Palaiyur, Sengutaipalayam, Seerampalayam.

== Geography ==
The Village located at the Bank of river cauvery and it is the border of Namakkal district.

== Demographics ==
=== Population ===
As of 2001 census, Samayasangili had a population of 4323.

== Economy ==
The main occupation in the village is agriculture. The cultivation generally depends on monsoon rains, wells and tanks. Nearly 90 percent of the cultivated area is under food crops. The principal cereal crops of this district are paddy, cholam. Among pulses, the major crops are redgram, blackgram, greengram and horsegram. Of the commercial crops, sugarcane, Turmeric and tapioca are some of the important crops.

Bhavani Kattalai Barrage I Hydel Power Project is in this village generating electricity under TNEB.

== Transport ==
=== By Road ===
Samayasangilli is connected by roads to nearer city Erode and town Pallipalayam and komarapalayam. It is 8 km from Erode and Pallipalayam and 10 km from komarapalayam.

== Education ==
Elementary School Samayasangilli, and Sengutaipalayam
