= Double Decker City Bus Terminus, Salem =

Salem Town Bus Station Old Bus Stand, Salem

General information
- Location: V Market Rd, First Agraharam, Salem, Salem District, Tamil Nadu. PIN – 636001. India
- Coordinates: 11.6528°N 78.1591°E
- Owner: Salem City Municipal Corporation
- Operator: Department of Transport (Tamil Nadu)
- Platforms: Ground floor 3 platform space for ( 90 buses ) First floor 3 platform space for (90 buses) Total - 6 platforms 180 buses

Construction
- Parking: Yes
- Cycle facilities: Yes
- Accessible: Disabled access

Other information
- Station code: SLM (TNSTC)
- Fare zone: TNSTC Salem Division SLM/394

Passengers
- 1,75,000 passengers per day
Location

Town Bus Terminus Salem popularly known as Old Bus Stand, Salem, is the main Town bus terminus of Salem City in the Indian state of Tamil Nadu.

The terminal spreads over 3.8 acres (1.5 ha). It is managed by Department of Transport. It operates about 1,500 buses.

The terminus is about 4.1 kilometres (2.5 mi) away from Salem Junction railway station.

== History ==
Under the Central Government's Smart Cities Mission, the Salem Municipal Corporation began demolishing the terminus to build a new two-tiered bus station at a cost of ₹92.13 crores in 2019.

== See also ==
- Central Bus Terminus Salem
- Transport in Tamil Nadu
- Salem Junction
- Tamil Nadu State Transport Corporation
- State Express Transport Corporation (Tamil Nadu)
