= Pasur, Erode =

Pasur
- Panchayat town
- Location in Tamil Nadu, India
- Coordinates: 11°14′10″N 77°51′27″E
- Country: India
- State: Tamil Nadu
- District: Erode

Area
  - Total: 6.17 km^{2} (2.38 sq mi)

Population (2011)
  - Total: 3,670
  - Density: 595/km^{2} (1,540/sq mi)

Languages
  - Official: Tamil
- Time zone: UTC+5:30 (IST)

Pasur is a panchayat town in Erode taluk of Erode district in the Indian state of Tamil Nadu. It is located in the north-western part of the state. Spread across an area of 6.17 km^{2} (2.38 sq mi), it had a population of 3,670 individuals as per the 2011 census. The panchayat is served by the Pasur railway station of Southern Railway zone.

== Geography and administration ==
Pasur is located in Erode taluk, Erode division of Erode district in the Indian state of Tamil Nadu. Spread across an area of 6.17 km^{2} (2.38 sq mi), it is one of the 42 panchayat towns in the district. It is located in the north-western part of the state. Pasur railway station serves the town panchayat, and comes under the Salem railway division of the Southern Railway zone.

The town panchayat is headed by a chairperson, who is elected by the members, who are chosen through direct elections. The town forms part of the Modakkurichi Assembly constituency that elects its member to the Tamil Nadu legislative assembly and the Erode Lok Sabha constituency that elects its member to the Parliament of India.

== Demographics ==
As per the 2011 census, Pasur had a population of 3,670 individuals across 1,120 households. The population saw a marginal decrease compared to the previous census in 2001 when 3,870 inhabitants were registered. The population consisted of 1,796 males and 1,874 females. About 285 individuals were below the age of six years. The entire population is classified as urban. The town has an average literacy rate of 70.5%. About 26.6% of the population belonged to scheduled castes.

About 60.2% of the eligible population were employed. Hinduism was the majority religion which was followed by 99.5% of the population, with Christianity (0.4%) and Islam (0.1%) being minor religions.
