= Pasur railway station =

Railway station in Tamil Nadu, India

Pasur

General information
- Location: Pasur Railway Station, Solangapalayam-Pasur-Solasiramani Road, Pasur, Erode, Tamil Nadu, India
- Coordinates: 11.2409°N 77.8550°E
- Elevation: 153 metres (502 ft)
- System: Indian Railways station
- Owner: Indian Railways
- Line: Erode–Tiruchirappalli line
- Platforms: 2
- Tracks: 2

Construction
- Structure type: On ground

Other information
- Station code: PAS
- Zone(s): Southern Railway zone
- Division(s): Salem
- Fare zone: Southern Railway zone

History
- Electrified: Single electric line
Location

Pasur railway station (station code: PAS) is an NSG–6 category Indian railway station in Salem railway division of Southern Railway zone. It is a station near Erode in Tamil Nadu, India. It is located along the Erode–Tiruchirappalli line between Erode Junction and Karur Junction.
