= Government Museum, Tiruchirappalli =

- அரசு அருங்காட்சியகம், திருச்சிராப்பள்ளி
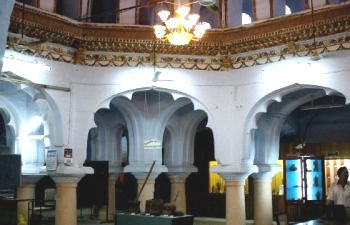
- Interiors of Rani Mangammal Darbar Hall
- Established: 1983; 43 years ago
- Location: Rani Mangammal Darbar Hall (Near Town Hall Complex), Singarathope, Tiruchirappalli, Tamil Nadu. PIN - 620 002
- Coordinates: 10.8250°N 78.6958°E
- Type: Heritage centre
- Accreditation: Ministry of Culture (India)
- Collections: Stone Age
- Collection size: 2000
- Directors: Principal Secretary & Commissioner of Museums
- Owner: Government of Tamil Nadu
- Public transit access: Chatram Bus Station; Tiruchirappalli Fort; Tiruchirappalli Town
- Parking: On site

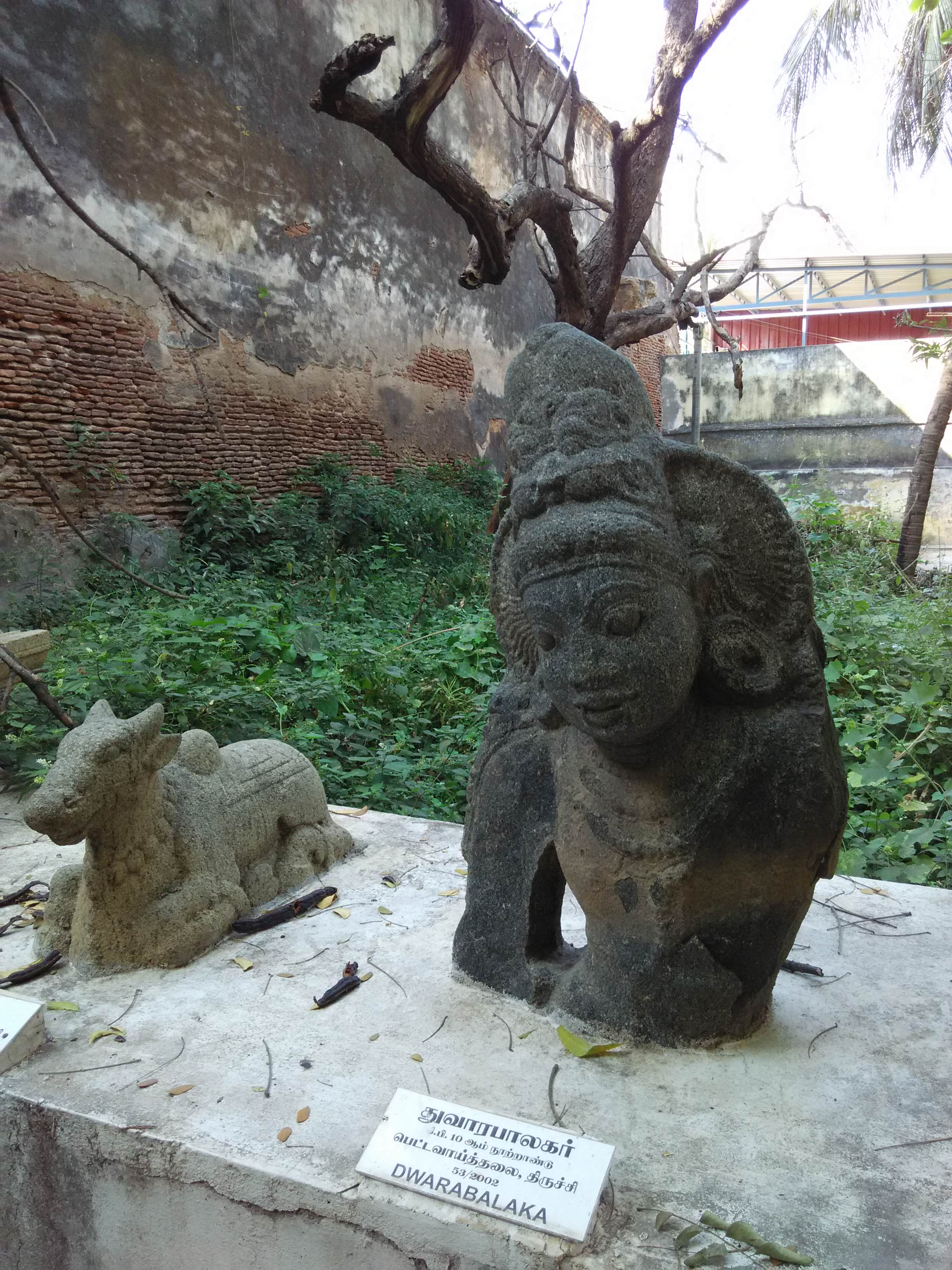
A sculpture of dwarapalaka made in chola era.

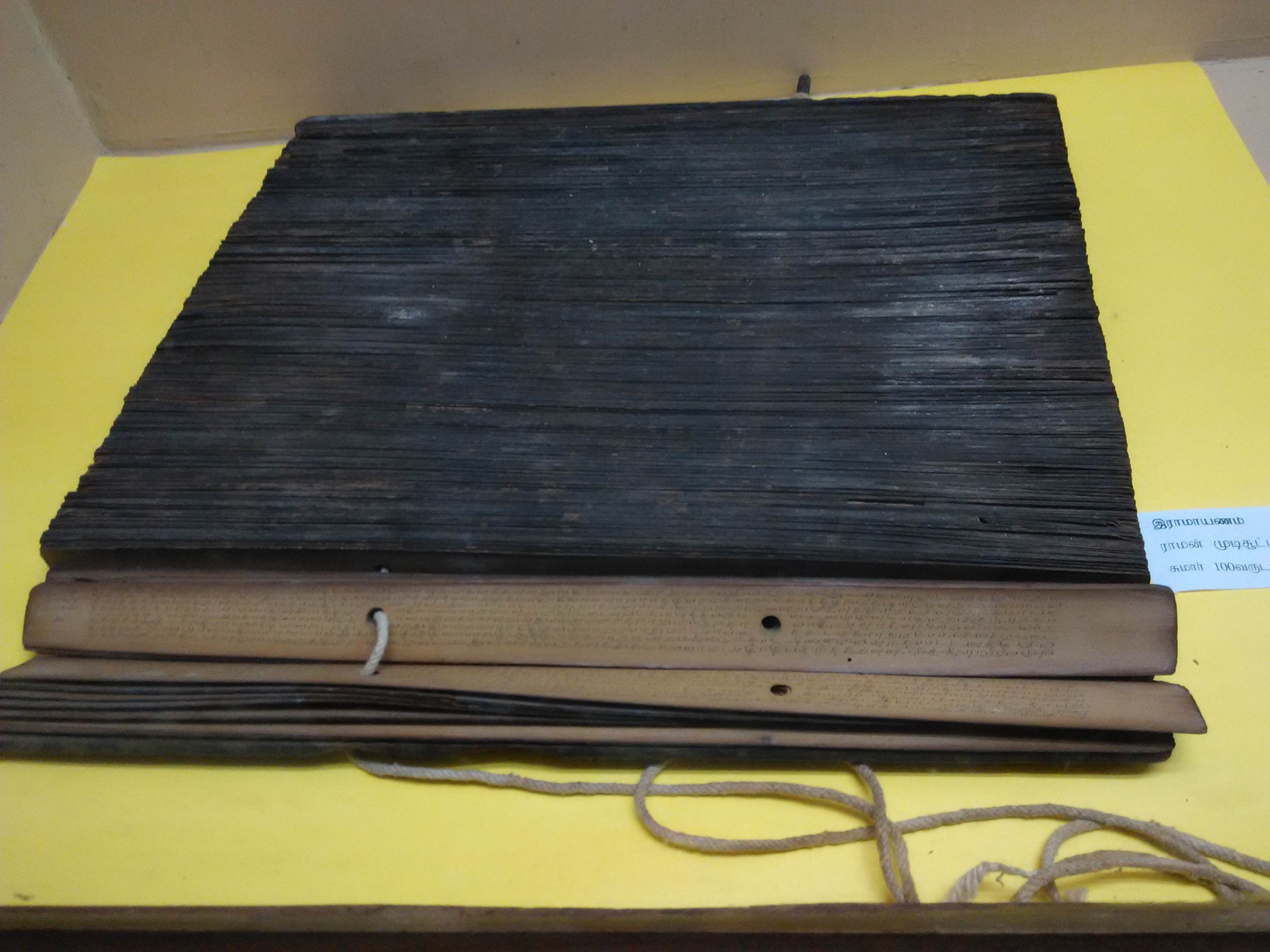
Manuscript means 'script written by hand'.(manu means hand)Earlier Indian civilization used this technology to transfer knowledge and rules from generation to generation.

The Government Museum, Tiruchirappalli is a heritage centre at Tiruchirappalli, Tamil Nadu.It is situated at Rani Mangammal Mahal in Bharathidasan town, near the super bazaar. The nearest landmark is Rockfort temple.

Rani Mangamma Mahal was built by Chokkanatha Nayak, the then ruler of Madurai. It was also known as the Durbar Hall of the Madurai Nayaks when Tiruchirappalli was their capital, from 1616 to 1634 and later from 1665 to 1731.

The museum contains an array of exhibits relating to geology, zoology, paintings, anthropology, epigraphy and history.

== Background ==
This museum was established in 1983 by the State Department of Museums at Cantonment after Salem and Madurai, as a principle of the government of Tamil Nadu to have a museum in every district. It was later moved to Rani Mangammal Darbar Hall (a Monument built during Nayak rule, also known as Kolu Mandapam) during 1997, which is within the Town Hall Complex. The museum is maintained by the Public Works Department.

== Exhibits ==
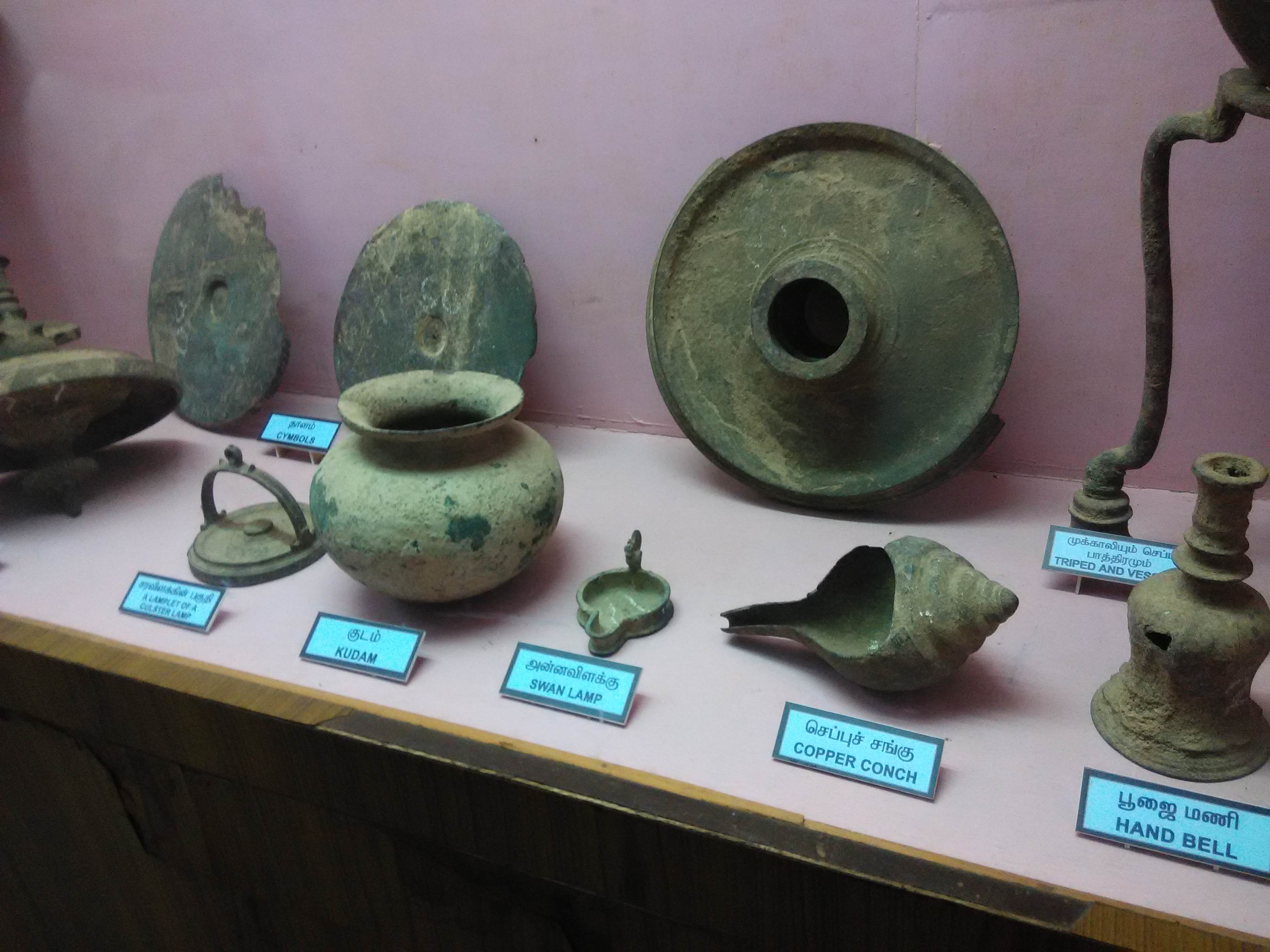
Pottery of Tamil civilization

The museum has both indoor and outdoor exhibits of up to 2000 objects. Some of the indoor exhibits include epoch artefacts like megalithic sculptures, carvings, Stone Age inscriptions, musical instruments, tools, currencies and Chola-era coins, paintings, photographs, rare documents, palm-leaf manuscripts, fossils, tribal life of pachamalai and kohli hills, weapons and cannonballs used by Hyder Ali, early day snaps from BHEL company, Srirangam temple model, Rockfort temple model and philatelic materials.

The stone idols in the sculpture park forms the outdoor exhibits. The park opened on 17 Apr 2012 has about 45 Hindu sculptures of gods and goddesses dating 13th century to 18th century including sacrificial altar, stone nandis and lingams.

The museum also has an ecology section which houses a collection of rare insects, birds and mammals.

A rare sculpture from Tanjavur paintings displaying Lord Thirumal as crawling Krishna is on the display. The display of Goddess Durga, Saint Manickavasagar, Chandra Sekhare and Lord Nataraj can also be seen.

== Timing ==
It is open throughout the year (Morning 10.00 a.m. to Evening 5.00 p.m. except every Friday).
