= Bharat Ratna Dr. M.G.R. Central Bus Stand =

Bharat Ratna Dr. M.G.R. Central Bus Stand Salem Central Bus Stand
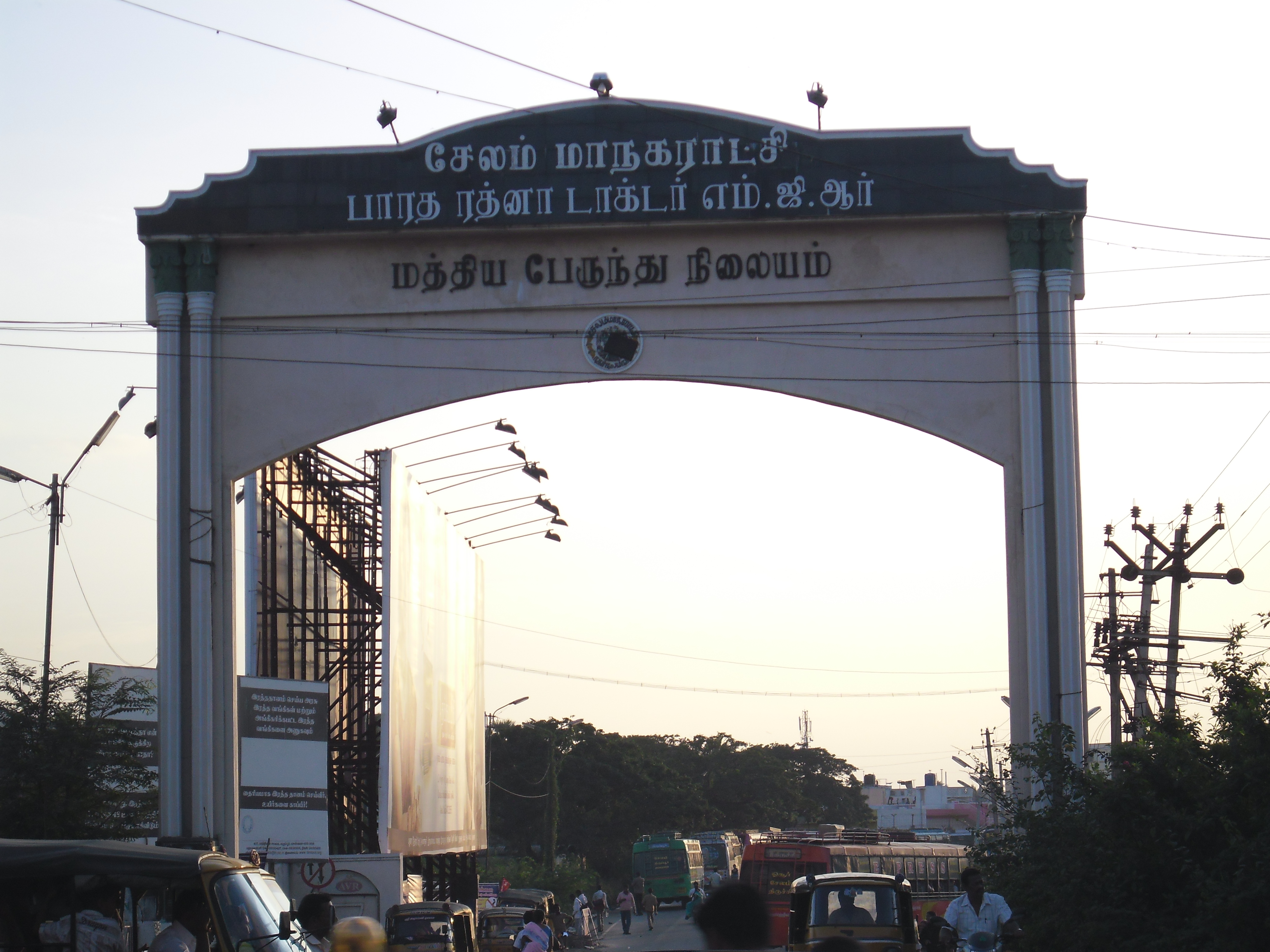
- Front view of Bharat Ratna Dr. M.G.R. Central Bus Stand

General information
- Location: Omalur Main Rd, Salem-636004,Tamil Nadu. India
- Coordinates: 11.6673°N 78.1424°E
- Owner: Salem City Municipal Corporation
- Operator: Department of Transport
- Platforms: 4 (80 Bays) 4th Largest Bus Stand in Tamilnadu

Construction
- Structure type: On ground
- Parking: Yes
- Cycle facilities: Yes
- Accessible: Disabled access

Other information
- Station code: SLM(SETC, KSRTC & KSRTC)
- Fare zone: TNSTC Salem Division

History
- Former names: Salem Central Bus Stand

Passengers
- 3,00,000 per day
Location

Bharat Ratna Dr. M.G.R. Central Bus Stand, commonly known as Salem Central Bus Stand, is one of the bus terminus of Salem other being the Town Bus Terminus Salem City.

== Overview ==
Being a major transit point in the central region of the state and spreading over an area of 5.9 acres (2.4 ha) this terminus is managed by Department of Transport (Tamil Nadu), experiences a heavy traffic of operating about 1,100 buses operating and crossing through the bus terminus. It is located in Center of the Salem City. It has been renamed by Government of Tamil Nadu as Bharat Ratna Dr. M.G.R. Central Bus Stand to honor the AIADMK founder and the former Chief Minister of Tamil Nadu M. G. Ramachandran. This project was built on contract basis done by Sri chakra construction.

== Renovation ==
The Salem Municipal Corporation had decided to Lay concrete flooring on the entire new bus stand premises at an outlay of Rs. 5 crores. This would enable in keeping the bus stand neat and tidy and also prevent waterlogging during the monsoon period. The project has been undertaken under the Infrastructure Gap Filling Fund.

== Routes ==
Platforms	To
1	All SETC, Dharmapuri, Hosur, Bengaluru, Krishnagiri, Mettur, Yercaud, Mecheri, Pennagaram
2	Chennai, Tirupati, Tiruvannamalai, Vellore, Cuddalore, Villupuram, Attur, Tirupathur, Kallakurichi, Pondicherry, Chidambaram, Perambalur, Ariyalur, Kanchipuram, Nellore, Chengalpattu
3	Kochi, Trivandrum, Thoothukudi, Trichy, Madurai, Karur, Namakkal, Rasipuram, Thanjavur, Kumbakonam, Nagapattinam, Tiruvarur, Sivagangai, Tirunelveli, Sivakasi, Theni, Dindigul, Pudukottai, Rameshwaram, Tiruchendur
4	Coimbatore, Edappadi, Erode, Tirupur, Ooty, Pollachi, Palani, Sathyamangalam, Thrissur, Kozhikode, Guruvayur, Kollam, Perundurai, Palakkad, Ernakulam, Bhavani, Poolampatti
Intercity Service	Junction, Airport, Old Bus Stand, Suramangalam, Omalur, Elampillai, Siddhar Kovil, Kondalampatti, Ayothiyapatnam, Karuppur, Veerapandi, All around Salem City.

== Connections ==
The terminus is about 3 kilometres (1.9 mi) away from Salem Junction railway station and it is 19 km away from Salem Airport.

== Controversies ==
Recent reports about the bus stand suggest some area are a hotspot for drugs as it lacks proper security. It is also stated that young women are being exploited or involved in illegal activities in some locations of the bus stand.

== See also ==
- Town Bus Terminus Salem
- Salem Junction
- Salem City Municipal Corporation
- Edappadi
- Yercaud
