= Salem Airport (India) =

Airport in Salem, India

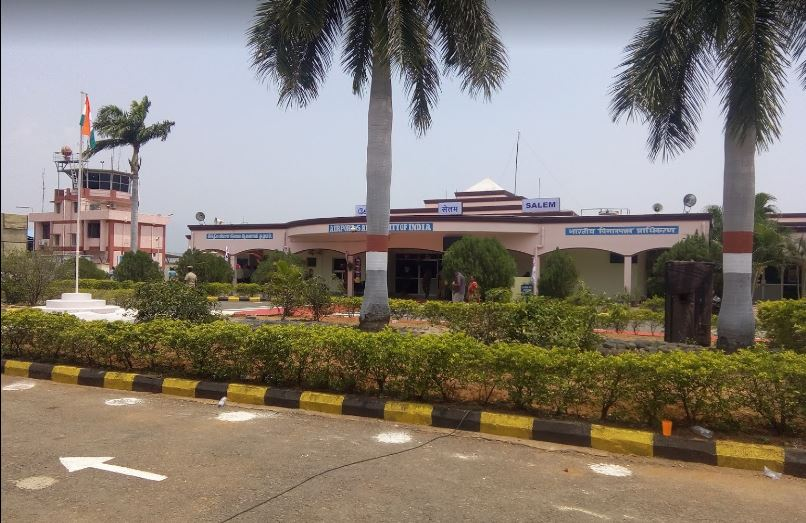
- IATA: SXV; ICAO: VOSM

Summary
- Airport type: Public
- Owner: Ministry of Civil Aviation
- Operator: Airports Authority of India
- Serves: Salem Metropolitan Area
- Location: Kamalapuram, Salem district, Tamil Nadu, India
- Opened: April 1993; 33 years ago
- Elevation AMSL: 307 m (1,007 ft)
- Coordinates: 11°46′55″N 078°03′52″E
- Website: Salem Airport

Map
- Location in Salem SXV (Tamil Nadu) SXV (India)

Runways
Direction	Length		Surface
Direction	m	ft	Surface
04/22	1,806	6,000	Asphalt

Statistics (April 2025 - March 2026)
- Passengers: 1,27,070 (▼ -2.4%)
- Aircraft movements: 2,584 (▲3.2%)
- Cargo tonnage: 0 ( 0%)
- Source: AAI

Salem Airport (IATA: SXV, ICAO: VOSM) is a domestic airport serving the city of Salem in the Indian state of Tamil Nadu. It is located at Kamalapuram, about 20 km (12 mi) from the city centre.

== History ==
Salem airport is located at Kamalapuram, about 20 km (12 mi) from the city. It was built at a cost of ₹60 million (US$620,000), and opened in April 1993. The airport was partially funded through private donations, with the Salem Steel Plant contributing ₹3 million (US$31,000). Originally, the airport had a single 1,350 m (4,430 ft)-long runway, and it was planned for Vayudoot to begin flight services, using small aircraft. However, the runway was later expanded to accommodate larger aircraft. Initially, a single service was launched to Chennai via Coimbatore, and was withdrawn after three months due to poor patronage. The airport was in disuse since then.

In the early 2000s, the Airports Authority of India spruced up the airport to enable it to handle commercial operations again. While Simplifly Deccan obtained permission to fly to the airport in 2003, it did not materialise. In 2006, the airline agreed to begin its Salem operations, but only if the local industry deposited at least ₹9 million (US$93,000) or gave a commitment for 50% bookings on average. After the airline merged with Kingfisher Airlines, the service to Chennai was finally launched in November 2009. The service was withdrawn on 28 October 2011 after the airline faced financial issues.

In 2018, the airport was one of the destinations identified under the Government of India's UDAN regional connectivity scheme. In March 2018, the Ministry of Civil Aviation changed the status of the airport to "unserved" to enable the introduction of flights under the scheme. In the same month, TruJet announced the launch of flights to Chennai, with other airlines such as Air Odisha planning to begin operations in 2019. TruJet suspended operations when it filed for bankruptcy in June 2022. Since then, the airport remained closed for commercial operations, until Alliance Air and IndiGo launched flights from the airport in October 2023.

== Infrastructure ==
The airport is spread across a 136 acres (55 ha) site. It has a single 1,806 m (5,925 ft)-long runway, oriented 04/22, and equipped with navigational facilities including Very high frequency radio, Precision Approach Path Indicator, and Non-directional beacon. The parking apron can accommodate two small fixed wing and one narrow body aircraft. The terminal building can handle 100 passengers simultaneously.

In the 2010s, the union government allocated funds for the expansion of the airport. However, protests by farmers and land owners, delayed the land acquisition process.

== Airlines and destinations ==
Airlines	Destinations
Alliance Air	Bengaluru, Kochi
IndiGo	Bengaluru, Chennai, Hyderabad

== Connectivity ==
The airport is connected by government operated buses from the Central Bus Terminus in Salem. Salem Junction is the nearest major railhead. Cab services, call taxis and auto rickshaws provide commuting services to the airport.

== See also ==
- List of airports in Tamil Nadu
