= Rayanallur Village =

Rayanallur
- Panchayat
- Location in Tamil Nadu, India Rayanallur (India)
- Coordinates: 11.336581°N 79.5556°E
- Country: India
- State: Tamil Nadu
- District: Cuddalore

Population (2001)
  - Total: 3,600

Languages
  - Official: Tamil
- Time zone: UTC+5:30 (IST)
- PIN: 608303
- Telephone code: 04144

Rayanallur Village is situated on the banks of the Veeranam Lake in North Chidambaram town, Cuddalore District in the state of Tamil Nadu.

== Demographics ==
The village primary is agrarian based economy with most of the workforce engaged in tilling of ancestral land. The primary crop is Paddy and green gram done in seasonal rotation. The village is also known for her betel leaf production.

According to 2011 census, the population of the Rayanallur Village is about 3600. with Male 1,721 Females 1879. A total of 451 were under the age of six, constituting 233 males and 218 females.

The average literacy of the Village was 67.66%, The village has a total of 784 households. There were a total of 1443 workers, which comprising cultivators, main agricultural laborers, household industries, marginal workers, marginal cultivators, marginal agricultural laborers, marginal workers in household industries other marginal workers. And other workers.

== Main streets in Rayanallur ==
1. Kilakku Theru (East Street)
2. Vadukku Theru (North Street)
3. Therkku Theru (South Street)
4. MGR Street
5. Yathaver Street

== Temples in Village ==
1. Lord Shri Shiva Temple
2. Lord Shri Ganesh Temple
3. Sri Throwpathi Amman Temple
4. Sri Aiyanar Temple

== Schools in Rayanallur ==
Government-Aided Primary School

== See also ==
- Lalpet
- Kattumannarkoil
- Kattumannarkoil#Veeranam Lake and water resources
- Cuddalore
- Chidambaram
- Sethiyathope
