= Tanur, Cuddalore =

Village in Tamil Nadu, India

Tanur
- Village
- Location within Tamil Nadu Location within India
- Coordinates: 11°35′01″N 79°41′48″E
- Country: India
- State: Tamil Nadu
- District: Cuddalore
- Taluk: Kurinjipadi

Government
  - Type: Sarpanch

Area
  - Total: 2.39 km^{2} (0.92 sq mi)
- Elevation: 6 m (20 ft)

Population (2011)
  - Total: 734
  - Density: 307/km^{2} (795/sq mi)

Languages
  - Official: Tamil
- Time zone: UTC+5:30 (IST)
- PIN: 608801
- STD code: 04142
- Vehicle registration: TN-31

Tanur is a village in Kurinjipadi Taluk, Cuddalore District, Tamil Nadu, India. It is located near the eastern coast of India, approximately 20 kilometres southwest of the district capital Cuddalore, and 11 kilometres east of the taluk capital Kurinjipadi. In the year 2011, the village had a population of 734.

== Geography ==
Tanur lies on the eastern shore of Perumal Lake. It covers an area of 239.04 hectares.

== Demographics ==
According to the 2011 Census of India, there were 174 households in Tanur. Among the local population, 365 were male and 369 were female. The literacy rate was 70.44%, with 269 of the male population and 248 of the female population being literate.
