= Kammapuram block =

Kammapuram block is a revenue block of Cuddalore district of the Indian state of Tamil Nadu. This revenue block consist of 53 panchayat villages.

== List of Members ==
SI.No	Village
SI.No	Panchayat Village
1	A.Valliam
2	Devangudi
3	Irulakurichi
4	Kammapuram
5	Kavanur
6	Ko.Athanur
7	Koonankurichi
8	Kottumulai
9	Melapalaiyur
10	Mummudicholagan
11	Neyveli
12	Periyakappankulam
13	Peruvarappur
14	Seplanatham North
15	Su.Keenanur
16	U.Adhanur
17	U.Mangalam
18	V.Kumaramangalam
19	Ammeri
20	Dharmanallur
21	Iruppu
22	Karkudal
23	Keelapalaiyur
24	Ko.Mavidnathal
25	Kottagam
26	Manakollai
27	Melpathi
28	Muthanai
29	Palakollai
30	Periyakurichi
31	Sathamangalam
32	Seplanatham South
33	T.Pavalangudi
34	U.Agaram
35	Uthangal
36	Vadakku Vellore
37	C.Keeranur
38	Gopalapuram
39	Iruppukurichi
40	Karmangudi
41	Keelpathi
42	Kolliruppu
43	Kotteri
44	Marugur
45	Mudapuli
46	Nadiapattu
47	Palayapattinam
48	Perundurai
49	Sathapadi
50	Siruvarappur
51	Tholur
52	U.Kolapakkam
53	Uyyakondaravi
