= Tanur =

Tanur may refer to:

== Places ==
- Tanur, Malappuram, a town in Kerala, India
- Tanur (State Assembly constituency), Kerala
- Tanur, Cuddalore, a village in Tamil Nadu, India
- Kingdom of Tanur, a medieval principality seated in Tanur, India
- Tanur-e Boland, Iran
- The Tanur Cave (or the Tabun Cave), an archaeological site in Israel

== Other ==
- Tabun oven (tannour), name originally given for clay oven (Hebrew and Arabic)
