= South Arcot District (Madras Presidency) =

Coordinates: 11°30′N 79°25′E

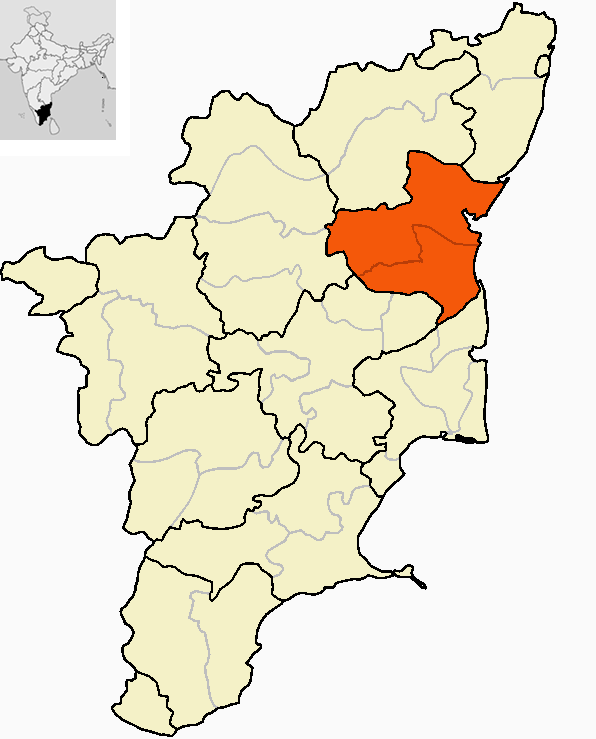
Map of South Arcot district

South Arcot District was a district in the Madras Presidency of British India. It covered the area of the present-day districts of Cuddalore, Kallakurichi and Viluppuram in the Indian state of Tamil Nadu. The district was divided into eight taluks and covered a total area of 13,510 square kilometres (5,217 sq mi). The administrative headquarters was the town of Cuddalore.

In ancient times, South Arcot was a part of the Chola and the Pallava kingdoms. British presence in the district dates to 1690 when the British East India Company set up a factory at Fort St David near Cuddalore. South Arcot was the scene of confrontation between the British and the French and the British and Tipu Sultan. The British took over the administration in 1781 and established full sovereignty in 1801.

The economy is largely agricultural. South Arcot is noteworthy for lignite mines in Neyveli.

== History ==
South Arcot was the southern portion of the Mughal province (subah) of Arcot. In ancient times, the northern part of South Arcot was under the rule of the Pallavas while the southern part was a portion of the traditional Chola homeland. In the 14th century, South Arcot was conquered by the Delhi Sultanate and later, by Vijayanagar kings. In 1646, South Arcot came under the Bijapur sultans who ruled till 1676, when it was conquered by the Marathas. In 1698, the Mughal Emperor Aurangazeb took Gingee and established his rule over South Arcot.

The British presence dates back to 1682, when the British East India Company established a factory at Cuddalore and Kanimedu. When these two failed, the Company set up another factory at Fort St David near Cuddalore. Fort St David served as the temporary capital of Madras Presidency from 1746 onwards when Madras was taken by the French East India Company, till 1752. Cuddalore was taken by the French from 1758 to 1760, when it was retaken by the British. From 1767 to 1790, Hyder Ali and his son Tipu Sultan launched repeated attacks on the region.

The subah of Arcot was ceded to the British East India Company by the Nawab of the Carnatic in 1801, and subsequently the district was split into North Arcot and South Arcot. On 30 September 1993, South Arcot District was split into Cuddalore District and Villupuram District. Cuddalore was the capital of the erstwhile South Arcot district.

== Administration ==
South Arcot district was sub-divided into four sub-divisions:

- Pennathur sub-division: Tindivanam taluk, Tiruvannamalai (partly: pennathur) taluk and Villupuram taluk.
- Tirukkoyilur sub-division: Kallakurichi taluk and Tirukkoyilur taluk.
- Chidambaram sub-division: Chidambaram and Vriddhachalam taluks
- Cuddalore sub-division: Cuddalore taluk.

== Taluks ==
As of 1901, South Arcot district was sub-divided into eight taluks:

- Chidambaram (Area: 1,040 square kilometres (402 sq mi); Headquarters: Chidambaram)
- Cuddalore (Area: 1,160 square kilometres (448 sq mi); Headquarters: Cuddalore)
- Kallakurichi (Area: 2,260 square kilometres (873 sq mi); Headquarters: Kallakurichi)
- Tindivanam (Area: 2,110 square kilometres (816 sq mi); Headquarters: Tindivanam)
- Tirukkoyilur (Area: 1,510 square kilometres (584 sq mi); Headquarters: Tirukkoyilur)
- Tiruvannamalai (Area: 2,610 square kilometres (1,009 sq mi); Headquarters: Tiruvannamalai)
- Villupuram (Area: 1,320 square kilometres (509 sq mi); Headquarters: Villupuram)
- Vriddhachalam (Area: 1,490 square kilometres (576 sq mi); Headquarters: Vriddhachalam)
- Panruti;Headquarters:Panruti

== Demographics ==
South Arcot had a population of 2,349,894 in 1901 and was the third most populous district in Madras Presidency. 94 percent of the population were Hindus while 3 percent were Muslims and 3 percent Christian, of whom, 92 percent were Roman Catholics. Tamil is official language.

== Economy ==
The economy of the district is largely agricultural. Attempts were made in the early part of the 19th century to establish iron mine named Porto Novo Iron Works at Porto Novo but failed due to lack of fuel. The most important industrial units in the district were the East India Distilleries factories at Nellikuppam and Thiruvennainallur. Chidambaram was an important centre of cotton and silk weaving.

== Sources ==
- The Imperial Gazetteer of India, Volume 5. London: Clarendon Press. 1908.
