= Kovilampoondi Gram Panchayat =

Kovilampoondi Kovilam poondi
- Village Panchayat
- Location in Tamil Nadu, India Kovilampoondi (India)
- Coordinates: 11.421948°N 79.713235°E
- Country: India
- State: Tamil Nadu
- District: Cuddalore

Population (2011)
  - Total: 2,310

Languages
  - Official: Tamil
- Time zone: UTC+5:30 (IST)

Kovilampoondi Village Panchayat (Kovilampoondi Gram Panchayat) is located in the Portonova circle in Cuddalore district of Tamil Nadu. This panchayat falls under the Chidambaram Assembly Constituency and Chidambaram Lok Sabha Constituency. It has a total of 7 panchayat constituencies, with 7 Panchayat Council members elected from these constituencies. According to the 2011 India census, the total population is 2,310, comprising 1,182 females and 1,128 males.

== Basic facilities ==
The following information is compiled from the 2015 data of the Tamil Nadu Rural Development and Panchayat Department.

Basic Facilities	Total No.
Water Connections	85
Bore Motor Pump	
Hand Pump	48
Upper Level Reservoir Tanks	4
Bottom Level Reservoir Tanks	
Local Government Buildings	9
Government School Buildings	2
Ponds or Wells	17
Playground	1
Market	
Panchayat Union Roads	66
Panchayat Roads	23
Bus Stand	
Graveyard or Cremation Grounds	2

== Small villages ==
List of villages in this panchayat:

1. Kovilampoondi
