= Kurinjipadi taluk =

Coordinates: 11.57°N 79.60°E

Kurinjipadi taluk is a taluk of Cuddalore district of the Indian state of Tamil Naduwith its headquarters as the town of Kurinjipadi. Vadalur is the biggest Town and Municipality in this taluk, and Abiyam pettai is the biggest village in this taluk.

== Population ==
According to the 2011 census, the taluk of Kurinjipadi had a population of 331,299 with 167,444 males and 163,855 females. There were 978 women for every 1000 men. The taluk had a literacy rate of 74.10
