= Panjapatti Lake =

Lake in Tamil Nadu, India

Coordinates: 10°49′21″N 78°17′19″E

Panjapatti Lake is located in the Karur district of Tamil Nadu, India. Spanning 1,300 acres, this lake was constructed during British colonial rule in 1837.

Panjapatti Lake, situated in the Krishnarayapuram region, is the third largest lake in Tamil Nadu, following Veeranam and Kaveripakkam lakes. It has a storage capacity of 1.8 TMC (thousand million cubic feet), which surpasses the storage capacity of the nearby Mayanur Barrage, and it has the potential to irrigate approximately 40,000 acres of farmland.

The water feeding into Panjapatti Lake originates from the hilly regions of Kadavur and flows through several villages, including Palaviduthi, Tharagampatti, and P.udayapatty, filling around 24 lakes and 124 ponds (including udayapatty lake) along its route. The surplus water eventually reaches Panjapatti Lake at the tail end. When the lake fills to capacity, any excess water flows through the southern aqueduct and merges with the Cauvery River near Kudamuruti in Trichy.

Historically, more than 30,000 acres of farmland across 25 villages, including Velliyanai, Metupatti, Panjapatti, Tharasampatti, Kadavur, and others, relied on Panjapatti Lake for irrigation and drinking water. Until 2001, the lake was a vital water source for these communities. However, since then, the lake has gone dry due to the encroachment of seemai karuvelam (Prosopis juliflora) trees and a significant reduction in rainfall.

In recent years, the local farming community and residents have urged the district administration to channel water from the Mayanur Barrage, which is just 15 kilometers away, into the lake via pipelines or pumping stations. However, officials have stated that this plan is not feasible due to the lake's higher elevation (27 meters above ground level) compared to the barrage.

During the tenure of former Chief Minister K. Kamaraj, a proposal was made to divert water from the Jotharpalayam Cauvery River to Panjapatti Lake. Unfortunately, this plan was never implemented and remained on paper.
