= Cuddalore district =

- District of Tamil Nadu
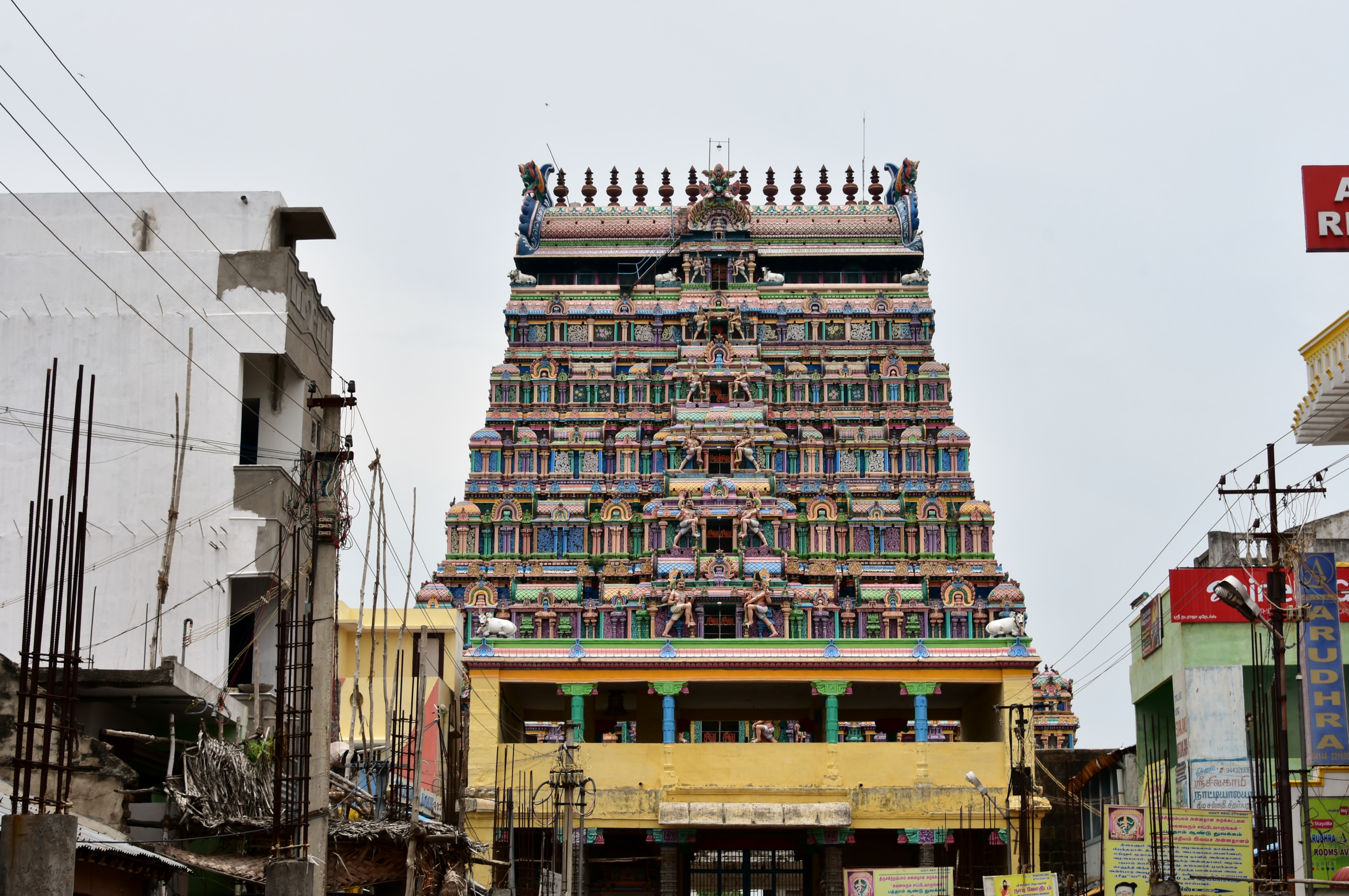
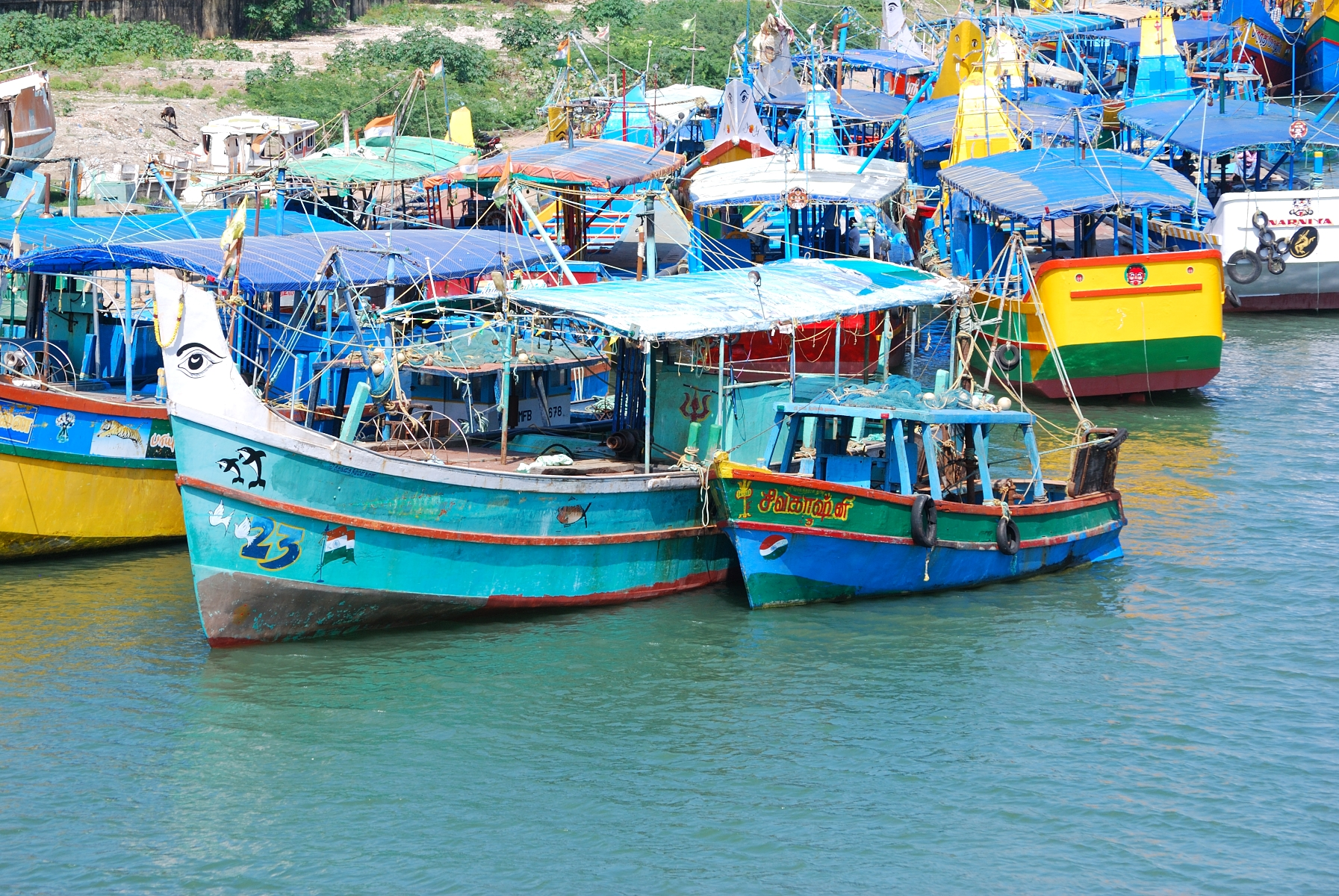
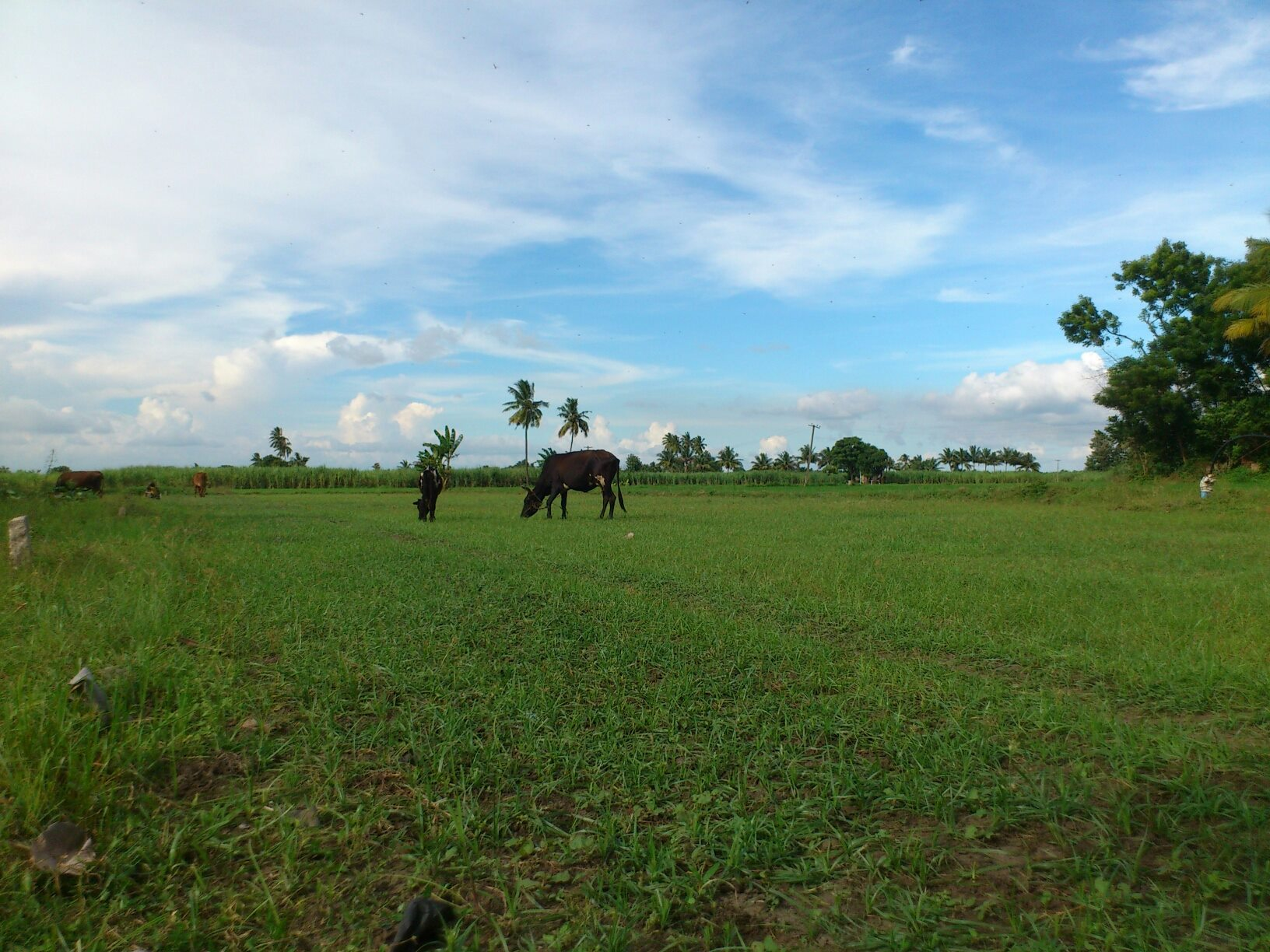
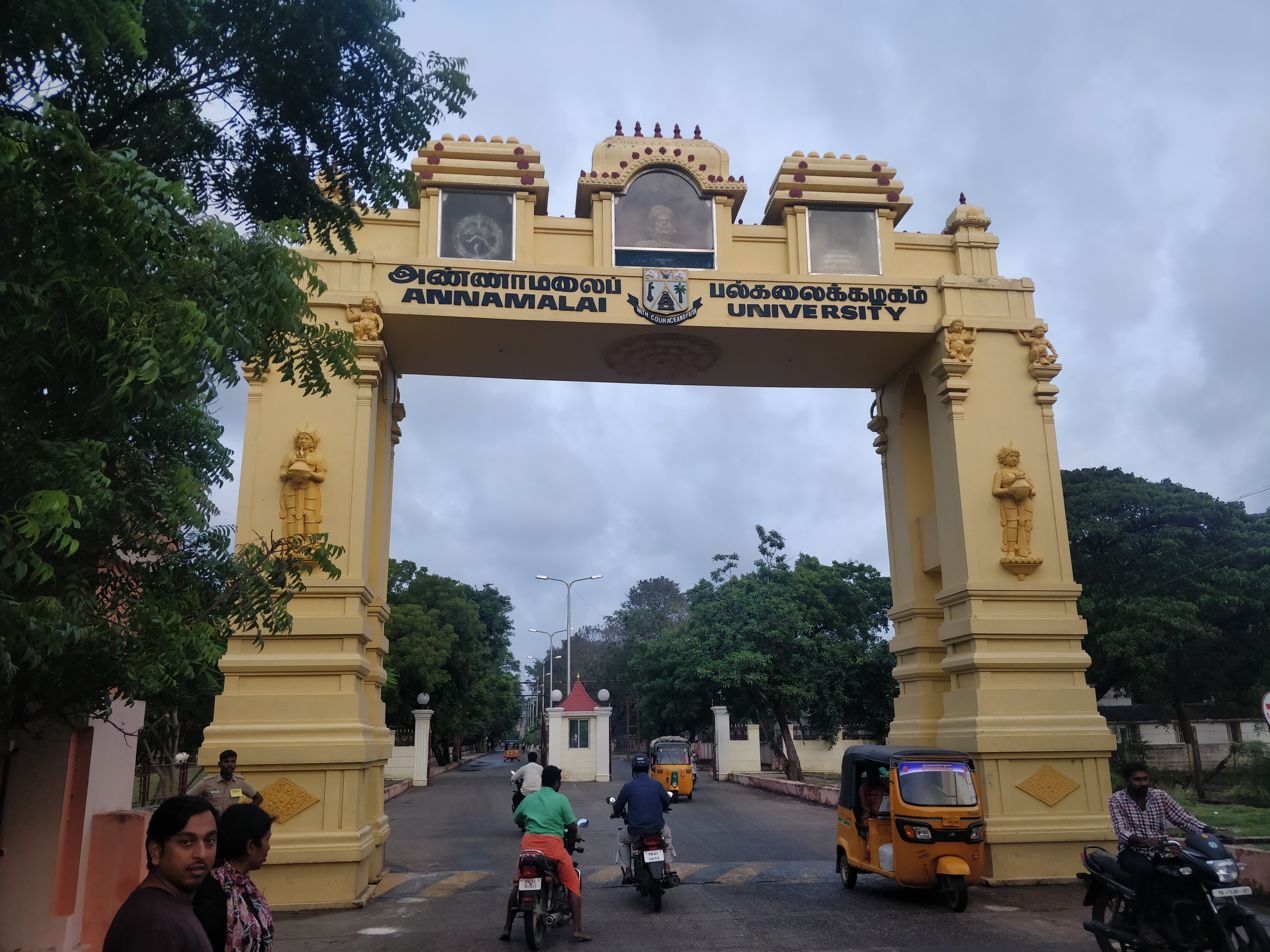
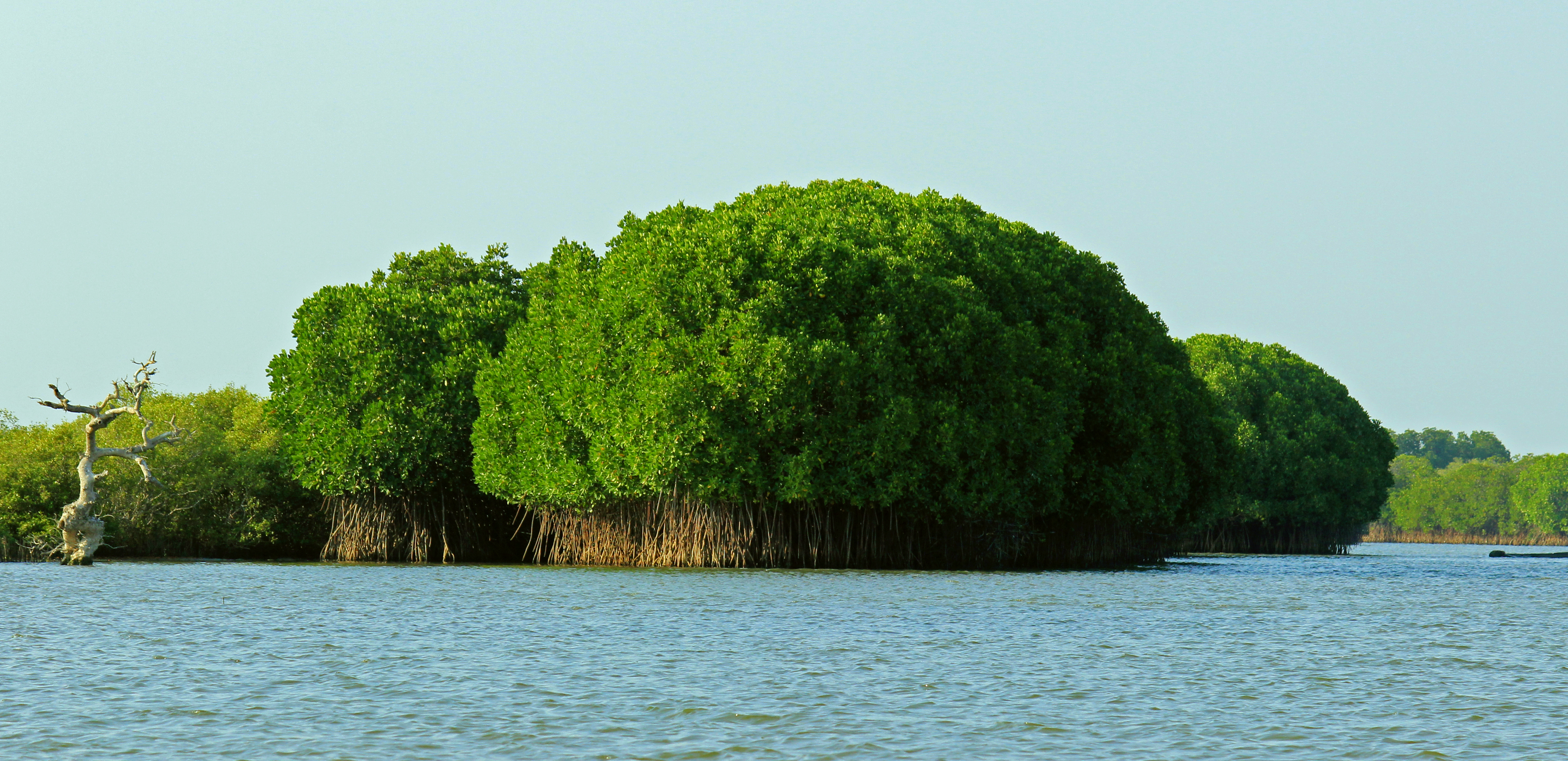
- Top: Nataraja Temple in Chidambaram, Boats in Cuddalore; Mid: Fields in Ganapathikurichi, Gate of Annamalai University; Bottom: Mangroves in Pichavaram
- Interactive map of Cuddalore district
- Coordinates: 11°45′0″N 79°45′0″E
- Country: India
- State: Tamil Nadu
- Headquarters: Cuddalore
- Taluks: Bhuvanagiri, Cuddalore, Chidambaram, Kattumannarkoil, kurinjipadi, Panruti, Titakudi, Srimushnam, Veppur, Vriddachalam

Government
  - District Collector: Sibi Adhithya Senthil Kumar, I.A.S, IAS
  - Superintendent of Police: S. Sakthi Ganesan, IPS

Population (2011)
  - Total: 2,605,914
  - Density: 702/km^{2} (1,820/sq mi)

Languages
  - Official: Tamil, English
- Time zone: UTC+5:30 (IST)
- PIN: 607xxx
- Telephone code: 91 04142
- ISO 3166 code: ISO 3166-2:IN
- Vehicle registration: TN-31, TN-91
- Largest city: Cuddalore
- Nearest city: Pondicherry, Chennai
- Sex ratio: 984 ♂/♀
- Literacy: 79.04%
- Legislature type: elected
- Vidhan Sabha constituency: Cuddalore
- Avg. summer temperature: 41 °C (106 °F)
- Avg. winter temperature: 20 °C (68 °F)
- Website: cuddalore.nic.in

Cuddalore district is one of the 38 districts in the state of Tamil Nadu in India, has Nataraja Shiva Temple and Pichavaram Mangrove Forest. The district headquarters is Cuddalore.

== History ==
Since ancient times, the old town has been a seaport. Through the centuries, Cuddalore has been subject to a number of foreign powers including the Netherlands, Portugal, France and more recently, the British. In the 1600s, the French and English came to Cuddalore for trade and business. The French established a settlement at Pondicherry and the British at Cuddalore. The French and English, while engaged in the Seven Years' War, fought the naval Battle of Cuddalore on 29 April 1758. It was an indecisive battle between a British squadron, under Vice-Admiral George Pocock and a French squadron, under Comte d'Aché and the newly appointed Governor General Comte Thomas Lally. Cuddalore surrendered to French troops on 29 April 1758.

From 1789 to 1794, there was further unrest in Cuddalore due to the War of American Independence and the Second Anglo-Mysore War culminating in the siege of Cuddalore, after which the town was returned to Britain as part of a peace treaty. In 1782, during the Second Anglo Mysore war, the French troops allied with Tipu Sultan and won over the British, after which Cuddalore became a chief port against the French. In 1783, General James Stuart (1735–1793) led his troops to fend off French troops. There were five different naval actions off the coast during the same year, all of which were indecisive.

Some streets in Cuddalore retain British names such as Clive Street, Wellington Street, Sloper Street, Canning Street, Rope Street (Rope Street, Wellington Street, Sloper Street and Canning Street jointly known as Salangukara Village), Lawrence Road and Imperial Road. The Cuddalore Central Prison, opened in 1865, is an historically important landmark. Subramanya Bharathi and other political leaders served prison terms there.

Cuddalore district is prone to natural calamities having experienced landfalls of major cyclones formed in the Bay of Bengal region. Apart from the cyclones, 2004 Tsunami caused massive damages to life and property in Cuddalore and its adjacent Nagapattinam district. Cyclone Thane, which made landfall here, caused major loss to life and property.

Tsunami waves that followed the 2004 Indian Ocean earthquake near Sumatra hit the eastern coast of India on 26 December 2004 at 08:32 am, resulting in 572 casualties. Several fishing hamlets disappeared, while Silver Beach and the historically important Cuddalore Port were devastated. Fort St. David survived without damage. In 2012, Cyclone Thane caused widespread damage to crops and buildings.

Cuddalore district was among those most severely affected by the 2015 South India floods. Six of the district's 13 blocks suffered extensive damage during the floods in November. The resumption of heavy rainfall from 1 December once again inundated the Cuddalore municipality and the district, displacing tens of thousands of people. Rains continued through 9 December. Despite the state government and individuals sending rescue teams and tonnes of relief materials to the district, thousands of those affected continued to lack basic supplies due to inadequate distribution efforts; this resulted in several relief lorries being stopped and looted by survivors. Large swaths of Cuddalore city and the district remained inundated as of 10 December, with thousands of residents marooned by floodwaters and over 60,000 hectares (150,000 acres; 600,000,000 m^{2}) of farmland inundated; over 30,000 people had been evacuated to relief camps.

== Geography ==
The district has an area of 3,564 km^{2}. It is bounded on the north by Viluppuram District and Kallakurichi district, on the east by the Bay of Bengal, on the northeast by Puducherry district of the union territory Puducherry, on the south by Mayiladuthurai district, on the west by Perambalur District and by a small part with Thanjavur district. The district is drained by Gadilam, Uppanar and Ponnaiyar rivers in the north, Vellar and Kollidam River (Coleroon) in the south.

== Economy ==
In 2006 the Ministry of Panchayati Raj named Cuddalore one of the country's 250 most backward districts (out of a total of 640). It is one of the six districts in Tamil Nadu currently receiving funds from the Backward Regions Grant Fund Programme (BRGF).

== Demographics ==
Historical population
Year	Pop.	±% p.a.
1901	868,748	—
1911	974,673	+1.16%
1921	957,148	−0.18%
1931	1,012,603	+0.56%
1941	1,076,237	+0.61%
1951	1,145,551	+0.63%
1961	1,300,513	+1.28%
1971	1,569,323	+1.90%
1981	1,827,917	+1.54%
1991	2,122,759	+1.51%
2001	2,285,395	+0.74%
2011	2,605,914	+1.32%

Languages of Cuddalore district (2011)
1. Tamil (97.6%)
2. Others (2.41%)

Religions in Cuddalore district (2011)
Religion	Percent
Hinduism	94.78%
Islam	2.75%
Christianity	2.20%
Other or not stated	0.27%

According to 2011 census, Cuddalore district had a population of 2,605,914 with a sex-ratio of 987 females for every 1,000 males, much above the national average of 929. 33.97% of the population lived in urban areas. A total of 279,950 were under the age of six, constituting 147,644 males and 132,306 females. Scheduled Castes and Scheduled Tribes accounted for 29.32% and 0.6% of the population, respectively. The average literacy of the district was 79%, compared to the national average of 72.99%. The district had a total of 635,578 households. There were a total of 1,169,880 workers, comprising 136,035 cultivators, 325,599 main agricultural labourers, 19,151 in house hold industries, 356,486 other workers, 332,609 marginal workers, 29,135 marginal cultivators, 213,813 marginal agricultural labourers, 12,876 marginal workers in household industries and 76,785 other marginal workers. The district has a population density of 702 inhabitants per square kilometre (1,820/sq mi).

At the time of the 2011 census, 97.59% of the population spoke Tamil and 2.41% of population soke other regional Indian languages.

== Politics ==
District	No.	Constituency	Name	Party	Alliance	Remarks
Cuddalore	151	Tittakudi (SC)	C. V. Ganesan	DMK	SPA	
Cuddalore	152	Vriddhachalam	Premallatha Vijayakant	DMDK	SPA	
Cuddalore	153	Neyveli	R. Rajendran	AIADMK	AIADMK+	Opposed TVK
Cuddalore	154	Panruti	K. Mohan	AIADMK	AIADMK+	Supported TVK; Later declared support for EPS
Cuddalore	155	Cuddalore	B. Rajkumar	TVK	TVK+	Cabinet Minister
Cuddalore	156	Kurinjipadi	M. R. K. Panneerselvam	DMK	SPA	
Cuddalore	157	Bhuvanagiri	A. Arunmozhithevan	AIADMK	AIADMK+	Supported TVK; Later declared support for EPS
Cuddalore	158	Chidambaram	M. Thamimum Ansari	DMK	SPA	
Cuddalore	159	Kattumannarkoil (SC)	L. E. Jothimani	VCK	TVK+	Won as SPA candidate; party switched to TVK+ post-election

== Divisions ==
Cuddalore District comprises 10 taluks, 13 Blocks, 1 Municipal corporation 6 Municipalities and 16 Town Panchayats.

Municipal corporation

- Cuddalore

Municipality

- Chidambaram
- Thittakudi
- Nellikuppam
- Panruti
- Vadalur
- Virudhachalam

Town Panchayat

- Annamalai Nagar
- Bhuvanagiri
- Gangaikondan
- Kattumannarkoil
- Killai
- Kurinjipadi
- Sethiyathope
- Thorapadi
- Parangipettai
- Pennadam
- Mangalampet
- Melpattampakkam
- Lalpet
- Srimushnam

Taluks

- Bhuvanagiri
- Chidambaram
- Cuddalore
- Kattumannarkoil
- Panruti
- Srimushnam
- Tittakudi
- Kurinjipadi
- Veppur
- Vriddachalam

Revenue block

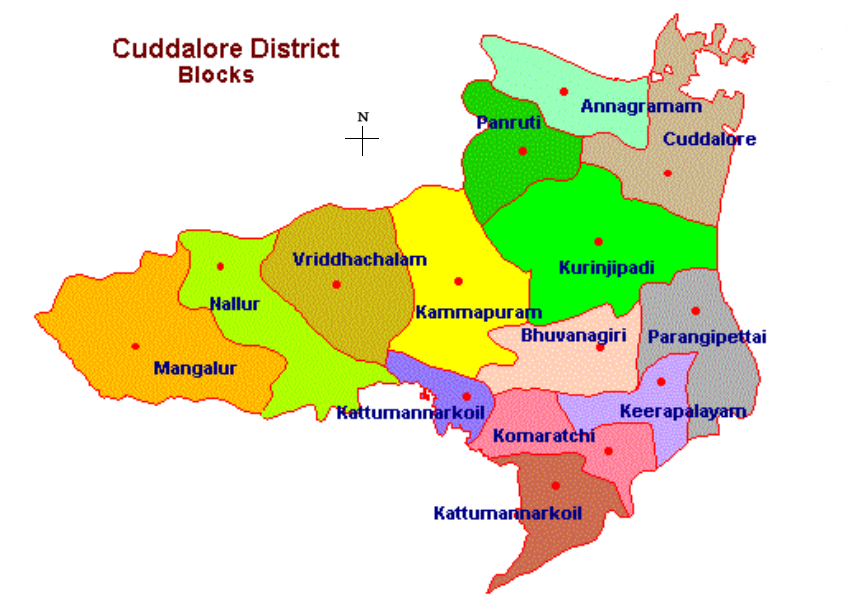
Revenue Blocks - CUD

- Annagramam
- Bhuvanagiri
- Cuddalore
- Kammapuram
- Kattumannarkoil
- Keerapalayam
- Komaratchi
- Kurinjipadi
- Mangalur
- Nallur
- Panruti
- Parangipettai
- Vriddhachalam

Revenue division

- Chidambaram
- Cuddalore
- Vriddachalam

== Urban centres ==
Cuddalore district consists of the following urban regions (cities):

- Bhuvanagiri
- Chidambaram
- Cuddalore
- Kattumannarkoil
- Kurinjipadi
- Neyveli
- Nellikuppam
- Mangalampet
- Melpattampakkam
- Panruti
- Pennadam
- Srimushnam
- Tittakudi
- Vadalur
- Virudhachalam

== Agriculture ==
Important crops grown in the district include paddy, sugarcane, groundnut, cumbu, maize, cashew, pulses (Blackgram and Greengram), tapioca, jackfruit, guava and brinjal. The most important cash crop of the district is cashew. Sugarcane is the next most important cash crop of the District (Cuddalore is also known as the Sugarbowl of Tamil Nadu). Many cashew processing units are located in Panrutiblocks. EID Parry, located in Nellikuppam, near Cuddalore, undertakes most of the sugarcane-related procurement and processing from the growers and is supplied to some other mills and mill towns located in the district, such as Moongilthuraipattu and Thirupathur.

== Tourist attractions ==
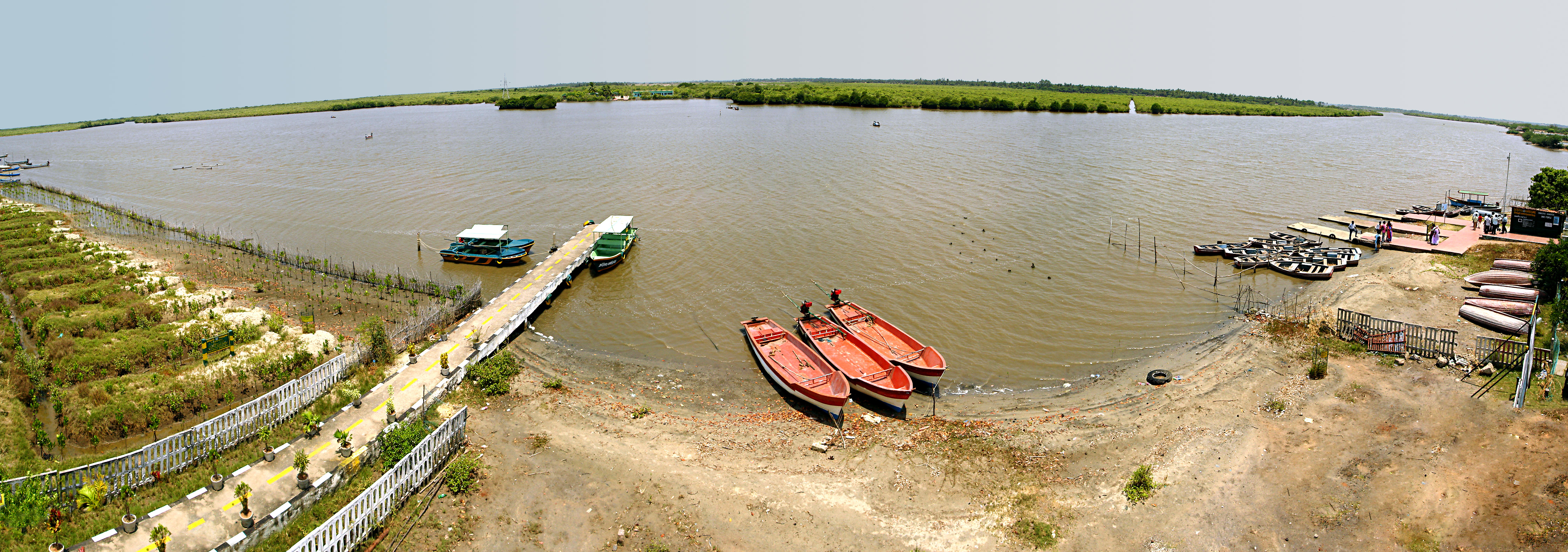
Pichavaram

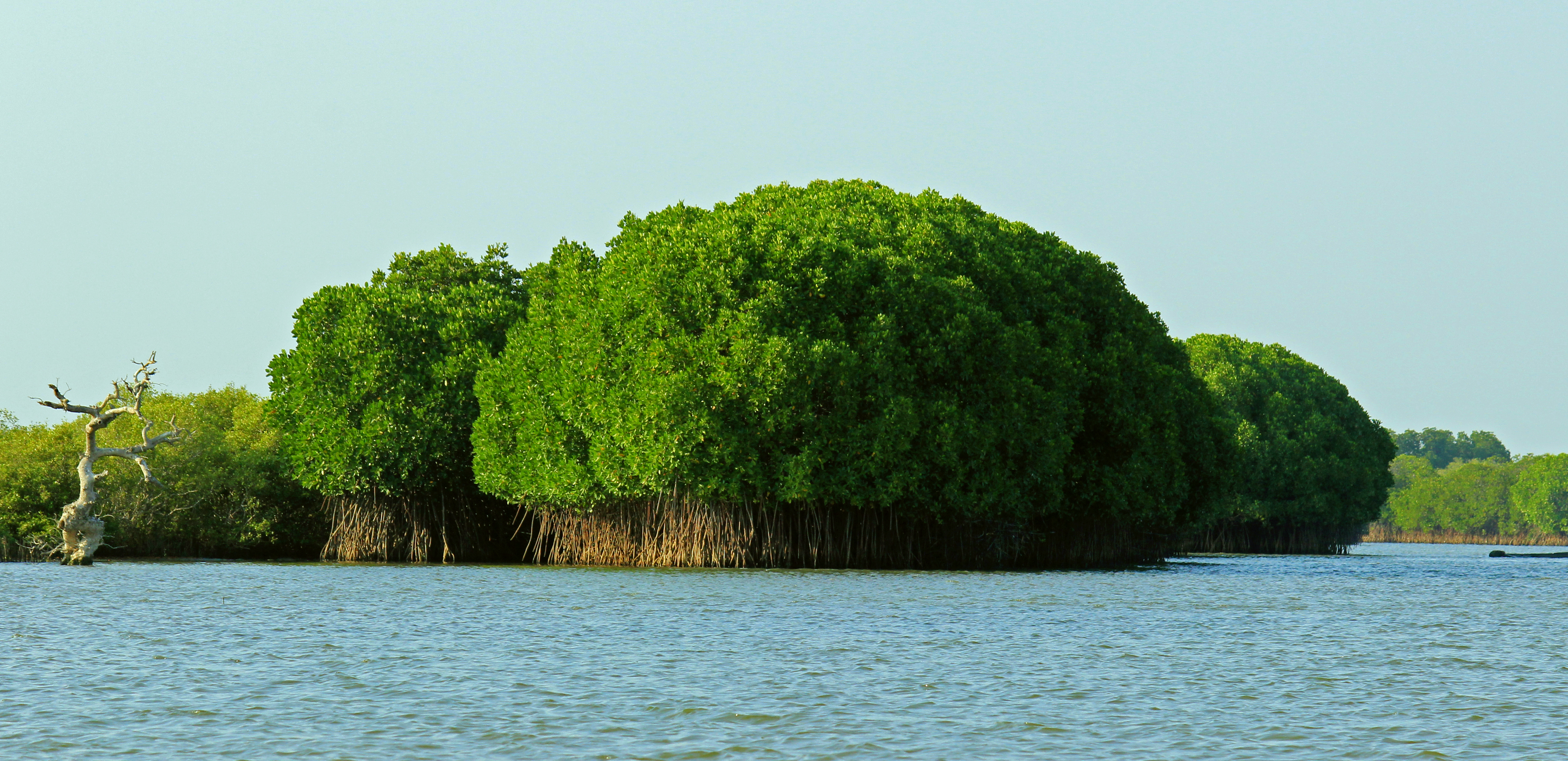
Pichavaram Forest

- Pichavaram, one of the world's largest mangrove forests

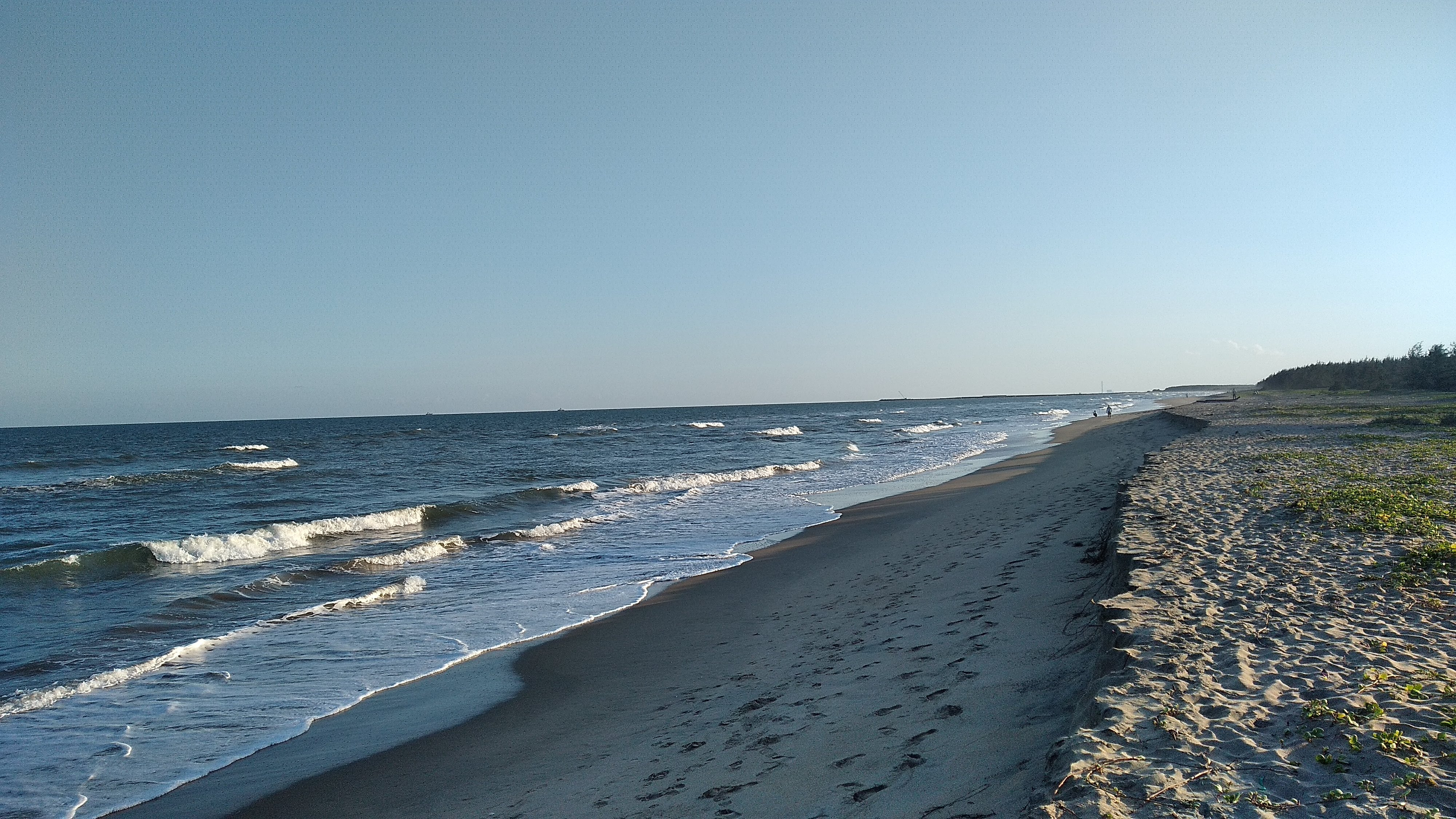
Silver beach

- Silver Beach at Devanampatinam (Cuddalore)
- Satyagnana Sabha (சத்ய ஞான சபை, Temple of Wisdom is a temple constructed (25.01.1872) by the saint Sri Raamalinga Swaamigal (Vallalaar) in the town of Vadalur in Cuddalore district, Tamil Nadu, India. It is an octagonal structure; the sanctum sanctorum of this temple is concealed from the main hall by seven curtains which are parted only on the Thai Poosam day. All the four towers of the Chidambaram Nataraajar temple are visible from the sabha. Ramalinga Swamigal, often called Vallalar, established the Sathyagnana Sabhai. He built a temple which is open year-round. Thousands of visitors attend festivals and monthly puja dates at this temple. Vadalur is well connected by rail and road, and it provides transport to major cities like Trichy, Chennai, Tanjore, Puducherry, and Kumbakonam.
- Veeranam Lake, Kattumannarkoil
- Marine Biology, Parangipettai, Chidambaram taluk
- Saamiyaarpettai Beach, near Parangipettai, Chidambaram taluk

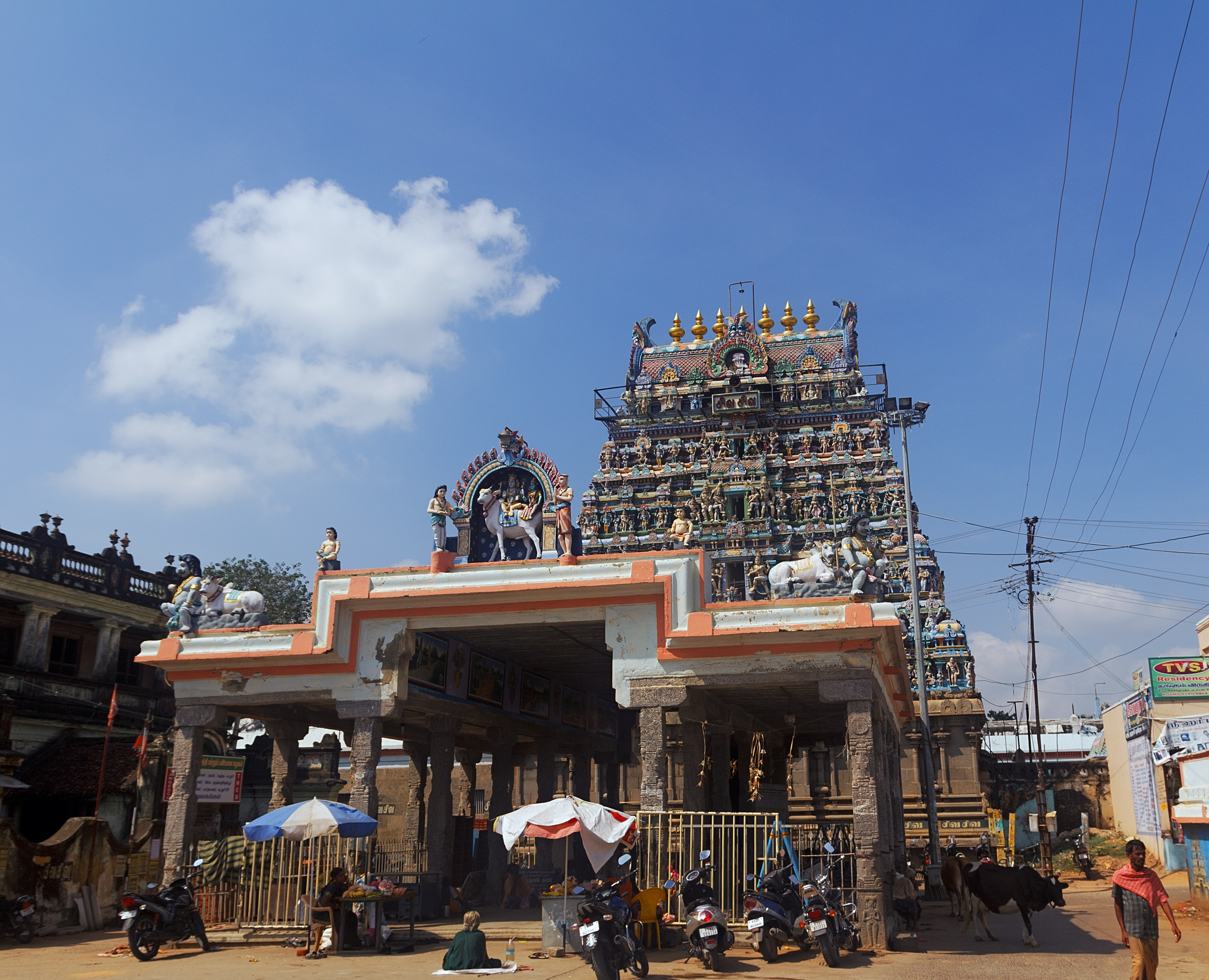
Pataleeshwarar temple

- Pataleeswarar temple, a Hindu temple, built during the 7th century is the most prominent landmark in Cuddalore. The name, Thirupathipuliyur, is associated with the legend behind the temple. The temple is revered in the verses of 7th-century Saiva saints Appar and Tirugnanasambandar in their works in Tevaram.

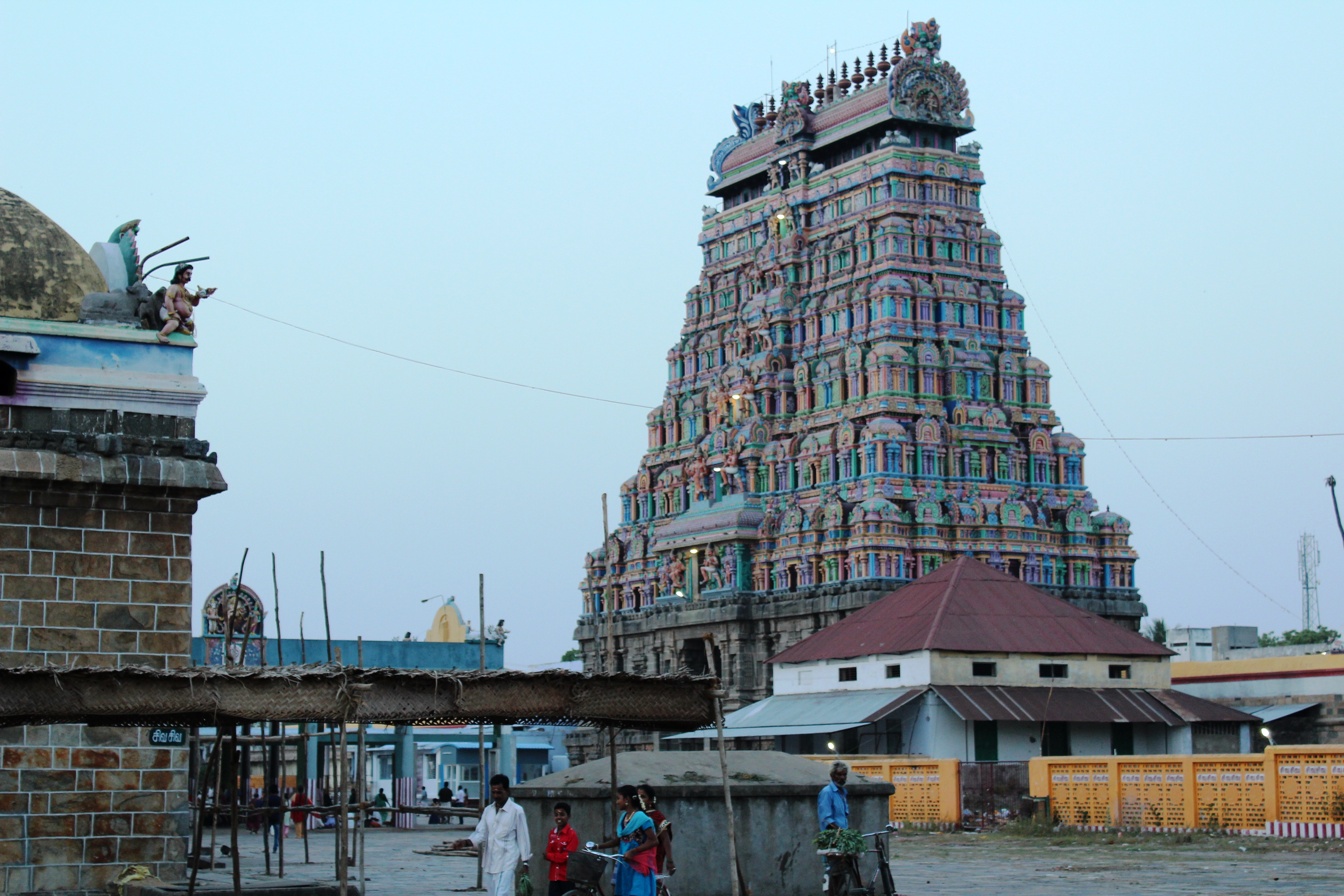
Chidambaram Natarajar Temple

- Chidambaram Natarajar Temple

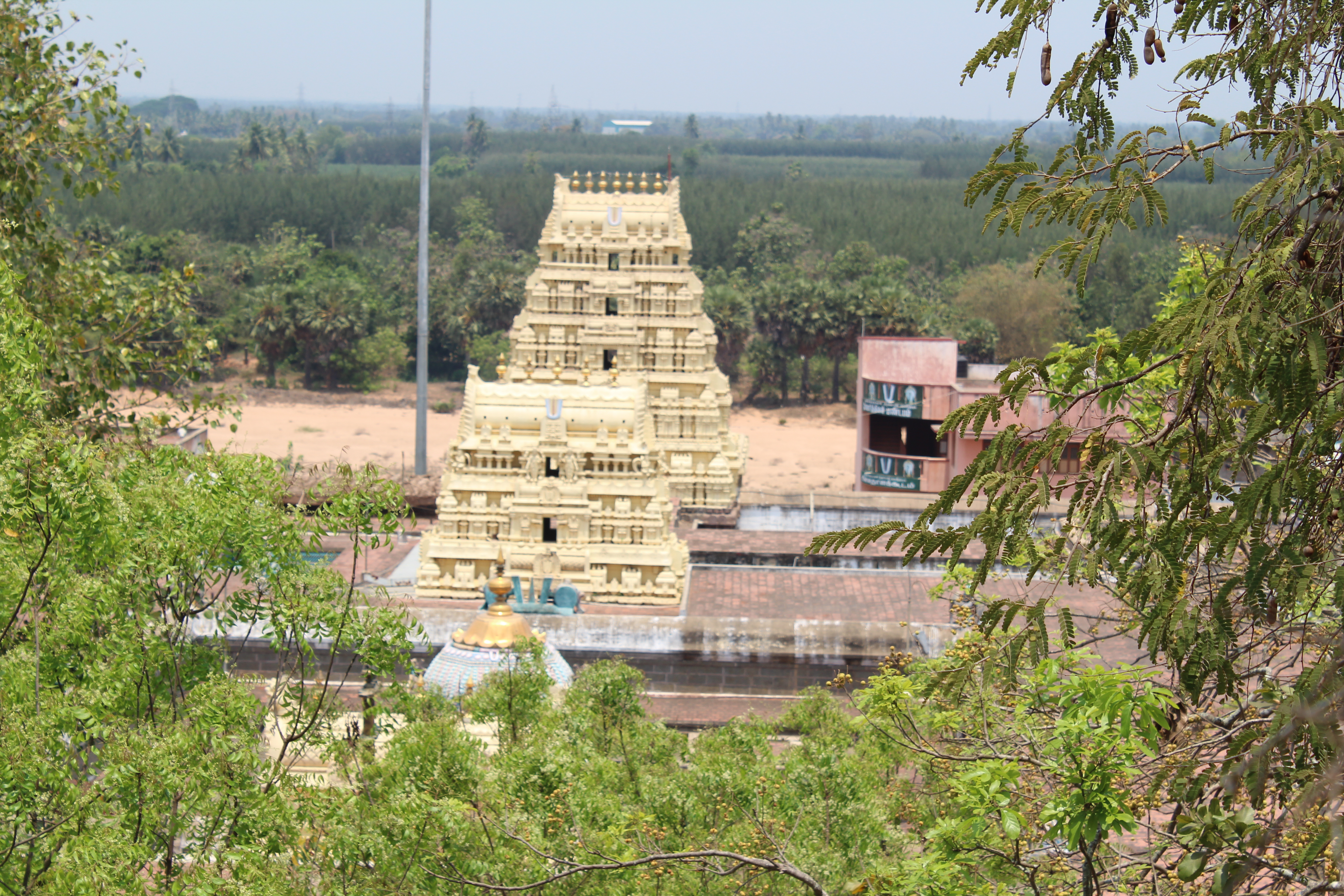
Devanathaswamy temple

- The Devanathaswami Temple, located in Thiruvanthipuram, is another Hindu pilgrimage site located in the outskirts of Cuddalore.
- Veerattaneswarar Temple, near Panruti
- Bhu Varaha Swamy temple, Sri Nithishwarar temple, Srimushnam
- Virudhagireeswarar temple,Virudhachalam

== Villages ==
- Kachirayanatham
- Lalpet
- Rayanallur Village
- Silambinathanpettai
- Uyyakondaravi
- Valasakkadu
- Vazhmangalam
- Veenangeni
- Veerattikuppam
- Ivathakudi village

== See also ==
- List of districts of Tamil Nadu
- List of educational institutions in Cuddalore District
