= Veenangeni =

- Location within Tamil Nadu
- Coordinates: 11.09901°N 79.390106°E
- Country: India
- State: Tamil Nadu
- District: Cuddalore district
- Town: Vadalur
- Postal code: 607303

Veenangeni is a small village near Vadalur town, in Cuddalore district, in the state of Tamil Nadu, in India. Veenangeni is the gateway for entering into the village Mettukkuppam, where saint Vallalar Ramalinga Swamigal spent the end of his life.
