= Kuppupillai chavadi =

Kuppupillai Chavadi is a small village of Kattumannarkoil Town, Cuddalore district, Tamil Nadu, India. It is the 16th ward of Kattumannarkoil municipality.

== Geography ==
Kuppupillai Chavadi consists of two streets, North street & South street. It is located 2 km away from Kattumannarkoil Bus stand.
