= Satyagnana Sabha, Vadalur =

Sabai
- Sathya Gnana Sabai
- Interactive map of Sabai
- Coordinates: 11.548419°N 79.54583°E
- Country: India
- Established: 25.01.1872
- Founder: Ramalinga Swamigal (Vallalar)

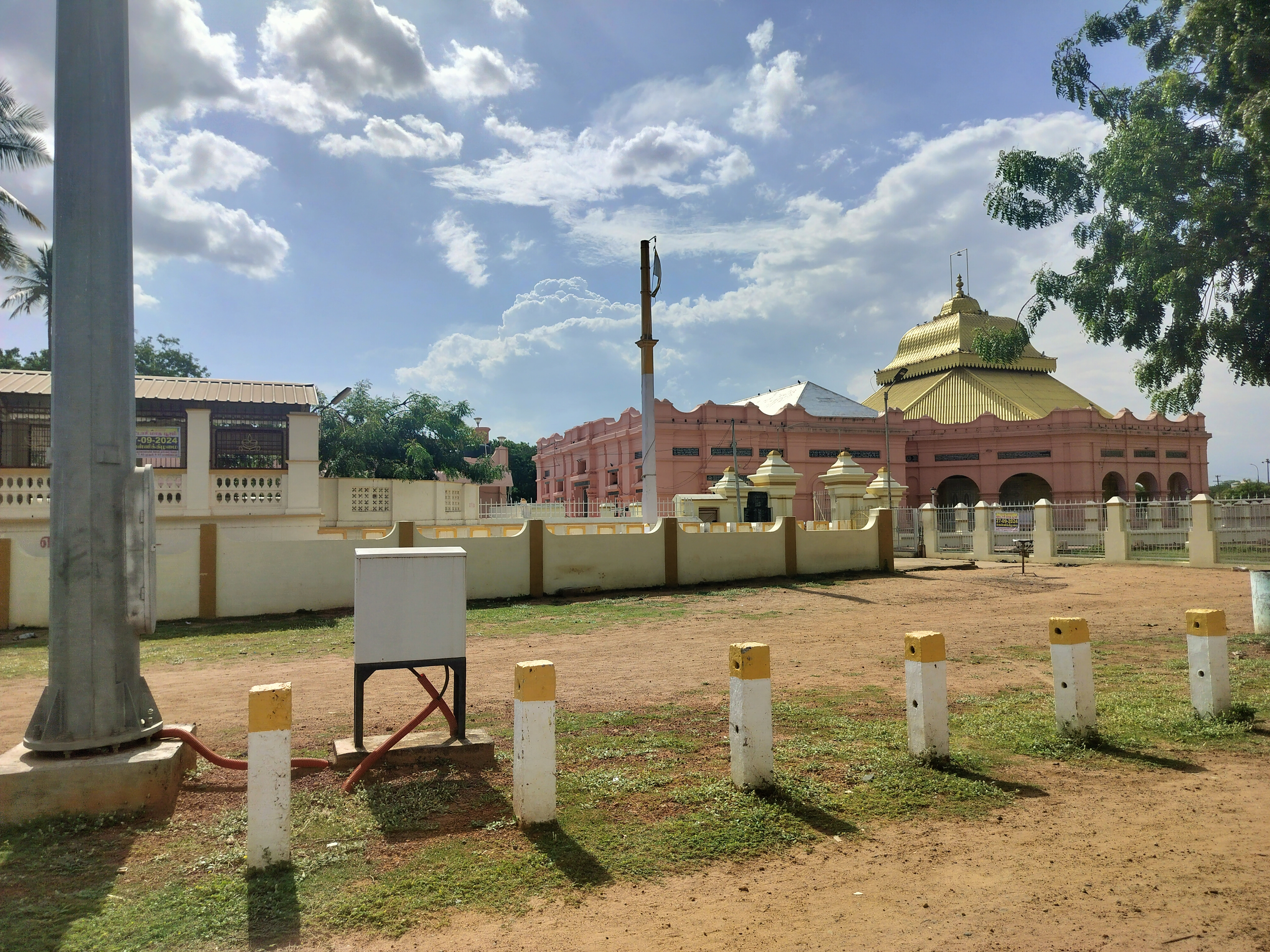
Sathya Gnana Sabha in Vadalur, Cuddalore District, Tamil Nadu, India.

Sathya Gnana Sabai (lit. 'Hall of True Knowledge', Tamil: Cattiya ñāṉa capai), is a temple constructed in 1872 by saint Sri Raamalinga Swaamigal, also known as Vallalaar, in the town of Vadalur in Cuddalore district, In the Indian state of Tamil Nadu. The temple is open to people of all castes except those who eat meat, who are allowed to worship only outside. Ramalinga wrote in detail about the pooja to be performed in Gnana Sabhai — visitors below 12 or above 72 years of age were expected to enter Gnana Sabhai and do poojas.

== Design ==
It is an octagonal structure; its sanctum sanctorum is concealed from the main hall by seven curtains that are parted only on Thai Poosam day. The four towers of the Chidambaram Nataraajar temple are visible from the sabha.

Sathya Gnana Sabha consists of three sabhas:

- The Chirchabai (சிற்சபை) which represents the moon or the left eye of people,
- The Porchabai (பொற்சபை) or golden sabha which represents the sun or the right eye
- The third Gnana sabha (ஞான சபை) which represents the third eye or the wisdom of people.

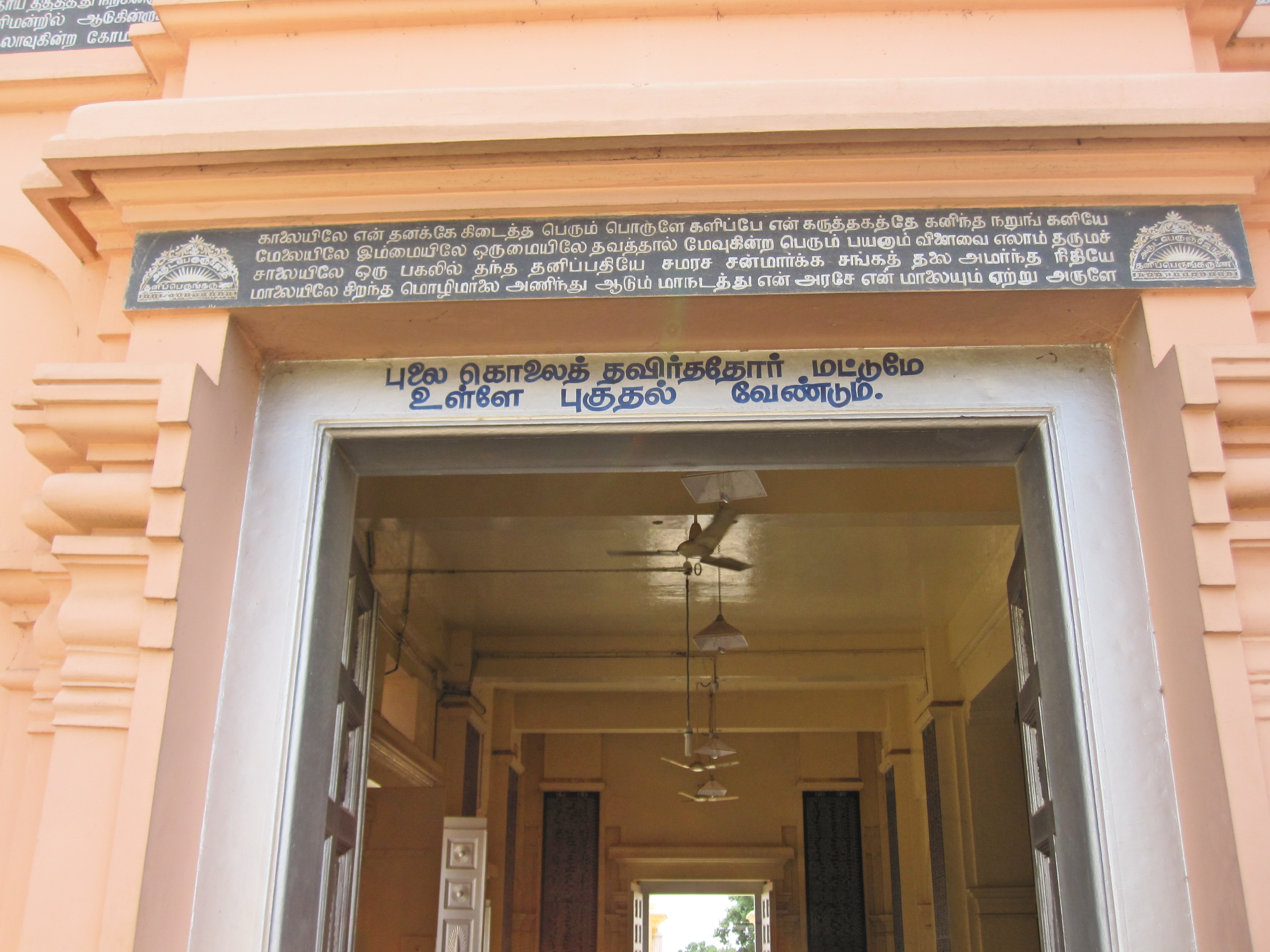
Entrance to the Sathya Gnana Sabha. The sign above it reads, "only those who have renounced meat and murder should enter".

The octagonal shape represents the 8 bones in the human skull. Only two Saints established Sangha (sabha) in Indian and World history. One is Gautama Buddha, another is Saint Vallalar. All Saivite madams are primarily for religious pupils, to which common people go only when a need arises. In contrast, a Sabha is a place where common people can go, join, organize and interact with spiritual people. Vallalar stated in a poem:

எச்சபை பொதுவென இயம்பினர் அறிஞர்கள் அச்சபை யிடங்கொள்ளும் அருட்பெருஞ் ஜோதி

- Transliteration: Eccapai potuveṉa iyampiṉar aṟiñarkaḷ accapai yiṭaṅkoḷḷum aruṭperuñ jōti
- Translation: This sabha is a common place for every one, who follows San maargam (good way)

The Dharma saalai is nearby; free food is offered to thousands of people there. The Dharma saalai has a stove that was lighted by Vallalar, which is still used for cooking. The jeeva samaadhi of Kalpattu Ayyaa is also near. He was the second san maargi attaining dheekshai from Vallalar.
