= Silambinathanpettai =

Silambinathanpettai is a village and panchayat of Cuddalore district, Tamil Nadu, India, located between Cuddalore and Panruti. The village has a population of 5,000. Silambinathanpettai is located near Patthirakottai and Saathamampattu. The village is located between Cuddalore, Panruti, Neyveli depicting its position to be at heart of these triangularly positioned cities.

The village is known for the Cashew and Jackfruit. Silambinathanpettai has more than 500 hectares of cashew trees. The name Silambinathanpettai was said to have been coined during the 16th century due to the emergence of a number of youth with skills in the art silambam. The village pin code is 607102. Silambinathanpettai Grampanchayat villages (Silambinathanpettai, Pathirakottai, Arachekuppam, Pattikuppam, Puthukuppam, Pazhaya Pathirakottai).
