= Cuddalore division =

- Revenue division
- Interactive map of Cuddalore division
- Coordinates: 11.75°N 79.75°E
- Country: India
- State: Tamil Nadu
- District: Cuddalore

Cuddalore division is a revenue division in the Cuddalore district of Tamil Nadu, India.
