= Vriddachalam taluk =

Coordinates: 11.50°N 79.33°E

Vriddachalam taluk is a taluk of Cuddalore district of the Indian state of Tamil Nadu. The headquarters of the taluk is the town of Virudhachalam.

== Demographics ==
According to the 2011 census, the taluk of Vriddachalam had a population of 423,035 with 215,798 males and 207,237 females. There were 960 women for every 1,000 men. The taluk had a literacy rate of 68.89%. Child population in the age group below 6 was 25,082 Males and 21,572 Females.
