= Mangalampet =

KUMARAN, Mangalampettai
- city
- Nickname: MPT
- Location in Tamil Nadu, India
- Coordinates: 11.634331°N 79.281678°E
- Country: India
- State: Tamil Nadu
- District: Cuddalore

Government
  - Type: town panchayat

Population (2011)
  - Total: 1,000,000

Languages
  - Official: Tamil
- Time zone: UTC+5:30 (IST)
- PIN: 606 104

Mangalampet is a panchayat town in Cuddalore district in the Indian state of Tamil Nadu.

== Demographics ==
As of 2011 India census, Mangalampet had a population of 7,327 of which 3,590 are male and 3,737 are female. Mangalampet has an average literacy rate of 85.30%, higher than the national average of 80.09%: male literacy is 91.80%, and female literacy is 78.78%. In Mangalampet, 11.85% of the population is under 6 years of age.
