= Vriddachalam division =

Coordinates: 11.50°N 79.33°E

Vriddachalam division is a revenue division in the Cuddalore district of Tamil Nadu, India.
