= Annamalai Nagar =

- Town
- Location in Tamil Nadu, India
- Coordinates: 11°23′48″N 79°42′58″E
- Country: India
- State: Tamil Nadu
- District: Cuddalore

Population (2001)
  - Total: 8,974

Languages
  - Official: Tamil
- Time zone: UTC+5:30 (IST)
- PIN: 608002
- Telephone code: 04144
- Vehicle registration: TN-91( TN-31 till Jun17,2015)

Annamalai Nagar is a special grade Panchayat town in Cuddalore district in the state of Tamil Nadu, India. The town is named after Annamalai Chettiar, an Indian businessperson, educationist and philanthropist. The Annamalai University, founded by him, is located in Annamalai Nagar.

Chidambaram is the nearest train station and bus terminus.

== Demographics ==
As of 2011's India census, Annamalai Nagar had a population of 16289 of which 8646 are males and 7643 are females. The literacy rate of Annamalai Nagar city is 95.22%, higher than the state average of 80.09%, In Annamalai Nagar, Male literacy is around 97.53% while the female literacy rate is 92.59%. Panchayat has total administration of over 2,445 houses to which it supplies basic amenities like water and sewerage.
