= Komaratchi block =

Komaratchi block is a revenue block of Cuddalore district of the Indian state of Tamil Nadu. This revenue block consist of 57 panchayat villages.

== List of Panchayat Villages ==
They are,

SI.No	Panchayat Village
1	Agaranallur
2	C.Arasur
3	Chettikattalai
4	Elanankur
5	Kadavacherry
6	Keelaparuthikudi
7	Koothankoil
8	vandaiyar erupu
9	Ma.Udaiyur
10	Melaparuthikudi
11	Nandhimangalam
12	Neivasal
13	Poolamedu
14	Sarvarajanpettai
15	Sivayam
16	Thavarthampattu
17	Thirunaraiyur
18	Vadamoor
19	Varahoor
20	Alkondanatham
21	C.Thandeeswaranallur
22	Chidambaram (Non Municipal)
23	Elleri
24	Karuppur
25	Kilagundalapadi
26	Kuduvelichavadi
27	Ma.Kolakkudi
28	Madharsudamani
29	Mullankudi
30	Nanjalur
31	Parivilagam
32	Ruthirasolai
33	Sirakizhandanallur
34	Solakkur
35	Themmur
36	Usuppur
37	Vaiyur
38	Vellur
39	Athipattu
40	C.Vakkaramari
41	Edaiyar
42	Jayankondapattinam
43	Kattukudalur
44	Kilathangudi
45	Kumaratchi
46	Ma.Puliyankudi
47	Meiyathur
48	Nalamputhur
49	Nedumbur
50	Perampattu
51	Saliyanthoppu
52	Sivapuri
53	T.Puthur
54	Therkkumangudi
55	Vadakkumangudi
56	Vallampadugai
57	Vennaiyur
