= Sethiathoppu =

Sethiathoppu Sethiyathope
- Panchayat town
- Location in Tamil Nadu, India
- Coordinates: 11.26°N 79.32°E
- Country: India
- State: Tamil Nadu
- District: Cuddalore

Government
  - President: K.V.Kulothungan

Area
  - Total: 14 km^{2} (5.4 sq mi)

Population (2011)
  - Total: 10,547

Languages
  - Official: Tamil
- Time zone: UTC+5:30 (IST)
- PIN: 608702
- Telephone code: 91-04144
- Vehicle registration: TN-91(TN-31 till Jun 17,2015), Now TN -91.

Sethiathoppu (Tamil: [seːttijaːttoːppɯ]) is a panchayat town in Bhuvanagiri, Tamil Nadu. It is situated on a crossroads of the Chennai–Thanjavur (National Highway 24) highway. The town was established as a civilian town by the Cholas in the 11th century C.E. According to Tamil scholars, Sethiathoppu was formed as a settlement when Chola king Rajendra I moved his capital from Thanjavur to Gangaikonda Cholapuram, which lies 20 km south.

The town is named after Sethiyaar, a landlord, who used to own land in Thoppu, on the banks of the Vellar River.

== Demographics ==
According to the 2001 Census of India, Sethiyathoppu had a population of 7,962. Males constituted 52% of the population and females 48%. The town had an average literacy rate of 72%, higher than the national average of 59.5%; male literacy was 80% and female literacy was 64%. 10% of the population was under six years of age.
