= Kattumannarkoil block =

Coordinates: 11.2727°N 79.5555°E

Kattumannarkoil block is a revenue block of Cuddalore district of the Indian state of Tamil Nadu. This revenue block consist of 55 panchayat villages.Total area of Kattumannarkoil is 455 km^{2} including 406.38 km^{2} rural area and 48.74 km^{2} urban area.Kattumannarkoil has a population of 2,76,947 peoples. There are 67,752 houses in the sub-district. There are about 147 villages in Kattumannarkoil block .
