= Chidambaram division =

Coordinates: 11.4°N 79.7°E

Chidambaram division is a revenue division in the Cuddalore district of Tamil Nadu, India.
