= Lalpet =

Lalpet Lalpettai
- Town panchayat
- Location in Tamil Nadu, India
- Coordinates: 11.3027°N 79.5551°E
- Country: India
- State: Tamil Nadu
- District: Cuddalore
- Founder: Lal Khan

Population
  - Total: 50,197
  - Density: 65/km^{2} (170/sq mi)

Languages
  - Official: Tamil,
- Time zone: UTC+5:30 (IST)
- PIN: 608303
- Telephone code: 914144
- Vehicle registration: TN-91
- Sex ratio: 54:46 ♂/♀

Lalpet is a Panchayat town in Cuddalore district, Tamil Nadu. Lalpet is situated in lush green surrounding with water bodies. Lalpet was named after Lal Khan who held an administrative position under the ruling Prince Nawab of Arcot. Under the command of the prince, Lal Khan developed this town in 1775 for Arab traders, Muslims, international visitors and people of other faiths to dwell together peacefully. Arabic college named "Jamia Manba'ul Anwar" was established here in 1862. Lalpet was established before in 1775 by Lal Khan. Lalpet is a commune. Lalpet Commune consists of one census town and 8 panchayat villages. The town extends over an area of 16.425 km2.

== Population ==
As per the Census report, the total population of Lalpet is 16,561 out of which 8,209 are males and 8,352 are females thus the Average Sex Ratio of Lalpet is 1,017.

== History ==
=== Migration ===
Unverified sources suggest that around 12th century AD in Arab countries which later erupted in war. Those who settled in Lalpet and coastal regions of South India [Tamil Nadu and Kerala] are called Marakkars. The word Marakkar is usually derived from the Arabic ‘Markab’, a boat and

Labbay is large community in Lalpet. Labbays are said to have descended from traders who originated in the Persian Gulf,[1]. Since the late 13th century, Labbays specialized in the trade and manufacture of leather, tobacco, grains and spices from as far away as China and Southeast Asia. The community's name is derived from the Arabic phrase Labbay'k (Arabic: لبیک), which translates to "here I am."

=== People ===
People are identifiable and bounded only by a common language and religion. Otherwise, they belong to multiple ethnic backgrounds such as Arabian, Persian, Tamilan, Aryan, Oriental, Semitic, etc. Hence, their complexions range from fair to dark; facial bone structures range from sharp/oval to rounded. This was due to the frequent trading in South Asia. These races, by the 20th century, began to be listed as social classes in official gazettes of different nations as Lebbai, Marakayar, Rowther, and Dakhini (Deccani).

The majority of the locals work in abroad while many of the youths do business in the Middle East, Europe and South-East Asia. Some of locals have citizenship in other countries such UK, France, Maldives, Singapore, Malaysia, Brunei, Hong Kong, Laos and US. It shows that people of lalpet was spread all over the world. Other peoples are involved in business in and around Lalpet.

== Education ==
The total literacy rate of Lalpet is 89% which is more than the national literacy rate. Imam Gazzali School is the biggest school in Lalpet and Cuddalore district which has over 3000 students. There are not only many graduates are present in the town but also many male and female graduates are to come in the coming years. There is a Government High School that was started is 1960's which educate students from the town and its surrounding villages. An association called MUSLIM GRADUATES EDUCATIONAL SOCIETY was founded in 1990 by the graduates in the town to educate Muslim students. They started a school named IMAM GAZZALI Matric Hr Sec SCHOOL IN 1990. The school was then promoted to Matriculation school. Now, the school has three wings for boys, girls and kids also. Moreover, there are many private schools like Imam Buhari Nursery & Primary School, J.H (Jawamiul Hikam) Nursery & Primary School, Rahmath Nursery & Primary School, Iqra Nursery & Primary School, Saliheen academy Nursery & Primary School, Faizul Irfan Nursery & Primary School, Al Madina Nursery & Primary School, Jiya Nursery & Primary School, This will show the society about the interest of people of Lalpet about education.

Arabic college "Jamia Manba'ul Anwar" was established in 1862. This college is said to be the second-largest in Tamil Nadu after the famed Baki'aathus Salihaath of Vellore.

== Geography ==
Lalpet is covering approximately a land measurement of total area: 16.4 km^{2} (6.33 mi^{2}) and total distance: 18.19 km (11.3 mi^{2}). Lalpet Commune consists of 1 Census Town and 8 Panchayat villages.

Lalpet Commune wards: Lalpet-Town, Kollumedu-Village, Maniyam Adoor-Village, Kolitheru-Village, Elleri-Village, Vadakkukolkudi-Village, Kangiruppu-Village, JH Nagar-Village and Nathamalai-Village.

Where: It lies approximately 20 kilometres from the Chidambaram and 3 kilometres from the Kattumannarkoil town. Lalpet was established before in 1775 by Lal Khan.

Land measurement of Lalpet town alone. Total area: 8.22 km^{2} (3.18 mi^{2}) Total distance: 15.4 km (9.57 mi)

=== Nature ===
Veeranam Lake, one of the longest lakes in Tamil Nadu passes through Lalpet. Any breach of Veeranam during floods affects Lalpet. Around the city has much vegetation.

=== Climate ===
The temperature ranges from a maximum of 32.7 °C (90.9 °F) to a minimum of 24 °C (75 °F).in Winter maximum 29 °C (84 °F) or minimum 13 °C (55 °F). April to June are the Summer and December to January are the Winter. lalpet receives an average of 10 mm (0.39 in) annually, which is lesser than the state average of 1,008 mm (39.7 in). The Southwest monsoon, with an onset in June and lasting up to August, brings scanty rainfall. The bulk of the rainfall is received during the North-East monsoon in the months of October, November and December. The average number of rainy days ranges from 35-40 every year.[9][10]

== Economy ==
=== Agriculture ===
The major and traditional agriculture is Paan and other major harvesting is rice, banana, tomato and sugarcane.

== Demographics ==
=== Language ===
The official languages of Lalpet are Tamil (99%), English is used as a second language and also in common usage as an official language of India.French (2%). French is the adopted language by Lalpet people who has French influence and nationality. Arabic is an ancestor's language which came to lalpet earlier from Arabia and they start to speak Tamil while forward generations gradually stopped speaking in Arabic and Tamil become mother tongue. Arabic is teaching by Arabic college "Jamia Manba'ul Anwar" in Lalpet. Minority language includes Urdu (5.51 per cent as of 2012); at the 2011 census, Tamil was spoken as the first language by 87 per cent of the population followed by Arabic by 12.8 per cent. With a high-school education would generally be bilingual — speaking their own native language, in addition to Arabic & English, with varying fluency.

=== Religion ===
98% Islam, 1% Christians and 1.% Hindus

Lal Khan built the biggest mosque in Lalpet, named ' Lalkhan Jamia Masjid'.

=== Areas around Lalpet ===
Maniyam Adur, Kollumedu, Elleri, Kollimalai melpathi, Kollimalai Kilpathi, Kangiruppu, Kaikatti, Nathamalai, J.H.Nagar, Vadakkukulakudi, Koli theru.

=== Neighborhood towns and villages ===
KattumannarKoil, Maniyam Adur, Kollumedu, Elleri, Nedunjeri, Ayangudi and nathamalai.

=== Distance to cities from lalpet ===
CHENNAI: Distance: 232.5 km / 144.5 Mi Time: 3 hours 50 mins. PONDICHERRY: Distance: 90 km / 56 Mi Time: 1.30 mins. KUMBAKONAM: Distance: 49.7 km / 30.9 Mi Time: 75 mins. CHIDAMBARAM: Distance: 20 km / 13 Mi Time: 25 mins. ADIRAMPATTINAM: Distance: 124 km / 70 Mi Time: 3 hours. KILAKARAI: Distance: 273 km / 170.56 Mi Time: 5 hours 5 mins. KAYALPATNAM: Distance: 428 km / 220 Mi Time: 6hours 33 mins. CUDDALORE: Distance: 66 km / 16 Mi Time: 1hour 18 mins. PARANGIPETTAI: Distance: 40 km / 10 Mi Time: 48 mins. TRICHY: Distance: 128 km / 50 Mi Time: 2hours 19 mins.

=== Nearby tourist places ===
1. Pichavaram - 37 km North East of Lalpet -2-3-5 hour boat rides through ManGroves,

2. GangaiKonda Cholapuram - 20 km South West,

3. JayamKonda Cholapuram - 30 km South West,

4. SriMushnam - Artistic Temple - 20 km West of Lalpet,

5. Coloroon Bridge at Meensuruti - 10 km South

6. Pondicherry - auroville.

== Culture ==
Lalpet is Islamic and Arabian influenced town. Alcoholic beverages are prohibited as are pork products. The culture is mostly similar with Arabian culture.

=== Religious festivals ===
Lalpet is famous for religious festivals. Muslims unique functions Eid-ul Fitr and Eid-ul Alha are well celebrated by the people of Lalpet.Eid Al-Fitr, Ramadan and Eid Al-Adha. Eid Al-Fitr is celebrated at the end of Ramadan (a month of fasting), and Muslims usually give zakat (charity) on the occasion. Eid Al-Adha is celebrated at the end of Hajj (annual pilgrimage to Mecca), which is one of the five pillars, and Muslims usually sacrifice an animal and distribute its meat among family, friends and the poor. All Islamic holidays follow the lunar calendar, and thus move each year relative to the solar calendar. The Islamic calendar has 12 months and 354 days on a regular year, and 355 days on a leap year.
