= Veerattikuppam =

- Village
- Nickname: VKM
- Location in Tamil Nadu, India Veerattikuppam (India)
- Coordinates: 11.59°N 79.40°E
- Country: India
- State: Tamil Nadu
- District: Cuddalore
- Taluk: Virudhachalam
- Elevation: 45 m (148 ft)

Population (2011)
  - Total: 3,500(approx)

Languages
  - Official: Tamil
- Time zone: UTC+5:30 (IST)
- PIN: 607804
- Vehicle registration: TN-91(TN-31 till Jun17,2015)

Veerattikuppam is a village in Virudhachalam taluk, Cuddalore district, Tamil Nadu, India. It is located 12 kilometres (7.5 mi) from Virudhachalam and 5 kilometres (3.1 mi) from Neyveli. This village is covered by cashew groves a lot and also famous for cashew nuts & Jack fruits. It is one of the smallest village in cuddalore district.

The literacy rate of Veerattikuppam keeps on increasing every year which is the sign of development. Its cricket team is one of best team in around area.

In this village only the goddess Sri viswanathar Sivan temple and St muthumariamman Temple were together which is a uniqueness of the temple.

== Geography ==
Veerattikuppam is located at 11.59°N 79.40°E. It has an average elevation of 45 m (148 ft). The village is well connected by road to nearby towns. Buses to Virudhachalam are available frequently. The nearest railway station is Virudhachalam Junction.

== Climate ==
The climate is cool and too hot, rainy during September–November. Temperatures during the summer reach a maximum of 39 and a minimum of 22 degrees Celsius. Winter temperatures are between 30 and 17 degrees Celsius.

== Education ==
This village hosts a PUES School, which is the primitive school in the locality. PRM Government Higher Secondary School, Mudhanai is located 3 km from this village.

The school has created many officers and IT professionals.
