= Kachirayanatham =

Coordinates: 11.579706°N 79.362044°E

Kachirayanatham is a village in the Indian state of Tamil Nadu. This village was originally ruled by a king called 'Kachirayan' leading to the naming of the village as Kachirayanatham. In this village around 2000 people are living.

The main cultivation of this village is cashew, jackfruit, mangos, nuts, and black grains. Since the place is very dry land, dry kind of cultivation is preferred, and fruits and cashew nuts are snacks and sources of vitamins, minerals, fats and oils, and protein.
