= Uyyakondaravi =

Uyyakondaravi (or Uyyakondan Ravi) is a village near Neyveli, in Cuddalore district, Tamil Nadu state, India.

The village has a population of c. 500.
