= Tanur-e Boland =

Tanur-e Boland تنوربلند
- Village
- Location within Iran
- Coordinates: 32°49′07″N 48°30′33″E
- Country: Iran
- Province: Khuzestan
- County: Andimeshk
- Bakhsh: Alvar-e Garmsiri
- Rural District: Mazu

Population (2006)
  - Total: 217
- Time zone: UTC+3:30 (IRST)
  - Summer (DST): UTC+4:30 (IRDT)

Tanur-e Boland (Persian: تنوربلند, also Romanized as Tanūr-e Boland and Tanūr Boland) is a village in Mazu Rural District, Alvar-e Garmsiri District, Andimeshk County, Khuzestan Province, Iran. At the 2006 census, its population was 217, in 47 families.
