= Kurinjipadi =

- Town Panchayat
- Location in Tamil Nadu, India
- Coordinates: 11.57°N 79.60°E
- Country: India
- State: Tamil Nadu
- District: Cuddalore
- Region: Chola Nadu
- Elevation: 21 m (69 ft)

Population (2001)
  - Total: 23,159

Languages
  - Official: Tamil
- Time zone: UTC+5:30 (IST)
- PIN: 607302
- Vehicle registration: TN31

Kurinjipadi (also spelt as Kurinjippadi) is a Selection Grade Town Panchayat and taluk in Cuddalore district in the India, state of Tamil Nadu. It is known for its handloom industry, which has been producing and exporting handloom products since the 18th century.

== Geography ==
Kurinjipadi is located at 11.57°N 79.60°E. It has an average elevation of 21 m (69 ft).

== Demography and politics ==
As of 2001 India census, Kurinjipadi had a population of 23,159. Males constitute 51% of the population and females 49%. Kurinjipadi has an average literacy rate of 66%, higher than the national average of 59.5%: male literacy is 74%, and female literacy is 58%. In Kurinjipadi, 12% of the population is under 6 years of age. Kurinjipadi assembly constituency is part of Cuddalore (Lok Sabha constituency).

== Economy ==
Kurinjipadi one of the 13 hand loom clusters in India famous for hand loom products since the 18th century. The hand loom lungies are exported to Singapore, Malaysia, Sri Lanka, Gulf countries and other East Asian nations. It is strategically located close to Chidambaram, Cuddalore, Panruti, Neyveli, Vadalur and Virudhachalam. The dairy products and crops from this region are of good quality. The major crops are Paddy, Sugarcane and Groundnut. Saravana Global Energy Ltd is major employment source. Agriculture and Handloom are major source of income. It is still not satisfied in industrial opportunities. A special economic Zone is necessary for development in economical means. It is also a newly divided taluk.

== Landmarks ==
The Shri Subraya Swamigal shrine has its own significance for the antique idols made from the 18th century to the 20th century.

The ruins of Venugopalaswami temple at Vengadampet or Vengadampatti, which is almost 500 years old, is an exemplary red brick architecture built by Rani Vengattammal. Pondicherry Chief Dubash Anandharangapillai's diary contains a reference about this temple and its connection with the Anglo-French war.

== Education ==
Schools in Kurinjipadi are Government Higher secondary school, S.K.Velayutham Higher Secondary School (Govt Aided), Sri Gayathri Matriculation School, St. Paul Matriculation Higher Secondary school, S.K.V.T Matriculation school, Arunachala matriculation higher secondary school, Sri Ram matriculation higher secondary school etc. Colleges are S.K.V Women's Arts and Science College and Thiruvalluvar Arts and Science College. In 1999 a teacher training college (Om Muruga teacher training institute) has been set up. Several Computer education and Information Technology training institutes have come up in the region.
