= Veppur block =

Block in Perambalur district, Tamil Nadu, India

Veppur is a block in the Perambalur district of Tamil Nadu, India. There are a total of 33 villages in Veppur block in Kunnam Taluk.

== Details ==
Veppur is one of the blocks in Perambalur district where a crèche is opened for the children of working women. This crèche is funded by the Central and State Governments under the Integrated Child Development Scheme.

== Places of interest ==
Veppur has one of its famous Mariamman temples located in South Street (Old Colony), where there is a festival every year in the Tamil month of Chithirai (April). The festival is conducted for 10 days, making it one of the longest festivals in the area. People, especially women, come here and pray over various problems. Goats and hens are sacrificed here by different classes of people after they feel their problem-solving prayers have been answered.
