= Bhuvanagiri, Tamil Nadu =

Bhuvanagiri
- Taluka
- Location in Tamil Nadu, India Bhuvanagiri (India)
- Coordinates: 11.4471°N 79.6569°E
- Country: India
- State: Tamil Nadu
- District: Cuddalore
- Elevation: 11 m (36 ft)

Population (2006)
  - Total: 20,656

Languages
  - Official: Tamil
- Time zone: UTC+5:30 (IST)
- Vehicle registration: TN-91( TN-31 till Jun17,2015)

Bhuvanagiri is a taluka in the Cuddalore district of the Indian state of Tamil Nadu. It is best known as the birthplace of the South Indian saint Raghavendra Tirtha.

The word Bhuvanagiri is a combination of Bhuvanam (meaning World) and Giri (meaning Mountain). Hence, the name Bhuvanagiri means "The place with a mountain."

== Geography ==
Bhuvanagiri is located at 11.47°N 79.63°E. It has an average elevation of 11 meters (36 feet). It is located seven kilometres (4.35 miles) away from the temple town, Chidambaram.

The River Vellar is the main source of water for irrigation and other purposes.

== Demographics ==
As of 2011 India census, Bhuvanagiri had a population of 21,956 with a 50-50 male and female ratio. Bhuvanagiri has an average literacy rate of 74.9%, lower than the national average of 80.9%; with male literacy of 80.5% and female literacy of 69.3%. 10.5% of the population is under 6 years of age.

== Politics ==
Bhuvanagiri, a legislative assembly constituency is part of Chidambaram (Lok Sabha constituency).

== Economy ==
Agriculture is the main occupation of more than three-quarters of the town's population. Rice is the most cultivated crop, followed by the black gram and green gram. These crops are cultivated in a type of land known in Tamil as NanSei (meaning wetland cultivation). Other minor crops like finger Millet (Ragi in Tamil), pearl millet (Kambu in Tamil), corn (Makkaa cholam in Tamil), Thoor dhal (Thuvaram parupu in Tamil), sesame seeds (Yel in Tamil) and red gram are also grown around this town. These sets of crops are cultivated in a type of land known in Tamil as PunSei.

The principal exports from Bhuvanagiri are silk and handloom cloths. It is also known for its Silk saris and Silk Textiles, which are referred to as "Bhuvanagiri Pattu".

== Transport ==
A road bridge over the River Vellaru in Bhuvanagiri, connects the roadway between Cuddalore and Chidambaram.

== Education ==
Bhuvanagiri has several educational centres. There are two gender-exclusive government higher secondary schools. There are also private higher secondary schools and nursery schools.

Kamarajar Polytechnic College and Annamalai University are located near Bhuvanagiri.
