= Periyakurichi =

- town
- Country: India
- State: Tamil Nadu
- District: Ariyalur

Population (2011)
  - Total: 3,533

Languages
  - Official: Tamil
- Time zone: UTC+5:30 (IST)
- PIN: 621719
- Vehicle registration: TN-61
- Nearest city: Ariyalur
- Sex ratio: 1068 ♂/♀
- Literacy: 72.35%

Periyakurichi is one of the Village panchayat in sendurai of Ariyalur district, Tamil Nadu, India.

== Demographics ==
As per constitution of India and Panchyati Raaj Act, Periyakurichi village is administrated by Sarpanch (Head of Village) who is elected representative of village

As per the 2011 census, Periyakurichi had a total population of 3533 with 1749 males and 1784 females.

== Economy ==
Agriculture is the only source of income in this village. This village is gifted with red sand. It consists of different varieties of crop including cashew, coconut, sugarcane, paddy, jack fruit, mango and various tropical fruit and vegetables

It has one lime mine site which covers more than 200 acres of land, where mining started around early 1990.

== Administration and politics ==
Periyakkurichy comes under the Kunnam State Assembly Constituency and it elects a member to the Tamil Nadu Legislative Assembly once every five years. The current Member of Legislative Assembly (MLA) of the constituency is S. S. Sivasankar from the DMK Party. Ariyalur is a part of the Chidambaram Lok Sabha constituency and elects a member to the Lok Sabha, the lower house of the Parliament of India, once every five years. The current Member of Parliament from the constituency is M. Chandrakasi from the ADMK party.

School: Periyakkurichy has one Government high school and one Government primary school.

Hospital : Nearest hospital is Ponparappi Government Hospital.
