= Vazhmangalam =

- village
- Country: India
- State: Tamil Nadu

Languages
  - Official: Tamil
- Time zone: UTC+5:30 (IST)
- Postal code: 609703

Vazhmangalam is a small village located on the border between Tamil Nadu and Puducherry in India. The nearest place in Puducherry is T. R. Pattinam.

In this village, some important temples are located namely Arulmigu Throubathi Amman Temple, Arulmigu Veeramaa Kaaliamman Temple, Arulmigu Mazhai Maariamman Temple and Arulmigu Kasi Viswanathar temple.

There are some festivals such as Mariamman Kovil, Thropathai Amman Kovil Theemidhi and Veerama Kaaliamman. Pooja happens every year. Here mostly the community of Sengunther are living in majority and they used to contribute money to the temples and actively take part in those great festivals which occur every year.
