= Valasakkadu =

- Village
- Country: India
- State: Tamil Nadu
- District: Thanjavur
- Taluk: Pattukkottai
- Post office: Tiruchitrambalam
- PIN: 614628

Valasakkadu is a village in Thanjavur district, Tamil Nadu, India. The village is part of the Peravurani legislative assembly constituency and the Thanjavur Parliamentary Constituency.

The main occupation of the people in Valasakkadu is farming, which included paddy farms, coconut farms and sugar cane farms.

== Temples ==
- Ayyanar Temple
- Ganesha Temple
- Mariamman Temple
- Kathavarayan Temple

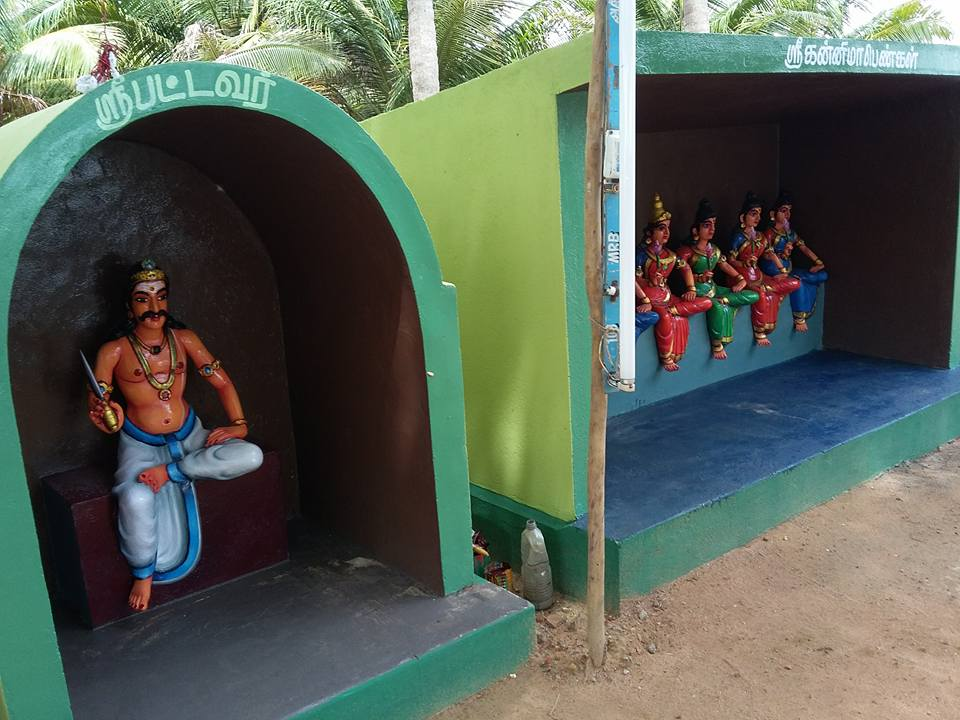
