= Kattumannarkoil =

Kattumannarkoil காட்டுமன்னார்கோயில்
- Municipality
- Location in Tamil Nadu, India
- Coordinates: 11.2727°N 79.5555°E
- Country: India
- State: Tamil Nadu
- District: Cuddalore

Government
  - Type: Panchayat Union
  - Body: Kattumannarkoil block

Population (2011)
  - Total: 22,683

Languages
  - Official: Tamil
- Time zone: UTC+5:30 (IST)
- PIN: 608301
- Telephone code: 04144
- Vehicle registration: TN-91( TN-31 till Jun17,2015)
- Website: http://cuddalore.tn.nic.in/ https://kattumannarkoil.com/

Kattumannarkoil is a municipality town and taluk headquarters in Cuddalore district of the Indian state of Tamil Nadu. The Kattumannarkoil Town Panchayat was constituted in 1892 and falls under the administrative jurisdiction of Cuddalore District. The town covers an area of 19.425 km^{2}. The town lies on the Chidambaram–Coimbatore Highway, 25 km southwest of Chidambaram, 25 km east of Srimushnam and 25 km northeast of Gangaikonda Cholapuram. The town is the birthplace of the Sri Vaishnava theologians (Acharya) Nathamuni and Yamunacharya.

== Demographics ==
As of the 2001 Indian census, Kattumannarkoil had a population of 22,683. Males constituted 51% of the population, and females 49%. The town had an average literacy rate of 76%, higher than the national average of 59.5%; male literacy was 82%, and female literacy was 71%. Children under six years of age made up 11% of the population.

== Climate ==
Like most of coastal Tamil Nadu, the area surrounding the Veeranam Tank has a subtropical climate, receiving most of its rainfall during the northeast monsoon from October to December. Hot weather prevails during the summer months from March to June, with maximum temperatures ranging from 30 to 38 °C (86 to 100 °F). Due to its proximity to the coast, cyclones frequently bring heavy rainfall to the area. Two rainfall monitoring stations operate along the Veeranam Tank: one on the right bank at Kattumannarkoil, and another on the left bank at Sethiathope. Average annual rainfall recorded at these stations exceeds the Tamil Nadu state average of 950 mm. Over an eighteen-year period, the average annual rainfall at Kattumannarkoil was 1,025 mm, while Sethiathope recorded an annual average of 1,273 mm over twenty-five years. Due to variations in the northeast monsoon, the Veeranam Tank often relies on water released from the Mettur Dam.

== Veeranam Lake and water resources ==
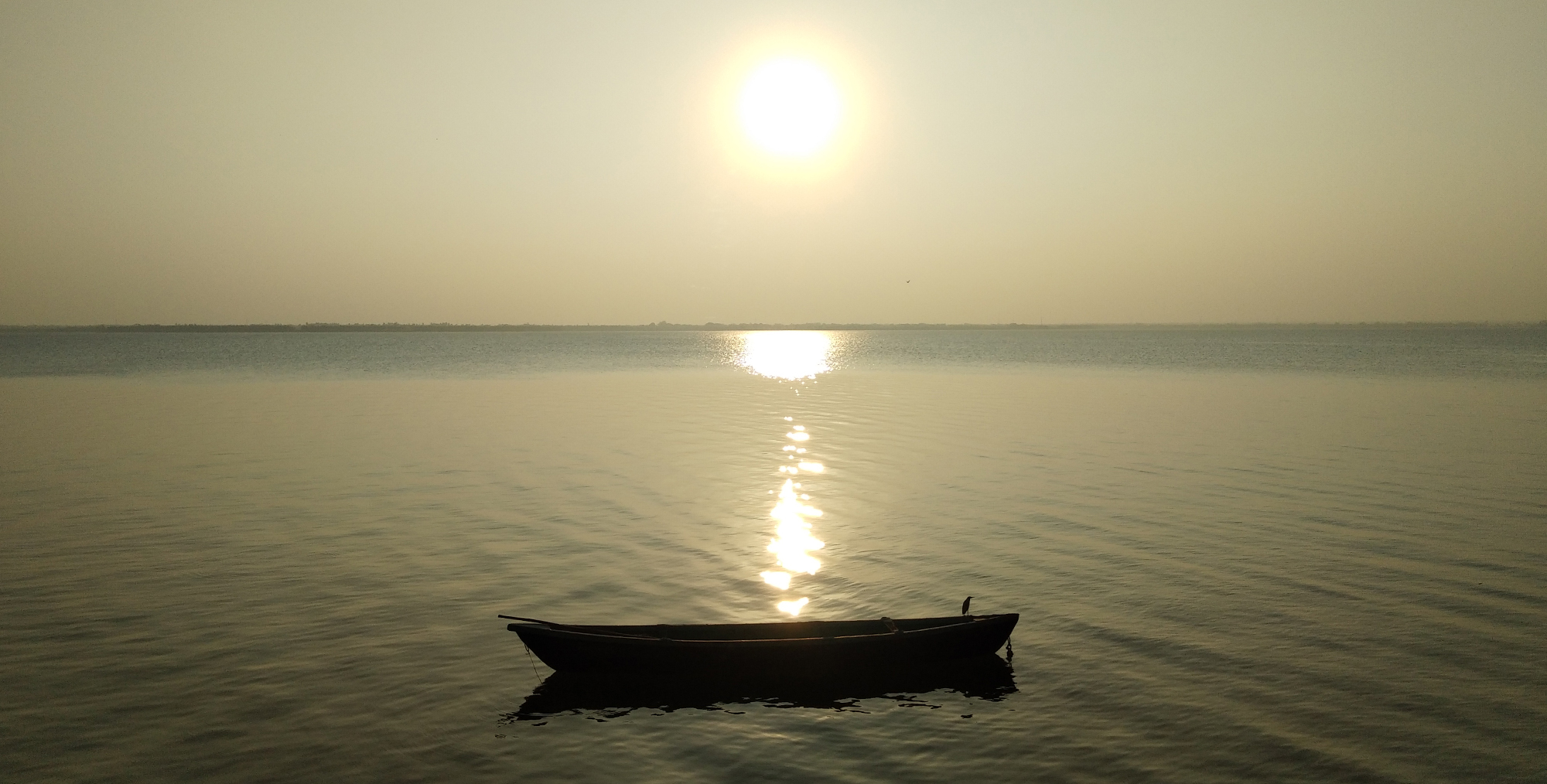

Veeranam Lake is a major reservoir in the Chidambaram Division of Cuddalore district. The Public Works Department (PWD) Lalpet Section oversees the maintenance and operation of its irrigation systems. The tank provides approximately 35% of the drinking water supply to the city of Chennai.

The reservoir is situated between latitudes 11°15′ N and 11°25′ N, and longitudes 79°30′ E and 79°35′ E.

One of the oldest and laergest reservoirs in Tamil Nadu, the tank features in 1950 historical novel Ponniyin Selvan by Kalki Krishnamurthy. According to historical records, the reservoir was constructed over a thousand years ago by Prince Rajaditya, son of the Chola king Parantaka I. It was originally named Veeranarayanan Tank.

During his reign in the tenth century (907–955 CE), king Parantaka I established the village of Veeranarayana Chaturvedimangalam as a gift to the Vedic scholars. This settlement, located on the right bank of the reservoir, is the present-day Kattumannarkoil. The king commissioned the construction of the reservoir, naming it Veeranarayanan Eri after his epithet Veeranarayanan (the heroic Narayana). Over time, the name evolved into Veeranam Tank.

During the reign of Rajendra Chola I (1012–1044 CE), following his northern campaign to the Ganges, he founded the capital Gangaikonda Cholapuram in 1024 CE. To support the irrigation around the new capital, he constructed a reservoir named Cholagangam (now known as Ponneri Tank near Jayankondam) and linked it to Veeranarayanan Eri so that surplus water would feed into it.

== Politics ==
The Kattumannarkoil panchayat comprises 55 villages, while the town panchayat consists of 18 wards. The Kattumannarkoil Assembly constituency, which is reserved for Scheduled Castes (SC), forms a part of the Chidambaram Lok Sabha constituency. The constituency is represented in the Tamil Nadu Legislative Assembly by Sinthanai Selvan of the Viduthalai Chiruthaigal Katchi (VCK).

== Villages ==
- Kuppupillai chavadi
- Palanchanallur
