= Nellikuppam =

Nellikuppam Nelli
- Town
- Nickname: NPM
- Location in Tamil Nadu, India
- Coordinates: 11.7667°N 79.6833°E
- Country: India
- State: Tamil Nadu
- District: Cuddalore

Government
  - Type: Second Grade Municipality
  - Body: Nellikuppam Municipality

Area
  - Total: 21.49 km^{2} (8.30 sq mi)

Population (2011)
  - Total: 46,679
  - Density: 2,172/km^{2} (5,626/sq mi)

Languages
  - Official: Tamil
- Time zone: UTC+5:30 (IST)
- PIN: 607105

Nellikuppam is a town and a municipality in Cuddalore city Corporation in the Indian state of Tamil Nadu. As of 2011, the town had a population of 46,678.

== Demographics ==
According to 2011 census, Nellikuppam had a population of 46,678 with a sex-ratio of 1,028 females for every 1,000 males, much above the national average of 929. A total of 5,072 were under the age of six, constituting 2,580 males and 2,492 females. Scheduled Castes and Scheduled Tribes accounted for 36.05% and 0.07% of the population respectively. The average literacy of the town was 73.83%, compared to the national average of 72.99%. The town had a total of 10,763 households. There were a total of 15,939 workers, comprising 469 cultivators, 3,307 main agricultural labourers, 220 in house hold industries, 9,360 other workers, 2,583 marginal workers, 32 marginal cultivators, 1,402 marginal agricultural labourers, 69 marginal workers in household industries and 1,080 other marginal workers.

== Politics ==
Nellikuppam of Cuddalore (Lok Sabha constituency).

As per latest restructuring of constituency by the Election Commission, Nellikuppam has been merged with Panruti legislative assembly.
