= Veeranam Lake =

Man-made lake in Tamil Nadu, India

- வீராணம் ஏரி (Tamil)
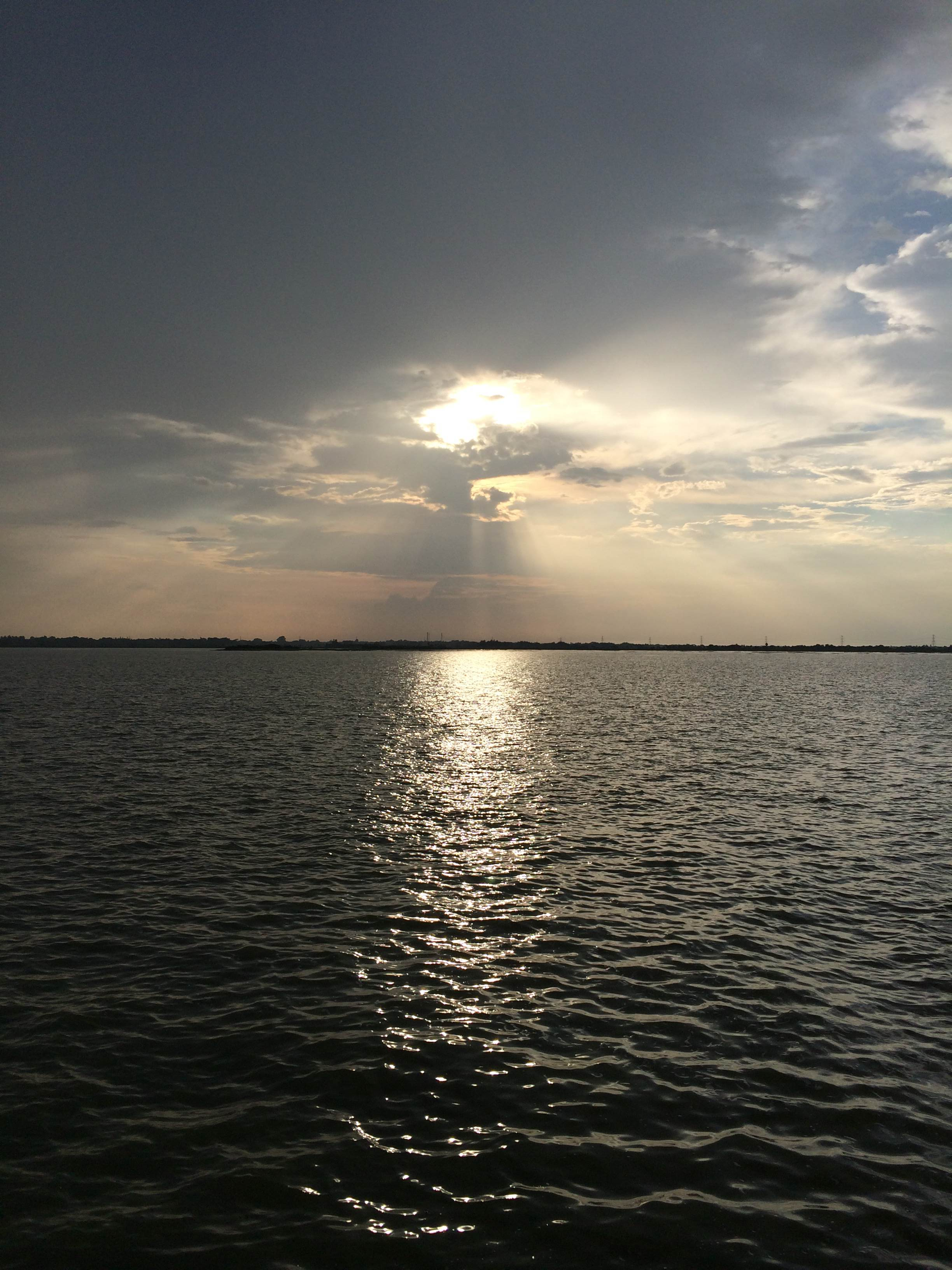
- Lake Veeranam

- Location within Tamil Nadu
- Location: Kattumannarkoil, Cuddalore district, Tamil Nadu, South India
- Coordinates: 11°20′10″N 79°32′40″E
- Lake type: reservoir, intermittent
- Primary inflows: vadavaru
- Catchment area: 25 km^{2} (9.7 sq mi)
- Basin countries: India
- Max. length: 11.2 km (7.0 mi)
- Max. width: 4 km (2.5 mi)
- Max. depth: 14.5 m (48 ft)
- Settlements: Kattumannarkoil

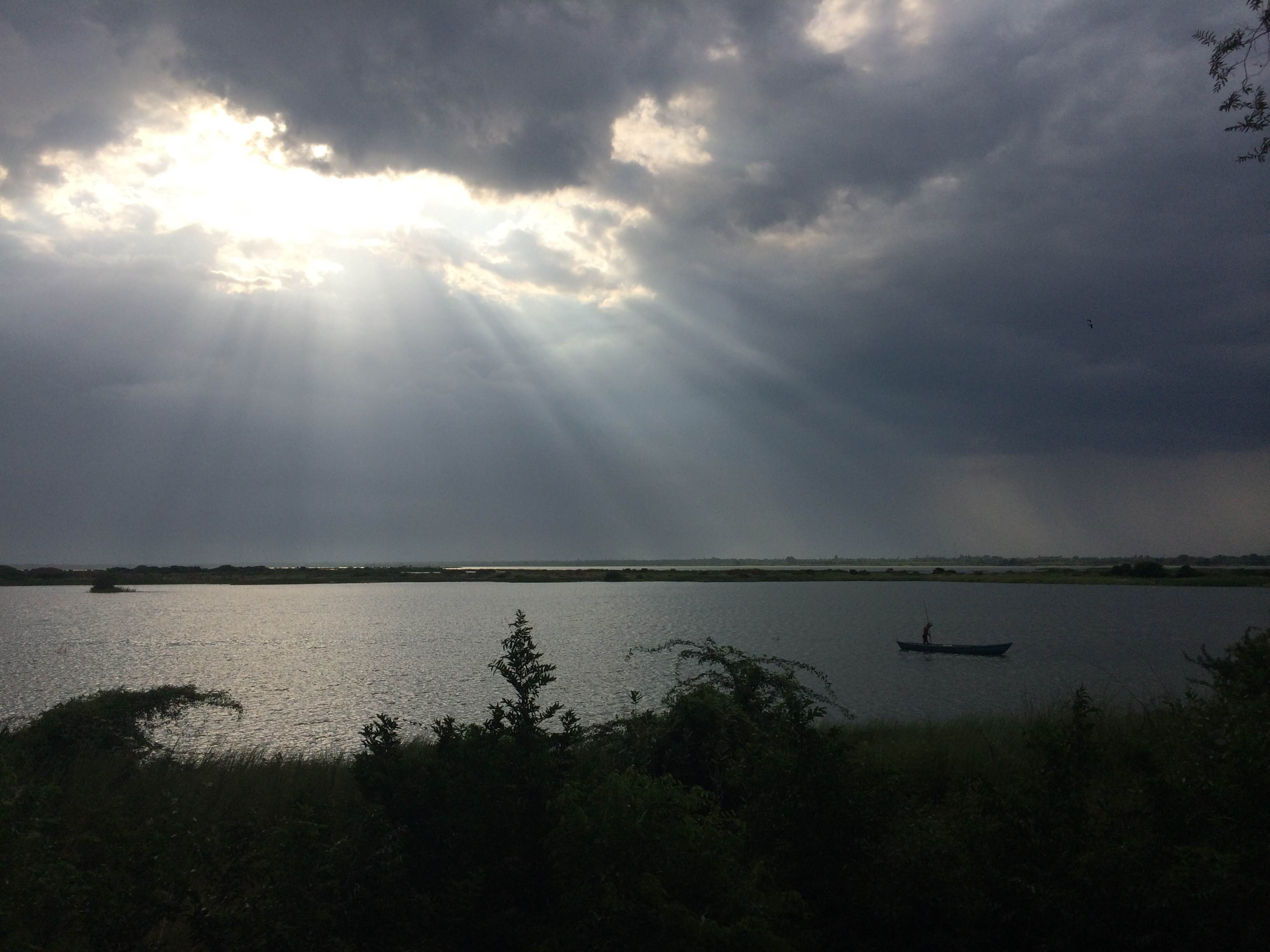
Veeranam Lake

Veeranarayanapuram Lake, also known as Veeranam Lake is located 14 km (8.7 mi) SSW in Cuddalore district in the state of Tamil Nadu in South India 1 km (0.62 mi) from Kattumannarkoil. It is located 235 km (146 mi) from Chennai, India. It is one of the reservoirs that supplies water to Chennai city. The lake has a capacity to store about 1,465 mcft of water (1.46 TMC). Though the level in the Veeranam lake has dipped to 323 million cubic feet (mcft), the same amount of 180 mld (million litres a day) was being drawn for supply to Chennai City.

== History ==
Veeranam Lake was built in the 10th century during the time of Greater Cholas (907–955 CE) and is a 16-kilometre (9.9 mi) long dam in northern Tamil Nadu. It was built by Rajaditya Chola with his soldiers during leisure times, when they had camped at Thirumunaipadi for a war against Pallava kings. He named it after the Vishnu temple located near by and it was also his father's Parantaka I's title name "Veeranarayanan". The lake was originally named as Veeranarayana Mangalam lake, and was about 20 km long and 7 km wide then.

The lake gets water from Kollidam via Vadavaru River. The lake remains dry for the major part of the year. Water released from the Mettur dam through Kollidam and Lower Anicut would also bring in sufficient inflow into the Veeranam Lake. The lake received sufficient inflow in April enabling supply to the city for three months. With heavy rain in Western Ghats, the lake almost got its storage capacity as it received inflow from the Cauvery tributaries of Bhavani and Amaravathi.

== The Veeranam Project ==
The Veeranam project, to supply water to Chennai, was conceived in 1967 by the then Chief Minister of Tamil Nadu, C. N. Annadurai, and executed under his successor, M. Karunanidhi. The project's completion in 2004 by the then Chief Minister of Tamil Nadu, J. Jayalalithaa. It was impossible to use any water from the lake since it had run dry, and the face-saving proposal adopted by the authorities was to dig 45 deep borewells around the area and pump the resulting water 235 km (146 mi) to Chennai via the pipeline. The length of the lake is 14 km and this may have been the largest lake in Tamil Nadu until the building of the Bhavanisagar Dam in 1955. The credit goes to ancient people who have done this job with ordinary hand made tools.

== In literature ==
The opening chapter of the book Ponniyin Selvan is set on the banks of the Veera Narayana Lake. Kalki Krishnamurthy gives an elaborate description of the features of the lake and the way multiple rivers flow into the lake. Kalki added Chola princess Kundavi used to come for refreshment at the banks of Veeranam lake during spring season. He also makes a reference to the fact, that Ramanujacharya decided on the number of 74 Peetas - 74 simhasanathipathigal based on the number of 74 openings in the lake.
