= Vadalur =

- Municipality
- Location in Tamil Nadu, India
- Coordinates: 11.5552°N 79.5551°E
- Country: India
- State: Tamil Nadu
- District: Cuddalore
- Taluk: Kurijipadi

Government
  - Type: 2nd-Grade Municipality
  - Body: Vadalur Municipality

Area
  - Land: 19.93 km^{2} (7.70 sq mi)

Population (2011)
  - Total: 39,514
  - Density: 1,983/km^{2} (5,135/sq mi)
  - Rank: 397

Languages
  - Official Language: Tamil
- Time zone: UTC+5:30 (IST)
- Postal code: 607303
- Area code: 04142
- ISO 3166 code: ISO 3166-2:IN
- Vehicle registration: TN-31, TN-91
- Website: https://www.tnurbantree.tn.gov.in/vadalur/

Vadalur is a 2nd-grade municipality in Cuddalore district, Tamil Nadu. It is 208 km (129 mi) from Chennai, the state capital of Tamil Nadu.

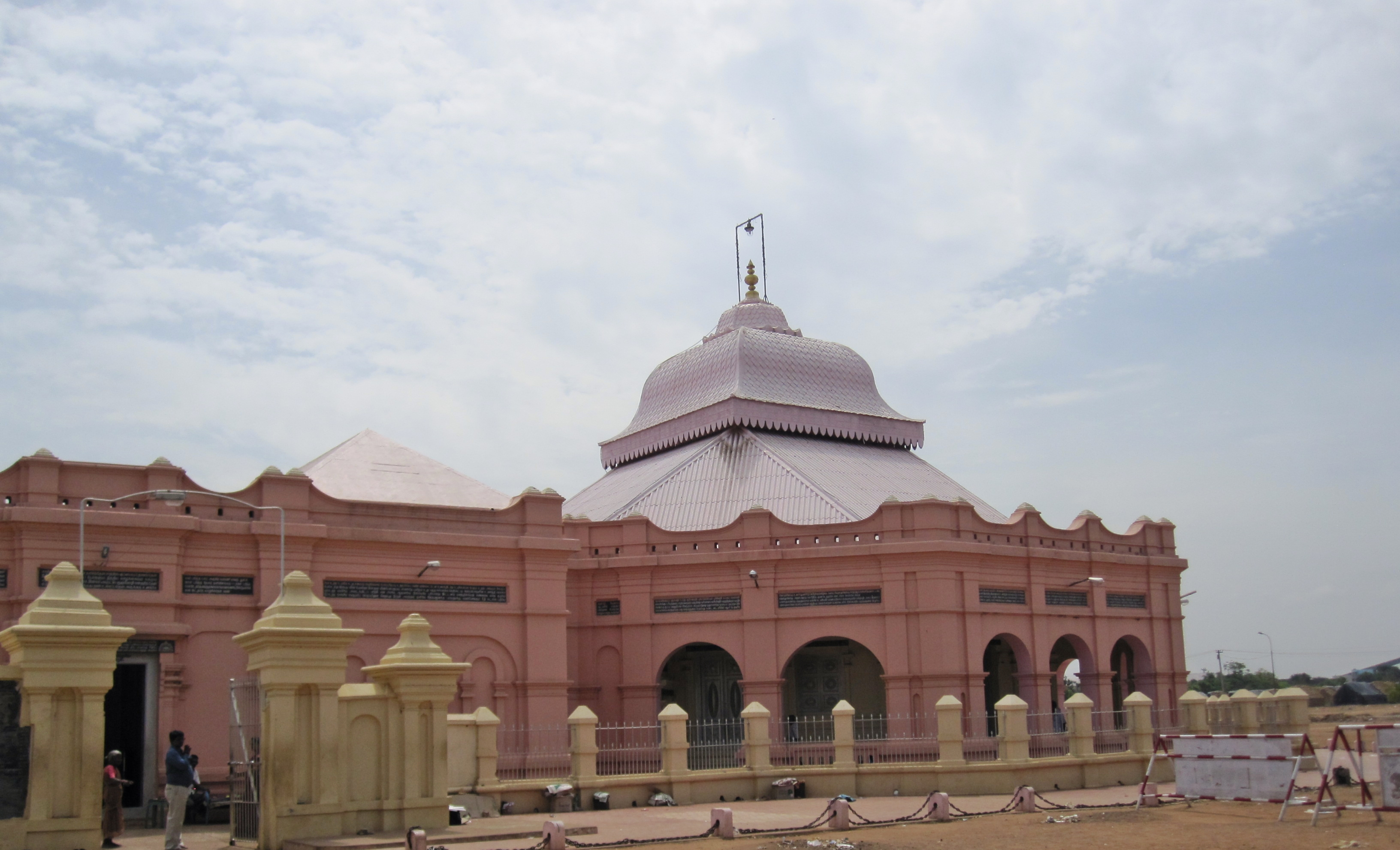
Sathya Gnana Sabai

== History ==
Ramalinga Swamigal, often called Vallalar, established the Sathyagnana Sabhai. He built a temple which is open year-round. Thousands of visitors attend festivals and monthly puja dates at this temple. Vadalur is well connected by rail and road, and it provides transport to major cities like Trichy, Chennai, Tanjore, Puducherry, and Kumbakonam.

== Festivals ==
The Thai Poosam (Tamil: தைப்பூசம்) celebration in January is a festival held annually in Vadalur. The Swamigal sang thousands of songs called Thiru Arutppa. The district was named after him for a while. On Thai Poosam, thousands of devotees from all over Tamil Nadu visit the temple. More than 10,000 market stalls are available for at least a week for the pilgrims. Food, water, and fresh juice are available for devotees to purchase.

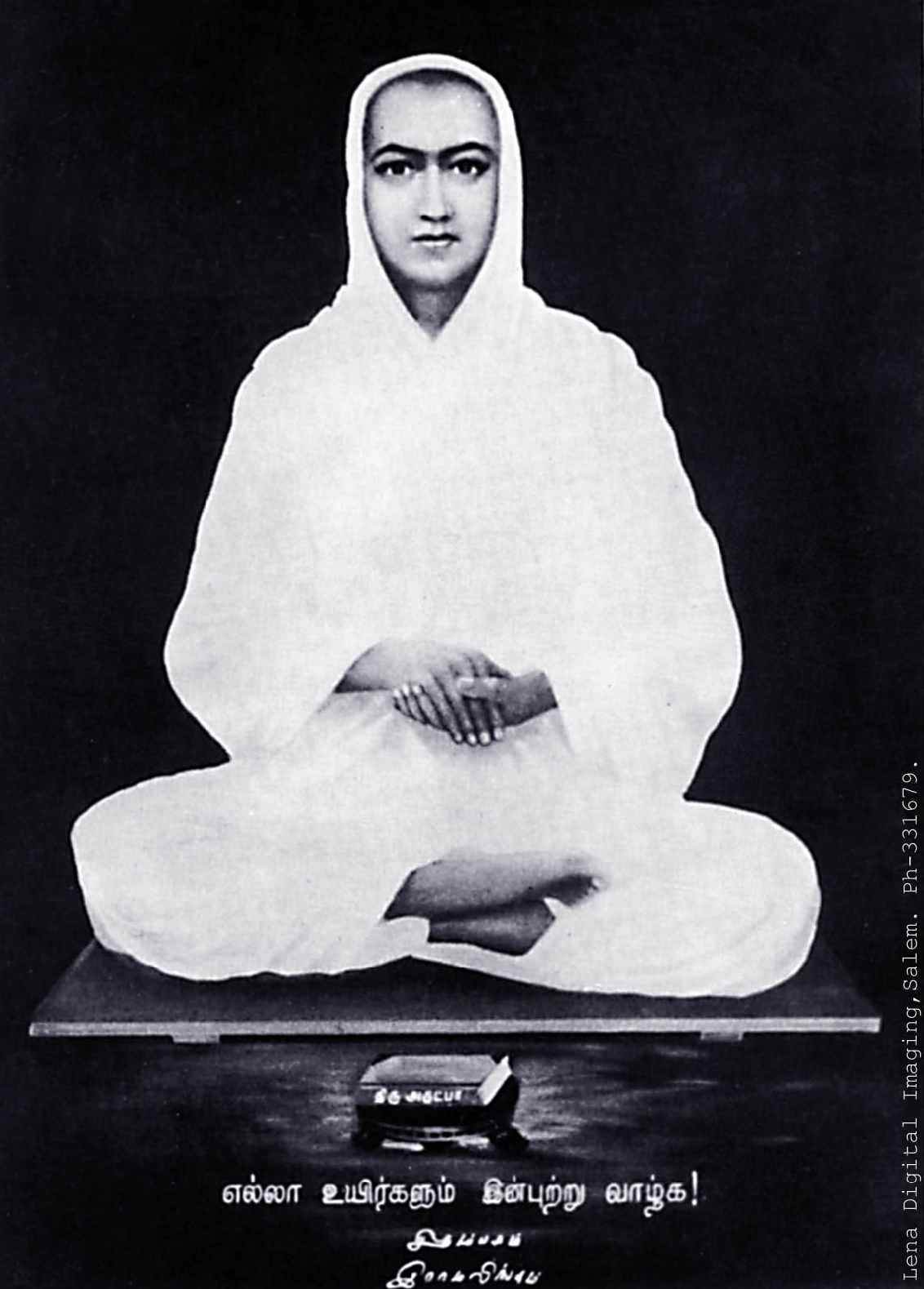
Vallalar

== Demographics ==
As of the 2011 census, Vadalur had a population of 39,514. Males constitute 51% of the population and females 49%. Vadalur has an average literacy rate of 70%, higher than the national average of 59.5%. The male literacy rate is 78%, and the female literacy rate is 61%. In Vadalur, 11% of the population is under six years of age. The literacy level is high because of the private schools and government schools.

Vadalur runs a ceramic factory called Neycer which employs many people in the city.

== Revenue villages ==
- Serakuppam
- Abatharanapuram
- Parvathipuram

== Economy ==
Agriculture plays an important role in Vadalur's economy. The SIDCO Industrial Estate creates many job opportunities for the people of Vadalur. NLC's coal loading station is located in Vadalur as well. Small businesses also help in improving Vadalur's economic development.

== Transportation ==
=== Train ===
- Vadalur Railway Station (VLU), located 1 km (0.62 mi) from the Vadalur Main Bus Terminal

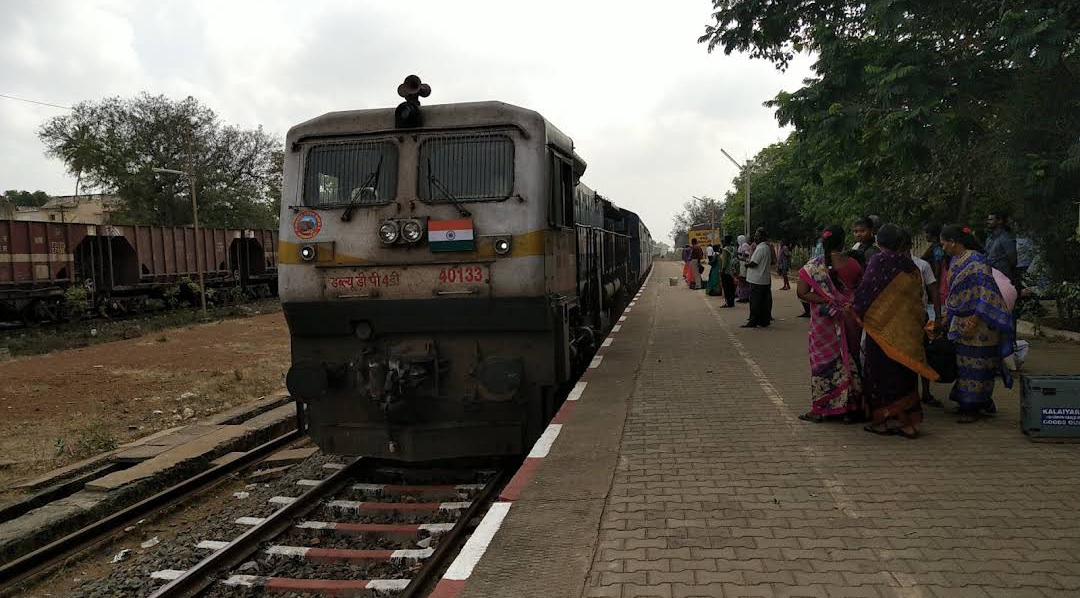
Vadalur Railway Station

==== Trains and timing ====
Train name	Arrival	Departure	Days	Current status
06121 Cuddalore Port Junction - Salem Junction DEMU (via Neyveli, Vridhachalam, Attur)	05:27	05:28	Runs daily	Active
06889 Tiruppadripuliyur - Tiruchirapalli DEMU (via Vadalur, Vridhalachalam Jn, Ariyalur, Srirangam)	06:41	06:42	Runs daily	Active
16530 Karaikkal - SMVT Bangalore Express (via Vadalur, Vridhalachalam, Attur, Salem, Dharmapuri, Hosur)	09:39	09:40	Runs daily	Active
16529 SMVT Bangalore - Karaikkal Express (via Vadalur, Cuddalore, Chidambaram, Sirkazhi, Mayiladuthurai, Thiruvarur, Nagapattinam, Nagore)	16:52	16:53	Runs daily	Active
06890 Tiruchirapalli - Tiruppadripuliyur DEMU (via Srirangam, Ariyalur, Vridhachalam Jn, Vadalur, Kurinjipadi)	19.35	19:36	Runs daily	Active
06122 Salem Junction - Cuddalore Port Junction DEMU (via Attur, Vridhachalam, Neyveli)	21:42	21:43	Runs daily	Active

=== Bus ===
Buses are available from Vadalur to major cities at all times.

- Vadalur - Chennai (TNSTC)
- Vadalur - Bangalore (TNSTC)
- Vadalur - Tirupati (TNSTC)
- Cuddalore - Trichy (TNSTC)
- Chennai - Kumbakonam (TNSTC & SETC)
- Chennai - Tanjore (TNSTC & SETC)
- Cuddalore - Salem (TNSTC)
- Chidambaram - Salem (TNSTC)
- Puducherry - Tiruchendur (SETC)
- Puducherry - Sengottai (SETC)
- Puducherry - Thiruvananthapuram (SETC)
- Puducherry - Ooty (SETC)
- Puducherry - Pampa (SETC Seasonal Route)
- Puducherry - Mahe (PRTC)
- Neyveli - Karaikkal (PRTC)
- Chidambaram - Vellore (TNSTC)
- Chidambaram - Gudiyatham (TNSTC)
- Chidambaram - Thiruvannamalai (TNSTC)
- Kumbakonam - Vellore (TNSTC)
- Cuddalore - Vridhalachalam (TNSTC)
- Cuddalore - Madurai (TNSTC)
- Cuddalore - Tiruppur (TNSTC)
- Cuddalore - Palani (TNSTC)
- Chidambaram - Tirupati (TNSTC)
- Chidambaram - Bangalore (KSRTC)
- Chidambaram - Bangalore (TNSTC)

=== Local transport ===
- Auto rickshaws are available anytime in Vadalur. The auto rickshaw stand is called Vallalar Auto Stand.

=== Nearby airports ===
- Tiruchirappalli International Airport (TRZ) - 157 km from Vadalur
- Pondicherry Domestic Airport (PNY) - 63 km from Vadalur
- Neyveli Domestic Airport (NVY) (Not in service) - 8.8 km from Vadalur

== Hospitals ==
- Government Upgraded Urban Primary Health Centre
- Government Veterinary Hospital, Vadalur

== Landmarks ==
Satya Gnana Sabha is a major tourist and spiritual center in Vadalur. Vadular is also home to Iyyan Lake and the Sacred Heart Church. The NLC mines can be seen from the observation site in the Kattukollai area of Vadalur.

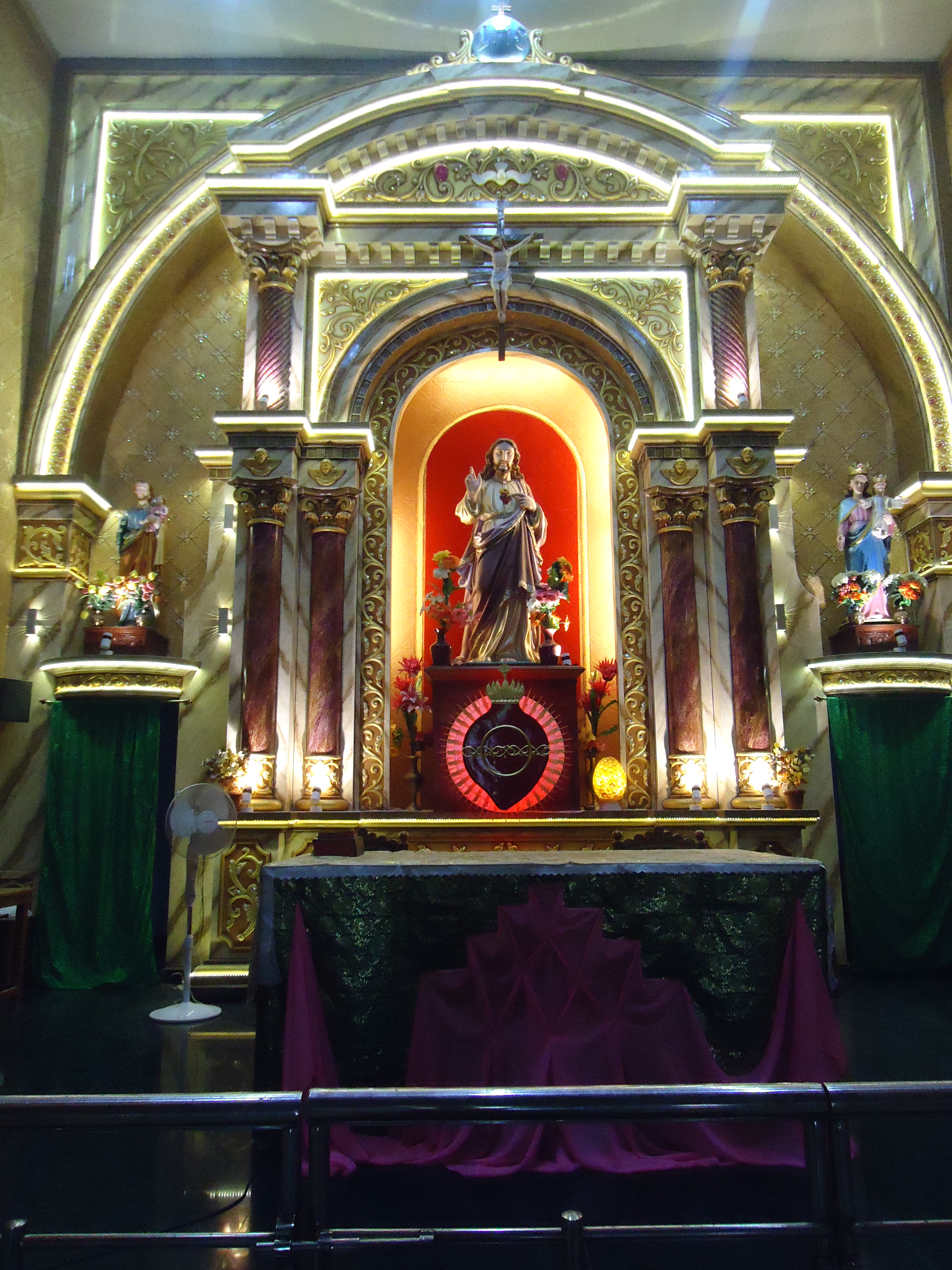
Sacred Heart Church, Vadalur

- A vegetable market is held near Vadalur bus stand every Saturday.
- Meat markets run daily in Raghavendra City.
- A farmers' market (Tamil: உழவர் சந்தை) is open daily in Raghavendra City.
- A cattle and goat market is held every Saturday on the grounds of Abatharanapuram.
- Sathya Ganana Sabai

== Areas in Vadalur ==
- Serakuppam
- Abatharanapuram
- Baktha nagar
- Parvathipuram
- Pudhunagar
- Kattukollai
- Kottakarai
- Poosalikuppam
- Vengattankuppam
- Neththanankuppam
- Ragavendra City
- Jayapriya Nagar
- NLC Officers Nagar
- R.C. Colony
- Thomaiyar Nagar

== Major cities from Vadalur ==
Chennai (the state capital) is located directly north of Vadalur. Trichy and Salem are located west of Vadalur. Cuddalore (District Capital) and Puducherry are to the east. Kumbakonam and Thanjavur is to the south.

== Notable people ==
- O. P. Ramaswamy Reddiyar, former chief minister of Tamil Nadu

== See also ==
- Satyagnana Sabha, Vadalur
- Ramalinga Swamigal
- Asalambigai Ammaiyar
