= List of villages in Vazhapadi taluk =

This is a list of villages in Vazhapadi taluk, one of the thirteen taluks of Salem district, in the Indian state of Tamil Nadu. The taluk was covered by the Ayothiapattinam and Valapady Community Development Blocks as of the 2011 census. Ayothiapattinam block covered the western part of the taluk, while Valapady block covered the eastern part.

== Revenue villages (2011) ==
List of villages in Vazhapadi taluk
| Name | MDDS Code | CD Block | Population (2011) | Land area (2011) | | Population density |
| Name | MDDS Code | CD Block | Population (2011) | km^{2} | sq mi | Population density |
|---|---|---|---|---|---|---|
| Aladipatti | 634167 | Ayothiapattinam | 1,296 | 4.5 | 1.7 | 288.0/km^{2} (745.9/sq mi) |
| Anuppur | 634175 | Ayothiapattinam | 3,385 | 8.9 | 3.4 | 380.3/km^{2} (985.1/sq mi) |
| Aranuthumalai | 634169 | Ayothiapattinam | 818 | 3.4 | 1.3 | 240.6/km^{2} (623.1/sq mi) |
| Athanurpatti | 634192 | Valapady | 4,363 | 2.3 | 0.89 | 1,897.0/km^{2} (4,913.1/sq mi) |
| Chandrapillaivalasai | 634188 | Valapady | 4,709 | 8.7 | 3.4 | 541.3/km^{2} (1,401.9/sq mi) |
| Chenrayapalayam | 634200 | Valapady | 1,439 | 1.7 | 0.66 | 846.5/km^{2} (2,192.3/sq mi) |
| Chinnakavundapuram | 634182 | Ayothiapattinam | 3,534 | 2.3 | 0.89 | 1,536.5/km^{2} (3,979.6/sq mi) |
| Chinnakuttimaduvu | 634160 | Valapady | 282 | 0.8 | 0.31 | 352.5/km^{2} (913.0/sq mi) |
| Chinnamanayakanpalayam | 634189 | Valapady | 4,384 | 6.2 | 2.4 | 707.1/km^{2} (1,831.4/sq mi) |
| Chinnavellampatti | 634165 | Ayothiapattinam | 266 | 1.7 | 0.66 | 156.5/km^{2} (405.3/sq mi) |
| Eripudur | 634178 | Ayothiapattinam | 1,806 | 4.3 | 1.7 | 420.0/km^{2} (1,087.8/sq mi) |
| Jambuthumalai | 634216 | Valapady | 221 | 1.6 | 0.62 | 138.1/km^{2} (357.7/sq mi) |
| Kankatti Ala | 634161 | Valapady | 639 | 2.8 | 1.1 | 228.2/km^{2} (591.1/sq mi) |
| Karipatti | 634183 | Ayothiapattinam | 4,937 | 5.4 | 2.1 | 914.3/km^{2} (2,367.9/sq mi) |
| Karumapuram Agrahara | 634184 | Ayothiapattinam | 2,329 | 5.8 | 2.2 | 401.6/km^{2} (1,040.0/sq mi) |
| Karungalpatti | 634214 | Valapady | 419 | 1.2 | 0.46 | 349.2/km^{2} (904.3/sq mi) |
| Kattuveppilaipatti | 634201 | Valapady | 4,297 | 6.9 | 2.7 | 622.8/km^{2} (1,612.9/sq mi) |
| Kavurkkalpatti | 634198 | Valapdy | 1,279 | 1 | 0.39 | 473.7/km^{2} (1,226.9/sq mi) |
| Kiraipatti | 634164 | Valapady | 282 | 1.5 | 0.58 | 188.0/km^{2} (486.9/sq mi) |
| Kolathukombai | 634174 | Valapady | 2,732 | 4.5 | 1.7 | 527.1/km^{2} (1,365.2/sq mi) |
| Komarapalayam | 634210 | Valapady | 1,052 | 1.1 | 0.42 | 956.4/km^{2} (2,477.0/sq mi) |
| Kullampatti | 634179 | Ayothiapattinam | 2,849 | 2.8 | 1.1 | 1,017.5/km^{2} (2,635.3/sq mi) |
| Kumarasamiyur | 634193 | Valapady | 525 | 1.4 | 0.54 | 375.0/km^{2} (971.2/sq mi) |
| Kurichi | 634190 | Valapady | 8,043 | 17.9 | 6.9 | 449.3/km^{2} (1,163.8/sq mi) |
| Kuttathipatti | 634176 | Ayothiapattinam | 4,490 | 5.1 | 2.0 | 880.4/km^{2} (2,280.2/sq mi) |
| Malaiyalapatti | 634215 | Valapady | 601 | 1.9 | 0.73 | 316.3/km^{2} (819.3/sq mi) |
| Mannarpalayam | 634207 | Valapady | 2,169 | 5.3 | 2.0 | 409.2/km^{2} (1,059.9/sq mi) |
| Mannayakanpatti | 634195 | Valapady | 2,201 | 3.5 | 1.4 | 628.9/km^{2} (1,628.7/sq mi) |
| Mettupatti | 634197 | Ayothiapattinam | 4,502 | 8.8 | 3.4 | 511.6/km^{2} (1,325.0/sq mi) |
| Mettur | 634205 | Valapady | 717 | 1.2 | 0.46 | 597.5/km^{2} (1,547.5/sq mi) |
| Minnampalli | 634180 | Ayothiapattinam | 9,327 | 7.6 | 2.9 | 1,227.2/km^{2} (3,178.5/sq mi) |
| M.Perumalpalayam | 634196 | Ayothiapattinam | 5,232 | 5.5 | 2.1 | 951.3/km^{2} (2,463.8/sq mi) |
| Muttampatti | 634202 | Valapady | 3,731 | 5.8 | 2.2 | 643.3/km^{2} (1,666.1/sq mi) |
| Nattaramangalam | 634185 | Ayothiapattinam | 4,437 | 2.7 | 1.0 | 1,643.3/km^{2} (4,256.2/sq mi) |
| Nirmullikuttai | 634187 | Valapady | 4,419 | 4.8 | 1.9 | 462.3/km^{2} (1,197.3/sq mi) |
| Palapatti | 634177 | Ayothiapattinam | 1,547 | 3.4 | 1.3 | 455.0/km^{2} (1,178.4/sq mi) |
| Palappadi | 634172 | Ayothiapattinam | 869 | 5.4 | 2.1 | 160.9/km^{2} (416.8/sq mi) |
| Pallikkadu | 634171 | Ayothiapattinam | 151 | 0.4 | 0.15 | 377.5/km^{2} (977.7/sq mi) |
| Periakuttimaduvu | 634159 | Valapady | 672 | 2.3 | 0.89 | 292.2/km^{2} (756.7/sq mi) |
| Periyakavundapuram | 634181 | Ayothiapattinam | 3,536 | 7.6 | 2.9 | 465.3/km^{2} (1,205.0/sq mi) |
| Periyavellampatti | 634166 | Ayothiapattinam | 294 | 0.9 | 0.35 | 326.7/km^{2} (846.1/sq mi) |
| Ponnarampatti | 634208 | Valapady | 2,092 | 14.2 | 5.5 | 147.3/km^{2} (381.6/sq mi) |
| Puludikkuttai | 634173 | Valapady | 1,175 | 3.7 | 1.4 | 317.6/km^{2} (822.5/sq mi) |
| Pungamaduvu | 634163 | Valapady | 748 | 2.6 | 1.0 | 287.7/km^{2} (745.1/sq mi) |
| Sandumalai | 634162 | Valapady | 118 | 0.2 | 0.077 | 590.0/km^{2} (1,528.1/sq mi) |
| Sarkar Nattamangalam | 634186 | Ayothiapattinam | 2,561 | 4.5 | 1.7 | 569.1/km^{2} (1,474.0/sq mi) |
| Singipuram | 634203 | Valapady | 6,868 | 12.6 | 4.9 | 545.1/km^{2} (1,411.7/sq mi) |
| Sirumalai | 634168 | Ayothiapattinam | 481 | 2.7 | 1.0 | 178.1/km^{2} (461.4/sq mi) |
| Somanpatti | 634204 | Valapady | 2,206 | 5.8 | 2.2 | 380.3/km^{2} (985.1/sq mi) |
| Tekkalpatti | 634213 | Valapady | 1,280 | 7.4 | 2.9 | 173.0/km^{2} (448.0/sq mi) |
| Tirumanur | 634212 | Valapady | 5,282 | 11.7 | 4.5 | 451.5/km^{2} (1,169.3/sq mi) |
| Tukkiyampalayam | 634194 | Valapady | 5,385 | 7.7 | 3.0 | 699.4/km^{2} (1,811.3/sq mi) |
| Velampatti | 634170 | Ayothiapattinam | 1,995 | 5.3 | 2.0 | 376.4/km^{2} (974.9/sq mi) |
| Vellalakundam | 634199 | Ayothiapattinam | 6,904 | 22.1 | 8.5 | 312.4/km^{2} (809.1/sq mi) |
| Veppilaipatti | 634211 | Valapady | 3,600 | 7.1 | 2.7 | 507.0/km^{2} (1,313.2/sq mi) |
| Veppilaipatti pudur | 634209 | Valapady | 961 | 2.3 | 0.89 | 417.8/km^{2} (1,082.2/sq mi) |
| Vettaikkaranur | 634191 | Valapady | 710 | 1.7 | 0.66 | 417.6/km^{2} (1,081.7/sq mi) |
| Vilaripalayam | 634206 | Valapady | 1,151 | 1.0 | 0.39 | 1,151.0/km^{2} (2,981.1/sq mi) |

== Other villages ==
- Thamayanoor
