= Mangalur block =

Revenue block of Cuddalore district of the Indian state of Tamil Nadu

Mangalur block is a revenue block of Cuddalore district of the Indian state of Tamil Nadu. This revenue block consist of 67 panchayat villages. It is the biggest block in Cuddalore district. this is second largest block in Tamilnadu

== List of Panchayat Villages ==
SI.No	Panchayat Village
1	Adari
2	Akkanur
3	Alambadi
4	Alathur
5	Arangur
6	Arasankudi
7	Avatti
8	Avinangudi
9	Chitheri
10	E.Keeranur
11	Edacheruvai
12	Ezhuthur
13	Ivanur
14	Ja.Endal
15	Kachirankulam
16	Kallur
17	Kandamathan
18	Kazhudur
19	Keelacheruvai
20	Kilakalpoondi
21	Keelorathur
22	Kodangudi
23	Korakkai
24	Korakkavadi
25	Lakkur
26	Ma.Kothanur
27	Ma.Podaiyur
28	Ma.Puthur
29	Malayanoor
30	Mangalur
31	Mangulam
32	Melakalpoondi
33	Melathanur
34	Navalur
35	Nedungulam
36	Nithinatham
37	Orangur
38	Panayandur
39	Passar
40	Pattakurichi
41	Pattur
42	Perumulai
43	Pothiramangalam
44	Poyyanapadi
45	Pulikarambalur
46	Pulivalam
47	Pullur
48	Ramanatham
49	Rettakurichi
50	S.Naraiyur
51	S.Pudur
52	Sevveri
53	Sirukarambalur
54	Sirumulai
55	Sirupakkam
56	T.Endal
57	Thatchur
58	Thondankurichi
59	Thozhudur
60	Tittakudi
61	Vadakarampoondi
62	Vadapathy
63	Vagaiyur
64	Vaiyangudi
65	Vallimaduram
66	Venganur
67	Vinayaganandal
