= Valapady block =

Valapady block is a revenue block of Salem district of the Indian state of Tamil Nadu. This revenue block consists of 20 panchayat villages. They are as follows:

1. Athanurpatti
2. Kattuveppilaipatti
3. Kurichi
4. Muthampatti
5. Puzhuthikuttai
6. Thekkalpatti
7. Veppilaipatti
8. Chandrapillaivalasu
9. Kolathukombai
10. Mannaickenpatti
11. Neermullikuttai
12. Singapuram
13. Tirumanur
14. Vilaripalayam
15. Chinnamanaickenpalayam
16. Komarapalayam
17. Mannarpalayam
18. Ponnarampatti
19. Somampatti
20. Tukkiyampalayam
