= Ramanatham =

Ramanatham Ramanatham Ramanatham
- Panchayat
- Location in Tamil Nadu, India Ramanatham (India)
- Coordinates: 11.40686°N 79.00658°E
- Country: India
- State: Tamil Nadu
- District: Cuddalore

Government
  - Village Panchayat Vice President: P.Muthu – Ramanatham;

Languages
  - Official: Tamil
- Time zone: UTC+5:30 (IST)
- PIN: 606303
- Telephone code: 04143
- Vehicle registration: TN 91
- Nearest Town: Perambalur, Trichy, Cuddalore
- Lok Sabha constituency: Cuddalore
- State Legislative constituency: Tittagudi

Ramanatham and Tholudur or Thozhudur, (meaning "Distant Village"), are twin towns by the Vellar River in Cuddalore District, Tamil Nadu, India.

Ramanatham has schools and a post office. There are also private schools and colleges. All major hotels, banks, shopping center, bus stands, marriage halls, petrol/diesel/gas stations are located on Ramanatham highway, as Tholudur is popularly known for its traditional house.

People often refer Ramanatham bus stand as Tholudur stop – however, Tholudur is 1.5 km away from this Ramanatham highway bus stop. This is due to British rule as during their time they referred to this place as Tholudur instead of Ramanatham. For locals it is a twin town.

The main occupation of the people is agriculture. Rice, sugarcane, groundnut, sweet corn and other cereals are cultivated. Cricket, Kabbadi and badminton have been popular for decades.

The higher secondary school boasts a variety of trees. Nearby is a Chivan (Sivan) temple with inscriptions of the Chola dynasty.

== Location ==
Ramanatham – Tholudur towns are located on the banks of Vellar River. Ramanatham is situated on NH 45 the highway connecting the state capital Chennai and Trichy cities – Tholudur is 1.5 km from Ramanatham main road. Also, it is 15 km far from the nearest town panchayat, Tittakudi, which is also its Taluk. Ramanatham – Tholudur is 246 km away from Chennai and 76 km away from Trichy.

== Ramanatham ==
1. Aadhar Card Center
2. Vishan computer education and tech
3. VAO Office
4. Vellar River Dam (to separate the water to Wellington Lake and Vellar River)
5. Indian Bank

== Tholudur ==
1. Primary Health Centre
2. Higher Secondary School (with cricket ground)
3. Girls' High School
4. PDS centre

== Schools ==
List of schools that serve people as below.

- Government Higher Secondary School
- Girls' High School
- National Matric School
- O.P.R. Nursery & Primary School
- Elementary and Middle School – Ramanatham

== Commerce and landmarks in Ramanatham ==
- Kuppusamy Thirumana Mandabam
- American Mahal Thirumana Mandabam
- Santhi Mahal Thirumana Mandabam
- Vishan Computer Education
- NeelaRam Shopping Center
- Vinayagar Temple
- Lamcy Shopping Center
- Mosques
- Church

== Private colleges ==
- Dr. Navalar Nedunchezhiyan College of Engineering
- Sree Arumugam Polytechnic College
- Sree Arumugam Arts and Science College
- Sree Arumugham College of Education
- Sree Arumugam Teacher Training Institute
- Sree Renga Teacher Training Institute

== Festivals ==
Each temple has its own festivals.

Pongal is the main festival and lasts four days.

1. Bhogi is celebrated without pollution and with kozhukattai, El-Urundai, etc.
2. Pongal is for delicious pongal.
3. Mattu Pongal features decorated cattle being fed pongal.
4. Kaanum Pongal is to see people and play on the riverbed. This day is for non-vegetarian food.
5. Diwali
6. Ramzan
7. Christmas
