= Arangur =

Arangur அரங்கூர்
- Village Panchayat
- Location within Tamil Nadu Location within India
- Coordinates: 11°23′54.9″N 79°01′34.5″E
- Country: India
- State: Tamil Nadu
- District: Cuddalore
- Taluk: Tittakudi
- Block: Mangalur block
- Panchayat ID: 5
- Post Office: Vagaiyur
- Wards: 9: Throwpathi Amman Kovil Street; Mariyamman Kovil Street; East Street; West Street; School Street; Perumal Kovil Street; Pillaiyar Kovil Street; Kalani Mariyamman Kovil Street; Anna Nagar

Government
  - Type: Gram panchayat
  - President: Raja
  - Vice President: Selvam

Population
  - Total: 2,152
- PIN Code: 606106
- Area code: 04143
- Website: www.arangur.in

Arangur (அரங்கூர்) is a village panchayat in Tittakudi taluk, Cuddalore district.

== Location ==
Arangur is located 10 km west from Tittakudi and 2 km east from NH45 near Tholudur.
