= Vellalakundam =

- Village
- Location in Tamil Nadu, India Vellalakundam (India)
- Coordinates: 11°37′45″N 78°19′42″E
- Country: India
- State: Tamil Nadu
- District: Salem
- Taluk: Vazhapadi
- Metro: Salem Metropolitan Area

Area
  - Total: 22.1 km^{2} (8.5 sq mi)

Population (2011)
  - Total: 6,904
  - Density: 312/km^{2} (809/sq mi)
- Time zone: UTC+5:30 (IST)

Vellalakundam is a village in the Vazhapadi taluk of Salem district, in Tamil Nadu, India.

== Geography ==
Vellalakundam is within Vazhapadi taluk, which is in the central part of Salem district. It covers 22.1 square kilometres (8.5 sq mi) of land in the southwestern part of the taluk, near the border with Salem taluk. It is located 8 kilometres (5.0 mi) southwest of Vazhapadi, the taluk headquarters, 20 kilometres (12 mi) east of Salem, the district headquarters, and 260 kilometres (160 mi) southwest of the state capital of Chennai. It is to the north of a reserved forest that is between the town and Tirumanur. Vellalakundam is within the drainage basin of the Vellar River, and the Singipuram River, a tributary of the Vellar, flows through the town during the wet season.

== Demographics ==
In 2011 Vellalakundam had a population of 6,904 people living in 1,843 households. 3,470 (50.3%) of the inhabitants were male, while 3,434 (49.7%) were female. 695 children in the town, about 10% of the population, were at or below the age of 6. The literacy rate in the town was 64.9%%. Scheduled Castes and Scheduled Tribes accounted for 24% and 0.3% of the population, respectively.
