= Ayothiyapattinam block =

Ayothiyapattinam block is a revenue block of Salem district of the Indian state of Tamil Nadu. This revenue block consist of 32 panchayat villages. They are:

1. A. N. Mangalam
2. Achankuttapatty
3. Adhikaripatti
4. Aladipatti
5. Anupur
6. Chinnagoundapuram
7. Chinnanur
8. D. Perumapalayam
9. Dasanaickenpatti
10. Karipatti
11. Karumapuram
12. Kootathupatti
13. Korathupatti
14. Kullampatti
15. Kuppanur
16. M. Palapatti
17. M. Perumapalayam
18. M. Thathanur
19. Masinaickenpatti
20. Mettupatti
21. Minnampalli
22. Pallipatti
23. Periyagoundapuram
24. Poovanoor
25. S. N. Mangalam
26. Sukkampatti
27. Thailanur
28. Udayapatti
29. Valaiyakaranur
30. Valasaiyur
31. Veeranam
32. Vellalagundam
