= Meladhanur =

Coordinates: 11.4624623°N 79.1007502°E

Meladhanur is a village located in Tittakudi taluk, Cuddalore district in the state of Tamil Nadu, India. Tittakudi is the nearest town for this village and the Trichy to Chennai highway (NH45) is the nearest one.

== Demographics ==
In 2011, the population was 1,015 people with 518 males and 497 females.

The village is located near Wellington Lake and it has a PUM School and Perumal, Vinayagar, Mariamman and Aiyanar temples. Most of the population being farmers.
