= Kurichi, Salem =

Village in Tamil Nadu, India

Kurichi
- Village
- Location in Tamil Nadu, India Kurichi (India)
- Coordinates: 11°43′39″N 78°24′38″E
- Country: India
- State: Tamil Nadu
- District: Salem
- Taluk: Vazhapadi

Area
  - Total: 17.91 km^{2} (6.92 sq mi)

Population (2011)
  - Total: 8,043
  - Density: 449.1/km^{2} (1,163/sq mi)
- Time zone: UTC+5:30 (IST)

Kurichi is a village in the Vazhapadi taluk of Salem district, in Tamil Nadu, India.

== Geography ==
Kurichi is within Vazhapadi taluk, which is in the central part of Salem district. It covers 17.91 square kilometres (6.92 sq mi) of land in the eastern part of the taluk, north of Belur and south of the Kalrayan Hills, near the border with Peddanayakkan Palayam taluk. It is located 8 kilometres (5.0 mi) north of Vazhapadi, the taluk headquarters, 29 kilometres (18 mi) northeast of Salem, the district headquarters, and 250 kilometres (160 mi) southwest of the state capital of Chennai. Kurichi is within the drainage basin of the Vellar River, and the Anaimuduvu River, a tributary of the Vellar, flows past the village during the wet season.

== Demographics ==
In 2011 Kurichi had a population of 8,043 people living in 2,120 households. 4,091 (50.9%) of the inhabitants were male, while 3,952 (49.1%) were female. 841 children in the town, about 10.5% of the population, were at or below the age of 6. The literacy rate in the town was 62.7%. Scheduled Castes and Scheduled Tribes accounted for about 11% and 0.3% of the population, respectively.
