= Kilai =

Kilai may refer to:

- Kilai County, former name of Hualien County, Taiwan Province, Taiwan
- Kilai City, former name of Hualien City, a port city and the seat of Hualien County

== See also ==
- Killai, town in Tamil Nadu, India
- Kiai, a short shout uttered when performing an attacking move in Japanese martial arts
