= Avinangudi =

Avinangudi ஆவினங்குடி
- Village
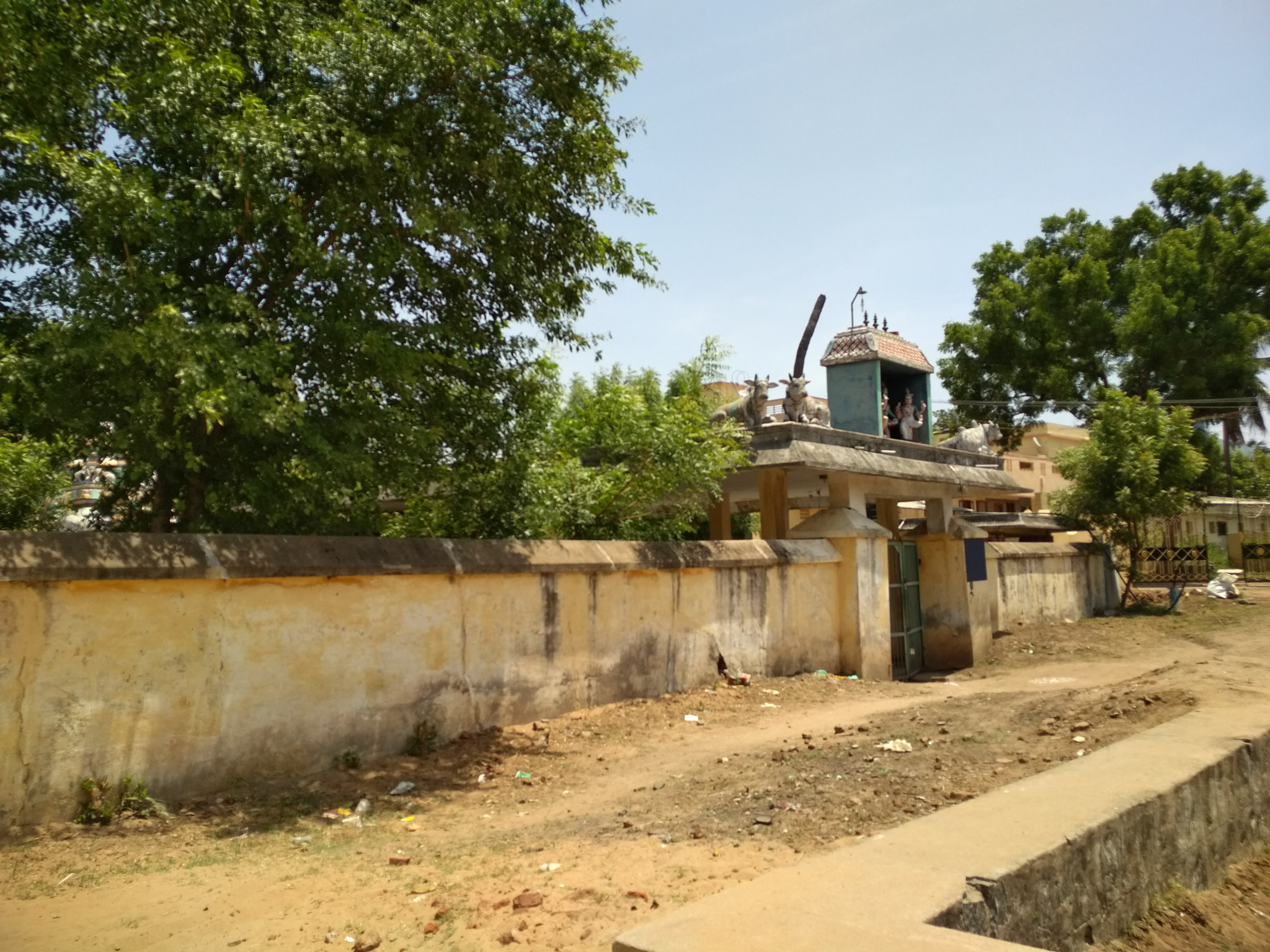

- Location in Tamil Nadu, India
- Coordinates: 11°23′N 79°10′E
- Country: India
- State: Tamil Nadu
- District: Cuddalore
- Taluk: Tittakudi

Government
  - Type: Gram panchayat

Area
  - Total: 97.52 ha (241.0 acres)

Population (2011)
  - Total: 2,858
  - Density: 2,931/km^{2} (7,590/sq mi)

Languages
  - Official: Tamil
- Time zone: UTC+5:30 (IST)
- PIN: 606111 / 606112
- Vehicle registration: TN - 31
- Nearest town: Tittakudi

Avinangudi (Tamil :ஆவினங்குடி) is a village and gram panchayat in the Tittakudi taluk, Mangalur block of Cuddalore district, Tamil Nadu, India.

It is located at approximately 11°23′N 79°10′E, about 6–7 km from Tittakudi and roughly 75–85 km from the district headquarters at Cuddalore. The village has an area of about 97.52 hectares.

== Demographics ==
According to the 2011 Census of India, Avinangudi had a population of 2,858 (1,440 males and 1,418 females) living in 720 households. The sex ratio was approximately 985 females per 1,000 males. Children in the age group 0–6 numbered around 310. Scheduled Castes constituted a large proportion of the population (approximately 55%). Literacy rates derived from the census data fall in the range of roughly 62–70%.

== Geography and administration ==
Avinangudi is primarily an agricultural village. It falls under the Mangalur block and the Tittakudi assembly constituency. The nearest major town is Tittakudi. The nearest railway station is at Pennadam (approximately 7 km away).

A Viswanatha Swami Temple is located in the village.
