= Vilaripalayam =

- village
- Location in Tamil Nadu, India Vilaripalayam (India)
- Coordinates: 11°35′50″N 78°24′51″E
- Country: India
- State: Tamil Nadu
- District: Salem

Population (2011)
  - Total: 1,151

Languages
  - Official: Tamil
- Time zone: UTC+5:30 (IST)
- PIN: 636115
- Telephone code: 04292
- Lok Sabha constituency: Kallakurichi (Lok Sabha constituency)
- Vidhan Sabha constituency: Yercaud (state assembly constituency)

Vilaripalayam is a village in Valapady block in Salem District of Tamil Nadu State, India. It is located 33 km towards East from District headquarters Salem. 8 km from Valapady. 300 km from State capital Chennai. The total geographical area of village is 109.87 hectares. It has a total population of 1,151 peoples. There are about 338 houses in Vilaripalayam village. Valapady is nearest town to Vilaripalayam.

== Geography and climate ==
Vilaripalayam has a tropical savanna climate (Köppen climate classification Aw). January and February are generally pleasant; the hot summer begins in March, with the year's highest temperatures during April. Pre-monsoon thunderstorms occur during April and May. The Southwest monsoon season lasts from June to September. The northeast monsoon occurs from October to December.

== Demography ==
Tamil is the local language here.

== Transport ==
- The nearest Bus Stand is located at Vazhapadi
- The nearest Railway stations are located at Vazhapadi, Ettapur Road.
- The nearest Airport is Salem Airport (India), about 56 km away.

== Government Buildings ==
Vilaripalayam has the following Government buildings.

1. Government Secondary School (Up to 10th Standard) State Board Syllabus.
2. Post Office.
3. General Library
4. Public Distribution Center

== Temples in Vilaripalayam ==
- Muthumariyamman Temple
- Lord Vinayagar Temple
- Lord Murugan Temple
- Lord Venkateshwara Temple
