= Singipuram =

Singapuram
- Village
- Location in Tamil Nadu, India Singapuram (India)
- Coordinates: 11°37′28″N 78°24′26″E
- Country: India
- State: Tamil Nadu
- District: Salem
- Taluk: Vazhapadi

Area
  - Total: 12.7 km^{2} (4.9 sq mi)

Population (2011)
  - Total: 6,868
  - Density: 541/km^{2} (1,400/sq mi)
- Time zone: UTC+5:30 (IST)

Singapuram is a village in the Vazhapadi taluk of Salem district, in Tamil Nadu, India.

== Geography ==
Singapuram is within Vazhapadi taluk, which is in the central part of Salem district. It covers 12.7 square kilometres (4.9 sq mi) of land in the southeastern part of the taluk, near the border with Peddanayakkan Palayam taluk. It is located 3.5 kilometres (2.2 mi) south of Vazhapadi, the taluk headquarters, 28 kilometres (17 mi) of Salem, the district headquarters, and 260 kilometres (160 mi) of the state capital of Chennai. Singapuram is within the drainage basin of the Vellar River, and the Singapuram River, a tributary of the Vellar, flows past the town during the wet season.

== Demographics ==
In 2011 Singapuram had a population of 6,868 people living in 1,841 households. 3,428 (49.91%) of the inhabitants were male, while 3,440 (50.09%) were female. 708 children in the town, about 10% of the population, were at or below the age of 6. The literacy rate in the town was 65.6%. Scheduled Castes and Scheduled Tribes accounted for 12.8% and 0% of the population, respectively.
