= M.Perumalpalayam =

- Village
- Location in Tamil Nadu, India M.Perumalpalayam (India)
- Coordinates: 11°40′21″N 78°18′47″E
- Country: India
- State: Tamil Nadu
- District: Salem
- Taluk: Vazhapadi

Area
  - Total: 5.5 km^{2} (2.1 sq mi)

Population (2011)
  - Total: 5,232
  - Density: 950/km^{2} (2,500/sq mi)
- Time zone: UTC+5:30 (IST)

M.Perumalpalayam is a village in the Vazhapadi taluk of Salem district, in Tamil Nadu, India.

== Geography ==
M.Perumalpalayam is within Vazhapadi taluk, which is in the central part of Salem district. It covers 5.5 square kilometres (2.1 sq mi) of land in the taluk, just to the southwest of its Gudamalai reserved forest, which occupies its geographic center. It is located 10 kilometres (6.2 mi) west of Vazhapadi, the taluk headquarters, 15 kilometres (9.3 mi) east of Salem, the district headquarters, and 260 kilometres (160 mi) southwest of the state capital of Chennai. The only railway in Vazhapadi taluk runs through the village, and National Highway 79 passes to its south.

== Demographics ==
In 2011 M.Perumalpalayam had a population of 5,232 people living in 1,360 households. The numbers of male and female inhabitants were almost equal, with 2,615 male and 2,617 female residents. 509 children in the town, about 10% of the population, were at or below the age of 6. The literacy rate in the town was 57.5%. Scheduled Castes and Scheduled Tribes accounted for 65.4% and 0.05% of the population, respectively.
