= Keelakalpoondi =

Kilakalpoondi கீழக்கல்பூண்டி
- Village
- Location in Tamil Nadu, India
- Coordinates: 11.429°N 78.949°E
- Country: India
- State: Tamil Nadu
- District: Cuddalore
- Taluk: Tittakudi

Government
  - Type: Panchayati raj
  - Body: Keelakalpoondi Gram Panchayat

Area
  - Total: 295.25 ha (729.6 acres)

Population (2011)
  - Total: 1,171
  - Density: 396.6/km^{2} (1,027/sq mi)

Languages
  - Official: Tamil
- Time zone: UTC+5:30 (IST)
- PIN: 606303
- Vehicle registration: TN-31
- Nearest town: Tittakudi
- Lok Sabha constituency: Cuddalore
- Vidhan Sabha constituency: Tittakudi

Keelakalpoondi (Tamil:கீழக்கல்பூண்டி) is a village in the Tittakudi taluk of Cuddalore district in the Indian state of Tamil Nadu. It is administered by the Keelakalpoondi Gram Panchayat under the Mangalur block.

== Demographics ==
According to the 2011 Census of India, Kilakalpoondi had a total population of 1,171 people living in 281 households. Of this, 585 were males and 586 were females. The sex ratio was 1,002 females per 1,000 males. The literacy rate of the village was 60.63%.

== Geography ==
Kilakalpoondi covers an area of 295.25 hectares (2.95 km²). It is located approximately 20 km from the taluk headquarters Tittakudi and about 110 km from the district headquarters Cuddalore. The village falls under the PIN code 606303.

== Administration ==
Kilakalpoondi is administered by the Keelakalpoondi Gram Panchayat under the Mangalur Community Development Block in Cuddalore district. The Gram Panchayat has the Local Government Directory (LGD) code 222705 and consists of a single village divided into six wards.

The village comes under the Tittakudi State Assembly constituency and the Cuddalore Lok Sabha constituency.

== Education ==
The village has a Panchayat Union Primary School. Private educational institutions in the area include Acharya Nursery and Primary School and Annai Teresa Matriculation Higher Secondary School.
