= Tholudur Madhurantaka Choleswarar =

Temple in Tholudur, Tamil Nadu

Tholudur Thozhudur, Thozhudhur, Toludur
- Town
- Location in Tamil Nadu, India
- Coordinates: 11.40686°N 79.00658°E
- Country: India
- State: Tamil Nadu
- District: Cuddalore

Languages
  - Official: Tamil
- Time zone: UTC+5:30 (IST)
- Postal code: 606303
- Telephone code: 04143
- Nearest city: Trichy, Perambalure

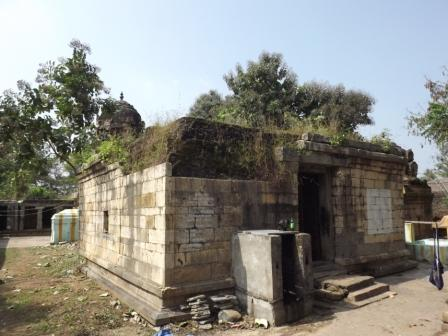
Temple View

Tholudur Madhurantaka Choleswarar Temple (மதுராந்தக சோளீஸ்வரர் கோவில்) is a temple for the Hindu deity Shiva in Tholudur, Tamil Nadu, India.
