= Alambadi =

Alambadi may refer to:

== People ==
- Alambadi (politician) (1936–2026), Indian politician

== Other ==
- Alambadi (cattle), a breed of cattle
- Alambadi, Cuddalore, a village panchayat in Cuddalore district, Tamil Nadu
