= M. S. Janarthanam =

Indian judge (1936–2025)

Justice M.S. Janarthanam

Judge of the Madras High Court
- In office 14 August 1988 – 1998

Personal details
- Born: 9 May 1936 Chidambaram Taluk, Tamil Nadu
- Died: 6 June 2025 (aged 89)
- Education: Annamalai University, Madras Law College

M. S. Janarthanam (9 May 1936 – 6 June 2025) was an Indian judge, legal scholar, and public administrator who served as a Judge of the Madras High Court from 1988 to 1998.

He contributed heavily to criminal jurisprudence, consumer law, reservation policy, and social justice reforms in Tamil Nadu.

== Early life and education ==
He was born on 9 May 1936 in Nathamedu village, Chidambaram Taluk, Tamil Nadu. His parents were Sadhasivam and Shembagam. He completed his schooling at Pachaiyappa's High School, Chidambaram (1942–1953). He pursued higher education at Annamalai University and later at Madras Law College between 1953 and 1960, earning degrees in B.Com (Hons), M.A., F.L., and B.L. He married Anusuya Janarthanam and had four children.

== Career ==
=== Legal career ===
He enrolled as a member of the Bar in 1962. He trained under Public Prosecutor Parthasarathy Naidu and went on to establish himself as a criminal lawyer in Cuddalore district. Over the course of his practice, he conducted around 500 murder trials.

=== Judicial career ===
He entered the Tamil Nadu State Judicial Service through direct recruitment and was appointed as District and Sessions Judge in 1974, serving in various districts across the state. In 1980, he was appointed Registrar of the High Court of Madras, a position he held until 1988. On 14 August 1988, he was elevated as a Judge of the Madras High Court, where he served for a decade. Many of his judgments were published in leading Indian and international law journals.

=== Post-retirement roles ===
After retiring from the High Court in 1998, he held several public positions:

1. Executive Chairman, Tamil Nadu State Legal Services Authority
2. Member, Central Council of Health and Family Welfare (Government of India)
3. President, State Consumer Disputes Redressal Commission, Tamil Nadu
4. Chairman, Tamil Nadu Backward Classes Commission (2006–2018)

== Contributions ==
He was known for his extensive work on reservation policy and social equity.

He strengthened reservation provisions for Muslims based on social and educational backwardness and lead the One-Man Commission of Inquiry recommending special internal reservation for Arunthathiyars within the Scheduled Caste quota.

He also authored the landmark report justifying 69% reservation in Tamil Nadu which formed the basis of the Tamil Nadu Act 45 of 1994.
