= Tholudur =

Towns in Tamil Nadu, India

Thozhudur Thozhudur
- Panchayat
- Location in Tamil Nadu, India Thozhudur (India)
- Coordinates: 11.40686°N 79.00658°E
- Country: India
- State: Tamil Nadu
- District: Cuddalore

Languages
  - Official: Tamil
- Time zone: UTC+5:30 (IST)
- PIN: 606303
- Telephone code: 04143
- Vehicle registration: TN 91
- Nearest Town: Perambalur, Trichy, Cuddalore, Vilupuram
- Lok Sabha constituency: Cuddalore
- State Legislative constituency: Tittagudi

Thozhudur, (meaning "village of worshipVellar River in Cuddalore District, Tamil Nadu, India.

Thozhudur is well served by government institutions like schools, post office, etc. Other private educational institutes like schools and colleges serve people. All major hotels, banks, shopping center, bus stands, marriage halls, a petrol/diesel/gas station are located on Tholudur highway whereas Tholudur is popularly known for its traditional houses.

People bus stand as Tholudur stop, however, Tholudur is 1 km away from this stop. This is due to British rule as during their time they referred to this place as Tholudur.

The main occupation of the people is agriculture. Rice, sugarcane, groundnut and other cereals are generally cultivated. The village has a river, a lake, and green pastures.

Cricket and badminton are the favorite sports and tournaments have been conducted for decades.

The higher secondary school boasts different varieties of trees. Nearby is a Chivan (Sivan) temple with inscriptions of Chola dynasty.

== Location ==
Thozhudur towns are located on the banks of Vellar River. Ramanatham is situated on NH 45 the highway connecting the state capital Chennai and Trichycities - Tholudur is 1 km from Ramanatham main road. Also it is 15 km far from the nearest town panchayat Tittakudi which is also its Taluk. Ramanatham - Tholudur is 246 km away from Chennai and 76 km away from Trichy.

== Government institutions ==
1. Thozhudur Dam
2. Thozhudur Lake
3. Thozhudur PWD Office
4. Thozhudur rain weather forecast (IMD)
5. Thozhudur bus stand
6. Primary agricultural cooperative credit society
7. Direct Paddy Procurement centre
8. Government Hospital
9. Higher Secondary School(with cricket ground)
10. Girls' High School
11. Sub division Post Office
12. Registrar Office
13. Veterinary hospital
14. PDS centre
15. Co-operative bank
16. TNEB -SUB STATION&OFFICE
17. E Seva centre
18. Dr.Navalar Neduncheliyan Engineering & Aarumugam Arts and sciences, Polytechnic institute college
19. Revenue Inspector Office
20. Village administration office
21. Aadhi Tamizhar elementary school
22. Library
23. Indian gas Office& godown
24. Panchayat office
25. river Water distribution centre
26. Government boys' hostels-2
27. Government girls' hostel-2

== Thozhudur ==
1. Thozhudur Dam
2. Thozhudur Lake
3. Thozhudur PWD Office
4. Thozhudur rain weather forecast (IMD)
5. Thozhudur bus stand
6. Primary agricultural cooperative credit society
7. Direct Paddy Procurement centre
8. Government Hospital
9. Higher Secondary School(with cricket ground)
10. Girls' High School
11. Sub division Post Office
12. Registrar Office
13. Veterinary hospital
14. PDS centre
15. Co-operative bank
16. TNEB -SUB STATION&OFFICE
17. E Seva centre
18. Dr.Navalar Neduncheliyan Engineering & Aarumugam Arts and sciences, Polytechnic institute college
19. Revenue Inspector Office
20. Village administration office
21. Aadhi Tamizhar elementary school
22. Library
23. Indian gas Office& godown
24. Panchayat office
25. river Water distribution centre
26. Government boys' hostels-2
27. Government girls' hostel-2
28. Sri varatharaajaperumaal temple
29. Sri madhurandhaga chozhishwarar temple

== THOLUDUR -(Ramanatham) ==
1. Indian Bank
2. Police Station
3. Bus Stand for all Bus to stop
4. Petrol/Gas Stations
5. Panchayat owned Marriage Hall

== Festivals ==
All gods reside here and are celebrated. Each temple has its own festivals.

Thai Pongal is the major festival lasting four days.

1. Bhogi is celebrated without pollution and tummy full of eatable like kozhukattai, El-Urundai, etc.
2. Pongal is for actual delicious pongal.
3. Mattu Pongal is for cattle that are decorated and fed delicious pongal.
4. Kaanum Pongal is to see people and play on the riverbed. This day is for non-veg specials.
1. aadi peruku is one of the festival . This day is for non-veg specials.

Deepavali(Diwali), Ramzan and Christmas are other festivals celebrated.
