= Tukkiyampalayam =

- Village
- Location in Tamil Nadu, India Tukkiyampalayam (India)
- Coordinates: 11°41′23″N 78°24′32″E
- Country: India
- State: Tamil Nadu
- District: Salem
- Taluk: Vazhapadi

Area
  - Total: 7.76 km^{2} (3.00 sq mi)

Population (2011)
  - Total: 5,385
  - Density: 694/km^{2} (1,800/sq mi)
- Time zone: UTC+5:30 (IST)

Tukkiyampalayam is a village in the Vazhapadi taluk of Salem district, in Tamil Nadu, India.

== Geography ==
Tukkiyampalayam is within Vazhapadi taluk, which is in the central part of Salem district. It covers 7.76 square kilometres (3.00 sq mi) of land in the eastern part of the taluk, near the border with Peddanayakkan Palayam taluk, between Vazhapadi and Belur. It is located 4 kilometres (2.5 mi) north of Vazhapadi, the taluk headquarters, 28 kilometres (17 mi) east of Salem, the district headquarters, and 250 kilometres (160 mi) southwest of the state capital of Chennai.

== Demographics ==
In 2011 Tukkiyampalayam had a population of 5,385 people living in 1,394 households. 2,769 (51.4%) of the inhabitants were male, while 2,616 (48.6%) were female. 614 children in the town, about 11% of the population, were at or below the age of 6. The literacy rate in the town was 62.1%. Scheduled Castes and Scheduled Tribes accounted for 28.4% and 0.01% of the population, respectively.
