= Minnampalli =

- Village
- Location in Salem, India Minnampalli (Tamil Nadu) Minnampalli (India)
- Coordinates: 11°40′28″N 78°16′09″E
- Country: India
- State: Tamil Nadu
- District: Salem
- Taluk: Vazhapadi
- Metro: Salem Metropolitan Area

Area
  - Total: 7.7 km^{2} (3.0 sq mi)

Population (2011)
  - Total: 9,327
  - Density: 1,200/km^{2} (3,100/sq mi)
- Time zone: UTC+5:30 (IST)

Minnampalli is a village in the Vazhapadi taluk of Salem district, in Tamil Nadu, India.

== Geography ==
Minnampalli is within Vazhapadi taluk, which is in the central part of Salem district. It covers 7.7 square kilometres (3.0 sq mi) of land in the western part of the taluk, near the border with Salem taluk. It is located 14 kilometres (8.7 mi) west of Vazhapadi, the taluk headquarters, 11 kilometres (6.8 mi) east of Salem, the district headquarters, and 270 kilometres (170 mi) southwest of the state capital of Chennai. The only railway line in Vazhapadi taluk, along with National Highway 79, pass to the south of the town.

== Demographics ==
In 2011 Minnampalli had a population of 9,327 people living in 2,272 households. 4,770 (51.1%) of the inhabitants were male, while 4,557 (48.9%) were female. 1,001 children in the town, about 11% of the population, were at or below the age of 6. The literacy rate in the town was 69.0%. Scheduled Castes and Scheduled Tribes accounted for 51.9% and 0.06% of the population, respectively.
