= Masinaickenpatti =

- Town
- Location in Salem, India Masinaickenpatti (Tamil Nadu) Masinaickenpatti (India)
- Coordinates: 11.6697°N 78.2240°E
- Country: India
- State: Tamil Nadu
- District: Salem
- Taluk: Vazhapadi
- Metro: Salem Metropolitan Area

Area
  - Total: 7.33 km^{2} (2.83 sq mi)

Population (2011)
  - Total: 9,098
  - Density: 1,240/km^{2} (3,210/sq mi)
- Time zone: UTC+5:30 (IST)

Masinaickenpatti is a census town in the Vazhapadi taluk of Salem district, in Tamil Nadu, India.

== Geography ==
Masinaickenpatti is within Vazhapadi taluk, which is in the central part of Salem district. It is in the western part of the taluk, near the border with Salem taluk. It is located 19 kilometres (12 mi) west of Vazhapadi, the taluk headquarters, 8 kilometres (5.0 mi) east of Salem, the district headquarters, and 270 kilometres (170 mi) southwest of the state capital of Chennai. It is south of the Shevaroy Hills which surround the town of Yercaud. National Highways 79 and 179A run through the town.

== Demographics ==
In 2011 Masinaickenpatti had a population of 9,098 people. 4,695 (51.6%) of the inhabitants were male, while 4,403 (48.4%) were female. 903 children in the town, about 10% of the population, were at or below the age of 6. The literacy rate in the town was 70.6%. Scheduled Castes and Scheduled Tribes accounted for about 22% and 0.02% of the population, respectively.
