= J.Krishnapuram =

- Village
- Location in the Tamil Nadu
- Coordinates: 10.8048962°N 77.2383598°E
- Country: India
- State: Tamil Nadu
- District: Coimbatore
- Taluka: Sulur
- Panchayat Block: Sultanpet
- PIN: 641671

J.Krishnapuram is a Panchayat village in Sulur Taluk of Kamanaicken Palayam in Coimbatore district, Tamil Nadu, India.It is near to Senjery hills. Livelihood of most of the population in this village is self employment in agriculture (coconut, maize, vegetables etc.).
