= Wellington Lake =

- Location within Tamil Nadu
- Location: Cuddalore district, Tamil Nadu, India
- Coordinates: 11°20′10″N 79°32′40″E
- Type: Reservoir, intermittent
- Basin countries: India

Wellington Lake is a lake situated in the Keelachiruvoi, Pulivalam to Ivanur Alambadi villages (near Tittakudi) Tittakudi taluk of the Cuddalore district in Tamil Nadu, India. It is the second-largest lake in Tamil Nadu after the Veeranam Lake, which also is situated in the Cuddalore district.

It is primarily a rain-fed lake, while its main tributary is the Vellar River that originates from the Shevaroy Hills. Smaller creeks that originate from the Nangoor reserve forest and the Lakkur reserve forest form the secondary tributaries.

The Wellington Lake also has about 27 ancillary lakes and together they form the primary source of irrigation for nearly 25,000 acres (10,000 hectares) of land and over 67 villages dependent on it for cultivation.

The lake is also a noted trout fishery and home to a small-scale inland fishing industry.
