= Killai =

- Town
- Location in Tamil Nadu, India Killai (India)
- Coordinates: 11.4532°N 79.7792°E
- Country: India
- State: Tamil Nadu
- District: Cuddalore

Area
  - Total: 15.98 km^{2} (6.17 sq mi)
- Elevation: 12.7 m (42 ft)

Population (2011)
  - Total: 13,608
  - Density: 851.6/km^{2} (2,206/sq mi)

Languages
  - Official: Tamil
- Time zone: UTC+5:30 (IST)

Killai is a second-grade panchayat town in the Chidambaram taluk of the Cuddalore district of Tamil Nadu, India.

== Geography ==
Killai is spread over 15.98 square kilometres (6.17 sq mi) of land in the Chidambaram taluk of Cuddalore district. It is located with the geographic coordinates of (11.4532°N 79.7792°E) at the mouth of the Vellar River. It is on the river's south bank, across from the town of Parangipettai. The only reserve forests in the taluk are located to the south of the town. The Killai and Pichavaram reserve forests, which contain mangrove forest ecosystems, also contain the Killai backwater, part of the Vellar River's estuary.

== Demographics ==
In 2011, there were 3,359 households in the town, which had a population of 13,608 people. 6,851, or about 50.3% of the population were male, while 6,757, about 49.7%, were female. 1,710 children, about 12.6% of the town's population, were at or below the age of 6 in 2011. 4,236, about 31.1% of the population, were classified by the census as scheduled castes or scheduled tribes. 67.4% of the population was literate.
