= Thirumandagoundanpalayam =

Village in Tamil Nadu, India

Thirumandagoundanpalayam is a small village in Puliyampatti Panchayat, in Kamanaicken Palayam rural area in Coimbatore district of the Indian state of Tamil Nadu. Situated on the state highway-87 (SH-87) which connects the towns of Pollachi and Sathyamanglam, Thirumandagoundanpalayam is situated in 35 km southeast of Coimbatore city and 25 km west from Tirupur

== Transport ==
The village has a good connecting through road and there are frequent buses for nearby cities like Coimbatore Tirupur palladam Pollachi and Sulur. The nearest airport is Coimbatore International Airport and the nearest railway station is Sulur railway station. NH 67 and SH-87 are the nearest highways.

== Business and economy ==
Most people in the village are employed in weaving and agriculture.

== Wealth and health ==
A large Cotton mill implemented in this village, is known as Brindavan Cotton Mills, which has more than 200 employees from nearby villages. Other mills include Sumeru, Vigneswara and Bannari Mills. The government has started a Government Hospital project in the village.
