= Kodandaramaswamy Temple, Ayodhyapatinam =

Kodandaramaswamy Kovil
- Location within Salem Location within Tamil Nadu Location within India

Religion
- Affiliation: Hinduism
- District: Salem district
- Deity: Kodandaramaswamy (Rama), Seethalakshmi (Sita)

Location
- Location: Ayodhyapattinam
- State: Tamil Nadu
- Country: India
- Interactive map of Kodandaramaswamy Kovil
- Coordinates: 11.6748°N 78.2385°E

Architecture
- Type: Dravidian architecture
- Creator: Vijayanagara dynasty

Kodandaramaswamy Temple or Pattabi Rama Temple is a Hindu temple located in the Salem district of Tamil Nadu, India. The temple is glorified by Valmiki, Vasishta, Bharadvaja and classified as one of the 108 Abhimana Kshethrams of the Vaishnavate tradition. This temple is called as the Dakshina Ayodhya (Ayodhya of South India). The temple is constructed in the South Indian style of architecture, dedicated to the god Rama, the seventh avatar of Vishnu. The temple is said to be built by Bharadvaja primarily and later constructed by Adhiyaman kings. The Raja Gopura of the temple is said to be built by Tirumala Nayaka.

Though the temple has historic roots, most of the present campus structure was rebuilt after the 14th century CE, further repaired, renovated and expanded in the 17th century by Madurai Nayaka king Tirumala Nayaka, a vassal of the Vijayanagara Empire. A granite wall surrounds the temple, enclosing all the shrines and the temple tank. There is a five-tiered rajagopuram, the temple's gateway tower. This structure is now maintained and administered by the Hindu Religious and Charitable Endowments Department, follows the Pancharatra agama.

== Legend ==
As per Legend, after departure from his kingdom Ayodhya to the forest, the exiled prince Rama visited the hermitage of the sage Bharadvaja. After Rama kills the demon Ravana of Lanka who kidnaped his wife Sita, Rama decides to return to Ayodhya. Rama is said to be so disciplined that he visits Bharadvaja once again while traveling from Lanka to Ayodhya. Rama, Sita, Lakshmana and Vibhishana stayed in the hermitage of Bharadvaja.

Bharadvaja wanted to see the coronation ceremony of Rama; he advised Rama to start his coronation here and complete it in Ayodhya. Rama acceded to the wishes of the sage and showered his blessings to Bharadvaja.

Besides Bharadvaja, the sages Vasishta and Valmiki are said to have worshipped here.

After the ritual consecration of the icon of Rama, Bharadvaja built the sanctum sanctorum and the pujas were continued by the sage and his disciples.

== Architecture ==
The temple has granite walls enclosing all the shrines and pierced by a five-tiered Raja Gopuram, the gateway tower. The temple is noted for its exquisite pillars. The presiding deity, Ramaswamy (Rama), along with Sita, is sported with two arms seated in the central shrine in an elevated structure with Bharata, Lakshmana, Shatrughna, Hanuman, Vibhishana, Bharadvaja and Vasishta serving and worshiping them. The sanctum sanctorum is constructed by the Adhiyaman kings, and later renovated by the Cholas and renovated and expanded in the 17th century by Madurai Nayaka king Tirumala Nayaka, a vassal of the Vijayanagara Empire. The temple has a Kodi Maram and a Garuda Sthambam, There are shrines dedicated for Sudarshana, Alvars, Hanuman and Andal. The temple has an old chariot of wood. The temple is a protected monument.

== Religious significance and practices ==
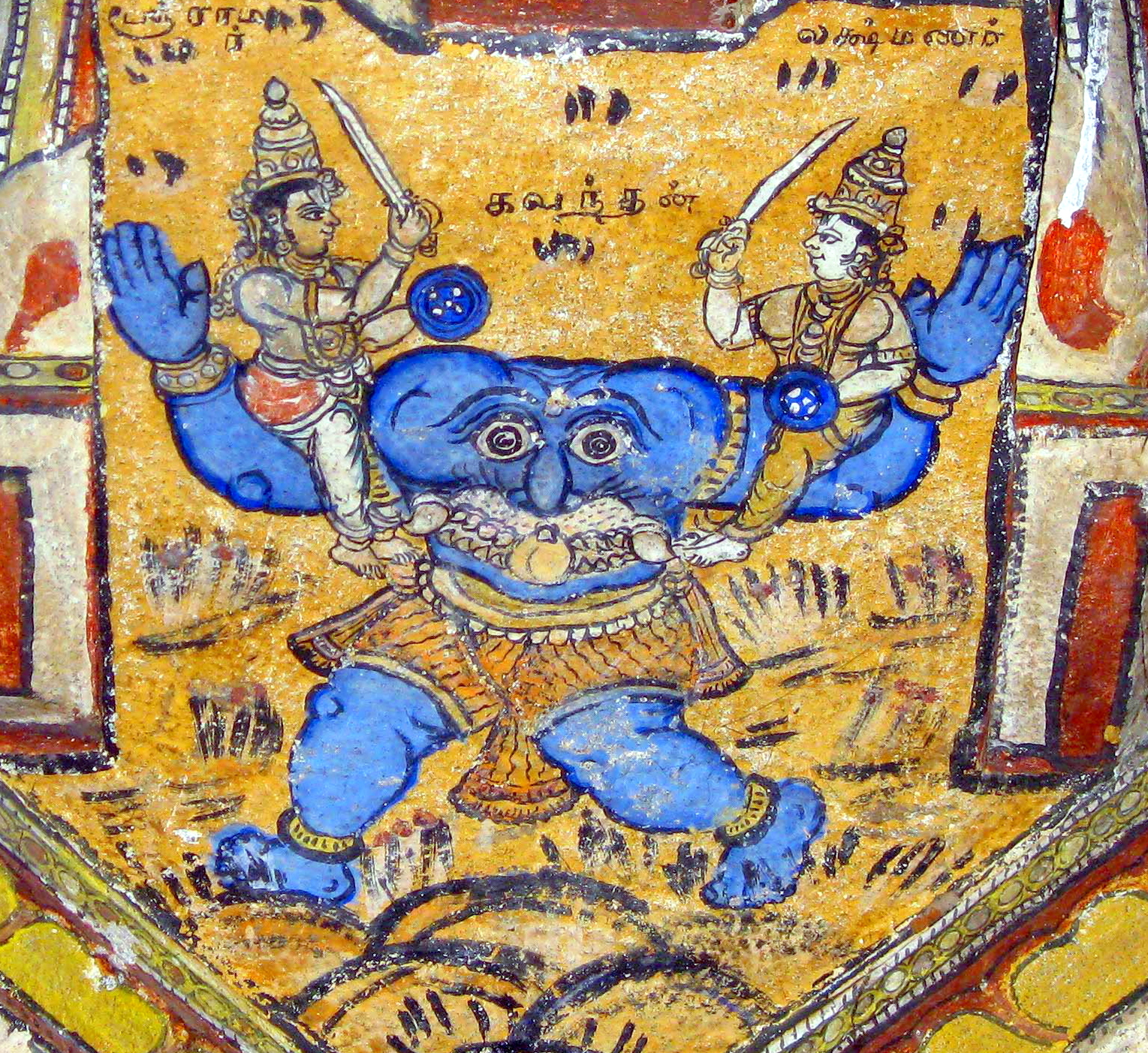
The Famous Painting of Kabandha is from this Temple's Mandapam.

The temple is also glorified by the composer Muthuswami Dikshitar in his Kshethra keerthis of Rama.He describes the beauty of Rama, Sita seated in the throne and worshiped by Bharata, Lakshmana, Shatrughna, Hanuman, Vibhishana, and Vasishta in the sanctum sanctorum, and the Mandapam in this temple in his keerthi Mamava pattaabhirama.

The festivals associated with Vishnu like Vaikunta Ekadasi, Krishna Janmashtami, Ramanavami and Adi Pooram are celebrated in the temple. The prime temple festival, the Brahmotsavam takes place every year in the month of Chaitra for 10 days around Ramanavami, which celebrates the birth of Rama.
