= Chinnamanaickenpalayam =

- suburb
- Nickname: vangapalayam
- Location in Tamil Nadu, India Chinnamanaickenpalayam (India)
- Coordinates: 10.801259°N 77.22389°E
- Country: India
- State: Tamil Nadu
- District: Coimbatore
- Panchayat: J.Krishnapuram
- Block: Sultanpet
- Talukas: sulur

Government
  - Panchayat President: Sakthivel

Languages
  - Official: Tamil
- Time zone: UTC+5:30 (IST)
- PIN: 641671
- Telephone code: (91)0455 288XXX
- Lok Sabha constituency: Coimbatore
- Vidhan Sabha constituency: Sulur

Chinnamanaickenpalayam is a village in the Sulur Taluk of Coimbatore district, Tamil Nadu, India.

== Location ==
The village of Chinnamanaickenpalayam is situated at coordinates 10°48′05″N 77°13′26″E, and is approximately 49 km from the Coimbatore Central Bus Station in Gandhipuram, 44 km from the Tiruppur Old Bus Stand, and 29 km from the Palladam Bus Station. The Thirumoorthy Dam is located 43 km away and the Amaravathi Dam is 48 km from the village. The nearest railway station is the Tiruppur Junction and the closest airport, the Coimbatore International Airport, is 49.3 km away.

== Occupation ==
Main occupation is Agriculture and the other businesses in this region are poultry farming, copra drying process, power loom weaving and Coconut/Coir Fibre manufacturing.

== Transport ==
Tiruppur old bus stand and Palladam bus stand can be reachable from Chinnamanaickenpalayam by public transport bus services.

=== Tiruppur to Senjeriputhur mofussil. ===
- 7:00 am towards Senjeriputhur
- 7:30 am towards Tiruppur
- 6:10 pm towards Senjeriputhur
- 7:00 pm towards Tiruppur

=== Palladam to J.Krishnapuram p16 town bus. ===
- 9:05 am towards J.Krishnapuram
- 9:45 am towards Palladam
- 2:40 pm towards J.Krishnapuram
- 3:15 pm towards Palladam
