= Alambadi, Cuddalore =

Alambadi ஆலம்பாடி
- Village / Panchayat
- Country: India
- State: Tamil Nadu
- District: Cuddalore
- Taluk: Tittakudi
- Block: Mangalur

Population (2011)
  - Total: 1,961
- Time zone: UTC+5:30 (Indian Standard Time (IST))
- PIN code: 606108

Alambadi is a village panchayat in the Cuddalore district in the Indian state of Tamil Nadu. It is located inside from 2 km of the National Highway NH-45 which is from Avatti X Road Bus Stop to Alambadi has 2 km. The whole 2 km road is fully surrounded by tamarind trees (புளியமரம்). And this village will come under Tittagudi Taluka as well as the constitution.

Alambadi has approximately 2000+ farmers' families. And their major work is agriculture. Also, this village has one government school. Which is named as Panjayat Union Middle school. Most of the current youngsters from Alambadi had completed the schooling in this PUM school only. This school has 1st standard to 8th standard. The total area of this school is approximately 5 acres.

== Overview of Alambadi ==
This is the best place for farmers, businessmen, employees, etc. Nearby College JSA Agriculture & Technology is located at NH-45 in Endhal. Nearby schools are Andavar Higher Secondary School (Kallur 606108) and Sarasvathy Arivalayam School (Kallur 606108). The Malar minibus facility is always available (Alambadi to Thittagudi). The Govt town bus (Number 3) bus facility is always available (Alambadi to Thittagudi). The Andavar minibus facility is always available (Alambadi to Thittagudi).

The school PUMS ALAMBADI is located in the area ALAMBADI of MANGALORE. PUMS ALAMBADI is in the CUDDALORE district of TAMIL NADU state. The PIN code is 606108. PUMS ALAMBADI MANGALORE was established in the year 1951. The management of PUMS ALAMBADI is Local Body.

PUMS ALAMBADI is a P. with U. primary school. The co-education status of PUMS ALAMBADI is Co-Educational. The residential status of PUMS ALAMBADI is no, and the residential type of PUMS ALAMBADI is not applicable. The total number of students in PUMS ALAMBADI MANGALORE is 225. The total number of teachers in PUMS ALAMBADI MANGALORE is 6. The total number of non-teaching staff in PUMS ALAMBADI is 1. The medium of instruction in PUMS ALAMBADI is Tamil.

The total number of classrooms in PUMS ALAMBADI is 10. The total number of other rooms in PUMS ALAMBADI is 0. The total number of blackboards in PUMS ALAMBADI is 12. The total number of books in the library of PUMS ALAMBADI is 660. The total number of computers in PUMS ALAMBADI MANGALORE is 5. The student teacher ratio of PUMS ALAMBADI MANGALORE is 38. The student classroom ratio of PUMS ALAMBADI is 23. The pass percentage of PUMS ALAMBADI is 100. The percentage of students who scored first class in PUMS ALAMBADI is 100.

== About Alambadi ==
Alambadi is a village in Mangalur Block in Cuddalore District of Tamil Nadu State, India. It is located 95 km towards west from district headquarters Cuddalore. 8 km from Mangalur. 257 km from the state capital Chennai.

Alambadi's pin code is 606108 and postal head office is Mangalur.

Kallur (3 km), Korakkai (4 km), T.eandal (4 km), Venganur (4 km), Meladhanur (5 km ) are the nearby Villages to Alambadi. Alambadi is surrounded by Nallur Block towards East, Veppur Block towards South, Thiagadurgam Block towards North, Sendurai Block towards South.

Tittakudi, Virudhachalam, Perambalur, Neyveli are the nearby Towns to Alambadi.

This place is on the border of the Cuddalore District and Perambalur District. Perambalur District, Veppur, is South towards this place.

== Alambadi 2011 Census Details ==
Alambadi's local languages are Tamil and English. Alambadi Village's total population is 1961, and the number of houses is 496. The female population is 50.0%. The village literacy rate is 69.9%, and the female literacy rate is 30.1%.

== Population ==
Census Parameter	Census Data
Total Population	1961
Total No of Houses	496
Female Population %	50.0 % (981)
Total Literacy rate %	69.9 % (1370)
Female Literacy rate	30.1 % (590)
Scheduled Tribes Population %	0.0 % (0)
Scheduled Caste Population %	44.1 % (865)
Working Population %	65.0 %
Child(0 -6) Population by 2011	191
Girl Child(0 -6) Population % by 2011	48.2 % (92)
