= Vellar River (Northern Tamil Nadu) =

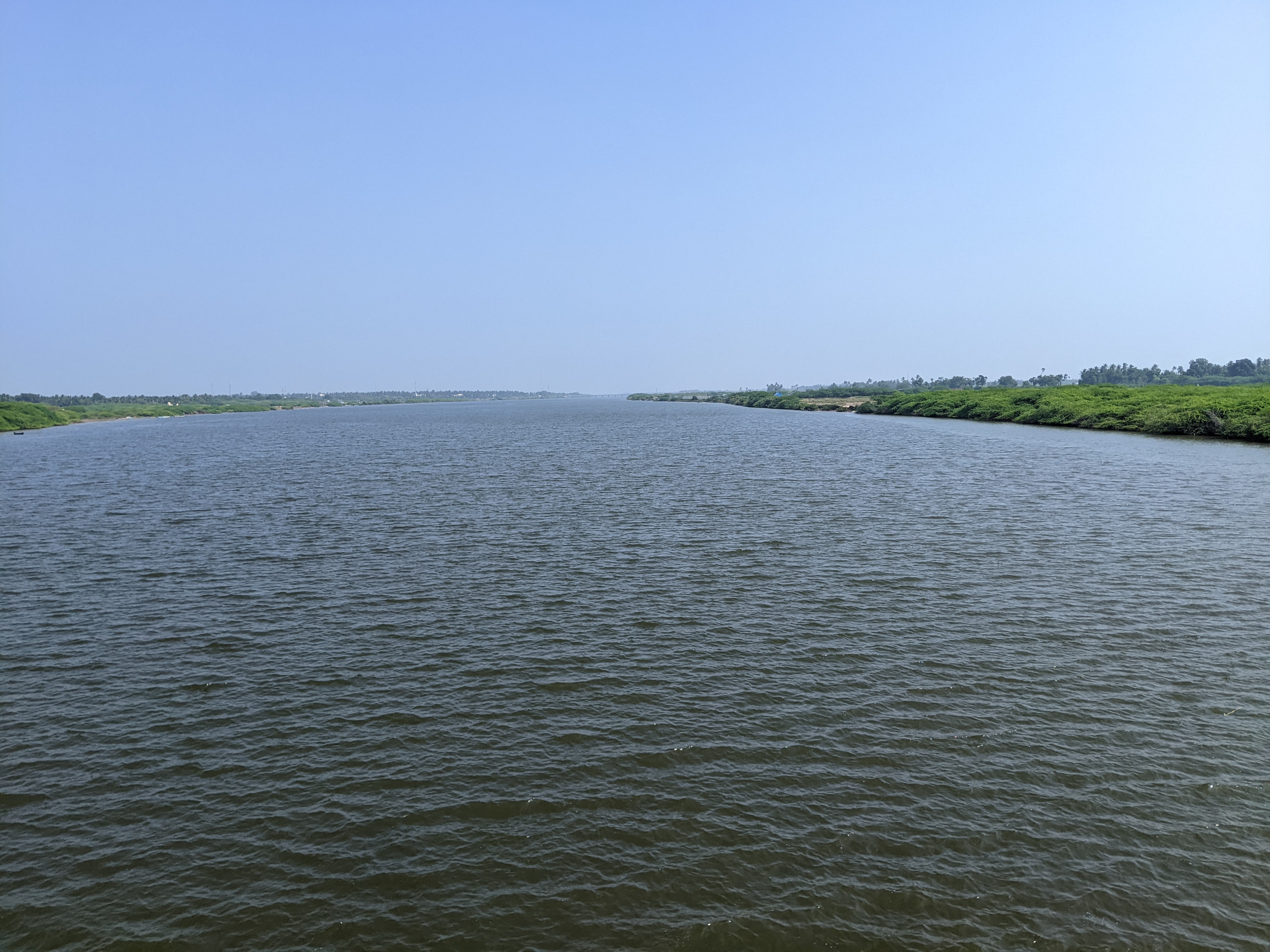
- Vellar River near Parangipettai - December 2021

- Vellar River watershed

- Location of the mouth in Tamil Nadu Vellar River (Northern Tamil Nadu) (India)

Location
- Country: India
- State: Tamil Nadu
- Districts: Salem, Perambalur, Cuddalore

Physical characteristics
- Source: Confluence of Anaimaduvu River and Kallar River
  - location: Ramanathapuram village, Vazhapadi taluk, Salem district
  - coordinates: 11°41′43″N 78°26′14″E
  - elevation: 310 m (1,020 ft)
- Mouth: Bay of Bengal
  - location: Southeast of Parangipettai
  - coordinates: 11°30′12″N 79°46′42″E
  - elevation: 0 m (0 ft)
- Length: 150 km (93 mi)
- Basin size: 7,504.346 km^{2} (2,897.444 sq mi)
- Width
  - maximum: 600 m (2,000 ft)

Basin features
- Population: 3,963,645
- Tributaries
  - left: Manimuktha River
  - right: Periyar River, Manjini River, Ellar River, Swetha River, Chinnar River, Anaivari River
- Waterbodies: Wellington Lake, Anaimuduvu Reservoir, Kariakovil Reservoir, Gomukhi Reservoir, Manimuktha Reservoir

The Vellar River is a river in the Indian state of Tamil Nadu. It originates in the Kalrayan Hills, and flows generally eastward through Salem, Perambalur, and Cuddalore districts, before flowing into the Bay of Bengal near Parangipettai. The river has a total length of 150 kilometres (93 mi), and its drainage basin covers an area of 7,504.346 square kilometres (2,897.444 sq mi) in Cuddalore, Perambalur, Salem, Kallakurichi, Ariyalur, Namakkal, Tiruchirappalli, and Dharmapuri districts.

== History ==
The river was historically important for trade in the Coromandel Coast. Several factories and ports were set up by Europeans at Parangipettai, at the mouth of the river. Settlements were established by the Portuguese, Swedish, and English.

== Course ==
The Vellar River originates at the confluence of the Anaimaduvu and Kallar rivers at (Namagiripettai) Ramanathapuram village in Vazhapadi taluk, Salem district. The Anaimaduvu River originates at the Anaimaduvu reservoir to the north of the confluence, and flows past Belur, while the Kallar River originates to the northeast of the confluence. From its source, the Vellar flows to the southeast within Salem district. It is joined by the Periyar River from the west and on its right bank, at Vaithigoundanpudur village.

The Vellar continues southeast, passing south of Ethapur, northeast of Pethanaickenpalayam, and southwest of Kalpagnur. At Narasingapuram and at Kattukkottai, the Vellar is joined from the southwest and on its right bank by the Chitraru River and Manjini River, respectively. After this confluence, the Vellar flows east through Attur taluk, passing to the south of Attur, until it leaves Salem district near Aragalur.

As it flows out of Salem district, it turns southeast, and defines part of the border between Kallakurichi and Salem districts. It also defines the entirety of Perambular district's northern border, which is with Kallakurichi and Cuddalore districts. South of Velluvadi, the Ellar River joins the Vellar on its right bank and from the west. East of V.Kalathur, the Vellar is again joined on its right bank and from its west by the Swetha River, its second largest tributary. The section of the river before this confluence is sometimes referred to as the Upper Vellar or Vashista Nadhi River, while the section between the confluence and the Vellar's mouth is called the Lower Vellar. After this point the river again flows east, passing to the north of Labbaikudikadu and Ogalur.

The river leaves Perambular district southeast of Tittakudi. Between this location and a meander southeast of Pennadam, the river receives two rivers on its right bank and from the southwest, and defines the border between Cuddalore and Ariyalur districts. It is joined first by the Chinnar River, and then by the Anaivari or Kattodai River. Northeast of Srimushnam the Vellar River is joined by its largest and only left-bank tributary, the Manimuktha River. From here, the river flows east through Cuddalore district. It passes by several towns, including Sethiathoppu and Bhuvanagiri. It flows between Killai and Parangipettai, and into the Bay of Bengal, in Chidambaram taluk, Cuddalore district, where it forms a small bar-built estuary.

== Basin ==
The drainage basin of the Vellar River is one of the 17 major river basins of Tamil Nadu, and covers 7,504.346 square kilometres (2,897.444 sq mi) of land in 8 districts. The basin is bordered by the Kaveri River basin to the south and west, the Ponnaiyar River basin to the north, and the Paravanar River basin and the Bay of Bengal to the east. The basin had a population of 3,963,645 in 2011, resulting in a population density of 528.17994/km^{2} (1,367.97976/sq mi).

The basin is usually divided into seven sub-basins, which correspond to the drainage area of a major tributary within the river system. The seven sub-basins are of the Lower Vellar, Manimuktha, Gomukhi, Upper Vellar, Swetha, Chinnar, and Anaivari rivers. The largest of these sub-basins is that of the Upper Vellar, while the smallest is of the Anaivari. There are 5 major bodies of water, those being the Anamaiduvu, Kariakovil, Gomukhi, and Manimuktha reservoirs, along with Wellington Lake.

=== Land use and geology ===
The majority of land in the basin, about 68%, is used for agriculture. The most commonly grown crops are rice and sugarcane. About 16% of the land is forested, with large areas of reserve forests in the northwest and southwest of the basin. The remaining area is mostly cleared but uncultivated land, part of built-up settlements, or part of a reservoir or lake. Generally, the basin is more flat, cultivated, and level in the east, while it tends to be more hilly and forested to the west and inland.

Deposits of charnockite and fissile hornblende gneiss are the most common geological deposits in the west of the basin. Limestone, magmatite gneiss and deltaic deposits are more common in the east of the basin. Structural hill and valley fill denudational landforms are most common in the west. In the central region and towards the mouth of the river, fluvial landforms and floodplains are more common. The dominant soil types in the basin are inceptisols, vertisols, and alfisols. There is a minor area near the river mouth where entisols are the prevailing type.

== Irrigation and flow ==
The average annual rainfall in the Upper Vellar sub-basin was 846 millimetres (33.3 in), while the average annual rainfall in the Lower Vellar sub-basin was 1,177 millimetres (46.3 in). Rainfall is greatest in both sub-basins during the Northeast and Southwest monsoons, between June and December. Rainfall is greatly reduced during the dry season, between January and May.

The Upper and Lower Vellar irrigate a total area of 424.62 square kilometres (163.95 sq mi) of land for agricultural purposes. There are also demands on the river for water supply from domestic and industrial sources. As a result of the monsoon cycles, the Vellar is non-perennial, and does not flow year-round. The greatly reduced flow during the dry season generally cannot handle water demands from various sources. However, during the wet season, the Vellar does experience flooding issues.

== River modifications ==
Several bridges and dams cross the river along its course. There are three dams, all along the course of the lower section of the Vellar. Those dams are at Tholudur, Pelandurai, and Sethiathoppu. Many road bridges cross the river, along with 4 national highways, those being NH 79, NH 38, NH 36, and NH 32. Additionally, three railroad bridges cross the river.

Modifications have also been made to waterways surrounding the river. Several supply channels divert water from the Vellar to other areas of land or to other bodies of water. One such channel diverts water from the Vellar into Wellington Lake.

== See also ==
- List of rivers of Tamil Nadu
