= Swetha River =

River in India

The Swetha River (Tamil: சுவேதா ஆறு) is a river in India. It carries the drainages of Pachaimalai and Kolli Hills. It joins with Vasishta Nadi to form Vellar River and flows into the Bay of Bengal, emptying near Parangipettai.
