= Ayothiapattinam =

Ayodhyapattinam
- Panchayat town
- Location in Tamil Nadu, India
- Coordinates: 11°40′18″N 78°14′21″E
- Country: India
- State: Tamil Nadu
- District: Salem

Area
  - Total: 9.6 km^{2} (3.7 sq mi)
- Elevation: 328 m (1,076 ft)

Population (2011)
  - Total: 11,517
  - Density: 1,200/km^{2} (3,100/sq mi)

Languages
  - Official: Tamil
- Time zone: UTC+5:30 (IST)

Ayodhyapattinam is a panchayat town in Vazhapadi taluk of Salem district in the Indian state of Tamil Nadu. It is one of the 31 panchayat towns in the district. Spread across an area of 9.6 km^{2} (3.7 sq mi), it had a population of 11,517 individuals as per the 2011 census. The panchayat was named after the city of Ayodhya.

== Etymology ==
The panchayat was named after the city of Ayodhya. The word "Ayodhya" is a regularly formed derivation of the Sanskrit verb yudh, "to fight, to wage war". This meaning is attested by the Atharvaveda, which uses it to refer to the unconquerable city of gods.

== Geography and administration ==
Ayodhyapattinam is located in Vazhapadi taluk of Salem district in the Indian state of Tamil Nadu. Spread across an area of 9.6 km^{2} (3.7 sq mi), it is one of the 31 panchayat towns in the district. The town panchayat is headed by a chairperson, who is elected by the members, who are chosen through direct elections. The town forms part of the Yercaud Assembly constituency that elects its member to the Tamil Nadu legislative assembly and the Salem Lok Sabha constituency that elects its member to the Parliament of India.

== Demographics ==
As per the 2011 census, Ayodhyapattinam had a population of 11,541 individuals across 2,982 households. The population saw a marginal increase compared to the previous census in 2001 when 9,941 inhabitants were registered. The population consisted of 5,726 males and 5,791 females. About 1,002 individuals were below the age of six years. About 12.8% of the population belonged to scheduled castes. The entire population is classified as urban. The town has an average literacy rate of 79%.

About 46.5% of the eligible population were employed, of which majority were involved in agriculture and allied activities. Hinduism was the majority religion which was followed by 97.2% of the population, with Christianity (1.7%) and Islam (0.7%) being minor religions. Kodandaramaswamy Temple is a Hindu temple dedicated to Rama, the seventh avatar of Vishnu. The temple is said to have been consecrated by Bharadvaja and later expanded by the Adhiyaman kings. The Gopura of the temple was built by the Madurai Nayaks. As per Hindu mythology, Rama, while returning from Lanka after defeating Ravana, stayed in the Bharadvaja ashram which was located here along with Sita, Lakshmana and Hanuman. Bharadvaja wanted to see the pattabisheka of Rama and Rama gave a darshan to the Bharadvaja, and he consecrated the idol of Rama.
