= Kamanaicken Palayam =

Kamanaickepalayam
- Town
- Location in Tamil Nadu, India (Kongunadu Region)
- Coordinates: 10.98°N 77.3°E
- Country: India
- State: Tamil Nadu
- Region: Kongu Nadu
- District: Tiruppur
- Metropolitan: Coimbatore
- Established

Population (2011)
  - Total: 12,378
- Time zone: UTC+5:30 (IST)
- Postal code: 641658
- Telephone code: +91-04255
- Vehicle registration: TN-39

Kamanaickenpalayam is a town panchayat in the Tiruppur District in the southern Indian state of Tamil Nadu. There are a total of 15 wards in the Panchayat.

There are more than 15 cotton yarns, weaving mills and looms around the Kamanaickenpalayam camp.

== Administration ==
According to the 2009 district reorganization it will no longer be called a Town Panchayat in the future. In addition, the work of extracting electricity from wind turbines is in progress. The regional head office of the windmill operates here.

== Politics ==
Kamanayakan Palayam is the hometown of AIADMK MLA Thiru Kanagaraj, who won the 2016 assembly elections in Sulur constituency by a margin of 36,000 votes. Currently, Sulur legislator V. P. It is noteworthy that Kandasamy belongs to the same town.

== Facilities ==
The town has

1. Weekly Market here is 98 years old. This weekly market was created during the British rule.
2. Old library. There is also a new library.

== Police Station ==
Kamanaickenpalayam Police Station was inaugurated by Queen Elizabeth II during the British rule.This police station was opened on 15.05.1926. It is the oldest police station in the history of Tamil Nadu Police.

== Transportation ==
It is 28 km from here. The railway station at Tirupur is 38 km away. In the distance is the Coimbatore International Airport. Buses are also available from Kamanaickenpalayam to Pollachi, Thrissur, Guruvayur, Palladam, Tiruppur, Sulur Gobichettipalayam, Coonoor, Coimbatore, Bangalore, Dharmapuri, Hosur, Udumalai, Erode, Salem and city buses. The Tirupur-Pollachi route is served by buses every 5 minutes. Special buses are available for Palani, Anaimalai and Thiruvannamalai on special days.

=== Kamanaickenpalayam Junction ===
The Kamanayakan Palayam junction is the junction of four roads. Pollachi and Kerala State Roads are located through this town. Thus, it is the most important road for thousands of vehicles every day. There are four most important roads from Kamanayakan Palayam to Avinashi via Palladam. one road from Kamanayakan Palayam to Pollachi, one road from Kamanayakan Palayam to Annur and one road from Kamanayakan Palayam to Vavipalayam via Udumalaipettai. This causes occasional traffic congestion on the four-lane road. It is noteworthy that it has now emerged as a city that sees a century past them all.

== Educational Institutions ==
1. Konguraja Primary School
2. Panchayat Union Primary School
3. Government High School
4. Two of the Anganwadi Centers
5. Kamban College of Arts and Sciences
6. Scade College of Technology

== Villages ==
- Thirumandagoundanpalayam
- Vadambacheri

== Other Names ==
- kamanaickenpalayam
- Kamanaickenpalayam
