= Tirumanur =

- Village
- Location in Tamil Nadu, India Tirumanur (India)
- Coordinates: 11°34′37″N 78°19′58″E
- Country: India
- State: Tamil Nadu
- District: Salem
- Taluk: Vazhapadi

Area
  - Total: 11.8 km^{2} (4.6 sq mi)

Population (2011)
  - Total: 5,282
  - Density: 448/km^{2} (1,160/sq mi)
- Time zone: UTC+5:30 (IST)

Tirumanur is a village in the Vazhapadi taluk of Salem district, in Tamil Nadu, India.

== Geography ==
Tirumanur is within Vazhapadi taluk, which is in the central part of Salem district. It covers 11.8 square kilometres (4.6 sq mi) of land in the southwestern part of the taluk, near the border with Namakkal district. It is located 11 kilometres (6.8 mi) southwest of Vazhapadi, the taluk headquarters, 20 kilometres (12 mi) southeast of Salem, the district headquarters, and 270 kilometres (170 mi) southwest of the state capital of Chennai. Tirumanur is situated to the northeast of the Bodhamalai Hills of Namakkal district.

== Demographics ==
In 2011 Tirumanur had a population of 5,282 people living in 1,467 households. 2,616 (49.9%) of the inhabitants were male, while 2,666 (50.1%) were female. 496 children in the town, about 9% of the population, were at or below the age of 6. The literacy rate in the town was 65.2%. Scheduled Castes and Scheduled Tribes accounted for 29.% and 5.6% of the population, respectively.
