= Mattu Pongal =

Tamil festival

Mattu Pongal மாட்டுப் பொங்கல்
- Observed by: Tamil people
- Type: Tamil festival
- Significance: Thanksgiving for cattle and farming livestock
- Celebrations: Feasting
- Date: Second day of the month of Thai in the Tamil calendar

Mattu Pongal is the third day of the four-day Pongal festival. According to the Gregorian calendar it is celebrated on 16 January. Though the name of the festival is specific to Tamil Nadu, it is also celebrated in other southern Indian states such as Andhra Pradesh and Karnataka. Makar Sankranti is a festival that marks the start of northern declination of the Sun from the Zodiac sign of Sagittarius to Capricorn, which according to Tamil calendar usually falls on 14 January.

In Tamil, the word "Mattu" means bull and this day of Pongal is for celebration of cattle, particularly bulls that play a vital role by working hard to help the farmers to raise crops on their fields, falls on the following day, 15 January. The festival is also observed by ethnic Tamil population of Sri Lanka.

The festival day is also a special occasion when the landlord and the peasant, rich and poor, old and young all dine together in a spirit of bonhomie without any restraint of caste and creed. The festival is thus an occasion when the fresh harvests from the fields are shared in the form of food and sweets not only with the community but also with animals and birds. It also represents the change of season.

An important village sport, called the Jallikattu or Manji Virattu, an integral part of the Mattu Pongal festival is observed with enthusiasm and expectations in the villages of Tamil Nadu. This sport is held generally in the evening of the Mattu Pongal day. In the past, it was the day when fierce bulls were chased by the village youth to retrieve the money that was tied to the horns of the bulls. In some villages it was held one day after the Mattu Pongal day, on the Kaanum Pongal day.

== Name and legend ==
Mattu Pongal is made up of two Tamil words; "Mattu", meaning 'bull', and "Pongal", literally meaning 'boiled rice' (a rice and lentil dish) but metaphorically meaning prosperity. The Pongal festival also represents celebration of "fertility and renewal" and is observed either for three days or four-days, after the end of the monsoon season and rice (paddy) crop is harvested.

== Observance ==
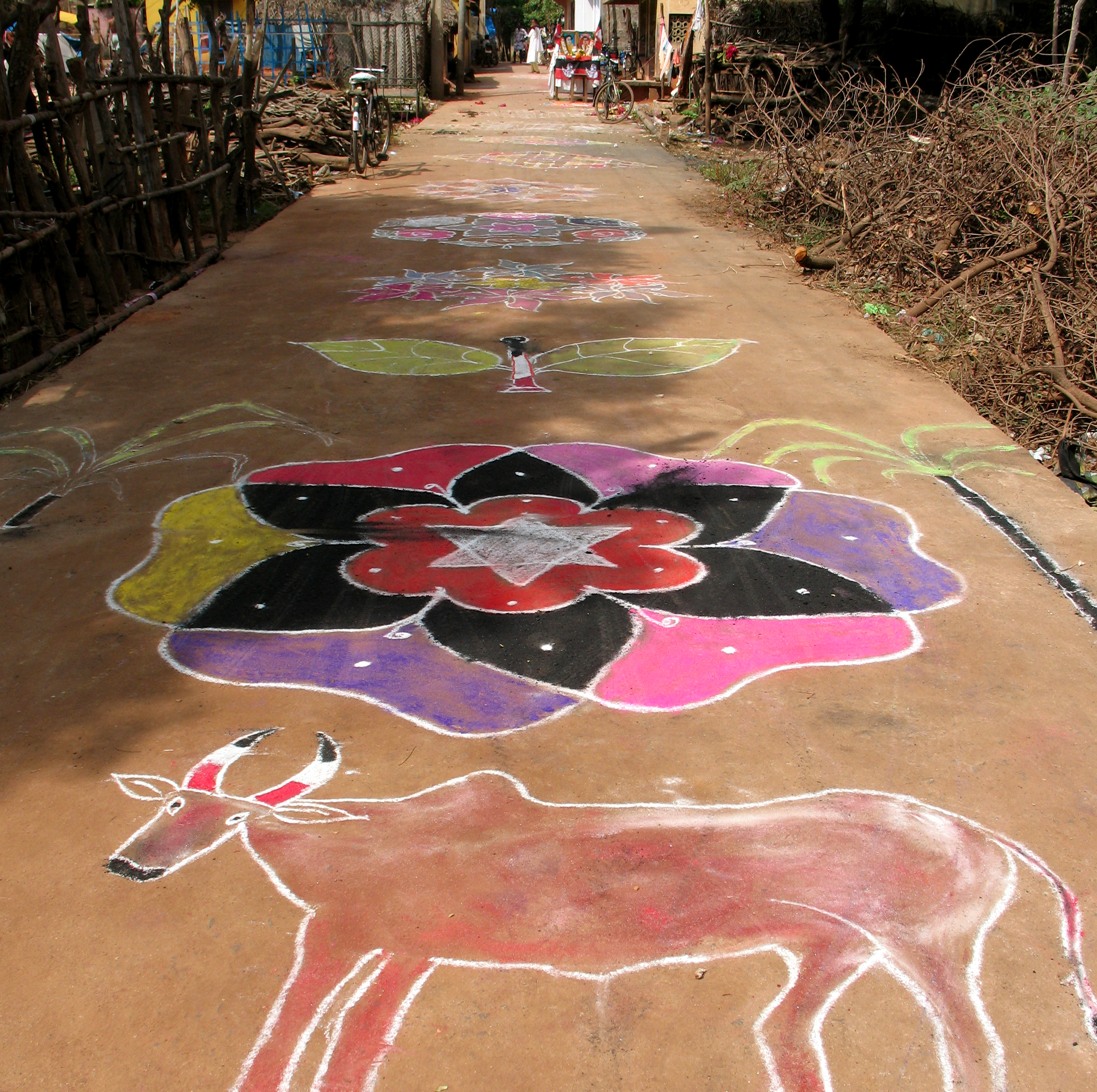
Kolam drawing on Mattu Pongal day

Observance of Mattu Pongal is part of the Pongal festival. Pongal is generally a four-day festival of fervent celebrations (during 2010, it was held from 13 to 16 January) marking the officially declared Tamil New Year day, the beginning of the month of Thai starting with 14 January every year, as per Tamil Calendar. The first day is called Bhogi – the last day of Dhanurmas (month of Sagittarius), a preparatory day before the Pongal and is in honour of god Indra, the king of heaven. On this day it is spring cleaning, as people decorate their homes, buy new vessels and burn old and unwanted items. Pongal, the main festival, also called the Perum Pongal (big festival), is the second day when the Sun is worshipped signifying the first day of the month of Makara or Capricornus. It is celebrated as Makara Sankranti or simply "Sankranti" in the rest of the country. This is followed by the 'Mattu Pongal' celebration on the third day when bulls, cows and other farm animals are worshipped. The fourth day is the 'Kannum Pongal' or 'Kanru Pongal' (Calf Pongal) festival when calves are fed. However, the name 'Kannum' also denotes that on this day people visit elders in the villages or towns seeking their blessings.

On each of the four days festival, Kolam or threshold drawings are drawn with coloured rice powder or chalk powder, in the front yard of the houses, after due washing of the yard. On the first day images of rice are drawn, on the second day good luck signs of Sun are drawn and the Mattu Pongal day Kolam depicts cows also.

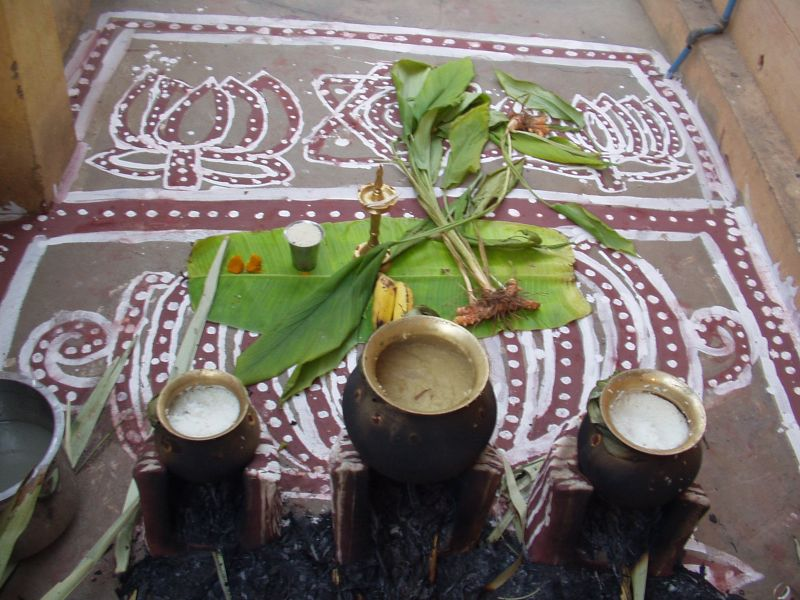
Pongal food offering in pots

On all four days, Shiva's consort Parvati and their son Ganesha are worshipped and the Pongal – the rice preparation – is offered to them in the puja and thereafter to the cattle. The neck of the pot in which Pongal rice is prepared is tied with fresh turmeric leaves and pieces of sugarcane. Ingredients cooked in the pot consist of rice, green gram and milk. While cooking, the overflow of milk is particularly observed as it has significance to the householder. If the milk over flows on the right side of the pot, it is considered an auspicious augury. Sometimes, an image of Ganesha is crafted with cow-dung. This crafted Ganesha is then bedecked with arugampul (kind of grass), thumbai (white flowers) and avaram (yellow flowers). The pongal cooked in mud pots are placed on the floor where a Kolam is drawn and skirted with red sand. Then, pongal-rice along with turmeric, ginger, sugar cane, yellow garlands and a stick that is used to drive the bulls are also placed as offering to Ganesha.

In some practices, Pongal is celebrated for three days with Kannum Pongal or Kannu Pongal observed concurrently with the Mattu Pongal. Sisters symbolically offer small part of the rice dishes prepared for the festival or coloured balls of cooked rice to crows and other birds such as sparrows, as a special prayer for the well-being of their brothers. While making this offering to crows, they call out with words in Tamil, ‘Kakai Ku Pudi, Kuruvi Ku Pudi’, which literally means "this rice ball is for the crow, this rice ball is for the sparrow."

On the Mattu Pongal day, cattle are washed, their horns painted and decorated with shining metal caps. Multi-coloured beads, tinkling bells, sheaves of corn and flower garlands are tied around their necks. Turmeric and kumkum are also devotionally put on the foreheads of the cattle. The cow–keepers dressed in their regale sprinkle the cattle with saffron water with mango leaves with prayers to protect them from evil and shout the popular slogan of the festival, "பொங்கலோ பொங்கல்!" ("Pongaloo Pongal!"). This prayer is a special wish for the progressive prosperity and growth of the cattle population, with the blessings of Indra and Krishna (Gopala), who was a cowherd. Devotees pay their respect to cows by bending down, like praying in a temple, and touching their feet and foreheads, followed by an aarti (showing camphor flame to the object of praise) and offering the cattle prasad (food offering, in this case is called Sakkar Pongal – a delicacy cooked of rice, moong dal (green gram) with jaggery and dry fruits). The cattle are taken in a procession, attended by bands of music, through the village streets to a public space in the village. The resounding of their bells attracts the villagers as the young men race each other's cattle. Then the entire atmosphere becomes festive and full of fun and revelry. Big commotion is seen when the game "Jallikattu" or "Manji Virattu" starts in which groups of young men chase the running bulls.

== Jallikattu ==
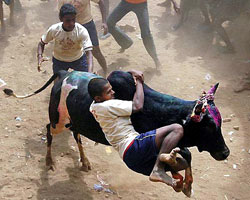
Jallikattu – A bull riding village sport as part of Mattu Pongal celebration

Jallikattu (lit. bull embracing) initially was a bull taming village sport held in the afternoon or evening of the Mattu Pongal celebrations. This sport was popular in the southern part of Tamil Nadu, particularly in Madurai, Tiruchirapalli and Tanjavur. On this day, the bulls, which were worshipped and fed during the day, their horns were tied with bundles of money in the form of coins or notes. The young boys chased such bulls, lassoed them and retrieved the money tied to the horn. If they failed the bulls ran away and were seen only the next morning. But this was a milder form of the sport which was seen in most villages in Tamil Nadu 500 years back. This traditional sport changed during the Nayaka rule in Tamil Nadu From a harmless bull-chasing sport it got transformed into the present form of Jallikattu, which is a bloodier bull-wrestling sport that takes place now in villages throughout Tamil Nadu, to celebrate Mattu Pongal. Jallikattu, as an ancient sport of Tamil Nadu, has been corroborated from rock paintings of 'bull chasing sport' discovered on massive rock surfaces at Karikkiyur in Nilgiris in Tamil Nadu, which are dated between 2,000 B.C. and 1,500 B.C.

The jallikattu events that are held now are in a well organised manner by bull owners and the youthful village men. In the present form, prizes are offered to the bull fighters and the bull owners. The bull fight is held, at a central location in the village where people assemble in large numbers to witness the fight. It is held in an enclosure with a 30 feet (9.1 m) marker. The bulls that are specially trained for this occasion are then led from the pen to the ring to fight, one by one, when young boys of the village grab the bull by its horn or neck or tail and try to hold on to it. If the boys are thrown off or hurt seriously within the ring no prize is given to them. If they hold on or even thrown off but are not in any way injured then the prize is given to them. If the contesting young men hold on to the bull from the marker entrance of the pen then they are given prizes. If the bulls win, then the prizes go to the bull owners. It is said that in some villages as many as 600 bulls, 600 participants and 10,000 spectators participate. The fight between man and the bull is quite fierce and many times bloody. It is considered a heroic act on the part of the young men. The young participants show off their heroism by displaying the number of cuts they have suffered during such fights. This type of fight is said to be akin to the bull fights of Spain. However, in this case, the fight is to win prizes by holding on to the bulls’ neck or horn. The bull is never killed, however many boys get killed by goring by the bull since they fight with their bare hands and with confidence of their strength. In many instances, the audiences watching the fight have also been injured by the ferocious bulls. In recent years, there have been deaths of young boys during this festival, which has created a furore among the public. In one year, there was a report of death of as many as 20 young men, apart from mauling and trampling of spectators.

As result of deaths of young men, the Supreme Court was approached to stop this festival, as it was considered inhuman and dangerous. The plea made was that the Jallikattu was "backward, dangerous, a violation of animals’ rights and detrimental to India's modernizing image." The stoppage of the festival, however, resulted in protests by the villagers who wanted this sport to continue. Finally, on assurances given by the State government that enough security and safety arrangements would be provided at all such sports locations in the villages, Jallikattu has been permitted to be observed as part of the Mattu Pongal festival. As a result of court's intervention, doctors are ready at call to attend to injured young men or boys. A two tier high bamboo fencing is also erected between the bull ring and the audience who come to witness the fight in large numbers.

== Similarities in other religions ==
Studies on similarities in the holding of Hindu seasonal festivals, particularly in South India, which are termed pre-historic, with those of Christianity in Europe, indicate that such similarities may not be coincidental. The winter solstice is the date of Sun entering Capricorn in both the traditions that coincides with Makara Sankranti (called Uttarayana meaning the return of the luminary to the northern region), the first day of the new year starting with the month Magha according to the Hindu Tamil calendar. This corresponds to 21 December per Christian date and is called the sign of the Goat, while the same happens in mid-January according to Hindu calendar. Makara Sankranti is celebrated among the Hindus for three days, with Mattu Pongal (feast of cattle) held the day after Sun entering Capricorn. (There is a slight variation in dates followed for the festival, varying from year to year, but the essence of observing Makara Sankranti is the same among Hindus). Worship of cattle by Hindus during Mattu Pongal has a striking similarity with the Catholic function held on 17 January in Rome as Saint Anthony day, when cattle (the cows, horses, goats, asses and so forth) are blessed. Wilson has allegorically given an analogy:

The time of the year, the decorating of the cattle, the sprinkling of them with water, and the very purport of the blessing, that they may be exempt from evils, are so decidedly Indian, that could a Dravira Brahmin be set down of a sudden in the Piazza, and when he asked what ceremony he witnessed, there can be no doubt of his answer; he would at once declare they were celebrating the Pongal.
