= Avatti =

- Village
- Location in Tamil Nadu, India Avatti (India)
- Coordinates: 11.4166727°N 79.1166607°E
- Country: India
- State: Tamil Nadu
- District: Cuddalore

Government
  - Type: Village
  - Body: Village Panchayat

Languages
  - Official: Tamil
- Time zone: UTC+5:30 (IST)
- Postal code: 606108
- Telephone code: 04143

Avatti is a village panchayat in Cuddalore district in the Indian state of Tamil Nadu. It is located on the National Highway NH-45.

== Economy ==
Agriculture is the main source of income. Most of the young age people work in Singapore. This has uplifted the quality of life in the village. Some of them work in Bangalore or Chennai as engineers.
