= Pongal (festival) =

Tamil Hindu harvest festival

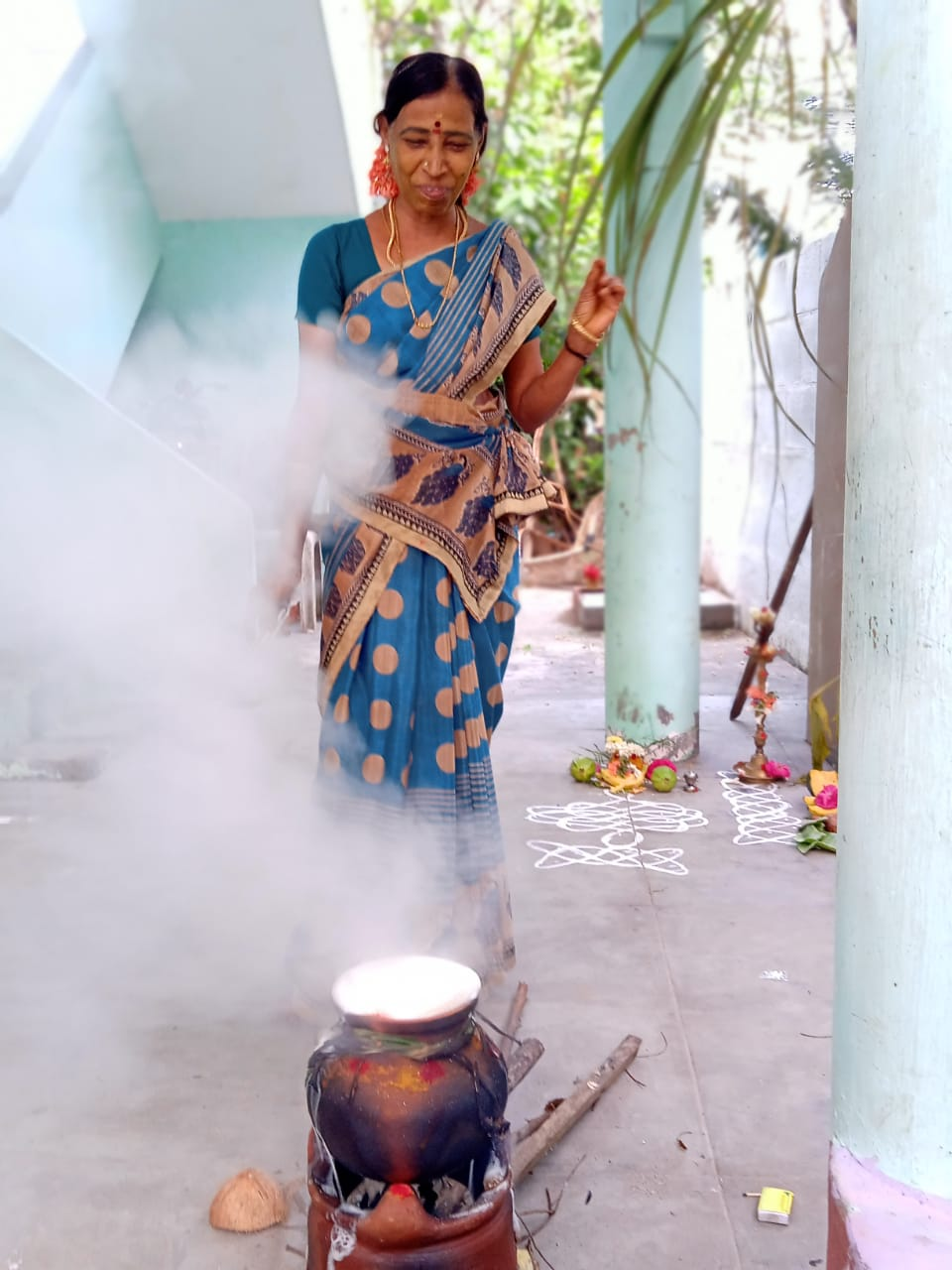
- Pongal dish cooked for the occasion of the festival
- Observed by: Primarily Tamil Hindus in India, Sri Lanka, Malaysia, United States, Indonesia, Mauritius, Singapore, UK, South Africa, Canada, Australia, Gulf countries
- Type: Hindu
- Significance: Harvest festival, Winter Solstice. Worship of the Solar deity for agricultural abundance, and celebration of cattle.
- Celebrations: Preparation of Pongal, decorations, home coming, prayers, processions, gift giving
- Date: Last day of the ninth Tamil calendar month of Margazhi (Bhogi); First day of the tenth month of Thai (Thai Pongal) and next one or two days (Mattu Pongal and Kaanum Pongal)
- 2025 date: 13-16 January
- Frequency: Annual
- Related to: Makar Sankranti, Magh Bihu, Uttarayana, Maghi, Maghe Sankranti, Shakrain

Pongal is a multi-day Hindu harvest festival celebrated by Tamils. The festival is celebrated over three or four consecutive days, which are named Bhogi, Thai Pongal, Mattu Pongal and Kaanum Pongal, beginning on the last day of the Tamil calendar month of Margazhi. Thai Pongal is observed on the first day of the Tamil calendar month of Thai and usually falls on 14 or 15 January in the Gregorian calendar.

According to tradition, the festival marks the end of winter solstice, and the start of the Sun's six-month-long journey northwards called Uttarayana when the Sun enters Capricorn. It is dedicated to the solar deity Surya and corresponds to Makar Sankranti, the Hindu observance celebrated under various regional names across the Indian subcontinent.

The festival is named after the ceremonial "Pongal", which means "boiling over" or "overflow" in Tamil language and refers to the traditional dish prepared by boiling rice with milk and jaggery. Mattu Pongal is meant for celebration of cattle, and the cattle are bathed, their horns polished and painted in bright colors with garlands of flowers placed around their necks and processions on the day. The festival is traditionally an occasion for decorating with rice-powder based kolam artworks, offering prayers at home, visiting temples, getting together with family and friends, and exchanging gifts to renew social bonds of solidarity.

Pongal is also referred to as Tamizhar thirunal ("festival of Tamils") and is one of the major festivals celebrated by the Tamil people across various religions. It is observed by the Tamil diaspora in the Indian state of Tamil Nadu, parts of South India, Sri Lanka and other parts of the world with significant Tamil population.

== Etymology ==
Thai Pongal is a combination of two Tamil language words: Thai (Tamil: 'தை') referring to the tenth month of the Tamil calendar and Pongal (from pongu) meaning "boiling over" or "overflow." Pongal also refers to a sweet dish of rice boiled with milk and jaggery that is ritually prepared and consumed on the day. It is also referred to as Tamizhar thirunal ("the festival of Tamil people").

== History ==
The principal theme of Pongal is thanking the Sun god Surya, the forces of nature, and the farm animals and people who support agriculture. The festival is mentioned in an inscription found at the Veeraraghava Swamy Temple. Attributed to the Chola king Kulottunga I (1070–1122 CE), the inscription describes a grant of land to the temple for celebrating the annual Pongal festivities. The ninth century Shaiva Bhakti text Tiruvempavai by Manikkavacakar details the festival. It appears in Tamil texts and inscriptions with variant spellings such as ponakam, tiruponakam, and ponkal. Temple inscriptions from the Chola and Vijayanagara periods detail recipes similar to pongal recipes of the modern era with variations in seasonings and relative amounts of the ingredients. The terms ponakam, ponkal and its prefixed variants might also indicate the festive pongal dish as a prasadam (religious offering) which were given as a part of the meals served by free community kitchens in South Indian Hindu temples either as festival food or to pilgrims every day.

== Observance ==
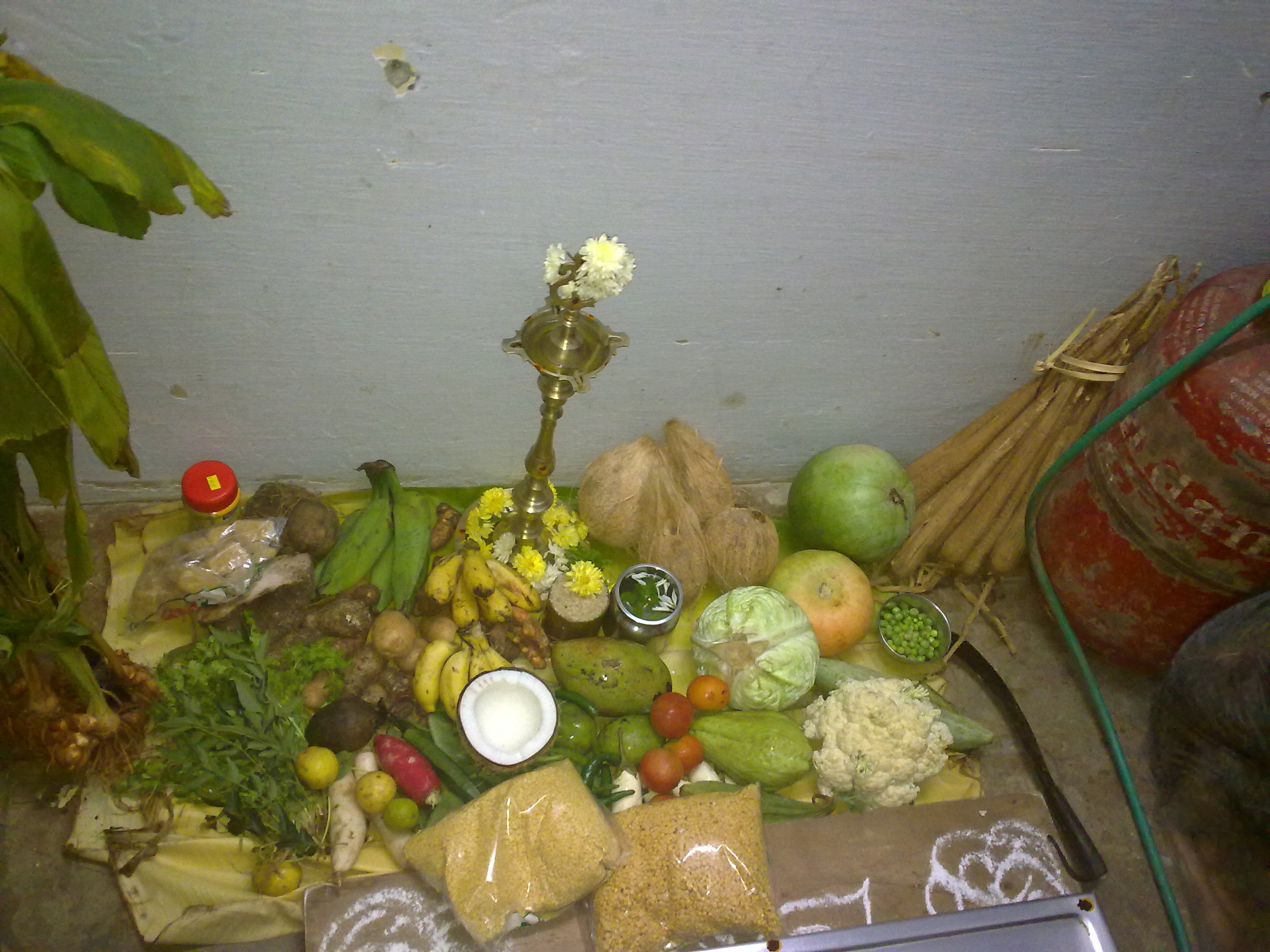
Pongal offering to Gods

Pongal is a multi-day Hindu harvest festival celebrated by Tamils. The three days of the Pongal festival are called Bhogi, Thai Pongal, and Mattu Pongal. Some Tamils celebrate a fourth day of Pongal known as Kanum Pongal. While the festival is observed for three or four days in Tamil Nadu, but for one or two days in urban locations and by the Tamil diaspora outside South Asia.

=== Bhogi ===
Bhogi marks the first day of the Pongal festivities and is celebrated on the last day of the Tamil calendar month Marghazhi. On this day people discard old belongings and celebrate new possessions. The people assemble and light a bonfire in order to burn the heaps of discards. Houses are cleaned, painted and decorated to give a festive look. Prayers are offered to Indra, the king of Gods with thanks and hopes for plentiful rains in the year ahead. Kaappu kattu is a tradition of tying leaves of Azadirachta indica, Senna auriculata and Aerva lanata in the roofs of houses and residential areas that is widely practiced in the Kongu Nadu region. Bhogi is observed on the same day in the South Indian states of Tamil Nadu, Karnataka, Andhra Pradesh and Telangana. Fruits of the harvest are collected along with flowers of the season and a mixture of treats along with money is given to children, who then separate and collect the money and sweet fruits.

=== Thai Pongal ===
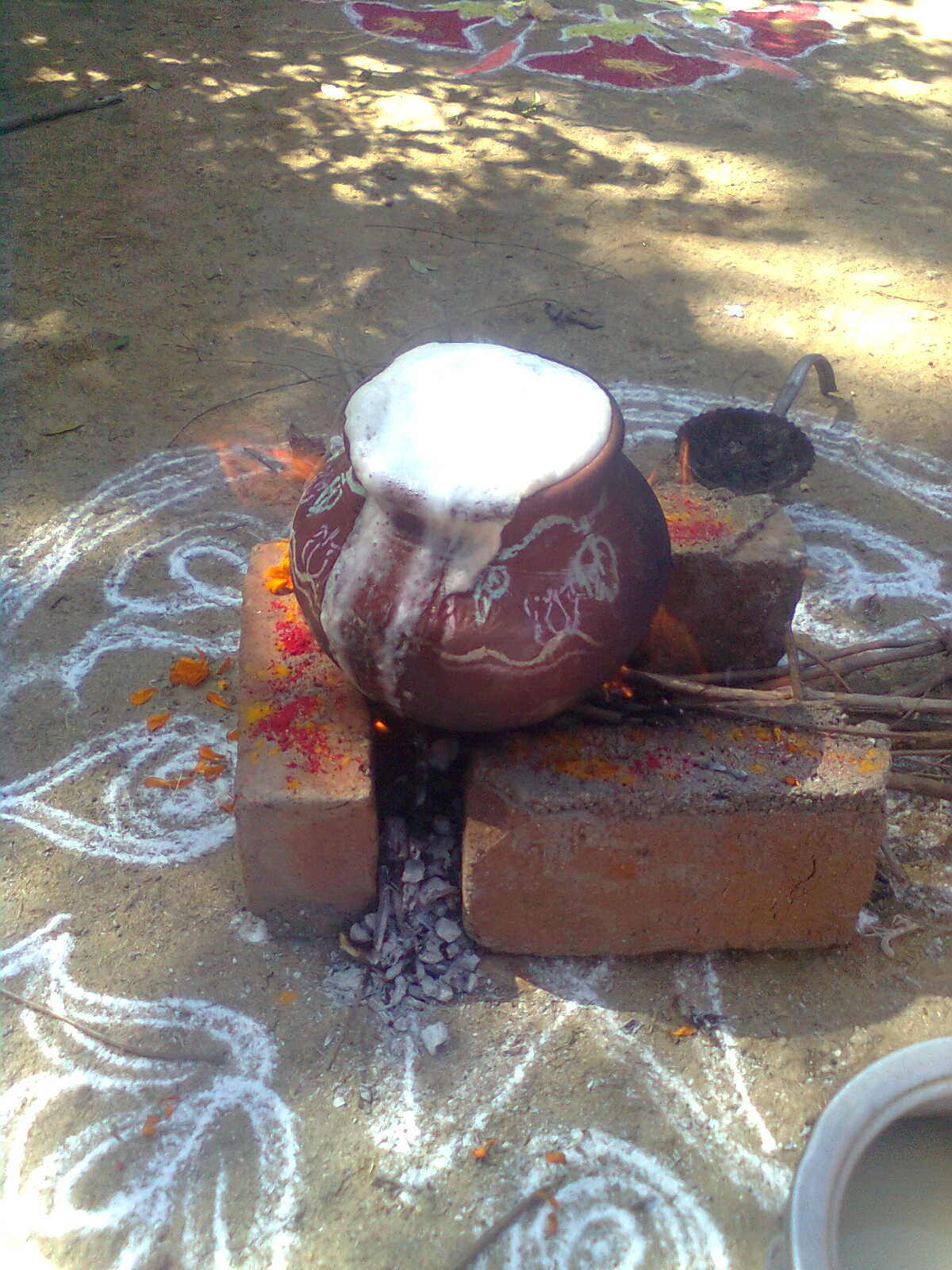
Pongal in earthern pot

Thai Pongal is the main festive day, celebrated on the next day of Bhogi. It is observed on the first day of the Tamil calendar month of Thai, and usually falls on 14 or 15 January as per the Gregorian calendar. It is dedicated to the Sun deity Surya and corresponds to Makar Sankranti, the harvest festival under various regional names celebrated throughout India. According to tradition, the festival marks the end of winter solstice, and the start of the sun's six-month-long journey northwards when the sun enters the Capricorn, also called as Uttarayana.

Dedicated to Surya, it is celebrated with family and friends with new clothes worn and the preparation of the traditional pongal dish in an earthen pot. The pot is typically decorated by tying a turmeric plant or flower garland and placed in the sun along with sugarcane stalks. The homes are decorated with banana and mango leaves, decorative florals and kolams. Relatives and friends are invited and when the pongal starts to boil and overflow out of the vessel, participants blow a conch or make sounds while shouting "Pongalo Pongal" ("may this rice boil over"). In rural areas, people sing traditional songs while the pongal dish is cooking. The Pongal dish is first offered to Surya and Ganesha, and then shared with the gathered friends and family. People traditionally offer prayers to the sun in the open and then proceed to eat their meal. A community Pongal is an event where families gather at a public place for a ceremonial worship.

=== Mattu Pongal ===
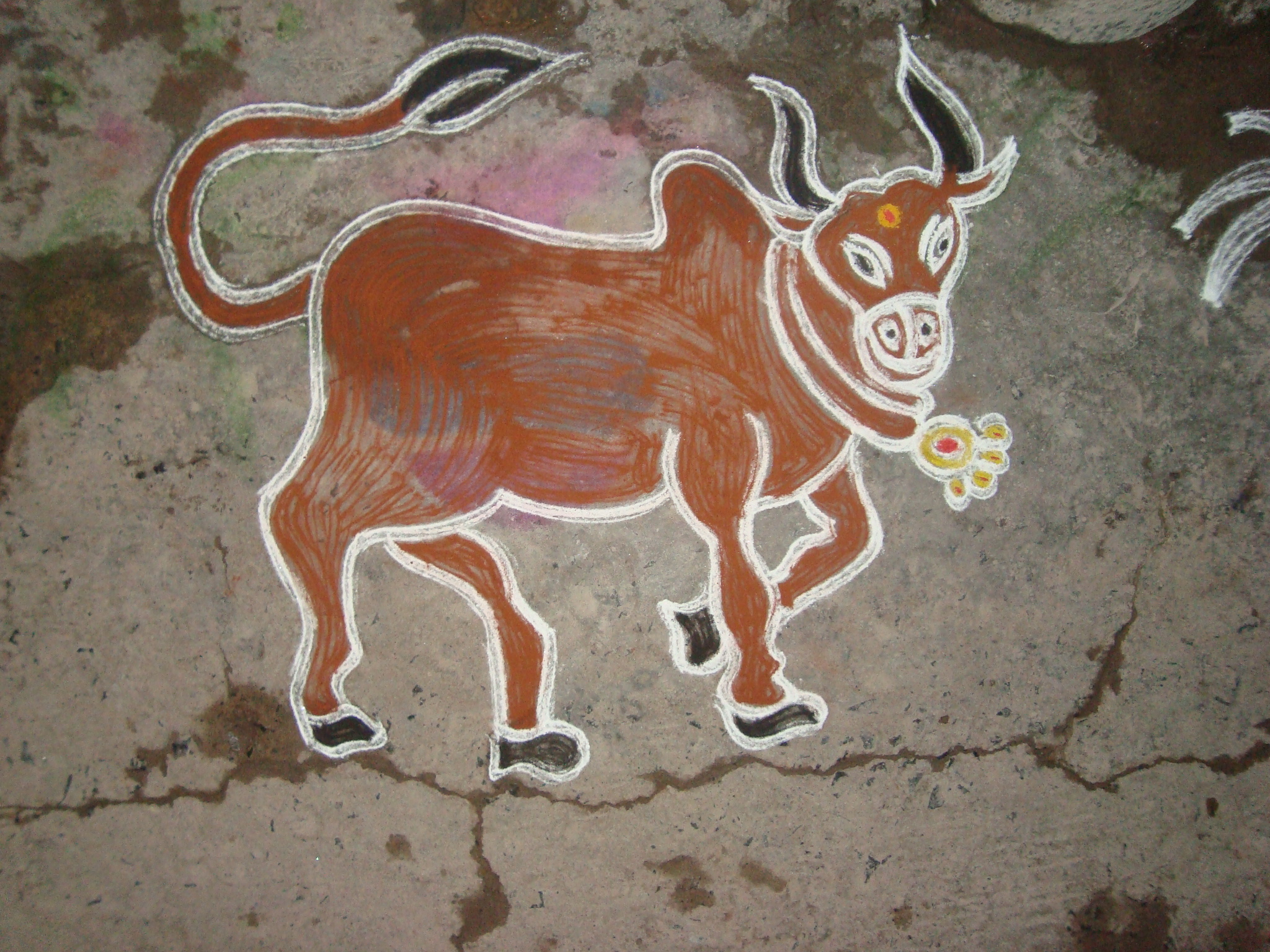
A traditional kolam depicting a cow on Mattu Pongal

Mattu Pongal ("Madu" meaning cow in Tamil) is the third day of the festival meant for the celebration of cattle. The cattle is regarded as sources of wealth as it is a means for dairy products and fertilizers, used for transportation and agriculture. The cattle are bathed, their horns are polished and painted in bright colors with garlands of flowers placed around their necks and taken for processions. Some decorate their cows with turmeric water and apply shikakai and kumkuma to their foreheads. The cattle are fed sweets including pongal, jaggery, honey, banana and other fruits. People may prostrate before them with words of thanks for the help with the harvest.

=== Kanum Pongal ===
Kanum Pongal or Kanu Pongal is the fourth day of the festival and marks the end of Pongal festivities for the year. The word kanum in the context means "to visit" and families hold reunions on this day. Communities organize social events to strengthen mutual bonds and consume food and sugarcane during social gatherings. Young people visit elders to pay respects and seek blessings, with elders giving gifts to the visiting children.

== Traditions and practices ==
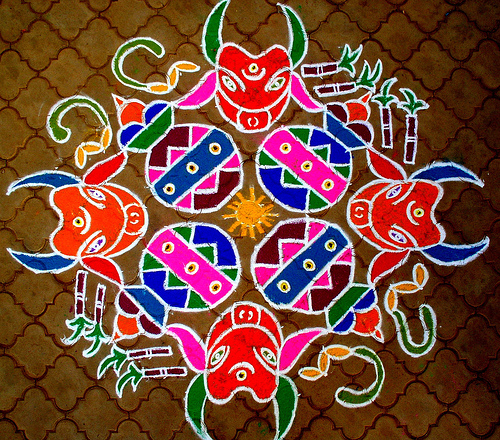
A traditional kolam decoration

Pongal is traditionally an occasion for decorating, offering prayers in the home, temples, getting together with family and friends, and exchanging gifts to renew social bonds of solidarity. It is viewed more as a "social festival" since the contemporary celebrations do not necessarily link it to temple rituals. Temples and cultural centers organize the ritual cooking of Pongal dish, along with fairs (Pongal mela) with handicrafts, crafts, pottery, sarees, ethnic jewelry for sale. These sites hold traditional community sports such as Uri Adithal ("breaking a hanging mud pot while blindfolded"), Pallanguzhi and Kabbadi, as well as group dance and music performances in major cities and towns.

The festival is marked with colorful kolam artwork. Kolam is a form of traditional decorative art that is drawn by using rice flour often along with natural or synthetic color powders. It includes geometrical line drawings composed of straight lines, curves and loops, drawn around a grid pattern of dots.

=== Cuisine ===
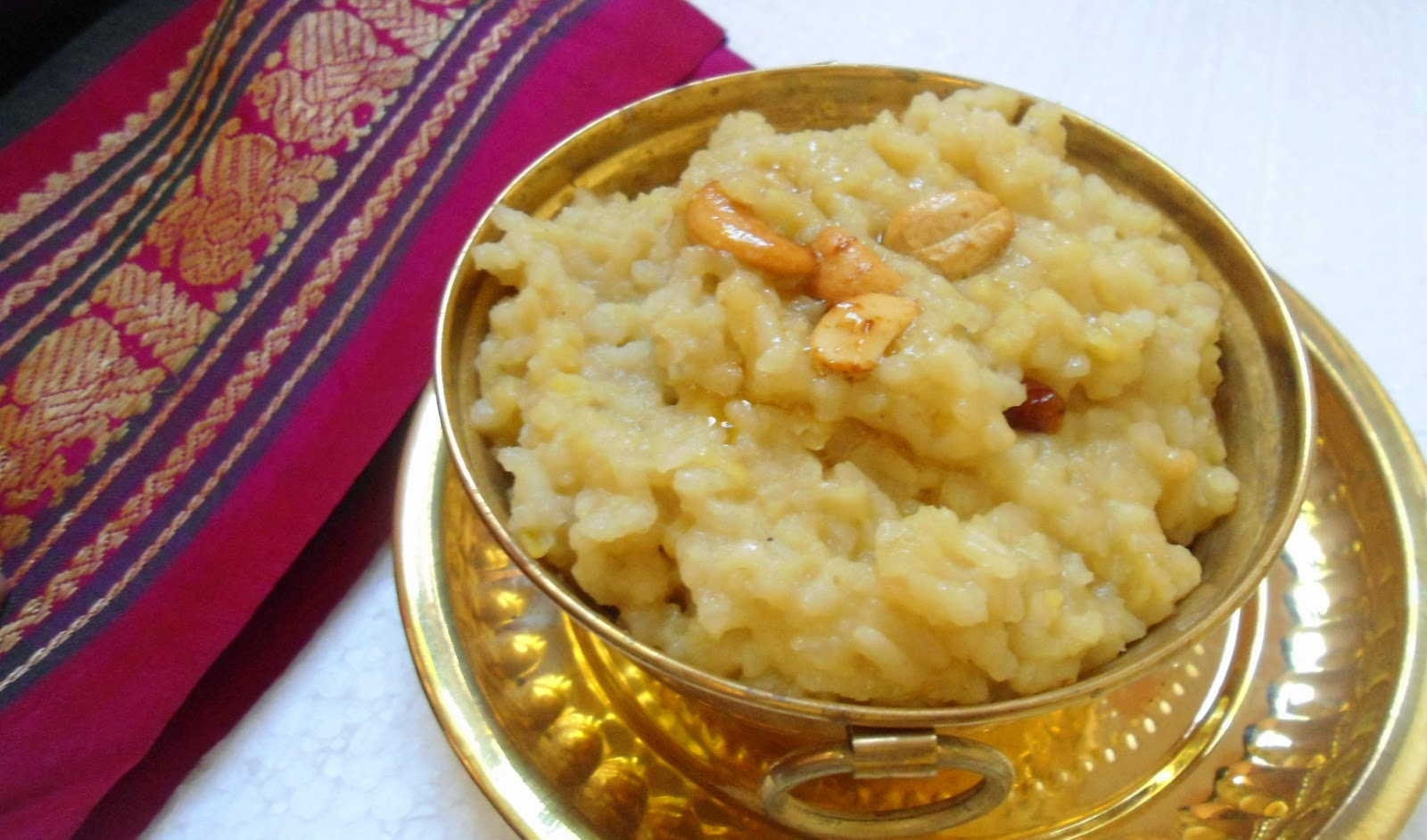
Pongal dish made from rice boiled with cow milk and jaggery

The festival is named after the "Pongal" dish, which forms the festival's most significant practice. The dish is prepared by boiling freshly harvested rice in cow milk and raw cane sugar. Additional ingredients such as coconut and ghee along with spices such as cardamom, raisins and cashews are also used. The cooking is done in a clay pot that is often garlanded with leaves or flowers, sometimes tied with a piece of turmeric root. It is either cooked at home, or in community gatherings such as in temples or village open spaces. The cooking is done in sunlight, usually in a porch or courtyard and the dish is dedicated to the Sun god, Surya. After it is traditionally offered to the gods and goddesses first, followed sometimes by cows, then to friends and family gathered. Temples and communities organize free kitchen prepared by volunteers to all those who gather. Portions of the sweet pongal dish (Sakkarai Pongal) are distributed as the prasadam in temples.

The dish and the process of its preparation is a part of the symbolism, both conceptually and materially. It celebrates the harvest and the cooking symbolizes the transformation of the gift of agriculture into nourishment for the gods and the community on a day that when the sun god is believed to start the journey north. The dish "boiling over" is believed to symbolically mark the blessing by Parvati. It is the ritual dish, along with many other courses prepared from seasonal foods for the gathering.

=== Jallikattu ===
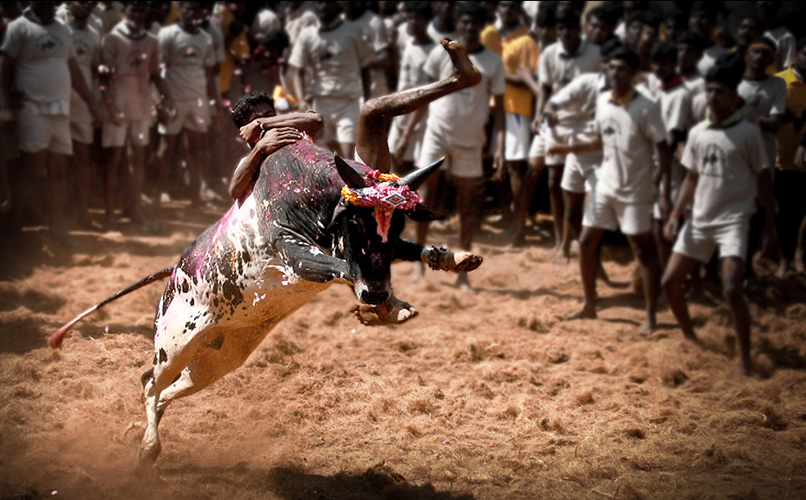
Jallikattu, a traditional bull taming event held during Pongal

The day marks a ritual visit to nearby temples where communities hold processions by parading icons from the sanctum of the temple in wooden chariots, drama-dance performances encouraging social gatherings and renewal of community bonds. Other events during Pongal include community sports and games such as Jallikattu or bull fighting. Jallikattu is a traditional event held during the period attracting huge crowds in which a bull is released into a crowd of people, and multiple human participants attempt to grab the large hump on the bull's back with both arms and hang on to it while the bull attempts to escape. Kanu Pidi is a tradition observed on Mattu Pongal by women and young girls where they place a leaf of turmeric plant outside their home, and feed pongal dish and food to the birds, particularly crow and pray for their brothers' well being. Brothers pay special tribute to their married sisters by giving gifts as affirmation of their filial love.

== Contemporary practices ==
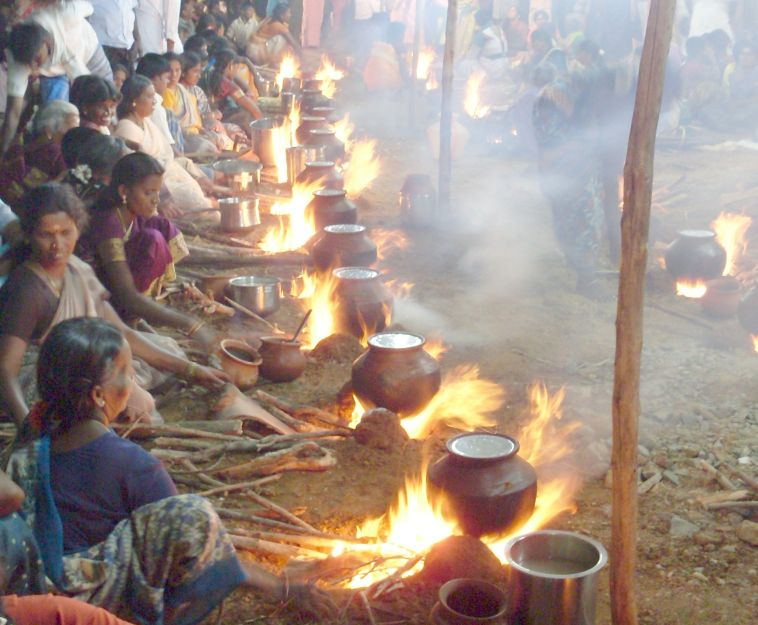
Pongal in a community gathering

Pongal is observed by Tamil community in Kerala, and it is a local holiday in Idukki, Palakkad, Pathanamthitta, Thiruvananthapuram, and Wayanad districts. In Attukal Temple near Thiruvanathapuram, Attukal Pongala is celebrated in the month of February–March. This similarly named celebration of Pongala includes dance (Kathakali) and musical performances, and processions featuring the temple goddess.

In Karnataka, the festival is celebrated over several days similar to Pongal, and the dish prepared is called "ellu". Decorations and social visits are common during the festivities. Pongal festivities coincide with Makara Sankranthi, Maghi and Bihu celebrated across various parts of India.

=== Sri Lanka ===
In Sri Lanka, Pongal is celebrated by the Sri Lankan Tamils and the Pongal festivities last two days, essentially focused on Thai Pongal day. The custom of cooking Pukkai, a dish similar to Pongal, and made of red rice, mung beans and milk, is carried out on the first day.

== Geography ==
Pongal is one of the major festivals celebrated by Tamil people across various religions in Tamil Nadu. It is also celebrated in other parts of South India, and is a major Tamil festival in Sri Lanka. It is observed by the Tamil diaspora worldwide, including those in Malaysia, Mauritius, South Africa, Singapore, United States, United Kingdom, Canada, and the Gulf countries. In 2017, Delegate David Bulova introduced a joint resolution HJ573 in the Virginia House of Delegates to designate January 14 of each year as Pongal Day.

== See also ==
- List of Harvest Festivals
