= Kaanum Pongal =

Fourth day of the tamil festival Pongal

Kaanum Pongal காணும் பொங்கல்
- Observed by: Tamil people
- Type: Tamil festival
- Significance: Thanksgiving for cattle, ancestors and farming livestock, visiting relatives houses
- Celebrations: Feasting
- Date: Third day of the month of Thai in the Tamil calendar

Kaanum Pongal or Kanum Pongal (Tamil: காணும் பொங்கல்) is the fourth and the final day of the four-day Pongal festival. It is observed in the month of Thai according to the Tamil calendar and usually falls on 16 or 17 January. Though the name of the festival is specific to Tamil Nadu, it is also celebrated in other southern Indian states such as Andhra Pradesh and Karnataka as the festival is significantly popular in South India. The day of Kaanum Pongal is often acknowledged as the Thiruvalluvar Day in remembrance of the historic Tamil writer, poet and philosopher Thiruvalluvar who was known for writing the world famous Thirukural. The day is also popularly treated as the sightseeing day as well as the Thanksgiving day. People believe Kaanum Pongal is an auspicious day to arrange marriage proposals and to kick start new bonds and relationships.

== Naming and celebrations ==
The word Kaanum means 'viewing and seeing'. Kaanum Pongal is the day of relaxation and enjoyment as it implies that people spend their time by arranging family trips, picnics, visiting neighbours and relatives houses. In the state of Andhra Pradesh, the festival is earmarked and celebrated as Mukkanuma and the auspicious festival is observed in Andhra by worshipping the cattle. In the state of Tamil Nadu, the day of Kanum Pongal is also referred to as Virgin Pongal or Kanni Pongal, the word Kanni implies virgin/maiden/unmarried girl. Unmarried girls celebrate the festival by playing in the water at the river banks and pray the god to have a very successful matrimonial life. Kanni Pongal is celebrated coinciding Kaanum Pongal for the wellbeing of unmarried women and for the fertility.

Women offer special prayers to the Sun god for the wellbeing of their brothers and traditionally visit their brothers' homes.
