= Chidambaram taluk =

Taluk of Cuddalore district, Tamil Nadu, India

Coordinates: 11.4°N 79.7°E

Chidambaram taluk is a taluk of Cuddalore district of the Indian state of Tamil Nadu. The headquarters of the taluk is the town of Chidambaram.Chidambaram is one of the many temple towns in the state which is named after the grooves, clusters or forests dominated by a particular variety of a tree or shrub and the same variety of tree or shrub sheltering the presiding deity. The town used to be called Thillai, following Thillaivanam, derived from the mangrove of Tillai trees (Exocoeria agallocha) that grow here and the nearby Pichavaram wetlands.

The site became the capital of Cholas in the 10th century, and they renamed it to Chidambaram and built the current temple for their family deity of Nataraja Shiva. The word Chidambaram comes from the Tamil word Chitrambalam (also spelled Chithambalam) meaning "wisdom atmosphere". The roots are citt or chitthu, meaning, "consciousness or wisdom", and ampalam, meaning "atmosphere". This composite word comes from its association with Shiva Nataraja, the cosmic dancer and the cultural atmosphere for arts.The word Chidambaram is translated by James Lochtefeld as "clothed in thought".

== Demographics ==
According to the 2011 census, the taluk of Chidambaram had a population of 469,416 with 236,170 males and 233,246 females. There were 988 women for every 1,000 men. The taluk had a literacy rate of 75.15%. Child population in the age group below 6 was 23,599 Males and 21,446 Females.
