= Tittakudi taluk =

Titakudi taluk is a taluk of Cuddalore district of the Indian state of Tamil Nadu. The headquarters of the taluk is the town of Tittakudi.

== Demographics ==
According to the 2011 census, the taluk of Tittakudi had a population of 2,62,289 with 1,321,390 males and 1,329,899 females. There were 987 women for every 1000 men. The taluk had a literacy rate of 63.41. Child population in the age group below 6 was 146,042 Males and 127,390 Females.
