= Belur, Tamil Nadu =

Belur
- Panchayat town
- Location in Tamil Nadu, India
- Coordinates: 11°42′28.4″N 78°24′46.4″E
- Country: India
- State: Tamil Nadu
- District: Salem

Area
  - Total: 6.8 km^{2} (2.6 sq mi)

Population (2011)
  - Total: 8,736
  - Density: 1,300/km^{2} (3,300/sq mi)

Languages
  - Official: Tamil
- Time zone: UTC+5:30 (IST)

Belur is a panchayat town in Vazhapadi taluk of Salem district in the Indian state of Tamil Nadu. It is one of the 31 panchayat towns in the district. Spread across an area of 6.8 km^{2} (2.6 sq mi), it had a population of 8,736 individuals as per the 2011 census.

== Geography and administration ==
Belur is located in Vazhapadi taluk of Salem district in the Indian state of Tamil Nadu. Spread across an area of 6.8 km^{2} (2.6 sq mi), it is located 40 km (25 mi) from Salem. It is one of the 31 panchayat towns in the district. The town panchayat is sub-divided into 15 wards. It is headed by a chairperson, who is elected by the members, who are chosen through direct elections. The town forms part of the Yercaud Assembly constituency that elects its member to the Tamil Nadu legislative assembly and the Kallakurichi Lok Sabha constituency that elects its member to the Parliament of India.

== Demographics ==
As per the 2011 census, Belur had a population of 8,736 individuals across 2,290 households. The population saw a marginal decrease compared to the previous census in 2001 when 9,012 inhabitants were registered. The population consisted of 4,367 males and 4,369 females. About 875 individuals were below the age of six years. About 23.7% of the population belonged to scheduled castes. The entire population is classified as urban. The town has an average literacy rate of 78.8%.

About 42.8% of the eligible population were employed, of which majority were involved in agriculture and allied activities. Hinduism was the majority religion which was followed by 87.1% of the population, with Islam (12.4%) and Christianity (0.5%) being minor religions.
