= Vazhapadi taluk =

- Taluk in Salem district
- Country: India
- State: Tamil Nadu
- Region: Kongu Nadu
- District: Salem
- Headquarters: Vazhapadi

Population (2011)
  - Total: 195,415

Languages
  - Official: Tamil
- Time zone: UTC+5:30 (IST)

Vazhapadi taluk is one of the thirteen taluks of Salem district in the Indian state of Tamil Nadu. The headquarters of the taluk is the town of Vazhapadi.

== Administration ==
Vazhapadi taluk is divided into two revenue blocks, Valapady block and Ayothiapattinam block. Valapady block is composed of the eastern half of the taluk and parts of Peddanayakkan Palayam taluk, while Ayothiapattinam block includes the western half of the taluk and some parts of Salem taluk.

=== Towns ===
There are three town panchayats and one census town in Vazhapadi taluk. Masinaickenpatti is the only census town, while Ayothiapattinam, Belur, and Vazhapadi are the three town panchayats.

== Geography ==
Vazhapadi taluk is in the central part of Salem district, and is bordered by Dharmapuri district to the north, Peddanayakkan Palayam taluk to the east, Namakkal district to the south, and Salem taluk to the west. A singular railway line runs east–west in the central part of the taluk, running through Ayothiapattinam and Vazhapadi. National Highway 79 also runs through the district and follows a similar course. There are several reserve forests in the taluk, concentrated mainly in the north, in the Kalrayan Hills. Rivers in the taluk include the Anaimuduvu River, the Periyar River, and its tributary, the Singipuram River.

== Demographics ==
In 2011, Vazhapadi taluk had a population of 195,415 people. 98,674 (50.49%) of the inhabitants were male, while 96,741 (49.51%) were female. 18,795 children in the taluk were at or below the age of 6, of which 9,723 (51.7%) were male and 9,072 (48.3%) were female. This age group made up about 9.6% of the population. 66.4% of the population was literate.

== See also ==
- List of villages in Vazhapadi taluk
- Thamayanoor
