= Tittakudi =

- Municipality
- Location in Tamil Nadu, India
- Coordinates: 11.416667°N 79.116667°E
- Country: India
- State: Tamil Nadu
- District: Cuddalore

Government
  - Chairman: .

Area
  - Total: 60 km^{2} (23 sq mi)

Population (2001)
  - Total: 20,734
  - Density: 350/km^{2} (900/sq mi)

Languages
  - Official: Tamil
- Time zone: UTC+5:30 (IST)
- PIN -->: 606106
- Vehicle registration: TN-91( TN-31 till Jun17,2015)

Tittakudi is a Municipality and taluk headquarters in Cuddalore district in the Indian state of Tamil Nadu. Tittakudi itself is the Tittakudi Member of Assembly Constituency. Tittakudi is the reserved Constituency.

It is the part of Cuddalore Lok Sabha Constituency. It is located at a distance of 248 km from Chennai and 33 km from Virudachalam.

== Demographics ==
As of 2001 India census, Tittakudi had a population of 20,734. Males constituted 51% of the population and females 49%. Tittakudi has an average literacy rate of 67%, higher than the national average of 59.5%: male literacy was 77%, and female literacy was 57%. In Tittakudi, 11% of the population was under 6 years of age.
