= Vazhapadi =

- Panchayat town
- Location in Tamil Nadu, India
- Coordinates: 11°39′22″N 78°24′06″E
- Country: India
- State: Tamil Nadu
- District: Salem

Area
  - Total: 8 km^{2} (3.1 sq mi)

Population (2011)
  - Total: 17,559
  - Density: 2,200/km^{2} (5,700/sq mi)

Languages
  - Official: Tamil
- Time zone: UTC+5:30 (IST)

Vazhapadi is a panchayat town in Salem district in the Indian state of Tamil Nadu. It is one of the 31 panchayat towns in the district, and is the administrative headquarters of in Vazhapadi taluk. Spread across an area of 8 km^{2} (3.1 sq mi), it had a population of 17,559 individuals as per the 2011 census.

== Geography and administration ==
Vazhapadi is located in Salem district in the Indian state of Tamil Nadu. It is one of the 31 panchayat towns in the district, and is the administrative headquarters of in Vazhapadi taluk. It is spread across an area of 8 km^{2} (3.1 sq mi). The town panchayat is headed by a chairperson, who is elected by the members, who are chosen through direct elections. The town forms part of the Veerapandi Assembly constituency that elects its member to the Tamil Nadu legislative assembly and the Salem Lok Sabha constituency that elects its member to the Parliament of India.

== Demographics ==
As per the 2011 census, Vazhapadi had a population of 17,559 individuals across 4,582 households. The population saw a marginal increase compared to the previous census in 2001 when 16,104 inhabitants were registered. The population consisted of 8,843 males and 8,716 females. About 1,679 individuals were below the age of six years. About 26.4% of the population belonged to scheduled castes. The entire population is classified as urban. The town has an average literacy rate of 82.3%.

About 41.6% of the eligible population were employed full-time, of which majority were involved in agriculture and allied activities. Hinduism was the majority religion which was followed by 95.4% of the population, with Islam (2.6%) and Christianity (1.9%) being minor religions.
