= Panapakkam, Cuddalore =

Panapakkam
- Village
- Nickname: PPM
- Location in Tamil Nadu, India Panapakkam (India)
- Coordinates: 11°48′33″N 79°32′10″E
- Country: India
- State: Tamil Nadu
- District: Cuddalore

Government
  - Type: Democracy
  - Body: Village Panjayat

Population (2011)
  - Total: 3,122

Languages
  - Official: Tamil
- Time zone: UTC+5:30 (IST)
- PIN: 607108
- Telephone code: 04142
- Vehicle registration: TN-31

Panapakkam Village (607108) is a village panchayat in Panruti Taluk of Cuddalore District of Tamil Nadu, India.

The 2011 Census of India determined that there were 3122 residents, 1568 male and 1554 female, in 650 households.

Agriculture is the major occupation, along with dairy farming. Sugarcane, tapioca, casuarina, paddy, guava (L49 variety), coconut, Borassus (palmyra palm), mango, maize corn, Eleusine coracana (Ragi), and Moringa oleifera (drumstick tree) are some of the crops cultivated here. As per a 1972 revenue survey, the village has a total land area of 470 hectares and 17 ares. The major source of water is ground water through bore wells; there are also many ponds and a major lake (55 acres), part of which is under the Tamil Nadu Forest Department.

The village is under the Pudupet/Puthupet Post Office jurisdiction.

A nearby main bus stand and railway station (PRT) are in Panruti, whilst Thiruthuraiyur (TUY) railway station is the nearest station where some passenger trains stop in Villupuram as well as Cuddalore routes of mainline.

Tamil and Telugu are the common languages here, with Tamil speakers being in the majority.

A road connecting Panapakkam to Pudupettai, Thorapadi was laid in August 2025 and is in good condition. A village road connecting Panapakkam with nearby Kanisapakkam was laid sometime in 2018/19 and is now in bad shape. A road to Varinjipakkam is also in good shape. The one connecting Panapakkam-VKT NH road is somehow better, with very few potholes. Most of the streets have cement road facility as well. Major transportation consists of private vehicles, and a minibus service to Panruti operates throughout the day. Panruti, Cuddalore, Villupuram, Pondicherry, and Neyveli are the nearest towns. The villages of Kanisapakkam and Panapakkam are managed by same VAO.

Thirukameswaran (திருக்காமேஸ்வரர் கோயில்) temple is a famous Shiva temple here. Kaniswarar temple is another nearby famous temple.

This village was electrified in 1960.

== See also ==
- Panapakkam, Vellore district, Tamil Nadu
