= Annagramam block =

Annagramam block is a revenue block of Cuddalore district of the Indian state of Tamil Nadu. This revenue block consist of 42 panchayat villages.

== List of Panchayat Villages ==
They are,

SI.No	Panchayat Village
1	A.P.Kuppam
2	Agaram
3	Akkadavalli
4	Aviyanur
5	Bandrakottai
6	Chinnapettai
7	Chitharasur
8	Eaithanur
9	Enathirimangalam
10	Ezhumedu
11	Kallipattu
12	Kandrakottai
13	Kanisapakkam
14	Karumbur
15	Kavanoor
16	Keelarungunam
17	Keelkavarapattu
18	Kongarayanur
19	Korathi
20	Kotlampakkam
21	Kozhipakkam
22	M.K.Mangalam
23	Maligaimedu
24	Melkavarapattu
25	Narimedu
26	K.A.Natham
27	Oraiyur
28	P.N.Palayam
29	P.V.Natham
30	Pagandai
31	Paithampadi
32	Palur
33	Panapakkam
34	Poondi
35	Pulavanur
36	Sanniyasipettai
37	Sathipattu
38	Sundaravandi
39	Thattampalayam
40	Thirasu
41	Thiruthuraiyur
42	Varinjipakkam
