= List of educational institutions in Cuddalore district =

The following is a list of educational institutions in Cuddalore District

== Secondary schools ==
- Akshara Vidyaashram, Unnamalai chetty Chavadi, Kondur.
- A.R.L.M Matriculation Higher Secondary School, Cuddalore
- Balavihar Matriculation Higher Secondary School, Panruti
- CK School of Practical Knowledge, Anna Nagar, Cuddalore
- Dhava Amudham Matriculation Higher Secondary School, Srimushnam
- Infant Matriculation Higher Secondary School, Vriddhachalam
- G V School, Chidambaram
- John Dewey Matriculation Higher Secondary School, Panruti
- Krishnaswamy Memorial Matriculation Higher Secondary School, Cuddalore
- Kamatchi Shanmugam Matriculation Higher Secondary School, Cuddalore
- Isha Vidhya Matriculation School, Madavapallam, Samiyarpettai PO.
- Jawahar Higher Secondary School, Neyveli.
- Kendriya Vidyalaya- KV Neyveli, Neyveli TS.
- Krishnaswamy Vidyanikethan, S Kumarapuram, Cuddalore.
- KSR Hi-tech School, Budhamoor, Virudhachalam.
- Lakshmi Chordia Memorial Matric Higher Secondary School, SR Nagar, Cuddalore 2.
- Mahatma Gandhi International School, Reddychavady.
- Nirmala Matriculation Higher Secondary School, Kanagasabai nagar, Chidambaram.
- Savior Jesus Matriculation Higher Secondary School, Cuddalore.
- Seventh Day Adventist School, Neyveli Thermal Bus stand.
- Shemford Futuristic School, Perumal street, Chidambaram.
- Sri Valliammal School for Knowledge and Wisdom, Kesava nagar, Cuddalore.
- St. Annes Girls Higher Secondary School, Manjakuppam, Cuddalore.
- St. Anne's College of Engineering and Technology, Panruti Taluk, Cuddalore
- St. Joseph's Higher Secondary School NT, Manjakuppam, Cuddalore
- St. Joseph's Higher Secondary School, Cumming Pet, Thirupapuliyur, Cuddalore
- St. Mary's Matriculation Higher Secondary School, Cuddalore
- St. Paul Matriculation Higher Secondary School, Neyveli.
- Indian Matriculation Higher Secondary School, Tittagudi
- Sri Gnanaguru Vidyalayaa Matriculation Higher Secondary School, Tittagudi
- Danish Mission Higher Secondary School, Viruddhachalam
- Government Boys Higher Secondary School, Viruddhachalam
- Government Girls Higher Secondary School, Viruddhachalam
- Government Higher Secondary School, Puthupet
- Kalaimagal Matric Higher Secondary School, kattumannar koil

== Medical Colleges ==
- Rajah Muthiah Medical College, Annamalai university, Chidambaram

== Engineering Colleges ==
- Dr. Navalar Nedunchezhiyan College of Engineering, Thozhudur, Cuddalore
- University College of Engineering, Panruti
- St Anne's college of engineering, Panruti
- CK College of Engineering & Technology, Chellankuppam, Cuddalore
- Krishnasamy College of Engineering & Technology, S.Kumarapuram, Cuddalore
- MRK Institute of Technology

== Universities ==
- Annamalai University
- Anna University
