= Panruti block =

Coordinates: 11.77°N 79.55°E

Panruti block is a revenue block of Cuddalore district of the Indian state of Tamil Nadu. This revenue block consist of 42 panchayat villages.

== List of Panchayat Villages ==
SI.No	Panchayat Village
1	Alagappasamuthiram
2	Anguchettipalayam
3	Arasadikuppam
4	Ealanthampattu
5	Kadampuliyur
6	Karukkai
7	Kattukudalur
8	Keelakuppam
9	Keeliruppu
10	Keelkangeyankuppam
11	Keelmampattu
12	Kolapakkam
13	Kudumiyankuppam
14	Lakshmi Narayanapuram
15	Maligampattu
16	Manamthavilnthaputhur
17	Manapakkam
18	Marungur
19	Meliruppu
20	Melkangeyankuppam
21	Melmampattu
22	Nadukuppam
23	Natham
24	Pannikankuppam
25	Periyakattupalayam
26	Perperiyankuppam
27	Poongunam
28	Purangani
29	Rayarpalayam
30	Semakottai
31	Semmedu
32	Silambinathanpet
33	Sirugramam
34	Siruvathur
35	Sorathur
36	Thalampattu
37	Thiruvamoor
38	Vallam
39	Veeraperumanallur
40	Veerasingankuppam
41	Vegakollai
42	Visoor
