= Panruti =

- Town
- Panruti
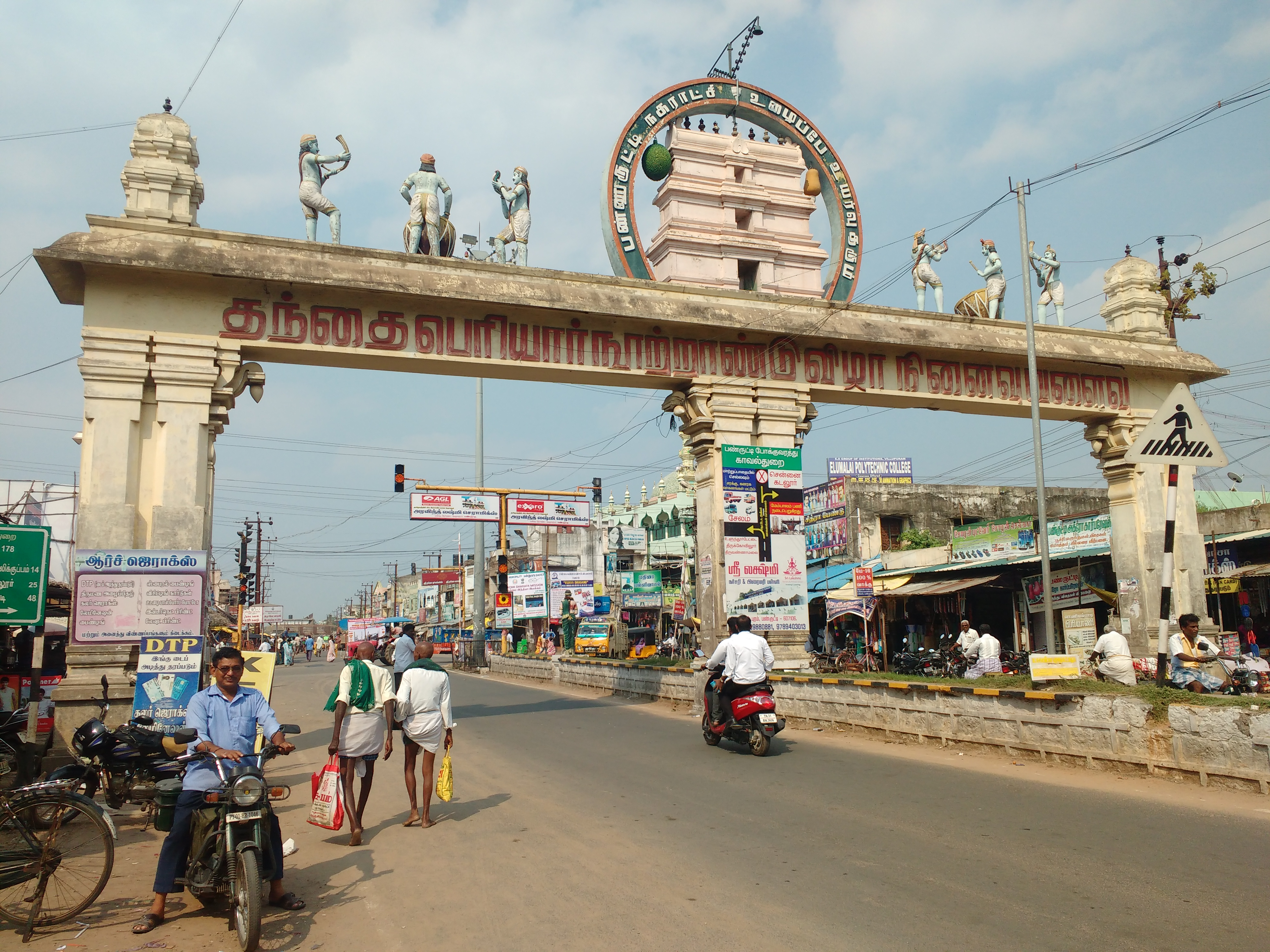
- Center of Panruti

- Location in Tamil Nadu, India
- Coordinates: 11.77°N 79.55°E
- Country: India
- State: Tamil Nadu
- District: Cuddalore
- Named for: Cashew bowl of Tamil Nadu

Government
  - Type: First Grade Municipality
  - Body: Panruti Municipality
- Elevation: 32 m (105 ft)

Population (2011)
  - Total: 60,323
- Demonym: Panrutian
- Time zone: UTC+5:30 (IST)
- PIN: 607106
- Telephone code: 04142Pannurutti
- Vehicle registration: TN-31
- Website: Panruti Municipality

Panruti is a town, municipality and taluk headquarters of Cuddalore district, Tamil Nadu, India, between Cuddalore and Neyveli.

== Geography and climate ==
Panruti is located at 11.77°N 79.55°E. Panruti is located on the main line of high ways. National highway NH-36 passes through this town, connects Vikravandi and Mannargudi. State Highway SH-68 which connects Cuddalore - Sankarapuram passes through Panruti. The town lies in mainway of Chennai and Kumbakonam. The town is well-connected with major cities in Tamilnadu.It has an average elevation of 32 metres (104 feet). The Gadilam River flows through the town and Thenpennai River is nearby.

Panruti has a hot and humid climate throughout the year, with high temperatures and high levels of humidity. The monsoon season brings heavy rainfall to the region, while the winter season is relatively drier and more comfortable.

The climate can be divided into three main seasons: summer, monsoon, and winter.

Summer: The summer season in Panruti lasts from March to May. During this time, the temperatures can reach as high as 40 °C (104 °F) during the day and rarely fall below 25 °C (77 °F) at night. The humidity is also high, making the weather feel hot and sticky.

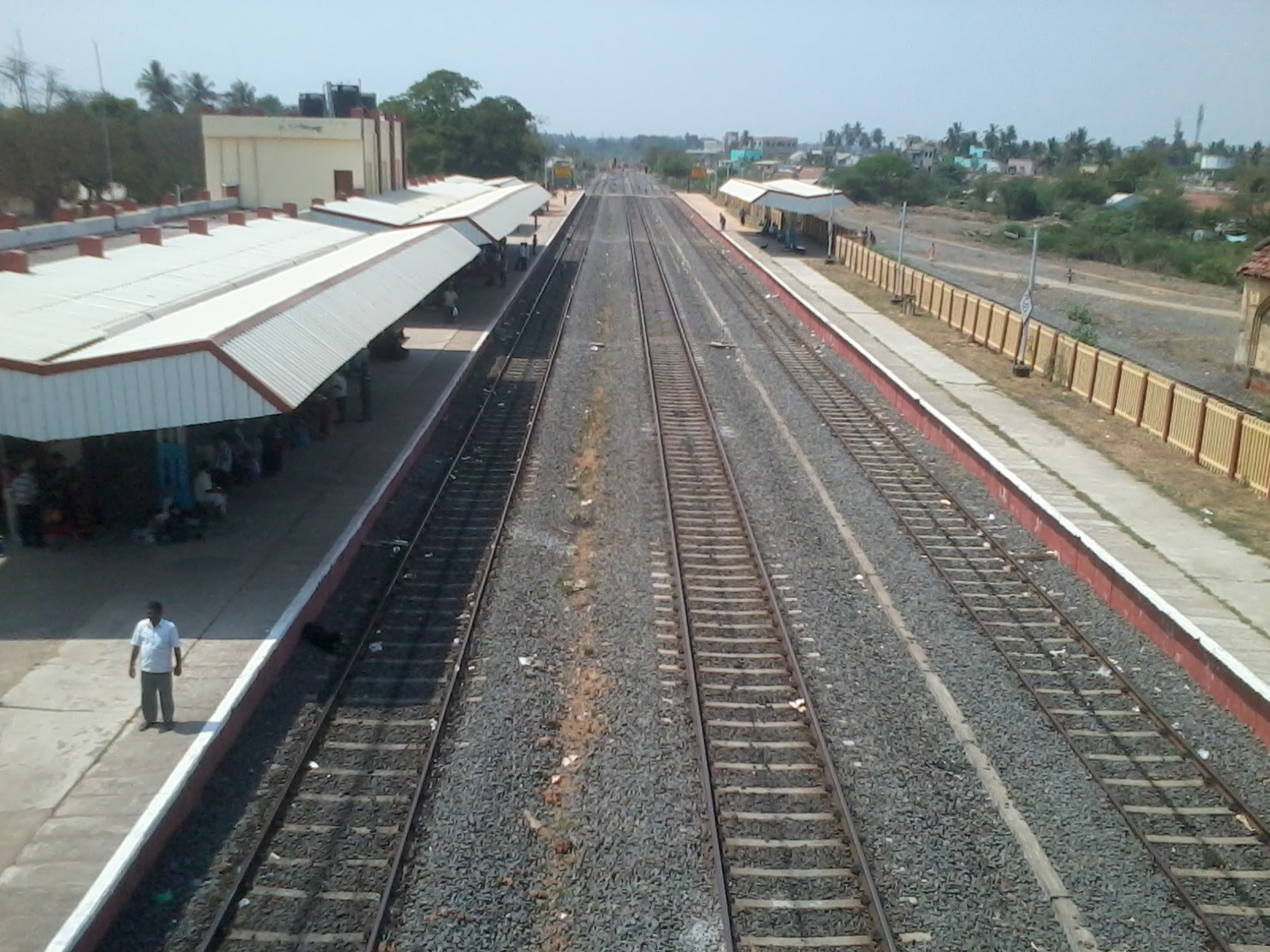
Panruti railway station's view

== Economy ==
Panruti produces cashews, and jackfruit.

== Villages ==
- Bandrakottai
- Puthupet
- Sitharasur
- Laksminaryanapuram
- Panickankuppam
- Athirikuppam
- Varinjipakkam

== Demographics ==
Religious census
Religion	Percent(%)
Hindu	87.36%
Muslim	11.0%
Christian	1.3%
Sikh	0.01%
Buddhist	0.03%
Jain	0.25%
Other	0.04%

According to 2011 census, Panruti had a population of 60,323 with a sex-ratio of 996 females for every 1,000 males, much above the national average of 929. A total of 6,257 were under the age of six, constituting 3,204 males and 3,053 females. Scheduled Castes and Scheduled Tribes accounted for 15.02% and .19% of the population respectively. The average literacy of the town was 76.19%, compared to the national average of 72.99%. The town had a total of 14170 households. There were a total of 21,822 workers, comprising 948 cultivators, 2,174 main agricultural labourers, 370 in house hold industries, 14,624 other workers, 3,706 marginal workers, 122 marginal cultivators, 1,660 marginal agricultural labourers, 93 marginal workers in household industries and 1,831 other marginal workers.

As per the religious census of 2011, Panruti had 87.36% Hindus, 11% Muslims, 1.3% Christians, 0.01% Sikhs, 0.03% Buddhists, 0.25% Jains and 0.04% following other religions.

== Gandhi statue ==
A five-foot-tall Gandhi statue at Gandhi park near the Four-Road junction at Panruti has an amalgamation of five precious metals and alloys - worth tens of millions of rupees, with gold comprising around 20 per cent of the statue's 200-odd kg weight i.e. 40 kg of gold.

== See also ==
- Andikuppam
- Balavihar School
- PerperiyanKuppam
- Vegakollai
