= Sitharasur =

- Village
- Country: India
- State: Tamil Nadu
- District: Cuddalore

Government
  - Body: Panruti taluk

Population (2011)
  - Total: 2,500

Languages
  - Official: Tamil
- Time zone: UTC+5:30 (IST)
- PIN: 607 102
- Vehicle registration: TN 32
- Nearest city: Panruti, Cuddalore
- Lok Sabha constituency: Panruti
- Vidhan Sabha constituency: Panruti
- Civic agency: Panruti taluk

Sitharasur is a small village panchayat in Panruti Taluk in Cuddalore District in Tamil Nadu, India. Annagramam, Panruti, Palur, Cuddalore, are the nearby towns to Sitharasur. Sitharasur is reachable by Melpattampakkam Railway Station, Panruti Railway Station, and Nellikuppam Railway Station.

== Locality ==
It is located 18 km west of district headquarters Cuddalore. 184 km from the state capital Chennai and the nearest railway station in Melpattambakkam.

== Education in Sitharasur ==
- Panchayat union school
- Govt high school
- Ramakrishna primary school
- M.R.K. primary school

== Sitharasur panchayat ==
Baskar Natarajan is the panchayat president of Sitharasur.

== Banks in sitharasur ==
- Canara Bank
- Indian Bank

== Population ==
According to census 2011, The population is around 2500.

== Business ==
Main business of this place is Agriculture. Crops cultivated are Sugar cane, Paddy, Serials, Chilli, Banana. The most notable is Betel leaves. The cultivated crops are sold in the nearest markets like Melpattambakkam, Panruti. The sugar cane cultivated here are exported to EID Parry India Ltd

== Market ==
Nearby Market is in Panruti
