= Aviyanur =

Neighbourhood in Cuddalore district, Tamil Nadu, India

- Neighbourhood
- Aviyanur, Cuddalore, Tamil Nadu
- Coordinates: 11.8483°N 79.4725°E
- Country: India
- State: Tamil Nadu
- District: Cuddalore
- Elevation: 55.56 m (182.3 ft)

Population (2011)
  - Total: 1,637

Languages
  - Official: Tamil
  - Speech: Tamil
- Time zone: UTC+5:30 (IST)
- PIN: 607101
- Other Neighbourhoods: Thiruthuraiyur, Oraiyur, Enathirimangalam
- LS: Cuddalore
- VS: Panruti

Aviyanur is a neighbourhood in Panruti taluk in Cuddalore district of Tamil Nadu state in India. Aviyanur village comes under Annagramam block in Cuddalore district.

== Location ==
Aviyanur is located with the coordinates of 11.8483°N 79.4725°E in Panruti.

== Demographics ==
As per 2011 census of India, the total population of Aviyanur village is 1,637 people, out of which 829 are males and 808 are females.

== Chola inscriptions ==
Chola inscriptions in the Tamil language, engraved on a stone in a Perumal temple which belonged to King Maduraikonda Kopparakesari Cholan (Parantaka Cholan 1) were found in Aviyanur. and inscriptions on Kopparakesarivarma Cholan also were found in Aviyanur.

== Religion ==
=== Hindu temple ===
There is a Shiva temple viz., Ashtamoortheeswarar temple is built in Aviyanur. This temple is maintained under the control of Hindu Religious and Charitable Endowments Department of Government of Tamil Nadu.
