= Silver Beach =

Silver Beach is the name of:

- several locations:
  - Silver Beach, Bronx, an area of the Throggs Neck neighborhood of the Bronx, a borough of New York City
  - Silver Beach, Michigan, an unincorporated community
  - Silver Beach, New Jersey, a beach in Toms River Township
  - Silver Beach Amusement Park, former amusement park in Michigan
  - Silver Beach (India), a beach in Tamil Nadu on the south eastern coast of India
  - Silver Beach (New South Wales), a beach on Botany Bay in Sydney
