= Kattu Sellur =

Kattu Sellur is a village in Kallakurichi district of Tamil-Nadu. The nearest town is Tirukoilur. People have been living in this village and evolving from the river civilization since before the Chola's and Pallava's administration. Located in middle of three towns Tirukoilur, Kallakurichi, Ulundurpet and then stands in Gadilam River bed which starts from Maiyanur.

== Economy ==
Basically people are dependent on agriculture and its relevant work. However, since 1995 a group of people go for concrete work where they build up new buildings and/or cement roads around 50 km surrounding.

In earlier days, people used to go Bangalore for the same building construction work. Then, they would go for reaping paddy in southern districts, reaping groundnut near the Andhra Pradesh border.

Now, most of the farmers are not cultivating the olden days crops like paddy, ground nuts, turmeric, elephant yam, urid dal, tapioca, cotton, pearl millet, ragi, corn, etc. But sugar cane cultivation is the major farming here for the past few years.
