= Samiyarpettai =

- village
- Country: India
- State: Tamil Nadu
- District: Cuddalore

Languages
  - Official: Tamil
- Time zone: UTC+5:30 (IST)

Samiyarpettai is a village in Cuddalore division on the Indian east coast about 24 kilometres (15 mi) south of Cuddalore Old Town, 50 kilometres (31 mi) south of Pondicherry and 210 kilometres (130 mi) south of Chennai, located on the Coromandel Coast of the Bay of Bengal. It lies midway between Cuddalore and Chidambaram east of Pudhuchattiram in Tamil Nadu, India.

The village hosts Shri Pinnai Vazhi Amman Shrine which is one of the biggest temple on the Cuddalore coast.
