= Puthupet =

Puthupet Thorapadi (or Puthupettai or Pudupet)
- Town Panchayat
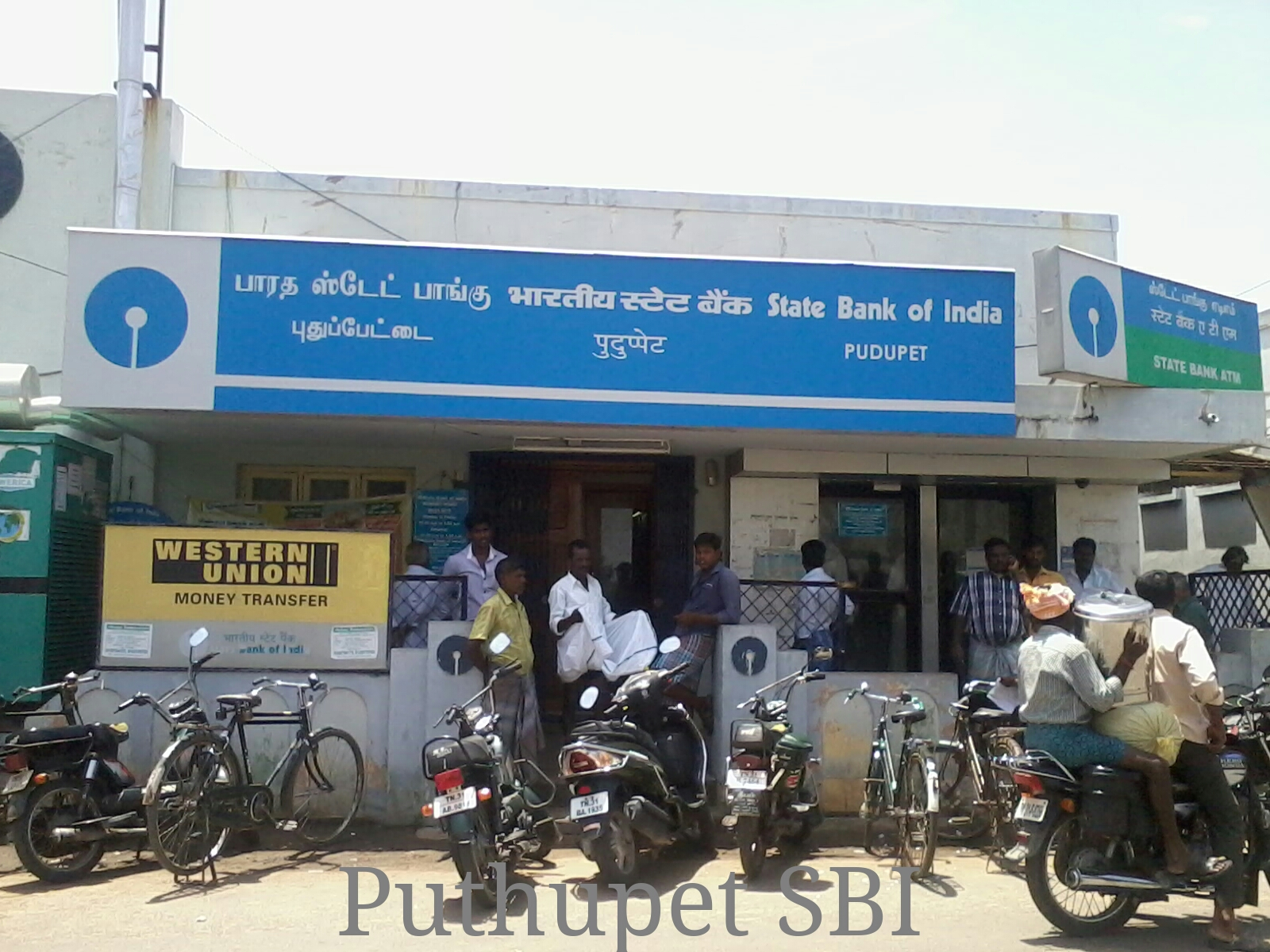
- Nickname: PPT
- Location in Tamil Nadu, India Puthupet (India)
- Coordinates: 11°47′N 79°31′E
- Country: India
- State: Tamil Nadu
- District: Cuddalore

Government
  - Type: Democracy
  - Body: Town Panchayat

Languages
  - Official: Tamil
- Time zone: UTC+5:30 (IST)
- PIN: 607108
- Telephone code: 04142
- Vehicle registration: TN31Z

Puthupet (or Pudupet), sometimes called Thorapadi, is a town panchayat situated in Panruti taluk, Cuddalore district in Tamil Nadu, India.

== Demographics ==
As of 2001, according to the India census, Puthupet had a population of 5557. Males constitute 51% of the population and females 49%. It has an average literacy rate of 70%, higher than the national average of 59.5%; the male literacy is 77%, and the female literacy rate is 62%. Ten percent of the population is under 6 years of age.

== Economy ==
The major occupation is hand loom weaving of lungi.

== Location ==
Bandrakottai (1 km, 0.62 mi), Ammappettai (1 km, 0.62 mi), Kotalambakkam (.5 km, 0.31 mi), Panapakkam (2 km, 1.2 mi), Anguchettipalayam (2 km, 1.2 mi), Thattanchavadi (2 km, 1.2 mi), and Kanisapakkam (2 km, 1.2 mi) are nearby localities to Puthupet. Panruti, Nellikuppam, Cuddalore, and Viluppuram are nearby cities.
