= Bandrakottai =

Bandarakottai Pandarakottai
- Village
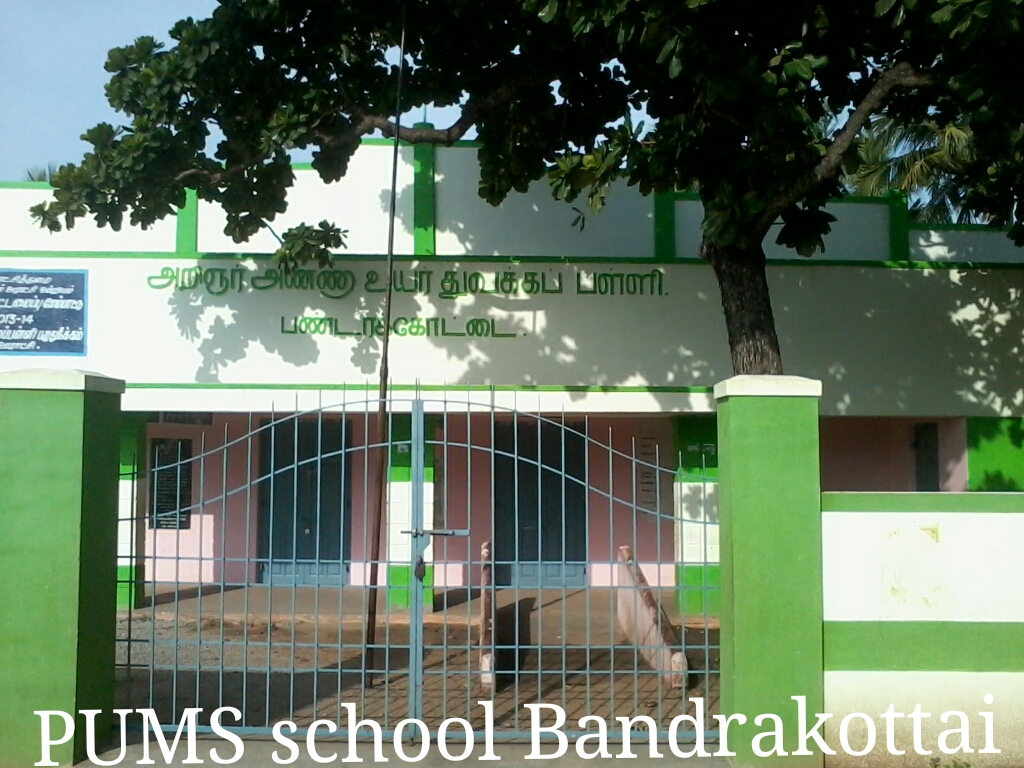
- PUMS Govt.Middle School, Bandarakottai.
- Nickname: BKT
- Location in Tamil Nadu, India Bandarakottai (India)
- Coordinates: 11.7828°N 79.5078°E
- Country: India
- State: Tamil Nadu
- District: Cuddalore

Government
  - Type: Democracy
  - Body: Village Panjayat

Languages
  - Official: Tamil
- Time zone: UTC+5:30 (IST)
- PIN: 607108
- Telephone code: 04142
- Vehicle registration: TN-31

Bandarakottai (or Pandarakottai) is a Village Panjayat. Which is situated in Panruti taluk, Cuddalore District, Tamil Nadu in India.

== About Bandarakottai ==
Bandrakottai is a village in Panruti Taluk in Cuddalore District of Tamil Nadu State, India. It is located 29 km west of the District headquarters Cuddalore. 6 km from Panruti. 188 km from State capital Chennai Bandarakottai and postal head office is Puthupet (CDL) . Nearest villages are Anguchettypalayam (2 km), Manapakkam (2 km), Pudhupettai (1.5 km), Panapakkam (2 km), Chinnapettai (3 km) are the nearby areas or places to Bandrakottai. Panruti, Viluppuram, Nellikuppam, Cuddalore are the nearby Cities to Bandarakottai.

This Place is in the border of the Cuddalore District and Pondicherry District. Pondicherry District Nettapakkam is East towards this place. Also it is in the Border of other district Villupuram. It is near to the Pondicherry State Border.

== Sub Villages of Bandarakottai ==
- Chinna-Ammapettai,
- Ammapettai,
- Vaaniyampalayam,
- Kuchippalayam
