= Battle of Cuddalore =

The Battle of Cuddalore refers to one of several conflicts near the south Indian town of Cuddalore:

- Siege of Cuddalore (1746), an action during the First Carnatic War (part of the War of the Austrian Succession)
- Siege of Cuddalore (1748)
- Battle of Cuddalore (1758), an indecisive naval battle during the Third Carnatic War (part of the Seven Years' War)
- Siege of Cuddalore, a 1783 siege during the Second Anglo-Mysore War (part of the Anglo-French War of 1778–1783)
- Battle of Cuddalore (1783), a naval battle that occurred during the siege
