= Andikuppam =

Village in Cuddalore District, Tamil Nadu, India

Coordinates: 12°38′N 80°07′E

Andikuppam is a village near Panruti, Tamil Nadu, India, where at least 700 hindu families earn their living. The place is well known for a 100-year-old hindu located here. The name of the mariyamman kovil. People from nearby mariyamman kovil visit the place often.

The Hindu kovil attendance population comprises mainly young boys and children. Expatriates comprise at least 90% of population, where most of the income comes from. Agriculture was once the main source of income, but these days most people go abroad to earn a living.

The place is not well connected to the nearby town by bus, because of the autorickshaw groups there.
