= Neyveli Airport =

Neyveli Airport (Aerodrome) நெய்வேலி விமான நிலையம்
- IATA: NVY; ICAO: VONY

Summary
- Airport type: Public
- Owner: NLC India Ltd
- Serves: Neyveli, Cuddalore, Tamil Nadu
- Location: NLC India Ltd
- Elevation AMSL: 184 ft / 56 m
- Coordinates: 11°36′49″N 079°31′35″E

Map
- Location of the airport in Tamil Nadu NVY (India)

Runways
Direction	Length		Surface
Direction	ft	m	Surface
05/23	3,937	1,200	Asphalt

Neyveli Airport (IATA: NVY, ICAO: VONY) is located in Neyveli, Tamil Nadu, India. The airport is owned by the Neyveli Lignite Corporation (NLC) and is located at National Highway 45C, adjacent to the NLC township. The airport is spread over 220 acres and has a 3000 square metre apron suitable for one ATR-72 sized aircraft. Vayudoot used to operate flights to Chennai Airport with their Dornier Do 228-100 from here in the 1990s but services were withdrawn after a while.

The Airports Authority of India is upgrading the airport to enable commencement of commercial flights under the Regional Connectivity Scheme (RCS) by the end of 2018. Civil work such as runway re-carpeting, construction of terminal building, etc., have been taken up.
