= Silver Beach (India) =

Beach in Tamil Nadu, India

Coordinates: 11.7393°N 79.7865°E

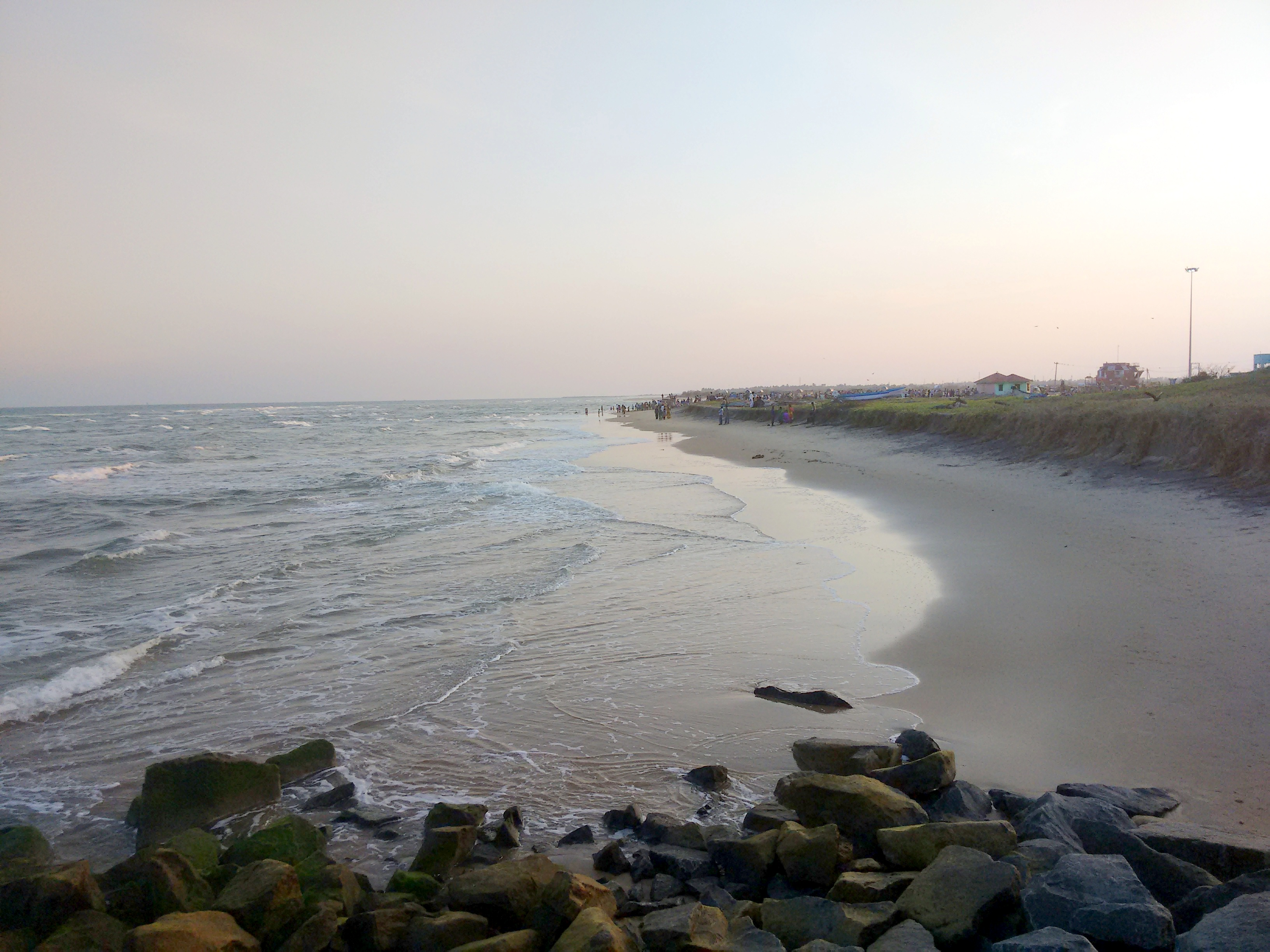
- Shore of Silver Beach, Cuddalore
- Location: Cuddalore, India
- Coast: Coromandel, Bay of Bengal
- Type: Urban, natural sandy beach
- Governing authority: Cuddalore Corporation

Silver Beach is a beach on the southeast coast of India. It is located 2 km (1.2 mi) from downtown Cuddalore, the headquarters of Cuddalore district in the state of Tamil Nadu. Silver Beach, however, is untouched by the busy life of the city. It is the second longest beach on the Coromandel Coast and one of the longest beaches in Asia. The 57 km-long stretch of beach faces severe seafront erosion.

== Transportation ==
There are town buses which ply frequently between Cuddalore town bus stand and Silver Beach. It is also accessible via Taxis and Autos from different parts of the town.

== Water sports ==
To the south of the beach the South Cuddalore Bay area appears as if it is a separate island. The backwater separating the main beach from the island-like structure is a safe place for water sports. Boats are not available for rent currently as the boat house has been closed.

== Mangrove ==
To the west a river flows into dense mangrove forests teeming with birds. On the coast there is century-old lighthouse. A few resorts have sprung up in the area. Most of these are sponsored by the state government for promoting tourism.

== Forts in the beach ==
Silver Beach is also the location of Fort St. David, which has a long history as one of the three important forts built by the British Empire. An arts college, Periyar College of Arts and Science, is situated near the beach. There are summer festivals celebrated in Silver Beach yearly during April or May.

== Tsunami ==
The beach was struck by the 2004 Asian tsunami. It was the second most heavily affected area, after Nagapattinam, Tamil Nadu. The death toll at Silver Beach was more than 2,700.
