= Gadilam River =

Coordinates: 11°44′N 79°47′E

Gadilam River Kedilam River
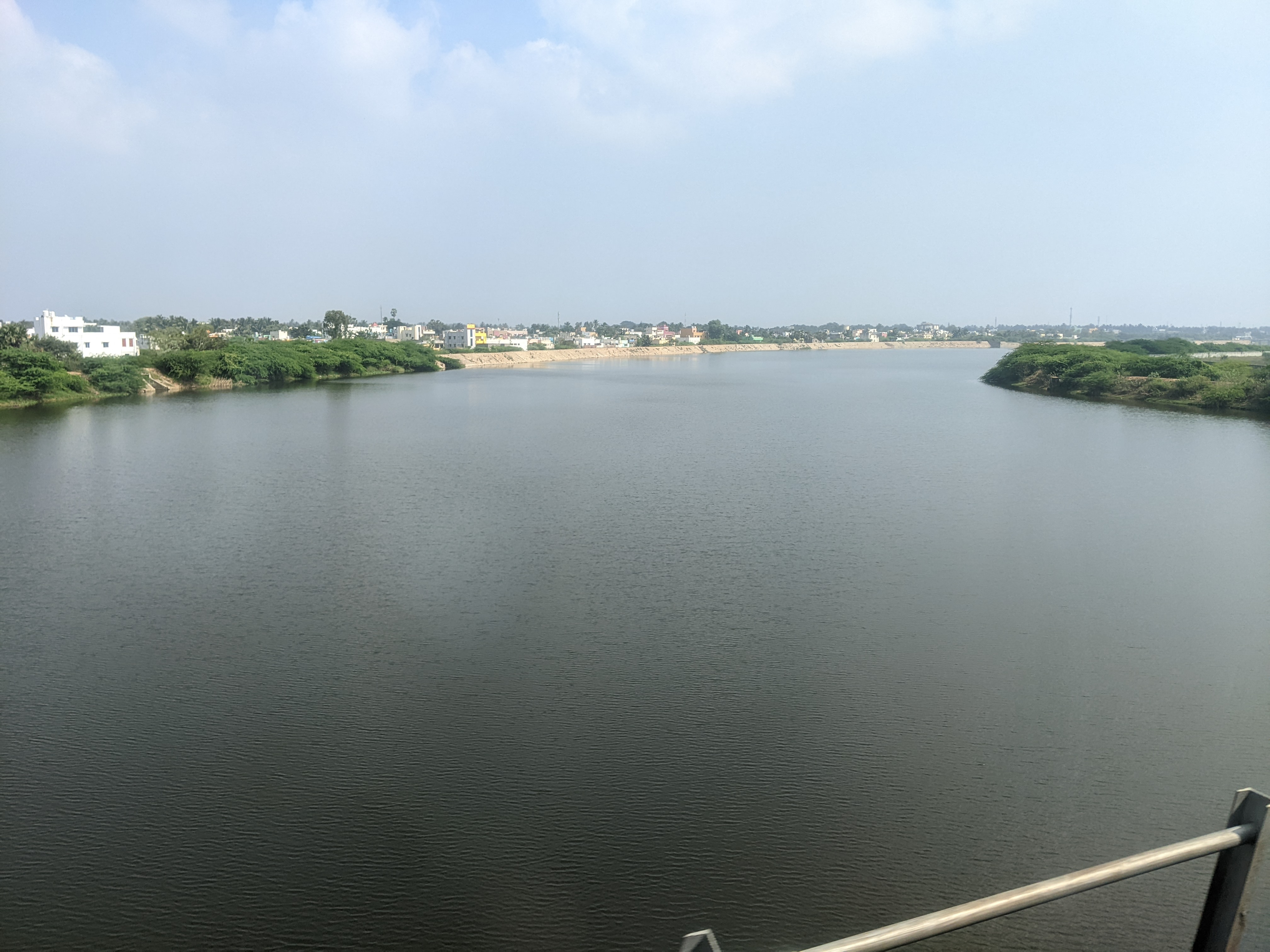
- Gadilam River near Tirupadripulyur - December 2021
- Interactive map of Gadilam River

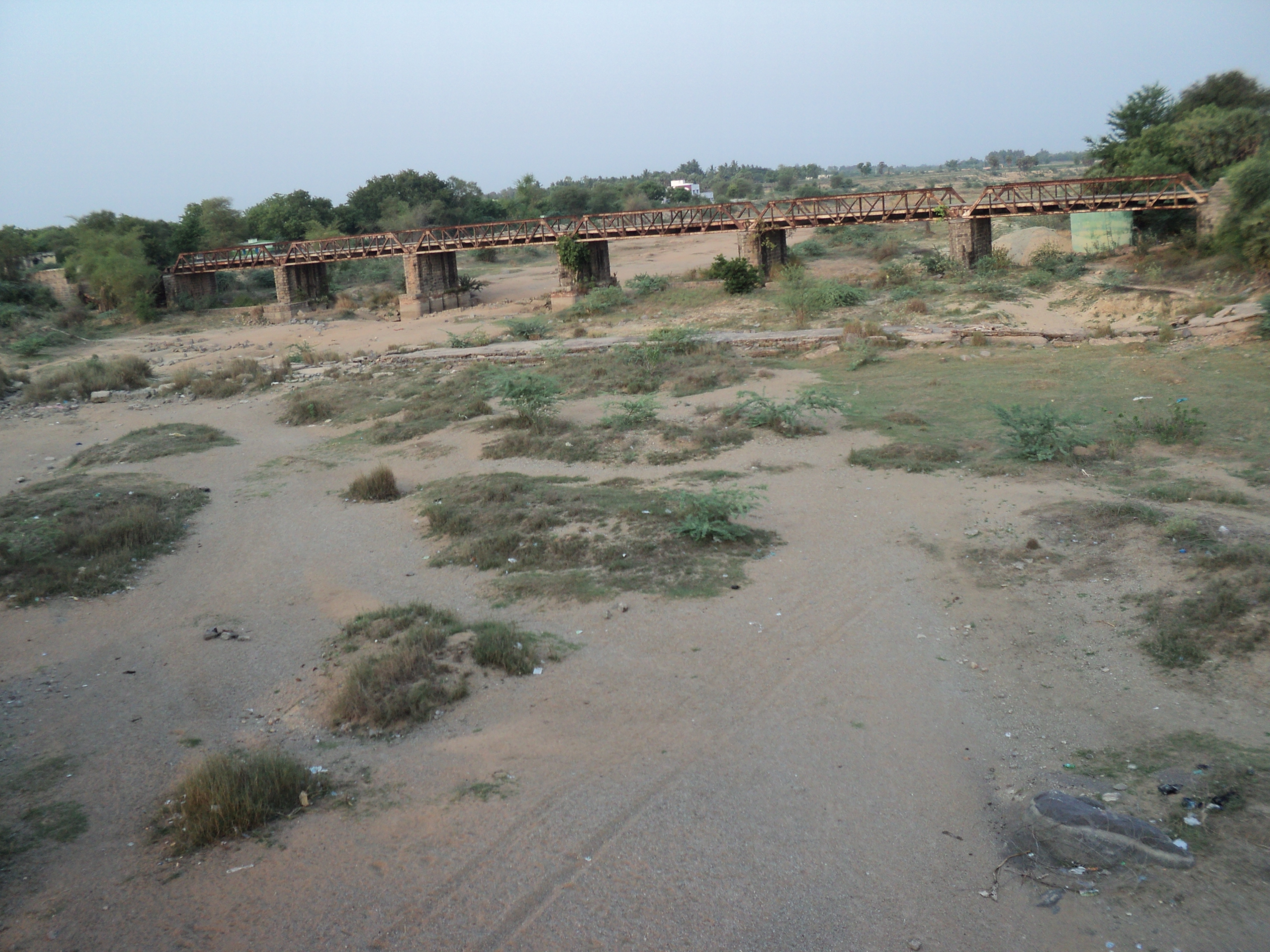
Gadilam River

The Gadilam River (sometimes pronounced Kedilam) flows through the Cuddalore and Viluppuram districts of Tamil Nadu.

It has a small water flow, drainage area and sand deposit and is generally flooded during the monsoon season and raises the water table and feed tanks on its basin. Few famous temples like Thiruvathigai Veerataneshwar temple and Thiruvanthipuram Thevanathan perumal temple are located in its banks. It is also mentioned in the Medieval Bhakti literatures like Thevaram. The ruins of Fort St. David is located at the mouth of the river.

The Gadilam River flows from Maiyanoor near Kattu_Sellur alias Gedilam and Thirunavalur through the town of Cuddalore and separates the Old Town from Thirupadiripuliyur.
