= Pulavanur =

Village in Cuddalore, Tamil Nadu

- village
- Country: India
- State: Tamil Nadu
- District: Cuddalore

Languages
  - Official: Tamil
- Time zone: UTC+5:30 (IST)

Pulavanur (Village ID 636525) is a village in Cuddalore district, Tamil Nadu, India (PIN 607205). It is located on the southern bank of the Thenpennai River (Pennaiaru). Pulavanur has several temples and notable among them are Kalyana Venkateswara temple (it had Kumbabhishekam on 12 February 2012 after 39 years), Mariamman temple and a locally quite famous Draupati Amman temple. Every year in the month of march, a festival called Theemithi Thiruvizha (fire walking festival) is celebrated at Draupati Amman temple. As part of the temple festival an annual therukkooththu based on Mahabharata themes has been staged for more than 100 years and it has been a major attraction for the villages around Pulavanur. The village is approximately 7.5 km from Panruti one of the major commercial center for jack fruit markets and cashew markets in Tamil Nadu. Pulavanur village can be reached from Vikravandi via state highway 36 right after crossing the Penniar river on the main trunk road to Panruti and Kumbakonam. Pulavanur and Kandarakkottai are two nearby villages on either side of the main trunk road.

According to the 2011 census it has a population of 4090 living in 983 households. Its main agriculture product is sugarcane growing.

The Kalyana Venkateswara Temple at Pulavanur is located at the centre of the village Agraharam with a few Iyengar Brahmin houses around the temple. In Pulavanur Sri Navaneetha Krishnan - Draupathy Amman Temple is also located here. Once a year the Theemithi Thiruvizha is celebrated in grand manner. Sidhi Vinayagar Temple and Arasi Amman Temple also located in and around Pulavanur.

== History ==
Great saints like Ramalinga Swamigal and Kozhialam Swamigal have visited this village. When Saint Ramalinga Swamigal permanently moved from Chennai to Mettukkuppam, he used to visit Pulavanur to have philosophical discussions with a great Sanskrit scholar Pulavanur Chakravartiyachariar on Visishtadvaita and Sri Vaishnava philosophy and other philosophical systems. His adopted son Desikachariar (1875-1922) was a renowned Sanskrit scholar known for his erudition in Tarkam, Vyakarnam and Vedantam. Several students from neighbouring villages like Kandarakkottai, Kanisapakkam, Venkatadri agaram, Paithambadi and so on used to get advanced training on Nyaya Sastra and on the terse philosophical works of Vedanta Desika, like the Nyaya sidhdhanchanam and Thathvateeka. Notable among his students were Venkatadri Agaram Ananthachariar and Venkatadri agaram Krishnamachariar.

The two brothers served in the department of Sanskrit at Pachaippa's college and Madras Presidency college. Inspired by their training under Pulavanur Desikachariar, and later by Garudapuram Swamy, they did pioneering works in editing several palm leaf manuscripts like Lakshmi Tantram, Manusmriti, Dayashatakam and Sri Bhashyam (the celebrated work of Saint Ramanuja on the Brahmasutra). One of the most renowned Srivaisnavite sannyasin Sri Kozhialam Rangaramanuja Mahadesikan spent the first few months at this village right after taking up sanyasa asramam. Pulavanur Desikachariar's scholarship and orthodoxy was an attraction not only to such saints. and bright sishyas, but also to many other great Sanskrit scholars like Kapistalam Desikachariar and Thayyar Ammalachariar. Pulavanur swamy's (as he was affectionately called by scholars) exposition on the importance of Samasrayanam under the title Tapta Chakrangitam at a vidwat sadas in Thiruvaheendirapuram in 1922 was the talk of scholars around the agraharams of South Arcot. In a nutshell he put Pulavanur as a village for Sanskrit scholarship. Here are a few references to Pulavanur and Pulavanur Desikachariar.
