= Vegakollai =

Village in Tamil Nadu, India

Vegakkollai is a village and Gram panchayat located in the Panruti Taluk of Cuddalore district, Tamil Nadu, India. It is situated 14.9 km from the main town of Panruti and 24.1 km from the district headquarters, Cuddalore.

Vegakkollai is approximately 173 km from the state capital, Chennai.

== Near by towns ==
- Indira Nagar, Neyveli - 6 km
- Kurinjipadi - 10.3 km
- Panruti - 14.9 km
- Vadalur - 15 km
- Annagramam - 16.9 km
- Cuddalore - 21 km

== Nearby villages ==
- Ayeepettai - 1.2 km
- Vengadampettai - 1.5 km
- A. Puthur - 2 km
- Co. Chathiram - 2 km
- Koranapattu - 2.8 km
- Siruthondamadevi - 3 km
- Keelakollai - 4 km
- Krishnankuppam - 4 km
- Arasadikuppam - 4 km
- Kananchavadi - 4 km

== Places of worship ==
Vegakkollai is home to several ancient temples, each with deep cultural and spiritual significance:

- Kalapar Eswaran Kovil – An ancient temple dedicated to Lord Shiva.
- Murugan Kovil – A historic temple devoted to Lord Murugan.
- Kali Kovil – Dedicated to Goddess Kali.
- Om Shathi Kovil – Known for its tranquil atmosphere.
- Mariamman Kovil – A temple for Goddess Mariamman.
- Pillayar Kovil – A temple dedicated to Lord Ganesha.
- Iyyanar Kovil – A place of worship for Lord Ayyanar, a guardian deity.
- Purathaman Kovil – Another revered temple in the village.

Nearby, in Vengadampettai (1.5 km from Vegakkollai), stands the Ranganathar Kovil, renowned for housing the world’s largest statue of Lord Ranganathar in a reclining pose. This temple is approximately 1,000 years old and holds historical and religious significance.

== Education ==
Vegakkollai is served by local schools, including:

- Panchayat Union Middle School
- Panchayat Union Elementary School

These schools provide foundational education for the village children and support the community's educational needs.

== Economy ==
Vegakkollai village is nestled amidst cashew nut groves and jackfruit trees, with agriculture as its primary occupation. Most residents engage in organic farming, which is environmentally friendly and sustainable. Major crops include bananas, sugarcane, and groundnuts. In addition, the village is home to other enterprises such as small- to large-scale country chicken poultry farms, cashew shelling, and cashew export businesses, alongside jackfruit and banana cultivation.

Residents of Vegakkollai pursue a mix of careers, including self-employment, government roles, and engineering positions spanning from mechanical to IT industries.

The nursery garden business is also a significant industry here, with many villagers specializing in growing flower saplings, including country roses, casuarina hybrid clones, Kanagambaram, and jasmine. Vegakkollai has become a major hub for nursery gardens and horticulture, producing skilled horticulturists, including graduates from the village itself. These nurseries employ diverse propagation techniques, such as cutting, layering, grafting, and budding, to grow a variety of plants like tree saplings (casuarina, papaya, guava), flowering plants (Kanagambaram, rose), and medicinal herbs (Tulsi, Karpooravalli).

The horticulture industry in Vegakkollai also supports services in plant conservation, landscape restoration, garden design, construction, and maintenance, arboriculture, and horticultural therapy. This diverse range of agricultural products and services contributes to food security, medicinal needs, environmental health, and overall human well-being, making Vegakkollai a renowned center for horticulture

== Elected Representatives ==
The area of Vegakkollai includes several hamlets: Vegakkollai, Vegakkollai Puthur, Kattu Vegakkollai, and Vegakkollai Chathiram. The panchayat has approximately 2,300 registered voters.

Vegakkollai falls under the Neyveli MLA constituency and the Cuddalore Lok Sabha constituency.

== Bank ==
- Canara Bank – Includes an ATM facility located at Vegakkollai Chathiram.
- Tamil Nadu Co-operative Society – Serving the community with various financial services.

== Bus Services ==
The Tamil Nadu Villupuram Transport Corporation provides bus services to Vegakkollai on the following routes:

- Bus 21: Connects Panruti and Kurinjipadi, passing through Keelakollai and Vegakkollai.
- Bus 10: Connects Cuddalore and Vegakkollai via Kullanchavadi.
- Bus 20: Links Panruti and Kurinjipadi, passing through Kadapulliyur Register Office and Vegakkollai.

== Bus Route No : 21 ==
Departures from Panruti:

- 6:20 AM – Arrives at Vegakkollai: 7:00 AM, Ends at Kurinjipadi: 7:20 AM
- 10:00 AM – Arrives at Vegakkollai: 11:20 AM, Ends at Kurinjipadi: 11:50 AM
- 4:20 PM – Arrives at Vegakkollai: 5:00 PM, Ends at Kurinjipadi: 5:20 PM
- 7:20 PM – Arrives at Vegakkollai: 8:00 PM, Ends at Kurinjipadi: 8:20 PM

Departures from Kurinjipadi:

- 7:50 AM – Arrives at Vegakkollai: 8:15 AM, Ends at Panruti: 8:50 AM
- 11:50 AM – Arrives at Vegakkollai: 12:15 PM, Ends at Panruti: 12:50 PM
- 5:50 PM – Arrives at Vegakkollai: 6:30 PM, Ends at Panruti: 7:00 PM
- 8:50 PM – Arrives at Vegakkollai: 9:30 PM, Ends at Panruti: 10:15 PM

== Bus Route No: 10 ==
Route: Cuddalore — via Kullanchavadi, Ambalavanan Pet, Kattiyankuppam, Chathiram, Thani Pathalutti, Kattu-Vegakkollai, Vegakkollai, Ayeepettai.

Bus No. 10 Timings

Departures from Vegakkollai:

- 5:00 AM – Arrives in Cuddalore: 6:20 AM
- 8:30 AM – Arrives in Cuddalore: 11:20 AM
- 12:30 PM – Arrives in Cuddalore: 1:50 PM
- 3:00 PM – Arrives in Cuddalore: 4:10 PM
- 6:00 PM – Arrives in Cuddalore: 7:20 PM
- 8:30 PM – Arrives in Cuddalore: 9:40 PM

Departures from Cuddalore:

- 6:30 AM – Arrives in Vegakkollai: 8:00 AM
- 11:20 AM – Arrives in Vegakkollai: 12:10 PM
- 1:50 PM – Arrives in Vegakkollai: 2:50 PM
- 4:20 PM – Arrives in Vegakkollai: 5:50 PM
- 7:30 PM – Arrives in Vegakkollai: 8:50 PM
- 9:50 PM – Arrives in Vegakkollai: 11:00 PM

== Bus Route No: 20 ==
Route: Panruti — via Kadapulliyur Register Office, Chinna Poorakani, Periya Poorakani, Varisangkupam, Kananchavadi, Azhagapasamuthiram, Arasadikuppam, Chiruthondamadevi, A. Pudur, Thani Pathalutti, Kattu-Vegakkollai, Vegakkollai, Ayeepettai, Vengadampettai, Annadanampettai (Link Road), Paacharapalayam (Link Road), Meenachipettai, Railway Bus Stop (Kurinjipadi), Perumal Kovil, and Kurinjipadi (Bus Stand).

Bus No. 20 Timings

Departures from Panruti:

- 7:45 AM – Arrives at Vegakkollai: 8:50 AM, Ends at Kurinjipadi: 9:15 AM

Departures from Kurinjipadi:

- 9:00 AM – Arrives at Vegakkollai: 10:00 AM, Ends at Panruti: 10:50 AM
