= PerperiyanKuppam =

Village in Panruti, Tamil Nadu, India

Coordinates: 11°40′N 79°29′E

PerperiyanKuppam (PPK), also known as Kallodaavi among neighboring peoples, is a village in Panruti, in the western end of Cuddalore District of Tamil Nadu State, India.

== Demographics ==
As of 2007, the population is around 2000, 1200 of them have voting rights. There is an old Shivan temple in perperiyankuppm. There is a Pond near to the temple, which also serves as main water source for perperiyankuppam and the neighbor villages during summer time. Temple is 700 years old.

== Education ==
There are five schools in PerperiyanKuppam, three of which are government schools and two private-owned.

- Government Boys Higher Secondary School
- Government Girls Higher Secondary School
- Elementary School
- Kaliyaperumal Matric School
- Rajarajan Matric School

== Health care ==
There is one Tamil Nadu government run primary health center, and a few small private health care centers.

== Business in PPK ==
Because the cashew nut is the main agricultural product in PPK, many people do cashew-related business. Few people are working in Neyveli Lignite Corporation and few are doing wood related business.
