= Panruti taluk =

Coordinates: 11.77°N 79.55°E

Panruti taluk is a taluk of Cuddalore district of the Indian state of Tamil Nadu. The headquarters of the taluk is the town of Panruti.

== Demographics ==
According to the 2011 census, the taluk of Panruti had a population of 412,654 with 207,509 males and 205,145 females. There were 989 women for every 1,000 men. The taluk had a literacy rate of 67.96%. Child population in the age group below 6 was 23,623 Males and 21,261 Females.
