= Neyveli =

- Industrial city and Township
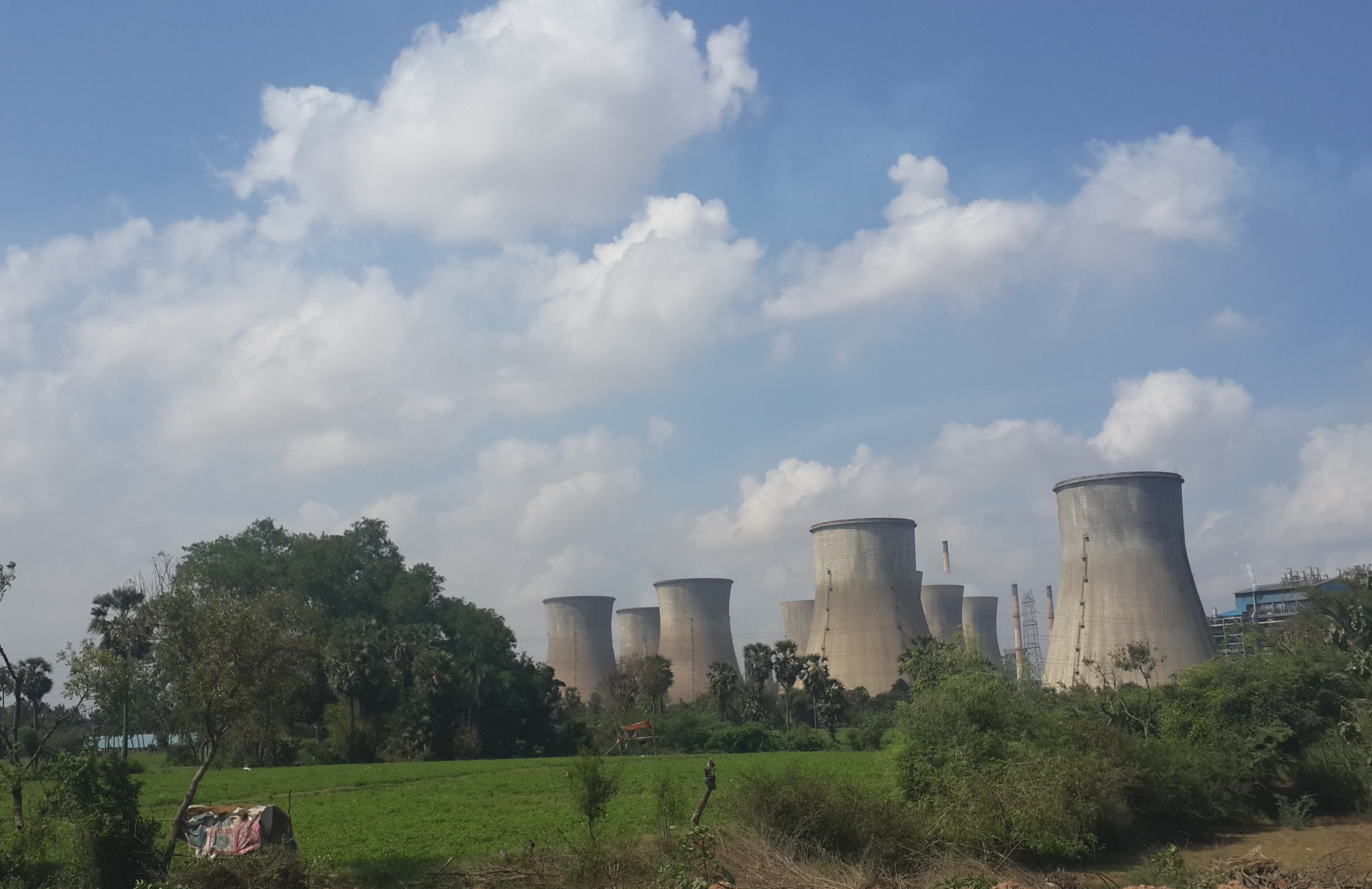
- Neyveli Thermal Power plant
- Nickname: Powercity
- Location in Tamil Nadu, India
- Coordinates: 11.533307°N 79.483297°E
- Country: India
- State: Tamil Nadu
- District: Cuddalore

Government
  - Type: Municipality
  - Body: Neyveli Municipality
- Elevation: 87 m (285 ft)

Population (2011)
  - Total: 105,687

Languages
  - Official: Tamil
- Time zone: UTC+5:30 (IST)
- Postal code: 607802
- Vehicle registration: TN-31 (Old), TN-91 (New)
- Website: https://www.nlcindia.com

Neyveli is an Industrial city in the Cuddalore district in the state of Tamil Nadu, India. It is located 22.87 kilometres (14.21 mi) inland from the Bay of Bengal, west of Pondicherry and 197 kilometres (122 mi) south of Chennai. The city was developed in 1956 after the establishment of Neyveli Lignite Corporation, a public sector enterprise.

== History ==
In 1935, the presence of black particles was discovered by Jambulinga Mudaliar. The analysis led to the discovery of lignite reserves beneath the areas in and around Neyveli village. The Neyveli Lignite Corporation was formed as a corporate Body in 1956 by the Government of India. The mining of lignite started in 1962. The first thermal power station was commissioned in 1962 with assistance from the U.S.S.R. . NLC India Limited has been adjudged as the fastest growing Public Sector Enterprise (Navratna category) by the Hindustan Times group based on a Study/survey by Price Waterhouse Cooper under the Navratna category.

== Geography and climate ==
Neyveli is located at 11.60°N 79.48°E. It has an average elevation of 87 metres (285 ft). It is located along with the Chennai-Thanjavur National Highway. Neyveli was a planned township and is sub-divided into 'blocks'. There are 32 blocks with each block measuring 1 kilometre (0.62 mi) by 0.7 kilometres (0.43 mi) separated by double-lane roads. Each block has streets which are uniquely named. The township houses nearly 15,000 houses and apartments.

The famous Natarajar temple, which is considered as world's biggest idol is located here. Villudaiyanpattu, a temple where Lord Muruga holds a bow and arrow, is the family deity for many in the villages surrounding Neyveli.

Neyveli has a low-moderate tropical climate with hot summers and cool winters. It has red soil, which is cultivable.

== Demographics ==
As per 2011 census, the population of Neyveli is 105,687; of which male and female are 53,442 and 52,245 respectively. Total literates are 90,114 of which 47,876 are males while 42,238 are females. Average literacy rate of Neyveli city is 90.98 percent of which male and female literacy was 95.86 and 86.01 percent. The sex ratio is 978 females per 1000 males. The child sex ratio of girls is 898 per 1000 boys. Total children (between 0 and 6 years of age) are 6,634 with 3,496 boys and 3,138 girls.

== Administration and politics ==
The town is administered by the township, working under the NLC India Limited (formerly Neyveli Lignite Corporation) and provides utility services. Neyveli elects its member to the Tamil Nadu assembly from Neyveli constituency. The town comes under the Cuddalore Lok Sabha Parliamentary constituency. Tamil Nadu Police is in charge of the law-enforcement agency in Neyveli, supervised by a Deputy Superintendent of Police (DSP) and includes a dedicated All-Women Special Police Station. Apart from the State Police services, the industrial units employ Central Industrial Security Force (CISF) for security.

The current Member of Legislative Assembly from Neyveli constituency is Saba Rajendran of Dravida Munnetra Kazhagam.

== Economy ==
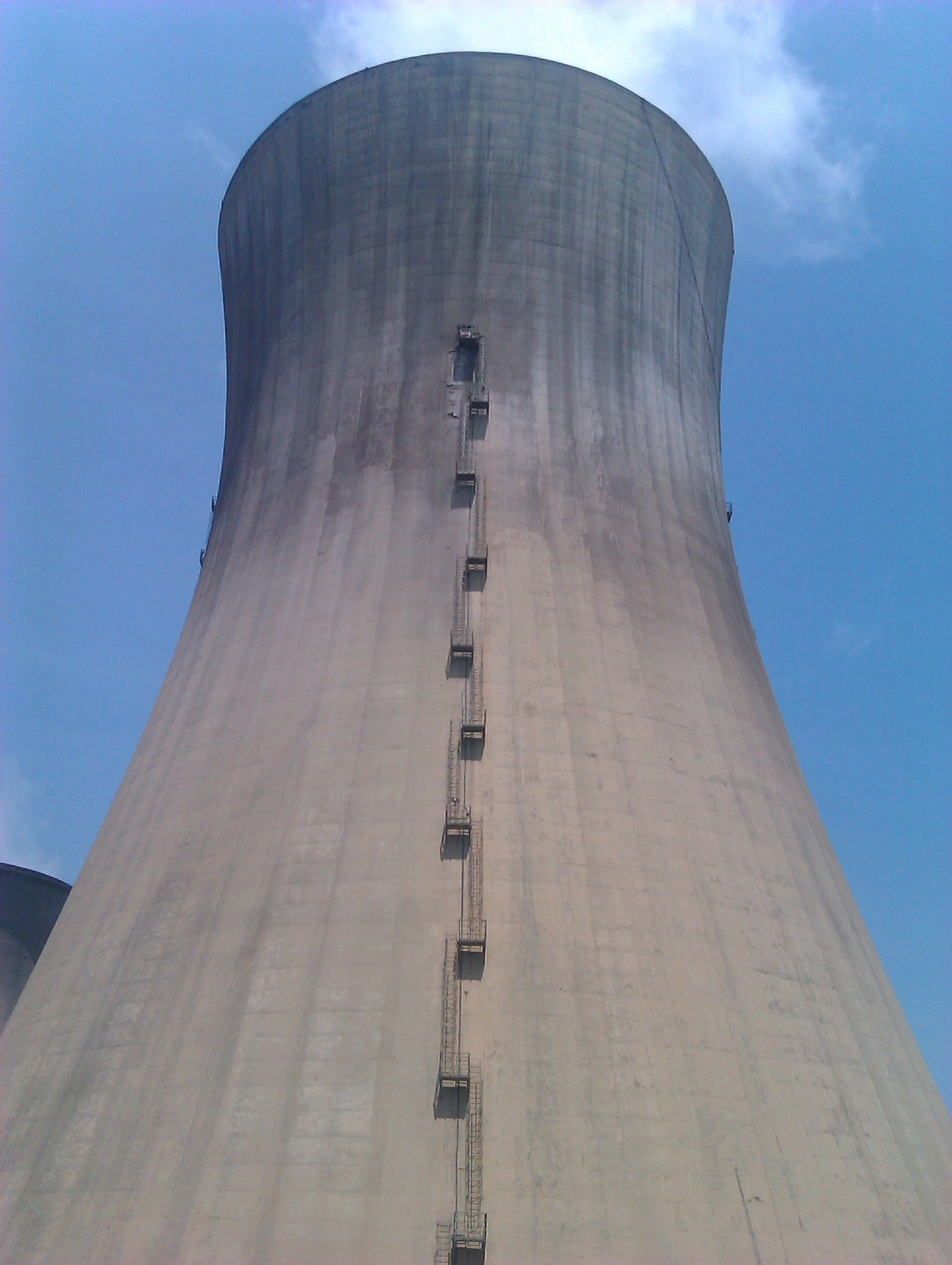
Neyveli Power plant

The economy is based on the lignite mines and the associated thermal power stations. Other small industries include cashew nut, bricks, weaving and agriculture.

== Transport ==
Transport inside the township is managed by NLC and has two bus stations for outstation connectivity. Neyveli has a railway station which lies on the Cuddalore-Salem railway line with daily passenger trains. The nearest major railway stations are Cuddalore Port Junction (40 km) and Virudhachalam (21 km). The nearest airport is at Puducherry. The Airports Authority of India (AAI) will spruce up Neyveli Airport after the Central government awarded three-year rights to airlines to connect these towns to Chennai as part of its regional air connectivity scheme, UDAN (Ude Desh ka Aam Nagrik).

== Health care ==
There are more than 30 hospitals in Neyveli. NLC has its own multi-speciality hospital which provides consultation and treatment free of cost to NLC employees and their dependents. Some of the notable hospitals are located in Neyveli are SNS Hospital, Ponni hospital, Ulagamathi hospital. SNS Hospital is the first hospital in Cuddalore district to have a modular operation theatre. Mullai child development center only one Occupational therapy clinic around neyveli.

- Government Veterinary Dispensary, Neyveli
- Thillai pet clinic, Neyveli

== Sports ==
There is a stadium in Neyveli managed by the NLC named Bharathi Stadium. It will hold all the important functions like Republic day celebration, Independence Day celebration. It is also responsible for conducting many important sports event in and around this zone. There are also many other sports like Swimming pools, Football, Badminton, Cricket, Hockey, Town club & Lignite City Clubs are also present in NLC.

== Notable residents ==
- Sajan Prakash, Olympic swimmer
- Suchitra Ella, co-founder, Bharat Biotech
- Natana Kasinathan, an Indian historian, archaeologist, author and epigraphist. Director of the Tamil Nadu Archaeology Department, Government of Tamil Nadu

Natana Kasinathan
