= Cuddalore =

- City
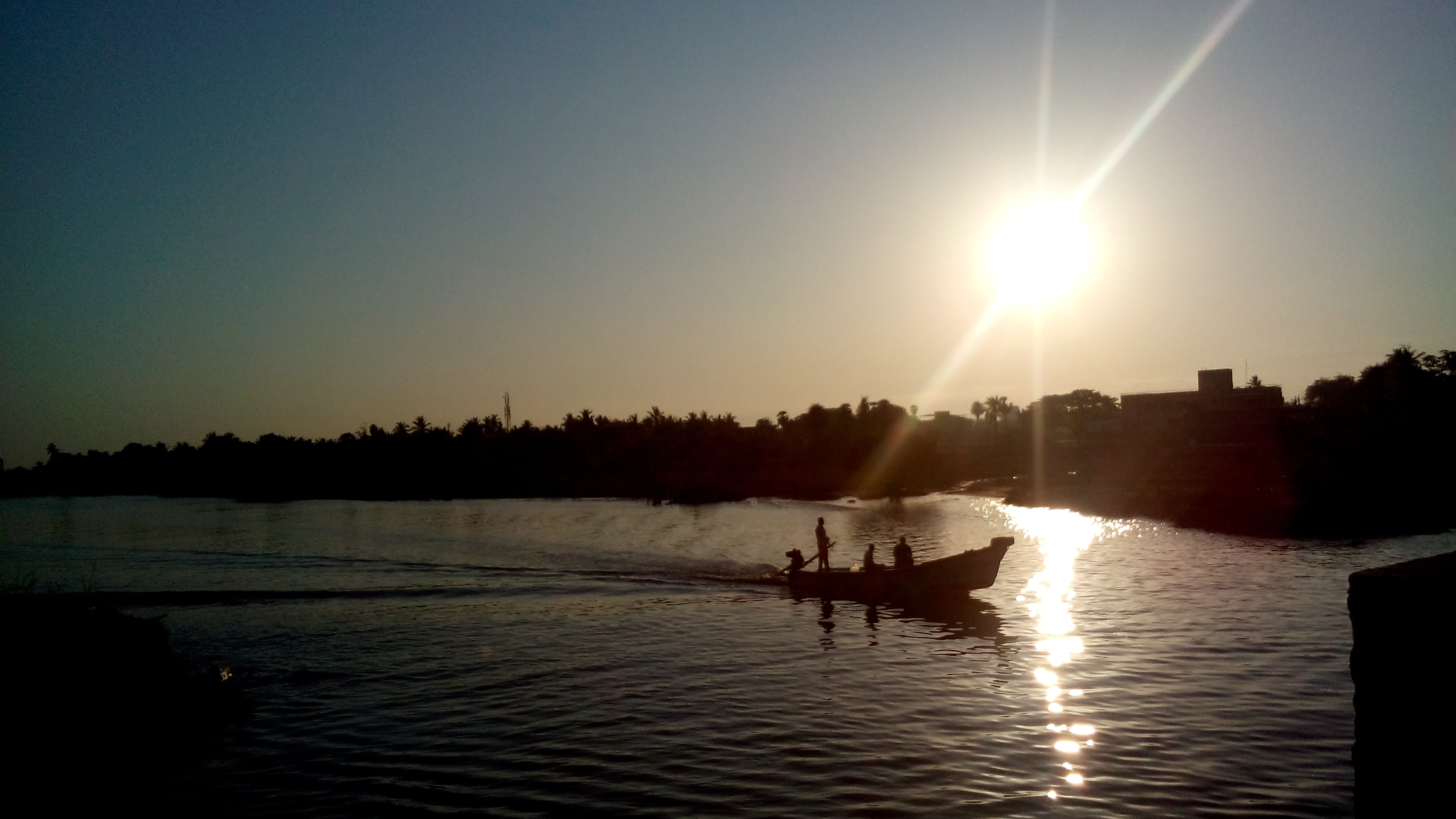
- Nickname: Sugar Bowl of Tamil Nadu
- Location in India Location in Tamil Nadu, India
- Coordinates: 11.75°N 79.75°E
- Country: India
- State: Tamil Nadu
- District: Cuddalore
- Region: Tondai Nadu

Government
  - Type: Municipal Corporation
  - Body: Cuddalore City Municipal Corporation
- Elevation: 1 m (3.3 ft)

Population (2021)
  - Total: 308,781
- Demonym: Cuddalorean

Languages
  - Official: Tamil, English
- Time zone: UTC+5:30 (IST)
- PIN: 607001-06 / 607401-02
- Telephone code: 04142 / 0413(some areas)
- Vehicle registration: TN-31
- Website: https://cuddalore.nic.in/

Cuddalore, also spelt as Kadalur (Note: Cuddalore is the British English spelling, and Kaḍalūr is the romanized spelling from Tamil script.) (/kʌdəˈlɔːr/), is a heavy industries hub, port city, and headquarters of the Cuddalore District in the Indian state of Tamil Nadu. Situated 5.3 km south of Puducherry (union territory), the city was an important port city during the British Raj. Cuddalore district is famous for Pichavaram Mangrove Forest.

While the early history of Cuddalore remains unclear, the city first rose to prominence during the Pallavas' and Medieval Cholas' reign. After the fall of the Cholas, the town was ruled by various dynasties like Pandyas, Vijayanagar Empire, Madurai Nayaks, Thanjavur Nayaks, Thanjavur Marathas, Tipu Sultan, the French and the British Empire. Cuddalore was also a theatre of conflict in the Seven Years' War, witnessing the Battle of Cuddalore in 1758 between the French and British. It has been a part of independent India since 1947. During the 2004 Indian Ocean earthquake and tsunami, Cuddalore was one of the affected towns, with 572 recorded casualties.

Apart from fishing and port-related industries, Cuddalore houses chemical, pharmacological and energy industries in SIPCOT, an industrial estate set up by the state government. The city is administered by municipal corporation covering 101.6 km^{2} . It had a population of 308,781 in 2011. Cuddalore is a part of the Cuddalore legislative assembly constituency, which is a part of the Cuddalore Lok Sabha constituency. There are 25 schools, two science colleges and two engineering colleges in the city. There is one government hospital, six municipal maternity homes, and 42 other private hospitals that take care of the citizens' healthcare needs. Roadways are the primary means of transportation, while the town also has rail connectivity. The nearest airport is in Pondicherry Airport, located at 24 km (15 mi) away and the nearest international airport is Chennai International Airport, located 179 km (112 mi) away from the city, and another local airport is located in the district at Neyveli township is Neyveli Airport. The nearest seaport is Cuddalore Port where it handles small cargo ships, and the construction of port entry is underway. The closest major seaport is Karaikal port, located 100 km (62 mi) away from the town. Cuddalore is famous for its educational institutions and medical establishments.

== Etymology ==
Before the English took control, Cuddalore (anglicised) was called கூடலூர், Kūṭalūr meaning confluence in Tamil. It is situated on the backwater formed by the confluent estuaries of the rivers viz., Ponnaiyar (South Pennar river flowing through Karnataka and Tamil Nadu), Kedilam, Uppanar and Paravanar. The Cuddalore district historically consisted of Chola Nadu and Nadu Naadu. The name Nadu Naadu meaning middle country may originate from its location between Chola Nadu and Tondaimandalam; or between the Pallavas and the Cholas; or between central territories and the ocean.

== History ==
From ancient times the old town has been a seaport. For two centuries, Cuddalore was subject to the rule of several European powers, including the Dutch, Portuguese, French and British. In 1758 Cuddalore was under British control. Later, Britain ruled a significant part of South India (entire Tamil Nadu, parts of present Andhra Pradesh, Kerala and Karnataka) from this fort (St. David). In the early 17th century, the Dutch obtained permission from the ruler of Cuddalore to build a fort there, but political pressure from their Portuguese rivals forced them to abandon it. Later, the French and English came to Cuddalore for trade and business. The French established a trading post 16 kilometres (10 mi) up the coast at Pondicherry in 1674, followed in 1690 Fort St. David by the British at Cuddalore.

During the 18th century, various wars between the European powers spilt over to their colonial empires, and their allies, including those in the Indian subcontinent. During this period the French and British fought several times in the area. In 1746, during First Carnatic War, part of the Austrian Succession War, French forces besieged the British at Fort St. David for several months before being driven off in 1747.

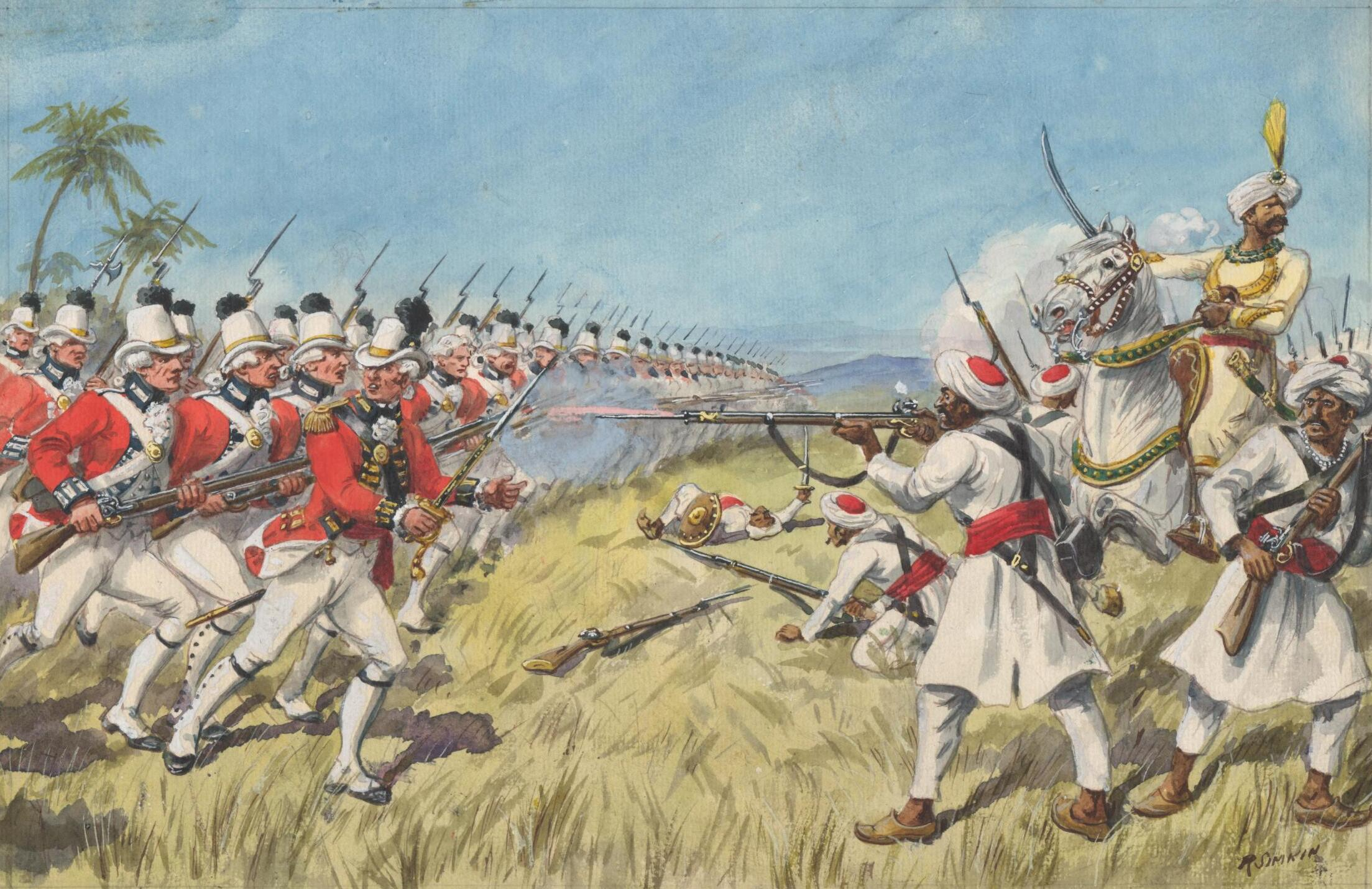
The siege of Cuddalore in 1783

In 1758, during the Seven Years' War, the French took the fort, and there was an inconclusive naval action, the Battle of Cuddalore, off the coast. The fort was later abandoned, in 1760, when the British attacked Pondicherry. In 1782, during the Second Anglo-Mysore War, the French again took Cuddalore at the time of the American War of Independence and were besieged there in 1783 by the British. During the siege French and British naval forces again clashed off the Cuddalore coast. The siege failed, but the fort was returned to the British in 1795. There were five different naval actions off the coast during this period, all of which were indecisive.

Some Cuddalore streets retain their British names, such as Clive Street, Wellington Street, Sloper Street, Canning Street, Rope Street (Rope Street, Wellington Street, Sloper Street and Canning Street jointly known as Salangukara Village), Lawrence Road and Imperial Road. The Cuddalore Central Prison, opened in 1865, is a historically significant landmark. Subramania Bharati and other political leaders served prison terms there. Tsunami waves that followed the 2004 Indian Ocean earthquake near Sumatra hit India's eastern coast on 26 December 2004 at 8:32 a.m. (IST), resulting in 572 casualties. Several fishing hamlets disappeared, while Silver Beach and the historically significant Cuddalore Port was devastated. Fort St. David survived without damage. On 30 December 2011, Cyclone Thane caused widespread damage to crops and buildings.

== Geography ==
Cuddalore is located at 11°45′N 79°45′E / 11.75°N 79.75°E / 11.75; 79.75. It has an average elevation of 6 m (20 ft). The land is completely flat with large black and alluvial soil inland and coarse sand near the seashore. The sandstone deposits in the town are popular. The Pennayar River runs north of the town, while Gadilam River runs across it. Cuddalore is situated at 200 km (120 mi) from the state capital Chennai and 18 km (11 mi) from Puducherry, the neighbouring union territory. The city is nearly equidistant from the Tropic of Cancer and the Equator.

== Geology ==
The Cuddalore Formation of the Cauvery Basin received siliciclastic detritus from inland areas of the Southern Granulite Terrain (SGT). It represented continental–fluvial sedimentation in the eastern continental margin of South India during the Miocene. Indian Summer Monsoon was thought to be initiated in the early Miocene and intensified during the middle Miocene causing major climatic shifts in the Indian subcontinent. In the present work, detailed mineralogical and geochemical studies on the siliciclastic Cuddalore Formation have been carried out to understand the provenance and paleoclimatic conditions during the Miocene. The paleocurrent direction, textural immaturity and framework detrital modes of sandstones suggest rapid uplift of basement and sediment source from nearby Madras Block of SGT. Various diagnostic immobile trace element ratios such as Th/Sc, Co/Th, La/Sc, La/Co suggest a tonalite–trondhjemite–granodiorite–charnockite provenance, and somewhat more felsic composition of source area compared to the present upper continental crust (UCC).

=== Climate ===
Cuddalore experiences a tropical wet and dry climate (As) under the Köppen climate classification. Cuddalore witnesses heavy rainfall during the North-East monsoon. The weather is pleasant from December to February in Cuddalore, with a climate full of warm days and cool nights. The onset of summer is from March, with the mercury reaching its peak by the end of May and June. The average temperatures range from 37 °C (99 °F) in January to 22.5 °C (72.5 °F) in May and June. Summer rains are sparse and the first monsoon, the South-West monsoon, sets in June and continues till September. North-East monsoon sets in October and continues till January. The rainfall during the South-West monsoon period is much lower than that of North-East monsoon. The average rainfall is 1,400 mm (55 in), most of which is contributed by the North-East monsoon. The highest 24-hour rainfall recorded in Cuddalore was 570 mm on 18 May 1943.

Climate data for Cuddalore (1991–2020, extremes 1901–2020)
| Month | Jan | Feb | Mar | Apr | May | Jun | Jul | Aug | Sep | Oct | Nov | Dec | Year |
|---|---|---|---|---|---|---|---|---|---|---|---|---|---|
| Record high °C (°F) | 33.4 (92.1) | 36.1 (97.0) | 38.9 (102.0) | 42.2 (108.0) | 43.3 (109.9) | 42.8 (109.0) | 40.7 (105.3) | 40.0 (104.0) | 39.3 (102.7) | 38.9 (102.0) | 35.0 (95.0) | 35.0 (95.0) | 43.3 (109.9) |
| Mean daily maximum °C (°F) | 29.7 (85.5) | 31.0 (87.8) | 32.7 (90.9) | 34.5 (94.1) | 36.9 (98.4) | 37.0 (98.6) | 35.9 (96.6) | 35.1 (95.2) | 34.2 (93.6) | 32.2 (90.0) | 30.0 (86.0) | 29.1 (84.4) | 33.2 (91.8) |
| Daily mean °C (°F) | 25.2 (77.4) | 26.3 (79.3) | 28.1 (82.6) | 30.2 (86.4) | 31.4 (88.5) | 31.2 (88.2) | 30.4 (86.7) | 29.8 (85.6) | 29.3 (84.7) | 28.0 (82.4) | 26.5 (79.7) | 25.4 (77.7) | 28.5 (83.3) |
| Mean daily minimum °C (°F) | 20.8 (69.4) | 21.5 (70.7) | 23.3 (73.9) | 25.9 (78.6) | 26.9 (80.4) | 26.5 (79.7) | 25.8 (78.4) | 25.4 (77.7) | 25.2 (77.4) | 24.5 (76.1) | 23.1 (73.6) | 21.7 (71.1) | 24.2 (75.6) |
| Record low °C (°F) | 13.3 (55.9) | 14.3 (57.7) | 16.1 (61.0) | 19.4 (66.9) | 20.3 (68.5) | 20.7 (69.3) | 18.9 (66.0) | 20.6 (69.1) | 19.2 (66.6) | 18.9 (66.0) | 16.7 (62.1) | 11.1 (52.0) | 11.1 (52.0) |
| Average rainfall mm (inches) | 26.2 (1.03) | 13.6 (0.54) | 15.1 (0.59) | 19.8 (0.78) | 49.8 (1.96) | 53.9 (2.12) | 62.6 (2.46) | 118.2 (4.65) | 112.7 (4.44) | 272.3 (10.72) | 389.5 (15.33) | 236.1 (9.30) | 1,369.6 (53.92) |
| Average rainy days | 1.3 | 0.8 | 0.4 | 1.0 | 2.1 | 2.9 | 4.0 | 5.7 | 5.8 | 9.9 | 12.2 | 6.4 | 52.4 |
| Average relative humidity (%) (at 17:30 IST) | 71 | 70 | 71 | 73 | 73 | 66 | 64 | 68 | 74 | 78 | 80 | 76 | 72 |
Source 1: India Meteorological Department
Source 2: Tokyo Climate Center (mean temperatures 1991–2020)

== Demographics ==
Religious census
| Religion | Percent(%) |
| Hindu | 89.12% |
| Muslim | 6.09% |
| Christian | 3.98% |
| Jain | 0.27% |
| Sikh | 0.02% |
| Buddhist | 0.02% |
| Other | 0.48% |
| No religion | 0.25% |

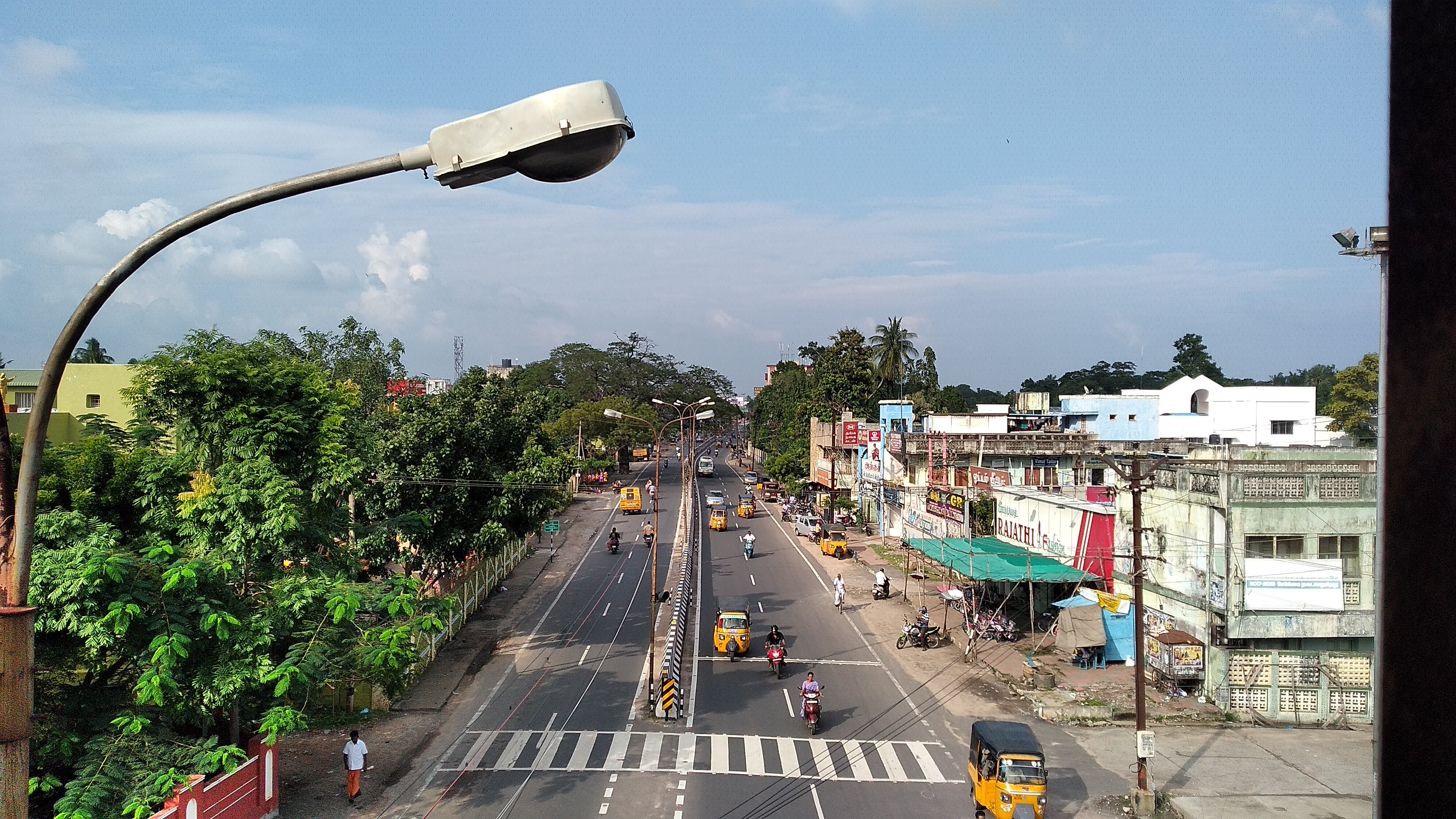
Cuddalore City

According to 2011 census, Cuddalore had a population of 173,636 with a sex-ratio of 1,026 females for every 1,000 males, much above the national average of 929. A total of 17,403 were under the age of six, constituting 8,869 males and 8,534 females. Scheduled Castes and Scheduled Tribes accounted for 13.22% and 0.3% of the population respectively. The average literacy of the city was 78.92%, compared to the national average of 72.99%. The city had a total of 42,174 households. There were a total of 62,115 workers, comprising 561 cultivators, 1,856 main agricultural labourers, 1,464 in household industries, 48,337 other workers, 9,897 marginal workers, 139 marginal cultivators, 952 marginal agricultural labourers, 771 marginal workers in household industries and 8,035 other marginal workers.

As of 2007, a total of 1,665 ha (4,110 acres) (11.5%) of the land was used for residential, 122 ha (300 acres) (0.8%) for commercial, 400 ha (990 acres) (2.7%) for industrial, 195 ha (480 acres) (1.4%) for public and semi public purposes and 120 ha (300 acres) (0.8%) for educational purposes. Out of the undeveloped land area, 3,089 ha (7,630 acres) (21.3%) is under land and water, 7,296.97 ha (18,031.2 acres) (50.5%) of the area is used for agricultural purposes, 770 ha (1,900 acres) (5.4%) is vacant land in quarries and hillocks and 810 ha (2,000 acres) (5.6%) for transport and communication. As of 2008, there were 29 notified slums, with 59,075 comprising 37.23% of the total population residing in those.

As per the religious census of 2011, Cuddalore had 89.12% Hindus, 6.09% Muslims, 3.98% Christians, 0.02% Sikhs, 0.02% Buddhists, 0.27% Jains, 0.48% following other religions and 0.01% following no religion or did not indicate any religious preference.

== Transport ==
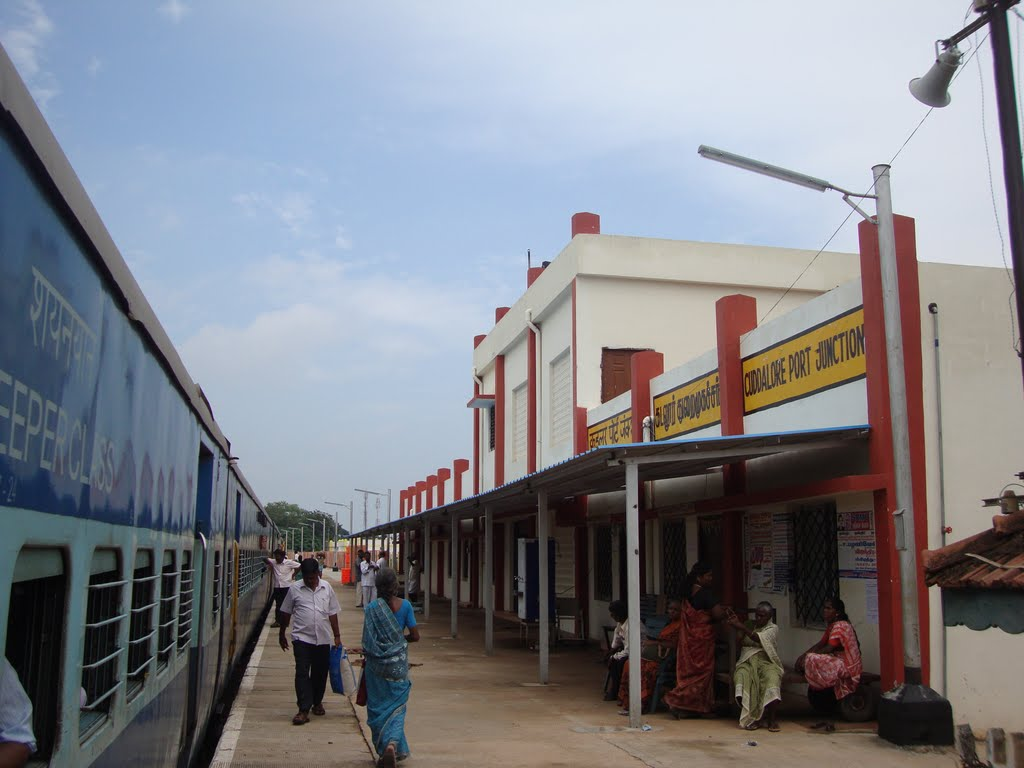
Cuddalore Port Junction

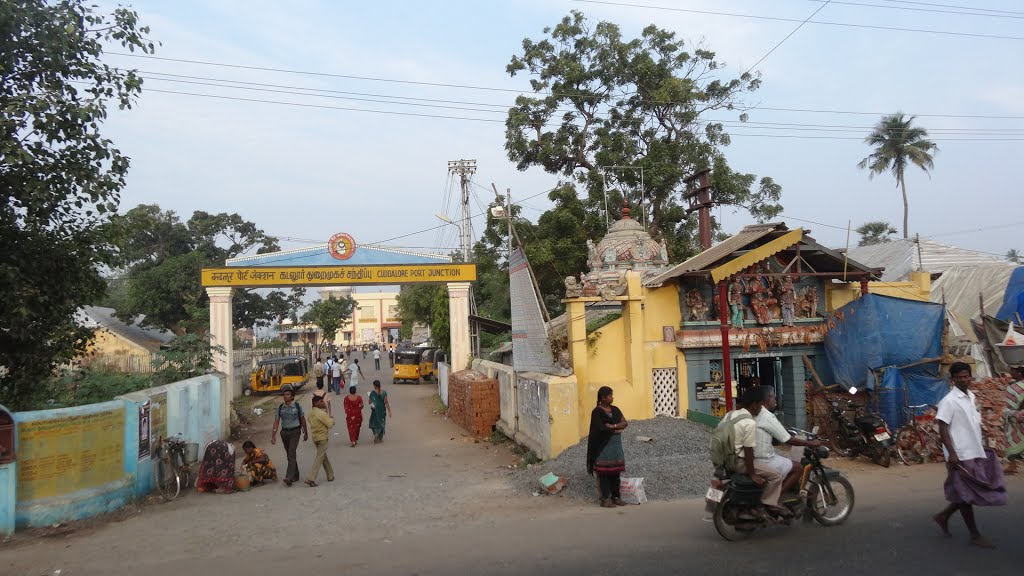
Entrance to the Cudalore Port

Cuddalore has Three major railway stations, namely, Cuddalore Port Junction and Tiruppadirippuliyur Cuddalore Castle, Varakalpattu Cuddalore Moffusil both on the Viluppuram–Mayiladuthurai–Tiruchirappalli Mainline Section. The Cuddalore Port Junction has a branch to Virudhachalam Junction railway station via Neyveli, Vadalur. Cuddalore Port Junction has four platforms and one stabling line used more for handling freight trains. Tiruppadirippuliyur Cuddalore Castle, the other important railway station of Cuddalore has two platforms and is located close to the Cuddalore bus stand. There are express and passenger trains on either side, connecting various cities with Tamil Nadu. There are daily express trains to many cities.

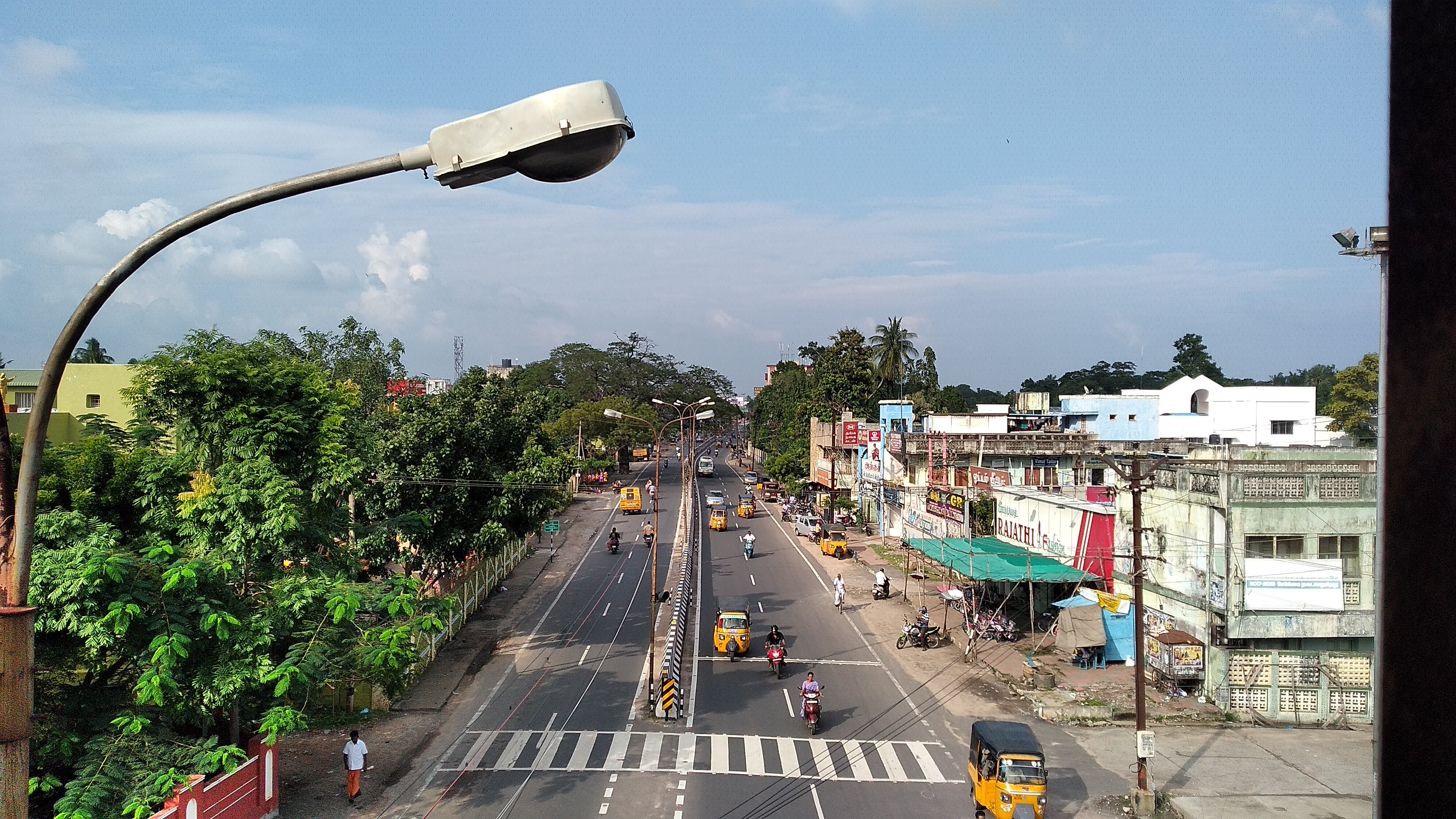
A road in Cuddalore

There is 230 km (140 mi) of roads in the town, out of which the Highways department maintains 26 km (16 mi). The Cuddalore City maintains a total of 204.94 km (127.34 mi) of roads: 38.84 km (24.13 mi) of concrete roads, 163.6 km (101.7 mi) of bituminous roads, 1.62 km (1.01 mi) of water-bound macadam (WBM) roads and 0.85 km (0.53 mi) of earthen roads. The National Highways, NH-32 Viluppuram–Pondicherry–Cuddalore–Chidambaram–Nagapattinam–Thoothukudi Highway passes through Cuddalore. Cuddalore is served by a town bus service, which provides connectivity within the town and the suburbs. There are privately operated mini-bus services that cater to local transport needs. The main bus stand is located in Thirupapuliyur.

The nearest airport is in Pondicherry, approximately 25 km (16 mi) from Cuddalore, while the nearest international airport is Chennai International Airport, located 200 km (120 mi) from the town. There is an airport finished its construction and waiting for the opening in Neyveli, which is nearly 30 km (19 mi) from Cuddalore. Daily flights to Chennai is going to be operated by Air Odisha.

The town is served by Cuddalore Port, a minor port. This port mainly handles cargo and is in close vicinity to Cuddalore Port Junction.

== Economy ==
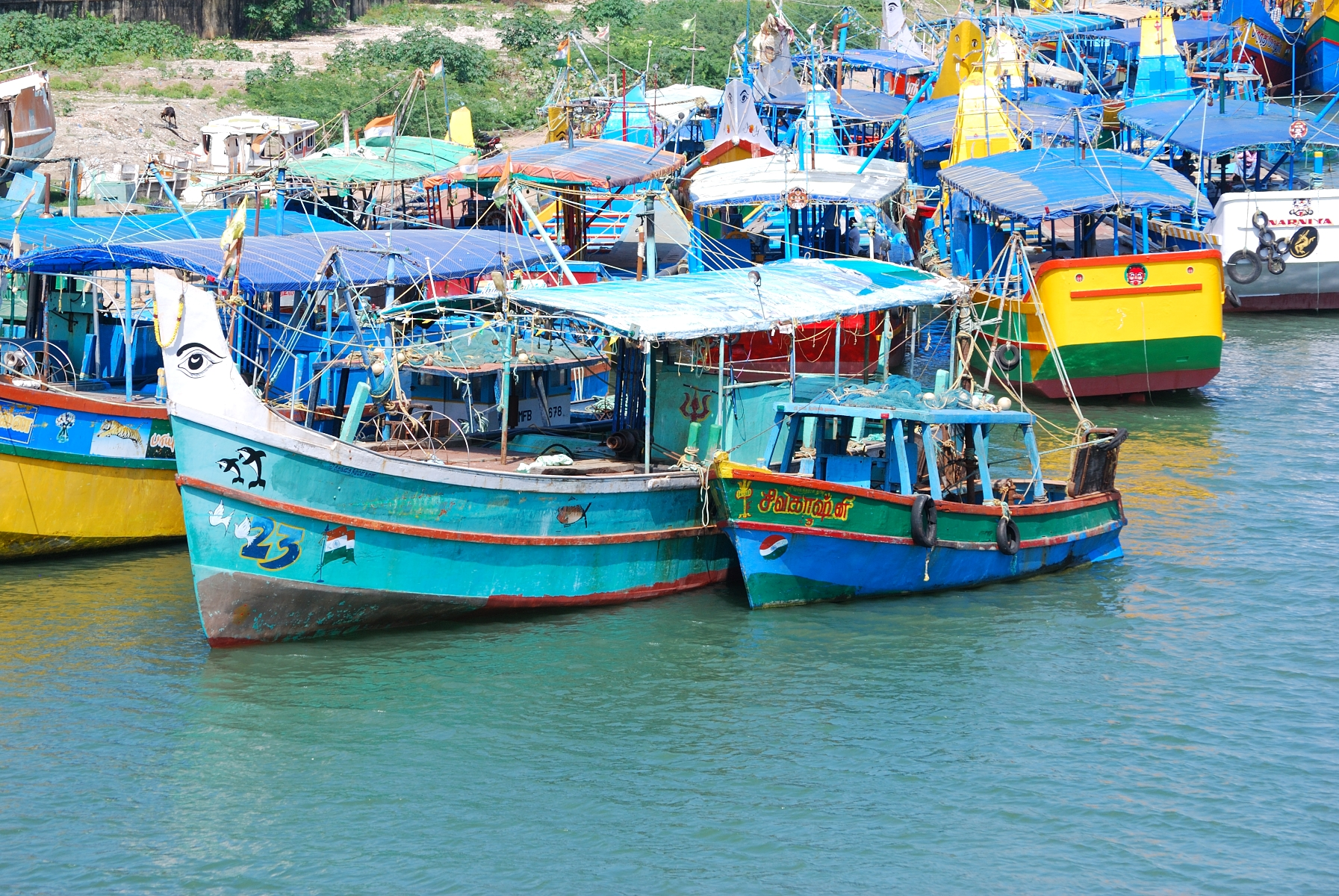
Fishing boats in Cuddalore

Being a coastal town, historically, Cuddalore's primary industry was fishing. Although Cuddalore was once a port town, the shipping trade has now moved to larger centres. Cuddalore also hosts the heavy chemical, pharmacological and energy industries in SIPCOT, an industrial estate set up by the state government. The National Thermal Power Corporation (NTPC) and Tamil Nadu Electricity Board (TNEB) planned to commence power plants around the town.

The industrial development in Cuddalore's recent past has resulted in extreme pollution. SIPCOT, the central industrial area in the town is a "global toxic hotspot." Local communities have voiced concern about industrialization and pollution. The SIPCOT chemical industry estate in Cuddalore was investigated in November 2002 by a team from the Indian People's Tribunal headed by J. Kanakaraj. The group reported "a noticeable stench of chemicals in the air". The report published in July 2003 noted that "Villages like Kudikadu, Thaikal, Eachangadu and Sonnanchavadi lie in a virtual 'gas chamber' surrounded on three sides by chemical factories and bounded on the fourth by the river". There are reports of illegal dumping of toxic waste. On 22 March 2008, a report for the "Tamil Nadu Pollution Board" prepared by the Nagpur-based "National Environmental Engineering Research Institute" found that residents of the SIPCOT area of Cuddalore were at least 2000 times more likely than their counterparts to contract cancer in their lifetimes due to exposure to high levels of toxic gases from chemical industries in the region.

The Cuddalore Port operates at the confluence of the Gadilam River and the Paravanar River. The ships anchor in midstream at about 1.5 kilometres (1 mi) from the shore, where cargo is loaded and discharged through lighters. There is a bar at the mouth of the combined river, which maintains a depth of 1.5–1.8 metres (5–6 ft) at low water. During July to September, the depth over the bar is reduced to about 0.91–1.22 m (3–4 ft). Other ports under construction in Cuddalore are Thiruchopuram port, Silambimangalam port, Parangipettai port (Porto Nova) and PY-03 Oil Field (operational).

== Education ==
There are a total of more than ten schools, including both matriculation and CBSE in Cuddalore.

Schools

- CSI St Davids Matriculation School in Cuddalore
- St. David's Higher Secondary School, Cuddalore Port (O.T)
- Sri Saraswathi Vidhyaalaya Matriculation School
- St. Joseph's Higher Secondary School - Cuddalore
- St. Mary's
- ARLM
- Krishnasamy
- St. Anne's
- Crescent Primary and Nursery School
- CK
- Akshara Vidyaashram

Arts & Science Colleges

- Periyar Arts College
- Immaculate college for women
- St. Joseph Arts & Science College
- C. Kandasamy Naidu College for Women (KNC).

Engineering Colleges

- Krishnasamy Memorial Engineering College
- CK College of Engineering and Technology.

Polytechnic Colleges

- Krishnasamy Memorial Polytechnic
- Padaleeswarar Polytechnic

Industrial Training Institutes

There are six Industrial Training Institutes (ITI) in the town, two of which are operated by the government.

== Utilities ==
Electricity

Electricity supply to Cuddalore is regulated and distributed by the Tamil Nadu Electricity Board (TNEB). The town and its suburbs form the Cuddalore Electricity Distribution Circle. A chief distribution engineer is stationed at the regional headquarters.

Water Supply

Water supply is provided to the town by the Cuddalore municipality from three sources: Pennaiyar River, borewells from Caper Hills and Thirvanthipuram. The water from the sources is stored in ten overhead tanks located in various parts of the town. During the period 2000–01, 6.065 million litres of water was supplied every day to households in the town.

Sewage & Drainage

About 103 tonnes of solid waste are collected from Cuddalore every day by door-to-door collection. Subsequently, the sanitary department of the Cuddalore municipality carries out the source segregation and dumping. The coverage of solid waste management had an efficiency of 100 per cent as of 2001. There is no underground drainage system in the town, and the sewerage system for disposal of sullage is through septic tanks, open drains and public conveniences. The municipality maintains stormwater drains for 65 km (40 mi), covering 32% of municipal roads.

Hospitals

There is one government hospital, six municipal maternity homes, and 37 other private hospitals that take care of the citizens' healthcare needs.

Lights

There are 4,517 street lamps in the town: 275 sodium lamps, 201 mercury vapour lamps and 4,041 tube lights.

=== Markets ===
The municipality operates five markets, namely, Aringar Anna Daily Market at Manjakuppam, Banbari Daily Market at Thirupapuliyur, Bakthavachalam Daily Market at Cuddalore OT, Pudupalayam Daily Market at Pudupalayam and Devanampattinam Daily Market at Devanampattinam, that cater to the needs of the town and the surrounding rural areas.

== Administration and politics ==
Municipal Corporation Officials
| Mayor | Sundari |
| Corporation Commissioner | Viswanathan |
Elected members
| Member of Legislative Assembly | B. Rajkumar |
| Member of Parliament | M. K. Vishnu Prasad |

The Cuddalore municipality was established in 1866 during British times as a revenue village. It was promoted to a selection-grade municipal municipality in 1991 and special grade in 2008. The municipality has 45 wards, and there is an elected councillor for each of those wards. The municipality's functions are devolved into six departments: general administration/personnel, Engineering, Revenue, Public Health, city planning and Information Technology (IT). All these departments are under the control of a Municipal Commissioner who is the executive head. The legislative powers are vested in a body of 45 members, one each from the 45 wards. The legislative body is headed by an elected Chairperson assisted by a Deputy Chairperson.

Cuddalore comes under the Cuddalore assembly constituency. It elects a member to the Tamil Nadu Legislative Assembly once every five years. From the 1977 elections, the assembly seat was won by Dravida Munnetra Kazhagam (DMK) five times during the 1980, 1989, 1996, 2001 and 2006 elections, the Indian National Congress party two times during the 1984 and 1991 elections and the All India Anna Dravida Munnetra Kazhagam (ADMK) twice during the 1997 and 2011 elections. The current MLA of the constituency is B. Rajkumar from TVK.

During the 2009 general elections, Cuddalore was a part of Cuddalore (Lok Sabha constituency) with six assembly segments: Tittakudi (SC), Vridhachalam, Neyveli, Cuddalore, Panruti and Kurinjipadi. Before 2009, Cuddalore Lok Sabha constituency composed of the following assembly segments: Ulundurpet (SC), Nellikkuppam, Cuddalore, Panruti, Rishivandinam and Sankarapuram. The Lok Sabha seat has been held by the Indian National Congress for eight terms during 1951–56, 1971–77, 1977–80. 1980–84, 1984–1989, 1989–91, 1991–96, and 2009–present, Dravida Munnetra Kazhagam for four times during 1962–1967, 1967–71, 1999–04, and 2004–09, Anna Dravida Munnetra Kazhagam twice during 1998–99 and 2014, Tamil Maanila Congress once during 1996–2001 and an independent during 1957–62, The current Member of Parliament from the constituency is M. K. Vishnu Prasad from the INC.

The town's law and order is maintained by the Cuddalore sub division of the Tamil Nadu Police headed by a deputy superintendent (DSP). There are four police stations in the town located in NT, Thirupapuliyur, Cuddalore OT and Cuddalore Port. There are select units like prohibition enforcement, district crime, social justice and human rights, district crime records and a select branch that operate at the district level police division headed by a Superintendent of Police (SP).

On 24 August 2021, the state government announced the upgrading of the Cuddalore Greater Municipality to "Cuddalore City Municipal Corporation" with same authority area of 27.69 sq km^{2}.

In May 2023, A. Arun Thamburaj, I.A.S assumed his office as the District collector of Cuddalore.

== Tourism ==
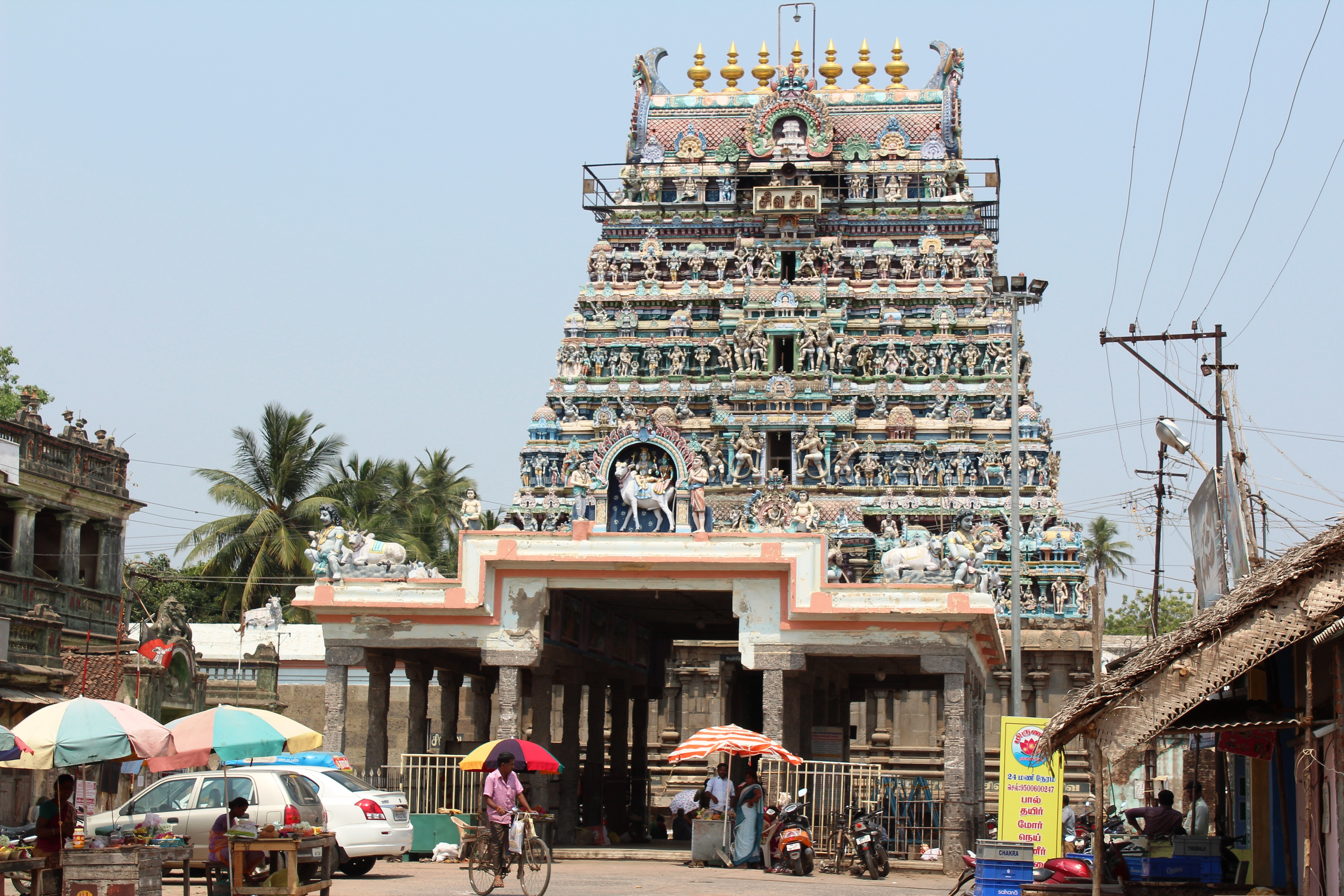
Padaleeshwarar temple

Pataleeswarar Temple, a Hindu temple, built during the 7th century and dated a millennium earlier, is the most prominent landmark in Cuddalore. The name, Thirupathipuliyur, is associated with the legend behind the temple. The temple is revered in the verses of 7th-century Saiva saints Appar and Tirugnanasambandar in their works in Tevaram.

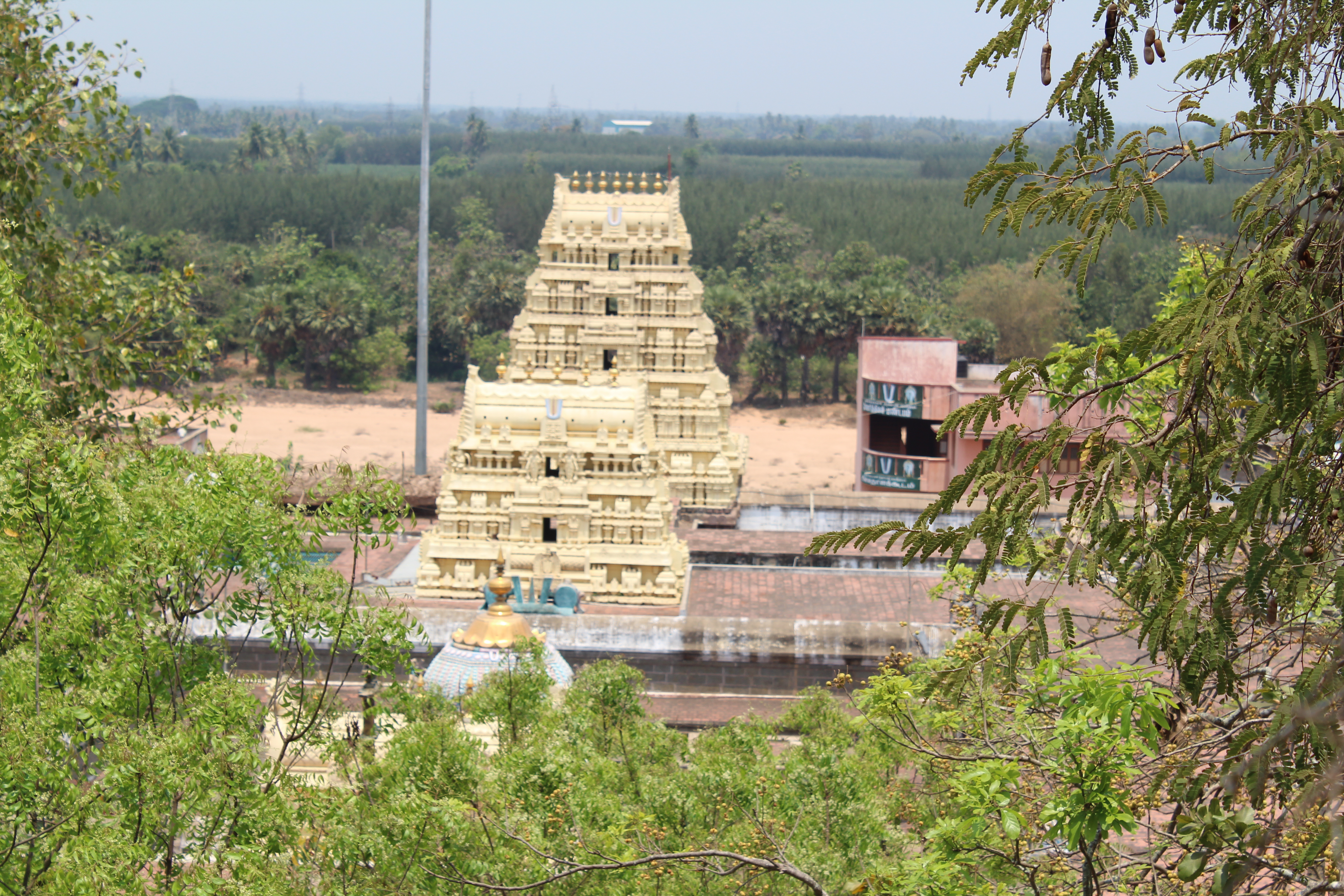
Devanathaswamy temple

The Devanathaswami Temple, located in Thiruvanthipuram, is another Hindu pilgrimage site around Cuddalore.

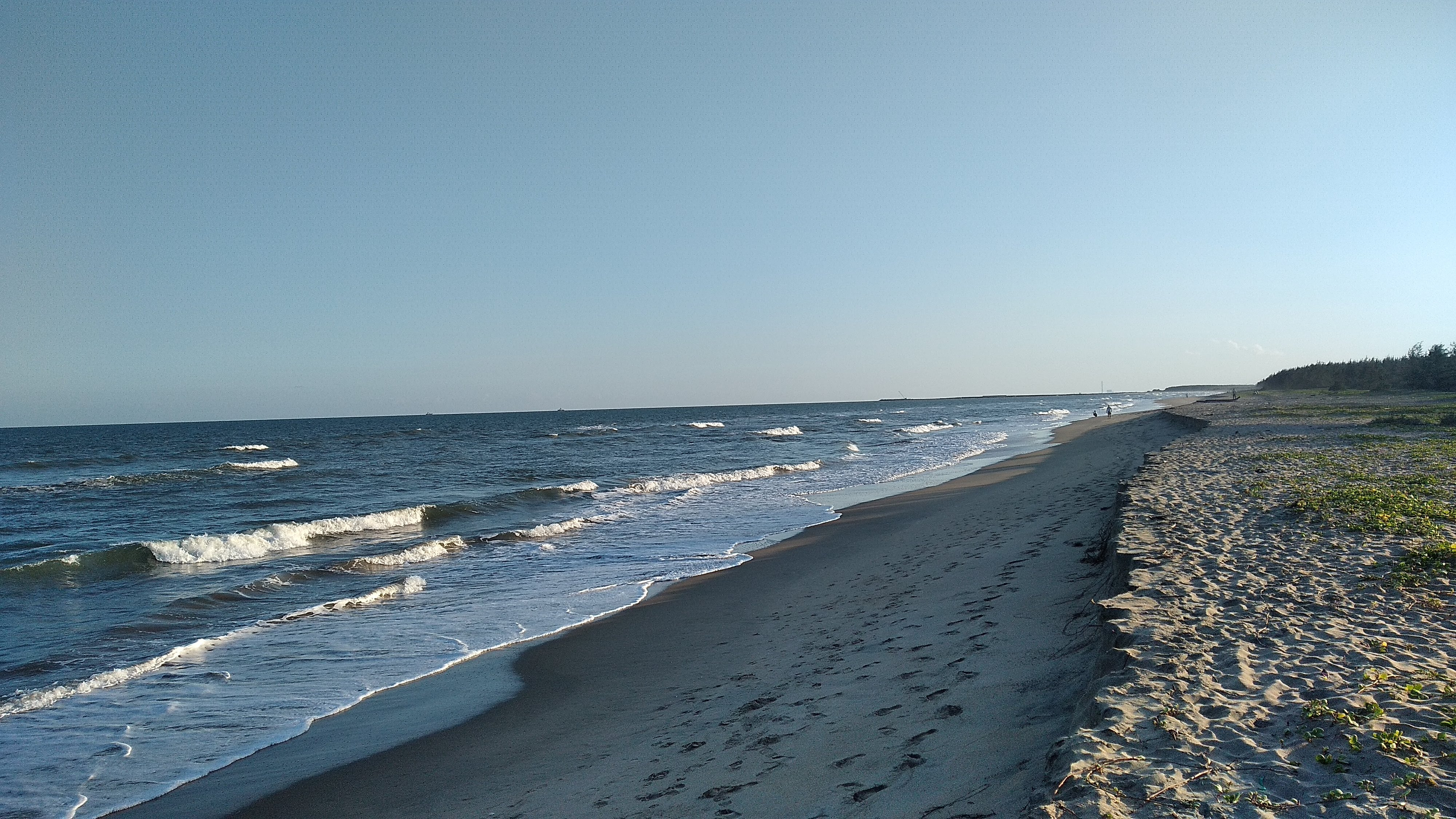
Silver Beach

Silver Beach is a 2 km (1.2 mi) long blue Flag Beach located in Cuddalore and is another prominent visitor attraction of the town. Pichavaram, which is 57 km from Cuddalore, is a mangrove forest.

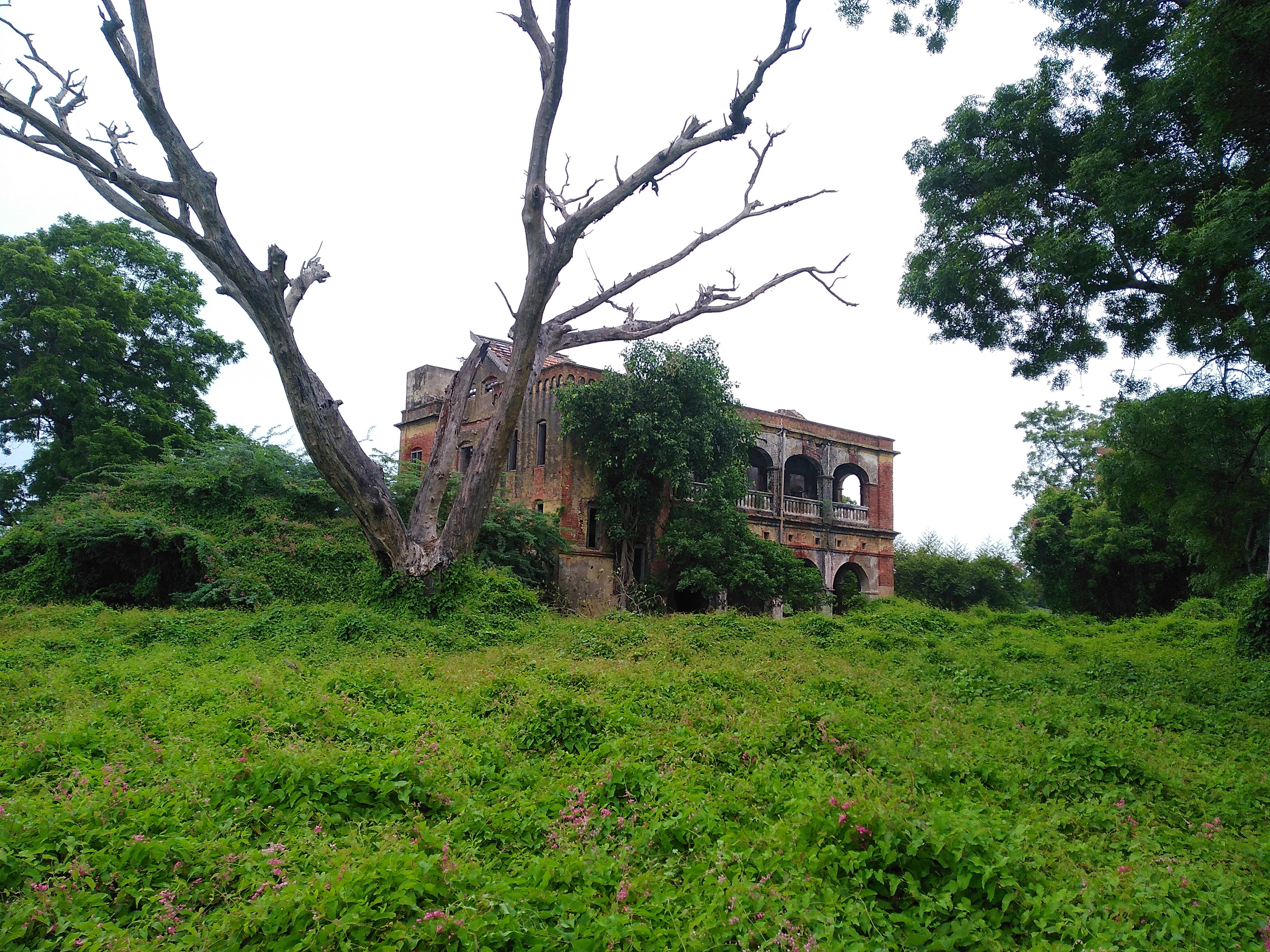
Fort St.David

Fort St David, situated on the River Gadilam near Devanampattinam and acquired in 1653 CE by Elihu Yale, a Christian slave-trader and cruel slave master, is one of the most visited tourist attraction in Cuddalore. The wealth embezzled and extracted by him was infused into Yale University. Only two decades later, in 1677, when Shivaji captured Gingee, the fort fell into the Marathas' hands. In 1690, the British East India Company purchased the fort and the adjacent villages (within "ye randome shott of a piece of ordnance".) A great gun was fired to different points of the compass. All the country within its range, including the town of Cuddalore, passed into English possession. The villages thus obtained are called "cannonball villages". The fortifications were strengthened in 1693, 1698, 1702, 1725, 1740 and 1745. In 1746 Fort St. David became the British headquarters for British India. The British ruled a more significant part of south India (Tamil Nadu, parts of the present- Andhra Pradesh, Kerala and Karnataka) from Fort St. David. An attack by Dupleix was successfully repulsed. In 1756, Clive was appointed governor. The French captured the fort in 1758 but in 1760 relinquished it to Sir Eyre Coote of the British East India Company. The French recaptured the fort in 1782 and held it in 1783 during the Battle of Cuddalore. In 1785 the fort passed into British possession. By this time, however, the centre of British rule was Fort St George.

The Garden House was the official residence of the Cuddalore District Collector, Robert Clive. It is typical of later medieval architecture. The Garden House roof was built using only bricks and slaked lime with no steel and wood.

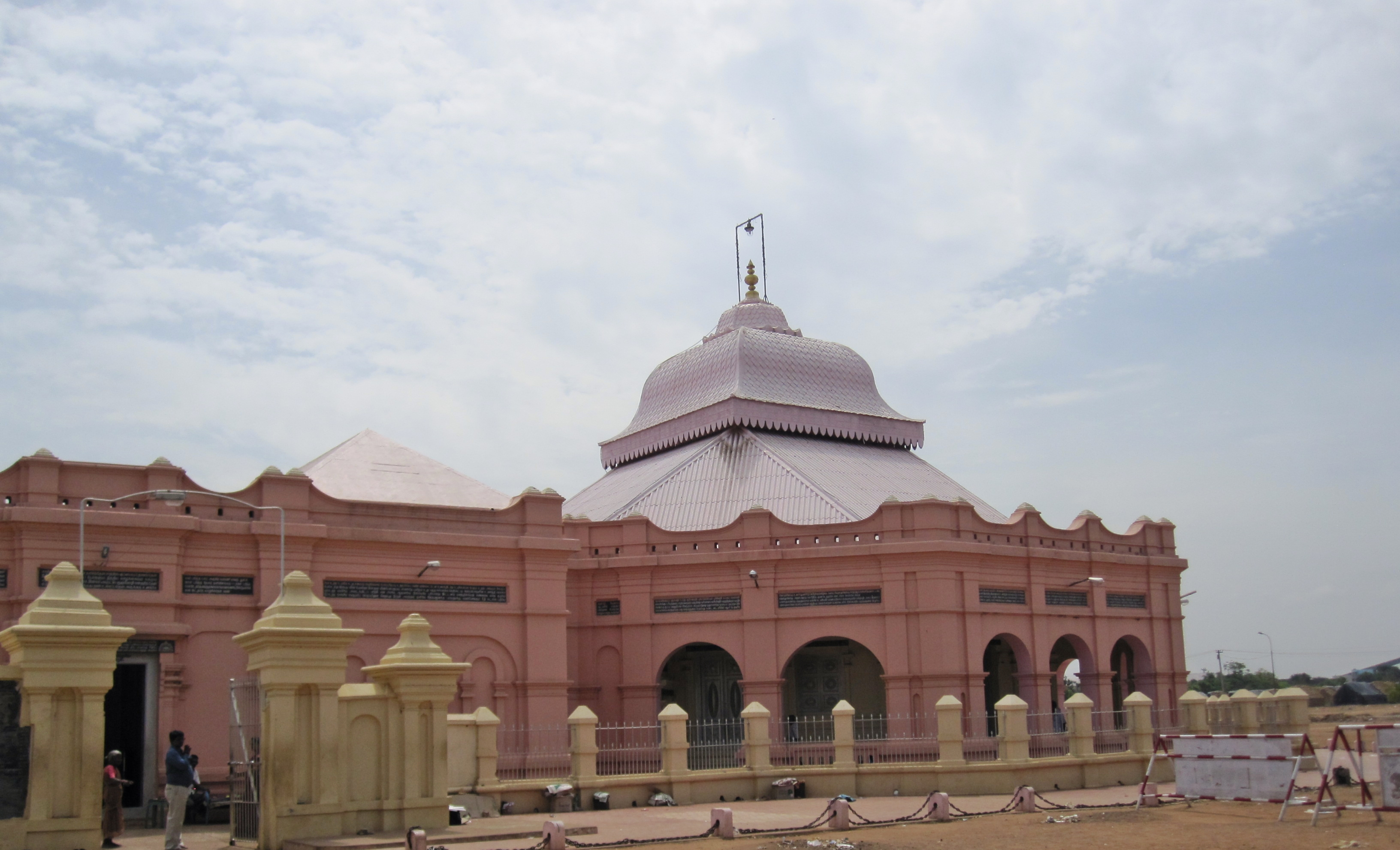
Satyagnana sabha

Satyagnana Sabha (சத்ய ஞான சபை, literally "Temple of Wisdom") is a temple constructed by saint Sri Raamalinga Swaamigal (Vallalaar) in the town of Vadalur in Cuddalore district, Tamil Nadu, India on 25 January 1872. It is an octagonal structure; the sanctum sanctorum of this temple is concealed from the main hall by seven curtains which are parted only on the Thai Poosam day. All the four towers of the Chidambaram Nataraajar temple are visible from the sabha. The temple is open year-round. Thousands of visitors attend festivals and monthly puja dates at this temple. Vadalur is well connected by rail and road, and it provides transport to major cities like Trichy, Chennai, Tanjore, Puducherry, and Kumbakonam.

== Notable person ==
- Anjalai Ammal, an Indian freedom fighter and social worker
- Jayakanthan
- Thangar Bachan
- Vetrimaaran

== More References ==
- Mohandoss, Krishnamoorthy (2007). World Famous personality living in village: A-E. Greenwood Publishing Group. ISBN 9780313335372.
- Urban Infrastructure report (2007). Conversion of City Corporate Plan into Business Plan (PDF) (Report). Tamilnadu Urban Infrastructure Financial Services Limited. Archived from the original (PDF) on 21 October 2013.
