= State Highway 26 (Tamil Nadu) =

Road in Tamil Nadu, India

State Highway 26

Route information
- Maintained by Highways and Minor Ports Department
- Length: 124 km (77 mi)

Major junctions
- From: Tiruchirappalli, Tamil Nadu
- To: Mimisal, Pudukkottai district, Tamil Nadu

Location
- Country: India
- State: Tamil Nadu
- Districts: Trichy, Pudukkottai

Highway system
- Roads in India; Expressways; National; State; Asian; State Highways in Tamil Nadu
← SH 25	→ SH 30

Tamil Nadu State Highway 26 (SH-26) is a State Highway maintained by the Highways Department of Government of Tamil Nadu. It connects Trichy with Mimisal in the south – eastern part of Tamil Nadu.

== Route ==
The total length of the SH-26 is 124 kilometres (77 mi). The route is from Trichy-Mimisal, via Pudukkottai and Aranthangi.

== See also ==
- Highways of Tamil Nadu
