= Transport in Cuddalore =

Cuddalore is connected to other parts of Tamil Nadu through rail and road networks. Frequent buses run to nearby towns. Roads include:

- National Highway NH 32 (Chennai - Tindivanam - Pondicherry - Cuddalore - Chidambaram - Nagapattinam - Velankanni - Thondi - Ramanathapuram - Sayalkudi - Thoothukudi Highway) passes through Cuddalore.
- Three state highways connected to other parts of Tamil Nadu:

- SH-9, (the Cuddalore–Nellikuppam–Melpattampakkam–Panruti–Madapattu–Thirukovilur–Tiruvannamalai–Polur–Vellore–Katpadi–Chittoor road)
- NH-532, (the Cuddalore-Vadalur-Neyveli-Vriddhachalam-Veppur-Salem Road)
- SH-68, (the Cuddalore-Thiruvanthipuram-Palur-Panruti-Arasur-Thirukovilur-Sankarapuram Road)
