= State Highway 60 (Tamil Nadu) =

Highway in India

State Highway 60

Route information
- Maintained by Highways and Minor Ports Department

Major junctions
- From: Hogenakka, Dharmapuri district, Tamil Nadu
- To: Tirupattur, Tirupattur district, Tamil Nadu

Location
- Country: India
- State: Tamil Nadu
- Districts: Dharmapuri, Krishnagiri, Tirupattur

Highway system
- Roads in India; Expressways; National; State; Asian; State Highways in Tamil Nadu
| ← SH 58 | → SH 62 |

Tamil Nadu State Highway 60 (SH-60) connects Hogenakkal with Tirupattur.

== Route ==
The total length of SH-60 is 108.2 km.

== Junctions ==
SH-60 Route: Hogenakkal - Pennagaram - Dharmapuri - Pochampalli - Mathur - Tirupathur

== See also ==
- Highways of Tamil Nadu
