= State Highway 25 (Tamil Nadu) =

Road in Tamil Nadu, India

State Highway 25

Route information
- Maintained by Highways and Minor Ports Department
- Length: 77 km (48 mi)

Major junctions
- From: Tiruchirappalli, Tamil Nadu
- To: Namakkal, Namakkal district, Tamil Nadu

Location
- Country: India
- State: Tamil Nadu
- Districts: Trichy, Namakkal

Highway system
- Roads in India; Expressways; National; State; Asian; State Highways in Tamil Nadu
← SH 22	→ SH 26

Tamil Nadu State Highway 25 (SH-25) is a State Highway maintained by the Highways Department of the Government of Tamil Nadu. It connects Trichy with Namakkal Town in the north – western part of Tamil Nadu. It is one of the busiest State Highway in Tamil Nadu, which connects Bangalore, Mumbai, and Hyderabad from Trichy.

== Route ==
The total length of the SH-25 is 77 kilometres (48 mi). The route is from Tiruchirappalli - Namakkal, via Srirangam, Gunaseelam, Musiri, Thottiyam, Meikalnackanpatty, Vazhavanthi, Valaiyappatti, and Pudhupatti.

== See also ==
- Highways of Tamil Nadu
