= SH9 =

SH9 may refer to:

- Colorado State Highway 9
- State Highway 9 (Tamil Nadu)
- Oklahoma State Highway 9
- Texas State Highway 9
- Steve Howard
- The model code of the 3rd generation Subaru Forester

== See also ==
- List of highways numbered 9
