= Prasanna Venkatachalapathy Temple =

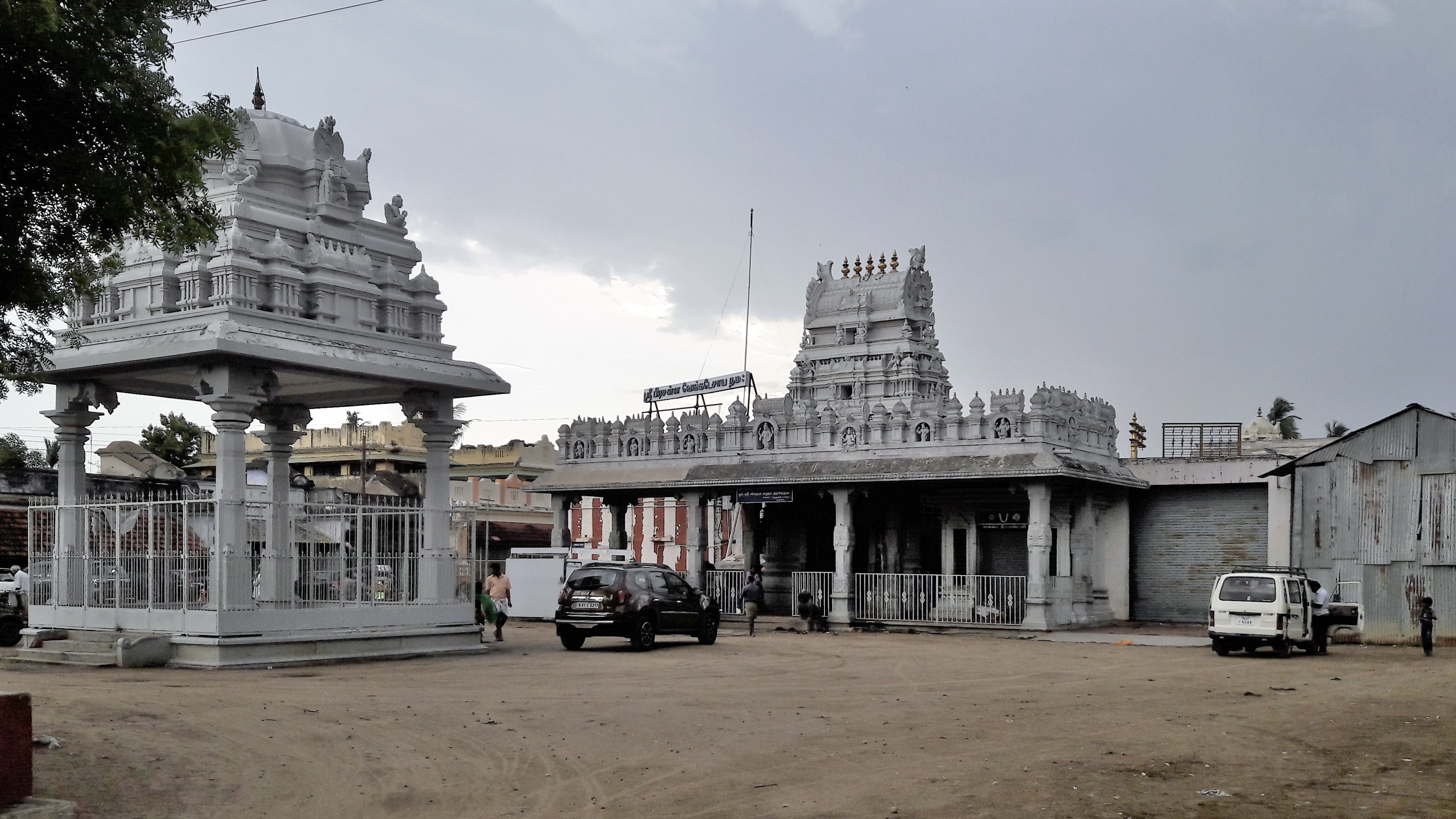
- Gunaseelam Temple Gopuram

- Location in Tamil Nadu

Religion
- Affiliation: Hinduism
- District: Tiruchirapalli
- Deity: Prasanna Venkatachalapathy (Vishnu)

Location
- Location: Gunaseelam
- State: Tamil Nadu
- Country: India
- Interactive map of Prasanna Venkatachalapathy Temple
- Coordinates: 10°54′7.37″N 78°34′4.00″E

Architecture
- Type: Dravidian architecture

Website
- http://gunaseelamtemple.com/

Gunaseelam Vishnu Temple (Abhimana Sthalam) is a Hindu temple dedicated to Vishnu located in Gunaseelam village, 20 km (12 mi) from Trichy, in the South Indian state of Tamil Nadu. It is located on the banks of river Kaveri. It is Classified one among the 108 Abhimana Kshethram of Vaishnavate tradition. A visit to the temple is believed to be a cure for the mentally challenged people, who are taken to the temple and kept in the temple premises for 48 days. At the end of the 48 days it is believed that their illness is cured by the grace of the presiding deity, Prasanna Venkatachalapathi. The temple has set up a mental health rehabilitation centre that has the official stamp of the Tamil Nadu Government license, the first of its kind in Tamil Nadu.

The temple has six daily rituals at various times from 6:30 a.m. to 8:30 p.m., and three yearly festivals on its calendar. The annual Brahmotsavam (prime festival) is an eleven-day festival attended by thousands of devotees from far and near. The temple is maintained by a hereditary executive trustee.

== Etymology ==
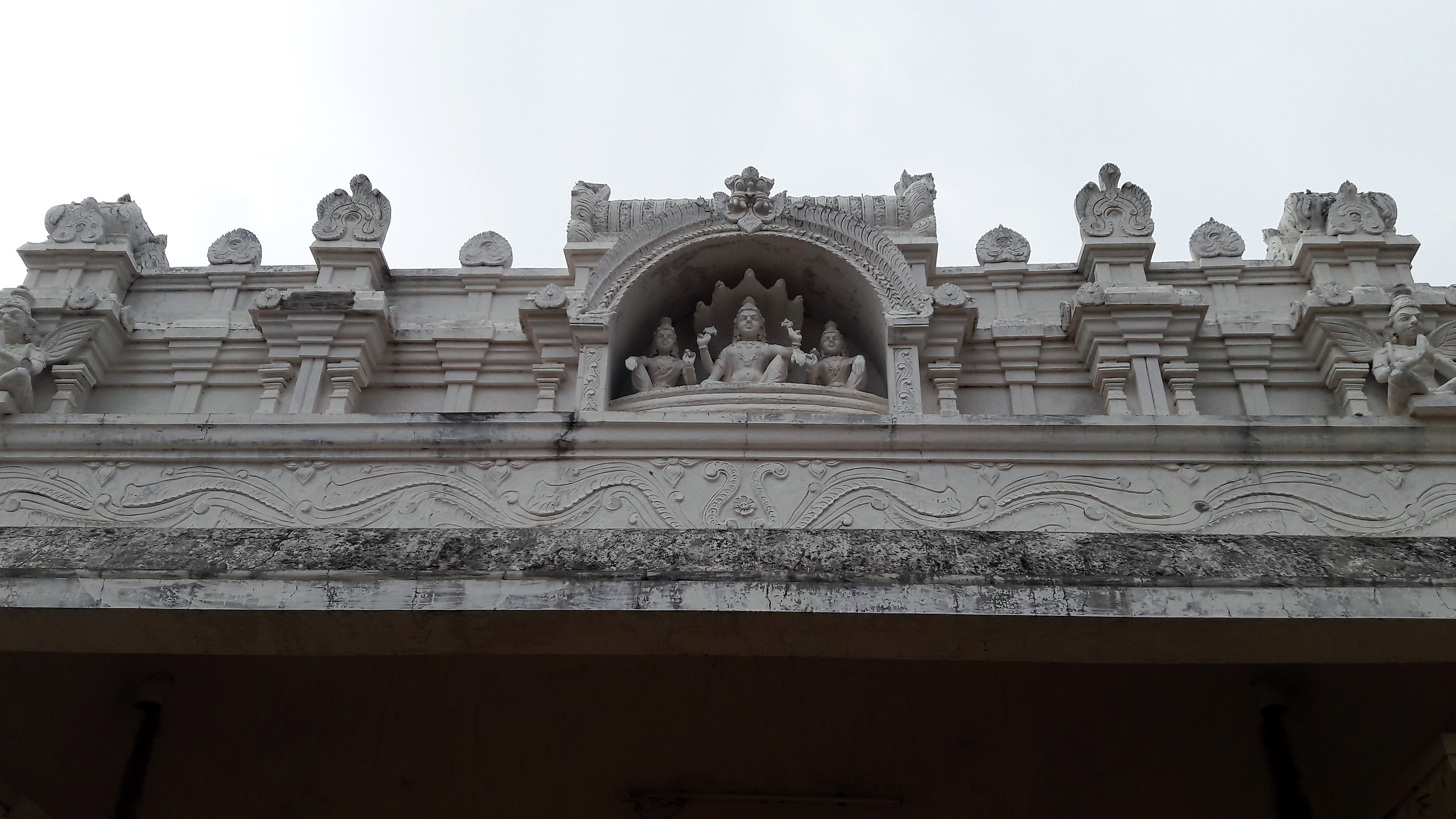
Stucco image of the temple

The name of the place Gunaseelam derives from "Gunam" (meaning cure) and "Seelam" (meaning place), meaning the place in which illness is cured. "Gunam" also means qualities and "seelam" also means "Assuming a lower position". Hence Gunaseelam is the place where Vishnu comes down and addresses the devotees problems from his heavenly position.

== Legend ==
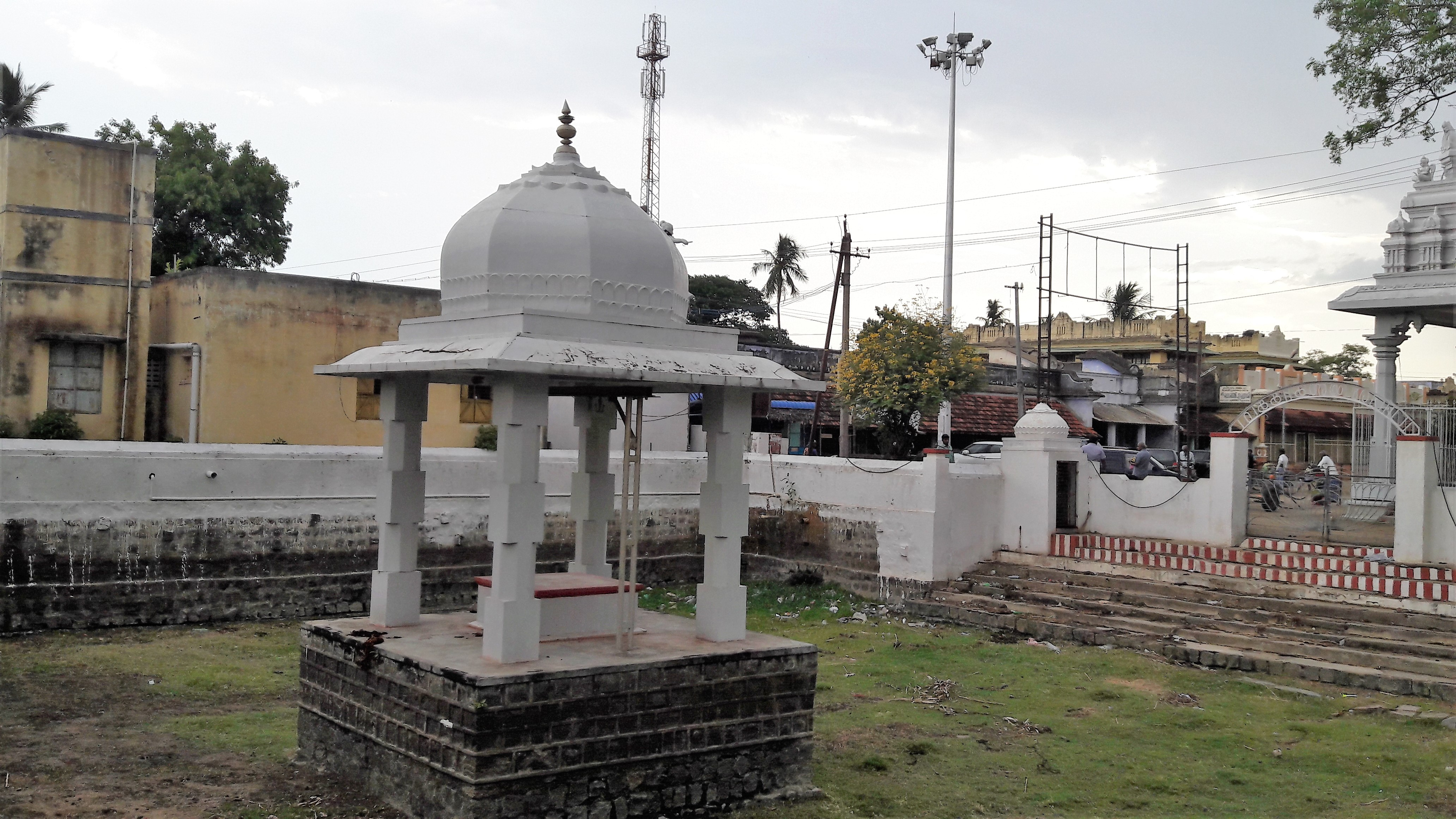
Temple tank

In Bhavishyotra Puranam, one finds reference to the significance of this temple in Gunaseela Mahaatmiyam. Thaalpiya Maharishi along with his disciple Gunaseela Rishi once went to the Himalayas. On his way back, Gunaseela Rishi stayed back at Tirupathi and was so attracted to Lord Venkatachalapathy that he wanted the Lord to appear in Gunaseelam and bless the devotees. He came back, bathed in the Cauvery and undertook severe penance here in his ashram in Gunaseelam. Impressed with his sincerity, the Lord appeared before him along with Goddess and promised to remain here till the end of Kali Yuga. Pleased with the darshan of Prasanna Venkatachalapathy, Gunaseela Maharishi continued to offer his daily poojas to the lord from his ashram here. At the end of the Dvapara Yuga, the Gunaseela Maharishi's Guru wanted him to go to Naimisaaranyam. Gunaseela Rishi designated his young disciple to continue the daily poojas. However, floods in the Cauvery and dangerous animals in the forest led the disciple to leave and thus the poojas came to an abrupt end. The Lord decided to submerge himself in a pit. After several years, the Chola king Nyana Varma, who ruled this place with Uraiyur as the capital, used to visit Gunaseelam regularly. Every day, cowherds would milk the cows from near the pit and carry the milk all the way back to his court.

One day, to everyone's shock, the milk that was filled to the brim of the pot vanished all of a sudden. An invisible voice wanted the king to dissolve the pit by pouring milk. The king brought in his army and used thousands of litres of milk to complete this exercise. Once dissolved, Vaikunta Vasudevan is said to have appeared before the king as Prasanna Venkatesan. As per the king's wishes, the Lord agreed to remain here till the end of Kali Yuga and help fulfill all the prayers of the devotees, who visit this temple. Delighted at the darshan of Prasanna Venkatachalapathy, the king shifted from Uraiyur to Kallur, (this place was then called ‘Badra Chakra Pattinam’) near Gunaseelam and built the beautiful Gunaseelam temple and laid down the process of the daily poojas as directed by Prasanna Venkatesan. He also allocated a lot of land for the temple as well as funds to undertake the daily pooja formalities.

== Architecture ==
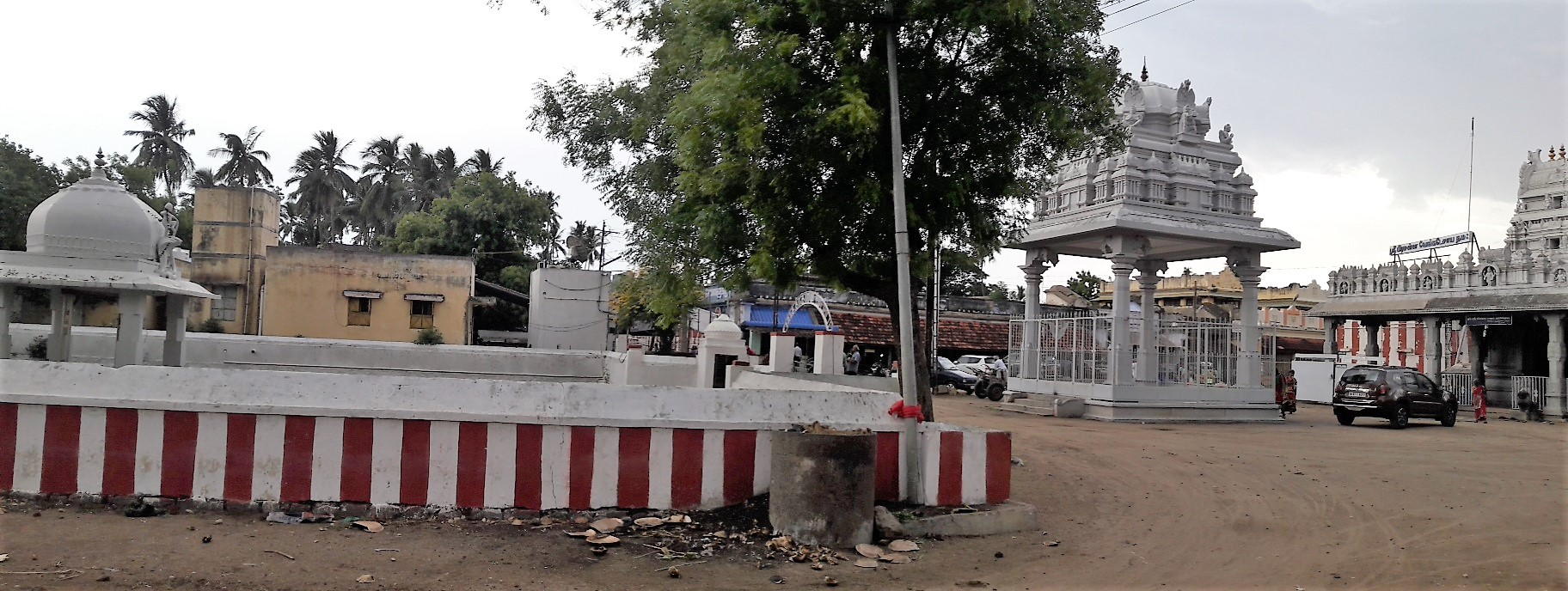
Stucco image of the temple

The temple bears absolutely no resemblance to what it was a quarter of a century ago. With devotees’ contribution, the hereditary trustees have transformed the temple to reflect modern day architecture. New paintings and photographs adorn the temple, with modern flooring. There is written documentation that the temple should be renovated in the 5000th year of Kali Yuga. The renovation was accordingly done. The temple has a shrine for Viganasar, the founder of Vaikanasa Aagamam. Legend says he was given Brahminhood by Venkateshwara himself alongside Brahma, the god of creation.

This temple was designed and built by R. Ranganathan Sthapathy. The central shrine of the temple houses the presiding deity Prasanna Venkatachalapathy in a standing posture. The image is depicted with four hands - one showing Abhaya mudra, one carrying the weapon Gatha, one carrying conch and other carrying the Chakra. There are niches around the sanctum with the images of Narasimha, Navaneetha Krishna, Varaha, Sridevi and Bhudevi. The conical vimana above the central shrine is called Trinetra vimana as it has three tiers. There are stucco sculptures on the vimana depicting Narasimha on eagle vahana Garuda and an image of Vishnu with Shanka and Chakra. The temple has a shrine of Vikhasana Maharishi, after whom the Vaiganasa Agama of Vaishnavism is followed. There are delicate glasswork in the Palliari around the sanctum.

== Mental Health Rehabilitation Centre ==
In addition to the complete reconstruction of the Gunaseelam temple, the trustees have also set up a mental health rehabilitation centre that has the official stamp of the Tamil Nadu Government license. The centre is equipped with individual rooms and toilet facilities. A psychiatrist visits the centre once every week. There are volunteers who take care of these mentally challenged people on a daily basis. Sacred water is splashed on these mentally challenged people each day during Uchi Kaalam (noon) and Artha Jaamam (night) for 48 days. Belief is that one will get cured if they sincerely offer their prayers to the Lord and follow this process. It is today a blend of faith and modern treatment.

== Worship and festivals ==
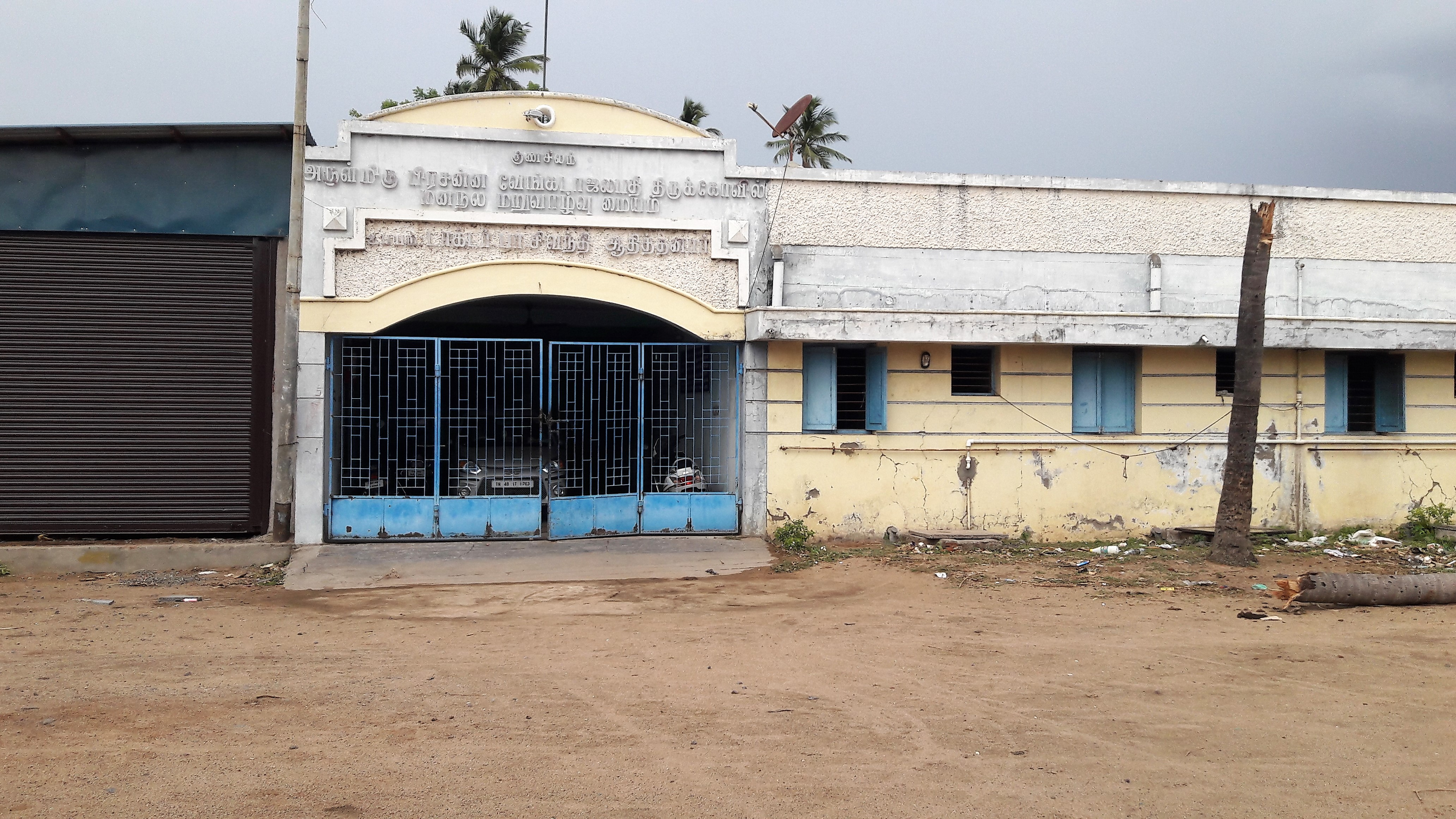
Mental rehabilitation centre

The temple rituals are performed six times a day; Ushathkalam at 6:30 a.m., Kalasanthi at 8:30 a.m., Uchikalam at 12:30 p.m., Thirumalvadai at 5:30 p.m., Sayarakshai at 6:00 p.m. and Ardha Jamam at 8:30 p.m. Each ritual comprises four steps: abhisheka (sacred bath), alangaram (decoration), naivethanam (food offering) and deepa aradanai. Since Tirupathi Lord himself appeared before Gunaseela Maharishi, it is believed that those who are not able to go to Tirupathi can visit Gunaseelam and all their wishes are said to be fulfilled here. During the Uchikalam and Arthajamam, water is sprinkled on devotees, which is believed to expel evil diseases and mental diseases.

The major festival of the temple, Brahmotsavam, is celebrated in the Tamil month of Puratasi (September - October) for 11 days that includes a nine-day chariot festival. The Chitrai Theppotsavam festival is the float festival celebrated during the Tamil month of Chittirai (March - April). The Pavitrotsavam is a three-day festival celebrated during the Tamil month of Aavani. Unlike other Vishnu temples where thirumanjanam (ablution) is performed one in a week, the temple has thirumanjanam performed daily to the central deity. The temple is maintained by a hereditary executive trustee.
