= Kalyanaramasamy Temple, Mimisal =

Shiva temple in Tamil Nadu, India

Kalyanaramasamy Temple is a Hindu temple dedicated to the deity Shiva and Rama located at Mimisal of Pudukkottai district in Tamil Nadu, India.

== Location ==
This temple is located at Pudukkottai-Arantangi-Avudaiyarkoil road, at a distance of 68 km. from Pudukkottai in East Coast Road.From Arantangi buses are plying to this place.

== Presiding deity ==
There are two main shrines in this temple. The presiding deity of one shrine is Kalyaramasamy and the goddess is Mangalanayaki. The presiding deity of another shrine is Arjunesvarar and the goddess is Brihatgujalambikai. This temple is connected with Ramayana. As per the request of Rishis, Rama, as Kalyanarama appeared before them. It is said that if a devotee take a holy bath in this temple and worship these deities at the same time, he will get many good deeds. Kalyana Pushkarani is the temple tank.

== Festivals ==
During the Tamil month of Adi, the festival of Adi, and float festival are held in a grand manner. During the month 9th day and 12th day are considered auspicious. On the 9th day car festival is held.

== Worshipping time ==
Pujas are held five times daily at Visvaroopam (7.00 a.m.), Kalasanthi (9.00 a.m.), Uttchikkalam (noon 12.00), Sayaratchai (6.00 p.m.) and Arthajamam (8.00 p.m.). The temple is opened for worship from 6.00 to 12.00 noon and 4.00 to 8.30 p.m.
