= State Highway 79 (Tamil Nadu) =

State highway in Tamil Nadu

State Highway 79

Route information
- Maintained by Highways and Minor Ports Department
- Length: 98.8 km (61.4 mi)

Major junctions
- East end: Malliakarai
- West end: Erode

Location
- Country: India
- State: Tamil Nadu
- Districts: Erode, Namakkal, Salem.
- Primary destinations: Tiruchengode, Rasipuram

Highway system
- Roads in India; Expressways; National; State; Asian; State Highways in Tamil Nadu

State Highway 79 runs in Erode, Namakkal and Salem districts of Tamil Nadu, India. It connects Erode in the west with Malliakarai, Attur taluk in the east.

== Route ==
The highway passes through Pallipalayam, Tiruchengode and Rasipuram extending to a length of 98.8 km.

== Major junctions ==
- State Highway 96 (Tamil Nadu) at Erode
- State Highway 79A at Pallipalayam
- State Highway 94 at Tiruchengode
- National Highway NH-44 (Old NH-7) near Rasipuram
