= State Highway 62 (Tamil Nadu) =

Road in Tamil Nadu, India

State Highway 62

Route information
- Maintained by Highways and Minor Ports Department
- Length: 32.13 km (19.96 mi)

Major junctions
- From: Trichy, Tiruchirappalli district, Tamil Nadu
- To: Thuraiyur, Tiruchirappalli district, Tamil Nadu

Location
- Country: India
- State: Tamil Nadu
- Districts: Trichy

Highway system
- Roads in India; Expressways; National; State; Asian; State Highways in Tamil Nadu

Tamil Nadu State Highway 62 (SH-62) is a State Highway maintained by the Highways Department of Government of Tamil Nadu. It connects Trichy with Thuraiyur in the northern part of Tamil Nadu.

== Route ==
The total length of the SH-62 is 32.13 kilometres (19.96 mi). The route is from Trichy – Thuraiyur.

== See also ==
- Highways of Tamil Nadu
