= State Highway 30 (Tamil Nadu) =

Road in Tamil Nadu, India

State Highway 30

Route information
- Maintained by Highways and Minor Ports Department
- Length: 92.8 km (57.7 mi)

Major junctions
- From: Musiri, Tiruchirappalli district, Tamil Nadu
- To: Attur, Salem district, Tamil Nadu

Location
- Country: India
- State: Tamil Nadu
- Districts: Trichy, Salem

Highway system
- Roads in India; Expressways; National; State; Asian; State Highways in Tamil Nadu

Tamil Nadu State Highway 30 (SH-30) is a State Highway maintained by the Highways Department of the Government of Tamil Nadu. It connects Musiri with Attur in the northwestern part of Tamil Nadu.

== Route ==
The total length of the SH-30 is 92.8 kilometres (57.7 mi). The route is from Musiri – Attur, via Thuraiyur.

== See also ==
- Highways of Tamil Nadu
