= State Highway 115 (Tamil Nadu) =

Road in Tamil Nadu, India

State Highway 115

Route information
- Maintained by Highways and Minor Ports Department
- Length: 105 km (65 mi)

Major junctions
- From: Cheyyur, Tamil Nadu
- To: Polur, Tamil Nadu

Location
- Country: India
- State: Tamil Nadu

Highway system
- Roads in India; Expressways; National; State; Asian; State Highways in Tamil Nadu

Tamil Nadu State Highway 115 (SH-115) connects Cheyyur with Polur. The total length of SH-115 is 105 km.

SH-115 Route: Odiyur (On East Coast Road) - Cheyyur - Melmaruvathur - Vandavasi - Chettupattu - Devikapuram - Polur
