= Valudambattu =

Vazhudhalambattu
- Village
- Location in Tamil Nadu, India Vazhudhalambattu (India)
- Coordinates: 11.644641°N 79.688159°E
- Country: India
- State: Tamil Nadu
- District: Cuddalore

Government
  - Type: Democracy
  - Body: Village Panjayat

Population (2011)
  - Total: 8,900

Languages
  - Official: Tamil
- Time zone: UTC+5:30 (IST)
- PIN: 607301
- Telephone code: 04142
- Vehicle registration: TN-31

Vazhudhalambattu is a large village located in Kurinjipadi of Cuddalore district, Tamil Nadu with total 2157 families residing. The Vazhudhalambattu village has population of 8900 of which 4553 are males while 4347 are females as per Population Census 2011.

In Vazhudhalambattu village population of children with age 0-6 is 940 which makes up 10.56% of total population of village. Average Sex Ratio of Vazhudhalambattu village is 955 which is lower than Tamil Nadu state average of 996. Child Sex Ratio for the Vazhudhalambattu as per census is 954, higher than Tamil Nadu average of 943.

Vazhudhalambattu village has lower literacy rate compared to Tamil Nadu. In 2011, literacy rate of Vazhudhalambattu village was 75.10% compared to 80.09% of Tamil Nadu. In Vazhudhalambattu Male literacy stands at 85.73% while female literacy rate was 63.97%.

As per constitution of India and Panchyati Raaj Act, Vazhudhalambattu village is administrated by Sarpanch (Head of Village) who is elected representative of village.

== Sub Villages of Valudambattu ==
- Aalapakkam
- Kullanchavadi
