= State Highway 58 (Tamil Nadu) =

Road in Tamil Nadu, India

State Highway 58

Route information
- Maintained by Highways and Minor Ports Department
- Length: 107.4 km (66.7 mi)

Major junctions
- From: Sadras
- To: Tiruttani

Location
- Country: India
- State: Tamil Nadu
- Districts: Kanchipuram, Vellore, Tiruvallur

Highway system
- Roads in India; Expressways; National; State; Asian; State Highways in Tamil Nadu

State Highway 58 is a two lane highway in Tamil Nadu, India.This road links Sadras - Thirukazhukundram - Chengalpattu - Kanchipuram - Arakkonam - Tiruthani Road.

In some stretches between Kanchipuram and Arakkonam, great numbers of cormorants were seen on a wetland along this highway in December 2025. Wildlife Institute of India, Dehradun, documented the nest and breeding patterns of these birds.

The 39 km long Kerala State Highway 58 links Vadakkancherry to Pollachi and passes through Elavanchery gram panchayat.
