= Valathi =

Valathi Valathy
- village
- Location in Tamil Nadu, India Valathi (India)
- Coordinates: 12°22′54″N 79°22′49″E
- Country: India
- State: Tamil Nadu
- District: Villupuram

Population (2011)
  - Total: 4,060

Languages
  - Official: Tamil
- Time zone: UTC+5:30 (IST)
- PIN: 604 208
- Telephone code: 04145
- Vehicle registration: TN 16
- Nearest city: Gingee
- Lok Sabha constituency: Arni
- Tamil Nadu Legislative Assembly constituency: Gingee

Valathi, also known as Valathy, is a village in Gingee assembly constituency, Villupuram district, in the state of Tamil Nadu, India. It is nearly 50 km from district capital Villupuram, 40 km from Tiruvannamalai and 15 km from Gingee. It is about 5 km to Melmalayanur Angalamman temple.

== Geography ==
Valathi is surrounded by rocky hills and lakes. Valathi derives is on the main road (SH4) connecting Arcot and Villupuram. It is a fairly big village, which is surrounded by many small villages. The majority of this population are dependent on agriculture and cattle for their income. It is the main junction of melmalayanur route.

== Population ==
As per latest survey the village has about 1,900 houses and a population of approximately 5,000 people, which consists of Tamil Jains, yadhavar or idayar(konar), Christians, Scheduled Caste, Gounder, and Muslims, Naidu, Naikkar. Its main agriculture product is paddy growing.

== Attractions ==
- Shri Adthinathar Digambar Jain Temple also known as Nainar Temple - Devotees, many from northern India visit this temple.

Thanakathamman temple, Kalikambal temple, Mariamman temple, Vinayagar temples (3), Murugan temple,(2), Police Station, Registrar Office, Muslim Mosque, Government Hospital, Post office, Banks (2), Lakes (2), Markets ( Sunday ) Schools (5), Village Administrative Office,

- Valathi Outreach Church Ministries is run by local a church.
  It mainly focuses on public education.
- Devanur Fort,
- Melmalayanur Temple is 6 kilometres (3.7 mi) away.
- Gingee Fort is located 21 kilometres (13 mi) from the village.
- Pallavas temple in 7 km in Siyamangalam and Thirumalpadi
- D.V.Narayana memorial hospital.
  It mainly focus on public health.
- Lord shiva temple at devanur;
- Vijayabharathi nursery garden
