= State Highway 4 (Tamil Nadu) =

Road in Tamil Nadu, India

State Highway 4

Location
- Country: India
- State: Tamil Nadu

Highway system
- Roads in India; Expressways; National; State; Asian; State Highways in Tamil Nadu
| → SH 6 |

State Highway 4 (SH-4) connects Arcot with Villupuram. Total length of SH-4 is 114 km.

== SH-4 Route ==
Arcot -Thimiri -Arani - Chetput - Valathi - Gingee - Muttathur - Villupuram Road.

- Villupuram Road refers to the junction of SH-4 with NH-45 near Villupuram (Katpadi Gate).
- Katpadi Gate refers to crossing of Villupuram-Katpadi rail line on NH-45.
