= State Highway 57 (Tamil Nadu) =

Road in Tamil Nadu, India

State Highway 57

Location
- Country: India
- State: Tamil Nadu

Highway system
- Roads in India; Expressways; National; State; Asian; State Highways in Tamil Nadu

State Highway 57 is a State highway in Tamil Nadu that connects Singaperumal Koil on GST Road with Thiruvallur via Oragadam and Sriperumbudur on NH 4. The road from Singaperumal Koil till sriperumbudur is converted into six lane as automotive corridor. Some parts of this stretch are four-laned (incomplete) but the majority of this stretch is just a single-lane road. Quite a number of buses and trucks travel on this stretch. The road condition between Oragadam and Sriperambadur is comparatively better. Most of this stretch is four-laned. SH-57 would be an ideal gateway to connect to NH-45 from NH-4 and vice versa once the stretch between Sriperambadur and Oragadam is completely 4 laned. The Renault Nissan manufacturing plant is in Oragadam and can be accessed via this road. The plant is closer to Oragadam in the stretch between Oragadam and Singaperumal Koil. SIPCOT of oragadam is situated here.
