= State Highway 6 (Tamil Nadu) =

Road in Tamil Nadu, India

State Highway 6

Location
- Country: India
- State: Tamil Nadu

Highway system
- Roads in India; Expressways; National; State; Asian; State Highways in Tamil Nadu
← SH 4	→ SH 9

Tamil Nadu State Highway 6 (SH-6) connects Kallakurichi with Thiruvannamalai in Tamil Nadu state, India. Its total length is 68 kilometres (42 mi).

SH-6 Kallakurichi- Sankarapuram -Thiruvannamalai
