= State Highway 10 (Tamil Nadu) =

Road in Tamil Nadu, India

State Highway 10

Location
- Country: India
- State: Tamil Nadu

Highway system
- Roads in India; Expressways; National; State; Asian; State Highways in Tamil Nadu
← SH 9	→ SH 15

Tamil Nadu State Highway 10 (SH-10) connects Cuddalore with Chinnasalem. The total length of SH-10 is 102 km.

SH-10 Route: Cuddalore - Kullanchavadi - Kurinjipadi - Vadalur - Neyveli - Vridhachallam - Veppur - Chinnasalem
