= State Highway 68 (Tamil Nadu) =

Road in Tamil Nadu, India

State Highway 68
- Map of State Highway 68 (Tamil Nadu)

Location
- Country: India
- State: Tamil Nadu

Highway system
- Roads in India; Expressways; National; State; Asian; State Highways in Tamil Nadu

State Highway 68 (SH-68) in Tamil Nadu, India connects Cuddalore with Sankarapuram. Total length of SH-68 is 108 km.

SH-68 Route: Cuddalore - Palur - Thiruvadigai - Panruti - Arasur - Thiruvennainallur - Thirukovilur - Kadambur - Sankarapuram

Sankarapuram Road refers to the junction of SH-68 with SH-6 (Kallakurichi - Sankarapuram - Tiruvannamalai State Highway)
