= State Highway 22 (Tamil Nadu) =

Road in Tamil Nadu, India

State Highway 22

Location
- Country: India
- State: Tamil Nadu

Highway system
- Roads in India; Expressways; National; State; Asian; State Highways in Tamil Nadu

State Highway 22 (SH-22) in Tamil Nadu, India connects Kallanai (Grant Anaicut) with Poompuhar. Total length of SH-22 is 98 km.

SH-22 Route: Kallanai - Thirukattupalli - Thuruvaiyaru - Swamimalai - Kumbakonam - Veppathur - Kadirmangalam - Vanathirajapuram - Mayiladuthurai - Poompuhar
