= Melpattampakkam =

Town in Tamil Nadu, India

Melpattambakkam MPM
- Town Panchayat
- Nicknames: Pattambakkam & pattam
- Location within Tamil Nadu
- Coordinates: 11°48′24″N 79°38′22″E
- Country: India
- State: Tamil Nadu
- District: Cuddalore

Area
  - Total: 5.67 km^{2} (2.19 sq mi)

Population (2011)
  - Total: 6,887
  - Density: 1,210/km^{2} (3,150/sq mi)

Languages
  - Official: Tamil
- Time zone: UTC+5:30 (IST)
- Postal code: 607104

Melpattampakkam is a panchayat town in Cuddalore district in the Indian state of Tamil Nadu.

As of the 2011 India census, Melpattampakkam had a population of 6,887 with 3,475 males and 3,412 females. Out of the total population, 9.43 per cent is under six years of age.

== Religion ==
The city has six temples, along with a mosque and a church.

== Schools ==
- Govt. High School.
- Panchayat Union Middle School.
- Panchayat Union Primary School, Nathamedu.
- Panchayat Union Primary School (Boys).
- Girls Christian Higher Secondary School.
- Ananda matriculation school.
- St. Dominic Matriculation High School.

== Transportation ==
=== Road Transport ===
Melpattampakkam has a robust road network. Frequent buses are available to nearby localities such as Nellikuppam, Panruti and Villupuram. State Highway SH-9 connects Cuddalore, Villupuram, Thiruvannamalai and Vellore districts passes through Melpattampakkam.

=== Airports ===
The most neighbouring airport is in Neyveli Airport And Puducherry - Pondicherry Airport - at a distance of 42.2 kilometres. Spicejet operates regular flights connecting Puducherry to Hyderabad.

=== Railways ===
Melpattampakkam has a railway station - station code MBU. It is under the control of the Tiruchirappalli Division of the Southern Railway zone of the Indian Railways. Trains running between,(Mainline Section) Tiruchirappalli, Mayiladuthurai, Cuddalore and Villupuram pass through this station.
