= List of state highways in Tamil Nadu =

Roads in India

State highways in India are stretches with heavy traffic intensity of more than 10,000 passenger car units (PCUs) but less than 30,000 PCUs which connect district headquarters, important towns and the National Highways in the state and neighboring states. The Construction & Maintenance wing of the Highways Department manages construction and maintenance of all the state highways (SH), major district roads (MDR), and other district roads (ODR). The Tamil Nadu State Highways Network has eight circles: Chennai, Villupuram, Madurai, Salem, Tiruchirappalli, Coimbatore, Tiruppur and Tirunelveli.

The state has a total of 286 state highways, 161 state highways urban (SH-U) stretches and 905 major district roads (MDRs), apart from other district roads (ODRs).

== List of state highways ==
This is a list of state highways in Tamil Nadu (as of March 2019).

=== SH1 to SH50 ===
Road number	OSM relation	Name of road	Division	Length (in km)	Remarks
SHN1	OSM	Pollachi Eastern Bypass Road	Pollachi	13.847	KM 0/0 to KM 3/3, KM 3/36 to KM 8/505 and KM 9/645 to KM 15/047
SHN2	OSM	Tiruppur Ring Road	Tiruppur	38.00	
SH 1	OSM	Chennai - Ennore Expressway Road	Tiruvallur	10.40	KM 8/0 to KM 18/4
SH 1A	OSM	Manali Oil Refinary Road	Tiruvallur	5.70	
SH 2	OSM	Inner Ring Road	Chennai City Roads	25.20	
SH 2A	OSM	Inner Ring Road (Southern Sector)	Chennai City Roads	5.00	
SH 3		Chennai - Tiruvallur - Tiruttani - Renigunta Road		82.10	Upgraded as part of NH 716
SH 4	OSM	Arcot - Villupuram Road	Vellore, Cheyyar, Villupuram	110.219	KM 0/0 to KM 77/8, KM 79/181 to KM 110/2 and KM 113/2 to KM 114/6, section between Semmambadi - Chetpet upgraded into NH179D
SH 4A	OSM	Sanipoondi - Kilpennathur - Avalurpet - Chetpet Road	Tiruvannamalai, Villupuram	42.40	
SH 5	OSM	Arcot - Tindivanam Road	Vellore, Cheyyar, Villupuram	94.60	KM 0/0 to KM 81/9 and KM 82/0 to KM 94/4, 0.100 KMs missing between divisions
SH 5A	OSM	Kancheepuram - Thiruvathipuram Road	Cheyyar	17.20	
SH 6	OSM	Kallakurichi - Tiruvannamalai Road	Kallakurichi, Tiruvannamalai	63.60	
SH 6A	OSM	Tiruvannamalai - Thanipadi - Harur Road	Tiruvannamalai, Dharmapuri	75.40	
SH6B	OSM	Thandrampet - Kottakulam Road	Tiruvannamalai	18.20	
SH7	OSM	Villupuram - Mambalapattu - Thirukoilur Road	Villupuram, Kallakurichi	35.10	KM 40/7 to KM 75/8
SH8	OSM	Vikravandi - Kumbakonam - Thanjavur Road	Thanjavur	11.395	KM 121/8 to KM 129/4 (Kumbakkonam), KM 133/8 to KM 136/37 (Sundaraperumal Kovil), KM 148/3 to KM 148/925 (Ayyampettai) and KM 158/6 to KM 159/2 (Thanjavur), rest of the section upgraded to old NH45C
SH9	OSM	Cuddalore - Chittoor Road	Cuddalore, Kallakurichi, Thiruvannamalai, Vellore	126.10	KM 0/0 to KM 38/4, KM 38/2 to KM 84/8, KM 84/7 to KM 114/0, KM 138/8 to KM 143/6 and KM 196/0 to KM 203/0, runs till Andhra Pradesh border
SH9A	OSM	Tiruvannamalai - Thiyagadurgam Road	Tiruvannamalai, Kallakurichi	51.04	
SH10		Cuddalore - Vridhachalam - Chinnasalem Road		111.152	Upgraded as NH532
SH11	OSM	Calicut - Nilambur - Gudalur Road	Udhagai	6.20	KM 103/6 to KM 109/8, runs from Kerala border
SH12	OSM	Calicut - Vythiri - Gudalur Road	Udhagai	38.00	KM 96/4 to KM 134/4, runs from Kerala border
SH13		Coimbatore - Dindigul Road		158.00	Upgraded as NH209
SH14		Coimbatore - Satyamangalam - Hasanur		106.00	Upgraded as NH209
SH15	OSM	Udhagamandalam - Kotagiri - Mettupalayam - Sathy - Gobi - Erode Road	Udhagai, Coimbatore, Gopichettipalayam, Erode	160.426	KM 0/0 to KM 57/6, KM 58/0 to KM 100/8 and KM 101/6 to KM 161/626
SH15A	OSM	Cheyur to Erode-Sathy Road	Tiruppur, Gopichettipalayam	29.60	KM 0/0 to KM 25/2 and KM 25/8 to KM 30/2
SH16		Krishnagiri - Varadhampalli - Kuppam Road		19.00	Upgraded as NH219
SH17	OSM	Malur - Hosur - Adhiyamankottai Road	Krishnagiri, Dharmapuri	91.70	KM 0/0 to KM 4/5 and KM 16/0 to KM 103/2, runs from Karnataka border, Bagalur - Hosur - Adiyamankottai section upgraded as NH648 & NH844
SH17A	OSM	Hosur - Denkanikottai Road	Krishnagiri	25.60	
SH17B	OSM	Hosur - Thally - Denkanikottai Road	Krishnagiri	42.20	
SH17C	OSM	Bagalur - Berigai Road	Krishnagiri	12.00	
SH18		Salem - Harur - Tirupattur - Vaniyambadi Road		125.00	Upgraded as NH179A
SH18A	OSM	Tirupattur – Singarapet Road	Vaniyambadi, Krishnagiri	29.60	
SH19	OSM	Avinashi - Tiruppur - Palladam - Pollachi - Meenkarai - Kochi Road	Tirupur, Pollachi	85.325	KM 13/8 to KM 76/875 and KM 77/35 to KM 99/6, KM 0/0 to KM 13/8 upgraded as NH381, runs till Kerala border
SH19A	OSM	Tiruppur - Vijayamangalam Road	Tiruppur, Erode	25.20	
SH20	OSM	Bhavani Road (Mayapuram - Central Busstand) via Agraharam urban stretch	Erode	8.984	The entire stretch of KM 0/0 to KM 93/984 of Thoppur-Mettur-Bhavani-Erode has been declared as NH544H. While the improvement works are being carried over by NHAI from KM 0/0 to KM 85/0, the section from KM 85/0 to KM 93/984 urban stretch is still maintained by the SH department.
SH20A	OSM	Mettur - Palar Road	Edappadi	29.40	runs till Karnataka border
SH21	OSM	Pollachi - Dharapuram - Karur Road	Pollachi, Dharapuram, Karur	114.27	KM 0/0 to KM 52/6, KM 56/4 to KM 118/07
SH22	OSM	Grand Anaicut - Kaveripattinam Road	Thanjavur, Mayiladuthurai	124.80	KM 0/0 to KM 33/0 and KM 33/4 to KM 125/2
SH23	OSM	Mayiladuthurai - Thiruthuraipoondi Road	Mayiladuthurai, Tiruvarur	68.40	
SH24		Trichy - Chidambaram Road		135.40	Upgraded as NH227
SH25	OSM	Trichy - Namakkal Road	Trichy, Namakkal	77.40	KM 0/0 to KM 77/4 upgraded as NH381B
SH26	OSM	Trichy - Pudukkottai - Aranthangi - Mimisal Road	Trichy, Pudukkottai	70.095	KM 0/0 to KM 1/6, KM 50/735 to KM 84/145 and KM 84/835 to KM 119/920, KM 1/6 to KM 50/735 upgraded as NH210
SH27	OSM	Perambalur - Manamadurai Road	Ariyalur, Thanjavur	16.19	KM 24/37 to KM 29/21 (Ariyalur), KM 64/85 to KM 71/2 (Thanjavur) and KM 72/2 to KM 77/2 (Thanjavur)
SH28		Thirumayam - Karaikkudi - Devakottai - Devipattinam Road		97.70	Upgraded as NH210
SH29	OSM	Thanjavur - Pattukkottai - Aranthangi - Karaikudi - Paramakudi - Sayalkudi Road	Thanjavur, Pudukkottai, Sivagangai, Ramnad	241.024	KM 0/0 to KM 123/771, KM 130/771 to KM 164/356 and KM 164/556 to KM 248/224
SH30	OSM	Musiri - Thuraiyur - Attur Road	Trichy, Salem	91.20	
SH31		Karur - Gudalur - Mysore Road		287.00	Upgraded as NH67 Extension
SH32	OSM	Madurai - Tuticorin Road	Madurai, Tuticorin	19.60	KM 0/0 to KM 11/0 (Madurai), KM 90/8 to KM 92/6 (Ettayapuram) and KM 126/4 to KM 133/2 (Tuticorin), rest of the sections upgraded as NH45B
SH33	OSM	Madurai - Thondi Road	Madurai	19.20	
SH34	OSM	Ramanathapuram - Nainarkoil - Andakudi - Elayankudi - Sivagangai - Melur Road	Ramnad, Sivagangai, Madurai	98.096	KM 0/0 to KM 41/8, KM 43/8 to KM 74/072, KM 76/072 to KM 89/896 and KM 90/8 to KM 103/0
SH34A	OSM	Uppoor - Kottaiyur Road	Ramnad, Sivagangai	36.80	
SH35	OSM	Dindigul - Natham - Singampunari - Thiruppathur - Karaikudi Road	Madurai, Sivagangai	50.40	KM 45/6 to KM 51/6, KM 53/0 to KM 81/8, KM 82/2 to KM 97/2 and KM 101/8 to KM 102/4, KM 0/0 to KM 102/4 upgraded as NH383
SH36		Dindigul - Vathalagundu - Periyakulam - Theni - Cumbum - Kumuli Road		133.50	Upgraded as NH45 Extension
SH37	OSM	Mettur - Oddanchatram - Dharapuram - Tirupur Road	Dindigul, Palani, Dharapuram, Tirupur	103.00	KM 0/0 to KM 32/0 and KM 37/4 to KM 108/4, KM 108/4 to KM 126/2 upgraded as NH381
SH38	OSM	Aruppukottai - Perunali - Sayalkudi - Kadugusandai - Mariyur - Valinokkam Road	Virudhunagar, Ramnad	73.46	KM 0/0 to KM 52/4 and KM 58/2 to KM 79/26, KM 52/4 to KM 58/2 upgraded as NH32
SH39	OSM	Tirunelveli - Shencottai - Kollam Road	Tirunelveli, Tenkasi	56.135	KM 0/0 to KM 2/0 and KM 2/865 to KM 57/0
SH39A	OSM	Shencottai - Surandai - Pavoorchatram Road	Tenkasi	31.20	
SH39B	OSM	Athiyuthu - Surandai - Sendamaram Road	Tenkasi	22.87	
SH40	OSM	Tiruchendur - Palayamkottai - Ambasamudram - Tenkasi - Courtalam - Shencottai Road	Tuticorin, Tirunelveli, Tenkasi	134.20	
SH40A	OSM	Kadayam - Mukkudal Road	Tirunelveli	28.00	
SH40B	OSM	Ambasamudram - Alangulam Road	Tirunelveli	20.40	
SH41	OSM	Rajapalayam - Sankarankovil - Tirunelveli Road	Virudhunagar, Tenkasi, Tirunelveli	85.73	
SH41A	OSM	Tirunelveli - Pottalpudur Road	Tirunelveli	36.60	begins at the end of an ODR
SH42	OSM	Srivilliputhur - Sivakasi - Virudhunagar - Aruppukottai - Narikudi - Parthibanur Road	Virudhunagar, Ramanad	109.26	
SH43	OSM	Tenkasi - Panpozhi - Thirumalaikovil Road	Tenkasi	14.00	
SH44	OSM	Paruvakudi - Kovilpatti - Ettayapuram - Vilathikulam - Vembar Road	Tenkasi, Tuticorin	91.80	
SH45	OSM	Aralvaimozhi - Nedumangadu Road	Nagercoil	48.90	runs till Kerala border
SH46	OSM	Aralvaimozhi - Nagercoil - Rajakkamangalam - Colachel Road	Nagercoil	9.40	KM 18/8 to KM 28/2, runs between Nagercoil and Rajakkamangalam.
SH47	OSM	Parthibanur - Kamuthi - Aruppukottai Road	Ramnad	41.65	
SH48	OSM	Marmalong Bridge - Irumbuliyur - Vandalur - Mudichur - Oragadam - Walajabad Road	Chennai City Roads, Chengalpattu	49.60	KM 5/0 to KM 21/2 and KM 30/4 to KM 63/8
SH48A	OSM	Mount - Medavakkam Road	Chennai City Roads	9.10	
SH48B	OSM	Taramani Link Road	Chennai City Roads	3.63	
SH48C	OSM	Velachery Bypass Road	Chennai City Roads	1.90	
SH49	OSM	East Coast Road (Thiruvanmiyur - Mahabalipuram - Marakkanam - Pondicherry Road)	Chennai City Roads, Chengalpattu, Villupuram	134.20	KM 11/8 to KM 112/0 and KM 100/8 to KM 134/8. KM 57/0 to KM 68/8 to KM 11/0 and KM 100/8 to KM 134/8 upgraded as NH332A
SH49A	OSM	Rajiv Gandhi Road (Chennai - Thiruporur - Mahabalipuram Road)	Chennai City Roads, Chengalpattu	43.70	KM 13/3 to KM 55/6 and KM 57/0 to KM 58/4
SH49B	OSM	Medavakkam - Sholinganallur - Kudimiyandi Thoppu Road	Chennai City Roads	6.70	
SH49B	OSM	Thirukalukundram - Mamallapuram Road	Chengalpattu	13.20	
SH50	OSM	Thirumazhisai - Thiruvallur - Uthukottai Road	Tiruvallur	46.00	
SH50A	OSM	Korattur – Thinnanur – Periyapalayam Road	Tiruvallur	28.73	
SH50B	OSM	Thandalam - Perambakkam - Thakkolam - Arugilpadi Road	Chengalpattu, Tiruvallur, Vellore	39.40	

=== SH51 to SH100 ===
Road number	OSM relation	Name of road	Division	Length (in km)	Remarks
SH51	OSM	Korathalaiyar Bridge - Puthur Road	Tiruvallur	32.29	runs till Andhra Pradesh border, upgraded as NH716A
SH52	OSM	Kavarapettai – Sathiyavedu Road	Tiruvallur	20.082	runs till Andhra Pradesh border
SH53	OSM	Nagari – Pallipattu Road	Tiruvallur	12.40	runs between Andhra Pradesh borders
SH54	OSM	Chittoor - Tiruttani Road	Vellore, Tiruvallur	48.935	begins from Andhra Pradesh border
SH55	OSM	Mount - Poonamallee - Avadi Road	Tiruvallur	20.20	KM 0/0 to KM 10/8 and KM 11/4 to KM 20/8
SH56	OSM	Thiruvottriyur – Ponneri – Panchetty Road	Tiruvallur	27.80	
SH57	OSM	Singaperumalkoil - Sriperumbudur - Thiruvallur - Red Hills Road	Chengalpattu, Tiruvallur	76.00	KM 0/0 to 24/6, KM 25/925 to KM 40/325 and KM 40/4 to KM 77/4
SH58	OSM	Sadras - Chengalpattu - Kanchipuram - Arakkonam - Tiruthani Road	Chengalpattu, Vellore, Tiruvallur	105.85	KM 0/0 to KM 27/2, KM 28/8 to KM 107/45, Chengalpattu - Kanchipuram section upgraded into NH132B
SH58A	OSM	Kancheepuram - Surappan Road	Chengalpattu	5.40	KM 66/8 to KM 72/2
SH59	OSM	Tiruvalam - Katpadi - Venkatagirikottah Road	Vellore	13.40	KM0/0 to KM 13/4, KM 13/4 to KM 69/0 upgraded as NH234
SH60	OSM	Hogenakkal – Pennagaram – Dharmapuri – Tirupattur Road	Dharmapuri, Krishnagiri, Vaniyambadi	108.20	KM 0/0 to KM 90/8 and KM 90/75 to KM 108/2
SH60A	OSM	Dharmapuri - Morappur - Harur Road	Dharmapuri	37.60	
SH61	OSM	Walajah - Sholinghur - Arakkonam Road	Vellore	51.10	
SH61A	OSM	Ranipet - Sholinghur Road	Vellore	10.60	
SH62	OSM	Trichy - Thuraiyur Road	Trichy	32.125	
SH63	OSM	Thanjavur - Mannargudi - Thiruthuraipoondi - Vedaranyam - Kodiyakkarai Road	Thanjavur, Thiruvarur, Nagapattinam	106.80	
SH64	OSM	Kumbakonam - Sirkali Road	Thanjavur, Mayiladuthurai	53.35	upgraded as NH136B
SH65	OSM	Tiruvarur - Kodavasal - Kumbakonam Road	Tiruvarur, Thanjavur	37.20	
SH66	OSM	Kumbakonam - Mannargudi - Adhirampattinam Road	Thanjavur, Thiruvarur	75.20	
SH67	OSM	Nagore - Nannilam - Nachiyarkoil Road	Nagapattinam, Tiruvarur, Thanjavur	46.95	
SH68	OSM	Cuddalore - Thirukoilur - Sankarapuram Road	Cuddalore, Kallakurichi	94.909	KM 0/0 to KM 23/188, KM 25/381 to KM 64/597 and KM 69/547 to KM 102/052
SH69	OSM	Virudhachalam - Ulundurpet - Villupuram Road	Cuddalore, Kallakurichi, Villupuram	59.60	KM 0/0 to KM 50/4 and KM 50/6 to KM 59/8
SH70	OSM	Virudhachalam - Portonovo Road	Cuddalore	42.60	KM 0/0 to KM 36/8 and KM 45/0 to KM 50/8
SH71	OSM	Musiri - Kulithalai - Pudukkottai - Alangudy - Paeravorani - Sethubavachathiram Road	Trichy, Karur, Pudukkottai, Thanjavur	150.69	KM 0/0 to KM 39/05, KM 40/34 to KM 55/8, KM 55/85 to KM 97/59 and KM 101/96 to KM 156/4.
SH71A	OSM	Manapparai - Thuvarankurichy Road	Trichy	28.00	
SH72	OSM	Madurai - Natham Road	Madurai	20.20	KM 0/0 to KM 20/20, KM 0/0 to KM 20/20 and KM 20/0 to KM 38/485 upgraded as NH785
SH72A	OSM	Madurai - Alagarkoil - Melur Road	Madurai	33.335	
SH72B	OSM	Avaniapuram Bypass Road	Madurai	2.40	
SH73	OSM	Thirumangalam - Pallapatti - Silukkuvarpatti Road	Madurai, Dindigul	42.13	
SH73A	OSM	Thirumangalam - Usilampatti Road	Madurai	26.00	
SH73A	OSM	Madurai - Melakkal - Samayanallur Road	Madurai	18.59	
SH74	OSM	Dindigul - Gujiliamparai - Karur Road	Dindigul, Palani, Karur	70.25	
SH75	OSM	Palayamkottai - Ottapidaram - Vilathikulam - Pandalkudi - Aruppukkottai Road	Tirunelveli, Tuticorin, Virudhunagar	108.58	KM 0/0 to KM 63/6 and KM 64/4 to KM 109/38
SH75A	OSM	Tirunelveli Bypass Road	Tirunelveli	7.60	
SH76	OSM	Puliangudi - Sankarankovil - Kalugumalai - Nalatinpudur Road	Tenkasi, Tuticorin	49.815	
SH77		Kovilpatti - Ottapidaram - Puducottai - Eral - Mukkani Road		76.85	Downgraded as MDR1047
SH78	OSM	Pollachi - Valparai Road	Pollachi	64.00	
SH78A	OSM	Pollachi - Palakkad Road	Pollachi	15.80	runs till Kerala border
SH79	OSM	Mallikkarai - Rasipuram - Thiruchengode - Erode Road	Salem, Namakkal, Erode	98.86	
SH79A	OSM	Sankari - Pallipalayam Road	Edappadi, Namakkal	15.70	Upgraded as a part of NH381A
SH80	OSM	Avinashi - Mettupalayam Road	Tirupur, Coimbatore	38.20	
SH81	OSM	Gobi - Uthukuli - Padiyur Road	Gopichettipalayam, Tirupur	46.60	
SH82	OSM	Sathy - Athani - Bhavani Road	Gopichettipalayam, Erode	52.80	
SH83	OSM	Palani - Dharapuram Road	Palani, Dharapuram	30.89	
SH83A	OSM	Erode - Dharapuram Road	Erode, Tiruppur, Dharapuram	77.80	KM 0/0 to KM 74/65 and KM 77/05 to KM 80/20
SH84	OSM	Erode - Karur Road	Erode, Karur	61.192	a small section near Erode is upgraded as NH381A
SH84A	OSM	Erode - Muthur - Vellakovil - Mulanur Road	Erode, Dharapuram	61.60	Erode - Vellakovil section upgraded as NH381A
SH85	OSM	Rayakottai - Athipalli Road	Krishnagiri	39.80	runs till Karnataka border
SH86	OSM	Omalur - Sankari - Thiruchengodu - Paramathi Road	Edappadi, Namakkal	81.00	
SH86A	OSM	Thiruchengode - Ariyanur Road	Namakkal, Salem	32.80	
SH87	OSM	Udumalpet - Palladam Road	Dharapuram, Tiruppur	45.20	
SH88	OSM	Chittoor - Gudiyattam Road	Vaniyambadi	20.20	begins from Andhra Pradesh border
SH89	OSM	Nanguneri - Tisayanvilai - Bharathar Uvari Road	Tirunelveli	36.034	
SH90	OSM	Marthandam - Pechiparai Road	Nagercoil	20.70	
SH91	OSM	Paraseri - Eraniel- Monday Market - Puthukadai Road	Nagercoil	24.30	KM 0/0 to KM 15/8 and KM 17/2 to KM 25/7
SH92	OSM	Nanguneri - Eruvadi - Valliyoor - Vijayapathy Road	Tirunelveli	41.66	
SH93	OSM	Alwarthirunagari - Nazerath - Sathankulam - Ittamozhi - Valliyoor Road	Tuticorin, Tirunelveli	60.24	Proposed National Highway for Valliyur -Sathankulam -Tiruchendur
SH94	OSM	Tiruchengode - Namakkal Road	Namakkal	30.88	
SH95	OSM	Mohanur - Namakkal - Sendamangalam - Rasipuram Road	Namakkal	53.515	KM 0/0 to KM 18/8 and KM 19/285 to KM 54/0
SH96	OSM	Erode - Perunthurai - Kangayam Road	Erode, Tiruppur	51.233	KM 0/0 to KM 18/837 and KM 19/164 to KM 51/56
SH97	OSM	Udumalpet - Dharapuram Road	Dharapuram	36.348	
SH98	OSM	Gudalur - Sulthan Bathery Road	Udhagai	27.40	
SH99	OSM	Thirukattupalli - Sengipatti - Pattukottai Road	Thanjavur, Pudukkottai	69.519	KM 0/0 to KM 15/55, KM 17/2 to KM 35/2, KM 35/4 to KM 51/2 and KM 51/231 to KM 71/4.
SH99A	OSM	Thanjavur - Vallam Road	Thanjavur	10.60	
SH100	OSM	Uthamapalayam - Bodinaickanur Road	Theni	31.80	

=== SH 101 to SH 150 ===
Road number	OSM relation	Name of road	Division	Length (in km)	Remarks
SH101	OSM	Devathanapatti - Varusanadu Road	Theni	58.00	
SH102	OSM	Uthamapalayam - surulipatty Road	Theni	20.00	
SH103		Tiruvanmiyur - Muttukadu Road		19.20	Merged into SH49
SH104	OSM	Chennai – Pulicut Road	Tiruvallur	26.20	
SH105		Kanakammachattiram - Thakkolam Road		18.45	Downgraded as MDR1049
SH106	OSM	Thiruttani - Podatturpet - Pallipet Road	Tiruvallur	27.082	
SH107		Minjur – Kattur – Thirupalaivanam Road		17.20	Downgraded as MDR1041
SH108	OSM	R.K.Pettai – Pallipattu Road	Tiruvallur	19.60	
SH109	OSM	Pallavaram - Thoraipakkam Road	Chennai City Roads	10.62	
SH110	OSM	Tambaram - Mudichur - Sriperumbudur Road	Chennai City Roads, Chengalpattu	23.50	KM 0/0 to KM 7/5 runs through Mudichur, KM 7/5 to KM 23/5 section begins from KM 4/10 of the previous section
SH110A	OSM	Medavakkam - Mambakkam - Sembakkam Road	Chennai City Roads, Chengalpattu	26.80	
SH111	OSM	Madhavaram - Red Hills Road	Tiruvallur	9.60	
SH112	OSM	Thirumangalam – Mogappair Road	Tiruvallur	2.325	
SH113	OSM	Kodambakkam – Sriperumbudur Road	Tiruvallur, Chengalpattu	28.80	
SH113A	OSM	Poonamallee - Kundrathur - Pallavaram Road	Chennai City Roads, Tiruvallur, Chengalpattu	12.00	
SH114	OSM	Chennai - Ennore Road	Tiruvallur	10.40	KM 8/0 to KM 18/4
SH115	OSM	Cheyyur - Vandavasi - Polur Road	Chengalpattu, Cheyyar, Thiruvannamalai	105.00	
SH116	OSM	Kancheepuram - Vandavasi Road	Chengalpattu, Cheyyar	39.80	
SH116A	OSM	Pudupadi - Iluppai - Vadailuppai - Vishar - Kanchipuram Road	Vellore, Cheyyar, Chengalpattu	37.60	road terminates away from SH116
SH117	OSM	Maduranthagam - Vennangupattu Road	Chengalpattu	37.60	
SH118	OSM	Bukkathurai - Uthiramerur Road	Chengalpattu	31.80	
SH118A	OSM	Uthiramerur - Kancheepuram Road	Chengalpattu	26.40	
SH119		Km.11/8 of SCKAT Road - Vitalapuram - Pudupattinam Road		17.40	KM 0/0 to KM 17/0 and KM 18/4 - KM 18/8, downgraded as MDR1042
SH120	OSM	Walajabad - Sunguvarchathiram - Keelachery Road	Chengalpattu, Tiruvallur	27.60	KM 0/0 to KM 18/4 and KM 21/7 to KM 30/9, chainage difference between divisions
SH121	OSM	Vandalur - Mambakkam - Kelambakkam Road	Chengalpattu	18.60	
SH122	OSM	Abdullapuram - Asanampattu - Alangayam - Thirupathur Road	Vellore, Vaniyambadi	79.50	
SH123	OSM	Kalavai - Vazhapandal Road	Vellore	21.20	runs till Ranipet district border
SH124	OSM	Ponnai - Thiruvalam Road	Vellore	16.40	
SH124A	OSM	Ranipet - Ponnai Road	Vellore	21.60	
SH125	OSM	Panamadangi - Poosarivalasai - Paradharami Road	Vellore, Vaniyambadi	19.60	
SH126	OSM	Arakkonam - Ocheri Road	Vellore	32.00	
SH127	OSM	Pallikonda - Palamaneri Road	Vaniyambadi, Vellore	28.80	Runs till Andhra Pradesh border
SH128	OSM	Sholinghur - Kaveripakkam Road	Vellore	30.00	Runs till Ranipet District border
SH129	OSM	Arcot - Kannamangalam Road	Vellore	25.40	
SH130	OSM	Gudiyatham - Gadambur - Kailasagiri - Vaniyambadi Road	Vaniyambadi	42.00	from KM 42/0 it is unclassified
SH130A	OSM	Ambur - Sathgur Road	Vaniyambadi	19.80	
SH131	OSM	Bargur - Tirupattur Road	Krishnagiri, Vaniyambadi	24.20	
SH132	OSM	Kannamangalam - Arni Road	Cheyyar	17.20	
SH133	OSM	Polur - Chengam Road	Tiruvannamalai	47.00	
SH133A	OSM	Tiruvannamalai - Avalurpet Road	Tiruvannamalai	22.80	
SH134	OSM	Tindivanam - Marakkanam Road	Villupuram	34.00	
SH135	OSM	Villupuram - Tiruvannamalai Road	Tiruvannamalai	2.00	KM 52/4 to KM 54/4
SH136	OSM	Vellemedupettai - Mailam - Pondy Road	Villupuram	48.20	
SH137	OSM	Thirukoilur - Asanur Road	Kallakurichi	39.30	
SH138	OSM	Jail Hill - Vellakarai - Kumalangulam Road	Cuddalore	19.20	
SH139	OSM	Ariyalur - Muthuvancheri - Sripuranthan Road	Ariyalur	35.20	
SH140	OSM	Virudhachalam - Jayankondam - Madhanathur Road	Cuddalore, Ariyalur	48.80	From Thanjavur District cordbr it is MDR
SH141	OSM	Virudhachalam - Tholudur Road	Cuddalore	44.40	
SH142	OSM	Thuraiyur - Perambalur Road	Trichy, Perambalur	39.40	
SH143	OSM	Mathur - Thittakudi Road	Perambalur	26.00	SH till KM 26/0, from Cuddalore District border it is unclassified
SH144	OSM	Kodukkur - Kaduvetti Road	Ariyalur	30.20	
SH145	OSM	Aranthangi - Kattumavadi Road	Pudukkottai	25.80	
SH146	OSM	Mannargudi - Pattukkottai - Sethubhavachatram Road	Tiruvarur, Thanjavur	51.40	
SH147	OSM	Kumbakonam - Karaikal Road	Thanjavur, Mayiladuthurai, Tiruvarur	42.20	runs till Puducherry border
SH148	OSM	Nagore - Vettar Road	Nagapattinam, Tiruvarur	23.00	
SH149	OSM	Sembanarkoil - Nalladai Road	Mayiladuthurai	11.90	runs till Puducherry border
SH150	OSM	Vaitheeswarankoil - Lower Anaicut Road	Mayiladuthurai, Thanjavur	32.25	

=== SH151 to SH200 ===
Road number	OSM relation	Name of road	Division	Length (in km)	Remarks
SH151		Kilvelur - Katchanam Road		20.40	Downgraded as MDR1043
SH152	OSM	Vadamadurai - Oddanchatram Road	Palani	42.80	
SH153	OSM	Palani - Alangiyam - Dharapuram Road	Palani, Dharapuram	32.68	
SH154	OSM	Vathalakundu - Usilampatti - Peraiyur - Kariyapatti - Thiruchuli - Kamuthi - Sayalkudi Road	Dindigul, Madurai, Virudhunagar, Ramnad	161.508	
SH155	OSM	Ammaianaikanur - Vathalagundu Road	Dindigul	18.00	
SH156	OSM	Kodai Ghat Road	Dindigul	56.80	
SH157	OSM	Attur - Perambalur Road	Perambalur	3.40	KM 49/6 to KM 53/0, KM 0/0 to KM 49/6 upgraded as NH136
SH158	OSM	Mettur Thermal Power Plant	Edappadi	5.40	
SH159	OSM	Pallapatti - Suramangalam Road	Salem	2.20	
SH160		Ayothiyapattinam - Belur - Kilakkadu Road		54.60	Downgraded as MDR1044
SH161	OSM	Namakkal - Kannanur Road	Namakkal, Trichy	45.428	
SH162	OSM	North Coimbatore - Ramanathapuram - Chettipalayam Road	Coimbatore	18.91	
SH163	OSM	Palladam - Kochi Road	Tiruppur, Pollachi	54.40	
SH164	OSM	Coimbatore - Anaikatti Road	Coimbatore	29.00	runs till Kerala border
SH165	OSM	Kamanaikenpalayam - Annur Road	Tiruppur, Coimbatore	38.62	
SH166	OSM	Palladam - Avinashi - Puliyampatti Road	Tiruppur, Gopichettipalayam	44.30	
SH167	OSM	North Coimbatore - Maruthamalai Road	Coimbatore	11.18	
SH168	OSM	Karamadai - Kariyampalayam Road	Coimbatore	15.20	
SH169	OSM	Tiruppur - Somanur Road	Tiruppur	19.00	
SH170	OSM	Neelipalayam - Sirumugai Road	Coimbatore	17.80	
SH171	OSM	Kovilvazhi - Karapalayam Road	Tiruppur	17.40	
SH172	OSM	Tiruppur - Kangayam Road	Tiruppur	26.40	
SH173	OSM	Erode - Thingalur Road	Erode	26.00	begins from a tertiary road
SH174		Tiruppur - Dharapuram Road		44.80	Merged into SH37
SH174A	OSM	Palladam - Dharapuram Road	Tiruppur, Dharapuram	29.40	
SH175	OSM	Bhavani - Anthiyur - Chellampalayam Road	Erode	18.00	
SH176	OSM	Thoothukudi - Tiruchendur - Kanyakumari Road	Thoothukudi, Tirunelveli	119.71	
SH177	OSM	Cheranmahadevi - Panagudi Road	Tirunelveli	43.40	
SH178	OSM	Ambasamudram - Papanasam - Upper Dam Road	Tirunelveli	23.00	
SH179	OSM	Kanniyakumari - Pazhaya Uchakada Road	Nagercoil	71.522	runs till Kerala border
SH180	OSM	Colachel - Thiruvattar Road	Nagercoil	23.90	
SH181	OSM	Marthandam - Panachamoodu Road	Nagercoil	14.10	runs till Kerala border
SH182	OSM	Watrap - Alagapuri - Virudhunagar Road	Virudhunagar	37.40	
SH182	OSM	Perambalur Bypass Road	Perambalur	3.875	KM 5/2 to KM 9/075
SH183	OSM	Sivakasi - Alangulam Road	Virudhunagar	15.05	
SH184	OSM	Virudhunagar - Krishnapuram Road	Virudhunagar	23.23	
SH185		Viswanatham - Venkatachalapuram Road		16.195	Downgraded as MDR1048
SH186	OSM	Rajapalayam - Vembakottai Road	Virudhunagar	29.60	
SH187	OSM	Sattur - Sivakasi - Kalugumalai Road	Virudhunagar	38.40	SH till Tenkasi district border, from there it is MDR
SH188	OSM	Salem Junction - Yercaud Road	Salem	30.60	
SH189	OSM	Kangayam - Kodumudi Road	Tiruppur, Dharapuram, Erode	36.20	
SH190	OSM	Karumandampalayam - Malayampalayam - Thamaraipalayam - Salaipudur Road	Erode	17.45	
SH191	OSM	Melur - Thiruppathur Road	Madurai, Sivagangai	31.60	KM 0/0 to KM 31/6 upgraded as NH338
SH191A	OSM	Kummangudi - Pillaiyarpatti - Koviloor Road	Sivagangai	13.975	
SH192	OSM	Thalaiyuthu - Kallimandayam - Edayakottai Road	Palani	55.40	
SH193	OSM	Thadikombu - Pallapatti - Aravakurichi Road	Palani, Karur	46.80	
SH194	OSM	Nagercoil - Thuvarankadu Road	Nagercoil	8.90	
SH195	OSM	Madurai - Viradanur - Valayankulam Road	Madurai	22.60	
SH196	OSM	Tiruppur - Perumanallur - Kunnathur - Perunthurai Road	Tiruppur, Erode	40.80	
SH197	OSM	Vellakovil - Akkaraipalayam - Mulanur Road	Sharapuram	24.60	
SH198	OSM	Komarapalayam - Pallipalayam - Jedarpalayam - Pandamangalam - Velur Road	Namakkal	66.50	section of road near Pallipalayam upgraded as NH381A
SH199	OSM	Vaiyampatty - Tharagampatti - Uppidamangalam - Karur Road	Trichy, Karur	53.64	
SH200	OSM	Nagore - Muthupet - Adhirampattinam - Mimisal - Ramanathapuram - Tuticorin Road	Nagapattinam, Tiruvarur, Thanjavur, Pudukkottai, Sivagangai, Ramanad, Tuticorin	320.462	KM 8/0 to KM 115/8, 115/770 to KM 204/37, KM 213/97 to KM 289/17 and KM 289/2 to KM 338/062 (entire SH upgraded as NH32)

=== SH201 to SH234 ===
Road number	OSM relation	Name of road	Division	Length (in km)	Remarks
SH201	OSM	Namanasamudram - Ponnamaravathi Road	Pudukkottai	33.30	KM 9/4 to KM 42/7, from Sivagangai District border it is MDR
SH202	OSM	Tiruvarur - Mannargudi - Muthupet Road	Tiruvarur	60.00	
SH203	OSM	Mundiyampakkam - Pondicherry Road	Villupuram	21.25	
SH204	OSM	Kallakurichi - Koothakudi Road	Kallakurichi	24.80	
SH205	OSM	Vanagaram - Ambathur - Puzhal Road	Tiruvallur	14.60	
SH206	OSM	Poonamallee - Pattabiram Road	Tiruvallur	11.60	
SH207	OSM	Vellore - Ussoor Road	Vellore	8.00	
SH208	OSM	Hosur Inner Ring Road	Krishnagiri	8.85	Section of the road upgraded as NH844
SH209	OSM	Kumbakonam Bypass Road	Thanjavur	6.30	section of the road upgraded to NH136B
SH210	OSM	Sirkali Bypass Road	Mayiladuthurai	1.015	KM 6/6 to KM 7/615 (upgraded as NH 136B)
SH211	OSM	Thirukoilur Bypass Road	Kallakurichi	4.391	KM 0/004 to KM 4/395
SH212		Chidambaram South Bypass		7.28	Upgraded as part of NH45A
SH213	OSM	Virudhachalam Bypass Road	Cuddalore	9.153	
SH214	OSM	Chidambaram Bypass Link Road	Cuddalore	1.904	
SH215	OSM	Polur - Jamunamarathur - Alangayam - Vaniyambadi Road	Thiruvannamalai, Vanuyambadi	81.60	
SH215	OSM	Villupuram - Pondy - Mayiladuthurai - Nagapattinam Road (Old NH45A)	Cuddalore	16.60	KM 96/6 to KM 17/2 and KM 109/6 to KM 115/6
SH216	OSM	Solathiram - Srimushnam Road	Cuddalore	20.00	
SH217	OSM	Ariyalur - Sendurai - Jayankondam Road	Ariyalur	44.00	
SH218	OSM	Salem - Omalur Road	Salem	3.60	road was extended due to new flyover
SH219	OSM	Jagir Ammapalayam - Tharamangalam Road	Salem, Edappadi	18.50	
SH219A	OSM	Tharamangalam - Jalagandapuram Road	Edappadi	10.00	
SH220	OSM	Sankari - Edappadi - Mecheri Road	Edappadi	44.61	
SH220A	OSM	Edappadi - Poolampatty - Mettur Road	Edappadi	25.935	
SH220B	OSM	Edappadi - Nedunkulam - Koneripatti - Anandampalayam Road	Edappadi, Erode	14.77	Koneripatti Barrage across River Kaveri is not included as SH.
SH221	OSM	Magudanchavadi - Edappadi - Komarapalayam Road	Edappadi, Namakkal	44.66	KM 0/0 to KM 42/06 and KM 40/8 to KM 43/4
SH222	OSM	Omalur - Mecheri - Perumpalai - Pennagaram Road	Edappadi, Dharmapuri	58.08	
SH223	OSM	Tharamangalam - Nangavalli - Kunjandiyur Road	Edappadi	19.60	
SH224	OSM	Palacode - Nagadasampatti Road	Dharmapuri	21.00	
SH225	OSM	Krishnagiri - Rayakottai Road	Krishnagiri	30.80	
SH226	OSM	Krishnagiri - Berigai Road	Krishnagiri	40.60	
SH227	OSM	Theni - Venkatachalapuram - Chinnamanur Road	Theni	28.82	
SH228	OSM	Koduvillarpatti - S.Alagapuri - Seelyampatti Road	Theni	23.255	
SH229	OSM	Uthamapalayam - Bodenthirapuram Road	Theni	24.40	
SH230	OSM	Vellore Old Bypass Road	Vellore	1.20	
SH231	OSM	Hill Round Road	Tiruvannamalai	5.20	
SH232	OSM	Valapadi - Belur Road	Salem	6.40	
SH233	OSM	Sitra - Kurumbapalayam Road	Coimbatore	8.61	
SH234	OSM	Tiruchendur - Sathankulam Road	Thoothukudi	24	Proposed National Highway by connecting SH-93(Valliyur to Sathankulam)
SH235	OSM	Tirunelveli - Moolakkaraipatti- Sathankulam - Periyathalai Road	Tirunelveli, Thoothukudi	60	
SH234	OSM	Outer Ring Road	Chengalpattu, Tiruvallur	60.950	KM 0/0 to KM 18/8 and KM 18/0 to KM 60/150.
Total				11006.698	

== List of state highways urban ==
This is a list of the state highways urban stretches in Tamil Nadu (as of March 2019).

=== SHU to SHU50 ===
Number	OSM relation	Name of road	Division	Length in km	Remarks
SHU	OSM	Chennai - Tiruthani - Renigunta Road (Old NH205)	Tiruvallur	18.786	KM 17/894 to KM 18/869 (Lakshmipuram), KM 19/578 to KM 21/193 (Arkot Kuppam), KM 24/09 to KM 25/51 (Kanakammachathram), KM 29/5 to KM 29/93 (Ramanchery), KM 37/392 to KM 38/235 (Pattaraiperumpudur), KM 43/577 to KM 43/85 (Tirupachur), KM 44/3 to KM 50/49, KM 50/94 to KM 51/91, KM 52/35 to KM 55/21 and KM 56/025 to KM 59/235, as of Mar-19 last four sections are part of NH716
SHU	OSM	Arni Bypass Road	Cheyyar	5.314	
SHU	OSM	Thiruvathipuram Bypass Road	Cheyyar	3.00	
SHU	OSM	Mettur High Level Link Bridge	Edappadi	0.70	
SHU	OSM	Dindigul - Vathalagundu - Theni (Old NH45)	Dindigul	5.220	KM 0/0 to KM 5/22 (Vathalagundu)
SHU	OSM	Cochin – Madurai - Dhanushkodi Road (Old NH49)	Ramnad	8.65	KM 0/0 to KM 8/65 (Ramanadhapuram)
SHU3	OSM	Chennai - Chittoor - Bangalore Road (Old NH4)	Tiruvallur, Chengalpattu	10.34	KM 17/9 to KM 22/6 (Poonamallee), KM 39/39 to KM 41/74 (Sriperumbudur), KM 0/0 to KM 1/49 (Baluchetty) and KM 82/6 to KM 84/4 (Thamal)
SHU4	OSM	Varanasi - Kanniyakumari Road (Old NH7)	Karur	1.60	KM 330/0 to KM 331/6 (Aravakurichi)
SHU5	OSM	Bhavani - Komarapalayam Road	Erode	0.60	KM 1/8 to KM 2/4 (section of the road upgraded as NH544H)
SHU6	OSM	Chennai - Trichy - Dindugal Road (Old NH45)	Chengalpattu	7.20	KM 54/4 to KM 61/6 (Chengalpattu)
SHU7	OSM	Chennai - Trichy - Dindugal Road (Old NH45)	Chengalpattu	1.80	KM 80/4 to KM 82/2 (Mathuranthagam)
SHU8	OSM	Chennai - Trichy - Dindugal Road (Old NH45)	Chengalpattu	0.90	KM 91/65 to KM 92/55 (Melmaruvathur)
SHU9	OSM	Chennai - Trichy - Dindigul Road (Old NH45)	Trichy	11.40	KM 311/4 to KM 314/0 (Trichy) and KM 313/2 to KM 322/0 (Trichy)
SHU10	OSM	Chennai - Trichy - Dindugal Road (Old NH45)	Palani, Dindigul	6.355	KM 395/925 to KM 396/435 (Ayyalur), KM 403/4 to KM 405/075 (Vadamadurai) and KM 417/25 to KM 421/42 (Dindigul)
SHU11	OSM	Chinthamani Bypass Road	Trichy	1.40	
SHU13	OSM	Collector Bungalow - Adivaram Road	Salem	0.80	KM 10/2 to KM 11/0
SHU14	OSM	Old Bangalore - Salem - Madurai Road	Dharmapuri	2.40	KM 135/8 to KM 136/4 and KM 136/6 to KM 138/4 (Dharmapuri)
SHU15	OSM	Grand Northern Trunk Road (Old NH5)	Tiruvallur	5.10	KM 16/8 to KM 18/8 (Red Hills) and KM 22/6 to KM 25/7 (Karanodai)
SHU17	OSM	Grand Northern Trunk Road (Old NH5)	Tiruvallur	4.60	KM 42/0 to KM 46/6 (Gummidipoondi)
SHU18	OSM	Hasthampatty - Cherry Road	Salem	2.39	
SHU19	OSM	Varanasi - Kanniyakumari Road (Old NH7)	Krishnagiri	2.20	KM 39/4 to KM 41/6 (Hosur), section of the road upgraded as NH844
SHU20	OSM	Varanasi - Kanniyakumari Road (Old NH7)	Dharmapuri	3.38	KM 114/930 to KM 118/310 (Karimangalam)
SHU21	OSM	Karuppur Branch Road	Edappadi	0.40	approximate road chosen
SHU22	OSM	Salem - Cochin - Kanniyakumari Road (Old NH47)	Namakkal	3.46	KM 0/0 to KM 3/46 (Komarapalayam)
SHU23	OSM	Krishnagiri - Ranipet Road (Old NH46)	Krishnagiri	1.253	KM 0/0 to KM 1/253 (Krishnagiri)
SHU24	OSM	Krishnagiri - Ranipet Road (Old NH46)	Vellore	16.86	KM 115/0 to KM 120/4 (Vellore), KM 130/6 to KM 131/26 (Ratnagiri), KM 133/10 to KM 141/10 (Arcot), KM 142/8 to KM 144/4 (Ranipet) and KM 144/2 to KM 145/4 (Ranipet)
SHU25	OSM	Kochi - Madurai - Dhanushkodi Road (Old NH49)	Sivagangai	1.60	KM 45/6 to KM 47/2 (Manamadurai)
SHU26	OSM	Varanasi - Kanniyakumari Road (Old NH7)	Tuticorin	9.22	KM 88/27 to KM 92/8 (Kovilpatti), KM 92/9 to KM 94/59 (Kovilpatti) and KM 120/0 to KM 123/0 (Kayathar)
SHU27	OSM	Varanasi - Kanniyakumari Road (Old NH7)	Tirunelveli	2.60	KM 181/0 to KM 183/6 (Nanguneri)
SHU28	OSM	Varanasi - Kanniyakumari Road (Old NH7)	Tirunelveli	2.60	KM 203/4 to KM 206/0 (Panagudi)
SHU29	OSM	Varanasi - Kanniyakumari Road (Old NH7)	Tirunelveli	1.135	KM 218/04 to KM 219/175 (Pazhavoor)
SHU30	OSM	Varanasi - Kanniyakumari Road (Old NH7)	Tirunelveli	1.60	KM 187/8 to KM 189/4 (Thalapathisamudram)
SHU31	OSM	Varanasi - Kanniyakumari Road (Old NH7)	Tirunelveli	2.00	KM 130/8 to KM 132/8 (Gangaikondan)
SHU32	OSM	Varanasi - Kanniyakumari Road (Old NH7)	Virudhunagar	2.90	KM 69/7 to KM 72/6 (Sattur)
SHU33	OSM	Varanasi - Kanniyakumari Road (Old NH7)	Virudhunagar	4.173	KM 42/687 to KM 46/86 (Virudhunagar)
SHU36	OSM	Trichy - Madurai - Tuticorin Road (Old NH45B)	Virudhunagar	7.80	KM 43/8 to KM 51/6 (Aruppukottai)
SHU37	OSM	Mettur Branch Road	Edappadi	0.105	
SHU41	OSM	Varanasi - Kanniyakumari Road (Old NH7)	Karur	15.464	KM 281/296 to KM 288/31 (Thottakurichi) and KM 292/8 to KM 301/25 (Karur)
SHU42	OSM	Varanasi - Kanniyakumari Road (Old NH7)	Dindigul	3.475	KM 405/6 to KM 409/075 (Avarampatty)
SHU43	OSM	Grand Southern Trunk Road (Old NH45)	Villupuram	1.36	KM 146/64 to KM 148/0 (Vikravandi)
SHU45	OSM	Old Salem - Cochin Road	Edappadi	1.40	KM 22/6 to KM 24/0 (Magudanchavadi)
SHU45	OSM	Dindigul - Vathalagundu - Theni (Old NH45)	Theni	21.515	KM 0/0 to KM 3/22 (Devathanapatti), KM 0/0 to KM 12/095 (Periyakulam) and KM 0/0 to KM 6/2 (Theni)
SHU46	OSM	Palayamkottai - Tuticorin Port Road (Old NH7A)	Tuticorin	2.175	KM 37/14 to KM 39/315 (Pudukottai)
SHU47	OSM	Pennaiyar Bridge Approach Road	Kallakurichi	1.60	
SHU48	OSM	Periyar Memorial Pillar - Kenikkarai Road	Ramnad	1.20	KM 111/8 to KM 113/0 (Ramanadhapuram)
SHU50	OSM	Salem - Cochin - Kanniyakumari Road (Old NH47)	Nagercoil	0.96	KM 630/0 to KM 630/96 (Parvathipuram)

=== SHU51 to SHU100 ===
Road number	OSM relation	Name of road	Division	Length (in km)	Remarks
SHU51	OSM	Salem - Cochin - Kanniyakumari Road (Old NH47)	Nagercoil	1.97	KM 634/9 to KM 636/87 (Nagercoil)
SHU52	OSM	Salem - Cochin - Kanniyakumari Road (Old NH47)	Coimbatore	28.86	KM 141/6 to KM 157/6 (Coimbatore), KM 161/2 to KM 171/2 (Coimbatore) and KM 173/64 to KM 176/5 (KG Chavadi)
SHU53	OSM	Salem Junction - Salem New Bypass Link Road	Salem	0.40	KM 5/2 to KM 5/6
SHU54	OSM	Salem New Bypass Road	Salem	5.00	
SHU55	OSM	Salem - Ulundurpet Road	Salem	3.65	KM 3/6 to 5/6 (Salem) and KM 50/35 to KM 52/0 (Attur)
SHU56		Dindigul - Natham - Singampunari - Thiruppathur - Karaikudi Road (Old SH35)		0.575	KM 1/725 to KM 2/150 and KM 2/21 to KM 2/36, upgraded as NH383
SHU57	OSM	Varanasi - Kanniyakumari Road (Old NH7)	Krishnagiri	1.10	KM 62/13 to KM 63/23 (Shoolagiri)
SHU59	OSM	Taj Bypass Road	Dharapuram	0.60	
SHU61	OSM	Thanjavur Byepass Road (Phase II)	Thanjavur	14.265	
SHU62	OSM	Kollam - Tenkasi - Thirumangalam Road (Old NH208)	Virudhunagar	0.23	KM 0/0 to KM 0/23 (Alagapuri)
SHU63	OSM	Kollam - Tenkasi - Thirumangalam Road (Old NH208)	Virudhunagar	1.80	KM 80/0 to KM 81/8 (Srivilliputhur)
SHU64	OSM	Trichy - Salem Road	Salem	3.20	
SHU65	OSM	Thoppur - Mettur Road	Edappadi	0.25	
SHU66	OSM	Varanasi - Kanniyakumari Road (Old NH7)	Dharmapuri	1.00	KM 162/8 to KM 163/8 (Thoppur)
SHU70	OSM	Valankulam Bypass Road	Coimbatore	3.20	
SHU71	OSM	Varanasi - Kanniyakumari Road (Old NH7)	Krishnagiri	4.22	KM 89/38 to KM 93/6 (Krishnagiri)
SHU72	OSM	Varanasi - Kanniyakumari Road (Old NH7)	Edappadi	1.09	KM 163/8 to KM 164/89 (Thoppur)
SHU73	OSM	Varanasi - Kanniyakumari Road (Old NH7)	Madurai, Dindigul	15.275	KM 374/5 to KM 380/375 (Dindigul), KM 436/2 to KM 445/6 (Madurai)
SHU74	OSM	Coimbatore - Dindigul Road (Old NH209)	Dindigul	2.365	KM 158/635 to KM 161/0 (Dindigul)
SHU75	OSM	Cochin - Madurai - Dhanushkodi Road (Old NH49)	Ramnad	1.30	KM 58/5 to KM 59/8 (Parthibanur)
SHU77	OSM	Salem - Cochin - Kanniyakumari Road (Old NH47)	Nagercoil	0.80	KM 639/335 to KM 640/135 (Suchindram)
SHU78	OSM	Salem - Cochin Road	Salem	1.60	
SHU80	OSM	Varanasi - Kanniyakumari Road (Old NH7)	Salem	8.14	KM 199/45 to KM 207/59 (Salem)
SHU82	OSM	Old Palar Road	Vellore	2.00	
SHU84	OSM	Varanasi - Kanniyakumari Road (Old NH7)	Namakkal	2.60	KM 270/65 to KM 273/25 (Paramathi)
SHU86	OSM	Grand Western Trunk Road	Chennai City Roads	13.80	
SHU87	OSM	Grand Northern Trunk Road	Chennai City Roads	10.70	KM 0/8 to KM 11/5
SHU88	OSM	Grand Southern Trunk Road	Chennai City Roads	28.00	
SHU89	OSM	Nagapattinam - Gudalur - Mysore Road (Old NH67)	Tiruvarur, Thanjavur, Trichy	19.63	KM 22/43 to KM 24/67 (Tiruvarur), KM 76/775 to KM 78/075 (Punnainallur), KM 80/485 to KM 89/275 (Thanjavur), KM 93/25 to KM 97/25 (Vallam), KM 135/8 to KM 138/0 (Trichy), KM 140/8 to 142/0 (Trichy)
SHU90	OSM	Dindigul - Vathalagundu - Theni (Old NH45)	Dindigul	2.16	KM 0/6 to KM 2/76 (Dindigul)
SHU91	OSM	Chennai - Tiruthani - Renigunta Road	Tiruvallur	5.55	KM 43/8 to KM 47/2 (Tiruvallur, only 2.1 KMs mapped), KM 83/4 to KM 85/2 (Tiruttani) and KM 0/0 to KM 0/35 (Tiruvallur, chainage modified)
SHU92	OSM	Old Tuticorin - Kollam Road	Tuticorin	6.40	KM 0/0 to KM 6/4
SHU93	OSM	Varanasi - Kanniyakumari Road (Old NH7)	Tirunelveli	18.00	KM 142/0 to KM 160/0 (Tirunelveli)
SHU94		Varanasi - Kanniyakumari Road (Old NH7)		5.675	KM 192.445 to KM 198/12, modified as SHU149
SHU95	OSM	Palayamkottai - Tuticorin Port Road (Old NH7A)	Tirunelveli	4.00	KM 0/0 to KM 4/0 (Tirunelveli)
SHU96	OSM	Trichy - Madurai - Tuticorin Road (Old NH45B)	Virudhunagar	5.00	KM 61/2 to KM 66/2 (Pandhalkudi)
SHU97	OSM	Trichy - Madurai - Tuticorin Road (Old NH45B)	Virudhunagar	4.00	KM 27/6 to KM 31/6 (Kariapatti)
SHU98	OSM	Trichy - Madurai - Tuticorin Road (Old NH45B)	Virudhunagar	3.00	KM 36/2 to KM 39/2 (Kalkurichi)
SHU99	OSM	Salem - Cochin - Kanniyakumari Road (Old NH47)	Nagercoil	0.84	KM 603/76 to KM 604/6 (Kuzhithurai)
SHU100	OSM	Varanasi - Kanniyakumari Road (Old NH7)	Madurai	14.05	KM 426/75 to KM 440/8 (Madurai)

=== SHU101 to SHU150 ===
Road number	OSM relation	Name of road	Division	Length (in km)	Remarks
SHU101	OSM	Varanasi - Kanniyakumari Road (Old NH7)	Madurai	9.00	KM 0/0 to KM 9/0 (Madurai)
SHU102	OSM	Varanasi - Kanniyakumari Road (Old NH7)	Madurai	6.50	KM 410/15 to KM 415/65 (Vadipatti)
SHU103	OSM	Trichy - Madurai - Tuticorin Road (Old NH45B)	Madurai	5.00	KM 116/0 to KM 121/0 (Madurai)
SHU104	OSM	Trichy - Madurai - Tuticorin Road (Old NH45B)	Madurai	5.00	KM 96/0 to KM 101/0 (Melur)
SHU105	OSM	Varanasi - Kanniyakumari Road (Old NH7)	Madurai	4.00	KM 15/2 to KM 19/2 (Thirumangalam)
SHU106	OSM	Trichy - Madurai - Tuticorin Road (Old NH45B)	Madurai	3.00	KM 75/15 to KM 78/15 (Kottampatti)
SHU107	OSM	Cochin – Madurai - Dhanushkodi Road (Old NH49)	Madurai	2.40	KM 2/8 to KM 5/2 (Madurai)
SHU108	OSM	Dindigul - Coimbatore - Thimbam - Bangalore Road (Old NH209)	Palani	4.96	KM 52/49 to KM 57/45 (Palani)
SHU109	OSM	Cochin - Madurai - Dhanushkodi Road (Old NH49)	Ramnad	0.20	KM 74/0 to KM 74/2 (Paramakudi)
SHU110	OSM	Salem - Cochin - Kanniyakumari Road (Old NH47)	Gopichettipalayam	4.20	KM 59/8 to KM 64/0 (Chithode)
SHU111	OSM	Salem - Cochin - Kanniyakumari Road (Old NH47)	Erode	7.10	KM 0/0 to KM 7/1 (Perundurai)
SHU112	OSM	Salem - Cochin - Kanniyakumari Road (Old NH47)	Erode	2.40	KM 0/0 to KM 2/4 (Nasiyanur)
SHU113	OSM	Salem - Cochin - Kanniyakumari Road (Old NH47)	Erode	2.20	KM 0/0 to KM 2/2 (Vijayamangalam)
SHU114	OSM	Salem - Cochin Link Road	Erode	0.42	KM 0/0 to KM 0/42 (Vijayamangalam)
SHU115	OSM	Nagapattinam - Gudalur - Mysore Road (Old NH67)	Karur	7.92	KM 208/53 to KM 214/8 (Karur) and KM 217/4 to KM 219/05 (Karur)
SHU116	OSM	Nagapattinam - Gudalur - Mysore Road (Old NH67)	Karur	2.445	KM 183/117 to KM 185/562 (Lalapet)
SHU117	OSM	Salem - Cochin - Kanniyakumari Road (Old NH47)	Edappadi	9.75	KM 31/85 to KM 41/6 (Sankari)
SHU118	OSM	Varanasi - Kanniyakumari Road (Old NH7)	Edappadi	2.25	KM 186/6 to KM 188/85 (Omalur)
SHU119	OSM	Varanasi - Kanniyakumari Road (Old NH7)	Salem	1.48	KM 216/05 to KM 217/53 (Mallur)
SHU120	OSM	Salem - Cochin - Kanniyakumari Road (Old NH47)	Salem	3.39	KM 1/67 to KM 5/06 (Kondalampatti)
SHU121	OSM	Varanasi - Kanniyakumari Road (Old NH7)	Namakkal	10.15	KM 249/05 to KM 259/2 (Namakkal)
SHU122	OSM	Varanasi - Kanniyakumari Road (Old NH7)	Namakkal	3.126	KM 275/294 to KM 278/42 (Velur)
SHU123	OSM	Varanasi - Kanniyakumari Road (Old NH7)	Namakkal	1.29	KM 234/845 to KM 236/135 (Puduchatram)
SHU124	OSM	Varanasi - Kanniyakumari Road (Old NH7)	Namakkal	1.525	KM 242/6 to KM 244/125 (Sellappampatty)
SHU125	OSM	Varanasi - Kanniyakumari Road (Old NH7)	Namakkal	0.50	KM 217/53 to KM 218/03 (Mallur)
SHU126	OSM	Salem - Cochin - Kanniyakumari Road (Old NH47)	Namakkal	1.10	KM 45/6 to KM 46/7 (Pallakkapalayam)
SHU127	OSM	Krishnagiri - Ranipet Road (Old NH46)	Krishnagiri	4.20	KM 13/4 to KM 17/6 (Bargur)
SHU128	OSM	Varanasi - Kanniyakumari Road (Old NH7)	Krishnagiri	4.83	KM 101/15 to KM 105/98 (Kaveripattinam)
SHU129	OSM	Varanasi - Kanniyakumari Road (Old NH7)	Dharmapuri	15.85	KM 132/3 to KM 148/15 (Dharmapuri)
SHU130	OSM	Varanasi - Kanniyakumari Road (Old NH7)	Dharmapuri	1.53	KM 122/0 to KM 123/53 (Periyampatti)
SHU131	OSM	Varanasi - Kanniyakumari Road (Old NH7)	Dharmapuri	1.10	KM 125/4 to KM 126/5 (Matlampatti)
SHU132	OSM	Trichy - Madurai - Tuticorin Road (Old NH45B)	Trichy	4.40	KM 0/0 to KM 4/4 (Trichy)
SHU133	OSM	Trichy - Madurai - Tuticorin Road (Old NH45B)	Trichy	3.20	0/0 to KM 3/2 (Thuvarankurichi)
SHU134	OSM	Chennai - Trichy - Dindigul Road (Old NH45)	Trichy	1.15	KM 306/0 to KM 307/15 (Samayapuram)
SHU135	OSM	Trichy - Madurai - Tuticorin Road (Old NH45B)	Pudukottai	3.563	KM 24/0 to KM 27/563 (Viralimalai)
SHU136	OSM	Villupuram - Pondy - Mayiladuthurai - Nagapattinam Road (Old NH45A)	Nagapattinam	14.667	KM 127/4 to KM 134/2 (Mayiladuthurai) and KM 186/133 to KM 194/0 (Nagapattinam)
SHU137	OSM	Grand Southern Trunk Road (Old NH45)	Villupuram	4.00	KM 121/085 to KM 125/085 (Tindivanam)
SHU138	OSM	Grand Southern Trunk Road (Old NH45)	Villupuram	7.10	KM 157/35 to KM 164/45 (Villupuram)
SHU139	OSM	Vikravandi - Kumbakonam - Thanjavour Road (Old NH45C)	Cuddalore	1.075	KM 0/0 to KM 0/525 and KM 0/635 to KM 1/185 (Panruti)
SHU140	OSM	Vikravandi - Kumbakonam - Thanjavour Road (Old NH45C)	Cuddalore	0.400	KM 0/0 to KM 0/4 (Sethiyathoppu)
SHU141		Trichy - Chidambaram Road (Old NH227)		1.20	KM 76/7 to KM 77/9, modified as SHU167
SHU142	OSM	Chennai - Chittoor - Bangalore Road (Old NH4)	Chengalpattu	2.10	KM 48/8 to KM 50/9 (Sunguvarchatiram)
SHU143	OSM	Chennai - Chittoor - Bangalore Road (Old NH4)	Vellore	1.85	KM 121/9 to KM 123/75 (Thiruvalam)
SHU144	OSM	Krishnagiri - Ranipet Road (Old NH46)	Vaniyambadi	8.15	KM 34/2 to KM 36/4 (Nattrampalli), KM 49/4 to KM 53/2 (Vaniyambadi) and KM 74/35 to KM 76/5 (Pachaikuppam)
SHU144	OSM	Nagapattinam - Gudalur - Mysore Road (Old NH67)	Karur	9.55	KM 168/9 to KM 178/45 (Kulithalai)
SHU145	OSM	Veerarakkiyam - Gandhigramam - Sukkaliyur Road (Old NH67)	Karur	14.66	KM 203/34 to KM 218/0 (Karur)
SHU146	OSM	Grand Southern Trunk Road (Old NH45)	Kallakurichi	6.20	KM 0/0 to KM 6/2 (Ulundurpet)
SHU146	OSM	Nagapattinam - Gudalur - Mysore Road (Old NH67)	Karur	0.61	KM 248/4 to KM 249/4 (Vairamadai)
SHU147	OSM	Cuddalore ROB	Cuddalore	1.007	
SHU147	OSM	Pasupathypalayam Link Road	Karur	0.60	
SHU148	OSM	Chennai - Tiruthani - Renigunta Road	Tiruvallur	22.00	KM 59/6 to KM 81/6, as of Mar-19 section between SH234 and NH16 is part of NH716
SHU149	OSM	Varanasi - Kanniyakumari Road (Old NH7)	Tirunelveli	5.675	KM 192/445 to KM 198/120 (Valliyoor)
SHU150	OSM	Varanasi - Kanniyakumari Road (Old NH7)	Tirunelveli	1.505	KM 221/145 to KM 222/65 (Therku Karungulam)

=== SHU151 to SHU223 ===
Road number	OSM relation	Name of road	Division	Length (in km)	Remarks
SHU151	OSM	Varanasi - Kanniyakumari Road (Old NH7)	Tirunelveli	1.37	KM 223/03 to KM 224/4 (Levinjipuram)
SHU152	OSM	Varanasi - Kanniyakumari Road (Old NH7)	Tirunelveli	1.145	KM 217/255 to KM 218/4 (Pazhavoor)
SHU153	OSM	Nagapattinam - Gudalur - Mysore Road (Old NH67)	Trichy	11.00	KM 142/0 to KM 153/0 (Trichy)
SHU154	OSM	Chennai - Trichy - Dindigul Road (Old NH45)	Trichy	8.00	KM 325/0 to KM 333/0 (Trichy)
SHU155	OSM	Salem - Cochin - Kanniyakumari Road (Old NH47)	Tiruppur	7.59	KM 112/94 to KM 120/53 (Avinashi)
SHU157	OSM	Trichy - Ramanathapuram Road (Old NH210)	Pudukkottai	14.25	KM 44/7 to KM 58/95 (Pudukkottai)
SHU158	OSM	Trichy - Ramanathapuram Road (Old NH210)	Pudukkottai	2.90	KM 67/2 to KM 70/1 (Thirumayam)
SHU159	OSM	Trichy - Ramanathapuram Road (Old NH210)	Sivagangai	20.80	KM 76/4 to KM 97/2 (Karaikkudi)
SHU161	OSM	Pondy - Krishnagiri Road (Old NH66)	Tiruvannamalai	10.08	KM 86/35 to KM 89/07 (Kil Pennathur), KM 101/5 to KM 111/56 (Tiruvannamalai) and KM 136/42 to KM 141/72 (Chengam)
SHU164	OSM	Varanasi - Kanniyakumari Road (Old NH7)	Palani	4.60	KM 355/95 to KM 360/55 (Vedasandur)
SHU165	OSM	Varanasi - Kanniyakumari Road (Old NH7)	Dindigul	3.07	KM 399/08 to KM 402/15 (Kodai Road)
SHU167	OSM	Trichy - Chidambaram Road (Old NH227)	Ariyalur	1.20	KM 76/7 to KM 77/9 (Udayarpalayam)
SHU168	OSM	Pondy - Krishnagiri Road (Old NH66)	Villupuram	5.40	KM 6/8 to KM 12/2 (Thiruchitrambalam)
SHU169	OSM	Pondy - Krishnagiri Road (Old NH66)	Villupuram	4.00	KM 18/6 to KM 22/6 (Kiliyanur)
SHU170	OSM	Thuraiyur Bypass Road	Trichy	3.40	
SHU171	OSM	Dharapuram Bypass Road (Phase-I)	Dharapuram	3.60	
SHU172	OSM	Dharapuram Bypass Road (Phase-II)	Dharapuram	1.20	
SHU173	OSM	Salem - Cochin - Kanniyakumari Road (Old NH47)	Tiruppur	3.295	KM 0/0 to KM 3/295 (Perumanallur)
SHU174	OSM	Salem - Cochin - Kanniyakumari Road (Old NH47)	Tiruppur	1.255	KM 0/0 to KM 1/255 (Pallagoundampalayam)
SHU175	OSM	Salem - Cochin - Kanniyakumari Road (Old NH47)	Tiruppur	1.145	KM 0/0 to KM 1/145 (Chengapalli)
SHU176	OSM	Gobi - Uthukuli - Padiyur Road (Old SH81)	Tiruppur	0.68	KM 0/0 to KM 0/68 (Uthukuli)
SHU181	OSM	Varanasi - Kanniyakumari Road (Old NH7)	Nagercoil	1.875	KM 224/4 to KM 226/275 (Anjugramam), runs from another SHU at Kanniyakumari border
SHU185	OSM	Vandavasi Bypass Road	Cheyyar	2.20	
SHU217	OSM	Thanjavur - Manamadurai Road (Old NH226)	Pudukkottai	14.045	KM 28/6 to KM 29/885 (Adhanakottai), KM 47/46 to KM 56/46 (Pudukkottai), KM 72/1 to KM 74/185 (Thirumayam), KM 75/335 to KM 77/01 (Paralipattinam)
SHU218	OSM	Thanjavur - Manamadurai Road (Old NH226)	Sivagangai	20.25	KM 93/8 to KM 100/4 (Thiruppathur), KM 105/0 to KM 106/4 (Thirukoshtiyur), KM 127/2 to KM 134/75 (Sivagangai), KM 145/8 to KM 150/5 (Manamadurai)
SHU220	OSM	Kollam - Theni Road (Old NH220)	Theni	22.55	KM 0/0 to KM 3/09 (Theni), KM 0/0 to KM 2/1 (Veerapandi), KM 0/0 to KM 3/25 (Chinnamanur), KM 0/0 to KM 4/58 (Uthamapalayam), KM 0/0 to KM 5/7 (Cumbum) and KM 0/0 to KM 3/83 (Cudalur)
SHU221	OSM	Trichy - Ramanathapuram Road (Old NH210)	Pudukkottai	4.40	KM 24/2 to KM 28/6 (Keeranur)
SHU223	OSM	Pondicherry Bypass Road	Villupuram	1.506	runs till Puducherry border
Total					869.112

== See also ==
- National Highways Authority of India
- List of major district roads in Tamil Nadu
- National highways of India
- List of national highways in India
- Road network in Tamil Nadu
- Chennai bypass
- Coimbatore bypass
