= Mimisal =

Village in India

- village
- Location in Tamil Nadu, India Mimisal (India)
- Coordinates: 9°56′N 79°10′E
- Country: India
- State: Tamil Nadu
- District: Pudukkottai

Population (2001)
  - Total: 2,793

Languages
  - Official: Tamil
- Time zone: UTC+5:30 (IST)
- Postal code: 614621

Mimisal is a coastal village in the Avadaiyarkoil revenue block of Pudukkottai district, Tamil Nadu, India.

== Demographics ==
At the 2011 census, Mimisal had a total population of 2,793, with 1,430 males and 1,363 females. Out of the total population, 2,026 people were literate.
