= Kullanchavadi =

- Sub Village
- Location in Tamil Nadu, India Kullanchavadi (India)
- Coordinates: 11.625671°N 79.674489°E
- Country: India
- State: Tamil Nadu
- District: Cuddalore

Government
  - Type: Democracy

Languages
  - Official: Tamil
- Time zone: UTC+5:30 (IST)
- PIN: 607301
- Telephone code: 04142
- Vehicle registration: TN-31

Kullanchavadi is a Village located in Cuddalore district of Tamilnadu

small town along the NH 532 in the Kurinjipadi Taluk in Cuddalore district of Tamil Nadu, India.[1] It covers part of Vazhudhalambattu, Ambalavananpettai, Appiyampettai and Agaram Panchayaths. It is located 20 km towards south from district headquarters Cuddalore.

Panruti, Parangipettai, Neyveli, Nellikuppam, Kurinjipadi, Vadalur and Cuddalore are the nearby towns to Kullanchavadi.
