= Gunaseelam =

Village in Tiruchirapalli district, Tamil Nadu, India

Coordinates: 10°54′N 78°34′E

Gunaseelam is a village located in Tiruchirapalli district, Tamil Nadu state, India.

== Government hospitals in Gunaseelam ==
- Kottathur
- Pulivalam
- Veliyanur

== Banks in Gunaseelam ==
- SYNDICATE BANK - GUNASEELAM AMOOR

== Schools in Gunaseelam ==
- P.U.M.S GUNASEELAM
