= State Highway 9 (Tamil Nadu) =

Road in Tamil Nadu, India

State Highway 9

Location
- Country: India
- State: Tamil Nadu

Highway system
- Roads in India; Expressways; National; State; Asian; State Highways in Tamil Nadu
← SH 6	→ SH 10

State Highway 9 (SH-9) in Tamil Nadu, India connects Cuddalore with Chittoor. Total length of SH-9 is 212 km.

SH-9 Route: Cuddalore - Nellikuppam - Panruti - Thiruvamur - Madapattu - Tirukkoyilur - Thiruvannamalai - Polur - Vellore city - Chittoor

== Way ==
Many cities in four districts in Tamil Nadu on the road connecting . In each district, on the road, the main areas are listed below.

- Cuddalore: Nellikkuppam, Melpattampakkam, Panruti, Thiruvamur.
- Villupuram: Madappattu, Tirukkoyilur.
- Thiruvannamalai: Tiruvannamalai, Polur, Kannamangalam.
- Vellore: Vellore city.

== Highway meetings ==
State Highway 9, National Highway 45C pannurutti to the point, National Highway 45 matappattu to the point, National Highway 66 to the point of Tiruvannamalai, National Highway 46 tend to cut across velurilum.

Many state highways cut across this Highway. Certain roads which are listed below.

- State Highway 68 at Panruti
- State Highway 69 at Periya Sevalai
- State Highway 68 at Tirukkoyilur
- State Highway 7, at Tirukkoyilur
- State Highway 135 at Tiruvannamalai
- State Highway 115 at Polur
- State Highway 59 at Katpadi, vellore city
