= Road network in Tamil Nadu =

Highway system in Tamil Nadu, India

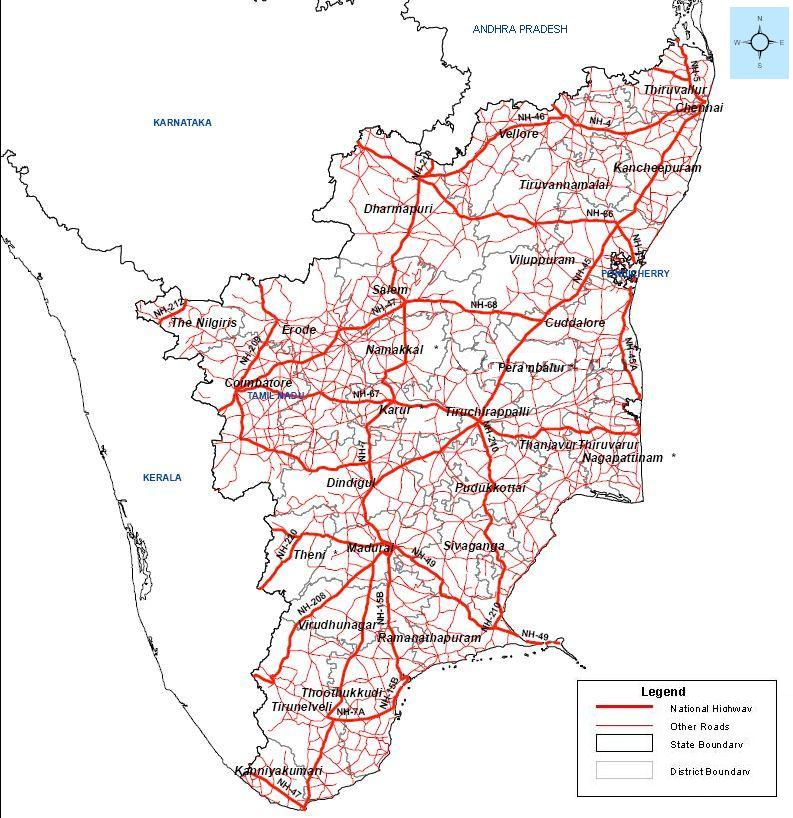
Map indicating highway network of Tamil Nadu

In Tamil Nadu, the Highways & Minor Ports Department (HMPD) is primarily responsible for construction and maintenance of roads including national highways, state highways and major district roads. HMPD was established as Highways Department (HD) in April 1946 and subsequently renamed on 30 October 2008. It operates through seven wings namely National Highways Wing, Construction & Maintenance Wing, NABARD and Rural Roads Wing, Projects Wing, Metro Wing, Tamil Nadu Road Sector Project Wing, Investigation and Designs Wing geographically spread across the state in 38 districts with about 120 divisions and 450 subdivisions.

== Road network ==
As of 2023, Tamil Nadu has an extensive road network covering about 2.71 lakh km with a road density of 2,084.71 kilometres (1,295.38 mi) per 1000 km^{2} which is higher than the national average of 1,926.02 kilometres (1,196.77 mi) per 1000 km^{2}. The Highways Department (HD) of the state is primarily responsible for construction and maintenance of national highways, state highways, major district roads and other roads in the state. It operates through eleven wings with 120 divisions and 450 subdivisions.

Road length in TN
Type	NH	SH	MDR	ODR	OR	Total
Length (km)	6,805	12,291	12,034	42,057	197,542	271,000

=== National highways ===
Road stretches that have heavy traffic intensity of more than 30,000 passenger car units (PCUs) connecting different state capitals, major ports, large industrial areas and tourist centers are designated National Highway by the Indian government. National Highways wing of the highways and minor ports department, established in 1971, is responsible for improving, maintaining, and renewing of national highways as laid down by the National Highways Authority of India (NHAI). National Highways wing exercises central government funds from the Ministry of Road Transport and Highways for improvement works. There are 48 national highways of length 6,805 kilometres (4,228 mi) in the state.

National highway length in Tamil Nadu
Lanes	Two	Four	Six	Eight	Total
Length (km)	3,814	2,649	333	9	6,805

=== State highways ===
Road stretches with heavy traffic intensity of more than 10,000 PCUs but less than 30,000 PCUs, which connects district headquarters, important towns and the National Highways in the State and neighboring States are declared as State Highways. Construction & Maintenance wing of Highways Department looks after Construction, Maintenance of all the State Highways (SH), Major District Roads (MDR), Other District Roads (ODR). The wing has eight circles namely Chennai, Coimbatore, Madurai, Salem, Tiruchirappalli, Tirunelveli, Tiruppur, and Villupuram.

State highway length in Tamil Nadu
Lanes	One	Intermediate	Two	Four	Six	Total
Length (km)	39	366	10,170	1,466	250	12,291

=== Major district roads ===
Roads with traffic density less than 10,000 PCUs but more than 5,000 PCUs are designated as Major District Roads (MDR). Major District Roads provide linkage between production and marketing centers within a district. It also provides connectivity for district and taluk headquarters with state highways and national highways. Construction and Maintenance wing of Highways Department executes construction and maintenance of MDRs along with State Highways. These roads have a minimum width of 15 metres (49 ft).

=== Other district roads ===
Roads with traffic density less than 5,000 PCUs are categorized as Other District Roads (ODR). ODRs provides road connectivity for major rural production hubs, block headquarters and taluk headquarters. Similar to SH and MDRs, Construction and Maintenance wing of Highways Department executes ODR related works.

=== Rural & sugarcane roads ===
NABARD and the Rural Roads Wing of Highways and Minor Ports Department carry out construction and maintenance of rural roads along with Pradhan Mantri Gram Sadak Yojana. NABARD and state government shares the funds required for the development of rural roads. In 2010, NABARD sanctioned ₹816 crore (US$97 million) for augmentation of 508 rural roads in 30 districts, upgrading 44 district roads and 39 major district roads in 18 districts and construction of 121 bridges in 31 districts of the state.

=== Other roads ===
==== East Coast Road ====
The East Coast Road was the first project implemented by Tamil Nadu Road Development Company (TNRDC) in the year 2002. ECR Road runs from Kudumiyandithoppu till outskirts of Pondicherry for a total length of 113 km (70 mi). Recently Tamil Nadu Government has upgraded the ECR road till Mahabalipuram to four lanes at a cost of ₹672 crore (US$79 million).

==== Coimbatore Bypass ====
Coimbatore Bypass is a series of bypasses connecting the various National Highways and State Highways passing through and originating in Coimbatore. The first section of the bypass was a 28-kilometre (17 mi) two-laned road with paved shoulders built by Larsen & Toubro (L&T) from Neelambur to Madukkarai on National Highway 544 (formerly National Highway 47), which intersects Trichy Road at Chintamani Pudur near Irugur and Eachanari on Pollachi Road. It was the first road privatisation project to be implemented on a build-operate-transfer model in South India. The National Highways Authority of India is conducting studies for a bypass along the Mettupalayam–Sulur National Highways 81 and 181 (formerly National Highway 67). The proposed length of this road is 53.95 kilometres (33.52 mi), and is expected to cost ₹6.01 billion (US$71 million) to build. In 2010, an announcement was made in the State Budget to build a Western Ring Road at a cost of ₹ 2.84 billion for 26 km. The proposed road would have been from Madukarai near ACC Cement industry, starting on Palakkad Road connecting Mettupalayam Road via Perur Road, Marudamalai Road and Thadagam Road.

==== IT Expressway ====
The road stretch from Madhya Kailash in Adyar to Mahabalipuram in Kanchipuram district, which in turn connects with the East Coast Road, is called the Rajiv Gandhi Salai or IT Expressway. TNRDC developed this road stretch in two phases with widening of Madhya Kailash to Siruseri road stretch to six lanes in the first phase and widening of Siruseri to Mamallapuram of road stretch I in the second phase.

==== Ennore-Manali Road Improvement Project ====
The Ennore–Manali Road Improvement Project (EMRIP) was developed by a special purpose vehicle formed by National Highways Authority of India (NHAI), Chennai Port Trust (CPT), Ennore Port Limited (EPL) and Tamil Nadu Government (GoTN) at a cost of Rs 600 crore. The project was announced by the State Government in 1998 to cover industrial hotspots of north Chennai such as Manali Oil Refinery Road, Tiruvottiyur–Ponneri-Panchetti (TPP) Road, Ennore Expressway and northern portion of the Inner Ring Road from Madhavaram to Manali.

==== Chennai Port – Maduravoyal Expressway ====
The 19 km (12 mi) long Chennai Port – Maduravoyal Expressway is being developed Chennai Port Trust and Government of Tamil Nadu on 50:50 cost sharing basis. The ₹1,655 crore (US$200 million) Elevated Expressway project was awarded to Hyderabad based Soma Enterprises.

==== Outer Ring Road project ====
The 62-km long Outer Ring Road with six lanes from Vandalur to Minjur via Nemellichery was awarded to GMR consortium by Chennai Metropolitan Development Authority to implement the project on a Design, Build, Finance, Operate and Transfer (DBFOT) basis. The project is proposed to be developed at a cost of ₹1,000 crore (US$120 million) in two phases. In the first phase, the 30 km (19 mi) long stretch of road from Vandalur in NH-45 to Nemellichery in NH-205 via Nazrathpet in NH4 is to be developed. The 30 km (19 mi) long stretch of road between Thiruninravur Nemellichery to Thiruvottiyur-Ponneri-Panchetti in Minjur is under construction. It acts as a linkage between Grand Southern Trunk Road (NH-45), Bangalore–Chennai Road (NH 4) and Tirupathi–Chennai Road.

==== Chennai Peripheral Ring Road ====
The proposed Chennai Peripheral Ring Road starts at Ennore port travels through the proposed Northern Port Access Road and connects Mamallapuram near Poonjeri junction of East Coast Road (ECR). The government sanctioned Rs. 10 crore for the preparation of Detailed Project Report (DPR) for this work and the same has been completed.
