= R. Ponnappan Nadar =

Indian politician (1921–1976)

Member of Madras State (later Tamil Nadu) Legislative Assembly
- In office 15 March 1971 – 31 January 1976
- Preceded by: Himself
- Succeeded by: D. Gnanasigamony (1977-80)
- Constituency: Vilavancode
- In office 1 March 1967 – 5 January 1971
- Preceded by: M. William
- Succeeded by: Himself
- Constituency: Vilavancode
- In office 1962–1967
- Preceded by: A. Nesamony
- Succeeded by: M. William
- Constituency: Killiyoor

Member of Travancore-Cochin Legislative Assembly
- In office 1954 – September 1956
- Preceded by: Himself
- Succeeded by: A. Nesamony (1957-62)
- Constituency: Killiyoor
- In office 1952–1954
- Preceded by: Position established
- Succeeded by: Himself
- Constituency: Killiyoor

Personal details
- Born: 11 April 1921 or 3 March 1923 Palavilai, Southern Division, Kingdom of Travancore, British India (now in Kanniyakumari district, Tamil Nadu, India)
- Died: 12 October 1976 (aged 53 or 55) Sahar Airport, Bombay (now CSMI Airport, Mumbai), Maharashtra, India
- Party: Travancore Tamil Nadu Congress (1945-57); Indian National Congress (1962-69; 7?-76): Indian National Congress (Organisation) (1971-7?)
- Spouse: Roselet (m. 1949)
- Relations: S. Rajeshkumar (grand-nephew ?)
- Children: Pon. Vijayaraghavan; Kasturi, Rajeswari; Raveendran; Krishnakumar; Vijayalakshmi
- Parent(s): Ammal (mother); N. Raghavan (father)
- Cause of death: Crash of Indian Airlines Flight 171

Raghavan Ponnappa Nadar also known as Mayavi Ponnappan, (11 April 1921 – 12 October 1976), was an Indian politician from present-day Kanniyakumari district, Tamil Nadu. He represented the Killiyoor constituency during 1952-56 in the Travancore-Cochin Legislative Assembly. After the Merger of Kanyakumari with Madras State (the predecessor of Tamil Nadu), he once again represented Kiliyoor in the Madras State Legislative Assembly during 1962-67. Later, he represented the Vilavancode constituency in the Assembly during 1967-76.

== Early life ==
Ponnappa Nadar was born on 11 April 1921 in Palavilai (a village near Karungal in Kanniyakumari district) to Ammal and N. Raghavan. His eldest son is Pon. Vijayaraghavan, who is a three time MLA from Killiyoor Constituency. He had two sisters and a brother named Thangappan (the grandson of one of those sisters is S. Rajeshkumar MLA, who has been representing Killiyoor constituency in the Tamil Nadu Legislative Assembly since 2016).

Ponnappa Nadar attended St. Antony's Elementary School, Munchirai Government Middle School, and Eraniel Higher Secondary School. He completed his ESLC examination in 1937. He completed his B.A. degree at the Thiruvananthapuram Maharaja College in 1942, and secured University Third Rank. He later completed his degree in law in 1944 at the Thiruvananthapram College of Law. He married Roselet, on 11 November 1949.

== Schooling ==
Ponnappa Nadar started his schooling a grade in advance, being admitted directly into the second standard. He did his schooling at three different schools, namely St. Antony's Elementary School (II to IV standard), Munchirai Government Middle School (V to VIII form), and Eraniel Higher Secondary School (IX to E.S.L.C). He completed his E.S.L.C examination in 1937.

== Higher Studies ==
Ponnappa Nadar completed his B.A. (Hons) degree at the Thiruvananthapuram Maharaja College in 1942 with flying colours securing the third rank at the university level, thus rendering him eligible to pursue his Masters Degree. During his college days, he excelled in several aspects, being a sportsperson in the games of Badminton, Hockey and Basketball. He also held the position of secretary at the university Honours Association. He was highly esteemed for his excellent English oratory skills. He later completed his degree in law in 1944 at the Thiruvananthapram College of Law.

== Family Life ==
Ponnappa Nadar married Roselet, the eldest daughter of Arumugakan Nadar of Pattavilai near Thikkanangode on 11.11.1949. They had six children, namely Pon Vijayaraghavan (lawyer and member of the Legislative Assembly), P. Kasthuri (homemaker), P. Rajeshwari (retired TMB Bank officer), Pon Ravindran (retired addl. chief engineer at the Tamil Nadu Electricity Board), Pon Krishnakumar (senior lawyer, ex vice president Nagercoil Bar Association), P. Vijayalakshmi (asst. professor).

== Legal career ==
Ponappa Nadar's brother-in-law introduced him to law by enabling him to work as a junior lawyer under the guidance of his family lawyer.

== Life as a young lawyer ==
Ponnappa Nadar's elder brother-in-law Gnanasigamani introduced him to the field of law by enabling him to work as a junior Lawyer under the guidance of his family lawyer Thiru A. Nesamony. During the tenure of being a junior, his mentor Thiru Nesamony noted that Ponnappa Nadar had an excellent academic profile. He thus advised the young Ponnappa Nadar "You can get yourself a good government job. But if you desire to become a lawyer, you need to work hard, and you will find it difficult to make money initially. Which of these two options do you prefer to choose?", to which he answered, "I am aware of this and I am ready to work as a junior lawyer". He used to work with his mentor till late at nights, studying cases and learning the tactics of law. His mentor Thiru Nesamony was impressed by his dedication and made him his chief representative. Ponappa Ponnappa Nadar was skilled in preparing points of argument to be delivered to the judges while at hearings. He was a good pleader.

== His career as a senior lawyer ==
Ponnappa Nadar excelled in his profession of law in the Kanyakumari District Sessions Court, during which he performed his duties as the president of the Nagercoil Bar Association. He was well known for his commendable oratory skills which gained him high appraisals from judges and senior Lawyers. Crowds would gather around the court hall to hear his arguments. District judges were so impressed with him that they felt his right place was at the High court. He was a legal luminary.

== Politics ==
On behalf of the now-defunct Travancore Tamil Nadu Congress party, Ponnappa Nadar was elected as a Member of the Legislative Assembly of Travancore-Cochin Legislative Assembly in 1952 from Killiyur constituency by defeating A. Gabriel of the Indian National Congress (INC). He received 17,084 votes against 2,718 votes for Gabriel. The total number of valid votes cast in the election was 25,512. He won the interim election in 1954 from the same constituency against Gabriel.

He was elected to the Tamil Nadu legislative assembly three times after Kanyakumari district merged with Tamil Nadu. He was elected from Killiyur constituency in 1962 election, and from Vilavancode constituency in 1967 and 1971 elections.

== Political Life ==
When he was studying at the Munchirai Middle School, the School authorities used to provide lunch for the students after segregating them into two groups based on their caste. Ponnappa Nadar was deeply hurt by this practice and refused to have the lunch that was provided. This incident played a crucial role in urging him to enter politics and social life. Another such incident was the unfair collection of crop produce as taxes in Thiruvadhancore. The farmers were made to pay their taxes compulsorily even when their crop did not produce sufficient yields. This unfair practice further enhanced his desire to enter politics and social life. Another such incident was the unfair collection of crop produce as taxes in Thiruvadhancore. The farmers were made to pay their taxes compulsorily even when their crop did not produce sufficient yields. This unfair practice further enhanced his desire to enter politics. During his college days in Thiruvananthapuram, he stayed at the Wills Students Hostel, where he provided food and accommodation to several freedom fighters. He joined the Congress movement at the age of 16 while he was still a school student. He secretly supported the freedom struggle along with the freedom fighters, former central minister Ravindravarma and the former member of the Parliament and Legislative Assembly Viswambaran, who were his colleagues, while he was at the Wills hostel.

There was a dispute between two groups at his native village where certain higher caste people at Thambadu prevented lower caste people from drawing water out of the neighbourhood well. Thiru Ponnappa Ponnappa Nadar opposed this practice and indulged himself in the fight for social equality. He joined the Congress in 1939. He then joined the Thiruvidhancore Tamilnadu Congress in 1945 which was founded for the freedom of the Thiruvidhancore Tamil people and later functioned as its Secretary. He wanted to contest in the 1947 elections, but he could not do so as his date of birth as per records prevented him from being eligible, though his actual age met the criteria. The then leader of the Thiruvidhancore Congress Sam Nathaniel was his first Political mentor. He was sent to jail several times for his struggle to append Thiruvidhancore to Tamilnadu. He won an astounding victory in the 1952 elections at the Killiyoor constituency. His five opponents had lost their election deposit. He was elected as the General Secretary of the Thiruvidhancore Tamilnadu Congress in 1952. The cabinet was dissolved in 1954 following which he won the elections again in the same year as a candidate representing the Thiruvidhancore Tamilnadu Congress. In the opposition led by the congress in 1954, he was arrested for violating the 144-prohibitory order as the fourth positioned opposition leader, and was given a sentence of 5 weeks, but was later released within 18 days. In 1955 a no confidence motion was held against the then chief minister Pattamthanupillai. The government had planned to arrest him before he could cast his vote. But he came to know of this and travelled to Thiruvananthapuram in disguise and stayed in the house of an Inspector General along with the then member of the Legislative Assembly Sattanadha Karayalar. He then entered the Legislative Assembly in disguise and cast his vote causing the cabinet of the chief minister to dissolve. He was then known as “Mayavi” Ponnappan for his act in disguise following this incident. A. Nesamony wanted to make him a minister in the Thiruvidhancore Tamil Congress Cabinet. But Ponnappa Nadar gave up his opportunity for A. Chidambaranatha Ponnappa Nadar. After Kanyakumari was appended to Tamilnadu in 1956, his mentor A. Nesamony desired to contest in the assembly elections held in 1957. And thus he gave up his candidature in the region of Killiyoor where he had won twice for the sake of his mentor to contest there. He was elected as the Congress district President in 1959. During this period, when there rose a difference of opinion between his mentor A. Nesamony and Thiru K. Kamaraj, Thiru Ponnappa Ponnappa Nadar negotiated between them, avoiding a major rift within the party.

During the 1962 general elections, he emerged victorious as the Congress candidate at Killiyoor. He worked intensively for implementing the “Sittraru Pattanangal” scheme in Vilavankode taluk for the proper distribution of water to the people of southern regions. In 1967, he contested and won as the Vilavancode Congress Candidate being elected as the Deputy leader of the opposition party. He was elected again for the same post in 1971. The then chief minister M. Karunanidhi had praised him for being an “excellent parliamentarian”. He received praise from the chief minister and all the members of the assembly for his critical speech about the Emergency implemented by the government. After the demise of his mentor A. Nesamony, he again gave up his chance of contesting in the Parliament elections for the sake of K. Kamarajar, enabling him to win an astounding victory. Though he was elected as MLA five times, he lived a very simple life. He never bought himself a car but travelled by government buses. K. Kamarajar praised him for his simple lifestyle and urged him to take more care of his health. He never availed himself of any special facilities from the government for his family or relatives. Even when he was awarded honour and compensations for his contribution in the freedom struggle, he would insist that they be given to the poor freedom fighters. While he was the leader of the opposition party, he also refused the vehicle facility and office staff facility provided to him by the government. After the death of K. Kamaraj on 02.10.1975, Ponnappa Ponnappa Nadar had brought the ashes of K. Kamarajar from Chennai to Thiruvananthapuram, and then to Nagercoil, where it was kept for one day for public to pay their tributes, followed by which he had dissolved it in the sea of Kanyakumari.

== Achievements ==
He successfully implemented the “Sittraru-Pattanangal” scheme for the people of Vilavankode thus enabling them to avail good drinking water and improving their irrigation. He was responsible for setting up of Aralvaimozhi cooperative spinning-mill thus providing jobs for several workers. He did yeoman service to the farmers especially the harvesters by fighting against a new government law which prohibited the movement of paddy from one taluk to another. The poor farmers who received sacks of paddy as wages for harvesting were in tragic plight. But Ponnappa Nadar represented their case to the government and got them exempted from the law. Besides, he led protests against another law which prohibited free movement of rice from one district to another. He organised agitations and bandhs and finally succeeded in getting the law repealed. Thus the price of rice which had rocketed in Kanyakumari district came down. Further he fought on behalf of those who participated in the struggle for the union of Kanyakumari district into Tamilnadu and pressurised the government to grant them pensions. Later, the government agreed to grant pensions to those who were in jail custody. He refused to accept his pension, but insisted on the poor being benefited.

== Positions held ==
- General Secretary of the Thiruvancore Tamilnadu Congress (1952-1956).
- President of the Nagercoil Bar Association (1958).
- Member of the All India Congress Committee.
- President Midalam Cooperative Society.
- Chairman Cooperative Spinning Mill Aralvaimozhi (1965-1967).
- Deputy-leader of the Opposition party at the Legislative Assembly (1967-1971).
- Chairman of Public Accounts Committee (1971-1976).
- Leader of the Opposition party at the Legislative Assembly (1971-1976).
- Vice President of the Tamilnadu Congress Party (1975-1976).
- One and only Member of the Tamilnadu Congress Property Trust from the district of Kanyakumari (1975-1976).
- President of the Nagercoil cooperative housing board (1971-1976).

== Death ==
On 8 October 1976, Ponnappa Nadar left for Bombay (now Mumbai, the capital of Maharashtra) to attend a conference scheduled on 10 October. After the conference, he had to return to Madras (now Chennai, the capital of Tamil Nadu) immediately on 11 October to attend a meeting of the Tamil Nadu Congress Working Committee. He boarded the Indian Airlines Flight 171 from Sahar Airport (now Chhatrapati Shivaji Maharaj International Airport) later that night. The aircraft, which had taken off from runway 27, experienced an engine failure and was forced to return to the airport. However, due to a fire in its engine, the aircraft lost control while approaching runway 9, plummeting from a height of 300 feet and hitting the ground at an angle of 45° on 12 October, 1:40 IST. It was only 1,000 feet from runway 9 at the time. All 95 people (passengers and crew) on board were killed, including Ponnappa Nadar.

Following cremation in Bombay, Ponnappa Nadar's ashes were brought to Madras, where a part was immersed in the sea at Marina Beach. The other part was brought to Palavilai, had rituals performed on it, and was immersed in the sea at Kanniyakumari.

== Descendants ==
Ponnappan had six children with Roselet.

- Pon. Vijayaraghavan - Lawyer; elected from Killiyur constituency as a Janata Party (JP) candidate (1977 and 1980) and as an Independent candidate in 1989. He is presently a member of the national general council of the Bharatiya Janata Party (BJP).
- P. Kasthuri (Homemaker)
- P. Rajeshwari (Retired TMB Bank Officer)
- Pon Ravindran (Retired Addl. Chief Engineer at the Tamil Nadu Electricity Board)
- Pon Krishnakumar (Senior Lawyer, Ex Vice President Nagercoil Bar Association)
- Dr. P. Vijayalakshmi (Asst. Professor)

== Legacy ==
On 16 April 2025, M. P. Saminathan, Tamil Nadu's Minister for Tamil Development and Information, announced in the Tamil Nadu Legislative Assembly that a statue of Ponnappa Nadar would be installed in Nagercoil city at a cost of INR. 50 lakhs to mark the leader's centenary.
