= November 1923 =

Month of 1923

<<	November 1923					>>
Su	Mo	Tu	We	Th	Fr	Sa
				1	2	3
4	5	6	7	8	9	10
11	12	13	14	15	16	17
18	19	20	21	22	23	24
25	26	27	28	29	30

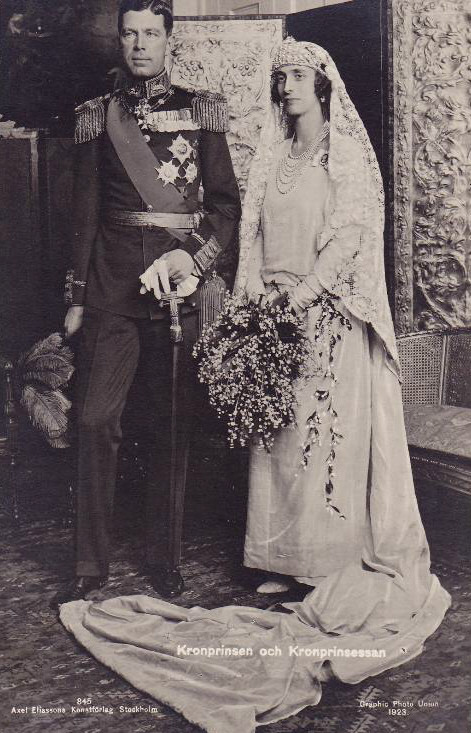
November 3, 1923: Sweden's Crown Prince Gustav VI Adolf marries Britain's Princess Louise Mountbatten at London

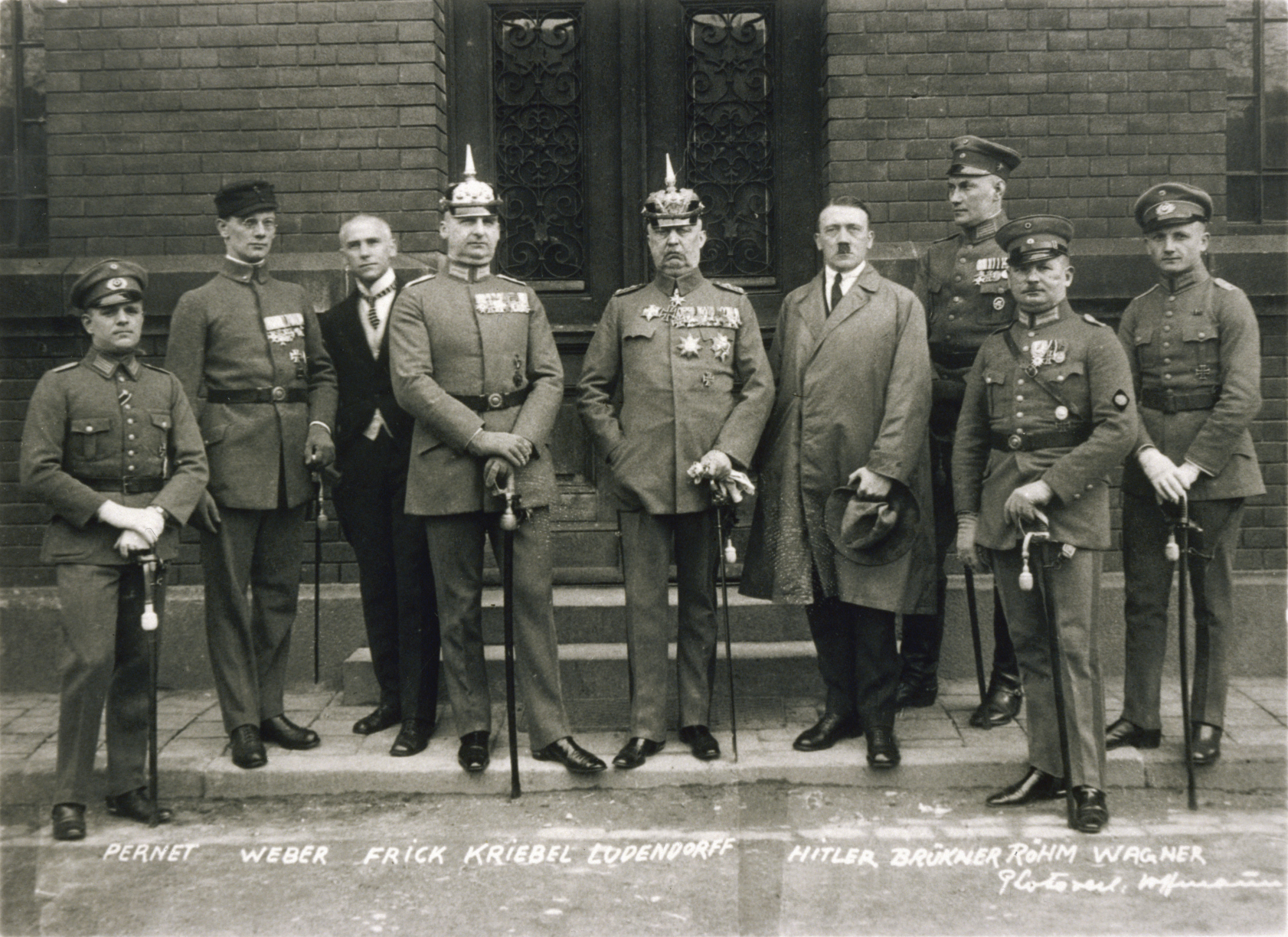
November 8, 1923: German Nazis led by General Erich Ludendorff (center) and Adolf Hitler (next to Ludendorff) attempt to overthrow government of Bavaria.

The following events occurred in November 1923:

== November 1, 1923 (Thursday) ==
- Imprisoned steel industrialist Gustav Krupp von Bohlen und Halbach signed an agreement with the French government establishing conditions under which the Krupp mines in the Ruhr would resume work. Krupp was released from prison 14 days later.
- The governments of Estonia and Latvia signed a mutual defense treaty and military alliance. Latvia renounced all claims it had made on Ruhnu island in the Gulf of Riga.
- The Finnish airline Finnair was founded by Bruno Lucander under the name "Aero Osakeyhtiö" (Aero Joint Stock Company), abbreviated to Aero O/Y. Lucander's sole aircraft at first was a single-engine Junkers F.13 seaplane, used for flying a route between Helsinki and Tallinn. In 1947, the company would be renamed Finnish Airlines, shortened to Finnair in 1949.
- Born:
  - Victoria de los Ángeles, Spanish singer; in Barcelona, Spain (d. 2005)
  - Gordon R. Dickson, Canadian science fiction writer; in Edmonton, Canada (d. 2001)
- Died: Bill Lovett, 29, Irish-American gangster and retired leader of New York's White Hand Gang; murdered while sleeping in an abandoned store at 25 Bridge Street in Brooklyn, after a night of drinking at Sand's Saloon (b. 1894)

== November 2, 1923 (Friday) ==
- Silent film star Margaret Gibson was arrested at her home in Los Angeles on federal charges of operating a blackmail and extortion ring, charges that were later dropped. She performed under her own name from 1913 to 1917, and later as Patricia Palmer from 1918 to 1929.
- U.S. Navy Lieutenant Harold J. Brow set a new flight airspeed record at the Mineola airfield on New York's Long Island, becoming the first person to fly faster than 400 kilometers per hour and the first of more than 250 miles per hour. Brow, competing against Navy Lieutenant Alford J. Williams, averaged 417.07 kilometres per hour (259.16 mph) over a three-kilometer course.
- Three Socialist members of the Gustav Stresemann cabinet resigned in protest of the government's refusal to curb the powers of the dictatorial regime in Bavaria.
- The Reichsbank issued a 100 trillion-mark banknote.
- David Lloyd George gave a final speech at the Metropolitan Opera House as he ended his tour of North America. Lloyd George defended the Treaty of Versailles as "the best treaty that could have been negotiated under the circumstances at that time" and said it was not the treaty that was responsible for the present problems of Europe, but "the completeness of the victory. It was the most complete victory that has almost ever been won in wars between great nations. Germany-Austria were shattered, demoralized, disarmed, prostrated; we left them like broken backed creatures on the road for any chariot to run over." He added that Europe must be given "the conviction that right is supreme over force. Who is to do it? There are only two countries on Earth which can establish that conviction, and those are the United States of America and the British Empire. Unless it is done, I do not know what is going to happen."
- Born:
  - Cesare Rubini, Italian professional basketball player and coach, won 15 national championships from 1950 to 1972 as the coach of Olimpia Milano; in Trieste, Kingdom of Italy (present-day Italy) (d. 2011)
  - Dr. Charles Kamalam Job, Indian surgeon and medical researcher in the study of leprosy; in Palliyadi, Madras Province, British India (present-day Tamil Nadu state, India) (d. 2012)
- Died:
  - Lim Chin Tsong, 56, Chinese-Burmese businessman and philanthropist (b. 1867)
  - Stevan Aleksić, 46, Serbian Romanian painter (b. 1876)

== November 3, 1923 (Saturday) ==
- Crown Prince Gustav Adolf of Sweden married Louise Mountbatten at St James's Palace.
- U.S. Army Captain Harold Kullberg performed the first arrest in the United States for violation of air traffic rules. While flying, Kullberg noticed a plane that was stunt flying over Akron, Ohio. When the plane landed at Stowe airfield, Kullberg did as well and arrested pilot Howard Calvert and passenger Frank O'Neill.
- The New York Renaissance the first all-black professional basketball team, commonly called "The Rens", played its first game, defeating the "Collegiate Five", a group of white former college basketball players, 28 to 22. The game took place at the Renaissance Casino and Ballroom in the Harlem section of New York City.
- German President Friedrich Ebert refused the request of General Hans von Seeckt for dictatorial powers in law enforcement in Bavaria.
- In Australia, two people were killed, and 150 injured in rioting as a result of the Victorian Police strike in Melbourne.
- Born:
  - Violetta Prokhorova Elvin, Russian prima ballerina and actress; as Violetta Prokhorova, in Moscow, Russian SFSR (present-day Russia) (d. 2021)
  - Tomás Ó Fiaich, Northern Irish Catholic prelate, Archbishop of Armagh and a Cardinal from 1979 until his death; in Cullyhanna, County Armagh, Northern Ireland (d. 1990)
  - Moreno de Souza, Portuguese Jesuit priest in the Portugal's Goa colony, translator of the Holy Bible into the Konkani language; in Pilerne, Goa, Portuguese India (present-day India) (d. 2007)

== November 4, 1923 (Sunday) ==
- Nationalist groups including monarchists and Nazis paraded in Munich during a memorial ceremony for war dead in which a corner stone was laid for a new monument. Crown Prince Rupprecht, Otto von Lossow and Eugen von Knilling were among those in attendance. Adolf Hitler plotted to use this occasion to launch a putsch by kidnapping the Bavarian leaders and declaring a revolution from the reviewing stand, but he abandoned the plan after seeing the large police presence on the scene.
- The Australian government issued an appeal to fit men of military age to enroll as special constables as the Victorian Police strike entered its fourth full day. The strike gradually petered out with the hiring of these Specials.
- United States Navy Lieutenant Alford J. Williams broke the flight airspeed record just two days after it has been set, flying at 429.02 kilometres per hour (266.58 mph) at Mineola.
- Born:
  - John Powell, British physicist who created the EMI brain scanner and body scanner; in Islip, Oxfordshire, England (d. 1996)
  - Freddy Heineken, Dutch billionaire who built the Heineken International beer brewing company into a worldwide organization; as Alfred Henry Heineken, in Amsterdam, Netherlands (d. 2002)
  - Eugene Sledge, U.S. Marine and later a historian whose combat experiences were chronicled in the PBS documentary The War, and the HBO drama series The Pacific; in Mobile, Alabama, United States (d. 2001)

== November 5, 1923 (Monday) ==
- A plebiscite on prohibition was held in the Canadian province of Alberta on whether to retain the 1916 prohibition of sales of liquor. Voters opted overwhelmingly in favor of the sale of liquor by government-licensed stores, with 57.7% of the vote.
- Voters in the Scottish town of Falkirk, Stirlingshire, opted overwhelmingly in favor of the local sale of liquor as the first of 26 Scot towns to vote on the issue.
- Representatives of Germany and the Soviet Union signed an extension of the 1922 Treaty of Rapallo that had been made with the Russian SFSR alone. The new agreement extended the same terms between Germany and the other members of the U.S.S.R., the Ukrainian SSR, Byelorussian SSR, Armenian SSR, Georgian SSR, and the Azerbaijani SSR.
- A mob of poor and unemployed Berliners stormed the Grenadierstrasse and attacked Jews whom they blamed for the high prices of food.
- The trial of Maurice Conradi, who had assassinated Soviet peace conference delegate Vatslav Vorovsky on May 10, began in Switzerland at Lausanne.
- Prominent Ku Klux Klan figure William S. Coburn was shot dead in his office in Atlanta by a member of a rival Klan faction.

== November 6, 1923 (Tuesday) ==
- A coal mine explosion killed 27 miners of the Raleigh-Wyoming Coal Company in Glen Rogers, West Virginia. Another 36 survived because the mine had been equipped with the most modern ventilation system available at that time.
- A least 18 striking workers, and 14 soldiers, were killed in a riot in Kraków in Poland. The uprising started when a policeman fired into a crowd of demonstrators as they entered Main Market Square.
- Born: Nizoramo Zaripova, Soviet Tajik feminist and acting head of state of the Tadzhik SSR in 1984; in Pusheni, Uzbek SSR (present-day Tajikistan) (d. 2024)

== November 7, 1923 (Wednesday) ==
- The Imperial Conference approved a protectionist tariff plan that would give favorable treatment to Empire goods.
- The Imperial Conference also accepted, in modified form, an American plan to thwart rum-running by British vessels. It would give the United States authority to search and seize British ships suspected of containing contraband alcohol within a certain proximity to American shores, while British ships in return would be allowed to bring liquor to American ports under seal when intended for outbound consumption.
- Heavyweight boxer Billy Miske, despite being terminally ill with kidney disease, fought his final bout, ending in an upset of Bill Brennan with a fourth-round knockout. Both Miske and Brennan had fought championship bouts with Jack Dempsey in 1920. Miske died less than eight weeks after his retirement from the ring.

== November 8, 1923 (Thursday) ==
- The Beer Hall Putsch began in Munich as Adolf Hitler and 603 members of his Nazi Party's Storm Troopers surrounded a large beer hall, Der Bürgerbräukeller, where Bavaria's State Commissioner Gustav Ritter von Kahr was making a speech to 3,000 people. Hitler announced that the Bavarian government of Eugen von Knilling had been deposed and that General Erich Ludendorff would form a new government.
- The Imperial Conference ended with an agreement that Dominions would be allowed to sign their own treaties with foreign countries.
- Born:
  - Jack Kilby, American electrical engineer and 2000 Nobel Prize in Physics laureate for his role in inventing the first integrated circuit, as well as the handheld calculator and the thermal printer; in Jefferson City, Missouri, United States (d. 2005)
  - Józef Hen, Polish novelist, playwright and screenwriter; as Józef Henryk Cukier, in Warsaw, Poland
- Died:
  - John Davey, 77, English-born American agriculture specialist, environmentalist and pioneer of tree surgery (b. 1846)
  - Fusakichi Omori, 55, Japanese seismologist who formulated Omori's law for the prediction of the timing of aftershocks following an initial earthquake; died of a brain tumor (b. 1868)

== November 9, 1923 (Friday) ==
- Gustav Ritter von Kahr revoked his support of Hitler, issuing a statement at 7:45 a.m. on behalf of himself, Lossow and von Seisser that their pledges the day before had been extorted under duress and were "null and void". With the putsch having stalled, Ludendorff led a hastily arranged 11:00 a.m. march with 2,000 men on the center of Munich, until police fired on the putschists and dispersed them. Four police officers, 15 Nazis, and one bystander were killed in the gun battle. Ludendorff was arrested, but Hermann Göring and Hitler were among those who escaped.
- The Nazi Party was banned throughout Germany after its members had attempted the coup d'état.
- David Lloyd George disembarked in Southampton and walked right into the fight on Stanley Baldwin's protectionist tariff policy, which Lloyd George called "an unutterable, unintelligible folly."
- Born:
  - Alice Coachman, American high jump athlete and the first African American woman to win an Olympic gold medal in 1948; in Albany, Georgia, United States (d. 2014)
  - Sugiura Shigemine, Japanese fighter pilot celebrated as a supernatural figure in Taiwan as Feihu Jiangjun since his death; in Mito, Ibaraki Prefecture, Empire of Japan (present-day Japan) (d. 1944, killed in plane crash)
  - Katarina Josipi, Albanian-Yugoslavian actress; as Katë Dulaj, in Zym, Yugoslavia (present-day Kosovo) (d. 1969)
  - James Schuyler, American poet; in Chicago, United States (d. 1991)
- Died:
  - Max Erwin von Scheubner-Richter, 39, leader of the Aufbau Vereinigung and associate of Adolf Hitler in the Nazi Party; shot and killed in the course of the "Beer Hall Putsch" attempt to overthrow the government of Munich (b. 1884)
  - John Koren, 62, American clergyman and statistician, served as the U.S. International Prison Commissioner; jumped overboard from the liner Nieuw Amsterdam while the ship was sailing to New York (b. 1861)

== November 10, 1923 (Saturday) ==
- In a radio broadcast, former U.S. President Woodrow Wilson called the U.S. isolationist policy after the war "cowardly and dishonorable."
- Crown Prince Wilhelm of Germany ended his exile in the Netherlands and crossed back onto German soil. Dutch authorities had informed him that he would not be allowed to return to Holland as a refugee again. Wilhelm went straight to Hanover and visited retired Field Marshal Paul von Hindenburg.
- Erich Ludendorff was released on parole when he gave his word that he would not participate in any more revolutionary activities.
- Born:
  - Anne Shelton, English singer; as Patricia Sibley, in Dulwich, London, England (d. 1994)
  - Hachikō, Japanese Akita dog known for his nine-year loyalty to his deceased owner (d. 1935)

== November 11, 1923 (Sunday) ==
- Three days after the attempted Beer Hall Putsch, Bavarian police found Adolf Hitler hiding in the attic of the country home of his friend Ernst Hanfstaengl and arrested him on charges of high treason. Hitler, who would be incarcerated for 13 months, appointed his colleague Alfred Rosenberg to be the temporary leader of the Nazi Party.
- A World Requiem, Opus 60 of British composer John Foulds, was performed for the first time. The premiere was carried out by a group of 1,250 instrumentalists, including the Cenotaph Choir, in a concert at the Royal Albert Hall in London.
- Germany's Chancellor Gustav Stresemann said that the return of Crown Prince Wilhelm was a matter of internal policy and could not be refused.
- Born: Alfred Schreiber, German Luftwaffe fighter pilot who was the first jet pilot to claim an aerial victory in aviation history; in Neplachowitz (d. 1944)
- Died:
  - Tommy Ball, 23, English footballer for Aston Villa F.C.; shot and killed by his landlord (b. 1900)
  - Tom Butler, English footballer for Port Vale F.C.; died of tetanus from a game injury sustained on November 3 against Clapton Orient
  - Robert C. Murdoch, 62, Australian zoologist and expert on malacology, the study of mollusks (b. 1861)

== November 12, 1923 (Monday) ==
The 1922 Soviet flag

The new Soviet flag

- The new flag of the Soviet Union was adopted. Its design of a solid red field with a gold hammer, sickle and star in the upper hoist corner would be used with only a couple of minor variations until the USSR's dissolution in 1991.
- The U.S. Supreme Court upheld the right of U.S. states to ban non-U.S. citizens from owning or leasing agricultural land, in its decision in Terrace v. Thompson. The case had arisen from a challenge to California's Alien Land Law of 1913 and to a similar law in the state of Washington, both passed to discourage Japanese immigration.
- The historical drama film Under the Red Robe, starring Robert B. Mantell as Cardinal Richelieu, was released.
- The drama film Flaming Youth, starring Colleen Moore and Milton Sills, was released.
- Born:
  - Charlie Mariano, American jazz saxophonist; as Carmine Mariano, in Boston, United States (d. 2009)
  - Richard Venture, American actor; as Richard Venturella, in New York City, United States (d. 2017)

== November 13, 1923 (Tuesday) ==
- Former British Prime Ministers David Lloyd George and H. H. Asquith, opposing members with in Britain's Liberal Party, reached an agreement on a manifesto for free trade in order to present a united front for the party prior to the December 6 elections for the House of Commons.
- France agreed to allow for the appointment of an experts' committee to investigate Germany's capability to pay its reparations.
- The Argonne Cross Memorial was dedicated at Arlington National Cemetery.
- Born: Linda Christian; Mexican-born American film actress; as Blanca Rosa Henrietta Stella Welter Vorhauer, in Tampico, Mexico (d. 2011)

== November 14, 1923 (Wednesday) ==
- Germany suspended the payment of its reparations, explaining that France and Belgium had broken the Treaty of Versailles by occupying the Ruhr and that payment would not resume until they left.
- General Hans von Seeckt ordered that all Berlin cafés, halls and cabarets must freely admit the city's poor and cold in order to warm themselves. Failure to comply would mean the government would use the establishments exclusively as warming halls.
- The laws of New Zealand were formally extended to Antarctica as Governor-General John Jellicoe issued an order applying jurisdiction to the Ross Dependency.
- Died: Ernst Augustus of Hanover, 78, Crown Prince of Hanover from 1851 until the kingdom's 1866 annexation by Prussia (b. 1845). He had been the British Duke of Cumberland until he sided with Germany in World War I. Ernst, a great-grandson of Britain's King George III, had served as the head of the House of Hanover since 1878 after the death of the former King George V.

== November 15, 1923 (Thursday) ==
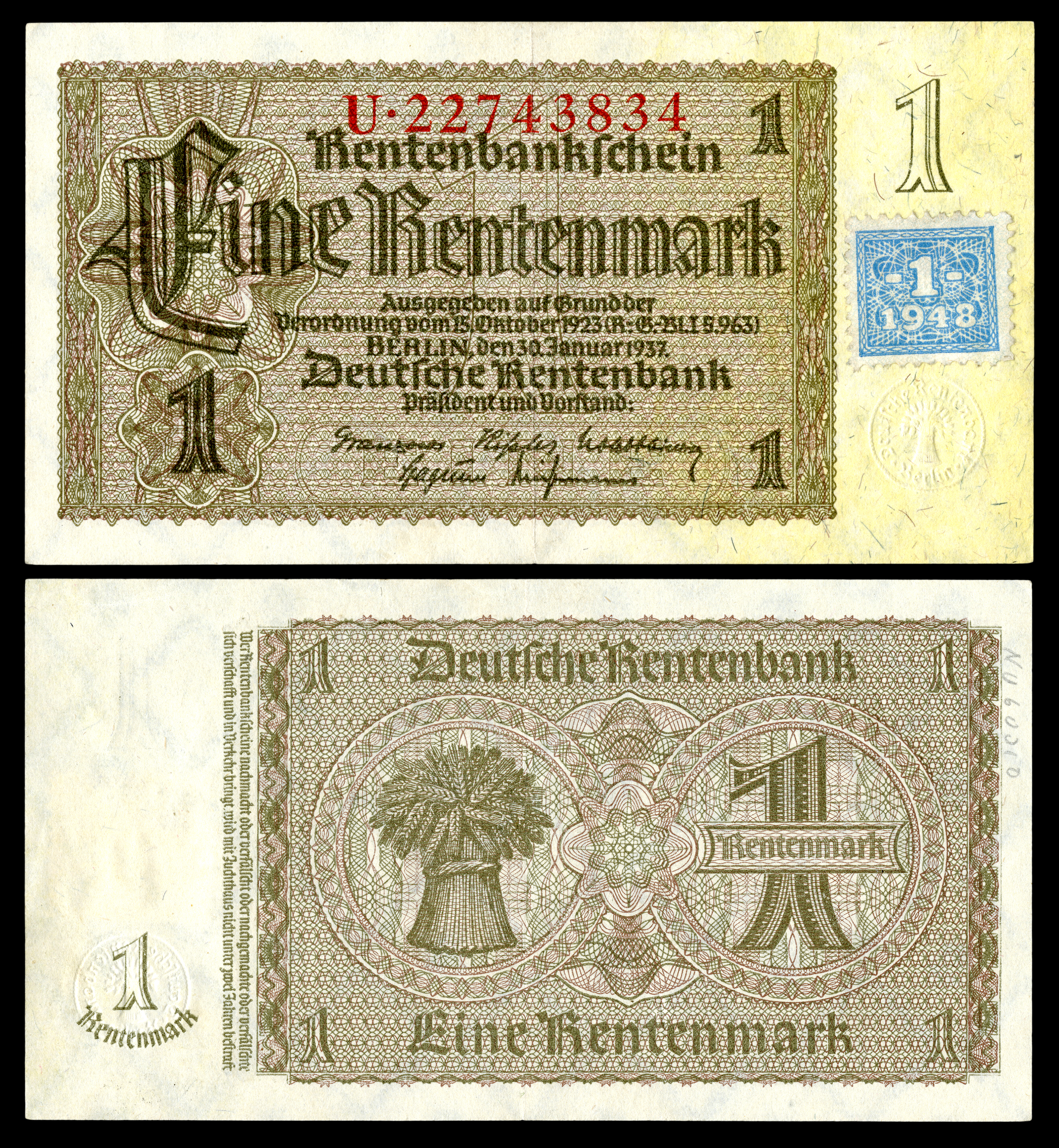
One Rentenmark

- Germany stopped printing the essentially worthless "papiermark", which had been trading at the rate of 4,200,000,000,000 (4.2 trillion) marks to one U.S. dollar by mid-November and issued the new Rentenmark, backed by the value of semi-annual property taxes and tied to the U.S. dollar with a 4.2 RM to US$1. The old marks were exchangeable at the rate of one new mark for every one trillion old marks.
- California U.S. Senator Hiram Johnson announced that he would challenge President Calvin Coolidge for the 1924 Republican nomination for U.S. president. Johnson, unlike Coolidge, was staunchly opposed to U.S. entry into the World Court.
- The Soviet Union's Presidium approved the creation of OGPU (Obyedinyonnoye Gosudarstvennoye Politicheskoye Upravleniye or Joint State Political Directorate), taking direct control of the Soviet domestic and foreign intelligence services from the NKVD and its GPU agency.
- Wealthy arms manufacturer Gustav Krupp von Bohlen und Halbach, incarcerated by France during the occupation of the Ruhr, was released from prison after seven months confinement.
- The first census of Albania was taken, limited to a numerical count without individual household details, was taken and showed that the Balkan kingdom had 814,380 residents, almost 52 percent of whom (421,618) were male.
- Died:
  - Mohammad Yaqub Khan, 73–74, Emir of Afghanistan in 1879, known for surrendering the kingdom to the United Kingdom to end the Second Anglo-Afghan War (b. 1849)
  - George Neilson, 64, Scottish historian (b. 1858)

== November 16, 1923 (Friday) ==
- The British House of Commons was dissolved by King George V as Prime Minister Stanley Baldwin called a snap election to be held on December 6, explaining he wanted a mandate before implementing a new protectionist tariff policy.
- A Swiss jury acquitted Maurice Conradi on charges arising from the assassination of Vatslav Vorovsky. The verdict angered the Soviet Union.
- Benito Mussolini said in a Senate speech that "The Italian government cannot give its approval to any further occupation of German territory. One must have the courage to say that the German people cannot be destroyed. They are a people which has known civilization and which may tomorrow be an integral part of European civilization."
- Born: Kantha Rao, Indian film actor in more than 400 films, and producer; as Tadepalli Lakshmi Kantha Rao, in Kodad, princely state of Hyderabad, British India (present-day Telangana state, India) (d. 2009)

== November 17, 1923 (Saturday) ==
- At least 17 crew were killed after the German steamer Kronos struck a sea mine off of the coast of the Estonian island of Saaremaa while sailing from Stettin to Saint Petersburg.
- Zev was awarded a controversial win over In Memoriam in a $30,000 horse race at Churchill Downs. Photographs and newsreel footage of the extremely close finish suggest that In Memoriam actually won by a nose.
- France's Compagnie générale transsaharienne (CGT), charged with determining the best routes for travel across the Sahara desert in North Africa, began its first expedition, traveling from Adrar in French Algeria, to Tessalit in the French Sudan (in what is now Mali, a distance of 550 miles (890 km). Led by Lieutenant Georges Estienne for the French Foreign Legion, the group of 11 reached its destination on November 30.
- Born:
  - Aristides Pereira, Cape Verdean politician, served as the first President of Cape Verde from 1975 to 1991; in Boa Vista, Portuguese Cape Verde (present-day Cape Verde) (d. 2011)
  - Mike Garcia, American baseball pitcher and ERA leader in the American League in 1949 and 1954; as Edward Miguel Garcia, in San Gabriel, California, United States (d. 1986)
  - Franz Kurowski, German author of histories and novels about World War II; in Hombruch, Dortmund, Germany (d. 2011)
  - Margareta Sjöstedt, Swedish-born Austrian opera contralto; in Stockholm, Sweden (d. 2012)
- Died: Lewis H. Nash, 70–71, American engineer and inventor of the liquid-ring-vacuum pump (b. c. 1852)

== November 18, 1923 (Sunday) ==
- Elections were held in the Kingdom of Bulgaria for the 247 seats of the unicameral parliament, the Narodnо Sabranie. The new Demokraticheski Sgovor Party ("Democratic Alliance"), founded after the June 9 overthrow of the government and led by Prime Minister Aleksandar Tsankov, won 200 seats and the Bulgarian Agrarian National Union was second with 19 seats.
- The Parliament of Italy passed the Acerbo Law, automatically giving the first-place party in an election a two-thirds majority of seats as long as it received at least 25 percent of the vote. The remaining one-third of seats were to be shared among the other parties proportionally.
- All 14 of the crew of the American schooner Grace N. Pendleton were killed when the ship broke up in a gale in the North Sea after departing Hamburg. Rescue boats were unable to reach crewmembers whom they saw clinging to the remains of the ship.
- Born:
  - Alan Shepard, the first American astronaut; in Derry, New Hampshire, United States (d. 1998)
  - Ong Poh Lim, Malayan badminton star; in Kuching, Sarawak, British Malaya (present-day Malaysia) (d. 2003)

== November 19, 1923 (Monday) ==
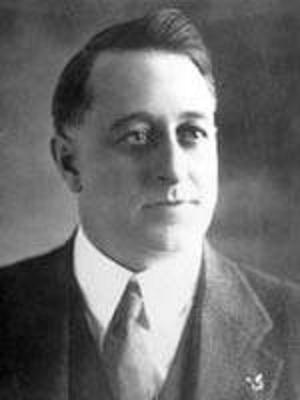
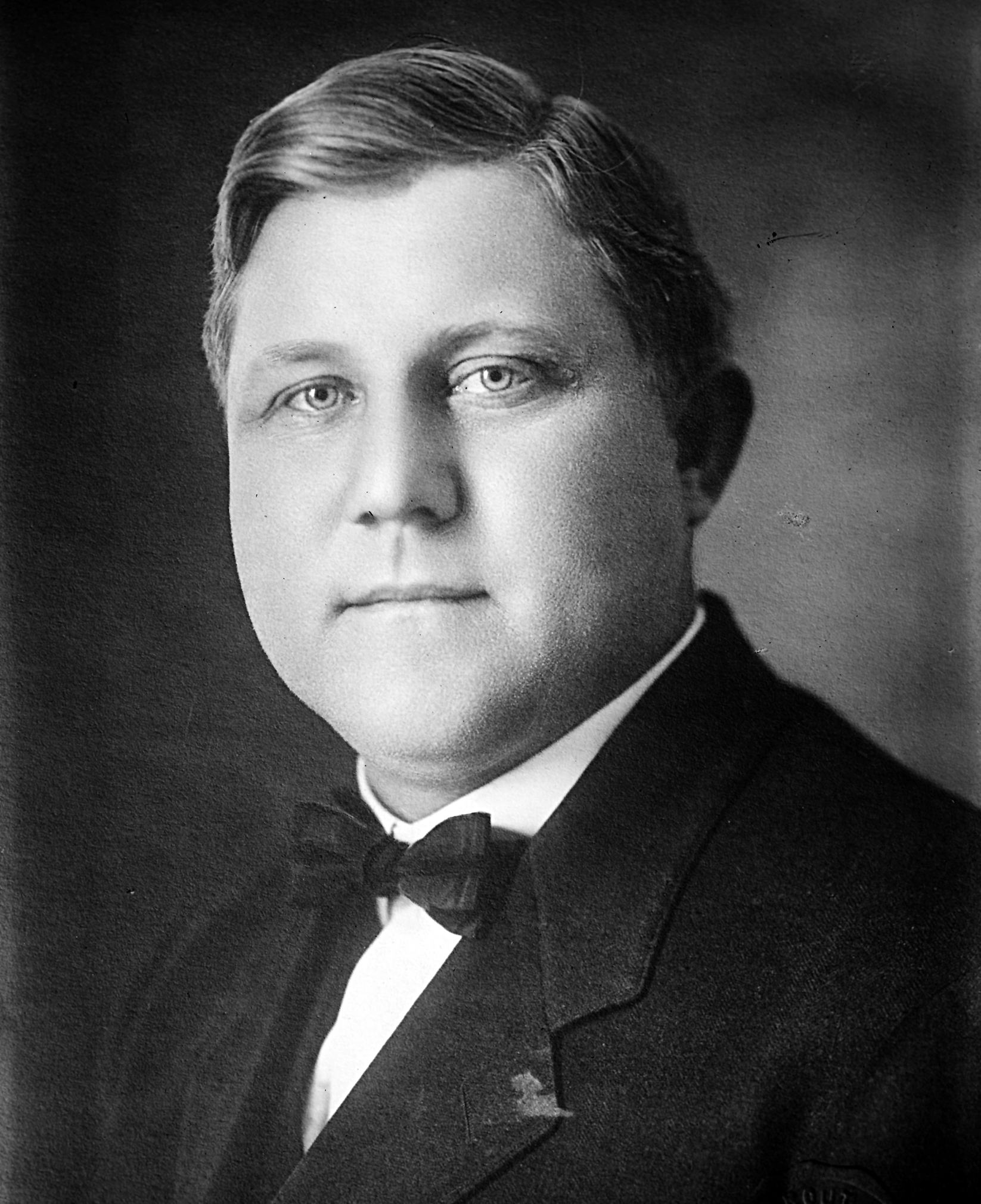
Oklahoma's Governor Walton convicted, succeeded by Trapp
- In the U.S., Oklahoma Governor Jack C. Walton was convicted by the state senate on eleven charges of corruption and abuse of power and removed from office. Martin E. Trapp, who had been acting governor while the trial had been conducted, was sworn in to fill the remainder of Walton's term.
- Born:
  - František Sláma, Czech cellist, in Herálec, Czechoslovakia (present-day Czech Republic) (d. 2004)
  - Jane Trahey, American businesswoman and advertising executive; in Chicago, United States (d. 2000)
- Died: John Wesley Gilbert, 60, African American archaeologist and Methodist missionary; died after a long illness (b. 1863)

== November 20, 1923 (Tuesday) ==
- The German mark was pegged to the Rentenmark at a trillion to one, solving the hyperinflation crisis and returning Germany to the gold standard.
- U.S. patent no. 1,475,024 was granted to African-American inventor Garrett Morgan for the first three-position traffic light (with a red-amber-green signal for stop, caution and go respectively) still in use a century later. Morgan had applied for the patent on February 27, 1922.
- Born:
  - Nadine Gordimer, South African writer and 1991 Nobel Prize laureate; in Springs, Transvaal Province, Union of South Africa (present-day South Africa) (d. 2014)
  - Claude Lebey, French food critic who published the annual Guide Lebey of restaurants and bistros in Paris; in Fontenay-le-Comte, Vendée département, France (d. 2017)
- Died:
  - Rudolf Havenstein, 66, German lawyer and president of the Reichsbank (b. 1857)
  - Denny Barry, 40, Irish Republican and inmate at the Curragh Camp prison; died on the 35th day of a hunger strike (b. 1883)

== November 21, 1923 (Wednesday) ==
- Three weeks after having been removed from office by German Chancellor Gustav Stresemann as premier of Germany's Free State of Saxony, Erich Zeigner was arrested on charges of corruption while in office.
- Frank Goddard defeated Jack Bloomfield at the Royal Albert Hall to reclaim the vacant British heavyweight boxing title.
- Born: Big John Greer, American blues saxophonist and singer; in Hot Springs, Arkansas, United States (d. 1972)

== November 22, 1923 (Thursday) ==
- Stage performer Mabelle Corey was granted a divorce from industrialist William Ellis Corey in a Paris court.
- Born:
  - Arthur Hiller, Canadian television and film director known for Love Story (1970), Silver Streak (1976) and Outrageous Fortune (1987); in Edmonton, Canada (d. 2016)
  - Hanna Maron, German-born Israeli actress and comedian who had the longest career in acting, working for 87 years between 1927 and 2014; as Hanna Meierzak, in Berlin, Germany (d. 2014)
  - Victor Papanek, Austrian-born American designer, author of the influential Design for the Real World; in Vienna, Austria (d. 1998)
- Died: Andy O'Sullivan, Irish Republican Army intelligence officer, became the third, and last prisoner to die after participating in the hunger strikes in Irish prisons. O'Sullivan's death at Mountjoy Prison, after 40 days of not eating, followed those of Joseph Whitty at Mountjoy on September 2 and Denny Barry on November 21 at Curragh Camp. The strike was called off the next day and the 22 survivors received medical attention.

== November 23, 1923 (Friday) ==
- The 1923 Irish hunger strikes end. Thousands of Irish republicans took part in prisons across Ireland, five prisoners died in the hunger strikes.
- Regular radio broadcasting began in Australia as the station 2SB launched its services at 8:00 in the evening in Sydney. The station, now with the call letters 2BL, is now branded as ABC Radio Sydney and is the flagship station of the Australian Broadcasting Corporation's radio network.
- Gustav Stresemann resigned as German Chancellor after losing a vote of confidence, 230 to 155.
- The Communist Party of Germany was banned following the Hamburg Uprising, along with the National Socialist Party and the Nationalist Party.
- Born:
  - Krzysztof Boruń, Polish physicist and science fiction author; in Częstochowa, Poland (d. 2000)
  - Peter Elias, U.S. pioneer in information theory who introduced the convolutional code and the binary erasure channel; in New Brunswick, New Jersey, United States (d. 2001)
  - Billy Haughton, American harness racing driver and horse trainer, known for winning the Hambletonian Stakes four times; as William Haughton, in Gloversville, New York, United States (d. 1986)
  - Robert Zajonc, Polish social psychologist; in Łódź, Poland (d. 2008)
  - Julien J. LeBourgeois, U.S. Navy Vice Admiral, served as the President of the Naval War College from 1974 to 1977; in Southern Pines, North Carolina, United States (d. 2012)
- Died:
  - Urmuz, 40, Romanian avant-garde author; committed suicide by shooting himself (b. 1883)
  - Oscar Marx, 57, American politician, served as the Mayor of Detroit from 1913 to 1918; died after an illness of several months (b. 1866)

== November 24, 1923 (Saturday) ==
- Foreign ministers of the kingdoms of Romania and Yugoslavia reached an agreement in Belgrade for an exchange of territories, with Romania ceding Pardanj, Modoš, Šurjan, Crivobara and Veliki Gaj to the Serbian SR in Yugoslavia, and Yugoslavia ceding Cherestur, Beba Veche, Ciorda, Iam and Jimbolia to Romania.
- The 1923 college football season came to an end in the United States as two teams from the Big Nine Conference (now the Big Ten) both finishing unbeaten, untied, and later to be recognized retroactively by the NCAA as national champions. The Fighting Illini of the University of Illinois, with star halfback Red Grange, defeated Ohio State University, 9 to 0, at Columbus, Ohio to finish with a record of 8–0–0. The Wolverines of the University of Michigan, who had beaten Ohio State 23–0 earlier in the season, beat Minnesota at home, 10 to 0 to finish 8–0–0 as well. Michigan and Illinois, despite being in the same conference, had not been scheduled to play each other. Illinois would later be recognized retroactively (in 1943) by the Helms Athletic Foundation as the best team of 1923, while the National Championship Foundation would select Illinois and Michigan together in 1980.
- The Army–Navy Game ended in a 0–0 tie before 66,000 fans came out to watch the game which was played under muddy conditions at the Polo Grounds in New York City.
- The new Governor of Oklahoma, Martin E. Trapp, came out in support of an act regulating secret organizations such as the Ku Klux Klan.
- Born: Anthony Carollo, American mobster and head of the New Orleans crime family from 1990 until his death; in New Orleans, United States (d. 2007)

== November 25, 1923 (Sunday) ==
- German President Friedrich Ebert asked Heinrich Albert to become chancellor and form a cabinet. Nationalist members of the Reichstag responded by announcing that they would not approve him as Chancellor.
- The first, and only NFL game in which a team finished with exactly four points was played, as the Racine Legion of Racine, Wisconsin) defeated the Chicago Cardinals, 10 to 4. The Cardinals' scoring came on two safeties, and they had a 2 to 0 lead at half time.
- Born: Mauno Koivisto, Finnish politician, served as the President of Finland from 1982 to 1994, and as Prime Minister from 1968 to 1970 and 1979 to 1982; in Turku, Finland (d. 2017)

== November 26, 1923 (Monday) ==
- The comedy play Meet the Wife, starring Mary Boland, opened on Broadway.
- Born:
  - Pat Phoenix, English actress and sex symbol known for being in the original cast of Coronation Street; as Patricia Manfield, in Fallowfield, Lancashire, England (d. 1986)
  - V. K. Murthy, Indian cinematographer; as Venkatarama Pandit Krishnamurthy, in Mysore, Kingdom of Mysore, British India (present-day Karnataka, India) (d. 2014)
  - Tom Hughes, Australian barrister and politician, served as the Attorney-General of Australia from 1969 to 1971; in Rose Bay, New South Wales, Australia (d. 2024)

== November 27, 1923 (Tuesday) ==
- George H. Greenhalgh filed the patent application for the first automotive oil filter. Greehalgh said in his application, "This invention relates to filters and particularly to filters adapted to be used for removing deleterious matter from oil or other liquids, as for example from lubricants in the lubricating systems of internal combustion engines or other devices." Ernest J. Sweetland, the patent assignee, would market the device as the Purolator (a trademark based on the phrase pure oil later), d. U.S. patent No. 1,721,250 would be awarded on July 16, 1929.
- In the Madras Presidency, a province of British India that had been granted limited self-rule by the imperial government in 1920, opposition leader C. R. Reddy introduced a motion of no confidence in an attempt to dislodge Chief Minister Panaganti Ramarayaningar, whose Justice Party had won the November 10 elections for the 98-member Madras Legislative Council. The motion failed, with only 44 in favor and 65 against.
- Friedrich Ebert turned to Adam Stegerwald to become chancellor after Heinrich Albert was unable to form a government.
- Born:
  - Antonie Hegerlíková, Czech stage, film and television actress whose career spanned more than 60 years from 1943 to 2004; in Bratislava, Czechoslovakia (present-day Slovakia) (d. 2012)
  - Duilio Marzio, Argentine stage and film actor; as Duilio Bruno Perruccio La Stell, in Buenos Aires, Argentine (d. 2013)
  - J. Ernest Wilkins, Jr., African American child prodigy and nuclear scientist; in Chicago, United States (d. 2011)

== November 28, 1923 (Wednesday) ==
- The Rhine Republic came to an end as Josef Friedrich Matthes announced that he had dissolved the separatist government that had first been proclaimed in the occupied Rhineland on October 21.
- The Andhra Bank began operations after being founded by Bhogaraju Pattabhi Sitaramayya and the Raja Yarlagadda Sivarama Prasad. It was one of the largest Indian-owned banks in India until it was acquired by the Union Bank of India in 2020. The original location was in Machilipatnam in the Madras Presidency (now the state of Andhra Pradesh).
- Adam Stegerwald notified President Ebert that he was unable to form a cabinet.
- The David Belasco and Tom Cushing stage production Laugh, Clown, Laugh! opened at the Belasco Theatre on Broadway, starring Lionel Barrymore and Irene Fenwick.
- Born: General Sosthène Fernandez, Cambodian officer and politician, served as the Commander-in-Chief of the Khmer National Armed Forces from 1970 to 1975; in Phnom Penh, French protectorate of Cambodia, French Indochina (present-day Cambodia) (d. 2006)

== November 29, 1923 (Thursday) ==
- Wilhelm Marx accepted an offer from President Ebert to form a cabinet.
- The German comedy film The Little Napoleon was released. Marlene Dietrich made her film debut in a small role.
- Born: Frank Reynolds, American TV journalist, anchorman for ABC Evening News and later for ABC World News Tonight; in East Chicago, Indiana, United States (d. 1983)

== November 30, 1923 (Friday) ==
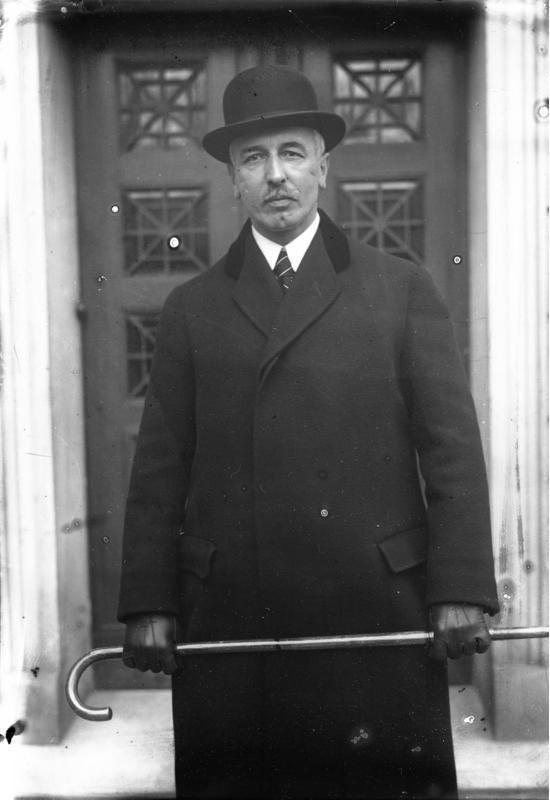
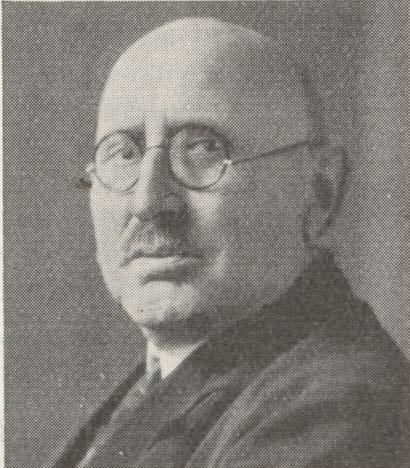
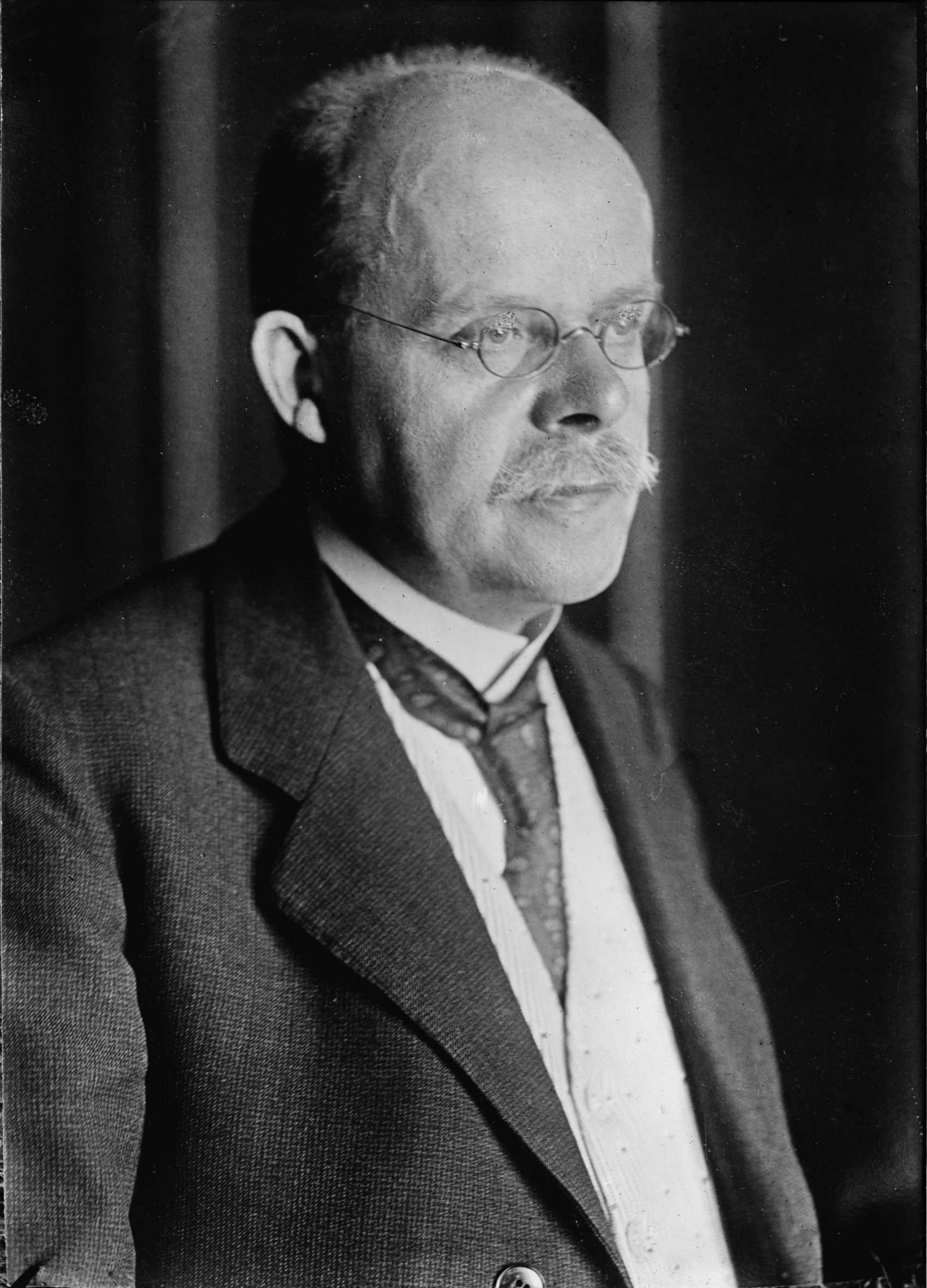
Chancellor picks Albert, Stegerwald and Marx
- Wilhelm Marx became the new Chancellor of Germany after neither Heinrich Albert or Adam Stegerwald were able to form a government.
- Warren T. McCray, Governor of the U.S. state of Indiana, was indicted on 192 charges of corruption by a grand jury in Indianapolis.
- Two committees were established to examine Germany's capability to pay reparations.
- Died:
  - Martha Mansfield, 24, American stage and silent film actress; died one day after suffering third-degree burns after her costume caught fire (b. 1899).
  - John Maclean, 44, Scottish nationalist and socialist; collapsed while giving a speech outdoors in Glasgow and died of pneumonia (b. 1879)
  - Robert Reid, 1st Earl Loreburn, 77, British lawyer, judge and politician, served as Lord Chancellor of the United Kingdom from 1905 to 1912 (b. 1846)
