= S. Rajeshkumar =

Indian politician

Minister for Tourism Government of Tamil Nadu
- Incumbent
- Assumed office 21 May 2026
- Governor: Rajendra Arlekar
- Chief Minister: C. Joseph Vijay
- Ministry and Departments: Tourism Department
- Preceded by: R. Rajendran

Leader of Congress Legislative Party Tamil Nadu Legislative Assembly
- In office 18 February 2024 – 13 August 2026
- Preceded by: K. Selvaperunthagai
- Succeeded by: Tharahai Cuthbert

Member of Tamil Nadu Legislative Assembly
- Incumbent
- Assumed office 25 May 2016
- Preceded by: S. John Jacob
- Constituency: Killiyoor

Personal details
- Born: January 19, 1975 (age 51) Thiruvarambu, Kanyakumari district, Tamil Nadu, India
- Party: Indian National Congress
- Relations: R. Ponnappan (grand-uncle); Pon. Vijayaraghavan (first cousin once removed)
- Profession: Politician

S. Rajeshkumar is an Indian politician from Tamil Nadu and a member of the Tamil Nadu Legislative Assembly in India. He represents the Killiyoor, which is in Kanyakumaridistrict, Tamil Nadu. He did his schooling at LMS School, Palliyadi.

== Electoral Performance ==
Election	Party	Constituency	Result	Vote	%	Margin
2016 Tamil Nadu Assembly election	INC	Killiyoor	Won	77,356	50.47 %	51,494
2021 Tamil Nadu Assembly election	INC	Killiyoor	Won	1,01,541	59.76 %	55,400
2026 Tamil Nadu Assembly election	INC	Killiyoor	Won	66,434	37.42 %	1,311
