= D. Kumaradas =

Indian politician (died 2019)

D. Kumaradas (died June 27, 2019) was an Indian politician. He was elected to the Tamil Nadu Legislative Assembly on four occasions from Killiyur constituency: in 1984 as a Janata Party candidate, 1991 as a Janata Dal candidate, and in 1996 and 2001 as a Tamil Maanila Congress (Moopanar) (TMC) candidate. He floated a new party, called the Tamil Maanila Kamarajar Congress, in December 2002.

G. K. Vasan revived the TMC in November 2014. On 19 April 2016, the party named 26 candidates to contest the 2016 state assembly elections as part of an alliance with the People's Welfare Front and Desiya Murpokku Dravida Kazhagam. The list included S. John Jacob, the incumbent Killiyur MLA, but one week later it was announced that Kumaradas would contest the seat in his place. The constituency was won by the INC candidate, S. Rajeshkumar.
