= Killiyoor Assembly constituency =

Constituency of Tamil Nadu

Coordinates: 8.27°N 77.21°E

Killiyoor
- Constituency No. 234 for the Tamil Nadu Legislative Assembly

Constituency details
- Country: India
- Region: South India
- State: Tamil Nadu
- District: Kanniyakumari
- Lok Sabha constituency: Kanniyakumari
- Established: 1951
- Total electors: 247,289
- Reservation: None

Member of Legislative Assembly
- 17th Tamil Nadu Legislative Assembly
- Incumbent S. Rajeshkumar
- Party: INC
- Alliance: TVK+
- Elected year: 2026

Killiyur is an assembly constituency located in Kanniyakumari Lok Sabha constituency in Kanyakumari district in Tamil Nadu. It is one of the 234 State Legislative Assembly Constituencies in Tamil Nadu.

== Members of Legislative Assembly ==
Year	Member	Political party
Travancore-Cochin
1952	R. Ponnappan Nadar	Travancore Tamil Nadu Congress
1954	R. Ponnappan Nadar	Travancore Tamil Nadu Congress
Madras State
1957	A. Nesamony	Indian National Congress
1962	R. Ponnappan Nadar	Indian National Congress
1967	William	Indian National Congress
Tamil Nadu
1971	N. Dennis	Indian National Congress
1977	P. Vijayaraghavan	Janata Party
1980	P. Vijayaraghavan	Janata Party
1984	D. Kumaradas	Janata Party
1989	P. Vijayaraghavan	Independent
1991	D. Kumaradas	Janata Dal
1996	D. Kumaradas	Tamil Maanila Congress
2001	D. Kumaradas	Tamil Maanila Congress
2006	S. John Jacob	Indian National Congress
2011	S. John Jacob	Indian National Congress
2016	S. Rajeshkumar	Indian National Congress
2021	S. Rajeshkumar	Indian National Congress
2026	S. Rajeshkumar	Indian National Congress

== Election results ==
Vote share of winning candidates
2026	37.42%
2021	59.76%
2016	50.47%
2011	41.69%
2006	55.18%
2001	49.16%
1996	41.24%
1991	34.25%
1989	39.53%
1984	58.24%
1980	54.28%
1977	79.20%
1971	62.25%
1967	42.40%
1962	60.05%

=== 2026 ===
2026 Tamil Nadu Legislative Assembly election: Killiyoor
Party	Candidate	Votes	%	±%
INC	S. Rajeshkumar	66,434	37.42	▼22.34
TVK	S.Sabin	65,123	36.68	New
TMC(M) (BJP)	Nivin Simon. J	31,070	17.5	
NOTA	None of the above	502	0.28	▼0.16
Margin of victory		1,311	0.74	▼31.86
Turnout		1,77,534	71.79	▲5.25
Registered electors		2,47,289		
INC hold		Swing	▼22.34	

=== 2021 ===
2021 Tamil Nadu Legislative Assembly election: Killiyoor
Party	Candidate	Votes	%	±%
INC	S. Rajeshkumar	101,541	59.76	
AIADMK	Jude Dev K. V.	46,141	27.15	
NOTA	None of the above	754	0.44	
Margin of victory		55,400	32.60	+2.40
Turnout		1,69,918	66.54	+5.88
INC hold		Swing	9.29	

=== 2016 ===
2016 Tamil Nadu Legislative Assembly election: Killiyoor
Party	Candidate	Votes	%	±%
INC	S. Rajeshkumar	77,356	50.47	
BJP	Pon. Vijayaraghavan	31,061	20.27	
AIADMK	Mary Kamalabai A.	25,862	16.87	
TMC(M)	D. Kumaradas	13,704	8.94	
NOTA	None Of The Above	1,142	0.75	
Margin of victory		46,295	30.20	+12.27
Turnout		1,53,273	60.66	−3.24
Registered electors		2,52,676		
INC hold		Swing	8.77	

=== 2011 ===
2011 Tamil Nadu Legislative Assembly election: Killiyoor
Party	Candidate	Votes	%	±%
INC	S. John Jacob	56,932	41.69	
BJP	Chandra Kumar. T	32,446	23.76	
AIADMK	George. R	29,920	21.91	
Independent	D. Kumaradas	10,238	7.50	
Independent	Jose Bilbin. J	3,457	2.53	
Independent	Soosai Marian. M	1,123	0.82	
Independent	Thankamony. C	569	0.42	
Loktantrik Samajwadi	Babu. P	533	0.39	
Independent	Paul Raj. C. M	476	0.35	
BSP	Dhayalan. G. S	468	0.34	
Independent	Satheesh. C	382	0.28	
Margin of victory		24,486	17.93	−10.84
Turnout		136,544	63.90	4.15
Registered electors		213,668		
INC hold		Swing	-13.48	

=== 2006 ===
2006 Tamil Nadu Legislative Assembly election: Killiyoor
Party	Candidate	Votes	%	±%
INC	S. John Jacob	51,016	55.18	
BJP	Chandra Kumar. T	24,411	26.40	
AIADMK	D. Kumaradas	14,056	15.20	
DMDK	Richmohanraj. A	1,743	1.89	
Independent	Stanley Gipiraj. T	492	0.53	
Independent	Rehu Anandharaj. A	316	0.34	
Independent	Justin Felix. A	236	0.26	
Independent	Suresh. C	185	0.20	
Margin of victory		26,605	28.78	11.90
Turnout		92,455	59.75	8.68
Registered electors		154,732		
INC gain from TMC(M)		Swing	6.02	

=== 2001 ===
2001 Tamil Nadu Legislative Assembly election: Killiyoor
Party	Candidate	Votes	%	±%
TMC(M)	D. Kumaradas	40,075	49.16	
BJP	Santhakumar C	26,315	32.28	
JD(S)	Mano Thangaraj	13,259	16.26	
Independent	S. Johnson	1,095	1.34	
Independent	C. Kumaraswamy	419	0.51	
Independent	G. Dennis Raj	362	0.44	
Margin of victory		13,760	16.88	3.95
Turnout		81,525	51.07	−7.84
Registered electors		159,720		
TMC(M) hold		Swing	7.92	

=== 1996 ===
1996 Tamil Nadu Legislative Assembly election: Killiyoor
Party	Candidate	Votes	%	±%
TMC(M)	D. Kumaradas	33,227	41.24	
BJP	C. Santhakumar	22,810	28.31	
JD	Mano Thangaraj	17,844	22.15	
INC	A. Selvaraj	6,267	7.78	
Independent	A. Chellam	115	0.14	
Independent	M. Sesaiyan	72	0.09	
Independent	R. Thomson	72	0.09	
Independent	S. Johnson	65	0.08	
Independent	J. Mariaarputham	51	0.06	
Independent	M. Balachandran Thambi	19	0.02	
Independent	S. Ponnuswamy	18	0.02	
Margin of victory		10,417	12.93	11.44
Turnout		80,576	58.91	1.35
Registered electors		140,862		
TMC(M) gain from JD		Swing	6.98	

=== 1991 ===
1991 Tamil Nadu Legislative Assembly election: Killiyoor
Party	Candidate	Votes	%	±%
JD	D. Kumaradas	26,818	34.25	
INC	Robert Singh Pon.	25,650	32.76	
BJP	Mohanakumar C.	13,735	17.54	
JP	Vijayaraghavan Pon.	11,421	14.59	
THMM	Chirstoper John T.	129	0.16	
Independent	Johnson S.	124	0.16	
Independent	Thankiah A.	100	0.13	
Independent	Sundararaj R.	88	0.11	
Independent	Samarthan G.	78	0.10	
Independent	Jayapaul V.	64	0.08	
Independent	Chellathurai C.	63	0.08	
Margin of victory		1,168	1.49	−11.41
Turnout		78,295	57.56	−5.61
Registered electors		140,026		
JD gain from Independent		Swing	-5.27	

=== 1989 ===
1989 Tamil Nadu Legislative Assembly election: Killiyoor
Party	Candidate	Votes	%	±%
Independent	P. Vijayaraghavan	30,127	39.53	
DMK	Jeyaraj. A. M	20,296	26.63	
INC	Stanislaus. P. S. M	16,982	22.28	
BJP	Somaraj. T. M	7,307	9.59	
AIADMK	Selvaraj. P. M	486	0.64	
Independent	Karnan. M. M	293	0.38	
Independent	Kumar. M. P. M	201	0.26	
Independent	Ponnian. C. M	169	0.22	
Independent	Rajendran. T. M	93	0.12	
Independent	Selvaraj. S. M	81	0.11	
Independent	Mohamed Basheer	76	0.10	
Margin of victory		9,831	12.90	−5.21
Turnout		76,222	63.17	1.15
Registered electors		121,736		
Independent gain from JP		Swing	-18.72	

=== 1984 ===
1984 Tamil Nadu Legislative Assembly election: Killiyoor
Party	Candidate	Votes	%	±%
JP	D. Kumaradas	36,944	58.24	
INC	Pauliah. A.	25,458	40.14	
Independent	Raajretnam. T.	448	0.71	
Independent	Thankian. A.	419	0.66	
Independent	Stanislaus. P. S.	161	0.25	
Margin of victory		11,486	18.11	−7.43
Turnout		63,430	62.03	1.84
Registered electors		105,740		
JP hold		Swing	3.97	

=== 1980 ===
1980 Tamil Nadu Legislative Assembly election: Killiyoor
Party	Candidate	Votes	%	±%
JP	P. Vijayaraghavan	31,521	54.28	
DMK	Russel Raj C.	16,691	28.74	
AIADMK	Radhakrishnan R. S.	9,861	16.98	
Margin of victory		14,830	25.54	−34.44
Turnout		58,073	60.18	14.76
Registered electors		97,360		
JP hold		Swing	-24.92	

=== 1977 ===
1977 Tamil Nadu Legislative Assembly election: Killiyoor
Party	Candidate	Votes	%	±%
JP	P. Vijayaraghavan	34,237	79.20	
INC	K. Thankaraj	8,309	19.22	
Independent	T. John Isac	683	1.58	
Margin of victory		25,928	59.98	34.71
Turnout		43,229	45.43	−21.14
Registered electors		95,659		
JP gain from INC		Swing	16.95	

=== 1971 ===
1971 Tamil Nadu Legislative Assembly election: Killiyoor
Party	Candidate	Votes	%	±%
INC	N. Dennis	34,573	62.25	
DMK	Russel Raj. C	20,541	36.99	
Independent	Jacinth Mendez S.	422	0.76	
Margin of victory		14,032	25.27	14.07
Turnout		55,536	66.56	−4.59
Registered electors		85,361		
INC hold		Swing	19.86	

=== 1967 ===
1967 Madras Legislative Assembly election: Killiyoor
Party	Candidate	Votes	%	±%
INC	William	21,423	42.40	
SWA	Paniadimai	15,767	31.20	
Independent	Russel Raj. C	11,887	23.53	
Independent	A. Gabriel	1,451	2.87	
Margin of victory		5,656	11.19	−25.40
Turnout		50,528	71.16	15.06
Registered electors		73,403		
INC hold		Swing	-17.65	

=== 1962 ===
1962 Madras Legislative Assembly election: Killiyoor
Party	Candidate	Votes	%	±%
INC	R. Ponnappan Nadar	25,278	60.05	
Independent	G. Devadas	9,872	23.45	
Independent	A. Gabriel	4,271	10.15	
Independent	V. Abraham	2,676	6.36	
Margin of victory		15,406	36.60	
Turnout		42,097	56.09	56.09
Registered electors		78,086		
INC hold		Swing		

=== 1957 ===
1957 Madras Legislative Assembly election: Killiyoor
Party	Candidate	Votes	%	±%
INC	A. Nesamony	Unopposed		
Registered electors		66,513		
INC gain from TTNC		Swing		

=== 1954 ===
1954 Travancore-Cochin Legislative Assembly election: Killiyoor
Party	Candidate	Votes	%	±%
TTNC	Ponnappan Nadar	17,113	85.61	
INC	Gabrial	2,877	14.39	
Margin of victory		14,236	71.22	14.91
Turnout		19,990	55.16	−11.26
Registered electors		36,237		
TTNC hold		Swing		

=== 1952 ===
1952 Travancore-Cochin Legislative Assembly election: Killiyur
Party	Candidate	Votes	%	±%
TTNC	R. Ponnappan Nadar	17,084	66.96	
INC	A. Gabrial	2,718	10.65	
TTP	A . Challia Nadar	1,871	7.33	
Tamil Nadu People Front	P. Samuel	1,783	6.99	
Socialist	S. Challiah	1,035	4.06	
Independent	P. Maria Arul	1,021	4.00	
Margin of victory		14,366	56.31	
Turnout		25,512	66.42	
Registered electors		38,410		
TTNC win (new seat)				
