= Indian Airlines Flight 171 =

1976 aviation accident

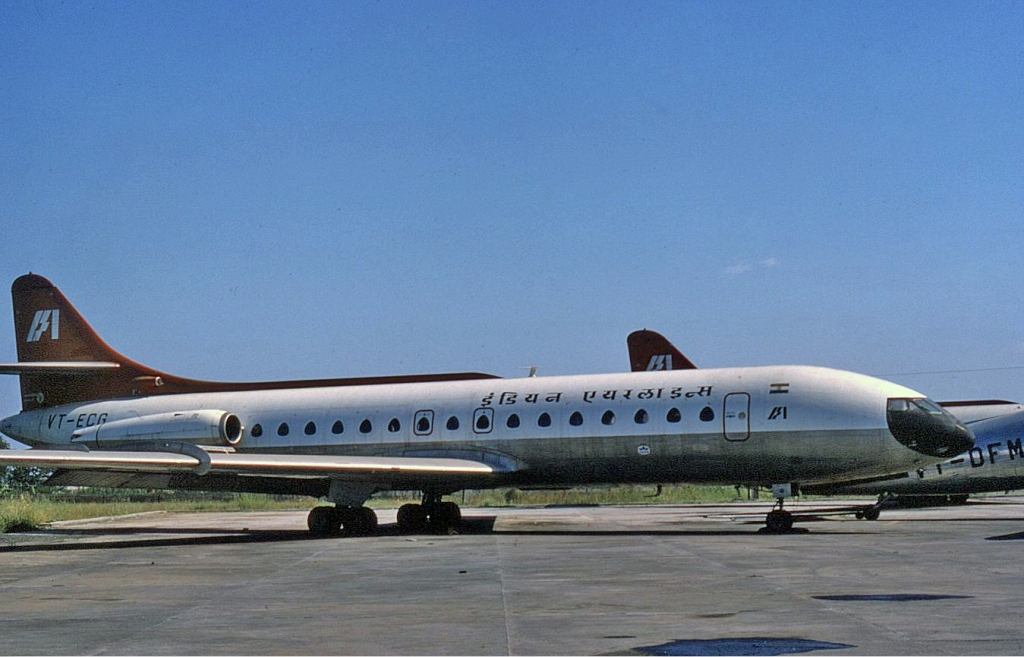
- An Indian Airlines Caravelle, similar to the accident aircraft

Accident
- Date: 12 October 1976
- Summary: In-flight fire due to an uncontained engine failure
- Site: Bombay-Santacruz Airport, Bombay, India

Aircraft
- Aircraft type: Sud Aviation Caravelle
- Operator: Indian Airlines
- IATA flight No.: IC171
- ICAO flight No.: IAC171
- Call sign: INDAIR 171
- Registration: VT-DWN
- Flight origin: Bombay-Santacruz Airport (now Chhatrapati Shivaji Maharaj International Airport)
- Destination: Madras Airport (now Chennai International Airport)
- Occupants: 95
- Passengers: 89
- Crew: 6
- Fatalities: 95
- Survivors: 0

Indian Airlines Flight 171 was a scheduled domestic passenger flight from Bombay-Santacruz Airport to Madras Airport. On 12 October 1976, the Sud Aviation Caravelle operating the flight suffered an uncontained engine failure. As a result, the plane returned to Bombay-Santacruz Airport and attempted an unsuccessful emergency landing; the resulting crash killed all 95 on board the flight.

The incident was caused by a weardown of an engine component; metal fatigue in the number 2 engine's 10th stage high-pressure compressor disc had caused it to disintegrate. The resulting fragments severed fuel lines, causing fuel to leak into the engine and ignite, producing an uncontrolled fire that eventually affected control surfaces, leading to a loss of control.

== Accident ==
Flight 171 was a scheduled domestic passenger flight from Bombay (now Mumbai) to Madras (now Chennai). A Boeing aircraft was originally supposed to make the flight but it developed engine trouble and was replaced with a Sud Aviation Caravelle. Shortly after takeoff from runway 27, Flight 171 suffered a failure of its number 2 engine. The crew of Flight 171 immediately turned back to attempt an emergency landing on Bombay Airport's runway 09. With its undercarriage down, approximately 1,000 yards (3,000 ft; 910 m) from the end of the runway, and while at an altitude of 300 feet (91 m), the aircraft suffered a loss of control and plummeted into the ground. Everyone on board Flight 171 perished in the accident.

== Cause ==
A fatigue crack in the tenth stage compressor disc caused a power plant failure which was followed by the bursting of the compressor casing and the cutting of fuel lines that spanned the structure. This caused an intense in-flight fire in the engine bay. It is believed the fire consumed the Caravelle's supply of hydraulic fluid and this was the cause of the aircraft going out of control.

== Notable victims ==
- R. Ponnappan Nadar, a politician and lawyer from Indian National Congress (INC); former Member of Tamil Nadu Legislative Assembly, representing Vilavancode constituency.
- Rani Chandra, a Malayalam-Tamil actress and model.
- Jimmy Mehta, a tennis player who appeared in Davis Cup and Wimbledon in 1947.
