= S. Vijayadharani =

Indian politician

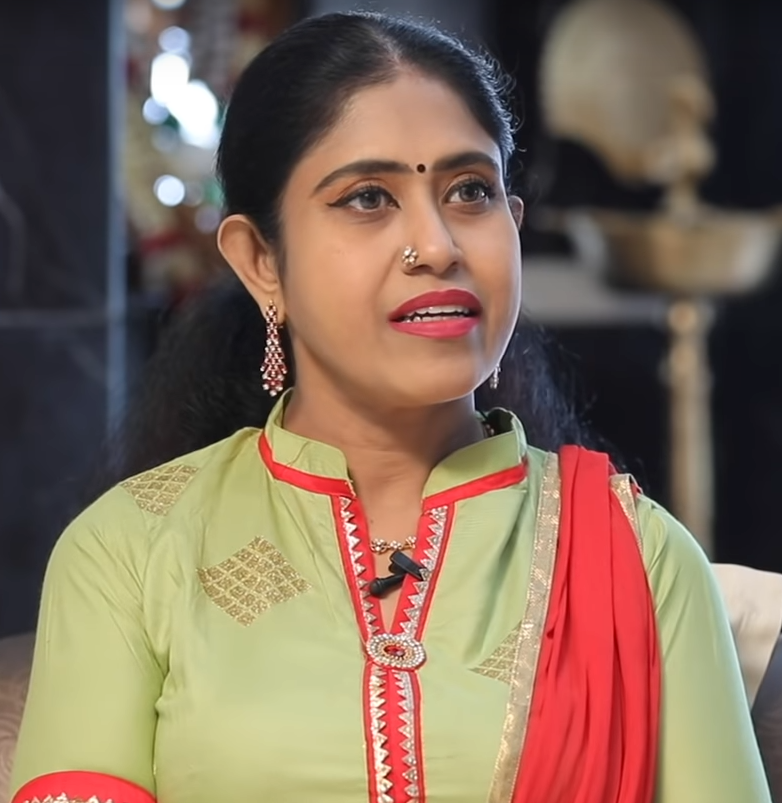
- S. Vijayadharani in 2020

Member of Tamil Nadu Legislative Assembly
- In office 23 May 2011 – 24 February 2024
- Chief Minister: J. Jayalalithaa; O. Panneerselvam; Edappadi K. Palaniswami; M. K. Stalin
- Preceded by: G. John Joseph
- Succeeded by: Tharahai Cuthbert
- Constituency: Vilavancode

Personal details
- Born: 13 October 1969 (age 56) Kanniyakumari, Tamil Nadu, India
- Party: Tamilaga Vettri Kazhagam
- Other political affiliations: Bharatiya Janata Party (2024-2026); Indian National Congress (until 2024)
- Spouse: Sivakumar Kennedy (died 2016)
- Children: 2
- Profession: Advocate, Politician

S. Vijayadharani is an Indian politician representing Tamilaga Vettri Kazhagam. She was a former member of the Tamil Nadu Legislative Assembly from the Vilavancode constituency elected from the Indian National Congress party.

== Personal life ==
S. Vijayadharani has a son and a daughter. Her daughter, Dr. Abrami Kennedy studied medicine and works as an MD at a private medical college in Chennai. She married Dr. Deepak Rajadurai in February 2019. She is great-grand daughter of Tamil poet and social reformer, late Kavimani Desigavinayagam Pillai.

== Political career ==
=== Indian National Congress ===
Vijayadharani is a former President of Tamil Nadu Mahila Congress. During 2016 she was appointed General Secretary of All India Mahila Congress, Incharge of Karnataka. She was elected for the second time in 2016 to the Tamilnadu Legislative Assembly. And again she got elected for the third time in 2021 consecutively from the same constituency (Vilavancode) in Kanyakumari district.

=== BJP (2024–2026) ===
She shared her resignation letter to Congress office and joined BJP in the Head office of BJP in Delhi on 24 February 2024.

=== TVK (2026–present) ===
She shared her resignation letter to BJP office and joined Tamilaga Vettri Kazhagam in the Head office of TVK in Chennai on 13 June 2026.

== Electoral performance ==
=== Tamil Nadu Legislative Assembly Elections ===
Year	Party	Constituency	Result	Votes gained	Vote %
2011	Indian National Congress	Vilavancode	Won	62,898	43.69%
2016	Indian National Congress	Vilavancode	Won	68,789	42.43%
2021	Indian National Congress	Vilavancode	Won	87,473	52.12%
2026	Bharatiya Janata Party	Vilavancode	Lost	45,604	26.07%
