= Tharahai Cuthbert =

Indian politician

- Tharahai Cuthbert in 2024

Leader of Congress Legislative Party Tamil Nadu Legislative Assembly
- Incumbent
- Assumed office 13 August 2026
- Preceded by: S. Rajeshkumar

Member of the Tamil Nadu Legislative Assembly
- Incumbent
- Assumed office 4 May 2026
- Preceded by: J. G. Prince
- Constituency: Colachel
- In office 4 June 2024 – 4 May 2026
- Preceded by: S. Vijayadharani
- Succeeded by: T. T. Praveen
- Constituency: Vilavancode

Personal details
- Born: May 9, 1975 (age 51) Kulasekaram, Kanyakumari district, Tamil Nadu, India
- Party: Indian National Congress
- Spouse: Ashok George
- Children: 1 son
- Profession: politician, Proprietor of Taraz Readymade Garments & Unform Manufacturing Unit

Tharahai Cuthbert is an Indian politician representing the Indian National Congress. She was elected to the Tamil Nadu Legislative Assembly from the Vilavancode constituency in June 2024, in a bypoll necessitated by the resignation of S. Vijayadharani in February 2024.

== Electoral performance ==
Electoral results
Year	Constituency	Party	Result	Votes	Vote %
2024	Vilavancode	Indian National Congress	Won	91,054	57.71
2026	Colachel	Indian National Congress	Won	66,207	33.27
