= A. Nesamony =

Indian political leader

A. Nesamony Nadar

Member of Parliament, Lok Sabha
- In office 1952–1957
- Preceded by: Office established
- Succeeded by: P. Thanulinga Nadar
- Constituency: Nagercoil
- In office 1962–1968
- Preceded by: P. Thanulinga Nadar
- Succeeded by: K. Kamaraj
- Constituency: Nagercoil

Member of Madras Legislative Assembly
- In office 1957–1962
- Preceded by: R. Ponnappan Nadar
- Succeeded by: R. Ponnappan Nadar
- Constituency: Killiyoor

Personal details
- Born: 12 June 1895 Nesarpuram, Palliyadi, Vilavancode Taluk, Southern Travancore, Travancore
- Died: 1 June 1968 (aged 72)
- Party: Travancore Tamil Nadu Congress; Indian National Congress
- Spouse: Caroline Nadar
- Parent: Apollos (father)
- Education: B.A., B.L.
- Alma mater: C.M.S. College, Tirunelvelli; Maharaja's College, Trivandrum; Government Law College, Trivandrum
- Profession: Politician, Lawyer

Appavu Nesamony, sometimes known as Marshal Nesamony, was a political leader from Kanyakumari district in Tamil Nadu, India. He was the second son of Kesavan Appavu Nadar, born on 12 June 1895 at Nesarpuram, Palliyadi in Vilavancode Taluk, Kanyakumari district. He graduated from Maharaja's College in Thiruvananthapuram and studied law in Thiruvananthapuram. He began practising in 1921. He was among those involved with the merger of four Taluks from Southern Travancore to Tamil Nadu.

== Early life ==
He was educated at Scott Christian High School and then at C.M.S. College in Tirunelveli. While studying at C.M.S. College, he was elected as students' leader, which provided him with an opportunity to attend the Congress Conference at Calcutta. Influenced by Mahatma Gandhi at that time, he chose to wear only Khadi cotton dresses throughout his life. He graduated with a BA degree from Maharaja's College, Trivandrum, after which he began teaching, spending a year at Kurnool Bishop Heeber High school. He later became headmaster at Salvation Army Middle School in Trivandrum. Simultaneously, he pursued his law studies at Government Law College, Thiruvananthapuram. He married M. Caroline on 1 September 1914. He had one son and six daughters.

== Legal practice ==
Nesamony registered as a lawyer at Nagercoil Sessions Court in 1921. He became a criminal lawyer at Nagercoil Bar. He was elected as the president of Nagercoil Lawyers' Association in 1943. In the same year, he was also elected as the chairman of the Nagercoil Municipal Council. Shri Nesamony was a distinguished lawyer. Many young advocates irrespective of caste or religion wished to become his juniors. They gained much from him and later contributed to society as lawyers and politicians. A few among them were Chidambaranathan Nadar, Ponnappan Nadar, Gopalakrishnan, Fakrudeen Adam, and Razak. The TTNC president Sam Nathaniel was also his junior.

== Public life ==
- 1941-1942: Advocate; Member, Travancore Bar Council
- Senate, Travancore University
- 1943-1947: Chairman of Nagercoil Municipality
- 1943 President, Nagercoil Bar Association
- 1945-1947: Member of Travancore Legislative (Thirumoolam) Assembly and nominated member to the Senate of the Travancore University
- 1948- 1952: Member of Travancore - Cochin Legislative Assembly
- October 1947: Launched TTNC as a political party
- 1943-1947 Member: Travancore Legislative Assembly
- 1948-1952: Member of Travancore-Cochin Constituent Assembly & leader of TTNC parliamentary party in assembly
- 1952-1957: President of Travancore, Tamilnadu Congress Party
- 1952-1957: Member of Parliament, Nagercoil Constituency
- 1957-1959: President, District Congress Committee,
- 1957-1962: Member of Tamil Nadu Legislative Assembly
- 1962-1968: Member of Parliament, Nagercoil Constituency

== Role in Diocese ==
- 1933 - 1947: Secretary, Travancore & Mission Church Councils
- 1934 - 1942: South District Pastorate Council
- 1947 - 1960: Vice President - South Travancore Diocesan Council, C.S.I
- 1960 - 1968: Vice President - Kanyakumari Diocesan Council, C.S.I

== Political career ==
He was a Member of Parliament elected from Tamil Nadu. He was elected to the Lok Sabha from Nagercoil constituency as an Indian National Congress candidate in 1951, 1962 and 1967 elections.

He was also a Member of the Legislative Assembly. He was elected to the Tamil Nadu legislative assembly as an Indian National Congress candidate from Killiyur constituency in 1957 election.

== Kanyakumari district merger with Tamil Nadu ==
=== Background ===
Feudalism prevailed in the erstwhile state of Travancore. The jenmi system protected the socioeconomic and political status of the upper castes only, while the lower castes were exploited in many ways. Events such as the Upper Cloth Controversy and the Temple Entry Proclamation were reactions to this.

=== Events ===
A consequence of the social oppression and political repression was an ongoing campaign for recognition by the affected groups during the late nineteenth and early twentieth centuries. For example, this was evidenced by the creation of the Nair Service Society and the SNDP.

The agitation intensified after Indian independence. A campaign was launched under the political movement called the Travancore Tamil Nadu Congress (TTNC) to fight against the social ills that existed in the former state of Travancore. The TTNC later converted into a political party in order to contest elections. Suffered imprisonment at the hands of the P.S.P Government of the TC State during the agitation for the Merger of Travancore Tamil Area with the Madras State It culminated in the formation of Kanyakumari district and its subsequent merger with Tamil Nadu on 1 November 1956 during the linguistic reorganisation of states.

Immediately thereafter, the TTNC merged with the Indian National Congress and became fully integrated with the national mainstream. Nesamany worked for the return of Kanyakumari to Tamil Nadu. He was known as a champion, of the Tamil language and Tamilians. He was a good public worker.

- Founder, Nagercoil Municipal Destitute Home
- Chairman, Municipal Council Nagercoil
- Member T.C Town And Country Planning Association
- President Nagercoil Bar Association
- Member T.C Tuberculosis Association
- President Village Uplift Committee Nattalam- Vilavancode
- Member Medical Board College Council and the Education Board of the South Travancore Diocesan Council
- Convener Degree College Committee Nagercoil

== Publications ==
- Inside Travancore, Tamil Nadu
- Rule of Steel and Fire in Travancore Cochin
- Printed and Published Tamil Weekly "Thingal"

== Recreation and Hobby ==
- Tennis and cards-play
- Cinema
- Gardening and reading

== Special interest ==
- Study of Law

== Death and legacy ==
Nesamony died on 1 June 1968 while serving as a member in the Lok Sabha. This caused a by-election in his Nagercoil constituency in 1969, which was won by Kamaraj.

Nesamony fought for the rights of minorities and their establishment. He has been held in high esteem. He was a man who saw the realisation of the dream of the people of Kanyakumari District, namely, the merger of Kanyakumari District with Tamil Nadu.

There have been various tributes paid to his memory since that time. These include:

- The establishment of Nesamony Memorial Christian College at Marthandam
- The erection of a statue near Anna bus-stand in the heart of Nagercoil, together with a memorial building
- The creation of a satellite township called Nesamony Nagar on the outskirts of Nagercoil, where the headquarters of the former Nesamony Transport Corporation (a Tamil Nadu government undertaking) existed
- The naming of the bridge built across the Kuzhithurai river as Nesamony Paalam
- His birthplace in Palliyadi was named Nesarpuram.
- A park near Thingalnagar-Monday Market Bus-stand in Kanyakumari district was named Nesamony Poonga
- The central government published commemorative postal envelopes in recognition of the centenary of his birth in 1995.
- Tamil Nadu government opened a memorial on 27 February 2014 at Nagercoil
