= D. Moni =

Indian politician

D. Moni is an Indian politician. He was elected to Tamil Nadu legislative assembly three times from Vilavancode constituency. He won 1980, 1996, 2001 elections contesting as Communist Party of India (Marxist) candidate.
