= Nesamony Nagar =

Nesamony Nagar is a middle and upper-middle-class, planned residential hub in Keelakarai Village, Nagercoil Municipality, Agastheeswaram Taluk.

It came into being in 1950s and is named after Marshall Nesamony, the founding father of Kanyakumari district, India, who resided here. On the way to Aasaripallam, the Catholic Bishop's House & Simon Nager on the East, the West Lutheran street & Weavers Colony on the North, Ananthan Nager & Perumal Nager on the West & the West Konam Road & the Konam Pond on South make the small Urban Habitat.

The residential hub is traversed in its centre by Asaripallam Main Road which is also known as Medical College Road as it heads to Kanyakumari Government Medical College Road and Hospital. It is a district main road with number 432. Initially, it was a single lane road that was widened and upgraded into a dual lane road by Nagercoil Municipality in 2005.

Nesamony Nagar is situated under the city limits of Nagercoil City Corporation and thus it is managed under Mayor of Nagercoil. It has Nesamony police station.

Pertaining to trade and economy, as said above Nesamony Nagar is predominantly a residential area. Health care provision is very adequate as this area has many medical clinics and hospitals such as the Caroline hospital and St. Antony's Neuro Centre. Moreover, it is just 2 kilometers from Government Medical College Hospital.
