= M. Sundardas =

Indian politician

M. Sundardas is an Indian politician three times Member of Legislative assembly. He was elected to Tamil Nadu legislative assembly from Vilavancode constituency in 1984, 1989 and 1991 elections as an Indian National Congress candidate.
