= Vilavancode Assembly constituency =

One of the 234 State Legislative Assembly Constituencies in Tamil Nadu, in India

Coordinates: 8°20′42″N 77°02′31″E

Vilavancode
- Constituency No. 233 for the Tamil Nadu Legislative Assembly

Constituency details
- Country: India
- Region: South India
- State: Tamil Nadu
- District: Kanniyakumari
- Lok Sabha constituency: Kanniyakumari
- Established: 1951
- Total electors: 2,28,697
- Reservation: None

Member of Legislative Assembly
- 17th Tamil Nadu Legislative Assembly
- Incumbent T. T. Praveen
- Party: INC
- Alliance: TVK+
- Elected year: 2026

Vilavancode is a legislative assembly constituency in Kanyakumari district in the Indian state of Tamil Nadu. It is one of the 234 State Legislative Assembly Constituencies in Tamil Nadu.

== Members of the Legislative Assembly ==
Year	Winner	Party
Travancore-Cochin
1952	Alexandar Manual Simon	Travancore Tamil Nadu Congress
1954	William	Travancore Tamil Nadu Congress
Madras State
1957	William	Indian National Congress
1962	William	Indian National Congress
1967	R. Ponnappan Nadar	Indian National Congress
Tamil Nadu
1971	R. Ponnappan Nadar	Indian National Congress (O)
1977	D. Gnanasigamony	Communist Party of India (Marxist)
1980	D. Moni	Communist Party of India (Marxist)
1984	M. Sundardas	Indian National Congress
1989	M. Sundardas	Indian National Congress
1991	M. Sundardas	Indian National Congress
1996	D. Moni	Communist Party of India (Marxist)
2001	D. Moni	Communist Party of India (Marxist)
2006	G. John Joseph	Communist Party of India (Marxist)
2011	S. Vijayadharani	Indian National Congress
2016	S. Vijayadharani	Indian National Congress
2021	S. Vijayadharani	Indian National Congress
2024^	Tharahai Cuthbert	Indian National Congress
2026	T. T. Praveen	Indian National Congress

== Election results ==
Vote share of winning candidates
2026	40.45%
2024	57.71%
2021	52.12%
2016	42.43%
2011	43.69%
2006	53.74%
2001	56.75%
1996	43.35%
1991	48.86%
1989	42.25%
1984	57.49%
1980	53.66%
1977	48.85%
1971	61.79%
1967	56.19%
1962	58.19%
1954	63.87%
1952	42.85%

=== 2026 ===
2026 Tamil Nadu Legislative Assembly election: Vilavancode
Party	Candidate	Votes	%	±%
INC	T. T. Praveen	70,755	40.45	▼17.27
TVK	K. Michael Kumar	49,785	28.46	New
BJP	S. Vijayadharani	45,604	26.07	▼6.18
NOTA	None of the above	828	0.47	▼0.11
Margin of victory		20,970	11.99	
Turnout		1,74,927	76.49	▲11.09
Registered electors		2,28,697		▼11,181
INC hold		Swing	▼17.27	

=== 2024 by-election ===
2024 Bye election: Vilavancode
Party	Candidate	Votes	%	±%
INC	Tharahai Cuthbert	91,054	57.72	+5%
BJP	V.S. Nanthini	50,880	32.25	−3%
AIADMK	U. Rani	5,267	3.34	New
NOTA	None of the above	919	0.58	
Margin of victory		40,174		
Turnout			65.40%	−2.32%
Registered electors		239,878		
INC hold		Swing		

=== 2021 ===
2021 Tamil Nadu Legislative Assembly election: Vilavancode
Party	Candidate	Votes	%	±%
INC	S. Vijayadharani	87,473	52.12%	+9.69
BJP	R. Jayaseelan	58,804	35.04%	+13.05
Independent	Samuel George Kalai Arasar	3,541	2.11%	New
DMDK	L. Iden Soni	2,447	1.46%	New
Margin of victory		28,669	17.08%	−3.36%
Turnout		167,836	67.72%	1.37%
Registered electors		247,853		
INC hold		Swing	9.69%	

=== 2016 ===
2016 Tamil Nadu Legislative Assembly election: Vilavancode
Party	Candidate	Votes	%	±%
INC	S. Vijayadharani	68,789	42.43%	−1.27
BJP	C. Dharmaraj	35,646	21.98%	−4.25
CPI(M)	R. Chellaswamy	25,821	15.93%	−11.24
AIADMK	Nanjil Domenic Savio George	24,801	15.30%	New
NOTA	NOTA	1,149	0.71%	New
BSP	T. Shibu	955	0.59%	−0.04
Margin of victory		33,143	20.44%	3.91%
Turnout		162,139	66.34%	−2.98%
Registered electors		244,388		
INC hold		Swing	-1.27%	

=== 2011 ===
2011 Tamil Nadu Legislative Assembly election: Vilavancode
Party	Candidate	Votes	%	±%
INC	S. Vijayadharani	62,898	43.69%	New
CPI(M)	R. Leemarose	39,109	27.17%	−26.57
BJP	R. Jayaseelan	37,763	26.23%	+15.78
Independent	T. Wilson	1,144	0.79%	New
BSP	B. Promoth	911	0.63%	New
Margin of victory		23,789	16.53%	−21.01%
Turnout		143,948	69.32%	7.88%
Registered electors		207,644		
INC gain from CPI(M)		Swing	-10.05%	

=== 2006 ===
2006 Tamil Nadu Legislative Assembly election: Vilavancode
Party	Candidate	Votes	%	±%
CPI(M)	G. John Joseph	64,532	53.74%	−3.01
AIADMK	F. Franklin	19,458	16.20%	New
NCP	Pon. Vijaya Raghavan	13,434	11.19%	New
BJP	L. Devadhas	12,553	10.45%	New
DMDK	L. Idan Sony	7,309	6.09%	New
Independent	E. George	1,182	0.98%	New
Margin of victory		45,074	37.54%	15.52%
Turnout		120,076	61.44%	9.98%
Registered electors		195,426		
CPI(M) hold		Swing	-3.01%	

=== 2001 ===
2001 Tamil Nadu Legislative Assembly election: Vilavancode
Party	Candidate	Votes	%	±%
CPI(M)	D. Moni	59,087	56.75%	+13.41
DMK	P. Jeevaraj	36,168	34.74%	+12.91
MDMK	A. Jayaraj	6,494	6.24%	New
Independent	P. Radhakrishnanc	1,181	1.13%	New
Margin of victory		22,919	22.01%	0.49%
Turnout		104,113	51.46%	−10.12%
Registered electors		202,315		
CPI(M) hold		Swing	13.41%	

=== 1996 ===
1996 Tamil Nadu Legislative Assembly election: Vilavancode
Party	Candidate	Votes	%	±%
CPI(M)	D. Moni	42,867	43.35%	+5.5
DMK	V. Thankaraj	21,585	21.83%	New
BJP	N. Sreenivasan	16,141	16.32%	+4.13
INC	M. Sundaradas	13,057	13.20%	−35.66
AIIC(T)	K. S. Janakaraj	1,713	1.73%	New
Independent	P. Babu	1,156	1.17%	New
Independent	C. Chandran	681	0.69%	New
Margin of victory		21,282	21.52%	10.50%
Turnout		98,891	61.58%	2.88%
Registered electors		169,313		
CPI(M) gain from INC		Swing	-5.52%	

=== 1991 ===
1991 Tamil Nadu Legislative Assembly election: Vilavancode
Party	Candidate	Votes	%	±%
INC	M. Sundardas	50,151	48.86%	+6.62
CPI(M)	D. Moni	38,842	37.85%	−3.16
BJP	C. Rajeswaran	12,511	12.19%	+2.6
Independent	P. Durairaj	548	0.53%	New
Margin of victory		11,309	11.02%	9.77%
Turnout		102,634	58.70%	−5.06%
Registered electors		178,941		
INC hold		Swing	6.62%	

=== 1989 ===
1989 Tamil Nadu Legislative Assembly election: Vilavancode
Party	Candidate	Votes	%	±%
INC	M. Sundardas	41,168	42.25%	−15.24
CPI(M)	D. Moni	39,954	41.00%	−1.51
BJP	K. Chandrasenan	9,347	9.59%	New
Independent	D. Somasekharan Nair	5,292	5.43%	New
AIADMK	T. Valasalamrose	1,040	1.07%	New
Independent	K. Dasaian	644	0.66%	New
Margin of victory		1,214	1.25%	−13.74%
Turnout		97,445	63.75%	0.59%
Registered electors		155,021		
INC hold		Swing	-15.24%	

=== 1984 ===
1984 Tamil Nadu Legislative Assembly election: Vilavancode
Party	Candidate	Votes	%	±%
INC	M. Sundardas	47,169	57.49%	New
CPI(M)	D. Moni	34,876	42.51%	−11.16
Margin of victory		12,293	14.98%	1.13%
Turnout		82,045	63.16%	10.64%
Registered electors		135,185		
INC gain from CPI(M)		Swing	3.83%	

=== 1980 ===
1980 Tamil Nadu Legislative Assembly election: Vilavancode
Party	Candidate	Votes	%	±%
CPI(M)	D. Moni	34,170	53.66%	+4.81
DMK	P. Davis Raj	25,348	39.81%	New
JP	S. Packianathan	3,370	5.29%	New
Independent	C. Manas	413	0.65%	New
Independent	N. Purshothaman	372	0.58%	New
Margin of victory		8,822	13.86%	10.96%
Turnout		63,673	52.53%	−4.57%
Registered electors		122,522		
CPI(M) hold		Swing	4.81%	

=== 1977 ===
1977 Tamil Nadu Legislative Assembly election: Vilavancode
Party	Candidate	Votes	%	±%
CPI(M)	D. Gnanasigamony	32,628	48.85%	+33.1
JP	S. Sathiadas	30,695	45.96%	New
INC	A. Asary	3,165	4.74%	−57.05
Margin of victory		1,933	2.89%	−37.42%
Turnout		66,787	57.10%	−5.35%
Registered electors		117,831		
CPI(M) gain from INC		Swing	-12.94%	

=== 1971 ===
1971 Tamil Nadu Legislative Assembly election: Vilavancode
Party	Candidate	Votes	%	±%
INC	R. Ponnappan Nadar	32,139	61.79%	+5.6
DMK	G. Gnanaraj Christopher	11,170	21.48%	New
CPI(M)	D. Packia Das	8,195	15.76%	New
Independent	P. Alvin	506	0.97%	New
Margin of victory		20,969	40.32%	17.18%
Turnout		52,010	62.45%	−7.37%
Registered electors		85,839		
INC hold		Swing	5.60%	

=== 1967 ===
1967 Madras Legislative Assembly election: Vilavancode
Party	Candidate	Votes	%	±%
INC	R. Ponnappan Nadar	27,511	56.19%	
Independent	P. M. N. Pillai	16,184	33.05%	
SWA	S. Padmanabhan	4,297	8.78%	
Independent	G. Elias	969	1.98%	
Margin of victory		11,327	22.10%	−2.00%
Turnout		51,258	69.82%	
Registered electors		73,410		
INC hold		Swing		

=== 1962 ===
1962 Madras Legislative Assembly election: Vilavancode
Party	Candidate	Votes	%	±%
INC	M. William	30,386	58.19%	
CPI	D. Gnanasigamony (Marthamdom)	21,388	40.96%	
Independent	D. Gnanasigamony (Nagercoil)	441	0.84%	
Margin of victory		8,998	16.82%	
Turnout		53,488	69.63%	
Registered electors		76,820		
INC hold		Swing		

=== 1957 ===
1962 Madras Legislative Assembly election: Vilavancode
Party	Candidate	Votes	%	±%
INC	M. William	Unopposed		
Registered electors		67,159		
INC gain from TTNC		Swing		

=== 1954 ===
1954 Travancore-Cochin Legislative Assembly election: Vilavancode
Party	Candidate	Votes	%	±%
TTNC	M. William	17,291	63.87%	▲21.02
CPI	G. S Mony	8,274	30.56%	
INC	Josepth	1,509	5.57%	▼16.87
Margin of victory		9,017	33.31%	▲12.89%
Turnout		27,074	67.65%	
Registered electors		40,019		
TTNC hold		Swing		

=== 1952 ===
1952 Travancore-Cochin Legislative Assembly election: Vilavancode
Party	Candidate	Votes	%	±%
TTNC	Alexander Mannuel Simon	12,089	42.85%	
INC	Doraswamy. S.	6,330	22.44%	
SP	Neelakanda Pillai. P. M.	4,329	15.35%	
TTP	Arjunan	3,071	10.89%	
Independent	Sathyanesan. A. N.	1,419	5.03%	
RSP	Sreedharan Nair. N.	972	3.45%	
Margin of victory		5,759	20.41%	
Turnout		28,210	73.37%	
Registered electors		38,448		
TTNC win (new seat)				
