= T. T. Praveen =

Indian politician (born 1978)

Member of the Tamil Nadu Legislative Assembly
- Incumbent
- Assumed office 2026
- Preceded by: Tharahai Cuthbert
- Constituency: Vilavancode
- Majority: 20,970

Personal details
- Born: 30 May 1978 (age 48) Vilavancode, Kanyakumari district, Tamil Nadu, India
- Occupation: Politician; businessman

T. T. Praveen (born 30 May 1978) is an Indian politician from Tamil Nadu. He is a member of the Tamil Nadu Legislative Assembly from the Vilavancode Assembly constituency in Kanyakumari district representing the Indian National Congress.

Praveen is from Vilavancode, Kanyakumari district, Tamil Nadu. He is the son of Thomson. He completed his MTech in Computer and Technology in 2008. He runs his own business. He declared assets worth Rs.67 crore in his affidavit to the Election Commission of India.

== Career ==
Praveen won the Vilavancode Assembly constituency representing the Indian National Congress in the 2026 Tamil Nadu Legislative Assembly election. He polled 70,755 votes and defeated his nearest rival, K. Michael Kumar of the Tamilaga Vettri Kazhagam, by a margin of 20,970 votes.
