= S. John Jacob =

Indian politician

S. John Jacob (19 May 1953 in Paduvoor – 13 February 2018) was an Indian politician and was a Member of the Legislative Assembly (MLA) in Tamil Nadu.

He was married and has two children.

Jacob was elected to the Tamil Nadu Legislative Assembly as an Indian National Congress (INC) candidate from Killiyur constituency in Kanyakumari district in the 2006 election. He was one of 14 MLAs who had a 100 per cent attendance record in the 13th Tamil Nadu Legislative Assembly.

Jacob was re-elected from Killiyur as an INC candidate in 2011 but switched his allegiance to the Tamil Maanila Congress (TMC) when G. K. Vasan revived it in 2014. Assigned to the Killiyur constituency once again, his was one of 26 names put forward by the TMC to contest the 2016 state assembly elections as part of an alliance with the People's Welfare Front and Desiya Murpokku Dravida Kazhagam. However, one week later it was announced that D. Kumaradas would contest the seat for the TMC instead. The constituency was won by the INC candidate, S. Rajeshkumar.
