= Alexander Manual Simon =

Indian politician

Alexander Manual Simon was an Indian politician and former and first Member of the Legislative Assembly. He was elected to the Travancore-Cochin assembly as Tamil Nadu Congress candidate from Vilavancode constituency in Kanyakumari district in 1952 election. This was the first election from this constituency and it happened before Kanyakumari district merged with Tamil Nadu. He was elected again from Kollencode constituency as a Tamil Nadu Congress candidate in 1954 interim election.
