= William Ellis Corey =

American business executive (1866–1934)

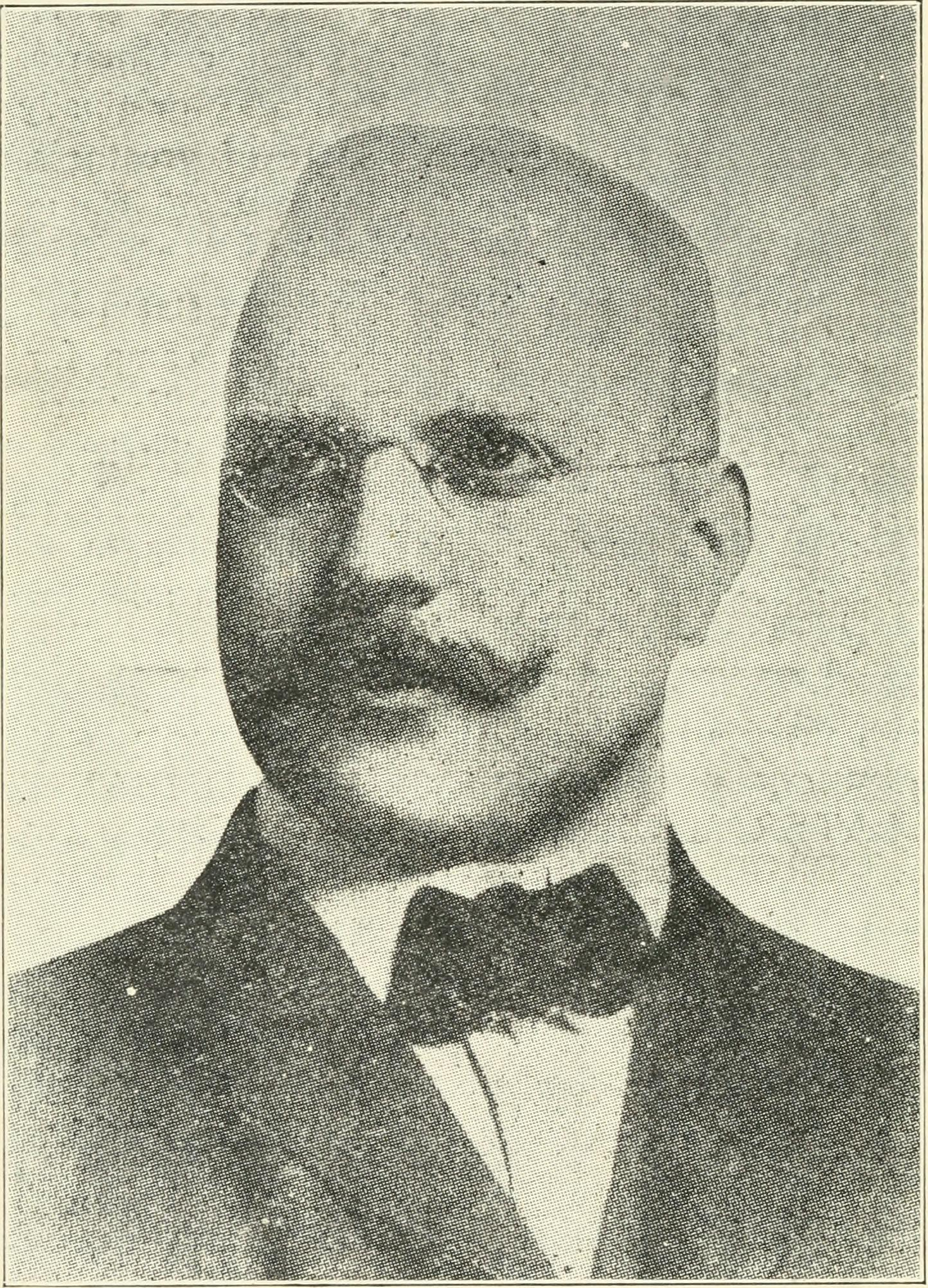
- Corey in 1922

2nd President of U.S. Steel
- In office 1903–1911
- Preceded by: Charles M. Schwab
- Succeeded by: James A. Farrell Sr.

President of the Carnegie Steel Company
- In office 1901–1903

Personal details
- Born: May 4, 1866 Braddock, Pennsylvania, US
- Died: May 11, 1934 (aged 68) Manhattan, New York City, US
- Spouse(s): Laura Cook (m. 1883–1906) Mabelle Gilman (m. 1907–1923)

William Ellis Corey (May 4, 1866 – May 11, 1934) was an American business executive. He was president of the Carnegie Steel Company from 1901 to 1903, and was president of the U.S. Steel from 1903 to 1911.

== Biography ==
Corey was born on May 4, 1866, in Braddock, Pennsylvania, the son of merchant Alfred A. Corey. He originally worked as a wheelbarrow pusher for a foundry. By age 16, he worked as an assistant at the Edgar Thomson Steel Works. He then transferred to Homestead Steel Works, rising its ranks and becoming the superindentent. From 1901 to 1903, he was president of the Carnegie Steel Company, and from 1903 to 1911, was president of U.S. Steel.

On December 1883, he married Laura Cook, whom he met when she worked for his family. They married before she became an adult, and together, they had one son, Allan L. Corey. In 1906, Laura filed for divorce in Reno, Nevada, charging that William had deserted her in May 1903 or August 1905. Laura was awarded custody of Allan and a settlement of $3,000,000 (approximately $107,500,000 today). He had an affair with actress Mabelle Gilman, who he married on May 14, 1907. They divorced by 1924, though Corey attempted to reconcile their relationship by traveling to Paris to meet her.

The city of Fairfield, Alabama was originally named for Corey in 1910, by the Tennessee Coal, Iron and Railroad Company (TCI), which built the city as a model city for workers at the company's nearby Fairfield Works. The negative publicity from Corey's divorce prompted U.S. Steel to rename the city for the company president's hometown in Connecticut.

In 1911, Corey resigned his position as president of U.S. Steel.

Corey died on May 11, 1934, aged 68, in Manhattan, from pneumonia and atherosclerosis.
