= D. Gnanasigamony =

Indian politician

D. Gnanasigamony was an Indian politician and former Member of the Legislative Assembly. He was elected to the Tamil Nadu legislative assembly as a Communist Party of India (Marxist) candidate from Vilavancode constituency in Kanyakumari district in 1977 election.
