= Charles Kamalam Job =

Indian surgeon

- Born: 2 November 1923; Palliyadi, Kanniyakumari District, Tamil Nadu
- Died: 28 May 2012 (aged 88); Vellore, India
- Children: Three

Dr. Charles Kamalam Job (1923–2012) was a leading Indian medical surgeon. He is considered to be a pioneer of leprosy treatment in the world. His research interests were related to pathology and immunology of leprosy and its transmission. He was the earliest scientist to use the electron microscope in India, particularly for leprosy research, which was installed at the Christian Medical College in 1963. He was awarded the American High Award - Damien-Dutton Award in 1993, for his pathbreaking leprosy research inventions, by American President Bill Clinton.

== Personal life ==
Dr. Charles Kamalam Job was born on 2 November 1923 in Palliyadi, Kanyakumari district, to Dr.Charles kamalam and Ponammal as the youngest of 11 children of a devout Christian family. He graduated in science from Travancore in 1942. After a short stint as a school teacher, he obtained an MBBS degree in 1953 from Christian Medical College, Vellore and was appointed as a physician subsequently in the newly-started Schieffelin Leprosy Research Sanatorium at Karigiri. Soon, he became the director of the sanatorium. Until his death, he remained as Scientist Emeritus at Karigiri and in St. Thomas Leprosy Centre and Hospital at Chettupattu.
