= Mabelle Gilman Corey =

American actress (1874–1960)

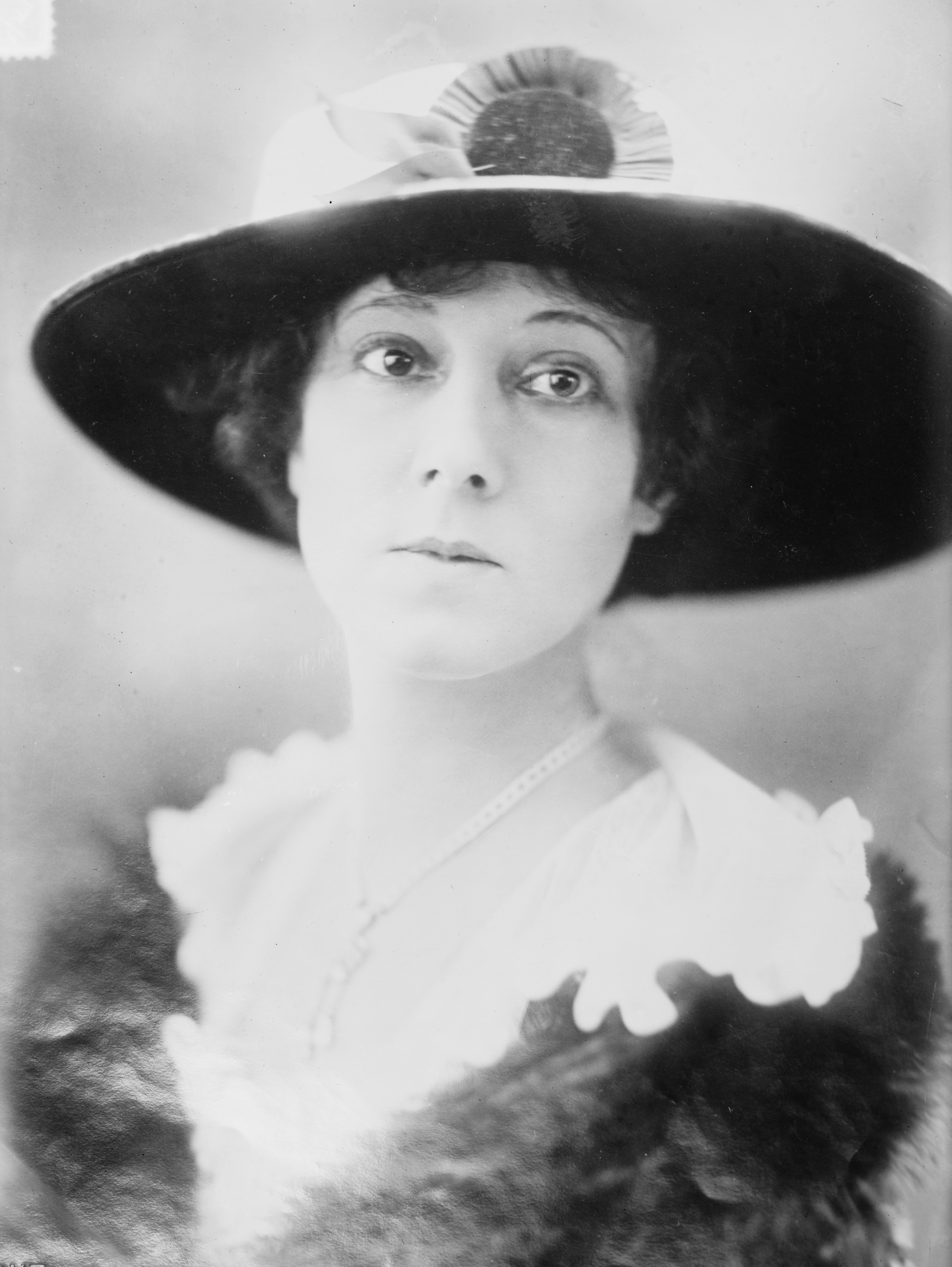
- Born: Mabelle Gillman; December 4, 1874; San Francisco, California
- Died: March 21, 1960 (aged 85)
- Other name: Mrs. William Ellis Corey
- Occupations: Actress socialite
- Years active: 1896–1907 (stage)
- Spouse: William E. Corey (m. 1907; div. 1923)

Mabelle Gilman Corey (December 4, 1874 – November 14, 1960) was an American actress. She had an affair with William Ellis Corey which led to the dissolution of his marriage, and they later married.

== Biography ==
She was born Mabelle Gilman to Charles Henry Gilman and Jeannette R. Curtis in San Francisco, California.

Gilman attended Mills College in Oakland, California. She studied voice under Julie Rosenwald. She would later make her forte in musical comedy.

=== Broadway ===
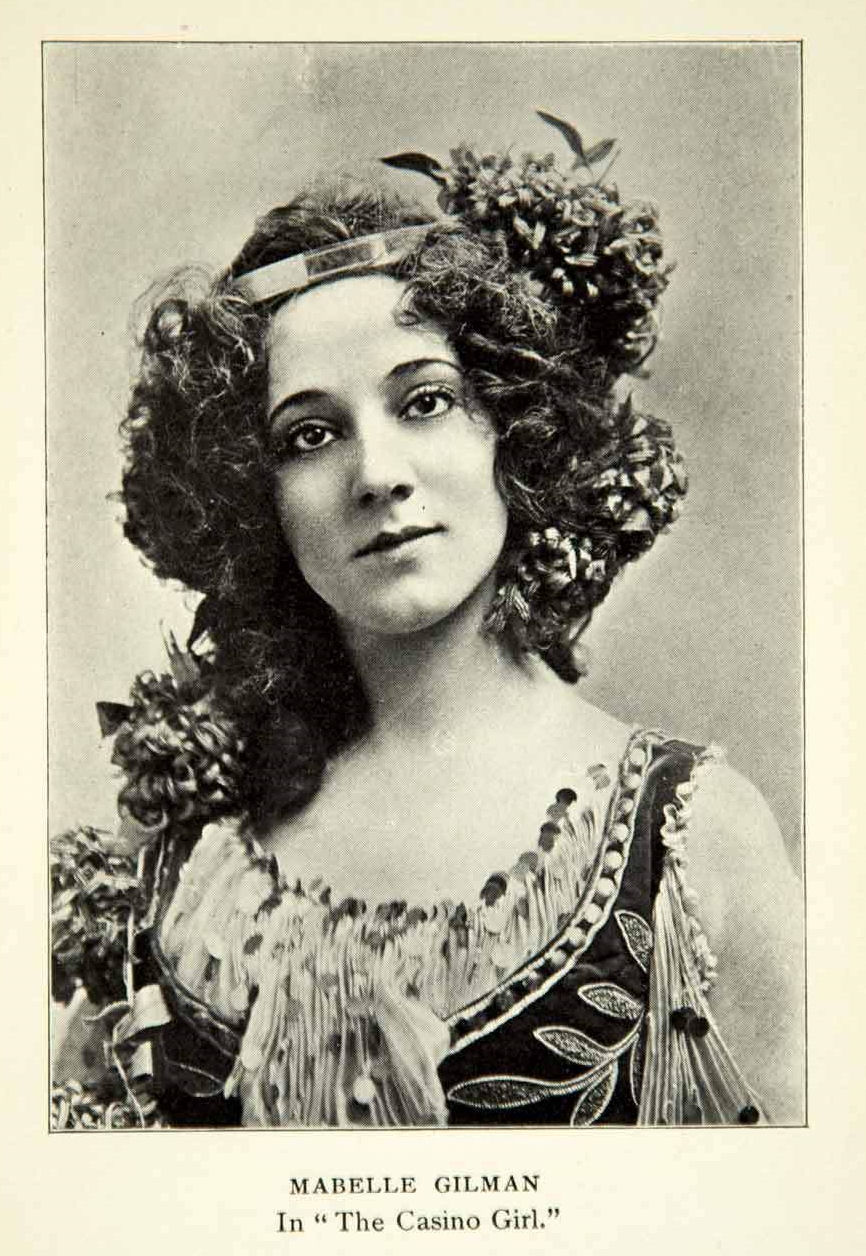
Gilman as Laura Lee in The Casino Girl (1900)

She first appeared on the stage in London at the Comedy Theatre on July 11, 1896, as Rosa in The Countess Gucki. In September 1896 she made her Broadway debut at Daly's playing O Kinkoto San in The Geisha (opened September 9, 1896). She played Lucille in The Circus Girl, Juno in The Tempest, Alice in The Runaway Girl (opened August 25, 1898) with James T. Powers and parts in Much Ado About Nothing and The Merchant of Venice. Gilman was in "In Gay Paree" (opened March 20, 1899), "The Rounders" (opened July 12, 1899), The Casino Girl (opened March 19, 1900) and The King's Carnival (opened September 9, 1901). She went to London to the Shaftesbury Theatre and opened The Casino Girl in London on July 11, 1900. Back in New York for the 1902 season she starred in The Hall of Fame (opened February 5, 1902) which had a great run. She closed out 1902 in The Mocking Bird (opened November 10, 1902). In 1903 Gilman was the heroine in Dolly which she also performed at the Avenue Theatre in London on October 1, 1903. At the Comedy Theatre (the first London theatre she appeared at in 1896) she was seen in a comic opera playing the title role in Amorelle.

=== Marriage ===
Gilman in 1905 was one of the top musical comedy stars on Broadway. In this year she first met William Ellis Corey during an engagement of The Mocking Bird in Pittsburgh. Corey was a millionaire, having made his fortune in steel. He was president of United States Steel. Corey had a wife Laura and a son Allan. His wife Laura, unable to divorce William in Pennsylvania and retain custody of her son or receive a settlement to support herself and her son, traveled to Reno, Nevada, to be granted a divorce from William. After satisfying the six-month residency requirement Laura filed for divorce, resulting in full custody of Allan and an unprecedented $3,000,000 (approximately $107,500,000 today) settlement. Pittsburgh society threatened to shun Corey if he married Mabelle. Mabelle and William Corey married on May 14, 1907.

Corey had bought his new wife a chateau in France, valuable jewels and had given her one million dollars all as a wedding present. Corey's Reno divorce from his first wife Laura and subsequent marriage to Mabelle help put Reno on the map as a destination for quickie divorces.

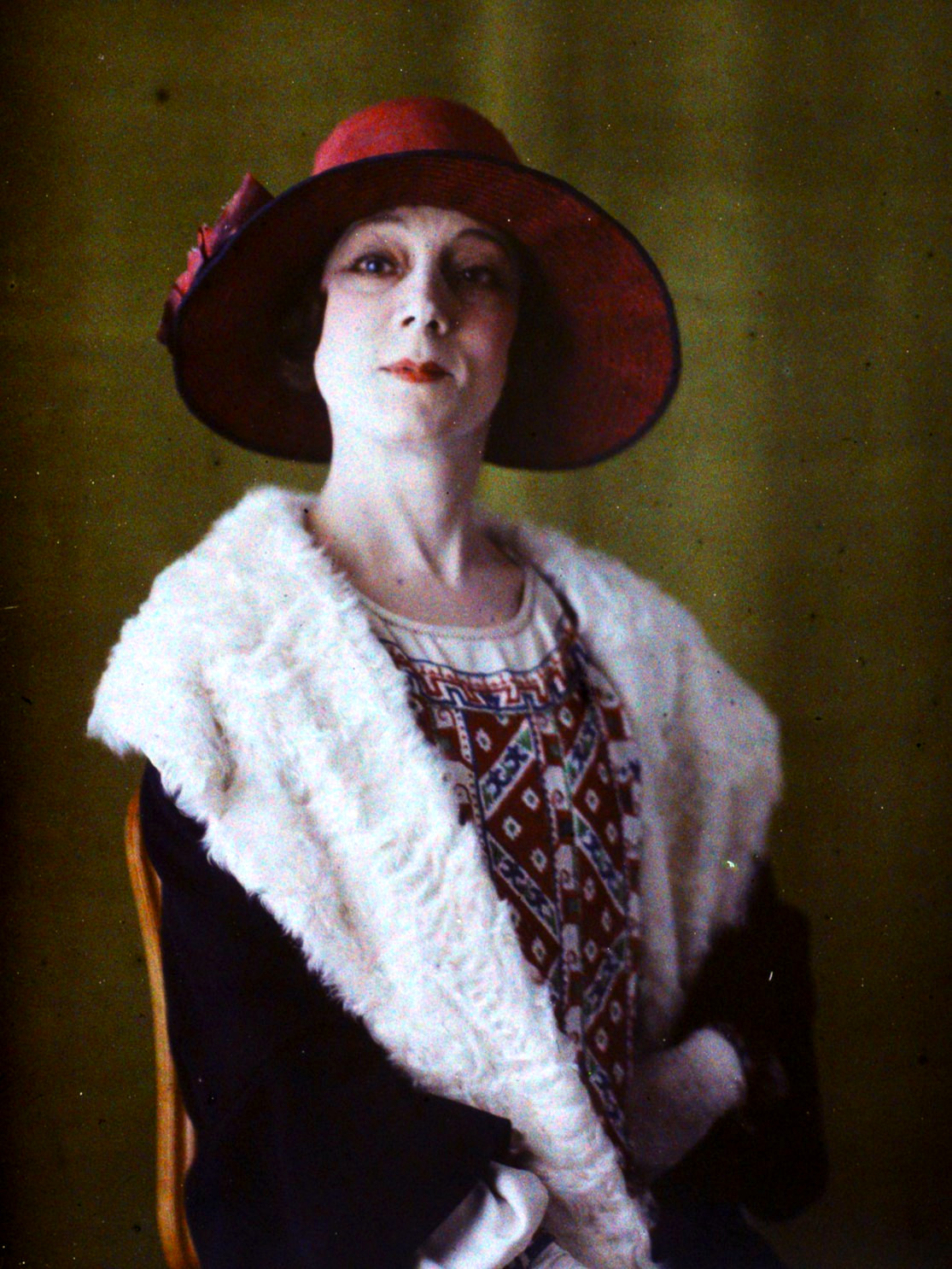
Autochrome by Georges Chevalier, 1929

=== Europe ===
Mabelle and her sisters Eunice and Pearl had all studied voice from Jean de Reszke, a noted tenor. Mabelle entertained high-profile guests to the Corey chateau in the years before World War I. She had plans for grand opera but her new duties as matron took up time for her preparations. She developed a dislike for her home country the United States, complaining of too much noise. Mabelle also said American men are more worried about accounts receivable, stocks, and bonds rather than their wives.

The marriage to William Corey deteriorated and divorce came in 1923.

While living in France, she was taken captive by the Nazis in 1940 and was placed in an internment camp near Vittel, but was released in 1942 after all female prisoners over 60 years of age were freed.
