= G. John Joseph =

Indian politician

G. John Joseph is an Indian politician and a current Member of the Legislative Assembly. He was elected to the Tamil Nadu Legislative Assembly as a Communist Party of India (Marxist) candidate from Vilavancode constituency in Kanyakumari district in 2006 election.
