= William (Vilavancode MLA) =

India politician

M. William

Member of the Madras State Assembly
- In office 1954 - 1957; 1957 - 1962; 1962 - 1967
- Preceded by: D. Gnanasigamony (Marthamdom)
- Constituency: Vilavancode
- In office 1967–1972
- Constituency: Killiyoor

Personal details
- Party: Indian National Congress

M. William was a veteran Indian politician and a five-time Member of the Legislative Assembly hailing from Palliyadi. He was elected twice to Travancore-Cochin assembly and three times to Madras State assembly.

== Political career ==
He was elected as a Member of Legislative Assembly to Travancore-Cochin Legislative Assembly in 1952 election from Arumana constituency as a Tamil Nadu Congress candidate. He was elected again as a Tamil Nadu Congress candidate from Vilavancode constituency in 1954 election to Travancore-Cochin assembly. He was elected to Tamil Nadu legislative assembly in 1957 and 1962 elections from Vilavancode constituency. and from Killiyur constituency in 1967 election.

== Legacy ==
The William Children Hospital, Marthandam is named after him.

== See also ==
- Vilavancode
