= Palliyadi =

Neighbourhood in Kanyakumari district, Tamil Nadu, India

- Town
- Location in Tamil Nadu, India Palliyadi (India)
- Coordinates: 8°16′08″N 77°14′56″E
- Country: India
- State: Tamil Nadu
- District: Kanniyakumari
- Elevation: 107 m (351 ft)

Population (2011)
  - Total: 7,012

Languages
  - Official: Tamil, English, Malayalam
- Time zone: UTC+5:30 (IST)
- Postal code: 629169

Palliyadi is a panchayat town in Kanniyakumari district in Indian state of Tamil Nadu. Tamil is the official language spoken; It has been a centre of life for many centuries and have been predominantly occupied by wealthy aristocrat Christian Nadars and Nair families. The majority of the population is Christian. The town has produced leading intellectuals, administrators, Judges, IPS officers, IAS officers, MPs and MLAs who have served the country and have contributed substantially in the fields of politics, education, literature, art, poetry, socio-religious and social reformation. The town is home to some of the largest Rubber Estate barons and Plantation owners in the State. The leading land and revenue administrators, during the reign of the Travancore Kingdom where, based out of Palliyadi families. The nearest accessible station is the railway station that goes under the same name.

== Education ==
Modern education in Palliyadi dates back to the 18th century, when Mr. James Emlyn from England, set up the LMS High School in Palliyadi. This helped provide modern education to the town. Thus, the town has played an important role in providing high-quality education and helping foster the district's educational needs.

Name of School	Type of organisation	Year of establishment
LMS Higher Secondary School	Matric school board	1881
St. John Vianney's Girls' Convent	Matric school board	1888
R.C.High School	Matric school board	1888
LMS Primary School	Matric school board	1898
St John's High School	Matric school board	1958

== Notable people ==
- Dr.Gunamudian David Boaz – Oxford University alumni and First Indian Psychologist. Also served as the Head of Department Madras University from 1938 to 1956.
- Dr. A.S. Johnson – Cambridge University alumni. First director of Trivandrum Mental Hospital (1933 - 1938). Former Director of Madras Medical College, from 1943 to 1957. Founder Indian Psychiatric Society, Delhi (1947).
- Dr. G. Manuel - Chief Surgeon, Neyyoor Mission Hospital (1879 - 1919).
- Dr. Vedhamonikam - Founder cum director, Marthandam Mission Hospital (1881 - 1895).
- M. Sajjanam - Travancore State Judge (1918 - 1956) and Founder of Nagercoil Bar Association (1916 - 1918).
- N. Paul Vasanthakumar – Chief Justice of Jammu & Kashmir.
- Dr.Charles Kamalam Job – Indian scientist and former director CMC
- Marshal Nesamony – former MP and freedom fighter.
- Raja Kesavadas – Dewan of Travancore from 1789 to 1798.
- William MLA – Six-time Vilavancode MLA, from 1947 to 1967.
- James MLA – Four-time Tiruvattar MLA, from 1962 to 1977.
- N.Wilson Appolos – Two-time Member of Legislative Council, from 1967 to 1980.
- C. Livingstone – Renowned Indian scientist.
- Devasahayam Pillai – Travancore Kingdom Court judge.
- H. Jayapal - Former Advocate General of Tamil Nadu.
- Sam Nathaniel – Freedom fighter and founder of Travancore Tamil Nadu Congress.
- Dr. John D.K. Sundersingh – former Principal, Scott Christian College.
- Ponniah. S.P – 1938 batch IPS Officer.
- Mallan Sankaran Nair – Travancore Chief-Land Revenue Administrator.
- W. Swamidhas – Founder, Dhas Motors.
- A. Amalraj - Inspector-general of police, Chennai.
- J. Nesamony - Founder of Nesamony Memorial Christian College, Marthandam.
- D. Harris Nadar - Millionaire Businessman, Jeweller, and Plantation Estate Baron.
- Sunny Manuel - Retd. District Collector.

== Religious ==
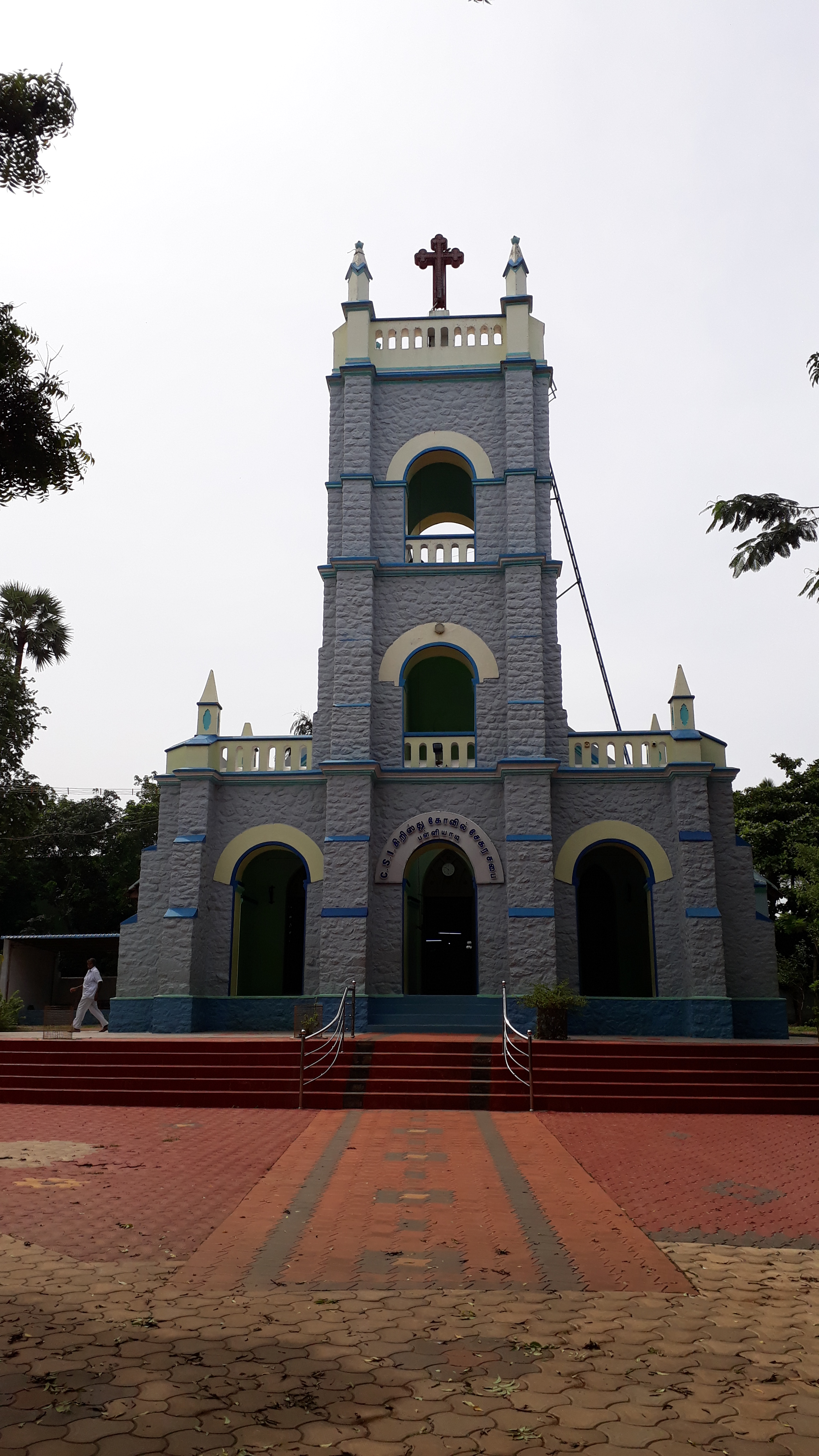
Kristucoil Church Palliyadi, built by Rev.James Emlyn in 1882

- Kristucoil London Mission Church
- Christucoil CSI Church
- Trippaniode Sivan Temple
- The Salvation Army Church
- Sacred Heart Roman Catholic Church
