= Pon. Vijayaraghavan =

Indian politician

Pon. Vijayaraghavan is a politician from Kanyakumari district who represents Bharatiya Janata Party.

== MLA elections ==
He was elected to Tamil Nadu legislative assembly three times from Kanyakumari district. He was elected from Killiyur constituency as a Janata Party candidate in 1977 election, as a Janata Party (JP) candidate in 1980 election and as an Independent candidate in 1989 election.

== MP elections ==
He lost the 1980 and 1984 elections as a Janata Party candidate against N. Dennis in Nagercoil Lok Sabha constituency. He lost the 1985 by-election as a Janata Party candidate against R. Dhanushkodi Adithan in Tiruchendur constituency.

== See also ==
- Nagercoil (Lok Sabha constituency)
