= Travancore Tamil Nadu Congress =

- Abbreviation: TTNC
- Leader: A. Nesamony
- Founder: Sam Nathaniel
- Founded: 1945
- Dissolved: 1957
- Colours: OrangeRed

The Travancore Tamil Nadu Congress (TTNC) was a political party in the Indian state of Travancore-Cochin. The party was founded by Sam Nathaniel and led by A. Nesamony, both natives of Palliyadi.

== History ==
The Kingdom of Travancore was a princely state of India. Its population included an ethnic Malayali majority and a Tamil minority; the latter suffered linguistic discrimination in education, and leaders of Tamil organisations expressed concern about disadvantage from lack of economic development. The Tamil minority formed several political parties, one of them being Travancore Tamil Nadu Congress.

The party's original platform was the formation of a separate Tamil state within Travancore. The party contested the first Travancore constituent assembly election in 1948 and won 14 seats in the 120-seat legislature.

In 1949, as part of the integration of India, Kingdom of Travancore merged with Kingdom of Cochin, another princely state, to form Travancore-Cochin. Rajpramukh became the Governor. The Travancore Tamil Nadu Congress party won 9 or 10 seats in the first Travancore-Cochin assembly election. In the assembly, it supported the Indian National Congress to form a ruling coalition. It withdrew this support after 19 months because of differences with Congress over policy regarding Tamil-speaking parts of the state. In the second assembly election in 1954, TTNC won 12 seats. In the same year, TTNC called for the merger of Tamil-dominated taluks such as Thovalai, Agasteeswaram, Kalkulam, Vilavancode, Neyyatinkara, Shenkottai, Devikulam and Peerumedu with Madras state. In August 1954, a street protest organised by the TTNC in support of these mergers took a violent turn. Police attempting to maintain control opened fire on protesters. Four people were killed and about a dozen sustained injuries.

Following the recommendations of the States Reorganisation Commission, the States Reorganisation Act, 1956 restructured Indian regional jurisdictions. In this process, some Tamil regions (present day Kanyakumari district (Note: Kanyakumari district consists of former Travancore taluks such as Agastheeswaram, Kallkkulam, Thovalai and Vilavancode)) of Travancore-Cochin merged with Madras state (present day Tamil Nadu (Note: Madras state renamed as Tamil Nadu on 14 January 1969)) on 1 November 1956. Other Tamil-majority areas remained in Travancore–Cochin, including Neyyatinkkara South, Nedumangad East, Devikulam and Peerumedu. Following this reorganisation, the Travancore Tamil Nadu Congress successfully fielded a candidate in the Travancore–Cochin state election; once in the Assembly, he lobbied for amalgamation of further Tamil areas into the Tamil Nadu state.

After the merger of the regions, the leaders dissolved the party in 1957 and joined the ruling Congress party.
