= Bharatiya Janata Party – Tamil Nadu =

Tamil Nadu affiliate of the Bharatiya Janata Party

- President: Nainar Nagenthran
- Chairman: Ram Madhav (overseer)
- General Secretary: Ashvathaman Allimuthu; Raama Sreenivasan; Vinoj P. Selvam
- Spokesperson: Narayanan Thirupathy
- Treasurer: S. R. Sekhar
- Founder: Atal Bihari Vajpayee; Lal Krishna Advani; Murli Manohar Joshi; Nanaji Deshmukh; K. R. Malkani; Sikandar Bakht; Vijay Kumar Malhotra; Vijaya Raje Scindia; Bhairon Singh Shekhawat; Shanta Kumar; Ram Jethmalani; Jagannathrao Joshi
- Founded: 6 April 1980 (46 years ago)
- Headquarters: Kamalalayam, 19, Vaidyaraman Street, T. Nagar, Chennai-600017, Tamil Nadu, India
- Youth wing: Bharatiya Janata Yuva Morcha, Tamil Nadu
- Women's wing: BJP Mahila Morcha, Tamil Nadu
- Ideology: Integral humanism; Social conservatism; Tamil nationalism; Economic nationalism; Cultural nationalism; Hindu nationalism
- Colours: Saffron
- Alliance: National Democratic Alliance
- Seats in Rajya Sabha: 0 / 18
- Seats in Lok Sabha: 0 / 39
- Seats in Tamil Nadu Legislative Assembly: 1 / 234

Election symbol

Party flag

Website
- BJP Tamil Nadu

The Bharatiya Janata Party – Tamil Nadu (BJP Tamil Nadu) , also known as the Tamil Nadu BJP, is the affiliate of the Bharatiya Janata Party in the Indian state of Tamil Nadu. The party is based in Chennai and is led by chair Nainar Nagendran.

== History ==
In 1980, K. Narayan Rao became the first state president of BJP Tamil Nadu unit. As per political observers, the 1982 Mandaikadu incident was a turning point, after which Hindu Munnani and later the BJP expanded the base from Kanyakumari District. This led to early electoral gains, including K. V. Balachandran’s 1984 win as an independent with its backing and the BJP’s later victory on its own in Padmanabhapuram Constituency. In Kanyakumari district, the electorate is later divided between Hindus and Christians, with the BJP drawing support largely from Hindus and the Congress backed by many Christians, leaving limited space for the Dravidian majors DMK and AIADMK.

== Electoral performance ==
=== Lok Sabha Elections in Tamil Nadu ===
Election Year	Leader	Alliance	Seats			Popular vote			Sitting side
Election Year	Leader	Alliance	seats contested	seats won	+/- in seats	Votes	votes %	±pp	Sitting side
Lok Sabha Elections Performance in Tamil Nadu
1984	Atal Bihari Vajpayee	None	1	0 / 39	New entry	15,462	0.07%	New entry	Opposition
1989	Lal Krishna Advani	None	3	0 / 39	Steady	76,511	0.29%	▲0.22%	Opposition
1991	Lal Krishna Advani	None	15	0 / 39	Steady	4,06,869	1.65%	▲1.36%	Opposition
1996	Atal Bihari Vajpayee	None	37	0 / 39	Steady	7,95,797	2.93%	▲1.28%	Opposition
1998	Atal Bihari Vajpayee	NDA	5	3 / 39	▲3	17,57,645	6.86%	▲3.93%	Government
1999	Atal Bihari Vajpayee	NDA	6	4 / 39	▲1	17,57,645	7.14%	▲0.28%	Government
2004	Lal Krishna Advani	NDA	6	0 / 39	▼4	14,55,899	5.07%	▼2.10%	Opposition
2009	Lal Krishna Advani	None	18	0 / 39	Steady	17,57,645	2.30%	▼2.77%	Opposition
2014	Narendra Modi	NDA	9	1 / 39	▲1	22,23,566	5.56%	▲3.21%	Government
2019	Narendra Modi	NDA	5	0 / 39	▼1	15,51,924	3.62%	▼1.94%	Government
2024	Narendra Modi	NDA	23	0 / 39	Steady	48,80,954	11.24%	▲7.58%	Government

==== Elected Members to Lok Sabha election in Tamil Nadu ====
Lok Sabha Members in Tamil Nadu
S.No.	Portrait	Name	Election Years	Constituency		Popular Votes				Prime Minister
S.No.	Portrait	Name	Election Years	No.	Name	Votes	Vote %	Margin	Margin %	Prime Minister
2014 Lok Sabha Members in Tamil Nadu
01.		Pon Radhakrishnan (br. 1 March 1952)	2014	39	Kanniyakumari	372,906	37.62%	128,662	12.98%	Narendra Modi
1999 Lok Sabha Members in Tamil Nadu
01.		Master Mathan (br. 19 September 1932 - di. 26 July 2024)	1999	18	Nilgiris	369,828	50.73%	23,959	3.29%	Atal Bihari Vajpayee
02.		C. P. Radhakrishnan (br. 4 May 1957)	1999	20	Coimbatore	430,068	49.21%	54,077	6.19%	Atal Bihari Vajpayee
03.		Rangarajan Kumaramangalam (br. 12 May 1952 - di. 23 August 2000)	1999	27	Tiruchirappalli	377,450	54.61%	89,197	12.90%	Atal Bihari Vajpayee
04.		Pon Radhakrishnan (br. 1 March 1952)	1999	39	Nagercoil	307,319	50.21%	145,643	23.80%	Atal Bihari Vajpayee
1998 Lok Sabha Members in Tamil Nadu
01.		Master Mathan (br. 19 September 1932 - di. 26 July 2024)	1998	18	Nilgiris	322,818	46.49%	60,385	8.69%	Atal Bihari Vajpayee
02.		C. P. Radhakrishnan (br. 4 May 1957)	1998	20	Coimbatore	449,269	55.85%	144,676	17.99%	Atal Bihari Vajpayee
03.		Rangarajan Kumaramangalam (br. 12 May 1952 - di. 23 August 2000)	1998	27	Tiruchirappalli	305,233	48.39%	11,455	1.82%	Atal Bihari Vajpayee

=== Legislative Assembly Elections in Tamil Nadu ===
Election Year	Leader	Alliance	Seats			Popular vote			Result
Election Year	Leader	Alliance	seats contested	seats won	+/- in seats	Votes	votes %	±pp	Result
Legislative Assembly Elections Performance in Tamil Nadu
1980	K. Narayana Rao	None	10	0 / 234	New entry	13,177	0.07%	New entry	Lost
1984	K. Narayana Rao	None	15	0 / 234	Steady	54,390	0.25%	▲0.18%	Lost
1989	K. N. Lakshmanan	None	30	0 / 234	Steady	88,777	0.35%	▲0.10%	Lost
1991	K. N. Lakshmanan	None	99	0 / 234	Steady	4,19,229	1.70%	▲1.35%	Lost
1996	K. N. Lakshmanan	None	143	1 / 234	▲1	4,90,453	1.81%	▲0.11%	Opposition
2001	S. P. Kripanidhi	DMK+	21	4 / 234	▲3	8,95,352	3.19%	▲1.38%	Opposition
2006	C. P. Radhakrishnan	None	225	0 / 234	▼4	6,66,823	2.02%	▼1.17%	Lost
2011	Pon Radhakrishnan	NDA	204	0 / 234	Steady	8,19,577	2.22%	▲0.20%	Lost
2016	Tamilisai Soundararajan	NDA	188	0 / 234	Steady	12,28,692	2.84%	▲0.62%	Lost
2021	L. Murugan	AIADMK+	20	4 / 234	▲4	12,13,670	2.62%	▼0.22%	Opposition
2026	Nainar Nagendran	AIADMK+	33	1 / 234	▼3	14,67,024	2.97%	▲0.35%	Opposition

==== Elected Members to Legislative Assembly election in Tamil Nadu ====
Legislative Assembly Members in Tamil Nadu
S.No.	Portrait	Name	Election Years	Constituency			Popular Votes			
S.No.	Portrait	Name	Election Years	District	No.	Name	Votes	Vote %	Margin	Margin %
2026 Legislative Assembly Members in Tamil Nadu
01.		M. Bhojarajan	2026	Nilgiris	108	Udhagamandalam	48,488	32.61%	976	0.66%
2021 Legislative Assembly Members in Tamil Nadu
01.		Dr. C.K. Saraswathi (br.1945)	2021	Erode	100	Modakkurichi	78,125	42.96%	281	0.15%
02.		Vanathi Srinivasan (br.6 June 1970)	2021	Coimbatore	120	Coimbatore South	53,209	34.38%	1,728	1.12%
03.		Nainar Nagendran (br.16 October 1960)	2021	Tirunelveli	224	Tirunelveli	92,282	46.70%	23,107	11.69%
04.		M. R. Gandhi (br.25 July 1945)	2021	Kanniyakumari	230	Nagercoil	88,804	48.21%	11,669	6.33%
2001 Legislative Assembly Members in Tamil Nadu
01.		K. N. Lakshmanan (br.20 October 1930 - di.1 June 2020)	2001	Chennai	13	Mylapore	60,996	51.09%	6,047	5.06%
02.		K. V. Muralidharan	2001	Dharmapuri	75	Thalli	36,738	38.33%	6,217	6.49%
03.		Jega Veerapandian	2001	Nagapattinam	171	Mayuram	51,303	49.51%	2,452	2.37%
04.		H. Raja (br.29 September 1957)	2001	Sivaganga	195	Karaikudi	54,093	48.40%	1,651	1.47%
1996 Legislative Assembly Members in Tamil Nadu
01.		C. Velayudham	1996	Kanniyakumari	231	Padmanabhapuram	27,443	31.76%	4,540	5.25%

== Leadership ==
=== Current Party Office bearers ===
Member	Party Position	Past elected positions
Nainar Nagendran	Party President	Former cabinet minister in the Government of Tamil Nadu
Khushbu Sundar	Vice-Presidents	
Sasikala Pushpa	Vice-Presidents	Former Rajya Sabha MP from AIADMK
K. P. Ramalingam	Vice-Presidents	Former DMK MP (1996) from Tiruchengode Lok Sabha constituency
V. P. Duraisamy	Vice-Presidents	Former Member of Tamil Nadu Legislative Assembly, Former Deputy Speaker (from DMK)
R. N. Jayaprakash	Vice-Presidents	
Dolphin Sritharan	Vice-Presidents	
R.C. Paul Kanagaraj	Vice-Presidents	
M. Chakravarthy	Vice-Presidents	
P. Kanagasabapathi	Vice-Presidents	
A. G. Sampath	Vice-Presidents	
Ma. Venkatesan	Vice-Presidents	
K. Gopalsamy	Vice-Presidents	
N. Sundar	Vice-Presidents	
S. R. Sekhar	Treasurer	
Dr. Veera Thirunavukkarasu	President, OBC Wing	
Pepsi G. Sivakumar	President, Arts and Culture Wing	
R. Arjunamurthy	President, NGO Wing	

==== Party Secretaries ====
Member	Party Position
Ashvathaman Allimuthu	State Secretaries
Prof. Raama Sreenivasan	State Secretaries
Vinoj P. Selvam	State Secretaries
A. P. Muruganandham	State Secretaries
Karate R. Thiagarajan	State Secretaries
S. Satishkumar	State Secretaries
P. Karthiyayini	State Secretaries
Dr. R. Ananda Priya	State Secretaries
Y.G. Madhuvanthi	Secretary - Intellectual Cell
Selva Kumar	Secretary - Professional Cell
Prasobha Kumar	Organization Secretary
K.T. Raghavan	Organization General Secretary

==== Youth and Women wing ====
Member	Party Position
S. G. Suryah	Youth Wing President
Kavitha Srikanth	Women Wing President
Vithya Ramesh	Women Wing Vice-president

==== Spokesperson of state unit ====
- Narayanan Thirupathy

=== List of presidents ===
S.No	Name	Tenure	Elected year	Ref.
1	K. Narayan Rao (1929–2017)	1980 – 1983	1980	-
2	K. N. Lakshmanan (1930–2020)	1984 – 1989	1984	
3	V. Vijayaraghavalu (unknown)	1990 – 1993	1990	-
4	N. S. Chandra Bose (1932–2010)	1993 – 1995	1993	-
(2)	K. N. Lakshmanan (1930–2020)	1996 – 2000	1996	-
5	S. P. Kirubanidhi (1927–2017)	6 May 2000 – 12 May 2003	2000	-
6	C. P. Radhakrishnan (b. 1957)	12 May 2003 – 22 September 2006	2003	
7	La Ganesan (1945–2025)	22 September 2006 – 30 December 2009	2006	
8	Pon Radhakrishnan (b. 1952)	30 December 2009 – 27 May 2014	2009	
8	Pon Radhakrishnan (b. 1952)	30 December 2009 – 27 May 2014	2012	
9	Tamilisai Soundararajan (b. 1961)	16 August 2014 – 1 September 2019	2014	
9	Tamilisai Soundararajan (b. 1961)	16 August 2014 – 1 September 2019	2016	
10	L. Murugan (b. 1977)	11 March 2020 – 7 July 2021	2020	
11	K. Annamalai (b. 1984)	8 July 2021 – 12 April 2025	2021	
12	Nainar Nagendran (b. 1960)	12 April 2025 – Incumbent	2025	

== See also ==
- Pattali Makkal Katchi
- Tamil Maanila Congress
