= J. Helen Davidson =

Indian politician

Member of the Indian Parliament for Kanyakumari
- In office 2009–2014
- Preceded by: A. V. Bellarmin
- Succeeded by: Pon Radhakrishnan

Personal details
- Born: 18 July 1971 (age 55)
- Party: Dravida Munnetra Kazhagam
- Spouse: Davidson
- Education: Holy Cross College, Nagercoil
- Occupation: Politician

J. Helen Davidson, is an Indian politician who was elected from Kanyakumari constituency, out of 15 Lok Sabha as a Dravida Munnetra Kazhagam candidate in 2009 election. Helen Davidson was a teacher who had a bachelor's degree in Science and belongs to the Christian Nadar community. She was the first female Member of Parliament to represent Kanyakumary Loksabha Constituency. She married Davidson in 1993. Helen belongs to Dravida Munnetra Kazhagam and her family is responsible for the growth of DMK in Kanyakumari District.

== Education ==
Helen Davidson schooled from Little Flower Girls Higher Secondary School, Nagercoil. She obtained her bachelor's degree from Holy Cross College, Nagercoil. Upon her graduation, she had a masters degree from Vivekananda College, Agastheeswaram and a Bachelor's degree in Education from Annamalai University.
