= C. Velayudham =

Indian politician (died 2024)

Member of Tamil Nadu Legislative Assembly
- In office 10 May 1996 – 14 May 2001
- Preceded by: K. Lawrence
- Succeeded by: K. P. Rajendra Prasad
- Constituency: Padmanabhapuram

Personal details
- Died: 8 May 2024 Tamil Nadu, India

C. Velayudham (1950–51 — 8 May 2024) was an Indian politician. He was elected to the Tamil Nadu legislative assembly from Padmanabhapuram constituency in 1996 election. Velayudham was the first Bharatiya Janata Party candidate ever elected to Tamil Nadu assembly. He died on 8 May 2024.
