= Pon Radhakrishnan =

Indian politician

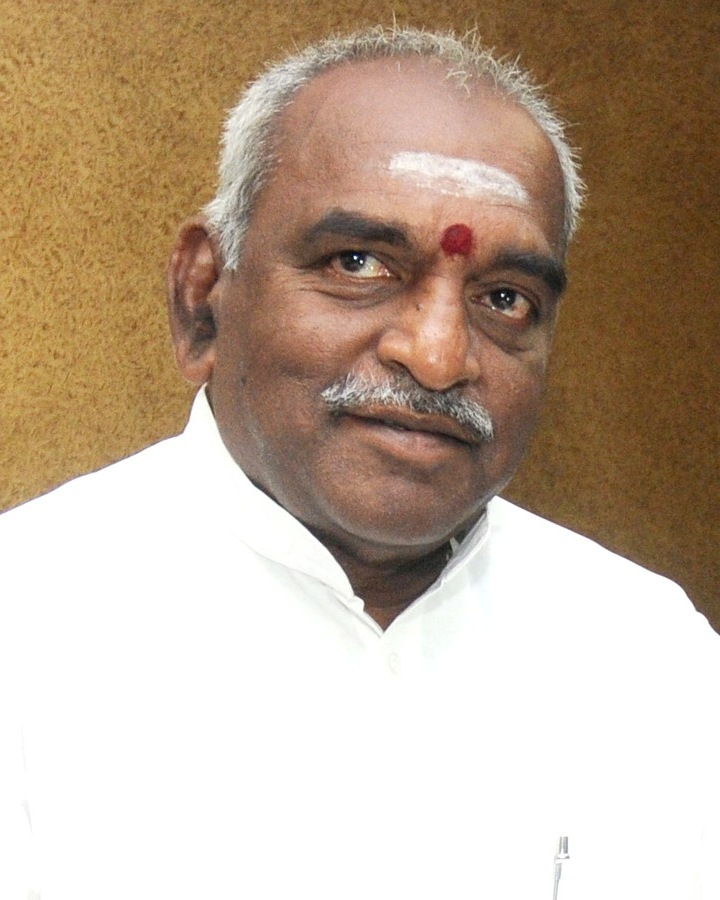

Minister of State for Finance
- In office 3 September 2017 – 24 May 2019
- Prime Minister: Narendra Modi
- Minister: Arun Jaitley
- Preceded by: Arjun Ram Meghwal
- Succeeded by: Anurag Thakur

Minister of State for Road Transport and Highways
- In office 9 November 2014 – 3 September 2017
- Prime Minister: Narendra Modi
- Minister: Nitin Gadkari
- Preceded by: Krishan Pal Gurjar
- Succeeded by: V. K. Singh
- In office 8 September 2003 – 22 May 2004
- Prime Minister: Atal Bihari Vajpayee
- Minister: B. C. Khanduri
- Preceded by: Shripad Naik
- Succeeded by: K. H. Muniyappa

Minister of State for Shipping
- In office 9 November 2014 – 24 May 2019
- Prime Minister: Narendra Modi
- Minister: Nitin Gadkari
- Preceded by: Krishan Pal Gurjar
- Succeeded by: Mansukh L. Mandaviya (as MoS Independent charge)

Member of the Indian Parliament for Kanyakumari
- In office 5 June 2014 – 18 June 2019
- Preceded by: J. Helen Davidson
- Succeeded by: H. Vasanthakumar

Member of the Indian Parliament for Nagercoil
- In office 6 October 1999 – 16 May 2004
- Preceded by: N. Dennis
- Succeeded by: A. V. Bellarmin

9th President of Bharatiya Janata Party, Tamil Nadu
- In office 30 December 2009 – 27 May 2014
- Preceded by: La. Ganesan
- Succeeded by: Tamilisai Soundararajan

Personal details
- Born: 1 March 1952 (age 74) Nagercoil, Travancore-Cochin, India (now in Tamil Nadu, India)
- Party: Bharatiya Janata Party
- Education: Scott Christian College, Dr. Ambedkar Government Law College, Chennai
- Profession: Lawyer, Politician

Ponnaya Ayyappan Radhakrishnan (born 1 March 1952) is an Indian politician representing the Bharatiya Janata Party. He was the Minister of State in the Ministry of Finance and Ministry of Shipping between May 2014 and May 2019. Earlier, he served as the Union Minister of State for Road Transport & Highways in the NDA government. He has also served as the Minister of State for Youth affairs and Minister of State in the Ministry of Housing and Urban Poverty Alleviation in Third Vajpayee Ministry. He was elected to Lok Sabha from Kanyakumari in Tamil Nadu in 2014. He lost in the recent 2019, 2021 (by-election) and 2024 parliamentary elections.

== Personal life ==
Radhakrishnan was born on March 1, 1952, in Alanthangarai village, Kanyakumari district to his father Ponnaya Ayyappan and mother Thangakani into a traditional Congress family, Radhakrishnan holds a BL Degree from Government Law College, Chennai.

== Political career ==
=== Early political career ===
After Kamaraj's demise, some of Radhakrishnan's family members joined the Janata Party. Radhakrishnan's brother Ramakrishnan joined the Hindu nationalist Jana Sangh and took charge as the district chairman. Radhakrishnan's uncle Chidambaram Athiswami Nadar contested and won the Colachal constituency in the 1977 elections on behalf of the Janata Party. In 1981, Radhakrishnan joined a Rashtriya Swayamsevak Sangh (RSS) and later became its secretary. Later, Radhakrishnan's father Ponnaya Ayyappan was elected as the District President of Vishwa Hindu Parishad (VHP).

Radhakrishnan joined the Hindu Munnani which was started in 1980, began to grow slowly in the Kanyakumari district. He traveled with its founder Rama Gopalan throughout Tamil Nadu for about a year as his assistant. He also worked as a co-organizer of the Hindu Munnani in the state.

Radhakrishnan contested the Lok Sabha elections in Nagercoil for the first time in the 1991 elections. Despite being in the Hindu Munnani at the time, he contested as a BJP candidate and got 1 lakh 2 thousand 29 votes.

=== As minister and political career (2003-2009) ===
Pon Radhakrishnan won the 1999 Lok Sabha election from Nagercoil constituency and became Minister of State for Youth Affairs in the Atal Bihari Vajpayee-led NDA government of 1999–2004. Later, he also served as Minister of State for Urban Development and Poverty Alleviation.

Radhakrishnan was defeated by a CPI (M) candidate in the Nagercoil Lok Sabha constituency in 2004, and in 2009, he was beaten by a DMK candidate in Kanniyakumari Lok Sabha constituency.

=== As minister and political career (2009-2019) ===
He was president of Tamil Nadu state unit of the Bharatiya Janata Party, resigning the position when he became a Minister of State in the Narendra Modi-led government. He had won in a Lok Sabha seat in the 2014 Indian general election, from Kanyakumari constituency by a margin of 1,28,662 votes. During this tenure, he served as Minister of State in various portfolios like Heavy Industries, Shipping and Finance.

=== Politics (2019-present) ===
In September 2019, Radhakrishnan created a controversy after calling Tamil people as 'ungrateful'. He explained that the Tamil people failed to celebrate Modi after he praised the Tamil language. Later he claimed that he did not call all Tamils as ungrateful and only those doing politics with the language.

Pon. Radhakrishnan participated in a BJP rally in support of Citizenship (Amendment) Act, 2019 in Nagercoil in March 2020 where he spoke of chasing away Christian priests from the district. Many demanded that action be taken against Pon. Radhakrishnan for his communal speech which can incite violence. Police complaints were also filed against him.

Fishermen in Kanniyakumari claimed that around 40,000 - 45,000 fishermen votes in the 48 coastal hamlets in Kanyakumari Lok Sabha constituency was deliberately removed from the electoral-list out of fear that the fishermen would vote against the lone BJP Union minister, Pon Radhakrishnan, contesting in the constituency during the 2019 Lok sabha elections. The coastal fishermen also complained that votes of inland fishermen in another 68 villages also have been removed purposely. They also alleged that their names were removed only a few days before the day of polling.

He lost the Lok Sabha elections in 2019 by a margin of 2.59 lakh votes to H. Vasanthakumar from Indian National Congress.

After the death of Vasanthakumar, he again contested in 2021 Lok Sabha by-election. But he was defeated by a margin of 1,37,950 votes by Vijay Vasanth who is the son of late Vasanthakumar. He again contested in 2024 election and lost again.

== Political views ==
Pon Radhakrishnan claimed in 2018 that the #MeToo movement was launched by "people with perverted minds" and questioned if it was appropriate to make charges about occurrences that took place years ago. He claimed it "corrupts the purity of our land and honor of women" and said it is not a good thing. He also questioned the fairness of "if someone made such an allegation about an incident when playing together in Class 5" and asked whether it would be appropriate for men to begin levelling similar allegations against women.

Radhakrishnan in 2019 asked Tamil people to study Hindi and Sanskrit. He said that could not learn Sanskrit for various reasons and that he was ashamed of it. He also said that Sanskrit and Tamil are equal. He also urged parents to let their children to learn Sanskrit.

== Electoral career ==
=== Lok Sabha ===
Year	Constituency	Party	Result	%	Opponent	Opponent Party	Opponent %	Margin
1991	Nagercoil	BJP	Lost	18.82	N. Dennis	INC	51.60	-32.78
1996	Nagercoil	BJP	Lost	30.25	N. Dennis	TMC(M)	35.18	-4.93
1998	Nagercoil	BJP	Lost	45.08	N. Dennis	TMC(M)	50.00	-4.92
1999	Nagercoil	BJP	Won	50.21	N. Dennis	INC	26.41	+23.80
2004	Nagercoil	BJP	Lost	36.49	A. V. Bellarmin	CPI(M)	60.88	-24.39
2009	Kanniyakumari	BJP	Lost	33.24	J. Helen Davidson	DMK	41.81	-8.57
2014	Kanniyakumari	BJP	Won	37.62	H. Vasanthakumar	INC	24.64	+12.98
2019	Kanniyakumari	BJP	Lost	35.00	H. Vasanthakumar	INC	59.77	-24.77
2021 (By-election)	Kanniyakumari	BJP	Lost	39.92	Vijay Vasanth	INC	52.50	-12.58
2024	Kanniyakumari	BJP	Lost	33.24	Vijay Vasanth	INC	53.06	-19.82

=== Tamil Nadu Legislative Assembly Elections Contested ===
Year	Constituency	Party	Result	%	Opponent	Opponent Party	Opponent %	Margin
2011	Nagercoil	BJP	Lost	22.87	A. Nanjil Murugesan	AIADMK	40.01	-17.14

== Positions ==
- 1999 - Elected to 13th Lok Sabha.
- 1999 to 2000 - Member, Standing Committee on Industry.
- 2000 - Member, Consultative Committee, Ministry of Surface Transport.
- 2000 to 2003 - Minister of State, Ministry of Youth Affairs and Sports.
- 2003 - Minister of State, Ministry of Urban Development and Poverty Alleviation.
- 2003 - Minister of State, Ministry of Road Transport and Highways.
- 2014 - Re-elected to 16th Lok Sabha (2nd term).
- 2014 - Minister of State, Heavy Industries and Public Enterprises
- 2014 to 2017- Minister of State, Ministry of Road Transport and Highways and Ministry of Shipping
- 2017 to 2019 - Minister of State, Ministry of Finance and Ministry of Shipping
