= M. A. Khaleelur Rahman =

Indian politician

M. A. Khaleelur Rahman was elected to the Tamil Nadu Legislative Assembly from the Aravakurichi constituency in the 2006 election. He was a candidate of the Indian Union Muslim League (IUML) party.

== Electoral performance ==
Election	Constituency	Political party	Result	Vote %	Opposition			Ref
Election	Constituency	Political party	Result	Vote %	Candidate	Political party	Vote %	Ref
2006	Aravakurichi	DMK	Won	45.60%	P. Monjanur Ramasamy	MDMK	42.80%	
