= K. Annamalai =

Indian politician and former IPS Police Officer

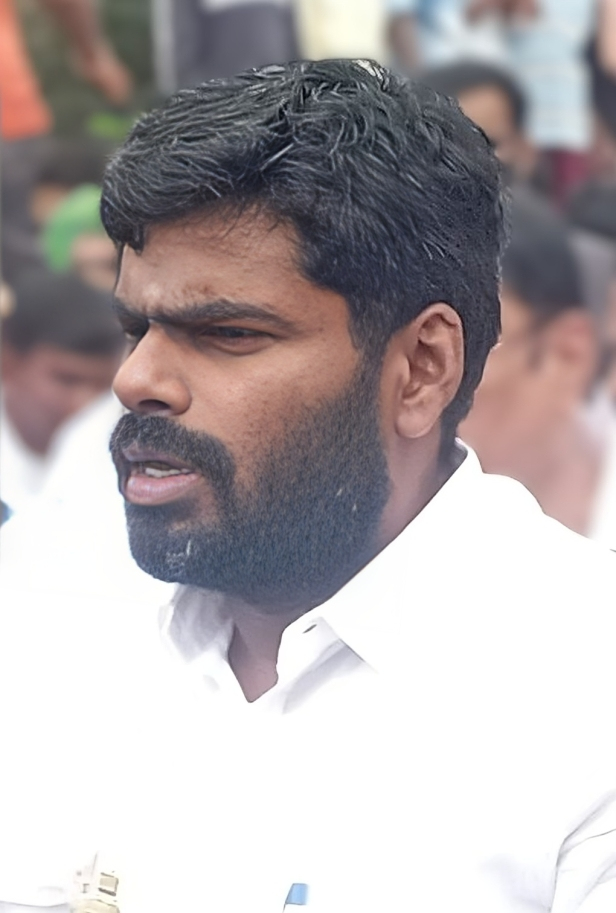
- Annamalai in 2024

Chief servant of We the Leaders Foundation
- Incumbent
- Assumed office March 2020

President of the Bharatiya Janata Party – Tamil Nadu
- In office 16 July 2021 – 11 April 2025
- National President: J. P. Nadda
- Preceded by: L. Murugan
- Succeeded by: Nainar Nagendran

Vice President of the Bharatiya Janata Party – Tamil Nadu
- In office 29 August 2020 – 16 July 2021
- National President: J. P. Nadda
- State President: L. Murugan

Personal details
- Born: Siva Senthil Kumar; 4 June 1984 (age 42) Thottampatti, Karur, Tamil Nadu, India
- Party: TBA (We the Leaders Foundation to be converted to a political party in future)
- Other political affiliations: Bharatiya Janata Party (2020–2026); Desiya Murpokku Dravida Kazhagam (2009, internship)
- Spouse: Akhila Swaminathan (m. 2011)
- Children: 2
- Education: PSG College of Technology (BE); Indian Institute of Management Lucknow (PGDM)
- Occupations: Indian Police Service (voluntary retirement); Politician; Farmer; Social worker
- Police career
- Country: India
- Allegiance: Indian Police Service
- Department: Karnataka State Police
- Service years: 2011–2019
- Rank: Assistant Superintendent of Police Year I (Probationer); Assistant Superintendent of Police Year II (Probationer); Assistant Superintendent of Police; Superintendent of Police; Deputy Commissioner of Police
- Batch: 2011
- Cadre: Karnataka

Annamalai Kuppusamy (born Siva Senthil Kumar; 4 June 1984), commonly known as K. Annamalai, is an Indian politician and former Indian Police Service officer employed with the Karnataka State Police from 2011 until his resignation in 2019. He is currently the chief servant of We The Leaders NGO. As former member of Bharatiya Janata Party (BJP), he served as the state president of the BJP - Tamil Nadu from July 2021 to April 2025, during which he became known for rising visibility and prominence of the party in the state. He unsuccessfully contested the 2021 Tamil Nadu Legislative Assembly election from Aravakurichi and 2024 Lok Sabha election from Coimbatore. He formally resigned from BJP on 5 June 2026.

== Early life and education ==
Annamalai was born as Siva Senthil Kumar in a Tamil family to Kuppusamy and Parameshwari on 4 June 1984 in Thottampatti village of Karur district, Tamil Nadu. He belongs to the Gounder community, whose family has been involved in agriculture. He adopted the name 'Annamalai' when he was studying class 10, as his original name was considered lengthy, with the need for shorter name. He graduated in Mechanical Engineering from PSG College of Technology, Coimbatore, and completed his Master of Business Administration in the Indian Institute of Management, Lucknow. While studying at IIM, Annamalai undertook a political internship in 2009 with the Desiya Murpokku Dravida Kazhagam, gaining early exposure to electoral politics.

== Civil service career ==
In 2011, he cleared the Civil Services Examination conducted by the Union Public Service Commission. Annamalai joined the Indian Police Service (IPS) in the 2011 batch under the Karnataka cadre. Initially serving as Assistant Superintendent of Police (ASP) in Karkala subdivision from 2013, four police stations under his jurisdiction - Karkala Town, Karkala Rural, Padubidri and Kaup received ISO 9001:2008 certification. He later served as Superintendent of Police in the Udupi and Chikkamagaluru districts around 2015-16, and was subsequently posted as Deputy Commissioner of Police (South), Bengaluru under Bengaluru City Police in October 2018.

During his tenure in Udupi, Annamalai gained public attention for his crime-control measures. He also conducted awareness programmes in educational institutions on drug abuse, road safety, and introduced policing measures in Manipal in Udupi district to curb illegal activities. During his tenure in Chikkamagaluru, Annamalai oversaw security arrangements, law-and-order measures during the sensitive Datta Jayanti celebrations at the disputed Baba Budangiri shrine, amid communal tensions in the district. According to a report by Times Now, his supporters often compared him to fictional police character 'Duraisingam' from the blockbuster film Singam, earning him the nickname "Singham" (transl. Lion) due to his policing style. He resigned from IPS in May 2019 while serving as Deputy Commissioner of Police (South), Bengaluru.

== Political career ==
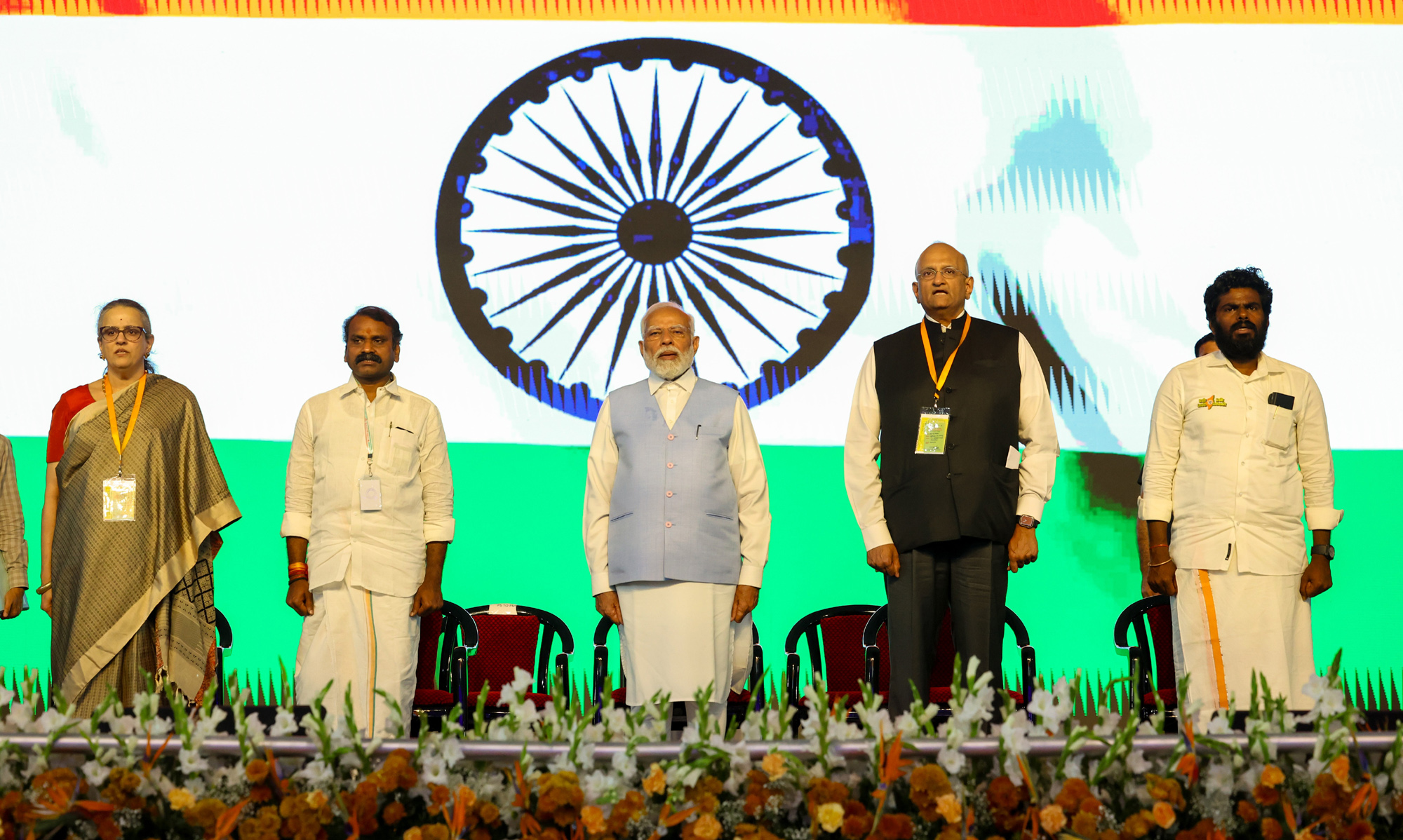
Annamalai (far right) with PM Narendra Modi at an 2024 event in Madurai

Before joining BJP, Annamalai was contacted by actor Rajinikanth, who invited him to join his proposed political venture. He declined the offer as he had already committed to join Bharatiya Janata Party, and in August 2020 Annamalai joined the party, in the presence of party's General Secretary B. L. Santhosh and the then state president L. Murugan. He was appointed a Vice-President of the BJP Tamil Nadu unit within weeks of joining the party. On 8 July 2021, he was appointed the President of BJP's Tamil Nadu unit, succeeding L. Murugan.

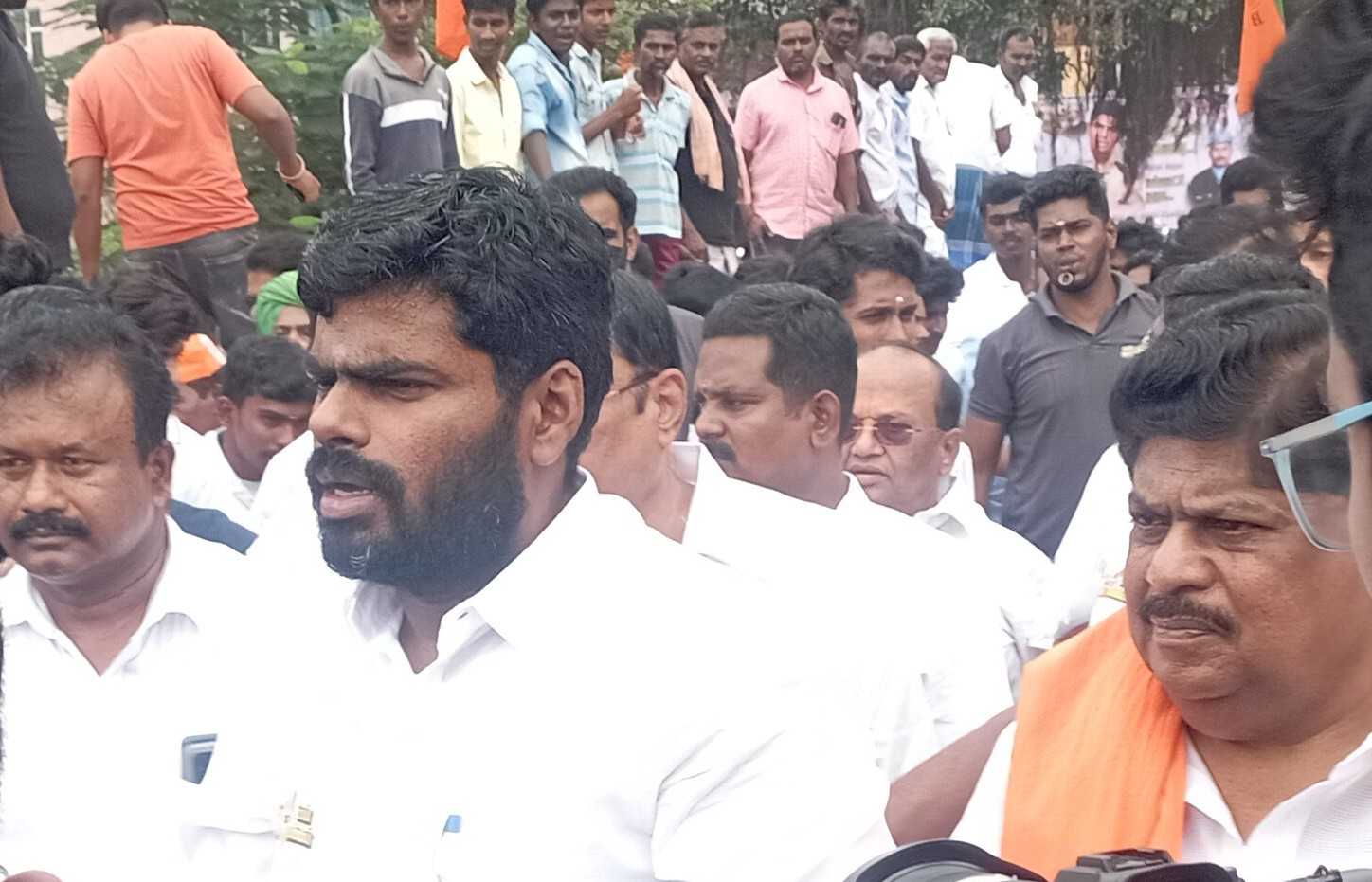
Annamalai (centre) during 'En Mann, En Makkal' padayatra at Omalur

His tenure as state president coincided with an increased visibility of the BJP in Tamil Nadu's political discourse, even as the party continued to face electoral setbacks in the state. In July 2023, Annamalai launched the "En Mann, En Makkal" (transl. Our soil, our people) padayatra with the aim of visiting all of the legislative assembly constituencies in Tamil Nadu, which culminated in February 2024 with an event attended by Narendra Modi. He stepped down from the post of state unit president in April 2025.

=== Political positions and disputes ===
Taking on the ruling Dravida Munnetra Kazhagam (DMK) over corruption, Annamalai released a series of audio recordings as DMK Files, which showed statements linking senior DMK figures, including ex-finance minister Palanivel Thiaga Rajan and relatives of CM M. K. Stalin to large-scale financial misconduct, and also corruption cases on DMK ministers such as Senthil Balaji and K. Ponmudy, making the party file defamation cases against him. The DMK issued a legal notice to Annamalai seeking an unconditional apology and ₹500 crore in damages, alleging that his statements were false, laughable, defamatory, to gain personal and political mileage without any basis or evidence. Despite the allegations in the DMK Files there is no credible report or official record of an FIR, ED/CBI inquiry, or prosecution launched against DMK leaders specifically in relation to the allegations outlined by Annamalai.

In March 2023, a case was registered by the Tamil Nadu Police's cyber crime wing against Annamalai in connection with his social media post alleging attacks on North Indian migrant workers in Tamil Nadu under DMK government. Later, the Tamil Nadu and Bihar governments stated that the reports of attacks were unfounded and cautioned against the circulation of misinformation by him.

During his tenure as president, Annamalai's repeated remarks on alliance party AIADMK's ideology and its leaders, including C. N. Annadurai and J. Jayalalithaa, caused the AIADMK to withdraw from the BJP-led National Democratic Alliance (NDA) in September 2023. In the 2024 Indian general election in Tamil Nadu, the BJP, under the leadership of Annamalai, formed a NDA-lead alliance with the Pattali Makkal Katchi, Tamil Maanila Congress, and Amma Makkal Munnetra Kazhagam, and contested the election. The alliance did not win any of the 39 Lok Sabha seats in the state. Annamalai, who contested from the Coimbatore constituency, was defeated by a margin of approximately 110,000 votes.

Following defeats of both parties in 2024 Indian general election, the AIADMK leaders maintained that Annamalai's approach towards alliance partners had led to the defeats. On 26 August 2024, Annamalai criticized Edappadi K. Palaniswami, the general secretary of the AIADMK, referring to him as "illiterate" and alleging that he had emerged as the AIADMK Legislature Party leader in 2017 as the "highest bidder". According to an article by Deccan Herald, relations between the AIADMK and the BJP had significantly deteriorated during Annamalai's leadership.

Supporters within party have credited Annamalai as expanding the party's activity in the state dominated by Dravidian parties, while former allies have argued that it strained coalition relationships. Political analysts noted that Annamalai's leadership was inclined on pursuing independent growth for BJP rather than relying on alliances.

=== Public protests ===
During protests following the 2024 Anna University sexual assault case, Annamalai engaged in act of self-flagellation as a form of protest, drawing public and media attention to concerns over law and order under DMK. He vowed to remove DMK from power and took an oath to abstain from wearing footwear and to fast for 48 days until the ruling DMK is removed from power. On 13 April 2026, following the request of the new BJP state president and his successor, Nainar Nagendran, he resumed wearing footwear.

=== Post-presidency activities ===
In April 2025, Annamalai was changed from state president post with reports that the decision was taken by the BJP to mend ties with AIADMK. Reportedly, Palaniswami set, as a precondition for alliance discussions ahead of the 2026 Tamil Nadu Legislative Assembly election, the removal of Annamalai from his position, citing his criticism of the AIADMK prior to the talks with the BJP. He was succeeded by Nainar Nagendran, who was former AIADMK minister. He continued to make public statements and participate in party activities. He criticises DMK on issues of law and order deterioration.

For 2026 Tamil Nadu Legislative Assembly election, Annamalai was assigned BJP's incharge for six constituencies, but later stepped down due to personal reasons. During the seat-sharing arrangements, he expressed strong displeasure to the party's national leadership over the constituencies allotted by the AIADMK. On April 4, 2026, while addressing reporters in Chennai, Annamalai said he had already decided not to contest the election and had informed the party's core committee in advance. He clarified that the decision was his own and not due to being denied a ticket and added that he would campaign for NDA alliance candidates across Tamil Nadu.

=== Resignation from BJP and new political movement ===
On 5 June 2026, Annamalai resigned from the primary membership of the Bharatiya Janata Party after meeting BJP national president Nitin Nabin and Home minister Amit Shah on 2 June in New Delhi. Following his resignation, he plans to expand We The Leaders, a grassroots non-profit NGO for leadership training & social activities, into a political movement, stating that it would contest future elections. He also announced the establishment of A. P. J. Abdul Kalam Centre for Ethics and Politics to train and prepare members for political leadership.

== International engagements ==
As Tamil Nadu BJP president, Annamalai participated in several international political and diaspora-related events. He visited Sri Lanka in 2022 and 2023, where he met with Sri Lankan lawmakers, Ceylon Tamils, representatives of NGOs and political leaders. During these visits, he insisted upon India's position on the implementation of the Thirteenth Amendment to the Sri Lankan Constitution and raised concerns related to the welfare of Tamil communities.

In 2023, Annamalai took part in the Young Leaders Forum: UK-India Week 2023, organized by the India Global Forum at The Nehru Centre, London for promoting India–UK bilateral ties. He also led a four-member delegation from BJP in India, participating in BRICS Political Parties Plus Dialogue Summit (BRICS-PPPDS) held at Johannesburg, South Africa.

In 2024, Annamalai attended the Chevening Fellowship programme for Leadership and Excellence at University of Oxford's Department of Politics and International Relations.

In 2025 and 2026, Annamalai attended the Stanford India Conference at Stanford University in the United States, where he participated as a speaker along with Lok Sabha MPs Tejasvi Surya and Shashi Tharoor in discussions on India–US relations and public policy.

== Elections contested ==
Elections	Lok Sabha	Constituency	Political party	Result	Vote percentage	Opposition		
Elections	Lok Sabha	Constituency	Political party	Result	Vote percentage	Candidate	Political party	Vote percentage
2024	18th	Coimbatore	BJP	Lost	32.79%	Ganapathi P. Rajkumar	DMK	41.39%

Elections	Tamil Nadu Legislative Assembly	Constituency	Political party	Result	Vote percentage	Opposition		
Elections	Tamil Nadu Legislative Assembly	Constituency	Political party	Result	Vote percentage	Candidate	Political party	Vote percentage
2021	16th	Aravakurichi	BJP	Lost	38.71%	R. Elango	DMK	52.72%

== Personal life ==
Annamalai is married to Akhila Swaminathan, and they have two children: a son (Arjun) and a daughter (Aradhana). His interests were in organic farming, and to pursue an agrarian lifestyle before entering politics. He has described reading as one of his preferred leisure activities. He was also associated with establishment of initiatives such as "We the Leaders" Foundation, which he expanded into political movement post-resignation from BJP.

=== Luxury watch purchase ===
On 22 December 2022, Annamalai faced criticism from political opponents over a luxury "Rafale" special edition wristwatch reportedly worth over ₹5 lakh. Critics questioned how he could afford the watch, sought proof of purchase, and also raised concerns over his references to nationalism given that the watch was manufactured in France. After four months, in April 2023, Annamalai released a purchase bill for the watch.

=== Land purchase ===
In July 2025, K. Annamalai purchased agricultural land near Coimbatore, reported to be up to 14 acres (5.7 ha). Political opponents alleged that the property was registered at the government guideline value rather than the higher market value. Annamalai denied any wrongdoing, stating that the purchase was funded through personal savings and loans, and that applicable stamp duty and registration charges, reported to be over ₹40 lakh, were duly paid.

=== Religious views ===
Annamalai has described Hinduism or Sanatana Dharma as "a way of life" that has existed for millennia, he also rejected the claim that Hinduism emerged as a religious identity only during the British rule. He also argued that the diversity of Hindu traditions and forms of worship predates the modern definition of Hinduism.

== Other appearances ==
Year	Film	Language	Role	Notes
2024	Arabbie	Kannada	Swimming coach	Cameo appearance

== Bibliography ==
- Stepping Beyond Khaki: Revelations of a Real-Life Singham. Bloomsbury. 18 January 2021. ISBN 978-93-8944-987-7.
- Unfinished Hope: A Political and Governance Book on Indian Democracy, Public Institutions, Civic Action and Nation-Building. Penguin Books. 30 October 2026. ISBN 978-93-7730-372-3.
