= P. Thanulinga Nadar =

Indian politician (1915–1988)

Paramarthalinga Thanulinga Nadar

Member of Parliament (Lok Sabha) for Nagercoil
- In office 1957–1962

Personal details
- Born: 17 February 1915
- Died: 2 November 1988 (aged 73)
- Party: Hindu Munnani, Indian National Congress, Travancore Tamil Nadu Congress
- Profession: Politician

Paramarthalinga Thanulinga Nadar (17 February 1915 – 2 November 1988), also known simply as Thanulingam, was an Indian politician, Tamil Nadu Ellai Poratta Thyagi, and a staunch member of the now defunct Travancore Tamil Nadu Congress and would later emerge as a right-wing activist in the State. He served as a Member of Parliament with the Indian National Congress. In his later life, he served as the State President of the Hindu Munnani and played an active role in furthering Hindutva in the Indian State of Tamil Nadu in the 1980s.

== Early life ==
Thanulinga Nadar was born on 17 February 1915 to M. Paramarthalinga Nadar in Thiruvananthapuram District (in the area comprised in present-day Kanyakumari District of Tamil Nadu State) of the Travancore kingdom. His parents belonged to the Nadar community of southern Travancore. His father fought against British rule. Thanulingam graduated in arts and law he was one of the active member of Marshall A.Nesamony's Travancore Tamil Nad Congress Movement. This led him in active politics.

== Movement for the merger of Tamil regions of Travancore State with adjacent Madras State ==
Thiru.P.Thanulingam Nadar is the descendant of Thanumalaya Perumal Marachan family. This Marachan family provided asylum for the Travancore Prince Marthanda Varma during his tumultuous kingship struggle erupted in 1729 AD from the powerful Nair feudal lords called Ettuveetu Pillaimar.

When the Kumari Thanthai Marshal A.Nesamony founded Travancore Tamil Nad Congress Party on 8 September 1947 for the cause of merger of Tamil regions of erstwhile Travancore State to the adjacent Madras State on the basis of shared Tamil identity, the young Thiru.P.Thanulingam Nadar joined the movement and worked hard for the welfare of the same. When Travancore Representative Body elections conducted in 1948 for drafting the constitution for Travancore State, he was elected in Agasteeswaram Constituency from Travancore Tamil Nad Congress Party and defeated TTNC's arch rival political party of Pattom Thanu pillai's Travancore State Congress. In that Travancore Representative Body election-1948, Travancore Tamil Nad Congress Party stood as principal opposition party and its leader Marshal A.Nesamony served as leader of opposition.

Later in 1950, he started a new political party called the Tamil Nad Congress Party, T.P. for the cause of merger of Tamil Speaking regions of the then The United State of Travancore and Cochin with adjacent Madras State on the basis of shared Tamil identity as like his parental party, T.T.N.C. His Tamil Nad Congress Party had the joint general secretaries of T. T. Daniel (his relative) and P. S. Mony. He contested in Nagercoil parliamentary constituency as candidate of Tamil Nad Congress Party in first lok sabha election 1951 against T.T.N.C., and Socialist Party, S.P. and failed to get through. Later, he annexed his party with parental Travancore Tamil Nad Congress Party for preserving the unity of Tamil cause in Travancore Princely State. During the 1954 Travancore-Cochin State election, he fought in Agasteeswaram constituency as candidate of Travancore Tamil Nad Congress Party against Praja Socialist Part and INC and won the election. He, Ponnappan Nadar and Chithambara Nathan Nadar collectively joined hands with Marshal Nesamony as fellow TTNCians for the merger of Tamil areas with Madras State. His speech in Travancore Assembly is very famous and showed his love with Tamil. He usually had the habit of telling small stories during the Travancore assembly speech. One time he told in the Thiru-Kochi assembly that Mother Tongue is living soul of the human body.

He loved his senior and mentor Kumari Thanthi Marshal A. Nesamony very much since Nesamony was 20 years elder than him. During 1982, when there was a debate for naming Kanyakumari Transport Corporation by the name of Nesamony or Jeeva, he stick with Nesamony's name. His love towards his senior Marshal. A. Nesamony was evident from the fact that he was the Patron for the statue erection committee of Marshal A. Nesamony in front of Meenatchipuram Anna Bus Stand.

After accomplishing the merger task, TTNC Party merged with INC party in the presence of Thiru. K. Kamaraj Nadar on 26 January 1957. He was elected as M.P. from Kanniyakumari constituency from INC Party. After that, he served as Rajya Sabha M.P. from 1964 to 1968 from INC Party.

== Political career ==
Thanulinga Nadar joined the Indian Independence movement at the young stage. Later, he joined the Travancore Tamil Nad Congress Movement founded by Marshal A. Nesamony. After the merger in 1956, he was a close associate of K. Kamaraj.

He participated in the 1948 Travancore Representative Body elections of the Travancore State and was elected to the assembly. He secured third place in the 1951 elections, the first held as a part of the Republic of India. However, he contested the 1954 elections from Agastisvaram and was elected by a margin of 6,721 votes. He served as a member of M.L.A. till 1956 when southern Travancore became a part of Madras state.

In 1957, Thanulingam was elected to the Lok Sabha from Nagercoil from INC ticket. He served as a Member of Parliament till 1962.

Thanulingam was elected to the Rajya Sabha in 1964 and served as a member of the Rajya Sabha from 9 July 1964 to 2 April 1968.

Thanulinga Nadar was a devout Hindu. Even during the 1940s and 1950s, he bitterly differed with fellow Congressman from Kanyakumari district, A. Nesamony who was a Christian Nadar. The differences led to the birth of two different factions in the state in the early 1950s which required the intervention of K. Kamaraj, the then President of Tamil Nadu Congress Committee. Many Hindus embraced Christianity in Kanyakumari district due to caste oppression by Hindu uppercastes; Thanulingam, who identified with the Hindu cause, strongly opposed the conversions. In the early 1980s, he joined the Hindu right wing organisation Hindu Munnani and soon became its State President. During the visit of M.G.R. to Mandikadu, Thanulingam Nadar met him and apprised the situation to him to defuse the crisis. He advised Shiv Sena founder and supremo Bal Thackeray to shelve the hatred policy towards Tamilians staying in Maharashtra State. Thanulingam was arrested along with other top Hindu Munnani leaders on 12 February 1983, as a preemptive measure to prevent Hindu-Christian clashes.

== Death ==
Thanulingam Nadar died on 2 November 1988 at the age of 73 while he was addressing a public rally in Eral, Thirunelveli district.

== Family ==
Thanulingam married Nakshetram Ammal at an early age. She died due to diseases and he married a second time, this time to Ramanayagam Ammal. Thanulingam has two sons(Noble) and three daughters.
