= Pushpa Leela Alban =

Indian politician

Dr. Pushpa Leela Alban
- In office 2011–2016
- Constituency: Padmanabapuram

Personal details
- Party: Dravida Munnetra Kazhagam

Dr. Pushpa Leela Alban is an Indian politician and incumbent member of the Tamil Nadu Legislative Assembly from the Padmanabapuram constituency. She represents the Dravida Munnetra Kazhagam party.
