= Naveen Raja Jacob =

Indian volleyball player (born 1989)

Naveen Jacob

Personal information
- Full name: Manidurai Naveen Raja Jacob
- Born: 10 January 1989 (age 37); Sundankottai, Thoothukudi, Tamil Nadu
- Height: 187 cm (6 ft 2 in)
- Weight: 87 kg (192 lb)
- Spike: 340 cm (130 in)
- Block: 322 cm (127 in)

Volleyball information
- Position: Attacker/Libero
- Current club: IOB, Chennai Blitz
- Number: 18

Career
Teams
	IOB, Chennai Spartans, Chennai Blitz

National team
2007 - Present	India

Manidurai Naveen Raja Jacob (born 10 January 1989), known as Naveen is an integral part of current India men's national volleyball team. He currently plays for Chennai Blitz in Prime Volleyball League.

== Early life ==
Manidurai Naveen Raja Jacob was born on January 10, 1989, at Sundankottai village, Thoothukudi district, Tamil Nadu. Having noticed by his brother with a talent for volleyball, he started playing from 2003. On 2007, he got national attention when his Vijayawada team won National championship. Because of his national level recognition, he was rewarded with a job in Indian overseas bank in 2007.

== Professional life ==
Naveen Jacob is integral part of India men's national volleyball team. He wears number 18 jersey and plays in the position of Opposite/setter. As per his reviews, he said in the interviews that "In 2007 I was selected to the Senior Tamil Nadu team, the same year I was picked in the Indian team for the Youth World Championship in Mexico. Thereon, from 2008 until 2016 I represented the Indian team and from 2007 until this year the Senior Tamil Nadu team. Played in the Asian Games in 2010 and 2014 and Senior Asian Championship in 2009, 2011 and 2013, SAF Games and several other international invitation tournaments". Manidurai Naveen Raja Jacob has also captained Tamil Nadu Volleyball Team.
