= R. Chellaswamy =

Indian politician

Member of the Tamil Nadu Legislative Assembly
- Incumbent
- Assumed office 6 May 2026
- Preceded by: Mano Thangaraj
- Constituency: Padmanabhapuram

Personal details
- Born: 1961 (age 64–65) Killiyur, Tamil Nadu, India
- Party: Communist Party of India (Marxist)
- Parent: Ramayan Nadar (father)
- Education: Marthandam Nesamany Christian College (B.Sc.)
- Occupation: Politician

Ramayan Chellaswamy (born 1961) is an Indian politician from Tamil Nadu. He is a member of the Tamil Nadu Legislative Assembly from Padmanabhapuram Assembly constituency in Kanyakumari district representing the Communist Party of India (Marxist) which contested the 2026 Assembly elections in alliance with Dravida Munnetra Kazhagam (DMK).

== Early life and education ==
Chellasamy is from Killiyur, Kanyakumari district, Tamil Nadu. He is the son of Ramayan Nadar. He did his B.Sc. at Marthandam Christian College, Marthandam which is affiliated with Madurai Kamaraj University and passed out in 1980. He declared assets worth Rs.77 lakhs in his affidavit with the Election Commission of India. He started his political career as a student leader and was active in DYFI and AIKS.

== Career ==
Chellasamy won the 2026 Tamil Nadu Legislative Assembly election from Padmanabhapuram Assembly constituency representing the Communist Party of India (Marxist). He polled 68,938 votes and defeated his nearest rival, S. Krishna Kumar of the Tamilaga Vettri Kazhagam, by a margin of 15,569 votes.

=== MLA ===
Electoral results
| Year | Constituency | Party | Result | Votes | Vote % |
|---|---|---|---|---|---|
| 2026 | Padmanabhapuram | CPI(M) | Won | 68,938 | 38.18 |
