= R. Elango =

Indian politician

Member of the Tamil Nadu Legislative Assembly
- Incumbent
- Assumed office 12 May 2021
- Preceded by: V. Senthil Balaji
- Constituency: Aravakurichi

Personal details
- Party: Dravida Munnetra Kazhagam

R. Elango is an Indian politician who is a Member of Legislative Assembly of Tamil Nadu. He was elected from Aravakurichi as a Dravida Munnetra Kazhagam candidate in 2021.

== Electoral performance ==
Election	Constituency	Political party	Result	Vote %	Opposition			Ref
Election	Constituency	Political party	Result	Vote %	Candidate	Political party	Vote %	Ref
2021	Aravakurichi	DMK	Won	52.98%	K. Annamalai	BJP	38.90%	
2026	Aravakurichi	DMK	Won	39.11%	Karthikeyan. P	TVK	28.41%	
