= Aravakurichi Assembly constituency =

One of the 234 State Legislative Assembly Constituencies in Tamil Nadu in India

Coordinates: 10.77°N 77.92°E

Aravakurichi
- Constituency No. 134 for the Tamil Nadu Legislative Assembly

Constituency details
- Country: India
- Region: South India
- State: Tamil Nadu
- District: Karur
- Lok Sabha constituency: Karur
- Established: 1951
- Total electors: 1,95,538
- Reservation: None

Member of Legislative Assembly
- 17th Tamil Nadu Legislative Assembly
- Incumbent Elango.R
- Party: DMK
- Elected year: 2026

Aravakurichi is an assembly constituency in the Tamil Nadu legislative assembly, that includes the town of Aravakurichi and other neighbouring parts of Karur district. Its State Assembly Constituency number is 134. It is a part of Karur Lok Sabha constituency. It is one of the 234 State Legislative Assembly Constituencies in Tamil Nadu.

== Members of the Legislative Assembly ==
Election	Member	Party
1952	N. Rathina Gounder	Independent politician
1957	S. Sadasivam	Indian National Congress
1962	S. Sadasivam	Indian National Congress
1967	S. Kadasamy Gounder	Swatantra Party
1971	Abdul Jabbar	Indian Union Muslim League
1977	S. Sadasivam	Indian National Congress
1980	P. S. Sennimalai	All India Anna Dravida Munnetra Kazhagam
1984	S. Jegatheesan	All India Anna Dravida Munnetra Kazhagam
1989	Ramasamy Monjanor	Dravida Munnetra Kazhagam
1991	Asia Mariyamul	All India Anna Dravida Munnetra Kazhagam
1996	S. S. Mohammad Ismail	Dravida Munnetra Kazhagam
2001	E. A. Liyaudeen Sait	All India Anna Dravida Munnetra Kazhagam
2006	M. A. Khaleelur Rahman	Dravida Munnetra Kazhagam
2011	K. C. Palanisamy	Dravida Munnetra Kazhagam
2016	V. Senthil Balaji	All India Anna Dravida Munnetra Kazhagam
2019^	V. Senthil Balaji	Dravida Munnetra Kazhagam
2021	R. Elango	Dravida Munnetra Kazhagam
2026	R. Elango	Dravida Munnetra Kazhagam

Madras State

== Election results ==
=== 2026 ===
2026 Tamil Nadu Legislative Assembly election: Aravakurichi
Party	Candidate	Votes	%	±%
DMK	R. Elango	70,827	39.11	▼13.87
TVK	P. Karthikeyan	51,445	28.41	New
AIADMK	Selvakumar K.	49,289	27.22	New
NTK	Naren S.	5,154	2.85	▼1.23
NOTA	None of the above	637	0.35	▼0.14
Margin of victory		19,382	10.70	▼3.38
Turnout		1,81,078	92.61	▲10.23
Registered electors		1,95,538		
DMK hold		Swing	▼13.87	

=== 2021 ===
2021 Tamil Nadu Legislative Assembly election: Aravakurichi
Party	Candidate	Votes	%	±%
DMK	R. Elango	93,369	52.98	−3.47
BJP	K. Annamalai	68,553	38.90	New
NTK	Anitha Parveen. M	7,188	4.08	+ 2.78
AMMK	Thangavel. P. S. N	1,599	0.91	New
MNM	Mohammed Haneef Shahil. K. S	1,382	0.78	New
Independent	Saravanan. P	1,236	0.70	New
NOTA	None of the above	869	0.49	New
Margin of victory		24,816	14.08	
Turnout		176,245	82.38	
Rejected ballots		451	0.26	
Registered electors		213,946		
DMK hold		Swing		

=== 2019 By-election ===
2019 Tamil Nadu Legislative Assembly by-elections: Aravakurichi
Party	Candidate	Votes	%	±%
DMK	V. Senthil Balaji	97,800	56.45	
AIADMK	V. V. Senthil Nathan	59,843	34.54	
AMMK	Shahul Hameed	7,195	4.15	New
NTK	P.K.Selvam	2,227	1.29	New
MNM	S. Mohanraj	1,361	0.79	New
NOTA	None of the Above	904	0.52	
Majority		35,693	21.85	
Turnout		1,73,271	84.40	
DMK gain from AIADMK		Swing		

=== 2016 ===
2016 Tamil Nadu Legislative Assembly election: Aravakurichi
Party	Candidate	Votes	%	±%
AIADMK	V. Senthil Balaji	88,068	53.51	
DMK	K. C. Palanisamy	64,407	39.13	
BJP	S. Prabhu	3,162	1.92	New
NOTA	None of the above	1,538	0.93	
DMDK	M. Muthu	1,513	0.92	New
Majority		23,661	14.38	
Turnout		1,64,582	82.15	
AIADMK gain from DMK		Swing		

=== 2011 ===
2011 Tamil Nadu Legislative Assembly election: Aravakurichi
Party	Candidate	Votes	%	±%
DMK	K. C. Palanisamy	72,831	49.71%	4.11%
AIADMK	Senthilnathan. V	68,290	46.61%	
Independent	Vijayakumar. R	1,530	1.04%	New
Independent	Jagadeesan. N	1,355	0.92%	New
BSP	Marimuthu. C	779	0.53%	New
Independent	Ramasamy. V	370	0.25%	New
Independent	Mohamed Iqbal. H	326	0.22%	New
JD(U)	Shanmugam. S	180	0.12%	New
Independent	Kannan. R	161	0.11%	New
Independent	Muruganandam. L. K	139	0.09%	New
Independent	Indiramoorthy. V	106	0.07%	New
Margin of victory		4,541	3.10%	0.30%
Turnout		1,70,483	85.94%	11.19%
Registered electors		1,46,509		
DMK hold		Swing	4.11%	

=== 2006 ===
2006 Tamil Nadu Legislative Assembly election: Aravakurichi
Party	Candidate	Votes	%	±%
DMK	M. A. Khaleelur Rahman	45,960	45.60%	14.65%
MDMK	Monjanur Ramasamy. P.	43,135	42.80%	27.00%
DMDK	Basheer Mohamed. A.	6,619	6.57%	New
BJP	Manoharan. K.	1,744	1.73%	New
Independent	Ramamoorthy. R.	1,291	1.28%	New
Independent	Dalit Pandiyan. V.	633	0.63%	New
Independent	Bala Subramani. S.	523	0.52%	New
Independent	Kaja Mohideen. M.	336	0.33%	New
Independent	Mallika. S.	313	0.31%	New
Independent	Dhayalan. R. M.	229	0.23%	New
Margin of victory		2,825	2.80%	−14.28%
Turnout		1,00,783	74.75%	14.06%
Registered electors		1,34,828		
DMK gain from AIADMK		Swing	-2.43%	

=== 2001 ===
2001 Tamil Nadu Legislative Assembly election: Aravakurichi
Party	Candidate	Votes	%	±%
AIADMK	Liyaudeen Sait E. A	51,535	48.03%	18.14%
DMK	Lakshmi Duraisamy Tmt.	33,209	30.95%	−7.42%
MDMK	Monjanur Ramasamy P	16,954	15.80%	−8.63%
Independent	Amuthakumar V	2,054	1.91%	New
Independent	Sheik Abdul Kadhar M. S.	1,160	1.08%	New
Independent	Ganesan K	722	0.67%	New
Independent	Sasikumar M	707	0.66%	New
Independent	Pounkodi L	565	0.53%	New
Independent	Karuppusamy T P	395	0.37%	New
Margin of victory		18,326	17.08%	8.60%
Turnout		1,07,301	60.68%	−5.48%
Registered electors		1,76,820		
AIADMK gain from DMK		Swing	9.66%	

=== 1996 ===
1996 Tamil Nadu Legislative Assembly election: Aravakurichi
Party	Candidate	Votes	%	±%
DMK	S. S. Mohammad Ismail	41,153	38.36%	2.86%
AIADMK	Duraisamy. V. K.	32,059	29.89%	−25.72%
MDMK	Monjanur Ramasamy. P.	26,203	24.43%	New
Independent	Gnanasekaran. J.	4,767	4.44%	New
BJP	Chenniappan. V. S.	1,138	1.06%	New
PMK	Gunasekaran. K.	737	0.69%	New
Independent	Kumar. S.	455	0.42%	New
Independent	Jayapal. G.	399	0.37%	New
Independent	Natarajan. K.	224	0.21%	New
Independent	Annadurai. R.	70	0.07%	New
Independent	Dhayalan. R. M.	63	0.06%	New
Margin of victory		9,094	8.48%	−11.62%
Turnout		1,07,268	66.17%	2.90%
Registered electors		1,69,837		
DMK gain from AIADMK		Swing	-17.24%	

=== 1991 ===
1991 Tamil Nadu Legislative Assembly election: Aravakurichi
Party	Candidate	Votes	%	±%
AIADMK	Mariyamul Asia	57,957	55.60%	29.09%
DMK	Monjanur Ramasamy P.	37,005	35.50%	−6.90%
Independent	Muthusamy K.	1,461	1.40%	New
Independent	Amaravathi K.	906	0.87%	New
PMK	Arumugam T. P. S.	550	0.53%	New
Independent	Palaniappan N.	337	0.32%	New
Independent	Krishnamoorthy K.	209	0.20%	New
Independent	Periyasamy R.	206	0.20%	New
Independent	Chelllan K.	198	0.19%	New
Independent	Munisamy K.	175	0.17%	New
Independent	Kandasamy K.	173	0.17%	New
Margin of victory		20,952	20.10%	4.22%
Turnout		1,04,232	63.27%	−10.48%
Registered electors		1,73,736		
AIADMK gain from DMK		Swing	13.20%	

=== 1989 ===
1989 Tamil Nadu Legislative Assembly election: Aravakurichi
Party	Candidate	Votes	%	±%
DMK	Ramasamy Monjanor	48,463	42.40%	−0.22%
AIADMK	S. Jagadeesan	30,309	26.52%	−29.20%
INC	S. Sadasivam	24,226	21.20%	New
Independent	K. V. Somasundaram	6,423	5.62%	New
AIADMK	V. M. Duraisamy	3,100	2.71%	−53.01%
Independent	M. Damodaran	486	0.43%	New
Independent	Sakthkvel	346	0.30%	New
Independent	Muthuravi	310	0.27%	New
Independent	K. Pasupathi	216	0.19%	New
Independent	Kuliah Asiriyar	208	0.18%	New
Independent	S. Raman	120	0.10%	New
Margin of victory		18,154	15.88%	2.78%
Turnout		1,14,296	73.75%	−2.29%
Registered electors		1,57,264		
DMK gain from AIADMK		Swing	-13.32%	

=== 1984 ===
1984 Tamil Nadu Legislative Assembly election: Aravakurichi
Party	Candidate	Votes	%	±%
AIADMK	S. Jegatheesan	57,887	55.72%	4.12%
DMK	P. Ramasami	44,273	42.62%	New
Independent	C. S. Basheer Ahmed	792	0.76%	New
Independent	S. Sakthivel	492	0.47%	New
Independent	T. Kothandapani	443	0.43%	New
Margin of victory		13,614	13.10%	7.49%
Turnout		1,03,887	76.04%	10.81%
Registered electors		1,41,938		
AIADMK hold		Swing	4.12%	

=== 1980 ===
1980 Tamil Nadu Legislative Assembly election: Aravakurichi
Party	Candidate	Votes	%	±%
AIADMK	Sennimalai Alias. Kandahsamy P. S.	45,145	51.60%	
INC	Shanmugam. K.	40,233	45.99%	6.48%
Independent	Shanmugam. K. . L. I. M.	1,125	1.29%	New
Independent	Raman. S.	979	1.12%	New
Margin of victory		4,912	5.61%	−7.77%
Turnout		87,482	65.23%	2.78%
Registered electors		1,35,591		
AIADMK gain from INC		Swing	12.10%	

=== 1977 ===
1977 Tamil Nadu Legislative Assembly election: Aravakurichi
Party	Candidate	Votes	%	±%
INC	S. Sadasivam	32,581	39.51%	
DMK	P. Ramasamy	21,547	26.13%	
Independent	Abdul Jabbar	16,152	19.59%	New
JP	V.K. Ramasamy	5,666	6.87%	New
Independent	Muthan Alias Muthusamy	5,269	6.39%	New
Independent	Raman	1,252	1.52%	New
Margin of victory		11,034	13.38%	−13.54%
Turnout		82,467	62.46%	−3.35%
Registered electors		1,33,806		
INC gain from IUML		Swing	-20.59%	

=== 1971 ===
1971 Tamil Nadu Legislative Assembly election: Aravakurichi
Party	Candidate	Votes	%	±%
IUML	Abdul Jabbar	34,164	60.10%	
SWA	Kadasamy Gounder S.	18,859	33.18%	
Independent	Rengaswamy Gounder K.	2,653	4.67%	New
Independent	Krishnan P. V.	1,170	2.06%	New
Margin of victory		15,305	26.92%	−8.00%
Turnout		56,846	65.81%	−6.21%
Registered electors		1,00,107		
IUML gain from SWA		Swing	-7.36%	

=== 1967 ===
1967 Madras Legislative Assembly election: Aravakurichi
Party	Candidate	Votes	%	±%
SWA	S. K. Gounder	46,614	67.46%	
INC	V. P. Gounder	22,482	32.54%	−12.73%
Margin of victory		24,132	34.93%	23.30%
Turnout		69,096	72.02%	0.58%
Registered electors		99,247		
SWA gain from INC		Swing	22.20%	

=== 1962 ===
1962 Madras Legislative Assembly election: Aravakurichi
Party	Candidate	Votes	%	±%
INC	S. Sadasivam	28,372	45.26%	−9.76%
SWA	C. Muthusami Gounder	21,082	33.63%	New
IUML	Abdul Khader Jamali	8,919	14.23%	New
Independent	P. Thangavel	2,604	4.15%	New
Independent	P. Subba Naicker	1,704	2.72%	New
Margin of victory		7,290	11.63%	−7.97%
Turnout		62,681	71.44%	20.65%
Registered electors		91,900		
INC hold		Swing	-9.76%	

=== 1957 ===
1957 Madras Legislative Assembly election: Aravakurichi
Party	Candidate	Votes	%	±%
INC	S. Sadasivam	24,726	55.02%	21.63%
Independent	N. Rathina Gounder	15,920	35.43%	New
Independent	N. Senthilvel	4,291	9.55%	New
Margin of victory		8,806	19.60%	−3.51%
Turnout		44,937	50.79%	−14.31%
Registered electors		88,480		
INC gain from Independent		Swing	-1.48%	

=== 1952 ===
1952 Madras Legislative Assembly election: Aravakurichi
Party	Candidate	Votes	%	±%
Independent	N. Rathina Gounder	30,692	56.50%	
INC	T. M. Nallaswamy	18,140	33.40%	33.40%
Socialist Party (India)	T. N. Krishnan	5,487	10.10%	New
Margin of victory		12,552	23.11%	
Turnout		54,319	65.09%	
Registered electors		83,446		
Independent win (new seat)				
