= N. Dennis =

Indian politician (1929–2013)

Member of Parliament, Lok Sabha
- In office 1980–1999
- Preceded by: Kumari Ananthan
- Succeeded by: Pon Radhakrishnan
- Constituency: Nagercoil

Personal details
- Born: 23 January 1929 Vill. Keezhkulam, Vilavancode Taluk, Kanyakumari District, India
- Died: 21 June 2013 (aged 84) Nagercoil, Tamil Nadu, India
- Party: Indian National Congress
- Spouse: Smt. W. Gladys
- Children: 3
- Education: M.A., B.L.
- Alma mater: St. John's College, Palamcottah; University College, Calcutta; Ernakulam Law College; Trivandrum Law College
- Profession: Advocate, Agriculturist, Political & Social Worker, Trade Unionist

N. Dennis (23 January 1929 – 21 June 2013) was an Indian politician and Member of Parliament from Nagercoil constituency. He was elected six times to the Lok Sabha from Nagercoil constituency as an Indian National Congress candidate in 1980, 1984, 1989 and 1991 elections and as a Tamil Maanila Congress (Moopanar) candidate in 1996 and 1998 elections. He died in 2013 after a brief illness.

== Early life ==
He was educated at St. John's College in Palamcottah. He graduated with a MA degree from University College, Calcutta (West Bengal), Simultaneously he pursued his law studies at Ernakulam Law College and Trivandrum Law College (Kerala).

== Public life ==
- 1964-68 : Vice-President, District Congress Committee (Indira)[D.C.C. (I)], Kanyakumari, President, Town Panchayat, Keezhkulam
- 1965-76 : Chairman, Panchayat Union Council, Killiyoor
- 1971-76 : Member, Tamil Nadu Legislative Assembly, Member, Estimates Committee, Member, Rules Committee, Member, Panel of Chairmen
- 1972-73 : Associate Member, Delimitation Commission for Parliamentary and Assembly Constituencies
- 1975-78 : President, D.C.C. (I), Kanyakumari, Tamil Nadu
- 1980 : Elected to 7th Lok Sabha
- 1980-84 : Member, Committee on the Absence of Members from the Sittings of the House, Member, Committee on the Welfare of Scheduled Castes and Scheduled Tribes, Member, Consultative Committee, Ministry of Commerce
- 1984 : Re-elected to 8th Lok Sabha (2nd term)
- 1984-89 : Member, Consultative Committee, Ministry of Industry
- 1985-86 : Member, Committee on Estimates
- 1988-95 : Vice-President, Pradesh Congress Committee (Indira) [P.C.C.(I)], Tamil Nadu
- 1989 : Re-elected to 9th Lok Sabha (3rd term)
- 1990-91 : Member, Committee on Petitions, Member, Consultative Committee, Ministry of Food Processing Industries
- 1991 : Re-elected to 10th Lok Sabha (4th term)
- 1992 : Member, Consultative Committee, Ministry of Food Processing Industries
- 1992-96 : Member, Consultative Committee, Ministry of Agriculture
- 1993-94 : Member, Committee on Communications
- 1996 : Re-elected to 11th Lok Sabha (5th term)
- 1996-97 : Member, Committee on Home Affairs, Member, Committee on Subordinate Legislation, Member, Consultative Committee, Ministry of Agriculture
- 1998 : Re-elected to 12th Lok Sabha (6th term)
- 1998-99 : Member, Committee on External Affairs and its Sub-Committee-I, Member, Consultative Committee, Ministry of Communications, Member, Joint Parliamentary Committee on Essential Commodities Act

== Social and cultural activities ==
Working for making provision of transport and drinking water facilities in scarcity areas; got constructed several roads and provided sanitation facilities in backward areas and SC/ST villages; established communal harmony among the different communities and religious sects; and established educational institutions in different parts of Kanyakumari.

== Parliament activities ==
- Tamil Nadu Budget, 1980-81 - General Discussion, Demands for Grants Tamil Nadu Budget
