= S. Sadasivam =

Indian politician

Member of the Madras State Assembly
- In office 1957 - 1962; 1962 - 1967
- Succeeded by: N. Rathina Gounder
- Constituency: Aravakurichi
- In office 1977 - 1982
- Preceded by: P. Ramasamy
- Succeeded by: Abdul Jabbar
- Constituency: Aravakurichi

Personal details
- Party: Indian National Congress

S. Sadasivam was an Indian politician and former Member of the Legislative Assembly of Tamil Nadu. He was elected to the Tamil Nadu legislative assembly as an Indian National Congress candidate from Aravakurichi constituency in 1957, 1962, and 1977 elections.

== Electoral performance ==
Election	Constituency	Political party	Result	Vote %	Opposition			Ref
Election	Constituency	Political party	Result	Vote %	Candidate	Political party	Vote %	Ref
1957	Aravakurichi	INC	Won	55.02%	N. Rathina Gounder	Independent	35.43%	
1962	Aravakurichi	INC	Won	45.26%	C. Muthusami Gounder	SWA	33.63%	
1977	Aravakurichi	INC	Won	39.51%	P. Ramasamy	DMK	26.13%	
1989	Aravakurichi	INC	Lost	21.20%	Ramasamy Monjanor	DMK	42.40%	
