= Nagercoil Lok Sabha constituency =

Former constituency of the Indian parliament in Tamil Nadu

Coordinates: 8.17°N 77.43°E

Nagercoil
- Former Lok Sabha constituency

Constituency details
- Country: India
- Region: South India
- State: Tamil Nadu
- Assembly constituencies: Nagercoil, Kanyakumari, Colachel, Padmanabhapuram, Killiyur, Vilavancode
- Established: 1957
- Abolished: 2009
- Total electors: 14,935,09
- Reservation: None

Nagercoil was a Lok Sabha constituency in Tamil Nadu, India. K. Kamaraj. The first elected Chief Minister of Tamil Nadu was elected twice to the Lok Sabha from here. It has been now named as Kanyakumari (Lok Sabha constituency).

== Kamarajar by-election victory ==
The death of A. Nesamony in 1968 led to a by-election in Nagercoil constituency. Realising the popularity of Kamaraj in this constituency and the potential danger posed by Kamaraj's election after the Indian National Congress party's debacle in 1967 election, C. Rajagopalachari wrote in Swarajya, the magazine of the Swatantra Party, about the need to defeat him and appealed to C. N. Annadurai to support M. Mathias, the Swatantra Party candidate. Annadurai deputed M. Karunanidhi, the then Minister for Public Works, to Nagercoil to work in support of Mathias. Despite the efforts, Kamaraj won decisively with a 1,28,201-vote margin on 8 January 1969.

== Assembly segments ==
Nagercoil Lok Sabha constituency was composed of the following assembly segments:

- Colachel (moved to Kanniyakumari Constituency)
- Killyur (moved to Kanniyakumari Constituency)
- Nagercoil (moved to Kanniyakumari Constituency)
- Padmanabhapuram (moved to Kanniyakumari Constituency)
- Thiruvattar (defunct)
- Vilavancode (moved to Kanniyakumari Constituency)

== Members of the Parliament ==
Year	Member	Party
1952	A. Nesamony	Travancore Tamil Nadu Congress
1957	P. Thanulinga Nadar	Indian National Congress
1962	A. Nesamony	Indian National Congress
1967	A. Nesamony	Indian National Congress
1969^	K. Kamaraj	Indian National Congress
1971	K. Kamaraj	Indian National Congress (O)
1977	Kumari Ananthan	Indian National Congress (O)
1980	N. Dennis	Indian National Congress
1984	N. Dennis	Indian National Congress
1989	N. Dennis	Indian National Congress
1991	N. Dennis	Indian National Congress
1996	N. Dennis	Tamil Maanila Congress
1998	N. Dennis	Tamil Maanila Congress
1999	Pon Radhakrishnan	Bharatiya Janata Party
2004	A. V. Bellarmin	Communist Party of India (Marxist)
2009 onwards : See Kanyakumari

- In 2008, the Nagercoil constituency was renamed Kanyakumari. For results post-2008, please see Kanyakumari (Lok Sabha constituency)

== Election results ==
Vote share of Winning candidates
2004	60.88%
1999	50.21%
1998	50.00%
1996	35.18%
1991	51.60%
1989	53.20%
1984	50.01%
1980	51.32%
1977	56.76%
1971	58.37%
1967	53.38%
1962	56.37%
1957	75.78%

=== General Elections 2004 ===
2004 Indian general election : Nagercoil
Party	Candidate	Votes	%	±%
CPI(M)	A. V. Bellarmin	410,091	60.88	
BJP	Pon Radhakrishnan	2,45,797	36.49	−13.72
ABHM	T. Balasubramanian	4,612	0.68	
Independent	R. George Thomas	4,519	0.67	
Independent	B. Jamaludheen	3,336	0.50	
Margin of victory		1,64,294	24.39	0.60
Turnout		6,73,555	60.69	1.89
Registered electors		11,10,014		4.94
CPI(M) gain from BJP		Swing	10.68	

=== General Elections 1999 ===
1999 Indian general election : Nagercoil
Party	Candidate	Votes	%	±%
BJP	Pon Radhakrishnan	307,319	50.21	5.12
INC	N. Dennis	1,61,676	26.41	21.72
TMC(M)	D. Kumaradas	1,39,030	22.71	
Margin of victory		1,45,643	23.79	18.87
Turnout		6,12,095	58.79	−1.09
Registered electors		10,57,712		2.85
BJP gain from TMC(M)		Swing	15.03	

=== General Elections 1998 ===
1998 Indian general election : Nagercoil
Party	Candidate	Votes	%	±%
TMC(M)	N. Dennis	296,611	50.00	
BJP	Pon Radhakrishnan	2,67,426	45.08	14.84
INC	P. S. Stanislaus	27,821	4.69	−4.52
Margin of victory		29,185	4.92	−0.01
Turnout		5,93,176	58.32	−1.56
Registered electors		10,28,393		5.58
TMC(M) hold		Swing	14.83	

=== General Elections 1996 ===
1996 Indian general election : Nagercoil
Party	Candidate	Votes	%	±%
TMC(M)	N. Dennis	197,582	35.18	
BJP	Pon Radhakrishnan	1,69,885	30.25	11.43
JD	P. Mohammad Ismail	1,30,753	23.28	
INC	Kumari Ananthan	51,726	9.21	−42.39
AIIC(T)	A. Lawrance	5,248	0.93	
Margin of victory		27,697	4.93	−18.10
Turnout		5,61,651	59.89	1.47
Registered electors		9,74,018		2.63
TMC(M) gain from INC		Swing	-16.42	

=== General Elections 1991 ===
1991 Indian general election : Nagercoil
Party	Candidate	Votes	%	±%
INC	N. Dennis	279,813	51.60	−1.60
JD	P. Mohammad Ismail	1,54,900	28.56	
BJP	Pon Radhakrishnan	1,02,029	18.82	11.70
Margin of victory		1,24,913	23.04	8.72
Turnout		5,42,274	58.41	0.19
Registered electors		9,49,067		−0.41
INC hold		Swing	-1.60	

=== General Elections 1989 ===
1989 Indian general election : Nagercoil
Party	Candidate	Votes	%	±%
INC	N. Dennis	292,817	53.20	3.18
JD	D. Kumaradas	2,14,020	38.88	
BJP	M. R. Gandhi	39,164	7.12	
Margin of victory		78,797	14.32	11.84
Turnout		5,50,434	58.22	−9.39
Registered electors		9,52,947		32.17
INC hold		Swing	3.18	

=== General Elections 1984 ===
1984 Indian general election : Nagercoil
Party	Candidate	Votes	%	±%
INC	N. Dennis	235,365	50.01	
JP	P. Vijaya Raghavan	2,23,728	47.54	
Independent	S. Lekshmanan Pillai	7,957	1.69	
Independent	S. Murugan	3,539	0.75	
Margin of victory		11,637	2.47	−8.06
Turnout		4,70,589	67.62	11.72
Registered electors		7,20,980		8.69
INC gain from INC(I)		Swing	-1.30	

=== General Elections 1980 ===
1980 Indian general election : Nagercoil
Party	Candidate	Votes	%	±%
INC	N. Dennis	187,111	51.32	
JP	P. Vijaya Raghavan	1,48,703	40.78	
Independent	A. Wilson	18,137	4.97	
Independent	Poomedai S. Lekshmanan Pillay	4,656	1.28	
Independent	A. J. George	2,612	0.72	
Independent	N. Duraiswamy Nadar	1,850	0.51	
Margin of victory		38,408	10.53	−6.70
Turnout		3,64,605	55.90	−11.46
Registered electors		6,63,322		2.60
INC gain from INC(O)		Swing	-5.44	

=== General Elections 1977 ===
1977 Indian general election : Nagercoil
Party	Candidate	Votes	%	±%
INC(O)	Kumari Ananthan	244,526	56.76	
INC	M. Moses	1,70,290	39.53	
Independent	V. Emmanual	5,848	1.36	
Independent	Poomedai S. Lekshmanan Pillay	5,328	1.24	
Independent	S. Siluvai Pitchai	2,663	0.62	
Margin of victory		74,236	17.23	−10.02
Turnout		4,30,815	67.36	−0.66
Registered electors		6,46,525		16.87
INC(O) hold		Swing	-1.61	

=== General Elections 1971 ===
1971 Indian general election : Nagercoil
Party	Candidate	Votes	%	±%
INC(O)	K. Kamaraj	215,324	58.37	
DMK	M. C. Balan	1,14,771	31.11	
CPI(M)	P. Samuel	36,171	9.80	
Independent	P. Yonas	2,653	0.72	
Margin of victory		1,00,553	27.26	11.85
Turnout		3,68,919	68.02	−4.82
Registered electors		5,53,220		16.66
INC(O) gain from INC		Swing	4.98	

=== General Elections 1967 ===
1967 Indian general election : Nagercoil
Party	Candidate	Votes	%	±%
INC	A. Nesamony	180,265	53.38	−2.98
SWA	M. Mathias	1,28,251	37.98	
Independent	S. Chellaswamy	14,848	4.40	
Independent	P. Vivekananda	14,317	4.24	
Margin of victory		52,014	15.40	−11.71
Turnout		3,37,681	72.84	6.22
Registered electors		4,74,210		10.04
INC hold		Swing	-2.98	

=== General Elections 1962 ===
1962 Indian general election : Nagercoil
Party	Candidate	Votes	%	±%
INC	A. Nesamony	157,208	56.37	−19.41
Independent	P. Vivekananda	81,587	29.25	
Independent	A. Zachariah	20,403	7.32	
Independent	P. John Russel	19,698	7.06	
Margin of victory		75,621	27.11	−24.44
Turnout		2,78,896	66.62	16.88
Registered electors		4,30,947		13.36
INC hold		Swing	-19.41	

=== General Elections 1957 ===
1957 Indian general election : Nagercoil
Party	Candidate	Votes	%	±%
INC	P. Thanulinga Nadar	143,288	75.78	
Independent	Chellaswamy	45,798	24.22	
Margin of victory		97,490	51.56	
Turnout		1,89,086	49.74	
Registered electors		3,80,167		
INC gain from TTNC		Swing	24.93	

=== General Elections 1951 ===
1951–52 Indian general election : Nagercoil
Party	Candidate	Votes	%	±%
TTNC	A. Nesamony	115,893	50.85	
Independent	Sivathanu Pillai	43,778	19.21	
Tamil Nadu Congress Party	Thanulingom Nadar	36,158	15.87	
SP	Sam Natheniel	32,075	14.07	
Margin of victory		72,115	31.64	
Turnout		2,27,904	66.41	
Registered electors		3,43,195		0.00
TTNC win (new seat)				

== Bibliography ==
- Volume I, 1951 Indian general election, 1st Lok Sabha
- Volume I, 1957 Indian general election, 2nd Lok Sabha
- Volume I, 1962 Indian general election, 3rd Lok Sabha
- Volume I, 1967 Indian general election, 4th Lok Sabha
- Volume I, 1971 Indian general election, 5th Lok Sabha
- Volume I, 1977 Indian general election, 6th Lok Sabha
- Volume I, 1980 Indian general election, 7th Lok Sabha
- Volume I, 1984 Indian general election, 8th Lok Sabha
- Volume I, 1989 Indian general election, 9th Lok Sabha
- Volume I, 1991 Indian general election, 10th Lok Sabha
- Volume I, 1996 Indian general election, 11th Lok Sabha
- Volume I, 1998 Indian general election, 12th Lok Sabha
- Volume I, 1999 Indian general election, 13th Lok Sabha
- Volume I, 2004 Indian general election, 14th Lok Sabha

== See also ==
- Nagercoil
- List of constituencies of the Lok Sabha
