= Kunjan Nadar =

Indian politician and lawyer

Member of the Madras State Assembly
- In office 1951 - 1954; 1954 - 1957
- Constituency: Parassala
- In office 1962–1967
- Preceded by: Francis
- Constituency: Padmanabhapuram

Personal details
- Party: Travancore Tamil Nadu Congress

Kunjan Nadar, also known as Vattiyoorkavu Veeran (Hero of Vattiyoorkavu), was an Indian politician, lawyer and former Member of the Legislative Assembly. He was elected twice to Travancore-Cochin assembly and once to Madras State assembly.

He was elected to Travancore-Cochin assembly from Parassala constituency as an independent candidate in the 1952 election. He was again elected from the same constituency as a Travancore Tamil Nadu Congress candidate in the 1954 interim election. He was then elected to the Madras State Assembly as an independent candidate from Padmanabhapuram constituency in Kanyakumari district in the 1962 election.
