= V. Balachandran (Indian politician) =

Indian politician

V. Balachandran (Tamil: வி. பாலசந்திரன்) was an Indian politician and former Member of the Legislative Assembly. He was elected to the Tamil Nadu legislative assembly as a Hindu Munnani supported independent candidate from Padmanabhapuram constituency in Kanyakumari district in 1984 election.
