= S. Noor Mohammad =

Indian politician

S. Noor Mohammad was an Indian politician and former Member of the Legislative Assembly. He was elected to the Tamil Nadu Legislative Assembly as a Communist Party of India (Marxist) candidate from Padmanabhapuram constituency in Kanyakumari district in 1989 election.
