= V. George =

Indian politician

V. George was an Indian politician and former Member of the Legislative Assembly. He was elected to the Tamil Nadu legislative assembly as an Indian National Congress candidate from Padmanabhapuram constituency in Kanyakumari district during the 1967 election.
