= P. Mohammad Ismail =

Indian politician

P. Mohamed Ismail is an Indian politician and former Member of the Legislative Assembly. He was elected to the Tamil Nadu legislative assembly as a Janata Party candidate from Padmanabhapuram constituency in Kanyakumari district, in the 1980 election. He was the Tamil Nadu Janata Party president during 1980–1984. He was one of the 9 Janata Party parliamentary committee members during the early 1980s. He unsuccessfully contested the 1991 and 1996 parliamentary elections as a Janata Dal candidate from Nagercoil constituency.

Presently he is the Tamil Nadu state president for Janata Dal(S)since 2005. Earlier during 1984-89 he was the Janata Party president for Tamil Nadu.
