= Thompson Dharmaraj Daniel =

Indian politician

Thompson Dharmaraj Daniel also known as T.T.Daniel was an Indian politician and former Member of the Legislative Assembly. He was elected to the Travancore-Cochin assembly as a Travancore Tamil Nadu Congress candidate from Colachel constituency in Kanyakumari district in 1954 election. This was the first ever election held in this constituency and it happened before Kanyakumari district merged with Tamil Nadu. Also he was elected to the Tamil Nadu Legislative Assembly as an Indian National Congress candidate from Padmanabhapuram constituency in Kanyakumari district in 1957 election.
