= S. S. Mohammad Ismail =

Indian politician

S. S. Mohammad Ismail was elected to the Tamil Nadu Legislative Assembly from the Aravakurichi constituency in the 1996 elections. He was a candidate of the Dravida Munnetra Kazhagam party.

== Electoral performance ==
Election	Constituency	Political party	Result	Vote %	Opposition			Ref
Election	Constituency	Political party	Result	Vote %	Candidate	Political party	Vote %	Ref
1996	Aravakurichi	DMK	Won	38.36%	V. K. Duraisamy	AIADMK	29.89%	
