= K. N. Lakshmanan =

Indian politician (1930–2020)

2nd, 5th President of Bharatiya Janata Party, Tamil Nadu
- In office 1996–2000
- Preceded by: N. S. Chandra Bose
- Succeeded by: S. P. Kirubanidhi
- In office 1984–1989
- Preceded by: K. Narayan Rao
- Succeeded by: V .Vijayaraghavalu

K. N. Lakshmanan (20 October 1930 – 1 June 2020) was an Indian politician. He was a member of the Tamil Nadu legislative assembly elected from Mylapore constituency as a Bharatiya Janata Party candidate in 2001. He died on 1 June 2020 due to old age in Salem, Tamil Nadu. He was the President of Tamil Nadu BJP twice.
