= Sundankottai =

- Village
- Location in Tamil Nadu, India
- Coordinates: 8.381590°N 77.975025°E
- Country: India
- State: Tamil Nadu
- District: Thoothukudi

Government
  - Type: Gram panchayat
  - Body: Pallakurichi Panchayat
  - President: R.Sidhragadhan

Languages
  - Official: Tamil
- Time zone: UTC+5:30 (IST)
- PIN: 628703
- Telephone code: 04639
- Vehicle registration: TN 92
- Lok Sabha constituency: Thoothukudi
- Vidhan Sabha constituency: Srivaikuntam

Sundankottai is a Village in Thoothukudi District in the Indian state of Tamil Nadu. It is a small village situated near Sathankulam.

== Administration ==
Sundankottai comes under Pallakurichi Panchayat, Srivaikuntam Legislative Assembly and Thoothukudi Lok Sabha constituency

== Notable People from Sundankottai ==
- Dr.N.S.Chandra Bose, Former President of IMA (1991–1992) and former President of BJP, Tamil Nadu (1993–1995)
- M. A. Ganesa Pandiyan, Former Janata Party Leader Tamil Nadu, MLA candidate 1980, 1984 & 1991, Sathankulam Union Chairman, Pallakurichi Panchayat President.
- K Selwin Thangadurai D.S.P (Retd) CB-CID
- T. S. Balaiah - Tamil film actor
- F. V. Arul, former I.G of police and Director of C.B.I
- A.Ramasamy Nadar, D.S.P (Retd) CB-CID - Recipient of Tamil Nadu CM Police Medal for Gallantry - 1970
- K.Neethi Ragavan, General Manager (Retd), Issue Department - Reserve Bank of India, Chennai.
- Naveen Raja Jacob - India men's national volleyball team (2007 – present).
- Sattanathan Mohan - MD SETC, Tamil Nadu State Transport Corporation
- Vairavanathan Piramiah - Chief Engineer, WRD, Plan Formation Tamil Nadu Public Works Department, Chennai.
- Dr S Selva Seetharaman - Plastic Surgeon renowned for Hand transplant.

== Religious Landmark ==
- Mutharamman Temple - Stone Mandapam Build in 1923
- CSI Church - Established in 1869

== Gallery ==
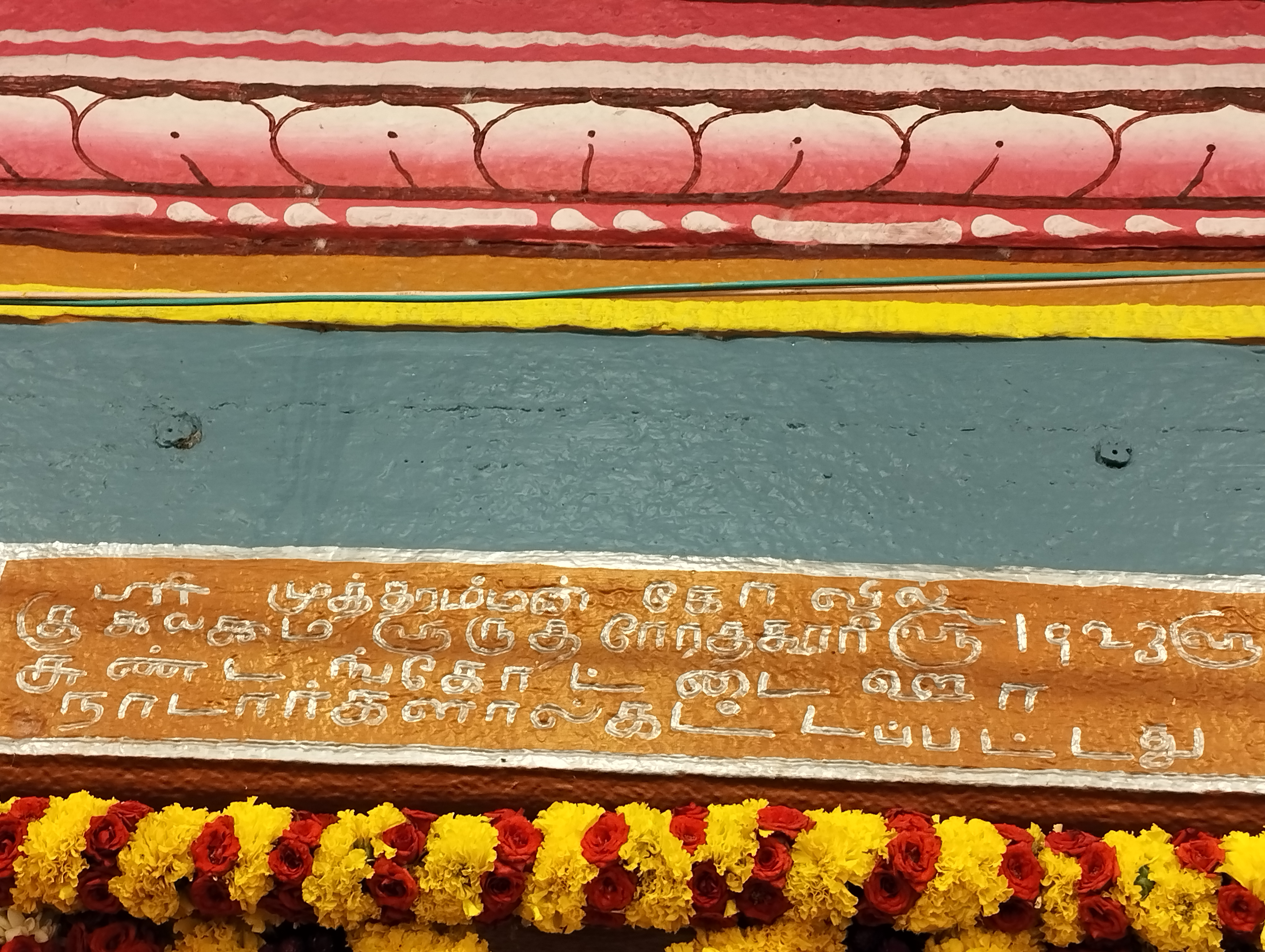
Mutharaman Temple Structure origin Inscription

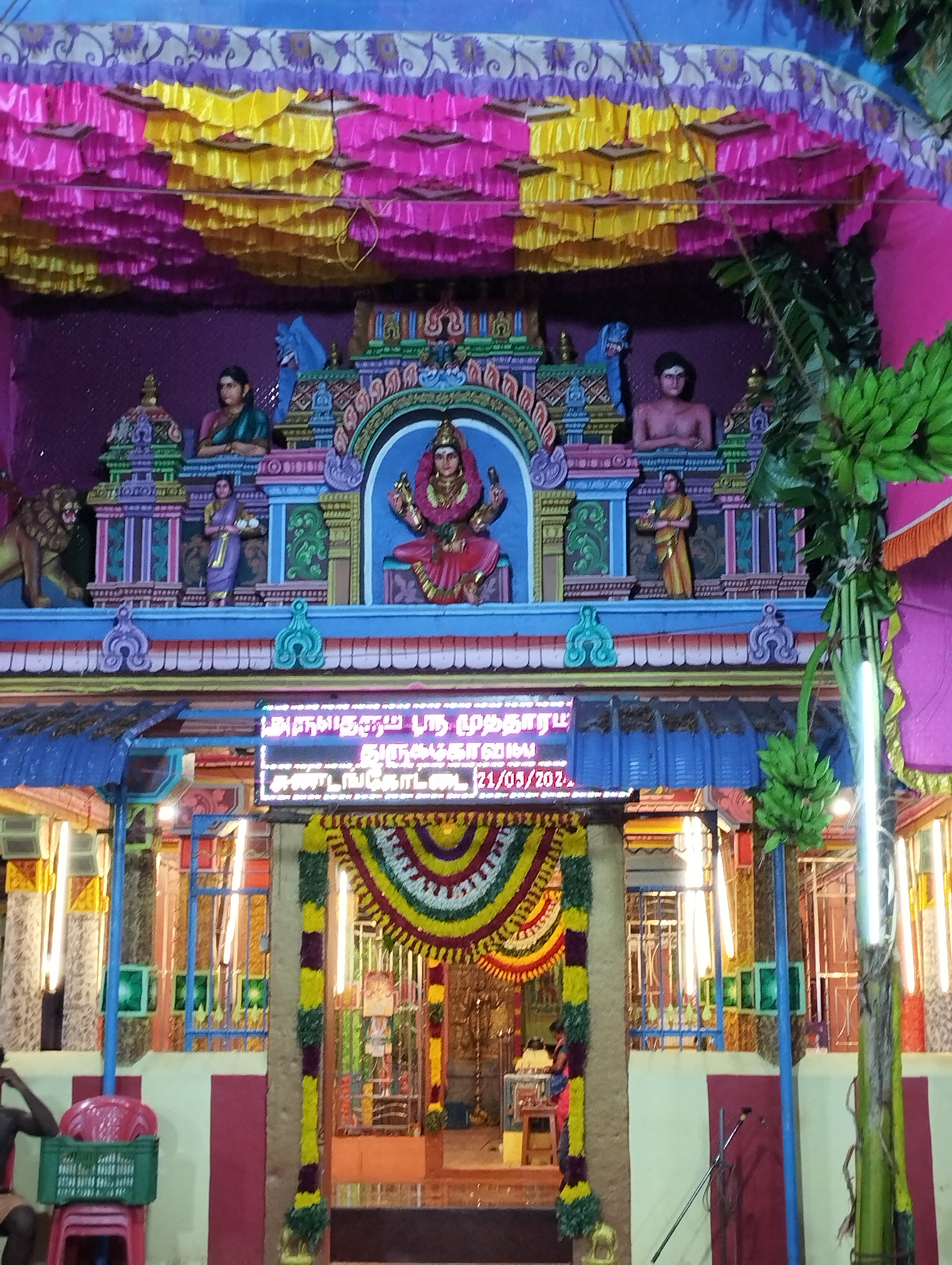
Mutharaman Temple - Front view

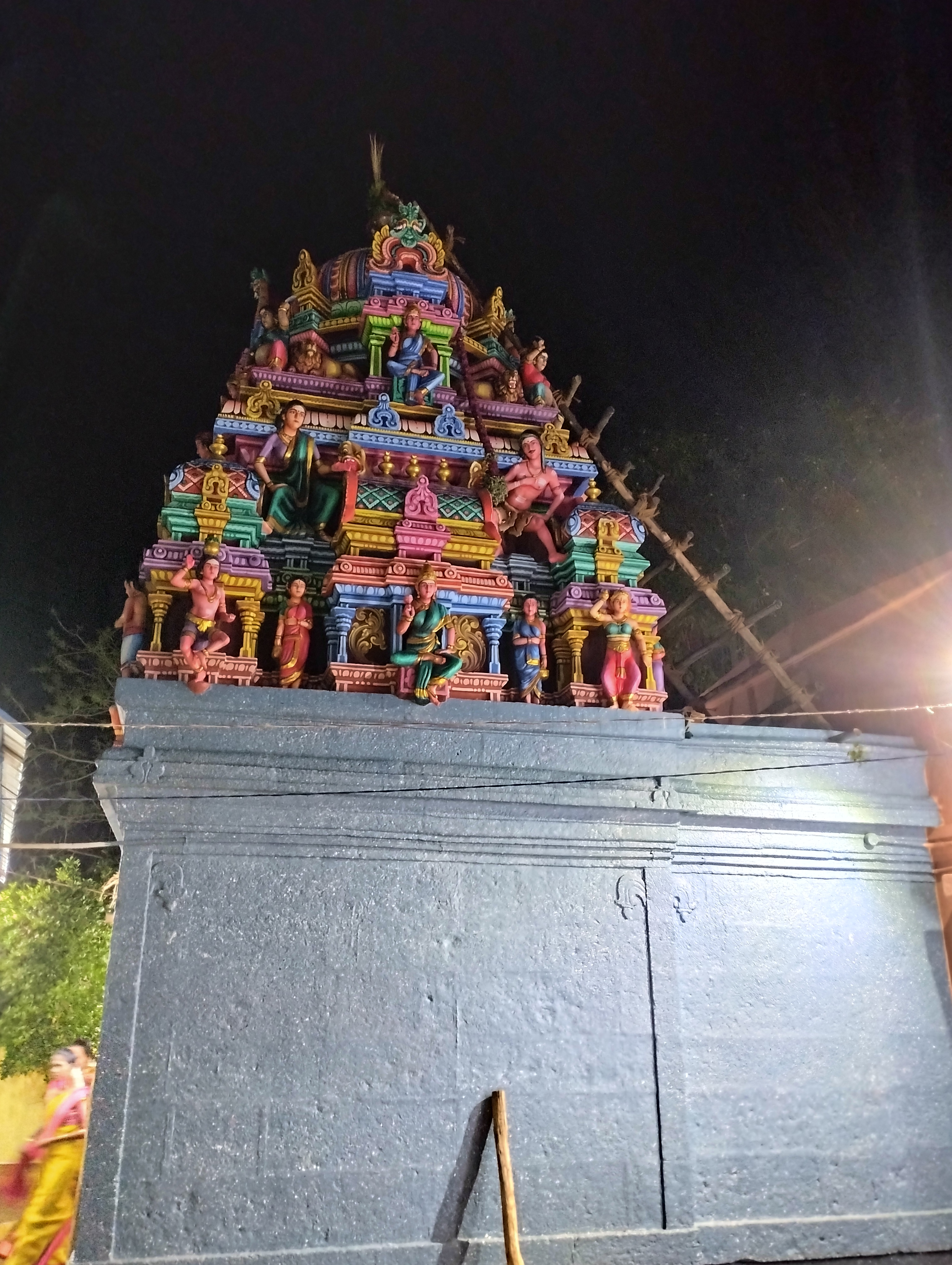
Mutharaman Temple Gopuram View

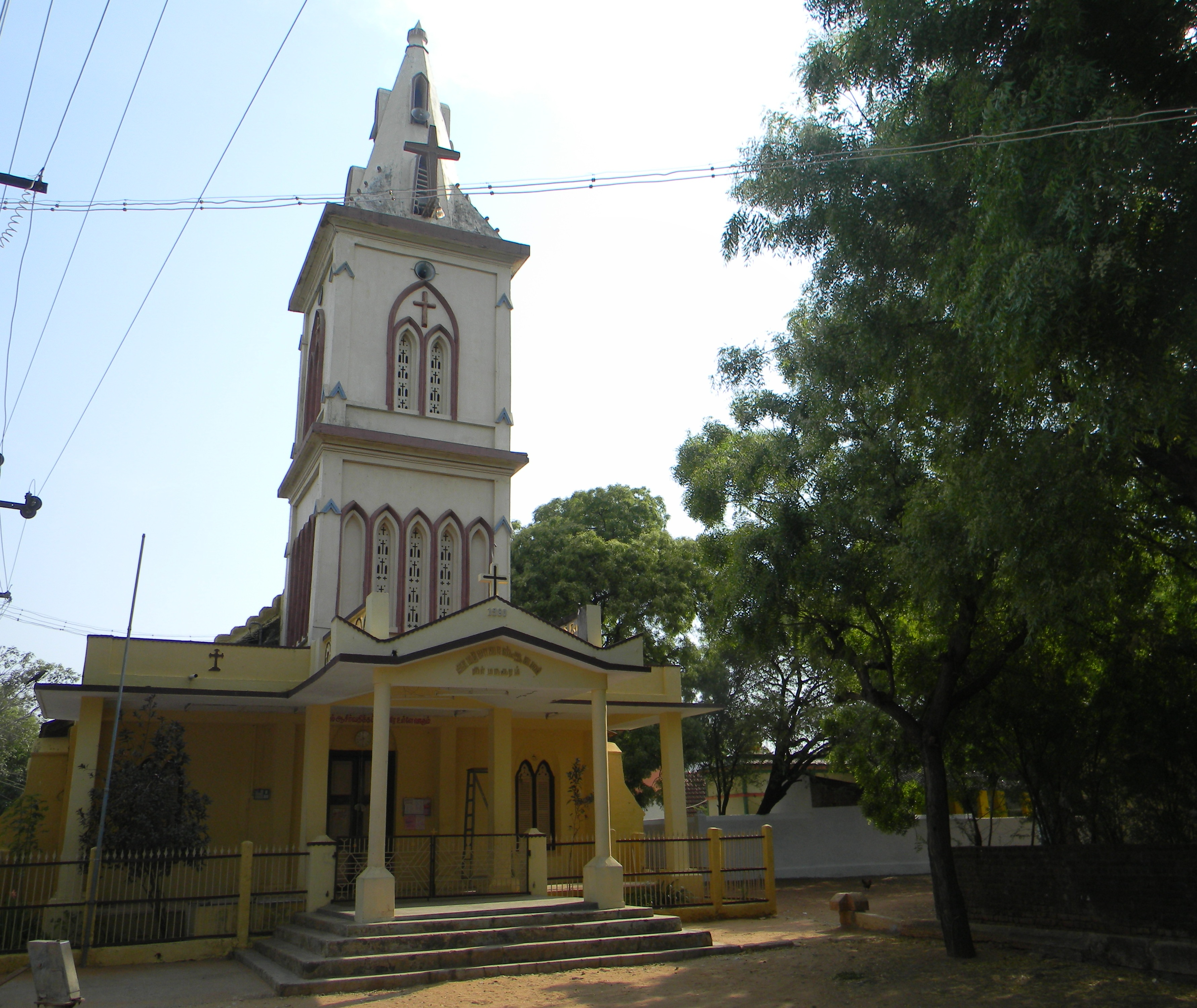
Church

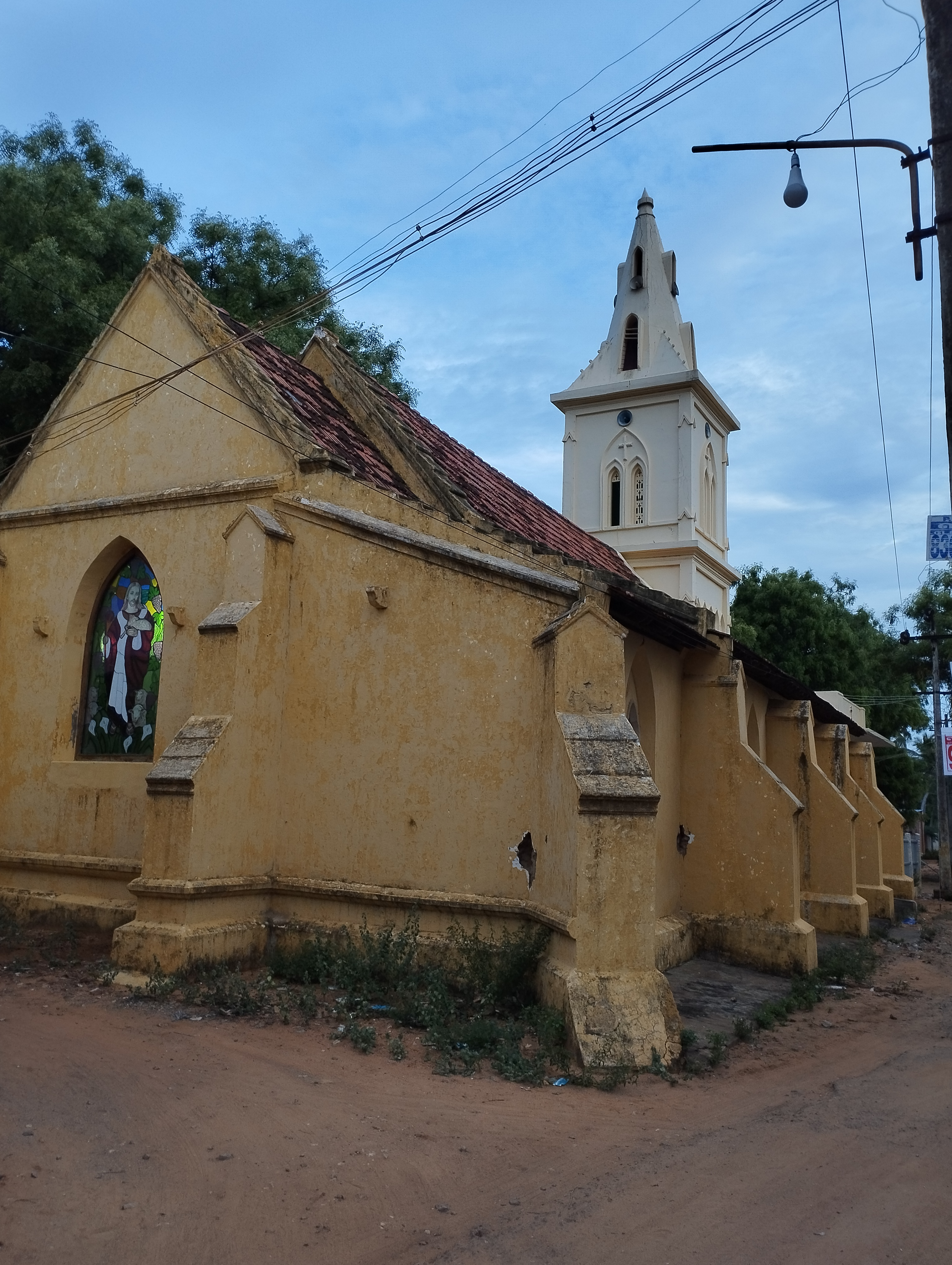
Church - Side View
