= N. S. Chandra Bose =

4th President of Bharatiya Janata Party, Tamil Nadu
- In office 1993–1995
- Preceded by: V. Vijayaraghavalu
- Succeeded by: K. N. Lakshmanan

Personal details
- Born: 13 March 1932 Sundankottai, Madras Presidency; British India
- Died: 13 October 2010 (aged 78) Thoothukudi, Tamil Nadu; India
- Spouse: Navamani
- Children: 4
- Occupation: Physician, Politician (1962 - 1995)

N. S. Chandra Bose MBBS, FCGP, FIAMS was the President of the Indian Medical Association from 1991 to 1992 and former President of the Tamil Nadu State Bharatiya Janata Party from 1993 to 1995.

Bose was educated at Kasturba Medical College, Manipal and began practicing Medicine in Thoothukudi, Tamil Nadu in 1962.

== Electoral performance ==
=== 1996 Indian general election - Tiruchendur ===
Party	Candidate	Votes	%
TMC	Dhanushkodi Aadhithan	317,943	53.3%
INC	S.Justin	114,232	19.2%
BJP	N.S.Chandra Bose	79,051	13.3%
JD	Anton Gomez	48,066	8.1%
IND	R.Sundaram	3,274	0.5%
IND	S.Arullappa Nadar	2,995	0.5%
Majority		203,711	34.2%
Turnout		596,500	60.9%
TMC(M) gain from INC			
