= T. Theodre Reginald =

Indian politician

T. Theodre Reginald is an Indian politician and a former Member of the Legislative Assembly from Maruthoorkurichi, Kanyakumari District. He was elected to the Tamil Nadu Legislative Assembly as a Dravida Munnetra Kazhagam candidate from Padmanabhapuram constituency in Kanyakumari district in 2006 election. He also became the first DMK MLA to represent padmanabhapuram constituency.
