= A. Swamidhas =

Indian politician

A. Swamidhas is an Indian politician and three times Member of Legislative assembly. He was elected to Tamil Nadu legislative assembly from Colachel constituency as an Independent candidate in 1962 election, Padmanabhapuram constituency in 1971 election as an Indian National Congress (Organisation) (NCO) candidate and 1977 election as a Janata Party candidate.
