= N. A. Noor Mohammad =

Indian politician

N. A. Noor Mohammad was an Indian politician and former member of the Legislative Assembly. He was elected to the Travancore-Cochin assembly from present day Kanyakumari district as a Tamil Nadu Congress candidate from Kalkulam constituency in 1952 election and Padmanabhapuram constituency in 1954 election. These elections were the first ever in this constituency before Kanyakumari district merged with Tamil Nadu.
