= K. P. Rajendra Prasad =

Indian politician (died 2020)

K. P. Rajendra Prasad (died 14 February 2020) was an Indian politician who served as Member of the Legislative Assembly. He was elected to the Tamil Nadu legislative assembly as an Anna Dravida Munnetra Kazhagam candidate from Padmanabhapuram constituency in Kanyakumari district in 2001 election.
