= K. Lawrence =

Indian politician (died 2020)

K. Lawrence (died 8 May 2020) was an Indian politician and former Member of the Legislative Assembly. He was elected to the Tamil Nadu legislative assembly as an Anna Dravida Munnetra Kazhagam candidate from Padmanabhapuram constituency in 1991 elections.
