= Kanniyakumari Lok Sabha constituency =

Parliamentary constituency in Tamil Nadu, India

Coordinates: 8.1°N 77.5°E

Kanniyakumari
- Lok Sabha constituency
- Interactive map of Kanniyakumari Loksabha constituency, post-2008 delimitation

Constituency details
- Country: India
- Region: South India
- State: Tamil Nadu
- Assembly constituencies: Kanniyakumari; Nagercoil; Colachal; Padmanabhapuram; Vilavancode; Killiyoor
- Established: 2009–present
- Total electors: 1,579,958
- Reservation: None

Member of Parliament
- 18th Lok Sabha
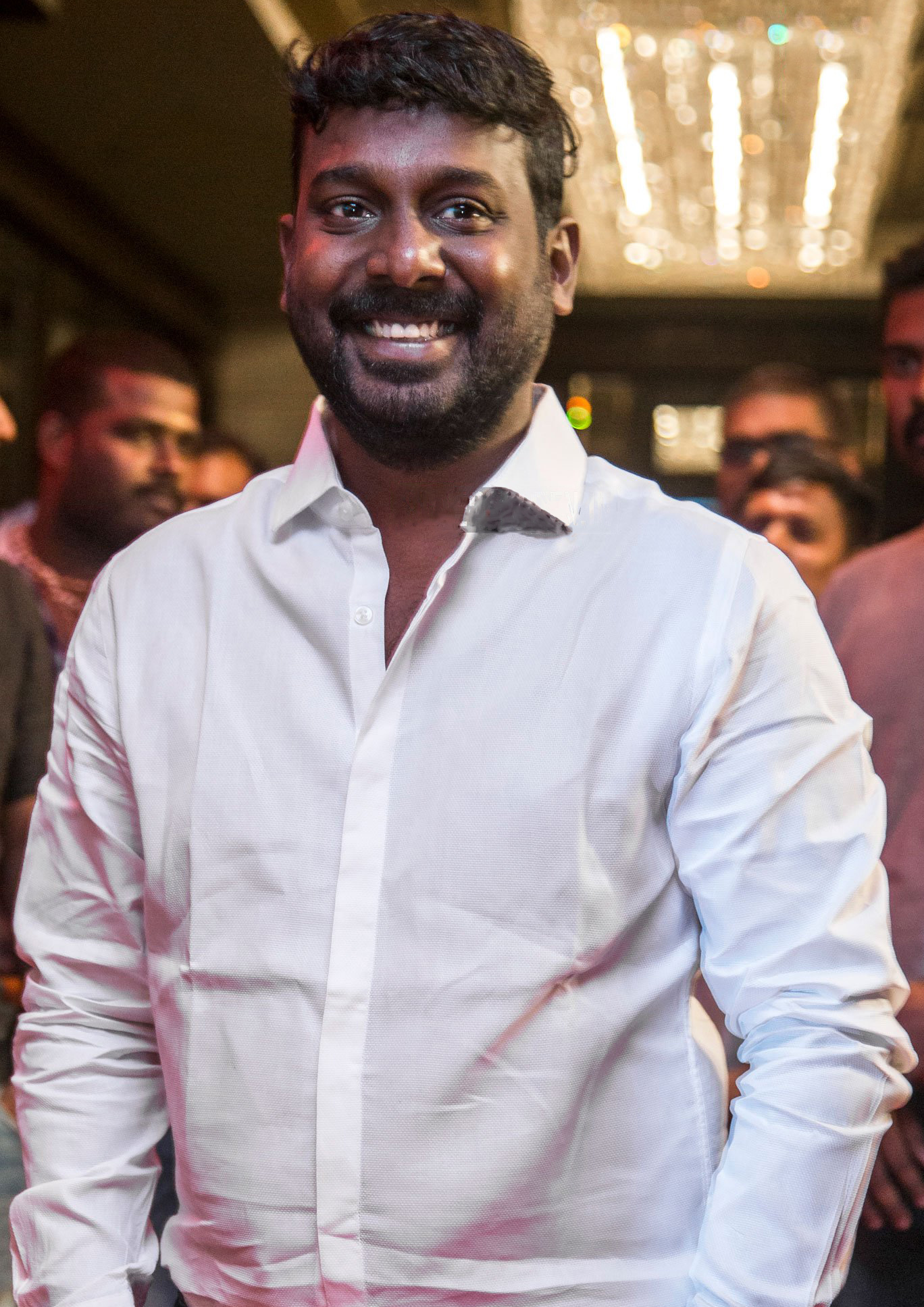
- Incumbent Vijay Vasanth
- Party: INC
- Alliance: INDIA
- Elected year: 2021
- Preceded by: H. Vasanthakumar

Kanniyakumari Lok Sabha constituency (Tamil: கன்னியாகுமரி மக்களவைத் தொகுதி) is one of the 39 Lok Sabha (parliamentary) constituencies in Tamil Nadu, a state in southern India.

== Assembly segments ==
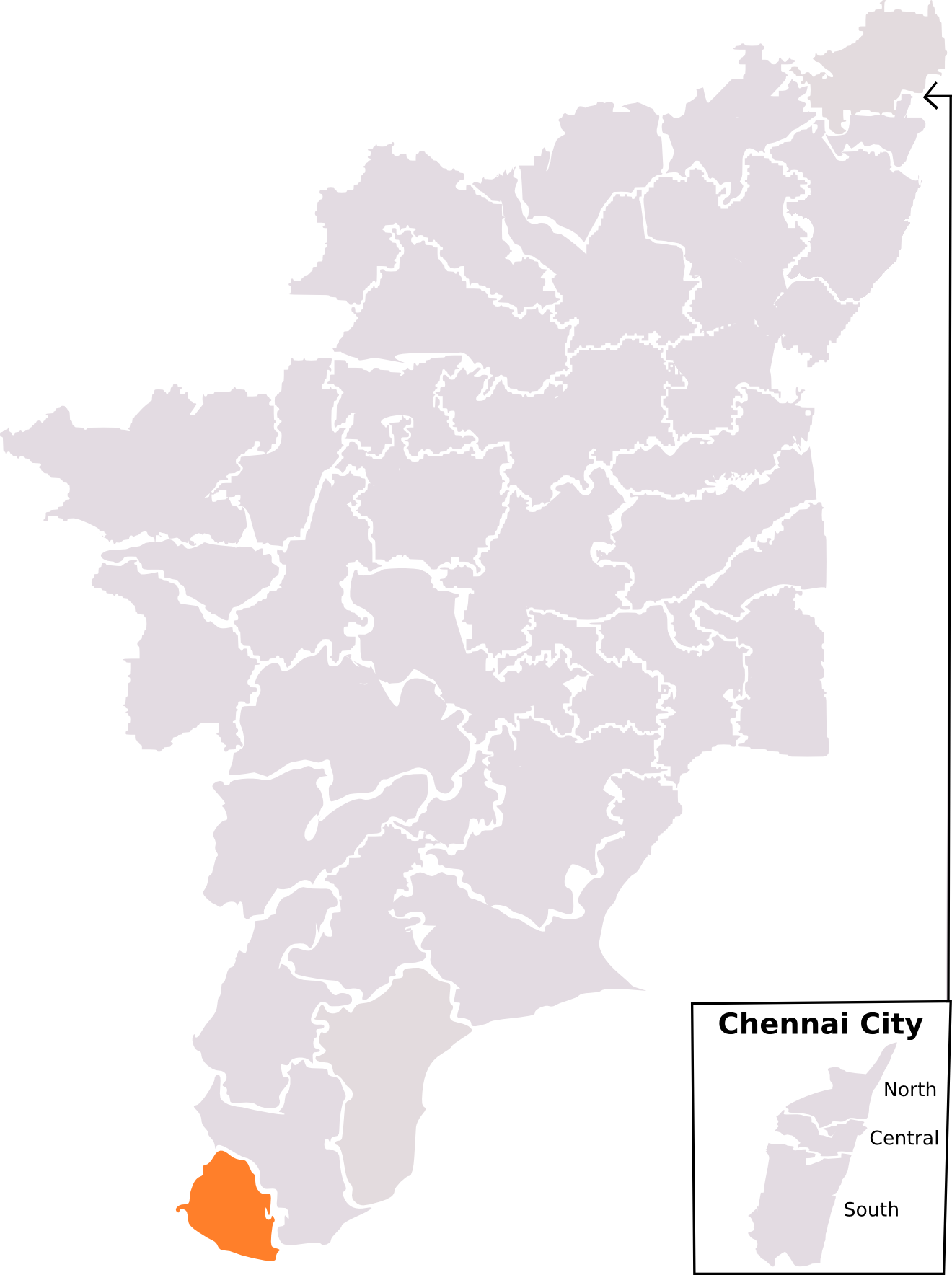
Kanniyakumari constituency as laid out by 2008 Delimitation

Kanniyakumari Lok Sabha constituency comprises the following legislative assembly segments:

Constituency number	Name	Reserved for (SC/ST/None)	District	Party	2024 Lead
229	Kanniyakumari	None	Kanyakumari	AIADMK	INC
230	Nagercoil	None	Kanyakumari	DMK	INC
231	Colachal	None	Kanyakumari	INC	INC
232	Padmanabhapuram	None	Kanyakumari	CPI(M)	INC
233	Vilavancode	None	Kanyakumari	INC	INC
234	Killiyoor	None	Kanyakumari	INC	INC

== List of members of parliament ==
Year	Member	Party
Before 2009 : See Nagercoil
2009	J. Helen Davidson	Dravida Munnetra Kazhagam
2014	Pon Radhakrishnan	Bharatiya Janata Party
2019	H. Vasanthakumar	Indian National Congress
2021^	Vijay Vasanth	Indian National Congress
2024	Vijay Vasanth	Indian National Congress

^By poll

== Election results ==
Vote share of Winning candidates
2024	52.74%
2021	52.50%
2019	59.77%
2014	37.62%
2009	41.81%

=== General Elections 2024 ===
2024 Indian general election: Kanniyakumari
Party	Candidate	Votes	%	±%
INC	Vijay Vasanth	546,248	52.74	▲0.24
BJP	Pon. Radhakrishnan	366,341	35.37	▼4.55
AIADMK	Pasilian Nazerath	41,393	4.00	New
NOTA	None of the above	3,756	0.36	▼0.09
Margin of victory		179,907	17.37	▲4.80
Turnout		1,029,055	65.71	▼3.75
INC hold		Swing	▲0.24	

=== General bye-election 2021 ===
2021 Indian general bye-elections: Kanniyakumari
Party	Candidate	Votes	%	±%
INC	Vijayakumar (Alias) Vijay Vasanth	576,037	52.50	▼7.37
BJP	Pon. Radhakrishnan	438,087	39.92	▲4.92
MNM	Shuba Charles	8,536	0.78	▼0.04
NOTA	None of the Above	4,938	0.45	▼0.13
Majority		137,950	12.57	▼12.20
Turnout		1,097,434	69.46	▼0.37
INC hold		Swing	▼7.37	

=== General election 2019 ===
2019 Indian general elections: Kanniyakumari
Party	Candidate	Votes	%	±%
INC	H. Vasanthakumar	627,235	59.77	▲35.13
BJP	Pon. Radhakrishnan	367,302	35.00	▼2.62
AMMK	E. Lekshmanan	12,345	1.18	New
MNM	J. Ebenezer	8,590	0.82	New
NOTA	None of the Above	6,131	0.58	▲0.16
Majority		259,933	24.77	▲11.79
Turnout		1,048,377	69.83	▲2.33
INC gain from BJP		Swing	▲35.13	

=== General election 2014 ===
2014 Indian general elections: Kanniyakumari
Party	Candidate	Votes	%	±%
BJP	Pon. Radhakrishnan	372,906	37.62	▲4.38
INC	H. Vasanthakumar	244,244	24.64	New
AIADMK	D. John Thankam	176,239	17.78	New
DMK	F. M. Raajarathinum	117,933	11.90	▼29.91
CPI(M)	A. V. Bellarmin	35,284	3.56	▼7.62
AAP	S. P. Udayakumar	15,314	1.55	New
NOTA	None of the Above	4,150	0.42	New
Majority		128,662	12.98	▲4.41
Turnout		990,742	67.50	▲2.51
BJP gain from DMK		Swing	▲4.38	

=== General election 2009 ===
2009 Indian general elections: Kanniyakumari
Party	Candidate	Votes	%	±%
DMK	J. Helen Davidson	320,161	41.81	
BJP	Pon. Radhakrishnan	254,474	33.24	
CPI(M)	A. V. Bellarmin	85,583	11.18	
DMDK	S. Austin	68,472	8.94	
BSP	P. Sivakami	6,400	0.84	
LJP	D. Arul Thumilan	2,812	0.37	
Majority		65,687	8.57	
Turnout		765,661	64.99	
DMK win (new seat)				

== See also ==
- Lok Sabha
- Parliament of India
- Kanniyakumari district
- List of constituencies of the Lok Sabha
- Nagercoil (Lok Sabha constituency)
