= Padmanabhapuram Assembly constituency =

One of the 234 State Legislative Assembly Constituencies in Tamil Nadu, in India

Coordinates: 8°15′2.6″N 77°19′36.2″E

Padmanabhapuram
- Constituency No. 232 for the State Legislative Assembly

Constituency details
- Country: India
- State: Tamil Nadu, India
- District: Kanniyakumari
- Lok Sabha constituency: Kanniyakumari
- Established: 1951
- Total electors: 235,511
- Reservation: None

Member of Legislative Assembly
- Incumbent R. Chellasamy
- Party: CPI(M)
- Alliance: LF
- Elected year: 2026

Padmanabhapuram is an assembly constituency located in Kanniyakumari Lok Sabha Constituency in Kanyakumari district in Tamil Nadu. It is one of the 234 State Legislative Assembly Constituencies in Tamil Nadu, in India.

== Members of Legislative Assembly ==
Year	Member	Political party
Travancore-Cochin
1952 (Note: Kalkulam)	N. A. Noor Mohammad	Travancore Tamil Nadu Congress
1954 (Note: Padmanabhapuram)	N. A. Noor Mohammad	Travancore Tamil Nadu Congress
Madras State
1957	Thompson Dharmaraj Daniel	Indian National Congress
1962	Kunjan Nadar (Note: (Rayan Nadar))	Independent
1967	V. George	Indian National Congress
Tamil Nadu
1971	A. Swamidhas	Indian National Congress (O)
1977	A. Swamidhas	Janata Party
1980	P. Mohammad Ismail	Janata Party
1984	V. Balachandran (Note: Supported by Hindu Munnani)	Independent
1989	S. Noor Mohammad	Communist Party of India (Marxist)
1991	K. Lawrence	All India Anna Dravida Munnetra Kazhagam
1996	C. Velayudham	Bharatiya Janata Party
2001	K. P. Rajendra Prasad	All India Anna Dravida Munnetra Kazhagam
2006	T. Theodre Reginald	Dravida Munnetra Kazhagam
2011	Dr. Pushpa Leela Alban	Dravida Munnetra Kazhagam
2016	Mano Thangaraj	Dravida Munnetra Kazhagam
2021	Mano Thangaraj	Dravida Munnetra Kazhagam
2026	R. Chellaswamy	Communist Party of India (Marxist)

== Election results ==
Vote share of winning candidates
2026	38.18%
2021	51.57%
2016	47.20%
2011	41.48%
2006	53.06%
2001	42.94%
1996	31.76%
1991	51.85%
1989	27.24%
1984	37.77%
1980	37.27%
1977	47.81%
1971	56.05%
1967	46.06%
1962	46.47%
1957	80.15%
1951	52.33%

=== 2026 ===
2026 Tamil Nadu Legislative Assembly election: Padmanabhapuram
Party	Candidate	Votes	%	±%
CPI(M)	Chellaswamy. R	68,938	38.18	▼13.39
TVK	Krishna Kumar. S	53,369	29.56	New
BJP	Ramesh. P	44,293	24.53	New
NOTA	NOTA	615	0.34	▼0.27
Margin of victory		15,569	8.62	▼7.18
Turnout		1,80,555	76.13	▲4.95
Registered electors		2,37,160		▼1,876
CPI(M) gain from DMK		Swing	▼13.39	

=== 2021 ===
2021 Tamil Nadu Legislative Assembly election: Padmanabhapuram
Party	Candidate	Votes	%	±%
DMK	Mano Thangaraj	87,744	51.57	+4.37
AIADMK	D. John Thankam	60,859	35.77	+13.89
AMMK	D. Jenkins	3,234	1.90	New
BSP	P. Latha	1,272	0.75	New
NOTA	NOTA	1,036	0.61	−0.23
MNM	M. Jeyaraj	981	0.58	New
Margin of victory		26,885	15.80	−9.52
Turnout		170,156	71.18	2.84
Rejected ballots		1443	0.85	
Registered electors		239,036		
DMK hold		Swing	4.37	

=== 2016 ===
2016 Tamil Nadu Legislative Assembly election: Padmanabhapuram
Party	Candidate	Votes	%	±%
DMK	Mano Thangaraj	76,249	47.20	+5.72
AIADMK	K. P. Rajendra Prasad	35,344	21.88	New
BJP	Su. Sheeba Prasad	31,994	19.80	−4.09
DMDK	D. Jeganathan	13,185	8.16	−19.94
NOTA	NOTA	1,359	0.84	New
Margin of victory		40,905	25.32	11.94
Turnout		161,560	68.34	−1.60
Registered electors		236,398		
DMK hold		Swing	5.72	

=== 2011 ===
2011 Tamil Nadu Legislative Assembly election: Padmanabhapuram
Party	Candidate	Votes	%	±%
DMK	Dr. Pushpa Leela Alban	59,882	41.48	
DMDK	S. Austin	40,561	28.10	
BJP	G. Sujith Kumar	34,491	23.89	
Independent	R. S. Sriraman	4,029	2.79	
Independent	M. Vijayakumar	1,803	1.25	
Independent	C. Robi	871	0.60	
BSP	Dr. C. Madhesan	808	0.56	
ABHM	S. Durai Raj	598	0.41	
Independent	R. R. Nisanth	431	0.30	
Independent	S. Vijaya Raj	319	0.22	
Independent	P. Ramesh Babu	283	0.20	
Margin of victory		19,321	13.38	−18.55
Turnout		206,399	69.94	7.57
Registered electors		144,362		
DMK hold		Swing	-11.58	

=== 2006 ===
2006 Tamil Nadu Legislative Assembly election: Padmanabhapuram
Party	Candidate	Votes	%	±%
DMK	T. Theodre Reginald	51,612	53.06	New
AIADMK	K. P. Rajendra Prasad	20,546	21.12	−21.82
BJP	C. Velayudham	19,777	20.33	−19.32
DMDK	C. Selvin	3,360	3.45	New
Independent	S. Thomas	608	0.63	New
Independent	Y. Lal Bensam	564	0.58	New
Margin of victory		31,066	31.94	28.65
Turnout		97,273	62.37	10.75
Registered electors		155,950		
DMK gain from AIADMK		Swing	10.11	

=== 2001 ===
2001 Tamil Nadu Legislative Assembly election: Padmanabhapuram
Party	Candidate	Votes	%	±%
AIADMK	K. P. Rajendra Prasad	36,223	42.94	+29
BJP	C. Velayudham	33,449	39.66	+7.9
Independent	P. Sundara Balies	7,059	8.37	New
JD(S)	D. Arulraj	5,455	6.47	New
Independent	R. Reghu	1,173	1.39	New
Margin of victory		2,774	3.29	−1.97
Turnout		84,349	51.62	−8.89
Registered electors		163,430		
AIADMK gain from BJP		Swing	11.18	

=== 1996 ===
1996 Tamil Nadu Legislative Assembly election: Padmanabhapuram
Party	Candidate	Votes	%	±%
BJP	C. Velayudham	27,443	31.76	+8.04
DMK	Bala Janathipathy	22,903	26.51	New
AIADMK	K. Lawrence	12,053	13.95	−37.9
CPI(M)	S. Noor Mohammad	11,746	13.59	−10.14
AIIC(T)	T. C. Joseph	10,942	12.66	New
Margin of victory		4,540	5.25	−22.86
Turnout		86,408	60.52	1.16
Registered electors		148,031		
BJP gain from AIADMK		Swing	-20.09	

=== 1991 ===
1991 Tamil Nadu Legislative Assembly election: Padmanabhapuram
Party	Candidate	Votes	%	±%
AIADMK	K. Lawrence	42,950	51.85	+45.76
CPI(M)	S. Noor Mohammad	19,657	23.73	−3.51
BJP	C. Velayudham	19,653	23.72	+5.47
Margin of victory		23,293	28.12	26.45
Turnout		82,838	59.35	−4.10
Registered electors		143,018		
AIADMK gain from CPI(M)		Swing	24.61	

=== 1989 ===
1989 Tamil Nadu Legislative Assembly election: Padmanabhapuram
Party	Candidate	Votes	%	±%
CPI(M)	S. Noor Mohammad	21,489	27.24	New
INC	A. T. C. Joseph	20,175	25.57	New
Independent	D. Kumaradas	17,330	21.97	New
BJP	C. Velayudham	14,404	18.26	New
AIADMK	P. Selvaraj	4,803	6.09	−25.96
Margin of victory		1,314	1.67	−4.06
Turnout		78,891	63.45	−8.59
Registered electors		125,883		
CPI(M) gain from Independent		Swing	-10.54	

=== 1984 ===
1984 Tamil Nadu Legislative Assembly election: Padmanabhapuram
Party	Candidate	Votes	%	±%
Independent	V. Balachandran	28,465	37.77	New
AIADMK	M. Vincent	24,148	32.05	New
JP	P. D. S. Mony	22,743	30.18	New
Margin of victory		4,317	5.73	1.35
Turnout		75,356	72.04	19.31
Registered electors		110,266		
Independent gain from JP		Swing	0.51	

=== 1980 ===
1980 Tamil Nadu Legislative Assembly election: Padmanabhapuram
Party	Candidate	Votes	%	±%
JP	P. Mohammad Ismail	19,758	37.27	New
GKC	K. Lawrence	17,434	32.88	New
INC	A. Pauliah	15,618	29.46	+21.71
Margin of victory		2,324	4.38	−12.63
Turnout		53,017	52.73	3.33
Registered electors		101,364		
JP hold		Swing	-10.55	

=== 1977 ===
1977 Tamil Nadu Legislative Assembly election: Padmanabhapuram
Party	Candidate	Votes	%	±%
JP	A. Swamidhas	22,910	47.81	New
AIADMK	N. V. Kanniyapan	14,757	30.80	New
DMK	A. Rajappa	5,551	11.59	−18.11
INC	M. Ratnaswamy	3,713	7.75	−48.3
Independent	R. Antrose Mary	662	1.38	New
Independent	N. C. Ramaswamy	321	0.67	New
Margin of victory		8,153	17.02	−9.34
Turnout		47,914	49.40	−16.84
Registered electors		97,615		
JP gain from INC		Swing	-8.24	

=== 1971 ===
1971 Tamil Nadu Legislative Assembly election: Padmanabhapuram
Party	Candidate	Votes	%	±%
INC	A. Swamidhas	32,416	56.05	+9.99
DMK	G. C. Michael	17,174	29.70	New
CPI(M)	M. M. Ali	8,243	14.25	−18.88
Margin of victory		15,242	26.36	13.42
Turnout		57,833	66.24	−4.15
Registered electors		89,344		
INC hold		Swing	9.99	

=== 1967 ===
1967 Madras Legislative Assembly election: Padmanabhapuram
Party	Candidate	Votes	%	±%
INC	V. George	24,661	46.06	+25.93
CPI(M)	M. M. Ali	17,738	33.13	New
SWA	J. Nesamony	6,247	11.67	New
Independent	A. K. Nadar	4,895	9.14	New
Margin of victory		6,923	12.93	−10.90
Turnout		53,541	70.39	9.77
Registered electors		78,992		
INC gain from Independent		Swing	-0.41	

=== 1962 ===
1962 Madras Legislative Assembly election: Padmanabhapuram
Party	Candidate	Votes	%	±%
Independent	Kunjan Nadar	23,747	46.47	New
CPI	Francis	11,572	22.65	New
INC	Thompson Dharmaraj Daniel	10,287	20.13	−60.02
Independent	J. Nesamony	5,492	10.75	New
Margin of victory		12,175	23.83	−36.48
Turnout		51,098	60.63	13.25
Registered electors		87,999		
Independent gain from INC		Swing	-33.68	

=== 1957 ===
1957 Madras Legislative Assembly election: Padmanabhapuram
Party	Candidate	Votes	%	±%
INC	Thompson Dharmaraj Daniel	29,276	80.15	New
Independent	S. Muthukaruppa Pillai	7,250	19.85	New
Margin of victory		22,026	60.30	
Turnout		36,526	47.37	
Registered electors		77,102		
INC win (new seat)				

=== 1954 ===
1954 Travancore-Cochin Legislative Assembly election: Padmanabhapuram
Party	Candidate	Votes	%	±%
TTNC	N. A. Noor Mohammad	14,684	57.59	New
Independent	V. Gregory Rajamony	7,600	29.81	New
CPI	M. Mohammed Ali	3,213	12.60	New
Margin of victory		7,084	27.78	
Turnout		25,497	66.02	{{{change}}}
Registered electors		38,618		
TTNC win (new seat)				

=== 1952 ===
1952 Travancore-Cochin Legislative Assembly election: Kalkulam
Party	Candidate	Votes	%	±%
TTNC	N. A. Noor Mohammad	13,860	52.33	+52.33
SP	T. Velappan Nair	8,686	32.79	New
INC	N. Ahmed Kannu	3,116	11.76	+11.76
TTP	T. V. Retnaswami	620	2.34	New
Independent	Subrahmania Iyer	206	0.78	New
Margin of victory		5,174	19.53	
Turnout		26,488	70.53	
Registered electors		37,558		
TTNC win (new seat)				
