= A. V. Bellarmin =

Indian politician

A.V. Bellarmin

Member of Parliament
- In office 16 May 2004 – 16 May 2009
- Constituency: Nagercoil

Personal details
- Born: 5 May 1954 (age 72) Nagercoil, Tamil Nadu
- Party: CPI(M)
- Spouse: Anbuselvi R.
- Children: 1 son and 1 daughter
- As of 22 September, 2006

A.V. Bellarmin (born 5 May 1954) is an Indian politician, belonging to the Communist Party of India (Marxist). He was a member of the 14th Lok Sabha, representing the Nagercoil constituency of Tamil Nadu. According to the CPM, He has held responsibilities in the General Workers’ Union, the Fish Workers’ Union and the Union of Construction Workers in Kanyakumari district and fought for the rights of workers. He is a serving member of the District Secretariat of CPM. During his stint as a member of Lok Sabha, he served as member of the Standing Committees on Defense and on External Affairs.

As a part of the standing committee on external affairs, he had championed the cause of Indian migrant laborers working in foreign countries, especially the middle-east. Calling himself as a social activist, Mr. Bellarmin cites the setting up of Kendriya Vidyalaya at Konam in Nagercoil and commissioning of Kuzhithurai bridge on NH47 among his achievements during his tenure as a member of the 14th Lok Sabha. Besides, A.V.Bellarmin has been fighting against sand mining in the coasts of Kanyakumari. In an open letter, he said

Rules have been changed and the private sand mining mafia has destroyed the beaches of southern Tamil Nadu. It is a shame as India is the world's leading reserve for Thorium which is also part of India's 3 stage nuclear power programme - sadly we don't seem to care even as it's looted under the Government's watch. Take a look at a rough estimate into how much of nuclear fuel has already been lost and the figures that emerge are shocking. So why is the Government choosing to turn a blind eye?

A.V. Bellarmin is contesting for the Kanyakumari Lok Sabha Constituency in the 2014 elections. His poll promises include: setting up of a commercial harbour at Colachel, IT park and rubber research centre in Kanyakumari district and restoration of The Anantha Victoria Marthandam Canal (AVM canal) so that it could be used for transportation of goods between Kanyakumari and Thiruvananthapuram. The AVM canal that runs along the west coast is also expected to boost revenues from tourism, if renovated.

== Electoral History ==
=== Lok Sabha ===
Year	Constituency	Party	Votes	%	Opponent	Party	Votes	%	Result	Margin	%
2014	Kanniyakumari	CPI(M)	35,284	3.56	Pon. Radhakrishnan	BJP	3,72,906	37.62	Lost	-3,37,622	-34.06
2009	Kanniyakumari	CPI(M)	85,583	11.18	J. Helen Davidson	DMK	3,20,161	41.81	Lost	-2,34,578	-30.63
2004	Nagercoil	CPI(M)	4,10,091	60.88	Pon. Radhakrishnan	BJP	2,45,797	36.49	Won	+1,64,294	+24.39
