= Pillai (Tamil title) =

Tamil surname used in Tamil Nadu and parts of Sri Lanka

Regions with significant populations
- major population in Tamil Nadu and Sri Lanka; minor population in Kerala and Karnataka

Languages
- Tamil

Religion
- Hinduism, Christianity

Related ethnic groups
- Vellalar

Pillai (Tamil: [piɭːai]) is a Tamil surname traditionally associated with the Vellalar community, found in Tamil Nadu and northern Sri Lanka. The Tamil surname Pillai meaning "child" or "younger one". Pillai title was also used to refer to Princes in Later Chola, Pandya Empires.

The Pillai surname of Tamil Nadu is distinct from the "Pillai " title associated with Kerala title Pillai, the two are unrelated.

== Orgin & history ==
=== Tamil Nadu ===
In Tamil Nadu, Pillai was predominantly used by the Vellalar caste, who were landowners and administrators under various Tamil kingdoms, including the Cholas, Pandyas, and Vijayanagara Empire. The title was often granted to individuals for their loyalty and service to the state, especially in administrative and military capacities.

The Vellalar Pillais played a significant role in administration, overseeing donations, rituals, and land management. The prominence of the Pillai title in Tamil Nadu peaked during the medieval period when many Pillais were recorded as holding influential positions in local governance and as temple trustees.

=== Sri Lanka ===
The Sri Lankan Vellalars share partially common origins with the Vellalars of Tamil Nadu. The Vellalar traditionally inhabited the Sangam landscape of Marutham.

== Social and cultural significance ==
The Pillai surname is closely tied to Tamil culture and social hierarchy. It is traditionally associated with notions of prestige and respectability. The title's widespread use among Vellalars reflects their historical dominance in agrarian and administrative spheres.

While primarily associated with the Vellalar caste, The surname has also been adopted by some castes in Tamil Nadu and Sri Lanka as a means of social upliftment, including the Konar, Agamudaiyar and some other caste. These surnames have been considered markers of elevated social status and cultural identity in the respective communities. (Note: To be a Vellala in Tamil agrarian society meant an ancient entitlement to superior social status. Caste, therefore, legitimised eco- nomic entitlement. It was not enough to have entitlements over resources; it was also necessary, in the Tamil agrarian social order, to have these entitlements legitimised through Vellala status, or at least a Vellala honorific.)

== Notable people ==
- Ashan Pillai (born in Sri Lanka, 1969), British violist and academic
- Anton Sebastianpillai (1944/5–2020), author and consultant geriatrician
- Ananda Ranga Pillai (1709–1761), dubash in the service of French East India Company
- Ariranga Pillay (born 1945), former Chief Justice and briefly Acting President of Mauritius
- Arumuka Navalar, born as Kandarpillai Arumugapillai, a Sri Lankan Hindu reformer
- Bastiampillai Anthonipillai Thomas (1886–1964), Sri Lankan Tamil priest and founder of Rosarians Order
- Bastiampillai Deogupillai (1917–2003), Sri Lankan Tamil Roman Catholic bishop
- C. W. Thamotharampillai (1832–1901), publisher of ancient Tamil texts
- Candice Pillay (born 1981), singer and songwriter
- Chempakaraman Pillai (1891–1934), freedom fighter from Travancore of Tamil descent
- Chinna Migapillai, 17th century feudal lord and rebel leader from the Jaffna Kingdom
- Dhanraj Pillay (born 1968), Indian hockey player
- Gerald Pillay (born 1953), South African theologian and ecclesiastical historian, Vice Chancellor and Rector of Liverpool Hope University.
- Gooty Kesava Pillai (1860–1933), Indian journalist and freedom-fighter. Delegate from Anantapur, Andhra Pradesh at the first session of the Indian National Congress.
- Jerry Pillay (born 1965), South African Reformed pastor, theologian and General Secretary of the World Council of Churches.
- K. C. Pillai (bishop) (1900–1970), Bishop-at-large of the Indian Orthodox Church, Antiochean Succession, Chennai (Madras), India
- K. Appavu Pillai (1911–1973), Indian politician
- K. Perumal Pillai, Indian politician
- K. Thamboosamy Pillay (1850–1902), a prominent member of the Tamil community in British Malaya
- Kavimani Desigavinayagam Pillai (1876–1954), Indian freedom fighter, poet
- L. D. Swamikannu Pillai (1865–1925), Indian astronomer, Speaker of Tamil Nadu Assembly
- Manonmaniam Sundaram Pillai (1855–1897), writer in Tamil literature; his poem "Niraarum Kadal Udutha" is the official Tamil Anthem
- Maraimalai Adigal (Nagai Vedachalam Pillai, 1876–1950), eminent Tamil orator and writer, started Pure Tamil movement Tanittamil Iyakkam
- Marimutha Pillai (1712–1787), musician
- Maruthanayagam Pillai (1725–1764), Indian soldier and administrator also known as Muhammed Yusuf Khan
- Naraina Pillai, social entrepreneur and businessman
- Navanethem Pillay (born 1941), South African judge, UN High Commissioner for Human Rights
- Palani Subramaniam Pillai (1908–1962), Carnatic music percussionist
- Panchaksharam Rangasamy Pillai (born 1943), known as Vijayakumar, is an Indian actor who works in Tamil cinema
- Periyapillai, 16th century king of the Jaffna Kingdom
- Pradani Muthirulappa Pillai, 18th-century minister of Ramnad during the reign of Muthuramalinga Sethupathy
- Prem Nath Pillai (born 1982), Malaysia-based filmmaker and editor
- Simone Ashwini Pillai, British Actress of Tamil native
- Sivathanu Pillai, Rocket Scientist
- Subbayya Sivasankaranarayana Pillai (1901–1950), Indian mathematician
- T. S. Ramasamy Pillai (1918–2006), Freedom-fighter, politician and former Member of the Legislative Assembly (India)
- Trevin Bastiampillai (born 1985), Sri Lankan Canadian cricketer
- Vella Pillay (1923-2004), South African economist and political activist
- V. O. Chidambaram Pillai (1872–1936), Indian freedom fighter, popularly known as V.O.C. and as Kappalottiya Tamilan
- Venkatarama Ramalingam Pillai (Namakkal Kavignar Ramalingam Pillai, 1888–1972), poet and freedom fighter.

== See also ==
- List of Vellalars
- List of Vellalar sub castes
- Pillai (surname)
