= Pillai (surname) =

Pillai or Pillay, (IPA: [piɭːai̯]) meaning "Child of King" (Prince) or "Child", is a surname or title found among the Malayalam and Tamil speaking people of India and Sri Lanka.

In Kerala, Pillai is the most common title among upper-caste Nairs, often bestowed by the ruling royal families of Kerala and less commonly found among some Brahmins, Nazrani Mappila and Marars of Travancore.

In Tamil Nadu, it is a most common surname among various high-ranking Vellalar subcastes. (Note: The term "Vellalar" is a generic term for a group of high ranking Non-brahmin castes in TamilNadu) It is less commonly found among some other Tamil-speaking castes, including Isai Vellalar, Agamudayar, etc. A minority population of Tamil Pillais have migrated and can be found in some parts of Kerala and Karnataka.

In general, the concept of "the Pillai title of Kerala" and "the Pillai surname of Tamilnadu" have two different meanings and no direct relation with each other.

== Etymology and origin ==
According to epigraphic records, Pillai is an ancient title back to the Sangam Era that was used as a suffix and given to junior members of the royal family. Originally a title meaning "royal child" or "Child of King" (prince), denoting nobility. The title occurs both as a single name or as a suffix to the name, it came to be given to administrators of temples; often holding large estates on behalf of the latter.

Early English records also address these hereditary ruling chiefs as the princes of Kerala ranking below the monarch. The most well known are the Pillais of the Eight Nair Noble Houses, the Ettuveettil Pillamar of Travancore.

=== Pillais of Kerala ===
In Kerala, the usage of the Pillai surname began with the royal family of Kerala. "Pillai" traditionally signifies a child of a royal family or prince. Pillai is a surname reserved for junior members of the Kerala royal family who are descendants of Survyanshi and Chandravanshi Kshatriyas.

In the 12th century, with the formation of the Kulashekara Kingdom based in Kollam (later known as Venadu kingdom), the culture of Pillai nomenclature underwent significant changes. The Kulashekara Kings started using Pilla as an honorific title for their chieftains and lords, rather than members of the royal family. Members of the royal family now have a uniformed surname - Varma, while children of the King who are not part of the royal family (due to the following of Marumakathayam laws where lineage moves via females of the house), their surname shall be Thampi and Thangachi.

During the Venad era, Pillai was the title given to Nair Landlords and Provincial governors, and those who had taxation power over Quilon and Trivandrum regions. The most famous among them being the Ettuveetil Pillaimar. Gradually, it became one of the common surnames of the highest echelon of Nairs, who were mostly referred to as Madambi or barons. These Nairs had the right to use the Pillai surname for all their family members.

However, with the formation of the Travancore Kingdom, the concept of Pilla underwent significant changes under the reign of Anizham Thirunal Marthanda Varma Maharaja, who centralized the rule of Travancore. The Pillai surname was given to those who were part of the Royal service, which includes advisors, bureaucrats, administrators, military commanders, etc., most of whom were of Nair and Brahmin origin.

The Pillai surname of Venadu kingdom and Travancore is fully reserved for savarna subjects, most of whom are equivalent to Kshatriyas and Brahmins in the northern caste system. It's important to note that the caste system in Kerala differs from that in other parts of India.

=== Pillais of Tamilnadu ===
Pillai or Pillay, is an ancient Tamil word meaning "child" or "younger ones." In the Chola court, a specific group of Vellalars had a dispute over rights to certain land, with one faction claiming based on seniority, referred to as Mudaliar, meaning "first one" and the other based on tenancy rights, referred to as Pillaiyar, meaning "younger one"., which also meaning "Child of Parvati" (Parvati Devi),

The plural form of "Pillai" is "Pillaimar", which transforms into "Pillaiyār" when the plural suffix is replaced by an honorific suffix. This transformation has led to semantic confusion, as the term "Pillaiyār" is also a common reference to the god Ganesha in Tamil tradition. While this linguistic overlap exists, the two usages are contextually distinct: one referring to the plural or honorific form of "Pillai," and the other to the deity.

Vellalar, a dominant landowning caste in Tamil society, possess a unique origin myth that emphasizes their elevated status and connection to divine purity. This myth finds its roots in a symbolic pun that intertwines their cultural identity with their socio-economic role. The Vellalar claim to be the "children" (Pillai) of the goddess Parvati, a revered deity in Hindu mythology. According to tradition, this divine lineage underscores the Vellalar’s purity, which is considered essential for the fertility of the land and the prosperity of the territories under their command. The term Pillai, central to their origin narrative, carries dual connotations. On one hand, it reflects the notion of divine parentage, as the "children" of Parvati. On the other hand, Pillai is also a lordly title historically associated with landowning castes in southern Tamil Nadu, a region from which the majority of the Vellalar are believed to have originated. As recorded by Arunachalam (1964), a branch of the Vellalar, who were traditionally regarded as the ruling caste of Tamil Nadu, claimed to have received grain and agricultural knowledge from the Earth Goddess Parvati. This divine gift of sustenance and skill is cited as the foundation of their identity as both the cultivators of food and the rulers of the land. To emphasize their importance, the Vellalar assert that they are creators of life itself, given their central role in food production.

While primarily associated with the Vellalar caste, The surname has also been adopted by some castes in Tamil Nadu and Sri Lanka as a means of social upliftment, including the Konar, Agamudaiyar, Isai Vellalar and some other caste. These surnames have been considered markers of elevated social status and cultural identity in the respective communities. (Note: To be a Vellala in Tamil agrarian society meant an ancient entitlement to superior social status. Caste, therefore, legitimised eco- nomic entitlement. It was not enough to have entitlements over resources; it was also necessary, in the Tamil agrarian social order, to have these entitlements legitimised through Vellala status, or at least a Vellala honorific.)

== Notable Tamil Pillais ==
Notable people with this surname or its variants include:

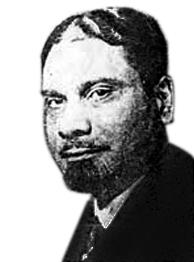
"Champakraman Pillai" Indian freedom fighter.

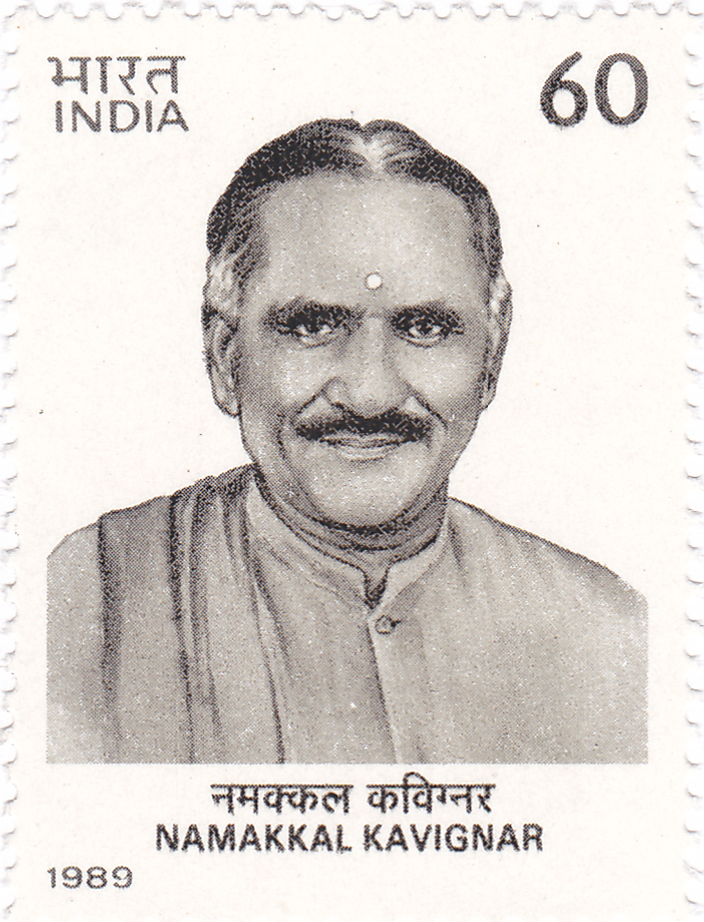
Venkatarama Ramalingam Pillai 1989 stamp of India

- Ashan Pillai (born in Sri Lanka, 1969), British violist and academic
- Anton Sebastianpillai (1944/5–2020), author and consultant geriatrician
- Ananda Ranga Pillai (1709–1761), dubash in the service of French East India Company
- Ariranga Pillay (born 1945), former Chief Justice and briefly Acting President of Mauritius
- Arumuka Navalar, born as Kandarpillai Arumugapillai, a Sri Lankan Hindu reformer
- Bastiampillai Anthonipillai Thomas (1886–1964), Sri Lankan Tamil priest and founder of Rosarians Order
- Bastiampillai Deogupillai (1917–2003), Sri Lankan Tamil Roman Catholic bishop
- C. W. Thamotharampillai (1832–1901), publisher of ancient Tamil texts
- Candice Pillay (born 1981), singer and songwriter
- Chempakaraman Pillai (1891–1934), freedom fighter from Travancore of Tamil descent
- Chinna Migapillai, 17th century feudal lord and rebel leader from the Jaffna Kingdom
- Dhanraj Pillay (born 1968), Indian hockey player
- Gerald Pillay (born 1953), South African theologian and ecclesiastical historian, Vice Chancellor and Rector of Liverpool Hope University.
- Gooty Kesava Pillai (1860–1933), Indian journalist and freedom-fighter. Delegate from Anantapur, Andhra Pradesh at the first session of the Indian National Congress.
- Jerry Pillay (born 1965), South African Reformed pastor, theologian and General Secretary of the World Council of Churches.
- K. C. Pillai (bishop) (1900–1970), Bishop-at-large of the Indian Orthodox Church, Antiochean Succession, Chennai (Madras), India
- K. Appavu Pillai (1911–1973), Indian politician
- K. Perumal Pillai, Indian politician
- K. Thamboosamy Pillay (1850–1902), a prominent member of the Tamil community in British Malaya
- Kavimani Desigavinayagam Pillai (1876–1954), Indian freedom fighter, poet
- L. D. Swamikannu Pillai (1865–1925), Indian astronomer, Speaker of Tamil Nadu Assembly
- Manonmaniam Sundaram Pillai (1855–1897), writer in Tamil literature; his poem "Niraarum Kadal Udutha" is the official Tamil Anthem
- Maraimalai Adigal (Nagai Vedachalam Pillai, 1876–1950), eminent Tamil orator and writer, started Pure Tamil movement Tanittamil Iyakkam
- Marimutha Pillai (1712–1787), musician
- Maruthanayagam Pillai (1725–1764), Indian soldier and administrator also known as Muhammed Yusuf Khan
- Naraina Pillai, social entrepreneur and businessman
- Navanethem Pillay (born 1941), South African judge, UN High Commissioner for Human Rights
- Palani Subramaniam Pillai (1908–1962), Carnatic music percussionist
- Panchaksharam Rangasamy Pillai (born 1943), known as Vijayakumar, is an Indian actor who works in Tamil cinema
- Periyapillai, 16th century king of the Jaffna Kingdom
- Pradani Muthirulappa Pillai, 18th-century minister of Ramnad during the reign of Muthuramalinga Sethupathy
- Prem Nath Pillai (born 1982), Malaysia-based filmmaker and editor
- Simone Ashwini Pillai, British Actress of Tamil native
- Sivathanu Pillai, Rocket Scientist
- Subbayya Sivasankaranarayana Pillai (1901–1950), Indian mathematician
- T. S. Ramasamy Pillai (1918–2006), Freedom-fighter, politician and former Member of the Legislative Assembly (India)
- Trevin Bastiampillai (born 1985), Sri Lankan Canadian cricketer
- Vella Pillay (1923-2004), South African economist and political activist
- V. O. Chidambaram Pillai (1872–1936), Indian freedom fighter, popularly known as V.O.C. and as Kappalottiya Tamilan
- Venkatarama Ramalingam Pillai (Namakkal Kavignar Ramalingam Pillai, 1888–1972), poet and freedom fighter.

== Notable Malayali Pillais ==
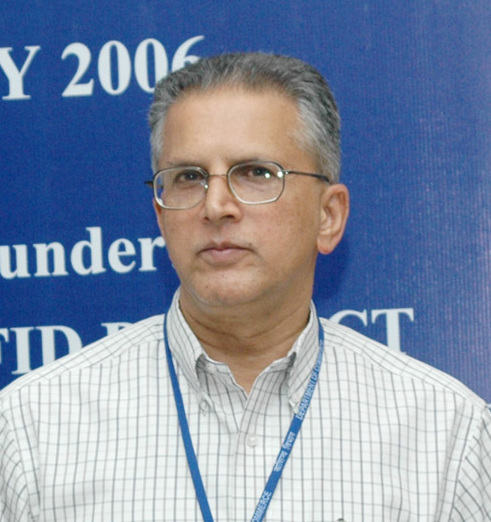
Gopal Krishna Pillai, I.A.S officer and former Home Secretary in the Government of India

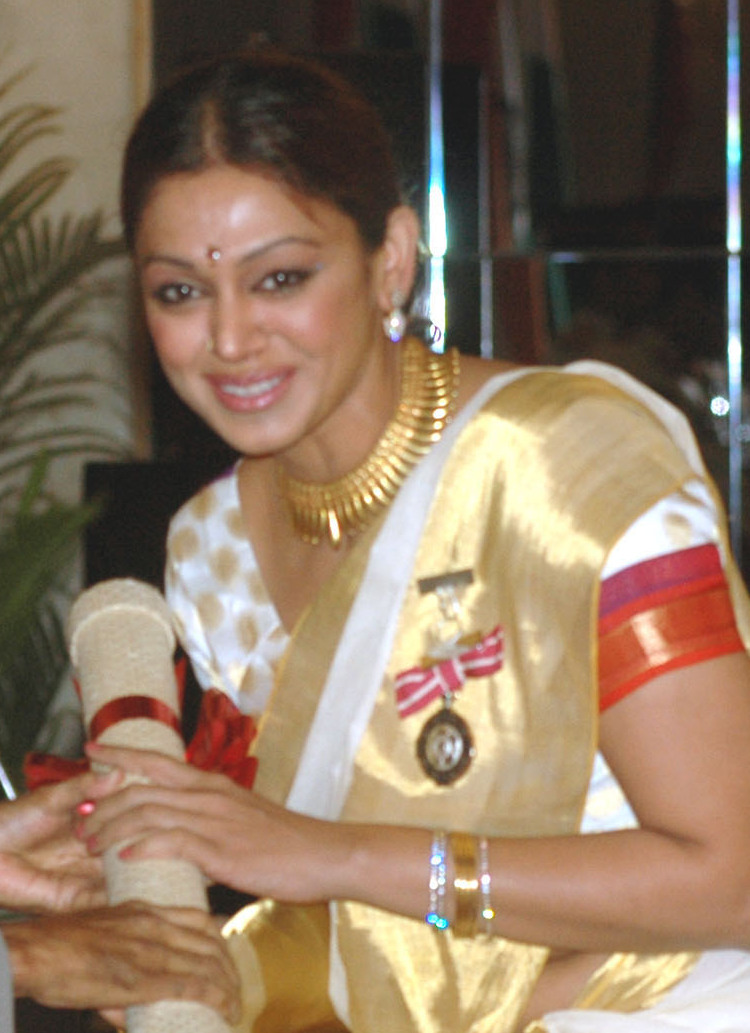
Shobana Chandrakumar Pillai, Indian actress

- B. Ravi Pillai (born 1953) Dubai-based Indian billionaire businessman
- Changampuzha Krishna Pillai (1911-1948) was a celebrated Malayalam poet from Kerala
- C. V. Raman Pillai (1858–1922), also known as C. V., was one of the major Indian novelists and playwrights and a pioneering playwright and novelist of Malayalam literature
- Devasahayam Pillai (1712–1752) was an Indian layman and martyr of the Catholic Church
- Divya Pillai Indian actress who appears in Malayalam films
- Elamkulam Kunjan Pillai (1904 – 1973), known as Elamkulam, was an Indian historian, linguist and academic from Kerala
- Janardhanan pillai (born 1946), also known as Janardhanan Nair, is an Indian actor, producer and a former Indian Air Force personnel who predominantly acts in Malayalam films
- Kollam G. K. Pillai (1934-2016), Indian actor
- K. M. Vasudevan Pillai (born 1946 in Kerala, India) is an Indian educationist, social entrepreneur, institution-builder, and philanthropist
- K. Shankar Pillai (1902–1989), better known as Shankar, was an Indian cartoonist
- Kumbalathu Sanku Pillai (1898-1969) Social reformer, politician and freedom fighter
- Mannathu Padmanabha Pillai (1878-1970) was an Indian social reformer and freedom fighter from the south-western state of Kerala. He is recognised as the founder of the Nair Service Society (NSS)
- Manu S. Pillai (born 1990), Indian historian and author
- Murali Pillai (1967) Singaporean politician and lawyer
- Nanoo Pillai (1827–1886) was a Travancore statesman who served as the Diwan of Travancore from 1877 to 1880.
- Nisha Pillai, Indian journalist based in London. She is a main news anchor for BBC World News
- N. Krishna Pillai (1916-1988) was an Indian dramatist, literary critic, translator and historian of Malayalam language
- N. N. Pillai (1918–1995) was an Indian playwright, actor, theatre director, orator, screenplay writer, lyricist and an I.N.A Freedom fighter
- Omchery N. N. Pillai (1924–2024) was an Indian Malayalam–language playwright, novelist and poet from Kerala
- Pattom A. Thanu Pillai (1885-1970) was an Indian politician and freedom fighter who served as the 2nd Chief Minister of Kerala from 1960 to 1962. He was considered as a central figure in Kerala politics
- Paravoor T. K. Narayana Pillai (1890-1971) was an Indian freedom fighter during the British Raj in India and was a member of the Indian National Congress (INC)
- P. Govinda Pillai (1926 – 2012) Indian politician
- P. S. Sreedharan Pillai (born 1954) is an Indian politician, attorney, and author, who is currently serving as the 19th and current Governor of Goa since 2021
- Rajan Pillai (1947 – 1995) was an Indian businessman from Kerala, popularly known as the Biscuit Baron
- Rajeev Pillai (born 1982) Indian actor in Malayalam cinema
- Ranj Pillai (born 1974) is a Canadian politician and premier of Yukon
- Rhea Pillai (born 1965) British model
- Shobana Chandrakumar Pillai (1970) is an Indian actress and Bharatanatyam dancer
- Swadeshabhimani Ramakrishna Pillai (1878–1916), journalist and political activist. Translated Karl Marx's biography into Malayalam
- Thakazhi Sivasankara Pillai (17 April 1912 – 10 April 1999) Indian novelist and short story writer of Malayalam literature
- V. N. Rajasekharan Pillai (born 1949) current Vice Chancellor of Indira Gandhi National Open University (IGNOU)
