= Pillai =

Pillai may refer to:

- Pillai (Kerala title), a title of nobility used by Nairs of Kerala, India
- Pillai of Pallichal, a title of the order of nobility in the former Travancore monarchy of India
- Pillai (surname), a surname used by different communities in Kerala, Tamil Nadu, and Sri Lanka
- Pillai (Tamil surname), a Tamil surname in Tamil Nadu and parts of Sri Lanka, traditionally associated with the Vellalar community

== See also ==
- Pilai, a Finnish bagpipe
