= Keeriparai =

- Neighbourhood
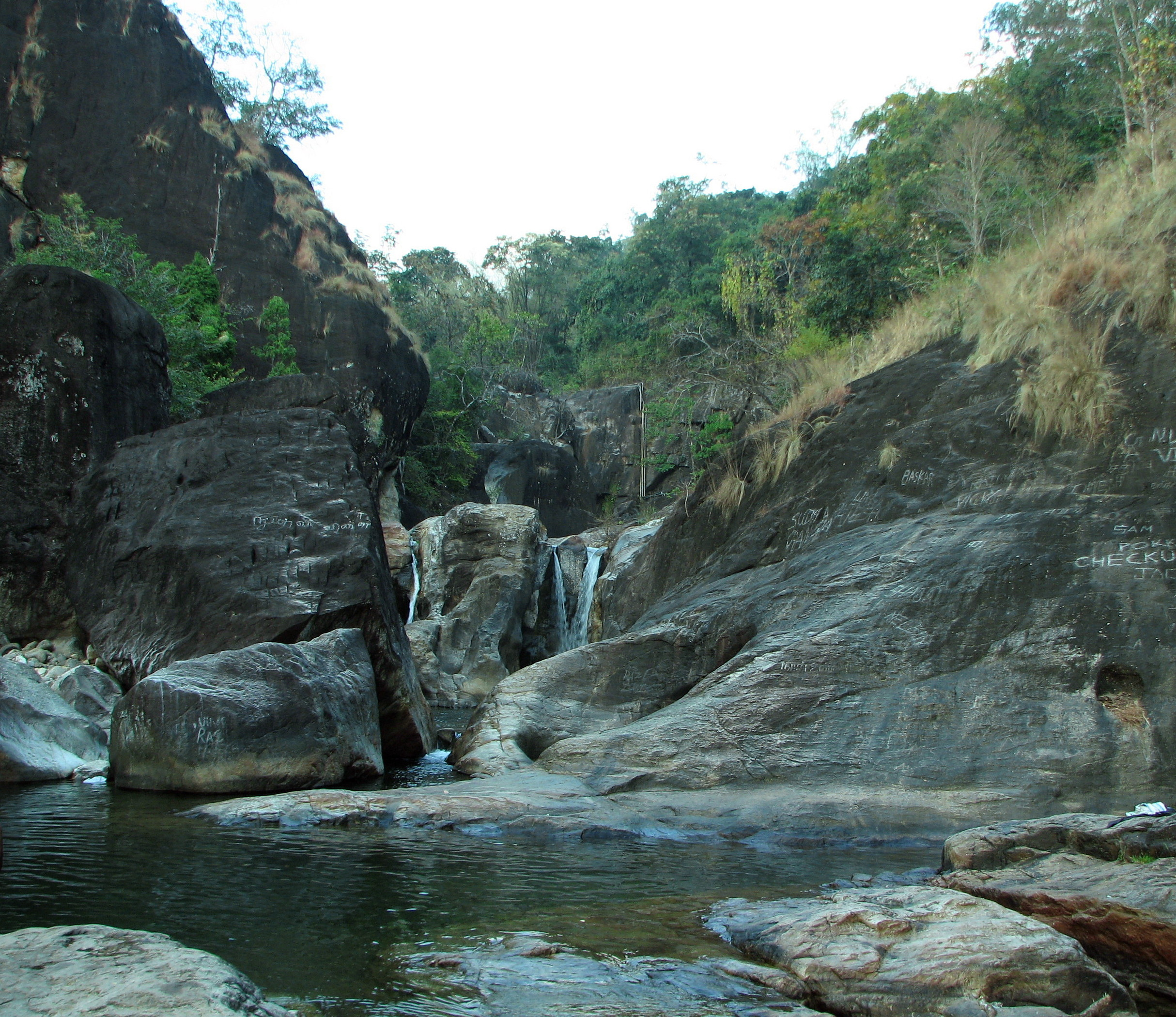

- Keeriparai (Tamil Nadu)
- Coordinates: 8°23′35.2″N 77°24′35.6″E
- Country: India
- State: Tamil Nadu
- Elevation: 267 m (876 ft)

Languages
  - Official: Tamil, English
  - Speech: Tamil, English
- Time zone: UTC+5:30 (IST)
- PIN: 629854
- Telephone Code: +914652
- Vehicle registration: TN 74 yy xxxx
- Neighbourhoods: Thittuvilai, Boothapandi, Vadasery, Nagercoil and Kulasekaram
- Local Body: Thovalai Panchayat Union
- LS: Kanniyakumari Lok Sabha constituency
- VS: Kanniyakumari Assembly constituency
- MP: Vijay Vasanth
- MLA: Thalavai Sundaram N

Keeriparai is a hillock area in Kanniyakumari district of Tamil Nadu state in the peninsular India. It is located at an altitude of about 267 m above the mean sea level with the geographical coordinates of 8°23′35.2″N 77°24′35.6″E (i.e., 8.393100°N, 77.409900°E). [[Thittuvilai][Boothapandi]], Vadasery, Nagercoil and Kulasekaram are some of the important neighbourhoods of Keeriparai. (Government-run) Arasu Rubber Corporation has a rubber factory in Keeriparai.

Keeriparai area falls under the Kanniyakumari Assembly constituency. The winner of the election held in the year 2021 as the member of its assembly constituency is Thalavai Sundaram N. Also, this area belongs to Kanniyakumari Lok Sabha constituency. Vijay Vasanth won the 2019 and 2021 elections, as the member of its Lok Sabha constituency.
