= S. Austin =

Indian politician (born 1959)

S. Austin Daniel

Member of the Tamil Nadu Legislative Assembly
- Incumbent
- Assumed office 6 May 2026
- Preceded by: M. R. Gandhi
- Constituency: Nagercoil
- In office 2016–2021
- Preceded by: N. Suresh Rajan
- Succeeded by: N. Thalavai Sundaram
- Constituency: Kanniyakumari
- In office 2001–2006
- Preceded by: M. Moses
- Succeeded by: A. Rajan
- Constituency: Nagercoil

Personal details
- Born: 1959 (age 66–67) Tamil Nadu
- Party: Dravida Munnetra Kazhagam
- Occupation: Politician

S. Austin Daniel (born 1959) is an Indian politician from Tamil Nadu. He is a three time member of the Tamil Nadu Legislative Assembly. He was elected from the Nagercoil Assembly constituency in Kanyakumari district representing the Dravida Munnetra Kazhagam.

Austin first became an MLA winning the 2001 Tamil Nadu Legislative Assembly election. Later he was elected from Kanyakumari constituency in 2016 election. In the 2026 Tamil Nadu Legislative Assembly election he won from the Nagercoil Assembly constituency representing the DMK. He polled 69,880 and defeated his nearest rival, G. Bervin Kings of the Tamilaga Vettri Kazhagam, by a margin of 7,570 votes.

== Electoral performance ==
=== MLA ===
Electoral results
Year	Constituency	Party	Result	Votes	Vote %
2001	Nagercoil	MADMK	Won	48,583	44.11
2006	Nagercoil	Indian Victory Party	Lost	31,609	26.49
2016	Kanyakumari	DMK	Won	89,023	42.41
2021	Kanyakumari	DMK	Lost	93,618	41.59
2026	Nagercoil	DMK	Won	69,880	35.60

=== Member of Parliament ===
Electoral results
Year	Constituency	Party	Result	Votes	Vote %
2009	Kanyakumari	DMDK	Lost	68,472	8.94
