= Bastiampillai =

Bastiampillai is both a given name and a surname. Notable people with the name include:

- Bastiampillai Anthonipillai Thomas (1886–1964), Sri Lankan Roman Catholic priest
- Bastiampillai Deogupillai (1917–2003), Sri Lankan Tamil priest
- Trevin Bastiampillai (born 1985), Canadian cricketer
