= M. C. Balan =

Indian politician

M. C. Balan was an Indian politician and former Member of the Legislative Assembly. He was elected to the Tamil Nadu legislative assembly as a Dravida Munnetra Kazhagam candidate from the Nagercoil constituency in Kanyakumari district in the 1967 election. He was defeated by A. Chidambaranatha Nadar in the 1962 election in the Nagercoil legislative assembly constituency. He was defeated by K. Kamaraj in the Nagercoil parliamentary constituency in the 1971 Indian general election.
