= Ettuveetil Pillamar =

Nair aristocrats in Travancore

The Ettuveetil Pillamar (Lords of the Eight Noble Houses) were Nair nobles from eight ruling Houses in erstwhile Venadu kingdom in the present-day Kerala, India. They were associated with the Padmanabhaswamy temple in Venadu kingdom and the Ettara Yogam. Their power and wealth grew until Marthanda Varma (1706–1758).

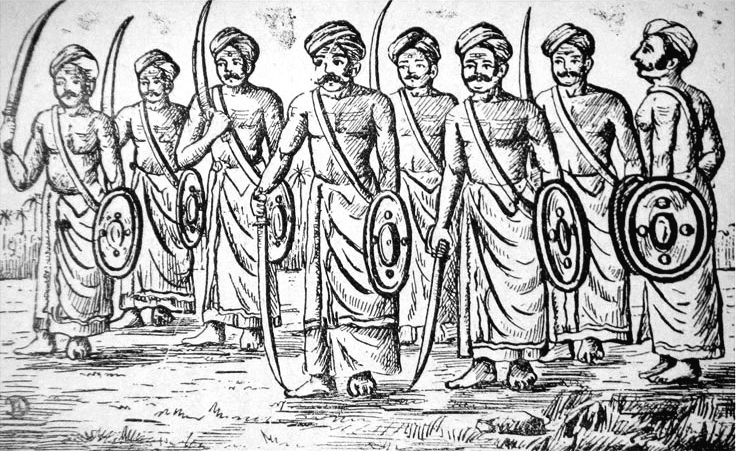
An Illustration of Ettuveettil Pillais (1878)

== The Eight Houses ==
The Ettuveetil Pillamar were known according to the villages in which they resided and all held the title of Pillai. The Eight Lords were Kazhakoottathu Pillai, Ramanamadhom Pillai, Chempazhanty Pillai, Kudamon Pillai, Venganoor Pillai, Marthandalayam Pillai, Pallichal Pillai and Kolathur Pillai. Kazhakkoottam and Chempazhanthi lie to the north of Thiruvananthapuram, the capital city, while Venganoor lies to the south, between Balaramapuram and Kovalam.

== Traditional accounts ==
=== Origin ===
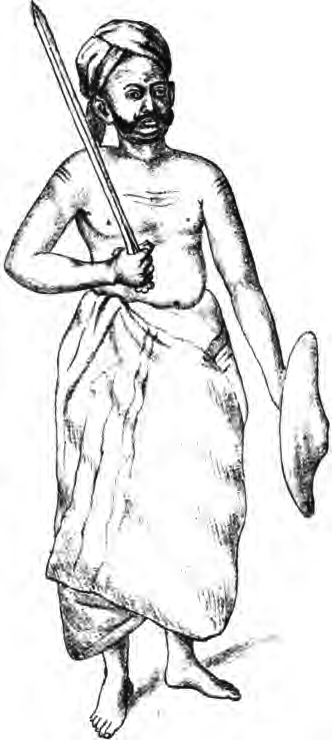
An Ettuveetil Pillai

Ettuveetil Pillamar were the leaders of the land and ‘tharakootams’ known as ‘Arunootavar’ (the military setup of Nairs) established for maintaining law and justice in Venadu (kingdom). They were the Governors of provinces of the country. They had the power to exercise control over the king also. They gradually grew from landlords to powerful chiefs and allied themselves with the Ettara Yogam. The Ettara Yogam ('King's Council of Eight and a half'), presided by the Pushpanjali Swamiyar was an association consisting of Potti families, Nair family and the King administered the Sri Padmanabhaswamy Temple of present-dayThiruvananthapuram, Kerala. The lands and properties of the temple were divided into eight parts and each was placed by the Yogam under one of the Pillai as governor. They soon started opposing the king openly and bringing more and more Madampis or nobles under their influence.

=== The Eight lords and Marthanda Varma ===
Marthanda Varma, the last king of Venad and the first king of Travancore. was born in 1706 to the younger of the two adopted princesses of 1689. Right from his childhood he had to live constantly in hiding, due to the Pillamar. Several assassination bids were made on his life. In 1728 an assassination attempt was made on the life of his sister and her son, the later Dharma Raja. However it was in 1729, when the Rajah Rama Varma, died that actual war was declared.

The late Rajah left two sons, Padmanabhan and Raman Thampi and a daughter Ummini Thankachi. These children of the late king known as the Kunju Thampis now staked claim to the throne, in spite of the prevailing Marumakkathayam law (which said that a king would be succeeded by his sister's eldest son). Recognizing a dangerous foe in the intelligent and decisive Marthanda Varma, the Pillamar supported the Kunju Thampis. They furnished them with enough money and men to seek aid from the Pandyas of Madurai. However Marthanda Varma managed to avert war by bribing away the Pandyan army. Soon after this Padmanabhan and Raman Thampi were captured and killed at Nagercoil Palace. (It may be stated that according to a popular folklore, Marthanda Varma's enmity towards the Kunju Thampimar was because of their refusal to allow him to marry their sister. It is said that Ummini Thankachi killed herself after the execution of her brothers to escape Marthanda Varma.)

In this entire episode Subhadra, the niece of the Thirumukom (Pillai) of Kudamon, plays an important part in betraying the Eight. She was a brave lady but treacherous and it was she who divulged secrets of the Eight to Marthanda Varmas people which made them victorious. However her uncle killed her after the battle for her treachery.

The Pillamar were initially deterred by the fate of the Thampis, for they did not expect Marthanda Varma to kill his own cousins. However, soon after this, they plotted once again to murder the king but intelligence of this reached the king. On the day of the Arrat festival when the murder was to take place, Marthanda Varma appeared with an escort strong enough to cow down the Pillamar. But having received proof of the intention of the Pillamar to murder him they were all rounded up and tried soon after this.

The Eight were either killed or exiled after sufficient evidence of conspiracy and murder was procured. Their houses were dug up (Kulamthondal - a common punishment of the time) and all their assets and armies seized by the victorious Marthanda Varma. Their women and children were sold to the Mukkuvar fishermen of the coast. The two palaces at Thiruvananthapuram, known as Ramanamadhom and Thevarathu Koikal were constructed from the wood and material of the palaces of the Pillamar. The Travancore State Manual written by scholar V. Nagam Aiya concludes by saying,

Thus ended the long tale of crime and bloodshed committed by the lawless band of Ettuveetil Pillai and the Madampimar who molested the land for a period of two centuries and more

== Modern views ==
Later historians have challenged the traditional stories which were based on legend and folklore. While there is no doubt about the existence of anti-royal nobles before Marthanda Varma, as well as frequent conflicts between the Sri Padmanabhaswamy Temple managers and the king, many of the events of the past might been not entirely accurate.

The temple lands were managed by a group of nobles known as Madathil Pillamar, often mistaken for the Ettuveetil Pillamar. Earlier historians stated that the King had no authority over the temple and the Ettara Yogam and Pillamar were outside his control. However temple documents show that it was the king who appointed the highest dignitary of the temple, known as the Swamiyar. In fact, the authority of the king is considered to have been greatly valued for the records show the Yogam applying to the king for permission in trivial matters such as appointment of Temple sweepers. Another contradiction found is in the fact that the Pillamar influenced the tenants of the temple lands. However the temple lands all lay to the south of Thiruvananthapuram where there were other influential nobles, whereas the bulk of the Pillamar lived to the north. Records show clashes between Temple managers and the king's men but in none of these are the Pillamar mentioned. Another contradiction lies in the statement that since the 16th century the kings were mere puppets of the Yogam and Pillamar. During this period the Venad kings won victories over the mighty Vijayanagar Empire and the Thirumala Nayaks, which, it is asserted, could not have been possible under a puppet king.

A major disagreement is registered regarding the aim of the Pillamar to extirpate the royal family. Even if they succeeded in killing the Royal family at Thiruvananthapuram, there were the other collateral branches at Nedumangad and Kottarakara, places where the Pillamar had no following. It may be noted that all these branches participated in the meetings and management of the Temple and hence were active in Thiruvananthapuram also. In the document of 1730 regarding the execution of the Pillamar the name used for the conspirators is Ettuveetil Madampimar and not Pillamar. Besides, of the eight Pillais, only Kazhakoothathu Pillai and Kulathur Pillai are mentioned, the remainder being totally different individuals. The remaining six families are not mentioned at all, and it is improbable that the King who personally made investigations would let any of them go free.

Further important revelations made by the documents of the Temple are with regard to Aditya Varma and Umayamma Rani. The Temple records which refer to minor events such as appointment of sweepers in the temple have not stated anything on the palace of Aditya Varma being burnt down. Also the story that Aditya Varma was poisoned to death is positively disproved, for the temple records clearly state that Aditya Varma died at Padmanabhapuram in the Darpakulangara Palace and was cremated at Thiruvattar. The King had died a natural death. Another significant fact that has come to light is that Umayamma Rani had no children at all and hence the story of the murder of her five children is disproved. The Royal family consisted only of Umayamma Rani, a Senior Rani and Ravi Varma, the son of the Senior Rani. In fact, Umayamma had two adopted sons from 1677 who were however not in the line of succession.

Thus many of the crimes for which the Pillamar are said to have been punished were positively disproved. It is clear that there did exist refractory nobles of immense power and that Marthanda Varma did put an end to their authority and made that of the king supreme, but most of the stories about the Pillamar were found to be false.

== See also ==
- Nair dynasty
- Pillai (Nair title)
- Thirumukom
- Battle of Colachel
- Valiyasala Mahadeva Temple
- Marthandavarma (novel)
