= Battle of Kandalur Salai =

Military assault carried out the Cholas

Battle of Kandalur salai Fall of Kandalur salai
- Part of Chola Expansions under Rajaraja I (late 10th century CE)
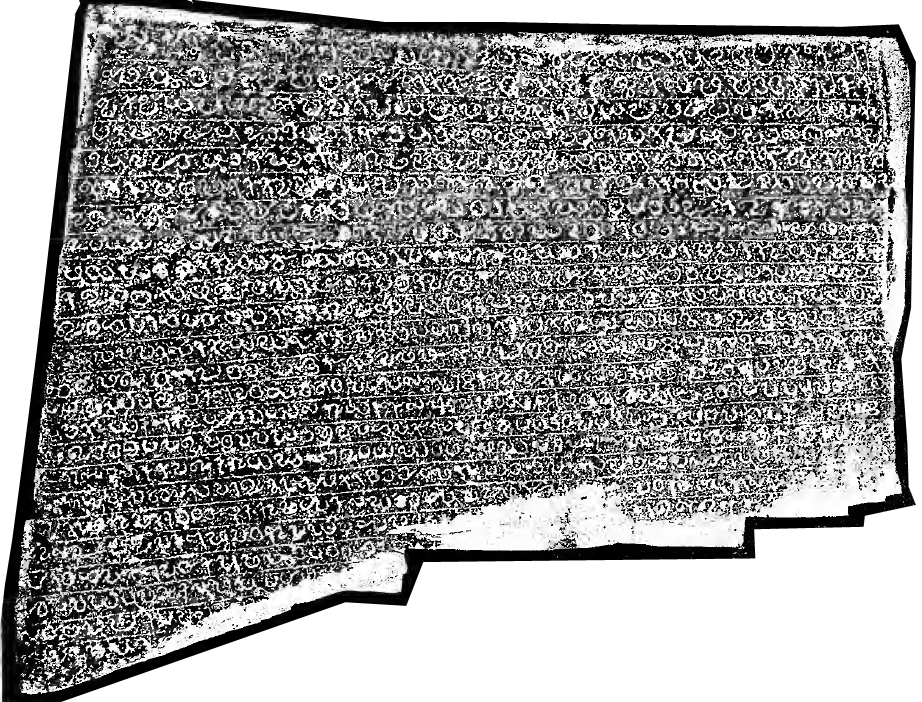
- Inscription of Chola emperor Rajaraja from Suchindram, Kanyakumari (15th regnal year)
Date	c. 988 CE
Location	Kandalur, south Kerala
Result	Decisive Chola victory
Territorial changes	Fall of Kandalur

Belligerents
(Chola dynasty) Chola Empire	Chera Kingdom (Mahodayapuram) (?) or Pandya Kingdom (?)

Commanders and leaders
(Chola dynasty) Rajaraja Chola I	Bhaskara Ravi (?); Pandya ruler (?)

Units involved
(Chola dynasty) Chola Army (?); (Chola dynasty) Chola Navy	Chera Army (?); Chera Navy (?)

Casualties and losses
Unknown	Fall of Kandalur

The battle of Kandalur salai (c. 988 CE), also spelled Kanthaloor salai, was a decisive military assault carried out the Cholas under Rajaraja I (985—1014 CE) against the roadstead at Kandalur in south Kerala.

The fall of Kandalur stands as one of the earliest victories of Rajaraja's reign and is often included among his southern campaigns against the Cheras and the Pandyas. Kandalur is generally identified as Valiya Salai, located in the city of Trivandrum.

The phrase "Kandalur-salai-kalamaruttaruli" is again used to refer to the same feat in the reigns of three later Chola rulers — Rajendra, Rajadhiraja and Kulottunga. Historian Nilakanta Sastri notably interpreted the phrase to mean that the fleet at the roadstead of Kandalur was destroyed or overcome.

== Assessment of the phrase ==
=== Different interpretations ===
Early south Indian historians expressed differing views regarding the nature of the Kandalur "salai", variously identifying it as a Brahmin feeding house, a royal hall, a naval base/roadstead, or other types of "institution". Consequently, the meaning of the phrase "Kandalur-salai-kalamaruttaruli" was also interpreted in different ways. Historian K. A. Nilakanta Sastri notably explains the phrase as "destroyed or overcame [aruttu] the fleet [kalam] in the roadstead of Kandalur".

1. E. Hultzsch
  - "Destroyed ships [kalam] at Kandalur" or
  - "Cut the vessel [kalam] in the hall at Kandalur" or
  - "Built a jewell-like hall at Kandalur"
2. T. A. Gopinatha Rao -
  - "Transferred the kalam [Brahmin feeding] at Kandalur Feeding House [salai]"
  - "Discontinued the kalam [Brahmin feeding] at Kandalur Feeding House [salai]"
3. S. Desikavinayakam Pillai - "Regulated of the kalam [Brahmin feeding] at Kandalur Feeding House [salai]"
4. K. A. Nilakanta Sastri - "Destroyed or overcame the fleet in the roadstead of Kandalur"
5. Elamkulam P. N. Kunjan Pillai - "Discontinued/Destroyed the Brahmin feeding [kalam] at Kandalur"
6. M. G. S. Narayanan/Kesavan Veluthat - "Destroyed the Brahmin ghatika [=salai; military training centre] at Kandalur".
7. Chengam hero stone inscription - "Destroyed ships [kalam] at Kandalur"

== Location of Kandalur ==
The exact location of Kandalur remains a subject of scholarly debate. It is generally identified within the city of Trivandrum (Valiya Salai or Valiassala Temple), as suggested by Gopinatha Rao.

It is also possible that the original Kandalur salai was situated near the Ay capital at Vizhinjam (Venkayya, SII; II), and that the deity (the Kandalur Mahadeva) was later relocated to Trivandrum following the Chola raids of the 10th and 11th centuries. A village (Kandalur) approximately 20 km east of Vizhinjam notably has a Shiva temple known as "Kandalur Salai".

== Fall of Kandalur ==
The fall of Kandalur on the Malabar Coast was perhaps the first military success of emperor Rajaraja's reign. This victory was commemorated in the well-known phrase "Kandalur-salai-kalamarutta", which precedes Rajaraja's name in several of his inscriptions from the 4th regnal year (c. 988 CE) onwards.

- The Kandalur salai belonged to the Ay ruler, a vassal of the Pandya king at Madurai, in the mid-860s (c. 865 CE).
- It is possible that, at the time of the Chola raid, Kandalur was under the control of the medieval Chera ruler of Kerala, Bhaskara Ravi. If so, the battle may be viewed as part of Rajaraja's early campaigns against the Cheras, the Pandyas, and the rulers of Sri Lanka.
- However, some historians suggest that Kandalur, which is claimed in later Chola inscriptions (c. 1048 CE) to have belonged to the Cheras of Kerala, may in fact have been held by the Pandyas when it was attacked by Rajaraja I (Venkayya, SII; II).

Following the fall of Kandalur, Chola inscriptions started appearing in southern Travancore from the 8th regnal year onward, beginning with the Darshanankoppu record. However, Chola records in the Pandya country appear only two years later, suggesting that southern Travancore may have come under Chola control before the Pandya country did (the capture of the Pandya ruler Amarabhujanga is famously recorded in the Tiruvalangadu Plates). The accounts in the Tiruvalangadu Plates suggest that the Cholas conducted multiple campaigns in the region.

=== Chengam inscription ===
A hero-stone inscription, dated to the 14th regnal year of Rajaraja I, was unearthed at Chengam in Thiruvannamalai in November 2009. It supports the view that a military engagement did indeed take place at Kandalur. The inscription contains a eulogy describing Rajaraja I as having "beheaded the Malai Alarkal of Kandalur Salai". According to the newspaper report, it also states that Rajaraja I built a mantapa platform there, split in two a naval vessel belonging to the Chera king, and destroyed a number of "boats".

== References to Kandalur ==
A range of inscriptional and literary sources refer to Kandalur. The earliest reference occurs in c. 865/66 CE in the Trivandrum Huzur Office or Parthivapuram Plates of the Ay ruler Karunanthadakkan, a vassal of the Pandya king Srimara Srivallabha. The first Chola reference to the fall of Kandalur appears in c. 988 CE (4th regnal year), in the phrase "Kandalur-salai-kalamarutta".

Inscriptional references to Chola campaigns in Kerala under Rajadhiraja or Rajendra, dated to around 1018–19 CE, state that the Cholas "confined the undaunted king of Venatu to Che[ra?]natu … and put on a fresh garland of Vanchi after capturing Kantalur Salai, while the strong Villavan [the Chera king] hid himself in terror inside the jungle". The Velur and Tiruppangili inscriptions of Rajadhiraja I Chola mention Kandalur as "Cheralan Velaikkelu Kantalur Chalai" (30th regnal year; c. 1048 CE; TAS II, 19). The Kalingattupparani (III.21) notably records Kulottunga Chola's victory over the Chera Bow Emblem and the Chola taking of Kandalur, while the inscriptions of Jatavarman Parakrama Pandya refer to the fall of Kandalur (c. 1102–c. 1118 CE) on behalf of his Chola overlord, Vikrama Chola.
