= Nagercoil Assembly constituency =

One of the 234 State Legislative Assembly Constituencies in Tamil Nadu, in India

Coordinates: 8.17°N 77.43°E

Nagercoil
- Constituency No. 230 for the Tamil Nadu Legislative Assembly
- Nagercoil Assembly constituency

Constituency details
- Country: India
- Region: South India
- State: Tamil Nadu
- District: Kanniyakumari
- Lok Sabha constituency: Kanniyakumari
- Established: 1951
- Total electors: 2,59,361
- Reservation: None

Member of Legislative Assembly
- 17th Tamil Nadu Legislative Assembly
- Incumbent S. Austin
- Party: DMK
- Alliance: SPA
- Elected year: 2026

Nagercoil Assembly constituency is an assembly constituency located in Kanniyakumari Lok Sabha constituency in Kanyakumari district in Tamil Nadu. It is one of the 234 State Legislative Assembly Constituencies in Tamil Nadu, in India.

== Members of Legislative Assembly ==
Year	Member	Political party
Travancore-Cochin
1952	C. Sankar	Indian National Congress
1954	D. Anantaraman	Independent
Madras State
1957	A. Chidambaranatha Nadar	Indian National Congress
1962	A. Chidambaranatha Nadar	Indian National Congress
1967	M. C. Balan	Dravida Munnetra Kazhagam
Tamil Nadu
1971	M. Moses	Swatantra Party
1977	M. Vincent	All India Anna Dravida Munnetra Kazhagam
1980	M. Vincent	All India Anna Dravida Munnetra Kazhagam
1984	S. Retnaraj	Dravida Munnetra Kazhagam
1989	M. Moses	Indian National Congress
1991	M. Moses	Indian National Congress
1996	M. Moses	Indian National Congress
2001	S. Austin	MGR Anna Dravida Munnetra Kazhagam
2006	A. Rajan	Dravida Munnetra Kazhagam
2011	A. Nanjil Murugesan	All India Anna Dravida Munnetra Kazhagam
2016	N. Suresh Rajan	Dravida Munnetra Kazhagam
2021	M. R. Gandhi	Bharatiya Janata Party
2026	S. Austin	Dravida Munnetra Kazhagam

== Election results ==
Vote share of winning candidates
2026	35.6%
2021	48.21%
2016	38.87%
2011	40.01%
2006	38.01%
2001	44.11%
1996	48.40%
1991	56.81%
1989	34.48%
1984	47.86%
1980	54.76%
1977	36.45%
1971	48.09%
1967	55.05%
1962	54.13%
1957	63.70%
1954	43.14%
1952	24.01%

=== 2026 ===
2026 Tamil Nadu Legislative Assembly election: Nagercoil
Party	Candidate	Votes	%	±%
DMK	Austin	69,880	35.60	▼6.28
TVK	Bervin Kings. G	62,310	31.75	New
BJP	Gandhi. M.R	52,355	26.67	▼21.54
NOTA	NOTA	447	0.23	▼0.27
Margin of victory		7,570	3.85	▼2.49
Turnout		1,96,280	75.68	▲7.56
Registered electors		2,59,361		▼11,041
DMK gain from BJP		Swing	▼6.28	

=== 2021 ===
2021 Tamil Nadu Legislative Assembly election: Nagercoil
Party	Candidate	Votes	%	±%
BJP	M. R. Gandhi	88,804	48.21	+21.44
DMK	N. Suresh Rajan	77,135	41.88	+3.01
MNM	S. Maria Jacob Stani Raja	4,037	2.19	New
AMMK	I. Ammu Anto	1,094	0.59	New
NOTA	NOTA	930	0.50	−0.53
Margin of victory		11,669	6.34	−5.76
Turnout		184,185	68.12	2.37
Rejected ballots		259	0.14	
Registered electors		270,402		
BJP gain from DMK		Swing	9.35	

=== 2016 ===
2016 Tamil Nadu Legislative Assembly election: Nagercoil
Party	Candidate	Votes	%	±%
DMK	N. Suresh Rajan	67,369	38.87	+3.44
BJP	M. R. Gandhi	46,413	26.78	+3.91
AIADMK	Nanjil A. Murugesan	45,824	26.44	−13.57
MDMK	S. Christin Rani	5,803	3.35	New
NOTA	NOTA	1,802	1.04	New
Left Democratic Front	Dr. M. S. Jackson	1,411	0.81	New
Margin of victory		20,956	12.09	7.52
Turnout		173,324	65.74	−4.37
Registered electors		263,633		
DMK gain from AIADMK		Swing	-1.14	

=== 2011 ===
2011 Tamil Nadu Legislative Assembly election: Nagercoil
Party	Candidate	Votes	%	±%
AIADMK	Nanjil A. Murugesan	58,819	40.01	New
DMK	R. Mahesh	52,092	35.43	−2.57
BJP	Pon Radhakrishnan	33,623	22.87	+13.86
Margin of victory		6,727	4.58	−6.94
Turnout		209,685	70.11	7.72
Registered electors		147,019		
AIADMK gain from DMK		Swing	2.00	

=== 2006 ===
2006 Tamil Nadu Legislative Assembly election: Nagercoil
Party	Candidate	Votes	%	±%
DMK	A. Rajan	45,354	38.01	New
Indian Victory Party	S. Austin	31,609	26.49	New
MDMK	S. Retnaraj	21,990	18.43	+6.14
BJP	T. Udhaya Kumar	10,752	9.01	New
Independent	M. Babu	4,098	3.43	New
DMDK	A. V. M. Lion Rajan	3,783	3.17	New
ABHM	P. Madhu Soothana Perumal	695	0.58	New
Margin of victory		13,745	11.52	8.19
Turnout		119,334	62.39	12.18
Registered electors		191,270		
DMK gain from MADMK		Swing	-6.10	

=== 2001 ===
2001 Tamil Nadu Legislative Assembly election: Nagercoil
Party	Candidate	Votes	%	±%
MADMK	S. Austin	48,583	44.11	New
TMC(M)	M. Moses	44,921	40.78	New
MDMK	S. Retnaraj	13,531	12.28	+1.82
Independent	M. Ramesh	1,872	1.70	New
JD(U)	R. Kathiresan	742	0.67	New
Margin of victory		3,662	3.32	−23.65
Turnout		110,147	50.21	−9.21
Registered electors		219,583		
MADMK gain from TMC(M)		Swing	-4.29	

=== 1996 ===
1996 Tamil Nadu Legislative Assembly election: Nagercoil
Party	Candidate	Votes	%	±%
TMC(M)	M. Moses	51,086	48.40	New
BJP	S. Velpandian	22,608	21.42	+5.46
INC	V. Seluvai Antony	15,368	14.56	−42.26
MDMK	S. Retnaraj	11,046	10.46	New
AIIC(T)	R. Rathakrishnan	4,153	3.93	New
PMK	S. Suresh	570	0.54	New
Margin of victory		28,478	26.98	−3.31
Turnout		105,560	59.42	2.32
Registered electors		185,144		
TMC(M) gain from INC		Swing	-8.42	

=== 1991 ===
1991 Tamil Nadu Legislative Assembly election: Nagercoil
Party	Candidate	Votes	%	±%
INC	M. Moses	56,363	56.81	+22.34
DMK	S. Retnaraj	26,311	26.52	−1.32
BJP	K. A. Kumaravel	15,833	15.96	+14.06
Margin of victory		30,052	30.29	23.65
Turnout		99,205	57.10	−9.69
Registered electors		177,734		
INC hold		Swing	22.34	

=== 1989 ===
1989 Tamil Nadu Legislative Assembly election: Nagercoil
Party	Candidate	Votes	%	±%
INC	M. Moses	35,647	34.48	New
DMK	P. Dharmaraj	28,782	27.84	−20.02
Independent	R. Rathjakrishnan	21,090	20.40	New
AIADMK	S. Thangamony	12,203	11.80	−34.59
Independent	A. Sivathanu	2,497	2.42	New
BJP	M. R. Gandhi	1,964	1.90	New
Margin of victory		6,865	6.64	5.18
Turnout		103,391	66.79	−0.07
Registered electors		156,744		
INC gain from DMK		Swing	-13.38	

=== 1984 ===
1984 Tamil Nadu Legislative Assembly election: Nagercoil
Party	Candidate	Votes	%	±%
DMK	S. Retnaraj	41,572	47.86	+6.03
AIADMK	S. Jagatheeson	40,301	46.39	−8.36
Independent	A. Navis	2,427	2.79	New
Independent	S. Lekshmanan Pillay	1,081	1.24	New
Independent	S. Devadasan	892	1.03	New
Margin of victory		1,271	1.46	−11.46
Turnout		86,868	66.86	11.44
Registered electors		135,489		
DMK gain from AIADMK		Swing	-6.90	

=== 1980 ===
1980 Tamil Nadu Legislative Assembly election: Nagercoil
Party	Candidate	Votes	%	±%
AIADMK	M. Vincent	39,328	54.76	+18.3
DMK	A. Thiraviam	30,045	41.83	+24.5
JP	A. Kuruzmichcal	1,512	2.11	New
BJP	M. R. Gandhi	693	0.96	New
Margin of victory		9,283	12.92	12.66
Turnout		71,824	55.42	−0.58
Registered electors		130,424		
AIADMK hold		Swing	18.30	

=== 1977 ===
1977 Tamil Nadu Legislative Assembly election: Nagercoil
Party	Candidate	Votes	%	±%
AIADMK	M. Vincent	26,973	36.45	New
JP	P. Muhammed Ismail	26,780	36.19	New
DMK	G. C. Michael Raj	12,824	17.33	−30.01
INC	M. A. James	6,721	9.08	New
Independent	Poomedai S. Lakshmanan Pillay	409	0.55	New
Margin of victory		193	0.26	−0.49
Turnout		73,994	56.00	−17.75
Registered electors		132,870		
AIADMK gain from SWA		Swing	-11.63	

=== 1971 ===
1971 Tamil Nadu Legislative Assembly election: Nagercoil
Party	Candidate	Votes	%	±%
SWA	M. Moses	34,726	48.09	New
DMK	G. Christopher	34,185	47.34	−7.71
CPI(M)	P. Gopinath	3,304	4.58	New
Margin of victory		541	0.75	−9.34
Turnout		72,215	73.75	−4.38
Registered electors		101,962		
SWA gain from DMK		Swing	-6.96	

=== 1967 ===
1967 Madras Legislative Assembly election: Nagercoil
Party	Candidate	Votes	%	±%
DMK	M. C. Balan	36,502	55.05	+29.76
INC	T. Nadar	29,810	44.95	−9.18
Margin of victory		6,692	10.09	−18.76
Turnout		66,312	78.13	7.71
Registered electors		86,263		
DMK gain from INC		Swing	0.91	

=== 1962 ===
1962 Madras Legislative Assembly election: Nagercoil
Party	Candidate	Votes	%	±%
INC	A. Chidambaranatha Nadar	37,079	54.13	−9.57
DMK	M. C. Balan	17,318	25.28	New
CPI	R. K. Ram	14,098	20.58	−10.01
Margin of victory		19,761	28.85	−4.26
Turnout		68,495	70.42	−6.00
Registered electors		99,408		
INC hold		Swing	-9.57	

=== 1957 ===
1957 Madras Legislative Assembly election: Nagercoil
Party	Candidate	Votes	%	±%
INC	A. Chidambaranatha Nadar	44,073	63.70	New
CPI	C. Sankar	21,163	30.59	New
Independent	Muthu Wamy	2,949	4.26	New
Independent	Doraswamy Nadar	999	1.44	New
Margin of victory		22,910	33.11	
Turnout		69,184	76.42	
Registered electors		90,534		
INC gain from TTNC		Swing		

=== 1954 ===
1954 Travancore-Cochin Legislative Assembly election: Nagercoil
Party	Candidate	Votes	%	±%
TTNC	D. Anantaraman	14,063	43.14	+21.75
CPI	C. Sankar	10,468	32.11	New
INC	Sree V. Das Nadar S.	6,142	18.84	+13.06
Independent	Sivathanu Pillai M.	1,923	5.90	New
Margin of victory		3,595	11.03	{{{change}}}
Turnout		32,596	72.23	{{{change}}}
Registered electors		45,126		
TTNC gain from Independent		Swing		

=== 1952 ===
1952 Travancore-Cochin Legislative Assembly election: Nagercoil
Party	Candidate	Votes	%	±%
Independent	C. Sankar	6,280	24.01	New
TTNC	D. Thomas	5,595	21.39	+21.39
Independent	D. Anantaraman	5,453	20.85	New
TTP	P. S. Moni	4,082	15.61	New
INC	Thanumalaya Perumal Pillai	1,513	5.78	+5.78
SP	V. Markandan Pillai	1,470	5.62	New
Independent	K. Ananthakishnan	1,219	4.66	New
Independent	R. Ramalinga Panickar	542	2.07	New
Margin of victory		685	2.62	{{{change}}}
Turnout		26,154	69.10	{{{change}}}
Registered electors		37,849		
Independent win (new seat)				
