= M. R. Gandhi =

Indian politician

M.R. Gandhi
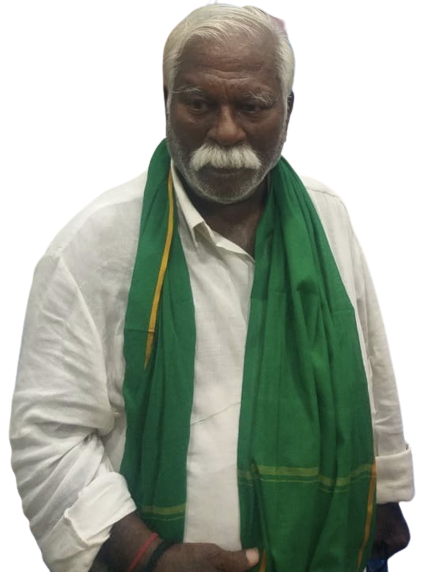

Member of the Tamil Nadu Legislative Assembly
- In office 12 May 2021 – 4 May 2026
- Preceded by: N. Suresh Rajan
- Succeeded by: S. Austin
- Constituency: Nagercoil

Vice President, Bharatiya Janata Party-Tamil Nadu
- In office 2016 - 2020

Personal details
- Born: Mavilai Ramasamy Gandhi; 25 July 1945 (age 80) Kanyakumari district
- Party: Bharatiya Janata Party
- Other political affiliations: Jana Sangh

Mavilai Ramasamy Gandhi (born 25 July 1945) is an Indian politician and a member of the Tamil Nadu Legislative Assembly from Nagercoil. He belongs to the Bharatiya Janata Party. He is the former vice-president of Bharatiya Janata Party, Tamil Nadu.

== Early life and education ==
Gandhi was born into an agricultural family in Kanyakumari district of Tamil Nadu. He obtained his Bachelor's degree from Scott Christian College at Madurai Kamaraj University in 1967. Gandhi remains unmarried.

== Political career ==
He played a pivotal role in establishing the Hindu nationalist organisation, Bharatiya Jana Sangh in Kanyakumari. He was one of the leaders of Rashtriya Swayamsevak Sangh in Kanyakumari district.

In 1967, he was the Kanyakumari district president of Jana Sangh and in 1975 he was the Tamil Nadu state secretary of the party. He was also jailed during The Emergency. He served as Tamil Nadu state BJP vice-president from 2016 and 2020.

He was assaulted by a gang with sickles when he was going for a walk on 21 April 2013 and suffered multiple injuries in this attempt to murder him.

He unsuccessfully contested from Colachel in 1984 and Nagercoil in 2006. Gandhi contested the 2021 Tamil Nadu Legislative Assembly election and won against DMK's former Minister N. Suresh Rajan by a margin of 11,669 votes.

== Electoral performance ==
=== Assembly Elections ===
| Election | Party | Constituency | Result | Votes gained | Vote % |
|---|---|---|---|---|---|
| 1980 | Janata Party | Nagercoil | Lost | 693 | 0.96% |
| 1984 | Bharatiya Janata Party | Colachel | Lost | 32,996 | 38.64% |
| 2006 | Bharatiya Janata Party | Colachel | Lost | 29,321 | 36.75% |
| 2011 | Bharatiya Janata Party | Kanyakumari | Lost | 20,094 | 11.15% |
| 2016 | Bharatiya Janata Party | Nagercoil | Lost | 46,413 | 26.78% |
| 2021 | Bharatiya Janata Party | Nagercoil | Won | 88,804 | 48.21% |
| 2026 | Bharatiya Janata Party | Nagercoil | Lost | 52,355 | 26.67% |

=== Lok Sabha Elections ===
| Year | Election | Party | Constituency | Result | Votes gained | Vote % |
|---|---|---|---|---|---|---|
| 1989 | 9th Lok Sabha | Bharatiya Janata Party | Nagercoil | Lost | 39,164 | 7.12% |
