= A. Nanjil Murugesan =

Indian politician

A. Nanjil Murugesan was an Indian politician and ex member of the Tamil Nadu Legislative Assembly from the Nagercoil constituency from 2011 to 2016. He represents the Anna Dravida Munnetra Kazhagam party. He was expelled from AIADMK for anti-party activities on 27 July 2020. He died following a massive cardiac arrest.
