= Kanniyakumari Assembly constituency =

One of the 234 State Legislative Assembly Constituencies in Tamil Nadu

Coordinates: 8.084°N 77.546°E

Kanniyakumari
- Constituency No. 229 for the Tamil Nadu Legislative Assembly
- Kanniyakumari

Constituency details
- Country: India
- Region: South India
- State: Tamil Nadu
- District: Kanniyakumari
- Established: 1951
- Total electors: 288,867
- Reservation: None

Member of Legislative Assembly
- 17th Tamil Nadu Legislative Assembly
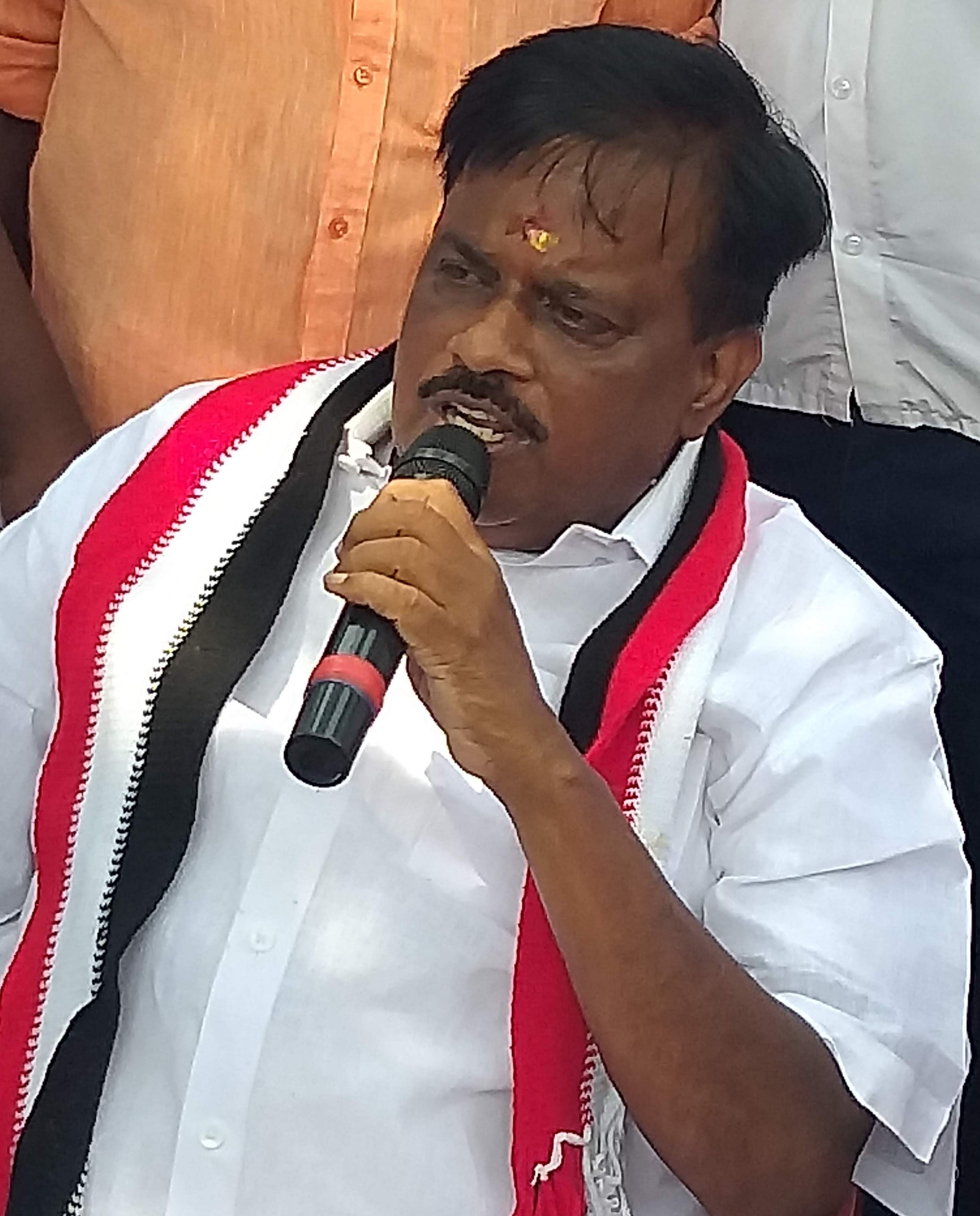
- Incumbent Thalavai Sundaram
- Party: AIADMK
- Alliance: NDA
- Elected year: 2026

Kanniyakumari is a Tamil Nadu assembly constituency located in Kanniyakumari Lok Sabha constituency in Kanniyakumari district in Tamil Nadu. The constituency is located in the southern corner of mainland India, comprising the popular tourist destination Kanniyakumari. In the 2011 election, it had 237,410 total number of voters, consisting of 120,372 males and 117,038 females. Kanniyakumari was one of 17 assembly constituencies to have VVPAT facility with EVMs in the 2016 Tamil Nadu Legislative Assembly election. It is one of the 234 State Legislative Assembly Constituencies in Tamil Nadu.

== Demographics ==
Gender demographics of Kanniyakumari constituency as of 01.05.2021, taken ahead of the state general elections in 2021.

Year	Female	Male	Transgender	Total
2021	1,44,982	1,47,347	104	2,92,433

== Members of Legislative Assembly ==
Year	Member	Political party
Travancore–Cochin
1952 (Note: Thovalai Agastheeswaram)	T. S. Ramasamy Pillai	Indian National Congress
1952	A. Samraj	Indian National Congress
1954	T. S. Ramasamy Pillai (Note: Thovalai)	Praja Socialist Party
1954	P. Thanulinga Nadar (Note: Agastheeswaram)	Travancore Tamil Nadu Congress
Madras State
1957	T. S. Ramaswamy Pillai	Independent
1962	B. Natarajan	Indian National Congress
1967	B. M. Pillai	Indian National Congress
Tamil Nadu
1971	K. Rajah Pillai	Dravida Munnetra Kazhagam
1977	C. Krishnan	All India Anna Dravida Munnetra Kazhagam
1980	S. Muthukrishnan	All India Anna Dravida Munnetra Kazhagam
1984	K. Perumal Pillai	All India Anna Dravida Munnetra Kazhagam
1989	K. Subramania Pillai	Dravida Munnetra Kazhagam
1991	M. Ammamuthu	All India Anna Dravida Munnetra Kazhagam
1996	N. Suresh Rajan	Dravida Munnetra Kazhagam
2001	Thalavai Sundaram	All India Anna Dravida Munnetra Kazhagam
2006	N. Suresh Rajan	Dravida Munnetra Kazhagam
2011	K. T. Pachaimal	All India Anna Dravida Munnetra Kazhagam
2016	S. Austin	Dravida Munnetra Kazhagam
2021	Thalavai N. Sundaram	All India Anna Dravida Munnetra Kazhagam
2026	Thalavai N. Sundaram	All India Anna Dravida Munnetra Kazhagam

== Election results ==
Vote share of winning candidates
2026	31.38%
2021	48.79%
2016	42.41%
2011	48.22%
2006	50.05%
2001	51.32%
1996	43.63%
1991	60.14%
1989	34.65%
1984	54.05%
1980	47.58%
1977	33.32%
1971	51.10%
1967	56.89%
1962	80.58%
1957	44.05%
1954 Thovalai	57.09%
1954 Agastheeswaram	52.34%
1951	18.46%

=== 2026 ===
2026 Tamil Nadu Legislative Assembly election: Kanniyakumari
Party	Candidate	Votes	%	±%
AIADMK	Thalavai Sundaram. N	75,045	31.38	▼17.41
DMK	Mahesh. R	74,831	31.29	▼10.30
TVK	Madhavan. S.R	72,977	30.52	New
NOTA	NOTA	825	0.34	
Independent	Rajan. S	454	0.19	New
TVK	Reagon Anto. J	301	0.13	New
Thamizhaka Padaippalar Makkal Katchi	Srikrishnakumar. K	206	0.09	New
Naam Indiar Party	Sivalingam. C	194	0.08	New
CPI(ML) Red Star	Manavai Kannan. M	140	0.06	New
Independent	David Sahaya Bascar	117	0.05	New
Independent	Ramakrishnan. C	107	0.04	New
Independent	Sudhagar. R	93	0.04	New
Independent	Thanuneelan. S	90	0.04	New
Independent	Kanagaraj. T	81	0.03	New
Margin of victory		214	0.09	▼7.11
Turnout		2,39,150	82.59	▼28.34
Registered electors		2,89,561		▲86,618
AIADMK hold		Swing	▼17.41	

=== 2021 ===
2021 Tamil Nadu Legislative Assembly election: Kanniyakumari
Party	Candidate	Votes	%	±%
AIADMK	Thalavai Sundaram	109,828	48.79	9.20
DMK	S. Austin	93,618	41.59	−0.82
MNM	P. T. Selvakumar	3,109	1.38	
AMMK	P. Senthil Murugan	1,599	0.71	
Margin of victory		16,210	7.20	4.38
Turnout		225,121	110.93	35.86
Rejected ballots		452	0.20	
Registered electors		202,943		
AIADMK gain from DMK		Swing	6.38	

=== 2016 ===
2016 Tamil Nadu Legislative Assembly election: Kanniyakumari
Party	Candidate	Votes	%	±%
DMK	S. Austin	89,023	42.41	4.06
AIADMK	Thalavai Sundaram	83,111	39.59	−8.63
BJP	M. Meena Dev	24,638	11.74	0.59
DMDK	D. Aathilinga Perumal	6,914	3.29	
NOTA	None Of The Above	1,570	0.75	
PMK	S. Hilman Bruce Edwin	712	0.34	
Margin of victory		5,912	2.82	−7.06
Turnout		209,924	75.07	−0.69
Registered electors		279,651		
DMK gain from AIADMK		Swing	-5.82	

=== 2011 ===
2011 Tamil Nadu Legislative Assembly election: Kanniyakumari
Party	Candidate	Votes	%	±%
AIADMK	K. T. Pachaimal	86,903	48.22	6.64
DMK	N. Suresh Rajan	69,099	38.34	−11.71
BJP	M. R. Gandhi	20,094	11.15	8.43
ABHM	Vetti Velayutha	734	0.41	
Independent	Perumal. P Manik Prabhu	538	0.30	
Independent	K. S. Ramanathan	532	0.30	
Independent	S. Vasu	461	0.26	
Independent	K. Rajesh	459	0.25	
BSP	P. Suresh Ananth	418	0.23	
Independent	S. Vadivelpillai	198	0.11	
Independent	Y. Patchaimal	167	0.09	
Margin of victory		17,804	9.88	1.41
Turnout		237,865	75.76	4.05
Registered electors		180,206		
AIADMK gain from DMK		Swing	-1.83	

=== 2006 ===
2006 Tamil Nadu Legislative Assembly election: Kanniyakumari
Party	Candidate	Votes	%	±%
DMK	N. Suresh Rajan	63,181	50.05	7.53
AIADMK	Thalavai Sundaram	52,494	41.59	−9.73
DMDK	A. Alex Shantha Sekar	5,093	4.03	
BJP	N. Thanu Krishnan	3,436	2.72	
Independent	K. Rajan	769	0.61	
Independent	S. Subramania Pillai	333	0.26	
AIFB	T. Uthaman	317	0.25	
Independent	K. Gopi	310	0.25	
Independent	S. Kumaraswamy	117	0.09	
ABHM	P. Vetri Velayutha Perumal	109	0.09	
Independent	S. Kumariswamy Nadar	66	0.05	
Margin of victory		10,687	8.47	−0.33
Turnout		126,225	71.71	14.08
Registered electors		176,033		
DMK gain from AIADMK		Swing	-1.26	

=== 2001 ===
2001 Tamil Nadu Legislative Assembly election: Kanniyakumari
Party	Candidate	Votes	%	±%
AIADMK	Thalavai Sundaram	55,650	51.32	30.00
DMK	N. Suresh Rajan	46,114	42.52	−1.11
MDMK	E. Lakshmanan	4,991	4.60	−2.48
Independent	R. Jayakumar	723	0.67	
Independent	S. Rajasekaran	331	0.31	
Independent	L. Ayyasamypandian	310	0.29	
Independent	U. Nagurmeran Peer Muhamad	138	0.13	
Independent	Kumariswami	104	0.10	
Independent	V. Thanulingam	82	0.08	
Margin of victory		9,536	8.79	−13.52
Turnout		108,443	57.62	−4.74
Registered electors		188,205		
AIADMK gain from DMK		Swing	7.68	

=== 1996 ===
1996 Tamil Nadu Legislative Assembly election: Kanniyakumari
Party	Candidate	Votes	%	±%
DMK	N. Suresh Rajan	42,755	43.63	21.62
AIADMK	S. Thanu Pillai	20,892	21.32	−38.82
BJP	V. S. Rajan	13,197	13.47	−1.53
Independent	K. Baul Sundar	12,421	12.68	
MDMK	S. Ramiah Pillai	6,942	7.08	
Independent	S. P. Nadaraja	380	0.39	
Independent	R. Sivathanu Pillai	336	0.34	
JP	R. Rajkumar	248	0.25	
PMK	A. Abraham Royan	234	0.24	
Independent	A. Chellappan	144	0.15	
Independent	Kavikone Kannithasan @ Subramoniam	129	0.13	
Margin of victory		21,863	22.31	−15.82
Turnout		97,985	62.36	3.57
Registered electors		165,258		
DMK gain from AIADMK		Swing	-16.51	

=== 1991 ===
1991 Tamil Nadu Legislative Assembly election: Kanniyakumari
Party	Candidate	Votes	%	±%
AIADMK	M. Ammamuthu Pillai	54,194	60.14	36.90
DMK	C. Krishnan	19,835	22.01	−12.63
BJP	M. E. Appan	13,518	15.00	13.00
Independent	Y. David	2,023	2.25	
Independent	U. Nagoor Meeran Peer Mohamead	105	0.12	
Independent	E. Andrews	97	0.11	
THMM	K. Murugan	70	0.08	
Pondichery Mannila Makkal Munnani	J. Z. Markesasan	67	0.07	
Independent	Dhanaraj Durai	57	0.06	
Independent	A. Maria Alex	46	0.05	
Independent	S. Thanka Raj	36	0.04	
Margin of victory		34,359	38.13	35.70
Turnout		90,109	58.79	−10.80
Registered electors		158,543		
AIADMK gain from DMK		Swing	25.50	

=== 1989 ===
1989 Tamil Nadu Legislative Assembly election: Kanniyakumari
Party	Candidate	Votes	%	±%
DMK	K. Subramania Pillai	33,376	34.65	−10.28
INC	V. Aurmugham Pillai	31,037	32.22	
AIADMK	K. Chockalingam Pillai	22,391	23.24	−30.81
AIADMK	K. Perumal Pillai	5,928	6.15	−47.90
BJP	S. Monickavasagam Pillai	1,930	2.00	
Independent	Kodikkal Chellappa	711	0.74	
Independent	C. Chellavadivoo	581	0.60	
Independent	A. Vethamanickam	177	0.18	
Independent	I. Hari Ramakrishnan	92	0.10	
Independent	V. Thangasamy	67	0.07	
Independent	D. Thangaselvin	42	0.04	
Margin of victory		2,339	2.43	−6.70
Turnout		96,332	69.59	−2.46
Registered electors		140,558		
DMK gain from AIADMK		Swing	-19.40	

=== 1984 ===
1984 Tamil Nadu Legislative Assembly election: Kanniyakumari
Party	Candidate	Votes	%	±%
AIADMK	K. Perumal Pillai	45,353	54.05	6.47
DMK	M. Sankaraligom	37,696	44.92	
Independent	K. Ponswamy	349	0.42	
Independent	M. Sundaram	316	0.38	
Independent	S. Viswanathan	197	0.23	
Margin of victory		7,657	9.13	−0.36
Turnout		83,911	72.05	5.24
Registered electors		121,584		
AIADMK hold		Swing	6.47	

=== 1980 ===
1980 Tamil Nadu Legislative Assembly election: Kanniyakumari
Party	Candidate	Votes	%	±%
AIADMK	S. Muthukrishnan	35,613	47.58	14.26
INC	A. Mathevan Pillai	28,515	38.10	27.33
JP	P. Anandan	6,986	9.33	
Independent	P. Aruldhas	3,737	4.99	
Margin of victory		7,098	9.48	−0.86
Turnout		74,851	66.81	−0.13
Registered electors		112,972		
AIADMK hold		Swing	14.26	

=== 1977 ===
1977 Tamil Nadu Legislative Assembly election: Kanniyakumari
Party	Candidate	Votes	%	±%
AIADMK	C. Krishnan	23,222	33.32	
JP	T. C. Subramania Pillay	16,010	22.97	
DMK	M. Subramanian	14,854	21.31	−29.79
INC	K. Muthuaruppa Pillai	7,507	10.77	−33.84
Independent	S. Shanmugam	6,712	9.63	
Independent	T. Chinnakam Nadar	930	1.33	
Independent	R. Subramania Pillai	468	0.67	
Margin of victory		7,212	10.35	3.86
Turnout		69,703	66.94	−11.53
Registered electors		104,698		
AIADMK gain from DMK		Swing	-17.79	

=== 1971 ===
1971 Tamil Nadu Legislative Assembly election: Kanniyakumari
Party	Candidate	Votes	%	±%
DMK	K. Rajah Pillai	35,884	51.10	
INC	B. Mahadevan Pillai	31,326	44.61	−12.28
Independent	A. Anderson	2,678	3.81	
Independent	N. Nataraja Pillai	332	0.47	
Margin of victory		4,558	6.49	−8.09
Turnout		70,220	78.47	−1.11
Registered electors		93,383		
DMK gain from INC		Swing	-5.79	

=== 1967 ===
1967 Madras Legislative Assembly election: Kanniyakumari
Party	Candidate	Votes	%	±%
INC	B. M. Pillai	37,998	56.89	−23.69
SWA	S. M. Pillai	28,260	42.31	
Independent	P. Poomoney	537	0.80	
Margin of victory		9,738	14.58	−48.89
Turnout		66,795	79.58	6.55
Registered electors		85,614		
INC hold		Swing	-23.69	

=== 1962 ===
1962 Madras Legislative Assembly election: Kanniyakumari
Party	Candidate	Votes	%	±%
INC	B. Natarajan	46,263	80.58	38.76
PSP	S. Rassiah	9,825	17.11	
Independent	P. Poomoney	1,324	2.31	
Margin of victory		36,438	63.47	61.24
Turnout		57,412	73.03	−4.97
Registered electors		80,199		
INC gain from Independent		Swing	36.53	

=== 1957 ===
1957 Madras Legislative Assembly election: Kanniyakumari
Party	Candidate	Votes	%	±%
Independent	T. S. Ramasamy Pillai	24,557	44.05	
INC	B. Natarajan	23,316	41.82	
Independent	Vivekanandam	6,866	12.32	
Independent	Kumaraswamy	1,013	1.82	
Margin of victory		1,241	2.23	
Turnout		55,752	78.00	
Registered electors		71,481		
Independent win (new seat)				

=== 1954 Agastheeswaram ===
1954 Travancore-Cochin Legislative Assembly election: Agastheeswaram
Party	Candidate	Votes	%	±%
TTNC	P. Thanulinga Nadar	15,587	52.34	
INC	C. Balakrishnan	8,866	29.77	29.77
Independent	S. D. Pandia Nadar	5,328	17.89	
Margin of victory		6,721	22.57	
Turnout		29,781	66.67	
Registered electors		44,670		
TTNC win (new seat)				

=== 1954 Thovala ===
1954 Travancore-Cochin Legislative Assembly election: Thovala
Party	Candidate	Votes	%	±%
PSP	T. S. Ramasamy Pillai	16,702	57.09	
INC	K. Sivarama Pillai	8,117	27.75	27.75
TTNC	B. C. Muthiah	4,435	15.16	
Margin of victory		8,585	29.35	
Turnout		29,254	71.02	
Registered electors		41,189		
PSP win (new seat)				

=== 1952 ===
1952 Travancore-Cochin Legislative Assembly election: Thovala Agasteeswaram
Party	Candidate	Votes	%	±%
SP	T. S. Ramasamy Pillai	17,733	18.46	
SP	A. Samraj	13,104	13.64	
INC	Balakrishnan	12,132	12.63	12.63
TTNC	Manickom. Y.	10,491	10.92	
TTP	Gandhiraman Pillai. A. S.	9,976	10.39	
INC	Ramakrishnan. A. S.	9,619	10.01	10.01
TTNC	Sivarama Pillai. K.	9,498	9.89	
TTP	Ponniah. J.	8,524	8.87	
Independent	Thanumalaya Perunal Pillai	4,971	5.18	
Margin of victory		4,629	4.82	4.82
Turnout		96,048	124.85	
Registered electors		76,930		
SP win (new seat)				
