= K. Subramania Pillai =

Indian politician

K. Subramania Pillai was an Indian politician and former Member of the Legislative Assembly. He was elected to the Tamil Nadu Legislative Assembly as a Dravida Munnetra Kazhagam candidate from Kanyakumari constituency in Kanyakumari district in 1989 election.
