= B. Natarajan =

Indian politician

B. Natarajan was an Indian politician and former Member of the Legislative Assembly. He was elected to the Tamil Nadu legislative assembly as an Indian National Congress candidate from Kanyakumari constituency in Kanyakumari district in 1962 election.
