= D. Anantaraman =

Indian politician

D. Anantaraman was an Indian politician and former Member of the Legislative Assembly. He was elected to the Travancore-Cochin assembly as an Independent candidate from Nagercoil constituency in Kanyakumari district in the 1954 interim election. This was the second election held in this constituency and it happened before Kanyakumari district merged with Tamil Nadu.
