= S. Retnaraj =

Indian politician

S. Retnaraj was an Indian politician and former Member of the Legislative Assembly. He was elected to the Tamil Nadu legislative assembly as a Dravida Munnetra Kazhagam candidate from Colachel constituency in 1980 election and Nagercoil constituency in the 1984 election.

He was one of the founding member of Marumalarchi Dravida Munnetra Kazhagam.
