= Tamil Thai Valthu (Puducherry) =

State song of Puducherry, India

English: Prayer to Mother Tamil
- தமிழ்த்தாய் வாழ்த்து
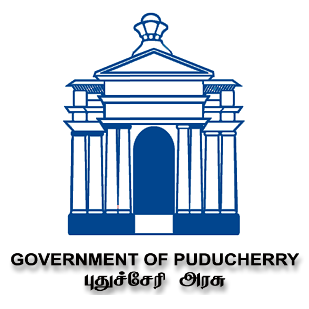
- Emblem of Puducherry
- State song of Puducherry
- Lyrics: Bharathidasan
- Music: L. Krishnan
- Adopted: 2007

Tamil Thai Valthu (Tamil: தமிழ்த்தாய் வாழ்த்து; "Prayer to Mother Tamil"), also known by the song's incipit, is the state song of the Indian union territory of Puducherry. It was written by famous poet Bharathidasan.

The song was at first sung in various tunes. In 1991, music director L. Krishnan set the current music and tune that the song is now sung to. Generally, official functions of the Government of Puducherry start with this song and end with "Jana Gana Mana".

== Lyrics ==
Tamil original

வாழ்வினில் செம்மையைச் செய்பவள் நீயே
மாண்புகள் நீயே என் தமிழ்த் தாயே
வீழ்வாரை வீழாது காப்பவள் நீயே!
வீரனின் வீரமும், வெற்றியும் நீயே!
தாழ்ந்திடு நிலையினில் உனைவிடுப் பேனோ
தமிழன் எந்நாளும் தலைகுனி வேனோ
சூழ்ந்தின்பம் நல்கிடும் பைந்தமிழ் அன்னாய்
தோன்றுடல் நின்உயிர் நான்மறப் பேனோ?
செந்தமிழே உயிரே நறுந் தேனே
செயலினை மூச்சினை உனக்களித் தேனே
நைந்தா யெனில்நைந்து போகுமென் வாழ்வு
நன்னிலை உனக்கெனில் எனக்குந் தானே!
முந்திய நாளினில் அறிவும் இலாது
மொய்த்தநன் மனிதராம் புதுப்புனல் மீது
செந்தாமரைக் காடு பூத்தது போலே
செழித்தஎன் தமிழே ஒளியே வாழி!
செழித்தஎன் தமிழே ஒளியே வாழி!
செழித்தஎன் தமிழே ஒளியே வாழி!

Romanisation

Vāḻviṉil cem'maiyai ceypavaḷ nīyē
māṇpukaḷ nīyē eṉ tamiḻ tāyē
vīḻvārai vīḻātu kāppavaḷ nīyē!
Vīraṉiṉ vīramum, veṟṟiyum nīyē!
Tāḻttiṭu nilaiyiṉil uṉaiviṭup pēṉō
tamiḻaṉ ennāḷum talaikuṉi vēṉō
cūḻntiṉpam nalkiṭum paintamiḻ aṉṉāy
tōṉṟuṭal niṉuyir nāṉmaṟap pēṉō?
Centamiḻē uyirē naṟun tēṉē
ceyaliṉai mūcciṉai uṉakkaḷit tēṉē
naintā yeṉilnaintu pōkumeṉ vāḻvu
naṉṉilai uṉakkeṉil eṉakkun tāṉē!
Muntiya nāḷiṉil aṟivum ilātu
moyttanaṉ maṉitarām putuppuṉal mītu
centāmaraik kāṭu pūttatu pōlē
ceḻitta'eṉ tamiḻē oḷiyē vāḻi!
Ceḻitta'eṉ tamiḻē oḷiyē vāḻi!
Ceḻitta'eṉ tamiḻē oḷiyē vāḻi!

== See also ==
- Tamil Thai
- Tamil Thai Valthu (Tamil Nadu)
- List of Indian state songs
