= Thirumukom =

Thirumukom, meaning respected or sacred face, was a form of address used by common people while referring to their superiors in Kerala state, South India. Medieval ruling chiefs called Pillais were to be addressed as Thirumukhom by the commoners. The term was also used in the ritual of Thirumukom Pidikukka, which was the main part of the ceremony of bestowing the title of Pillai on the Nairs of Travancore. Similar forms of address were Thampuran, Thirupad or Thiruvadi.

== See also ==
- Pillai
- Rajah
- Nair
- Travancore
- Kerala
