= Thalavai N. Sundaram =

Indian politician

Thalavai Sundaram N
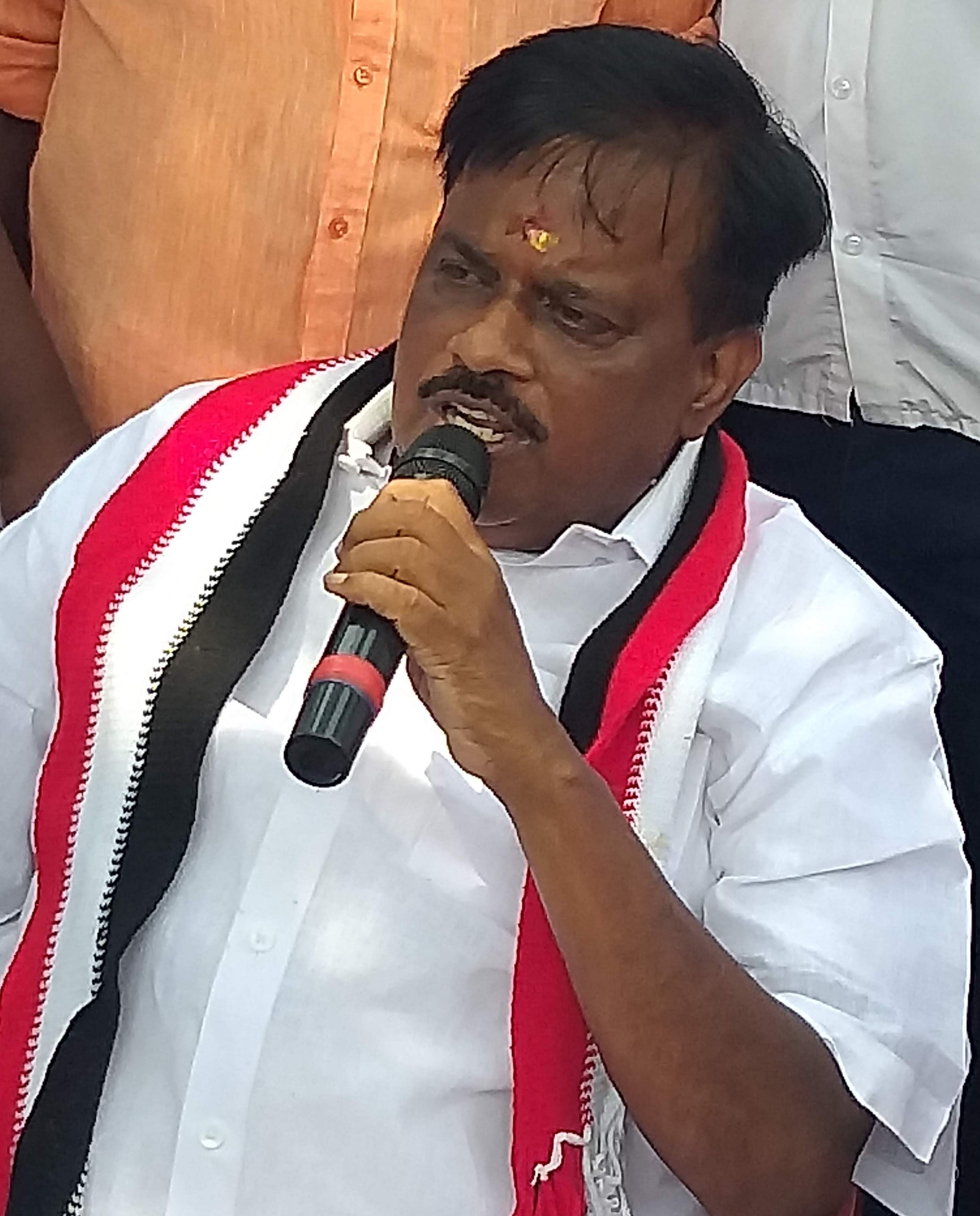

Member of the Tamil Nadu Legislative Assembly
- Incumbent
- Assumed office 12 May 2021
- Preceded by: S. Austin
- Constituency: Kanyakumari
- In office 2001–2006
- Preceded by: N. Suresh Rajan
- Succeeded by: N. Suresh Rajan
- Constituency: Kanyakumari

Member of Parliament, Rajya Sabha
- In office 3 April 1996 – 18 May 2001

Personal details
- Party: All India Anna Dravida Munnetra Kazhagam
- Occupation: Politician

Thalavai Sundaram N is an Indian politician. He is a member of the All India Anna Dravida Munnetra Kazhagam party. He was elected as a member of Tamil Nadu Legislative Assembly from Kanyakumari Constituency in May 2021 and in 2001 election. He served as Anna Dravida Munnetra Kazhagam Rajya Sabha member from 3 April 1996 to 18 May 2001.

== Electoral performance ==
2021 Tamil Nadu Legislative Assembly election: Kanniyakumari
Party	Candidate	Votes	%	±%
AIADMK	Thalavai Sundaram	109,828	48.79	9.20
DMK	S. Austin	93,618	41.59	−0.82
NTK	R. Sasikala	14,197	6.31	5.48
MNM	P. T. Selvakumar	3,109	1.38	
AMMK	P. Senthil Murugan	1,599	0.71	
Margin of victory		16,210	7.20	4.38
Turnout		225,121	110.93	35.86
Rejected ballots		452	0.20	
Registered electors		202,943		
AIADMK gain from DMK		Swing	6.38	

2016 Tamil Nadu Legislative Assembly election: Kanniyakumari
Party	Candidate	Votes	%	±%
DMK	S. Austin	89,023	42.41	4.06
AIADMK	Thalavai Sundaram	83,111	39.59	−8.63
BJP	M. Meena Dev	24,638	11.74	0.59
DMDK	D. Aathilinga Perumal	6,914	3.29	
NTK	V. Balasubramaniam	1,732	0.83	
NOTA	None Of The Above	1,570	0.75	
PMK	S. Hilman Bruce Edwin	712	0.34	
Margin of victory		5,912	2.82	−7.06
Turnout		209,924	75.07	−0.69
Registered electors		279,651		
DMK gain from AIADMK		Swing	-5.82	

2006 Tamil Nadu Legislative Assembly election: Kanniyakumari
Party	Candidate	Votes	%	±%
DMK	N. Suresh Rajan	63,181	50.05	7.53
AIADMK	Thalavai Sundaram	52,494	41.59	−9.73
DMDK	A. Alex Shantha Sekar	5,093	4.03	
BJP	N. Thanu Krishnan	3,436	2.72	
Independent	K. Rajan	769	0.61	
Independent	S. Subramania Pillai	333	0.26	
AIFB	T. Uthaman	317	0.25	
Independent	K. Gopi	310	0.25	
Independent	S. Kumaraswamy	117	0.09	
ABHM	P. Vetri Velayutha Perumal	109	0.09	
Independent	S. Kumariswamy Nadar	66	0.05	
Margin of victory		10,687	8.47	−0.33
Turnout		126,225	71.71	14.08
Registered electors		176,033		
DMK gain from AIADMK		Swing	-1.26	

2001 Tamil Nadu Legislative Assembly election: Kanniyakumari
Party	Candidate	Votes	%	±%
AIADMK	Thalavai Sundaram	55,650	51.32	30.00
DMK	N. Suresh Rajan	46,114	42.52	−1.11
MDMK	E. Lakshmanan	4,991	4.60	−2.48
Independent	R. Jayakumar	723	0.67	
Independent	S. Rajasekaran	331	0.31	
Independent	L. Ayyasamypandian	310	0.29	
Independent	U. Nagurmeran Peer Muhamad	138	0.13	
Independent	Kumariswami	104	0.10	
Independent	V. Thanulingam	82	0.08	
Margin of victory		9,536	8.79	−13.52
Turnout		108,443	57.62	−4.74
Registered electors		188,205		
AIADMK gain from DMK		Swing	7.68	
