= C. Sankar =

Indian politician

C. Sankar was an Indian politician and former Member of the Legislative Assembly. He was elected to the Travancore-Cochin assembly as an Indian National Congress candidate from Nagercoil constituency in Kanyakumari district in 1952 election. This was the first election from this constituency and it happened before Kanyakumari district merged with Tamil Nadu.
