= B. M. Pillai =

Indian politician

B. Mahadevan. Pillai was an Indian politician. He was the president of the Tamil Nadu Pradesh Congress Committee after the demise of Kamaraj Nadar and also a member of the All India Congress Committee. He was elected to the Tamil Nadu Legislative Assembly as an Indian National Congress candidate from Kanyakumari constituency in Kanyakumari district in 1967 election.

== Personal life ==
Born in Nagercoil, Mr. Pillai has two brothers, namely CA Thanupillai and Dr. Subramonian. Both prominent personalities in their corresponding fields.
