= M. Moses =

Indian politician

M. Moses is an Indian politician. He was elected to the Tamil Nadu legislative assembly from Nagercoil constituency as a Swatantra Party (SP) candidate in 1971, as an Indian National Congress (INC) candidate in 1989 and 1991, and as a candidate of the Tamil Maanila Congress (TMC) in 1996.
