= M. Ammamuthu Pillai =

Indian politician

M. Ammamuthu was an Indian politician and former Member of the Legislative Assembly. He was elected to the Tamil Nadu legislative assembly as an Anna Dravida Munnetra Kazhagam candidate from Kanyakumari constituency in Kanyakumari district in 1991 election.
