= C. Krishnan (Kanyakumari MLA) =

Indian politician

C. Krishnan was an Indian politician and former Member of the Legislative Assembly. He was elected to the Tamil Nadu legislative assembly as an Anna Dravida Munnetra Kazhagam candidate from Kanyakumari constituency in Kanyakumari district in 1977 election.
