= A. Chidambaranatha Nadar =

Indian politician

A. Chithambaranathan Nadar was an Indian politician and five times Member of the Legislative Assembly. He was elected twice to Travancore-Cochin assembly and three times to Madras State assembly. He was a cabinet minister for Travancore-Cochin during 1952–53.

He was elected to Travancore-Cochin assembly from Eraniel constituency as a Tamil Nadu Congress candidate in 1952 election. Eraniel was a two-member constituency and the other winner was A. K. Chelliah from the same party. In the A. J. John, Anaparambil cabinet, he served as minister of Land revenue and Forests.

He was again elected to Travancore-Cochin assembly from Neendakara constituency as a Tamil Nadu Congress candidate in 1952 election. He was elected to Madras State assembly from Nagercoil constituency in 1957 and 1962 elections as an Indian National Congress candidate. He was elected from Colachel constituency in 1967 election.
