= Pillai of Pallichal =

Title of the order of nobility in Travancore

Pillai of Pallichal is a Nair title of the order of nobility in Travancore. “Pillai” or "Pilla" (Malayalam: പിള്ള) signifies a noble Nair landlord, while “Pallichal” refers to a place near the Padmanabha Swamy Temple. The holders of the title held the lands of the Padmanabhaswamy Temple. There were hundreds of Nair landlords in early Travancore, and they were one among them, and related to Ettuveettil Pillaimar. More than five families held this title during different periods, and the eldest members among these families represented the title. The most notorious holder of the title, whose given name is disputed, was executed by King Marthanda Varma in the 1750s and relations banished.

Their absolute powers declined since the seizure of power and the creation of the state of Travancore under royal authority by King Marthanda Varma in the 1750s.

== Pallichal Pillai ==
Pallichal Pillai was one of the eight noble houses known as Ettuveetil Pillamar in the medieval history of south Kerala. The Ettuveetil Pillamar were the part of the administrative system in Travancore (which consisted of territory of the present Thiruvananthapuram i.e. the capital of the state of Keralam and the district of Kanyakumari in Tamil Nadu) from early times. They were known as Desavazhis, who were directly subordinate to the supreme power which was Nāduvāzhi.

Pallichal Pillai and Kodumon Pillai were the most powerful domains among the eight in Travancore. In the earlier 17th century the Karanavar of the family of Pallichal Pillai moved to Vanchimuttam near Attingal. All the family members of Pallichal Pillai family remained in Pallichal. This was because the Pallichal Pillai had slightly more alliance with Kollam and Attingal Swaroopams, and the south and east part of Karamana River was under the jurisdiction of Travancore, and because Pallichal is in this area. So he moved to avoid allegation of sedition on him by the Travancore royal family.

There are other legends attributable to the 8 Pillais. One view is that the king had no regular army those days. When war was threatened, the King sent messages to the 8 Pillais, who were masters of the ancient martial art "Kalaripayaatu" and had several trained warriors under their command. They sent their forces to fight the war. However Marthanda Varma, the King was a very ambitious man and he felt that this system had to change if he was to have his way. Since the Pillais were very popular they could not be done away with easily. False stories were spread about them and their houses and families destroyed by surprise attacks with the help of alien forces called "Maravas" and using soldiers and firearms captured from the Dutch.

== See also ==
- Jenmi
- Kalarippayattu
- List of Nairs
- Mamankam
- Mannarghat Nair
- Martial Race
- Nair Dynasty
- Odanad
- Pulleri Illathu Madhusoodanan Thangal
- Samanta Kshatriya
- Zamindar
