= Kavimani Desigavinayagam Pillai =

Indian writer

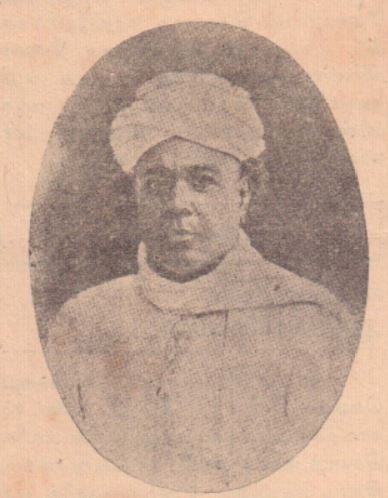
- Kavimani Desiga Vinayagam Pillai in 1940s
- Born: 27 July 1876; Theroor, Kanyakumari district, Tamilnadu
- Died: 26 September 1954 (aged 78)
- Known for: Poet
- Title: Kavimani
- Spouse: Umaiyammai
- Parent(s): Shivathaanu Pillai, Aathilakshmi

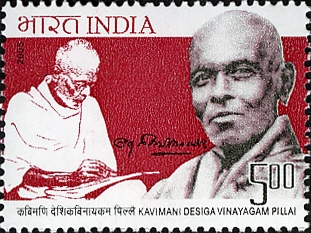
Kavimani Desigavinayagam Pillai on a 2005 stamp of India

Kavimani Desigavinayagam Pillai (27 July 1876 – 26 September 1954) was a renowned Tamil poet from the village of Theroor in the Kanyakumari district of Tamil Nadu, India. His works encompass a wide range of genres including devotional songs, literary and historical poetry, children's songs, nature poems, social themes, and nationalistic verses. He was particularly noted for his contributions to children's literature in Tamil.

== Early life ==
Desigavinayagam Pillai was born on 27 July 1876 in Theroor to Sivadanu Pillai and Aadhilakshmi. He was their third child after two daughters. His father named him "Desigavinayagam" after the deity he revered. Pillai lost his father at the age of nine. A scholar with an M.A. degree, he pursued teacher training and became a teacher at the same school where he had studied. He married Umayammai in 1901. Despite having no children, Pillai raised his nephew Sivadanu as his own son.

== Career as an educator ==
Pillai worked as a teacher for 36 years in various institutions, including the Kottar Elementary School in Nagercoil, the Nagercoil Teacher Training School, and the Women’s College in Thiruvananthapuram.

== Contributions to children's literature ==
Kavimani is credited with being the first Tamil poet to systematically write poetry for children. His 1938 collection, Malarum Maalaiyum, includes more than 25 children's songs and seven narrative poems. One of his most enduringly popular works is the children’s song Thottaththin Meiyudha Vellai Pasu (The White Cow Grazing in the Garden).

== Translator and adaptations ==
Pillai adapted Edwin Arnold's Light of Asia into Tamil under the title ஆசிய ஜோதி (Asiya Jyothi). He also translated the verses of Persian poet Omar Khayyam into Tamil, making them accessible to a Tamil audience.

== Researcher and scholar ==
Kavimani was an active researcher, contributing significantly to Tamil literature and historical studies. In 1922, he wrote Manonmaniam Marupirappu, a critical essay. He served as a reviewer for the Tamil Lexicon project initiated by the University of Madras. He also compiled manuscripts for works like Kambaramaayanam Divakaram and Navaneetha Paatiyal. His book Gandhaloor Saalai is considered an important historical study.

== Awards and honors ==
In 1940, Kavimani was conferred the title "Kavimani" by Tamil scholar Tamilavel Uma Maheswara Pillai at Pachaiyappa’s College in Chennai. In 1943, he was honored with a golden shawl by Annamalai Raja of Chettinad, though he refused monetary gifts. A memorial was established in Theroor in 1954, and in October 2005, the Government of India issued a commemorative postage stamp in his honor.

The public bus stand in Kanniyakumari is named Kavimani Desigavinayagam Pillai Bus Stand in his honour.

== Notable works ==
- Malarum Maalaiyum (1938)
- Asiya Jyothi (1941)
- Nanjilnadu Marumakkal Vazhi Maanmiyam (1942)
- Kadar Pirantha Kadhai (1947)
- Umar Khayyam Paadalgal (1945)
- Devi’s Keerthanangal
- Kuzhandhai Selvam
- Kavimaniyin Uraimanigal
- Gandhaloor Saalai
- Thottaththin Meiyudha Vellai Pasu
