= A. Rajan =

Indian politician

A. Rajan is an Indian politician and an Ex.Member of the Legislative Assembly. He was elected to the Tamil Nadu legislative assembly as a Dravida Munnetra Kazhagam candidate from Nagercoil constituency in Kanyakumari district in 2006 election.
