= Theroor =

Coordinates: 33°10′N 77°10′E

- panchayat town
- Interactive map of Theroor
- Country: India
- State: Tamil Nadu
- District: Kanniyakumari

Population (2012)
  - Total: 100,000

Languages
  - Official: Tamil
- Time zone: UTC+5:30 (IST)
- Postal code: 629704

Theroor is a panchayat town in Kanniyakumari district in the Indian state of Tamil Nadu.

== Demographics ==
As of 2011 India census, Theroor had a population of 100000. Males constitute 50% of the population and females 50%. Theroor has an average literacy rate of 86%, higher than the national average of 59.5%: male literacy is 89%, and female literacy is 83%. In Theroor, 8% of the population is under 6 years of age.
