= A. Samraj =

Indian politician

A. Samraj was an Indian politician and former Member of the Legislative Assembly. He was elected to the Travancore-Cochin assembly as an Indian National Congress candidate from Thovalai Agastheeswaram constituency in 1952 election. It was a two-member constituency and the other winner in the election was T. S. Ramasamy Pillai from the same party.
