= Valiyasala Mahadeva Temple =

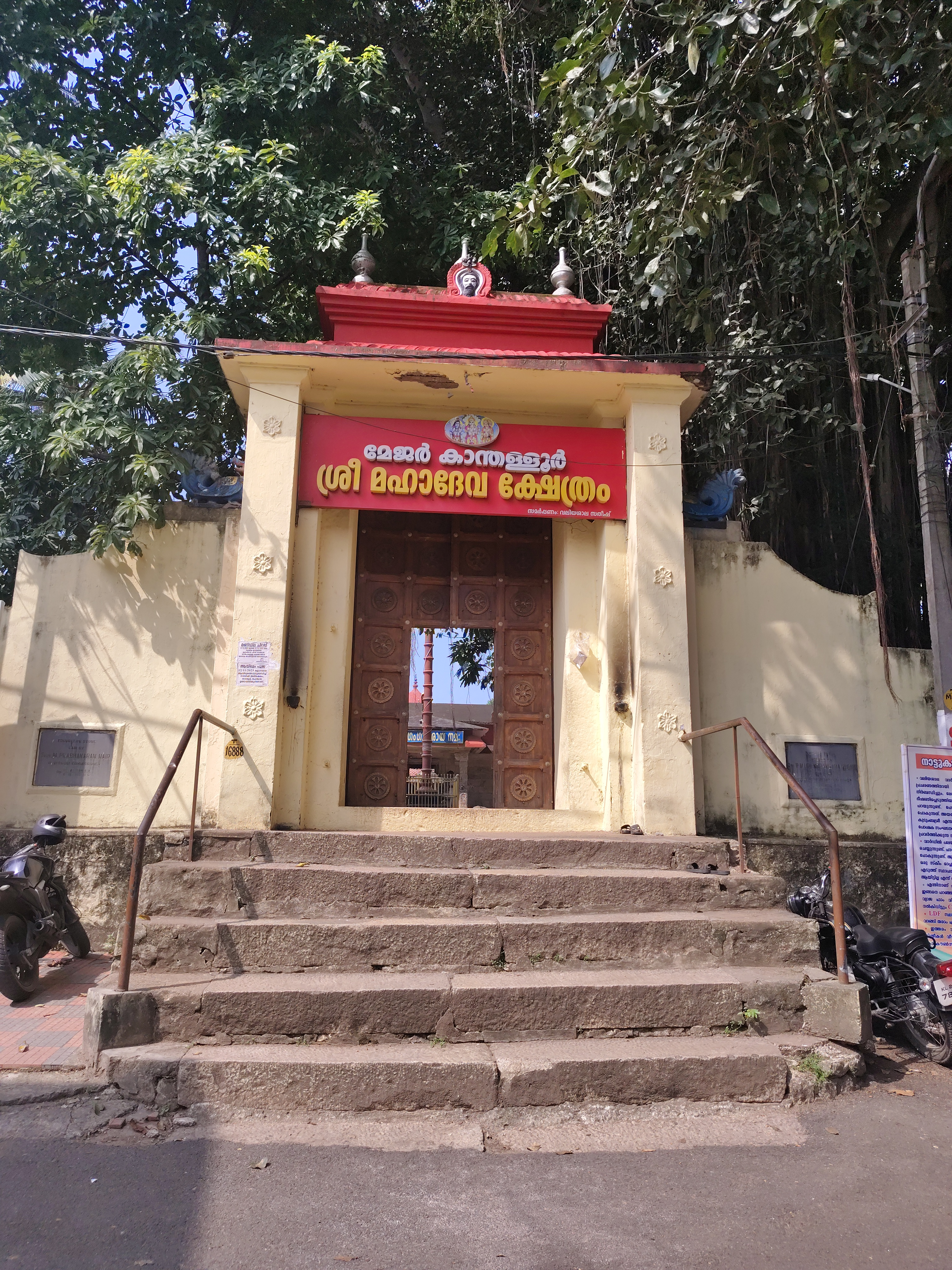

- Mahadeva Temple, Valiyasalai, Thiruvananthapuram, Kerala

Religion
- Affiliation: Hinduism
- District: Thiruvananthapuram
- Deity: Mahadevar

Location
- Location: Valiyasalai
- State: Kerala
- Country: India
- Interactive map of Valiyasala Mahadeva Temple
- Coordinates: 8°29′04″N 76°57′33″E

Architecture
- Type: Architecture of Kerala

Specifications
- Temple: One
- Elevation: 39.9 m (131 ft)

Kanthaloor Mahadeva Temple, Valiyasala is one of the ancient Trimurti temples in Thiruvananthapuram. Kanthaloor Sala, a famous university, was located here centuries back.

== Legend ==
The Chera, Chola and Pandya Kings fought against each other and died in the Kanthaloor region. Their Queens performed sati at their funeral pyres. Temples for Brahma, Sri Venkata Perumal and Sri Mahadeva rose at the sites of the pyres.

== Ettuveetil Pillamar ==
In the tussle between Sri Anizhom Thirunal Marthanda Varma and the Thampi siblings for the Throne of Venad, Ettuveetil Pillamar sided with Sri Padmanabhan Thampi and Raman Thampi. For destroying Marthanda Varma, Kudamon Pillai, one of the Pillamar, is said to have infused Smasaana Siva potency into the idol now known as Brahma. So Marthanda Varma reconsecrated Sri Venkita Perumal with a kadusarkara idol and conducted many rituals to compensate the negative charges of Smasaana Siva.

== The Royal Family of Travancore ==
It is a historical fact that even the successors of Anizhom Thirunal Marthanda Varma never visited Valiyasala Temple for centuries. In 2000, Maharaja Sri Uthradom Thirunal Marthanda Varma and his sister Maharani Karthika Thirunal Lakshmi Bayi visited the Temple.
