= Agamudayar =

Tamil community

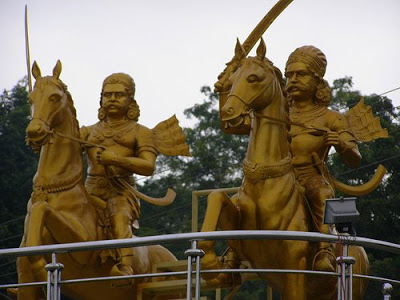
- The Marudhu Pandiyars (Periya Marudhu and Chinna Marudhu)
- Religions: Hinduism
- Languages: Tamil
- Region: Tamil Nadu
- Ethnicity: Tamils
- Population: 1981-1982: 5 per cent of the Backward Class population of Tamil Nadu

Agamudayar (otherwise Agamudaiyar, Akamudayar, Agamudayan) are a Tamil community found in the Indian state of Tamil Nadu. In Southern parts of Tamil Nadu, they are considered as one of the three castes which make up the Thevar or Mukkulathor community. According to the anthropologist Zoe E Headley, the three communities (Agamudayar, Kallar and Maravar) are the "numerically dominant rural backward castes of the southern districts of Tamil Nadu". Agamudayars are listed in the National Commission for Backward Classes lists for Tamil Nadu as "Agamudayar”. Mukkulathor is Denotified community and Backward Class community.

== Etymology ==
The term Agamudayar is a Tamil word of "Agam" which means Palace or Land and "Udayar"means Lord or Holder "Palace Chief " or "Land holder".

== Notable people ==
- T. R. Baalu
- T. R. B. Rajaa
- P. U. Chinnappa
- S. P. Jananathan
- Manivannan
- Maruthu Pandiyar
- Sangili Murugan
- S. S. Rajendran
- K. Samarasam (Politician)
- Soori (actor)
- Sandow M. M. A. Chinnappa Thevar
- V. Thiruselvam
- A. Veerappan
- Pachaiyappa Mudaliar
