= K. Perumal Pillai =

Indian politician

K. Perumal Pillai was an Indian politician and former Member of the Legislative Assembly. He was elected to the Tamil Nadu legislative assembly as an Anna Dravida Munnetra Kazhagam candidate from Kanyakumari constituency in Kanyakumari district in the 1984 Tamil Nadu assembly election.
