= T. S. Ramasamy Pillai =

Indian politician and freedom fighter

T.S.Ramaswami Pillai Tamil: டி எஸ் இராமஸ்வாமி பிள்ளை
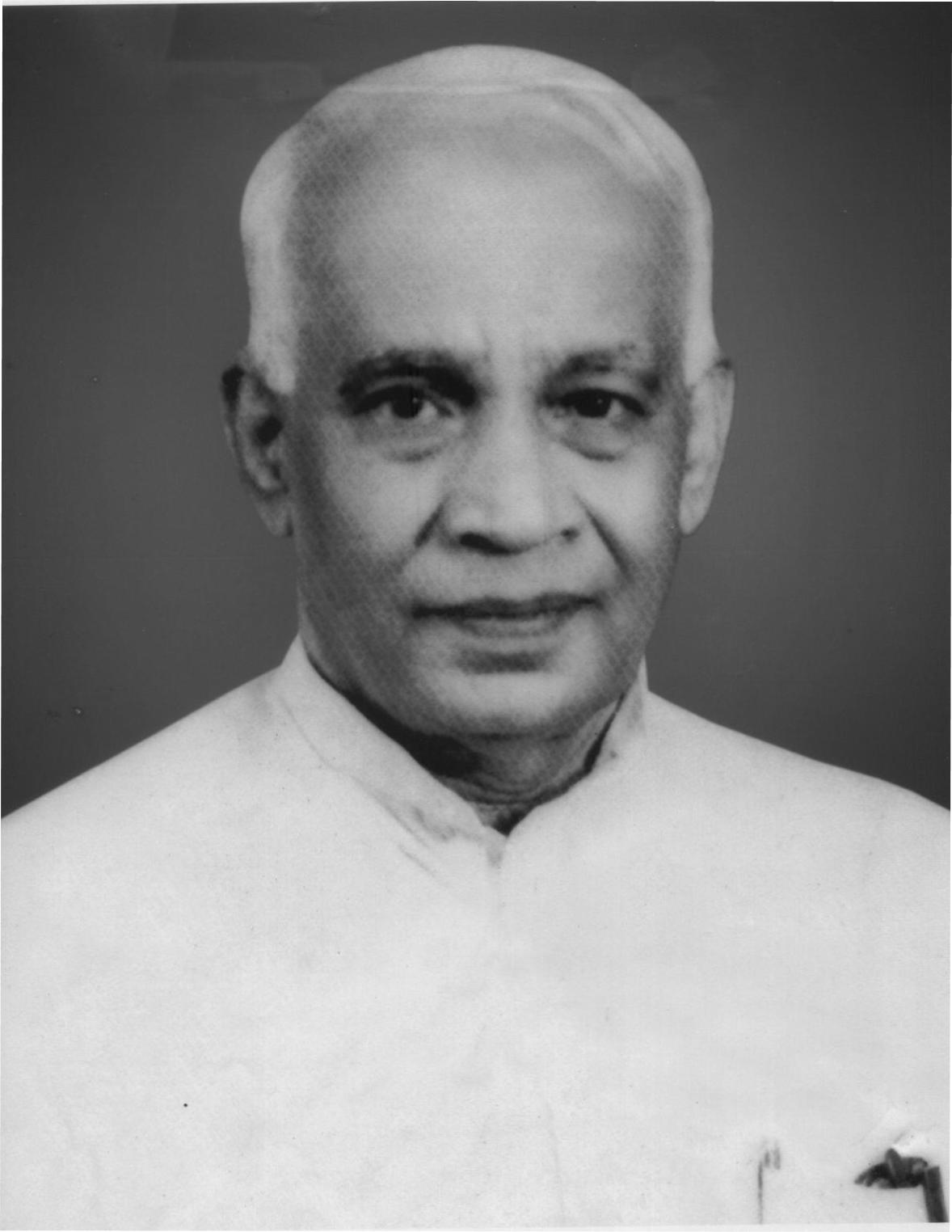
- T.S. Ramaswami, when he was Chairman-Secretary of S.T.Hindu College, Nagercoil

Personal details
- Born: 8 June 1918 Tamil Nadu
- Died: 15 June 2006 (aged 88)
- Spouse: Arundathi (1940–1966)
- Children: Sivasubramanian, Geetha, Raveendran, Harindranath, Prasad

T. S. Ramaswami Pillai (Tamil: டி எஸ் இராமஸ்வாமி பிள்ளை) (8 June 1918 – 15 June 2006) was an Indian politician, freedom fighter and former Member of the Legislative Assembly. He was elected to the Travancore-Cochin assembly from Thovalai Agastheeswaram constituency in 1952 election as an Indian National Congress candidate. Thovalai Agastheeswaram was a two-member constituency and the other winner was A. Samraj from the same party.

He won the 1954 election again as a Praja Socialist Party candidate from Thovalai constituency. He was elected to Tamil Nadu legislative assembly as an Independent candidate from Kanyakumari constituency in 1957 election.
