= Anton Sebastianpillai =

British author and consultant geriatrician (1945–2020)

- Born: c. 1944; Sri Lanka
- Died: Kingston Hospital
- Other name: Anton Sebastian
- Education: Faculty of Medicine, University of Peradeniya
- Occupations: Consultant, geriatrician, author, lexicographer, historian, bibliophile
- Employer: Kingston Hospital NHS Foundation Trust

Anton Sebastianpillai FRCP (23 January 1945 – 4 April 2020), was a British historian, author (writing as Anton Sebastian) and consultant geriatrician, of Sri Lankan Tamil origin.

== Biography ==
He had his primary and secondary education at St Sylvester's College, Kandy and trained at Peradeniya Medical School, in Sri Lanka, qualifying in 1967.

He gave talks to the Foreign Correspondents' Club, New Delhi, India, and gave the 'Millennium Oration' of the Sri Lanka Medical Association of North America.

He died on 4 April 2020, at Kingston Hospital, London, after contracting COVID-19 while working there. He had been admitted to the hospital's intensive care unit on 31 March and was aged 75.

He was a bibliophile, with a collection of rare books on Sri Lanka and on medical history.

== Works ==
As Anton Sebastian he wrote a number of reference works:

- A Dictionary of the History of Medicine. CRC Press. 1999. ISBN 978-1850700210.
- Dates in Medicine. CRC Press. 2000. ISBN 978-1850700951.
- A Dictionary of the History of Science. CRC Press. 2001. ISBN 978-1850704188.
- A Complete Illustrated History of Sri Lanka (2nd ed.). Sri Lanka: Vijitha Yapa Publications. 2014. ISBN 978-9556651492.

His Dictionary of the History of Medicine won a British Medical Association Medical Book Award.
