= N. Suresh Rajan =

Indian politician

Suresh Rajan (born 31 March 1963, Nagercoil) is an Indian politician from Tamil Nadu state.

Mr.Suresh Rajan has a M.A. degree. He started his political career in the Dravida Munnetra Kazhagam (DMK) youth wing. He has been elected to the Tamil Nadu Legislative Assembly for the years 1996–2001, 2006-2011 and from 2016. He was the former minister of Tourism twice in Tamil Nadu state.

== Elections contested ==
Elections	Constituency	Party	Result	Vote percentage	Opposition Candidate	Opposition Party	Opposition vote percentage
1996 Tamil Nadu state assembly election	Kanniyakumari	DMK	Won	43.63	S Thanu Pillai	AIADMK	21.32
2001 Tamil Nadu state assembly election	Kanniyakumari	DMK	Lost	42.52	N Thalavai Sundaram	AIADMK	51.32
2006 Tamil Nadu state assembly election	Kanniyakumari	DMK	Won	50.05	N Thalavai Sundaram	AIADMK	41.59
2011 Tamil Nadu state assembly election	Kanniyakumari	DMK	Lost	38.34	K T Patchaimal	AIADMK	48.22
2016 Tamil Nadu state assembly election	Nagercoil	DMK	Won	38.87	M. R. Gandhi	BJP	26.78
2021 Tamil Nadu state assembly election	Nagercoil	DMK	Lost	41.88	M. R. Gandhi	BJP	48.21
