= Tamil Thai Valthu (Tamil Nadu) =

State anthem of Tamil Nadu

English: Invocation to Tamil Mother
- Emblem of Tamil Nadu
- State song of Tamil Nadu
- Lyrics: Manonmaniam Sundaram Pillai
- Music: M. S. Viswanathan
- Adopted: 17 December 2021

"Tamil Thai Valthu" (Tamil: Tamiḻttāy Vāḻttu, lit. 'Invocation to Tamil Mother'; Tamil pronunciation: [t̪ʌmɪ˞ɻt̪ːɑːɪ̯ ʋɑ˞ːɻt̪ːɨ]) is the state song of the Indian state of Tamil Nadu. The original song was written by Manonmaniam Sundaram Pillai (1855-1897), as an invocation to Tamil Thai (Tamil Mother) in the prelude to the play Manonmaniam in 1891. A rendition of the song was later composed by M. S. Viswanathan, and sung by T. M. Soundarajan and P. Susheela.

On 11 March 1970, based on a request from the Karanthai Tamil Sangam, Chief Minister of Tamil Nadu M. Karunanidhi announced that verses of the song would be recited as Tamil Thai Valthu at the beginning of state government functions. The official order for the same was issued later on 23 November 1970. On 17 December 2021, the Government of Tamil Nadu formally declared it as the official state song, and mandated that every able person should stand when it is played or being sung.

== Lyrics ==
=== Official version ===
Tamil script

நீராருங் கடலுடுத்த நிலமடந்தைக் கெழிலொழுகும்
சீராரும் வதனமெனத் திகழ் பரதக் கண்டமிதில்
தெக்கணமும் அதிற்சிறந்த திராவிட நல் திருநாடும்
தக்கசிறு பிறைநுதலும் தரித்தநறுந் திலகமுமே
அத்திலக வாசனைபோல் அனைத்துலகும் இன்பமுற
எத்திசையும் புகழ் மணக்க இருந்த பெருந் தமிழணங்கே!
தமிழணங்கே!
உன்சீரிளமைத் திறம் வியந்து
செயல் மறந்து வாழ்த்துதுமே!
வாழ்த்துதுமே!
வாழ்த்துதுமே!

Romanisation

nīrāruṅ kaṭaluṭutta nilamaṭantaik keḻiloḻukum
sīrārum vataṉameṉat tikaḻ paratak kaṇṭamitil
tekkaṇamum atiṟciṟanta tirāviṭa nal tirunāṭum
takkasiṟu piṟainutalum tarittanaṟun tilakamumē
attilaka vāsaṉaipōl aṉaittulakum iṉpamuṟa
ettisaiyum pukaḻ maṇakka irunta perun tamiḻaṇaṅkē!
tamiḻaṇaṅkē!
uṉsīriḷamait tiṟam viyantu
seyal maṟantu vāḻttutumē!
vāḻttutumē!
vāḻttutumē!

English translation

Brimming sea drapes exuberant maiden of land!
With exalted Indian subcontinent as her beautified face!
South! In particular divine Dravidian country!
Like an aesthetic tilaka on its beauteous curved forehead!
Like the fragrance of that tilaka, for the entire world to be delirious!
Let your fervour spread in all directions!
Oh, Goddess Tamil!
Ever remain afresh Thee! Purity intact too!
Delighted! Praise thou beauteous Tamil, youthful forever! Awestruck! Praise unto thee!
Praise unto thee!
Praise unto thee!

=== Full version ===
Tamil script

நீராருங் கடலுடுத்த நிலமடந்தைக் கெழிலொழுகும்
சீராரும் வதனமெனத் திகழ் குமரிக் கண்டமிதில்
தெக்கணமும் அதிற்சிறந்த தமிழர்நல் திருநாடும்
தக்கசிறு பிறைநுதலும் தரித்தநறுந் திலகமுமே
அத்திலக வாசனைபோல் அனைத்துலகும் இன்பமுற
எத்திசையும் புகழ்மணக்க இருந்தபெருந் தமிழணங்கே!
தமிழணங்கே!
பல்லுயிரும் பலவுலகும் படைத்தளித்து துடைக்கினுமோர்
எல்லையறு பரம்பொருள்முன் இருந்தபடி இருப்பதுபோல்
கன்னடமுங் களிதெலுங்கும் கவின்மலையாளமும் துளுவும்
உன்னுதரத் தேயுதித்தே ஒன்றுபல வாகிடினும்
ஆரியம்போல் உலகவழக்கழிந் தொழிந்து சிதையாவுன்
சீரிளமைத் திறம்வியந்து செயல்மறந்து
வாழ்த்துதுமே!
வாழ்த்துதுமே!

Tamil Romanisation

nīrāruṅ kaṭaluṭutta nilamaṭantaik keḻiloḻukum
cīrārum vataṉameṉat tikaḻ bharatha kaṇṭamitil
tekkaṇamum atiṟciṟanta tamiḻarnal tirunāṭum
takkaciṟu piṟainutalum tarittanaṟun tilakamumē
attilaka vācaṉaipōl aṉaittulakum iṉpamuṟa
etticaiyum pukaḻmaṇakka iruntaperun tamiḻaṇaṅkē!
tamiḻaṇaṅkē!
palluyirum palavulagam padaithalitu tudaikinamor
ellayaru paramporulmun irunthapadi irupadhupol
kannadamum kalithelungum kavinmalayalamum tuluvum
unnutarat teyutite onrupala vākitinum
ariyampol ulagavaḻakhaḻint toḻindhusidhaiyāun
sērilamai tiram veyantu seyal marantu
vāḻttutumē!
vāḻttutumē!

English translation

Brimming Sea drapes exuberant maiden of land!
With exalted Indian subcontinent as her beautified face!
South! In particular divine Tamilian country!
Like an aesthetic tilaka on its beauteous curved forehead!
Like the fragrance of that tilaka, for the entire world to be delirious!
Let your fervour spread in all directions!
Many a life! Many a world! Creations of Thine! Decimations too !
Ever pervading Creator! Remain as ever! Ever as Thy have been!
Kannada, Joyous Telugu, Dainty Malayalam with Tulu!
Born of thy lips, the one that became many
Unlike Aryan (language) you don't go out of use,
Ever remain afresh Thee! Purity intact too!
Praise thou beauteous Tamil, youthful forever! Awestruck!
Praise unto thee!
Praise unto thee!

== See also ==
- List of Indian state songs
- Jana Gana Mana – National anthem of India
- Tamil Thai Valthu (Puducherry) – State song of Puducherry, India
- Vande Mataram – National song of India
