= Gerald Pillay =

South African theologian and ecclesiastical historian

Gerald John Pillay OBE DL FRSA (born 21 December 1953) is a South African theologian and ecclesiastical historian. He was vice chancellor and rector of Liverpool Hope University in England from 2003 until the end of 2022.

== Early life and education ==
Pillay was born on 21 December 1953 in Natal in South Africa. His ancestors had come from India to the then British colony of Natal, and he grew up in Durban under apartheid. He studied at the University of Durban-Westville (a university established for Indian South Africans), graduating with a Bachelor of Arts (BA) degree in 1975, a Bachelor of Divinity (BD) degree in 1978, and a Doctor of Theology (DTheol) degree in 1985. He also studied philosophical theology at Rhodes University, graduating with a Doctor of Philosophy (PhD) degree in 1984.

== Academic career ==
After lecturing at the University of Durban-Westville, he became professor of ecclesiastical history at the University of South Africa in 1988, a post he held for eight years. During this period, he was also guest professor at North Western University, Illinois; research fellow at Princeton University; guest professor at Rhodes University and visiting professor at the graduate school at the Associated Mennonite Biblical Seminary (AMBS), Indiana, US.

In 1997, he became foundation professor at the University of Otago, New Zealand. In 1998, he became executive head of the school of liberal arts within that university. He lived in New Zealand with his family for many years of his life before moving to the UK.

Pillay has served on editorial boards of two international journals (Studia Historiae Ecclesiasticae and Verbum et Ecclesia), has presented papers at numerous international conferences and has served on various public and educational bodies. He has been involved in recent research and lecturing in Cambridge, Oxford, Pretoria, California, Canada and Munich.

In September 2021, Pillay was announced to become the president of the international NGO Initiatives of Change International for three years.

== Liverpool Hope University ==
On 1 September 2003, Pillay was appointed rector of Liverpool Hope University College. He became the first vice chancellor and rector when Liverpool Hope was granted full university status in July 2005.

Under his leadership the university changed exponentially, benefitting from substantial investment to become a truly modern institution noted for the quality of its research-informed teaching. In 2009, research degree-awarding powers were granted, with a well-established research culture reflected in the results of the last three Research Excellence Frameworks. In 2017, Hope received Gold status in the Teaching Excellence Framework, and in 2019, Pillay led the celebrations to mark the 175th anniversary of the university’s first college being established.

He has also overseen the transformation of Hope’s campuses, which have received significant investment during his tenure. This includes the opening of the Eden Building in 2010, the state-of-the-art Health Sciences building and new sports facilities in 2016, and now the launch of the new IQ Building with its Simulation Laboratory.

Pillay also established the Creative Campus in Liverpool city centre, including the opening of the Capstone Building and the addition of a new arts centre, as well as the renovation and expansion of the Grade II-listed Cornerstone Building.

== Honours ==
In 2005, he was elected a Life Fellow of the Royal Society of the Arts (FRSA).

In 2013, he was presented with an honorary Doctorate of Letters from Hope College.

In 2009, Pillay was appointed a Deputy Lieutenant for Merseyside, assisting the Lord Lieutenant of Merseyside in carrying out her role as the Queen’s representative on Merseyside.

Pillay was appointed Officer of the Order of the British Empire (OBE) in the 2021 Birthday Honours for services to higher education.

== Selected works ==
- Pillay, G. J. (1994). Religion at the limits?: Pentecostalism among Indian South Africans (1st ed.). Pretoria: University of South Africa. ISBN 9780869818558.
- Hofmeyr, J. W.; Pillay, Gerald J., eds. (1994). A History of Christianity in South Africa: Volume 1. Pretoria: HAUM Tertiary. ISBN 9780798632287.
