= Manonmaniam Sundaram Pillai =

Indian writer and scholar (1855-1897)

Manonmaniyam P. Sundaram Pillai
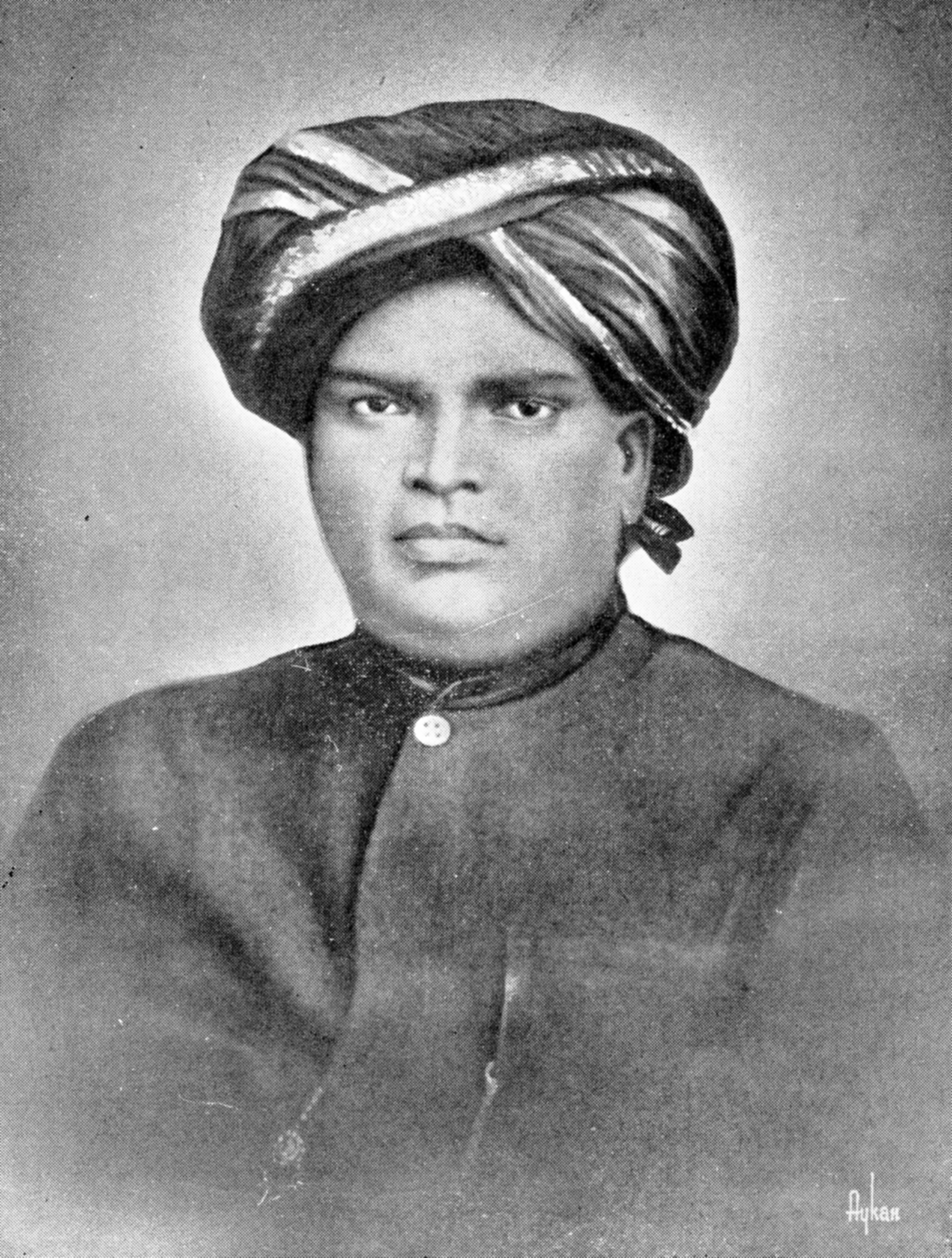
- Born: Manmoniyam Perumal Sundaram; 4 April 1855; Kuttanad, Travancore (present-day Alappuzha district, Kerala, India)
- Died: 26 April 1897 (aged 42)
- Occupations: Writer; Scholar

Manonmaniyam P. Sundaranar (4 April 1855 – 26 April 1897) was an Indian writer and scholar, noted for the famous Tamil drama Manonmaniyam. as well as the state song of Tamil Nadu Tamil Thai Valthu.

== Career ==
Sundaram showed his respect for Harvey, a Scottish Professor of Philosophy and English at The Maharaja's College, by dedicating his drama Manonmaniyam to him, and naming his farmhouse after him. Together they wrote the book, Some Early Sovereigns of Travancore.

The MDT Hindu College, Tirunelveli, of which he was the first Principal, describes his works as follows:

In 1885, he published Chathira Saugiragam, commonly known as Nootrogai Villakkam. He wrote and published his masterpiece Manonmaniam in 1891. In the same year, he became a member Fellow of Madras University (FMU). In 1897, Some Early Sovereigns of Travancore was published and he became a Member of Royal Asiatic Society (MRAS).

== Death ==
He died of diabetes on 26 April 1897, at age 42. His son P. S. Nataraja Pillai served as Minister of Finance for Travancore-Cochin state from 1954–56 and was also a member of Constituent Assembly of India. He was elected to state legislative assembly of Kerala and to the Indian Parliament as a Lok Sabha member. He was politically associated with the Indian National Congress and Praja Socialist Party of India.

== Legacy ==
Manonmaniam Sundaranar University was named after him.

The 1942 cinema adaptation of Manonmani is considered a classic film.

== Works ==
- Nūṟṟokai viḷakkam (நூற்றொகை விளக்கம்) (Tamil,1888)
- Maṉōṉmaṇīyam (மனோன்மணீயம்) (Drama, 1891)
- Some early sovereigns of Travancore (திருவிதாங்கூர் பண்டை மன்னர் கால ஆராய்ச்சி. P.S. Natarajan. 1894.
- Some Milestones in the History of Tamil Literature: Found in an Enquiry Into the Age of Tiru Gnana Sambandha. Addison & Company. 1895.
- Tamiḻttāy vāḻttu (தமிழ்த்தாய் வாழ்த்து)

== See also ==
- Tamil Thai
