= Bastiampillai Anthonipillai Thomas =

Sri Lankan Catholic religious priest (1886–1964)

Servant of God Bastiampillai Anthonipillai Thomas OMI
- Born: 7 March 1886; Padiyanthalvu, Jaffna, Sri Lanka
- Died: January 26, 1964 (aged 77)

Bastiampillai Anthonipillai Thomas (7 March 1886 – 26 January 1964) was a Catholic religious priest of the Congregation of Missionary Oblates of Mary Immaculate. He founded a religious congregation, the Rosarians.

== Life ==
Thomas was born on 7 March 1886 in Padiyanthalvu, Jaffna, Sri Lanka. He studied at St. Patrick's College, Jaffna and at University of Cambridge. Since childhood he was of weak health.

As a student at the Oblate-run St. Patrick's Seminary in Jaffna, Anthonipillai completed his studies in 1903, qualifying for the University of Cambridge. In 1907, he entered the Oblate Order and chose the religious name Thomas. Throughout his life, he suffered from frail health and was ordained a priest on January 5, 1912. Due to his emaciated physical condition, his superiors allowed Thomas to devote himself entirely to his studies. In addition to Thomism, he also immersed himself in Hindu literature, which enabled him to engage in dialogue with the local Hindus and inspired some to convert to Catholicism. In 1924, when missionary bishops were encouraged to establish contemplative communities, the Bishop of Jaffna, Alfred Guyomard OMI, entrusted Thomas with this task. With the help of indigenous monks, he founded the first contemplative religious order in Asia, the Rosarians. The institute was canonically established in 1934; in 1948, after several attempts, a branch for religious sisters was founded, the Rosarian Sisters.

Thomas founded the emerging monasteries according to the Western monastic tradition of the Rule of St. Benedict, which he enriched with Hindu and Buddhist elements in culture, chant, observance, and work practices. Since the Rule of St. Benedict postulates a classless society, Thomas's approach of abolishing the traditional caste system of Sri Lanka in his communities triggered several local conflicts.

== Beatification process ==
Shortly before his death on January 26, 1964, in Pandiyanthalvu, a city in northeastern Sri Lanka, Thomas received the Superior General of the Oblates, Leo Deschatelets, who returned to Rome with moving words. Thomas's body was exhumed on 8 March 2004, and reinterred with government permission at the Jaffna Arul Ashram, as his grave had been located in a high-security zone at the foot of the mountain during the Sri Lankan Civil War.

Pope Benedict XVI conferred upon Thomas the title of a Servant of God on 11 March 2006. The postulator of the beatification process is Thomas Klosterkamp OMI.
