= Colachal Assembly constituency =

State Legislative Assembly Constituency in Tamil Nadu, India

Coordinates: 8.18°N 77.25°E

Colachel
- Constituency No. 231 for the Tamil Nadu Legislative Assembly

Constituency details
- Country: India
- Region: South India
- State: Tamil Nadu
- District: Kanniyakumari
- Lok Sabha constituency: Kanniyakumari
- Established: 1951
- Total electors: 2,66,055
- Reservation: None

Member of Legislative Assembly
- 17th Tamil Nadu Legislative Assembly
- Incumbent Tharahai Cuthbert
- Party: INC
- Alliance: TVK+
- Elected year: 2026

Colachel is an assembly constituency located in Kanniyakumari Lok Sabha constituency in Kanyakumari district in Tamil Nadu. It is one of the 234 State Legislative Assembly Constituencies in Tamil Nadu, in India.

== Members of Legislative Assembly ==
Year	Name	Party
Travancore-Cochin Assembly
1952 (Note: Braniel seat)	A. K. Chellaiya	Travancore Tamil Nadu Congress
1954	T. T. Daniel	Tamil Nadu Congress
Madras State
1957	Lourdammal Simon	Indian National Congress
1962	A. Swamidhas	Independent politician
1967	A. Chidambaranatha Nadar	Indian National Congress
Tamil Nadu
1971	A. Pauliah	Indian National Congress
1977	R. Athiswami	Janata Party
1980	S. Retnaraj	Dravida Munnetra Kazhagam
1984	F. M. Rajarathnam	All India Anna Dravida Munnetra Kazhagam
1989	A. Pauliah	Indian National Congress
1991	A. Pauliah	Indian National Congress
1996	Era Bernard	Dravida Munnetra Kazhagam
2001	K. T. Pachaimal	All India Anna Dravida Munnetra Kazhagam
2006	S. Jeyapaul	Indian National Congress
2011	J. G. Prince	Indian National Congress
2016	J. G. Prince	Indian National Congress
2021	J. G. Prince	Indian National Congress
2026	Tharahai Cuthbert	Indian National Congress

== Election results ==
Vote share of winning candidates
2026	33.27%
2021	49.56%
2016	40.19%
2011	40.16%
2006	46.99%
2001	46.23%
1996	42.85%
1991	60.01%
1989	39.19%
1984	39.33%
1980	67.03%
1977	30.40%
1971	54.98%
1967	48.37%
1962	55.64%
1957	40.73%
1954	59.14%

=== 2026 ===
2026 Tamil Nadu Legislative Assembly election: Colachal
Party	Candidate	Votes	%	±%
INC	Tharahai Cuthbert	66,207	33.27	▼16.29
TVK	Prem Alex Lawrence	63,374	31.84	New
BJP	Sivakumar. T	54,384	27.33	▼8.66
NOTA	NOTA	581	0.29	▼0.19
Margin of victory		2,833	1.43	▼12.14
Turnout		1,99,013	74.80	▲6.85
Registered electors		2,66,055		▼3,232
INC hold		Swing	▼16.29	

=== 2021 ===
2021 Tamil Nadu Legislative Assembly election: Colachel
Party	Candidate	Votes	%	±%
INC	J. G. Prince	90,681	49.56	9.37
BJP	Ramesh P.	65,849	35.99	11.37
MNM	Lathis Mary S.	2,127	1.16	
DMDK	Sivakumar M.	1,332	0.73	
CPI(ML)L	Anthony Muthu S. M.	1,218	0.67	0.07
ABHM	Krishna Kumar A.	1,145	0.63	
NOTA	Nota	878	0.48	
Margin of victory		24,832	13.57	−1.99
Turnout		182,969	67.95	4.17
Registered electors		269,287		
INC hold		Swing	9.37	

=== 2016 ===
2016 Tamil Nadu Legislative Assembly election: Colachel
Party	Candidate	Votes	%	±%
INC	J. G. Prince	67,195	40.19	0.03
BJP	Ramesh P	41,167	24.62	0.03
AIADMK	K. T. Patchaimal	39,218	23.46	−8.58
MDMK	Sambathchandra R.	12,909	7.72	
NOTA	None Of The Above	1,593	0.95	
CPI(ML)L	Anthonymuthu	1,000	0.60	−0.48
PMK	Alexanderrajkumar A	772	0.46	
Independent	Selvaraj M	339	0.20	
	Aakhashdhev M	277	0.17	
Independent	Christopher M.	230	0.14	
Margin of victory		26,028	15.57	7.44
Turnout		167,205	63.78	−0.51
Registered electors		262,175		
INC hold		Swing	0.03	

=== 2011 ===
2011 Tamil Nadu Legislative Assembly election: Colachel
Party	Candidate	Votes	%	±%
INC	J. G. Prince	58,428	40.16	−6.83
AIADMK	Larence. P	46,607	32.03	13.09
BJP	Ramesh. P	35,778	24.59	−2.61
CPI(ML)L	Anthony Muthu. S. M	1,566	1.08	
Independent	Varkees Tharuma Raj. G	1,262	0.87	
BSP	Abu Thahir. A. P	872	0.60	
Independent	Kathiresan. V	537	0.37	
ABHM	Selvaraj. M	438	0.30	−0.28
Margin of victory		11,821	8.13	−11.66
Turnout		226,321	64.28	2.62
Registered electors		145,488		
INC hold		Swing	-6.83	

=== 2006 ===
2006 Tamil Nadu Legislative Assembly election: Colachel
Party	Candidate	Votes	%	±%
INC	S. Jeyapaul	50,641	46.99	
BJP	M. R. Gandhi	29,321	27.21	
AIADMK	K. T. Pachaimal	20,413	18.94	−27.29
DMDK	Wellington. S	4,941	4.58	
Independent	Linga Perumal. C	656	0.61	
ABHM	Surendran Nair. K	626	0.58	
BSP	Dharmendra Kumar. S. N	449	0.42	
Independent	Thomas. S	310	0.29	
Independent	Kumaraswamy. H	164	0.15	
Independent	Karunakaran	142	0.13	
Independent	Balakrishnan. C	109	0.10	
Margin of victory		21,320	19.78	3.31
Turnout		107,772	61.67	11.63
Registered electors		174,762		
INC gain from AIADMK		Swing	0.76	

=== 2001 ===
2001 Tamil Nadu Legislative Assembly election: Colachel
Party	Candidate	Votes	%	±%
AIADMK	K. T. Pachaimal	42,354	46.23	
MDMK	R. Sambath Chandra	27,265	29.76	17.77
DMK	Era Bernard	20,296	22.15	−20.70
Independent	A. Frederick	1,206	1.32	
NCP	C. Raja Singh	502	0.55	
Margin of victory		15,089	16.47	8.75
Turnout		91,623	50.04	−10.32
Registered electors		183,117		
AIADMK gain from DMK		Swing	3.37	

=== 1996 ===
1996 Tamil Nadu Legislative Assembly election: Colachel
Party	Candidate	Votes	%	±%
DMK	Era Bernard	41,217	42.85	
BJP	S. P. Kutty	33,791	35.13	18.07
MDMK	Sambath Chandra. R.	11,528	11.99	
INC	Pauliah. A.	8,401	8.73	−51.27
Independent	Chandra Sekhar	186	0.19	
AIIC(T)	Jaipal. J. T.	168	0.17	
Independent	Sreekumaran Thampy. A.	137	0.14	
Independent	Chandrasekaran. N.	130	0.14	
Independent	Tharchis Xavier. S.	130	0.14	
Independent	Ponnuswamy. E.	83	0.09	
Independent	Murugan. R.	71	0.07	
Margin of victory		7,426	7.72	−29.91
Turnout		96,181	60.36	4.38
Registered electors		165,972		
DMK gain from INC		Swing	-17.15	

=== 1991 ===
1991 Tamil Nadu Legislative Assembly election: Colachel
Party	Candidate	Votes	%	±%
INC	A. Pauliah	52,641	60.01	20.82
JD	Bathakbishnan R.	19,626	22.37	
BJP	Appancheyl S.	14,968	17.06	
Independent	Thomas S.	111	0.13	
Independent	Johnson M.	108	0.12	
Independent	Soosai Nayagom S.	101	0.12	
Independent	Jacobe Mianous T.	99	0.11	
Independent	Lingaraja N.	73	0.08	
Margin of victory		33,015	37.63	24.58
Turnout		87,727	55.98	−10.86
Registered electors		160,212		
INC hold		Swing	20.82	

=== 1989 ===
1989 Tamil Nadu Legislative Assembly election: Colachel
Party	Candidate	Votes	%	±%
INC	Pauliah-A. M	36,611	39.19	
DMK	Sambath Chandra-R	24,414	26.13	4.26
AIADMK	F. M. Rajarathnam	18,747	20.07	−19.26
AIADMK	Jonas	13,292	14.23	−25.10
Independent	Raveendran. A. M	187	0.20	
Independent	Soosai Michael. P. M	173	0.19	
Margin of victory		12,197	13.06	12.37
Turnout		93,424	66.84	−5.30
Registered electors		141,330		
INC gain from AIADMK		Swing	-0.14	

=== 1984 ===
1984 Tamil Nadu Legislative Assembly election: Colachel
Party	Candidate	Votes	%	±%
AIADMK	F. M. Rajarathnam	33,585	39.33	6.36
BJP	M. R. Gandhi	32,996	38.64	
DMK	N. Paramonydhas	18,678	21.87	−45.16
Independent	V. Rajendran	138	0.16	
Margin of victory		589	0.69	−33.37
Turnout		85,397	72.14	16.02
Registered electors		123,569		
AIADMK gain from DMK		Swing	-27.70	

=== 1980 ===
1980 Tamil Nadu Legislative Assembly election: Colachel
Party	Candidate	Votes	%	±%
DMK	S. Retnaraj	42,949	67.03	38.33
AIADMK	Sanotsham. M.	21,127	32.97	8.28
Margin of victory		21,822	34.06	32.36
Turnout		64,076	56.12	−6.47
Registered electors		115,330		
DMK gain from JP		Swing	36.63	

=== 1977 ===
1977 Tamil Nadu Legislative Assembly election: Colachel
Party	Candidate	Votes	%	±%
JP	R. Athiswami	21,131	30.40	
DMK	S. Retnaraj	19,949	28.70	−15.18
AIADMK	F.M. Rasarathinam	17,165	24.69	
INC	A. Pauliah	11,264	16.21	−38.78
Margin of victory		1,182	1.70	−9.40
Turnout		69,509	62.59	−8.40
Registered electors		111,755		
JP gain from INC		Swing	-24.58	

=== 1971 ===
1971 Tamil Nadu Legislative Assembly election: Colachel
Party	Candidate	Votes	%	±%
INC	A. Pauliah	37,401	54.98	6.61
DMK	S. Retnaraj	29,852	43.88	
Independent	Eugene A.	773	1.14	
Margin of victory		7,549	11.10	8.71
Turnout		68,026	70.99	−1.33
Registered electors		97,695		
INC hold		Swing	6.61	

=== 1967 ===
1967 Madras Legislative Assembly election: Colachel
Party	Candidate	Votes	%	±%
INC	A. Chidambaranatha Nadar	29,325	48.37	4.74
SWA	S. Retnaraj	27,879	45.99	
Independent	Y. Devadason	2,887	4.76	
Independent	L. Louis	532	0.88	
Margin of victory		1,446	2.39	−9.62
Turnout		60,623	72.31	−2.76
Registered electors		86,726		
INC gain from Independent		Swing	-7.27	

=== 1962 ===
1962 Madras Legislative Assembly election: Colachel
Party	Candidate	Votes	%	±%
Independent	A. Swamidhas	36,054	55.64	
INC	Lourdammal Simon	28,275	43.63	2.90
Independent	John Russel	471	0.73	
Margin of victory		7,779	12.00	7.33
Turnout		64,800	75.07	31.31
Registered electors		88,634		
Independent gain from INC		Swing	14.91	

=== 1957 ===
1957 Madras Legislative Assembly election: Colachel
Party	Candidate	Votes	%	±%
INC	Lourdammal Simon	14,055	40.73	
Independent	S. Doraiswamy	12,443	36.06	
Independent	R. K. Ram.	3,309	9.59	
Independent	P. Johnson	2,875	8.33	
Independent	S. M. Shahul Hamid	1,826	5.29	
Margin of victory		1,612	4.67	
Turnout		34,508	43.76	
Registered electors		78,859		
INC gain from TTNC		Swing		

=== 1954 ===
1954 Travancore-Cochin Legislative Assembly election: Colachel
Party	Candidate	Votes	%	±%
TTNC	Thompson Tharmaraj Daniel	15,542	59.14	
INC	Ramachandra Nadar	10,738	40.86	40.86
Margin of victory		4,804	18.28	
Turnout		26,280	69.48	
Registered electors		37,824		
TTNC win (new seat)				
