= Second Kamaraj ministry =

Government of Madras, India (1957–1962)

- Ministry of Madras State
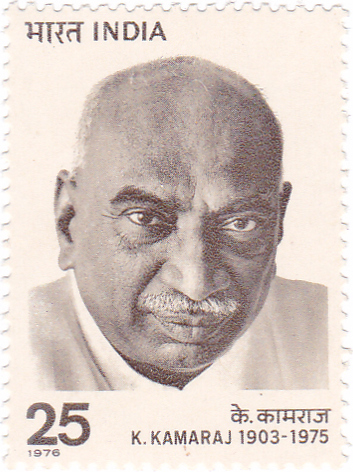
- Date formed: 1 April 1957
- Date dissolved: 1 March 1962

People and organisations
- Governor: A. J. John; Bishnuram Medhi
- Chief Minister: K. Kamaraj
- Member party: Indian National Congress

History
- Election: 1957
- Outgoing election: 1962
- Legislature term: 1957–1962
- Predecessor: First Kamaraj ministry
- Successor: Third Kamaraj ministry

The Second Kamaraj ministry was the Council of Ministers of Madras State headed by Chief Minister K. Kamaraj from 1 April 1957 to 1 March 1962.

Kamaraj's council of ministers during his second tenure as Chief Minister was as follows:

== Council of Ministers ==
Name	Office	Portfolio	Took Office	Left Office
K. Kamaraj	Chief Minister	Public Planning and Development (including Local Development Works, Women's Welfare, Community Projects and Rural Welfare), National Extension Scheme	1 April 1957	1 March 1962
M. Bhaktavatsalam	Minister	Home	1 April 1957	1 March 1962
C. Subramaniam	Minister	Finance	1 April 1957	1 March 1962
R. Venkataraman	Minister	Industries	1 April 1957	1 March 1962
M. A. Manickavelu Naicker	Minister	Revenue	1 April 1957	1 March 1962
P. Kakkan	Minister	Works	1 April 1957	1 March 1962
V. Ramaiah	Minister	Electricity	1 April 1957	1 March 1962
Lourdhammal Simon	Minister	Local Administration	1 April 1957	1 March 1962
