= United Front of Leftists =

- Founded: 1952; 73 years ago
- Headquarters: Thiruvananthapuram
- Ideology: Factions: Communism; Secularism; Socialism
- Political position: Left-wing

The United Front of Leftists (UFL) was a political alliance of the leftist and the socialist parties based in the erstwhile Indian state of Travancore–Cochin. It was created in 1952 by the political parties namely Communist Party of India, Revolutionary Socialist Party, and Kerala Socialist Party. Later, Praja Socialist Party, which was one of the strongest parties in the erstwhile Travancore–Cochin, also joined the alliance.

== See also ==
- Travancore–Cochin
- 1952 Travancore-Cochin Legislative Assembly election
- 1954 Travancore-Cochin Legislative Assembly election
- 1952 Madras Legislative Assembly election in Malabar
