= 1954 Travancore-Cochin Legislative Assembly election =

- 15 February 1954

All 117 seats in the Travancore–Cochin Legislative Assembly 59 seats needed for a majority
- Turnout: 74.07%
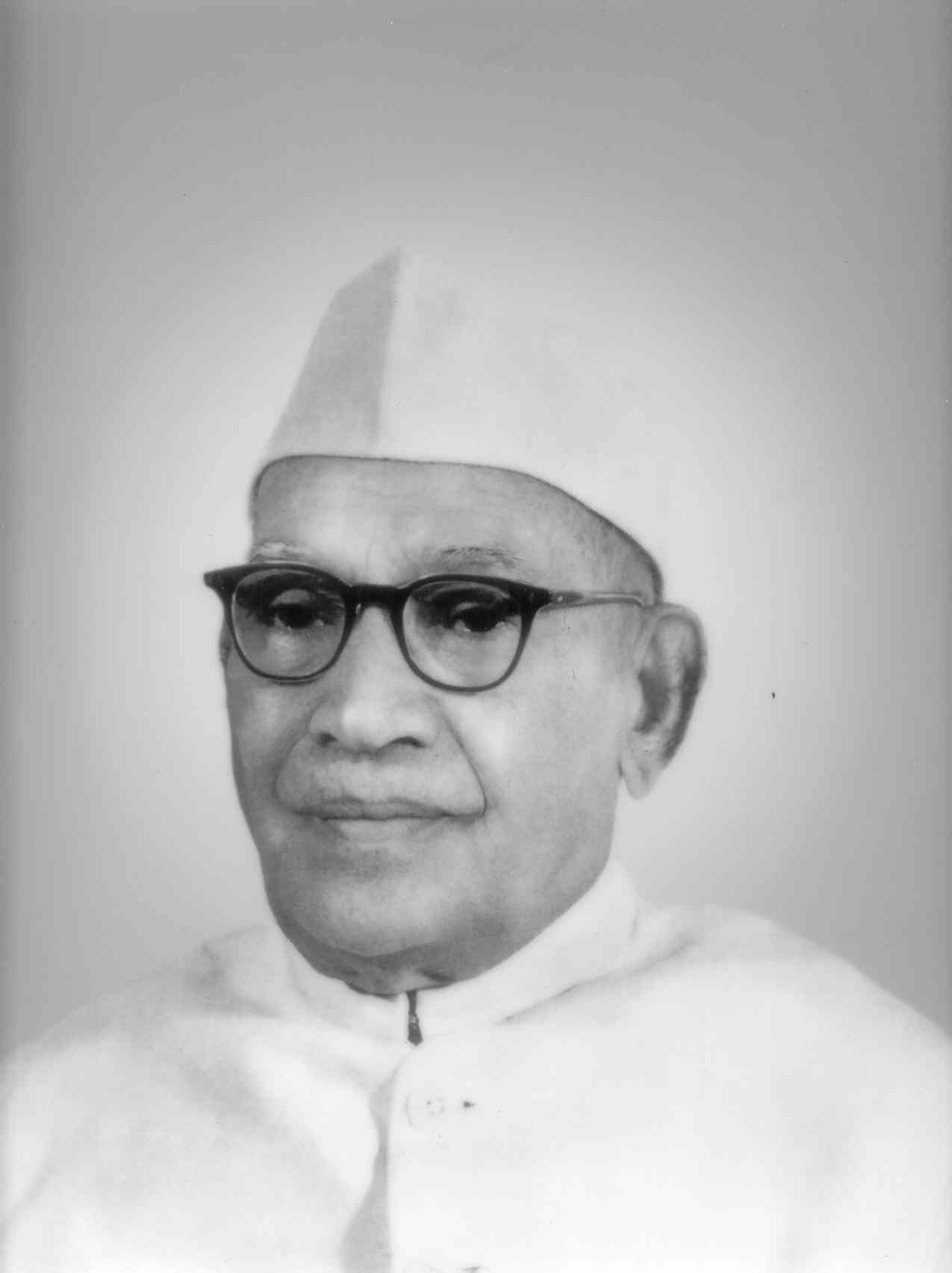
	First party	Second party	Third party
	INC	CPI
Leader	A. J. John	T. V. Thomas	Pattom Thanu Pillai
Party	INC	CPI	PSP
Alliance		UFL	UFL
Leader's seat	Poonjar	Alappuzha	Trivandrum II
Last election	44	Didn't contest	Didn't contest
Seats won	45	23	19
Seat change	▲1	New Party	New Party
Popular vote	1762820	652613	632623
Percentage	45.32	16.78	16.26
Swing	▲9.88	New	New
	Fourth party	Fifth party
Party	TTNC	RSP
Alliance		UFL
Last election	8	6
Seats won	12	9
Seat change	▲4	▲3
Popular vote	237411	212354
Percentage	6.10	5.46
Swing	▲0.18	▲1.98
- Location of Travancore-Cochin in India
Chief Minister before election
A. J. John
INC
Elected Chief Minister
Pattom Thanu Pillai
PSP

Elections to the Legislative Assembly of the Indian state of Travancore-Cochin were held on 15 February 1954. 265 candidates competed for the 106 constituencies in the Assembly. There were 11 two-member constituencies and 95 single-member constituencies. Out of these, one single member and one two-member constituency was reserved for SC. The main contest in the election was between the Indian National Congress (INC) and the United Front of Leftists (UFL). Travancore Tamil Nadu Congress was also significant in some Tamil - significant constituencies.

== Results ==
=== Summary ===
Summary of results of the 1954 Travancore-Cochin Legislative Assembly election
Political party	Flag	Seats Contested	Won	Net Change in seats	% of Seats	Votes	Vote %	Change in vote %
Indian National Congress		115	45	▲1	38.46	17,62,820	45.32	▲9.88
Communist Party of India		36	23	New	19.66	6,52,613	16.78	New
Praja Socialist Party		38	19	New	16.24	6,32,623	16.26	New
Travancore Tamil Nadu Congress		16	12	▲4	10.26	2,37,411	6.10	▲0.18
Revolutionary Socialist Party		12	9	▲3	7.69	212354	5.46	▲1.98
Independent		47	9	▼28	7.69	3,91,612	10.07	N/A
		Total seats	117 (▲9)	Voters	52,51,560	Turnout	38,89,836 (74.07%)	

=== By constituency ===
Results
Assembly Constituency			Turnout (%)	Winner				Runner Up				Winning Party	Margin
#	Name	Seats	Turnout (%)	Candidate	Party	Votes	%	Candidate	Party	Votes	%	Winning Party	Margin
1	Tovala	1	71.02	Ramaswami Pillai. S	PSP	16702	57.09	Sivarama Pillai. K	INC	8117	27.75	PSP	8585
2	Agastisvaram	1	66.67	Thanulingam Nadar. P	TTNC	15587	52.34	Balakrishnan. C	INC	8866	29.77	TTNC	6721
3	Nagercoil	1	72.23	Anantharaman. D	TTNC	14063	43.14	Sankar. C	CPI	10468	32.11	TTNC	3595
4	Neendakara	1	68.19	Chidambaranantha Nadar. A	TTNC	20169	72.83	Thomas. D	INC	7525	27.17	TTNC	12644
5	Padmanabhapuram	1	66.02	Noor Mohammed. N. A	TTNC	14684	57.59	Gregory Rajamony. V	IND	7600	29.81	TTNC	7084
6	Tiruvattar	1	56.50	Ramaswamy Pillai	TTNC	18104	88.91	Pakianathan	INC	2258	11.09	TTNC	15846
7	Colachel	1	69.48	Thompson Tharmaraj Daniel	TTNC	15542	59.14	Ramachandra Nadar	INC	10738	40.86	TTNC	4804
8	Killiyoor	1	55.16	Ponnappan Nadar	TTNC	17113	85.61	Gabriel	INC	2877	14.39	TTNC	14236
9	Vilavankod	1	67.65	William	TTNC	17291	63.87	G. S. Mony	CPI	8274	30.56	TTNC	9017
10	Kollenkode	1	75.95	Alexander Manuel Simon	TTNC	17936	57.04	Doraswamy	INC	13509	42.96	TTNC	4427
11	Parassala	1	73.94	Kunjan Nadar	TTNC	11140	48.50	Stuart (Isaac)	CPI	8688	37.83	TTNC	2452
12	Kunnathukal	1	67.32	Krishna Pillai	PSP	11669	51.60	D. Gana Sigamony	TTNC	8616	38.10	PSP	3053
13	Kottukal	1	74.12	Vivekanandan	IND	11284	45.07	Jacob Kadaksham	TTNC	7044	28.14	IND	4240
14	Nemom	1	73.61	Vishwambaran	PSP	15582	64.32	G. Chandrasekhara Pillai	INC	8643	35.68	PSP	6939
15	Neyyatinkara	1	73.97	M. Bhaskaran Nair	INC	12742	53.08	Krishna Pillai	PSP	11265	46.92	INC	1477
16	Karakulam	1	66.57	R. Balakrishna Pillai	CPI	13635	63.17	V. Kesavan Nair	INC	7951	36.83	CPI	5684
17	Palode	1	64.93	N. Chandrasekharan Nair	PSP	12374	56.68	K. Bhaskaran	INC	9458	43.32	PSP	2916
18	Nedumangad	1	68.31	K. Neelakantaru Pandarathil	CPI	14514	68.78	K. P. Alikunju	INC	6588	31.22	CPI	7926
19	Trivandrum I	1	68.64	Nataraja Pillai	PSP	14121	57.64	K. R. Elankath	INC	10191	41.60	PSP	3930
20	Trivandrum II	1	68.90	A. Thanu Pillai	PSP	15130	62.57	K. P. Neelakanta Pillai	IND	7724	31.94	PSP	7406
21	Trivandrum III	1	60.98	K. Balakrishnan	RSP	13583	61.47	C. R. Das	INC	8112	36.71	RSP	5471
22	Ollur	2	130.13 (Two seats)	Sreedharan; P. Kunjan	CPI; PSP	25660; 24911	29.19; 28.34	Gopi; Krishna Sasthri	INC; INC	17100; 15792	19.45; 17.96	CPI; PSP	-
23	Chirayinkil	1	75.39	U. Neelakantan	IND	12841	51.96	P. Nanu	INC	11871	48.04	IND	970
24	Attingal	1	73.92	R. Prakasam	CPI	15342	60.74	G. Krishna Pillai	INC	9917	39.26	CPI	5425
25	Varkala	2	145.69 (Two seats)	Kochukunju; Majeed	PSP; IND	30226; 29956	30.68; 30.41	Achutan; K. Shahul Hameed	INC; INC	19660; 18670	19.96; 18.95	PSP; IND	-
26	Paravur	1	81.14	Ravindran	CPI	15551	56.56	Gopala Pillai	INC	11673	42.46	CPI	3878
27	Eravipuram	2	154.76 (Two seats)	Chandrasekharan; Sukumaran	RSP; CPI	34038; 33276	30.82; 30.13	Fernandez; Krishnan	INC; INC	22341; 20785	20.23; 18.82	RSP; CPI	-
28	Quilon (SC)	1	78.51	T. K. Divakaran	RSP	20063	59.09	R. Sankar	INC	13888	40.91	RSP	6175
29	Trikkadavur	1	79.16	Prakkulam Bhasi	RSP	16686	59.66	Balakrishna Pillai	INC	11157	39.89	RSP	5529
30	Chavara	1	84.87	Baby John	RSP	16552	53.53	Kunju Krishnan	INC	14377	46.48	RSP	2175
31	Karunagappalli	1	83.63	A. A. Rahim	INC	15983	51.19	T. A. Moideen Kunju	IND	15242	48.81	INC	741
32	Krishnapuram	1	79.02	P. P. Kunju	PSP	18835	62.14	P. K. Lakshmanan	INC	11478	37.86	PSP	7357
33	Bharanikavu (SC)	2	152.00 (Two seats)	Bhaskaran Pillai; Kuttappan	CPI; CPI	39254; 36469	32.81; 30.48	Kandan Kali; Raghavan	INC; INC	22231; 19283	18.58; 16.12	CPI; CPI	-
34	Kunnathur	2	154.05 (Two seats)	Madhavan Pillai; K. S. Krishna Sasthri	CPI; RSP	29283; 29002	27.49; 27.23	Adichan; Bhaskaran Nair	INC; INC	23505; 23436	22.07; 22.00	CPI; RSP	-
35	Kottarakara	1	76.00	B. B. Pandarathil	RSP	17659	61.46	Raman Pillai	INC	11073	38.54	RSP	6586
36	Veliyam	1	77.44	Damodaran Potti	PSP	16862	65.73	Chandapillai Panicker	INC	8791	34.27	PSP	8071
37	Chadayamangalam	1	69.68	V. Gangadharan	PSP	17291	69.31	Muhammad	INC	7657	30.69	PSP	9634
38	Punalur	1	78.47	Gopalan	IND	15574	56.16	Padmanabha Pillai	INC	12157	43.84	IND	3417
39	Shencotta	1	72.91	K. Sattanatha Karayalar	IND	14092	55.79	Ramachandra Iyer	INC	11166	44.21	IND	2926
40	Pathanapuram	1	81.27	Velayudhan Nair	INC	14172	51.32	M. N. Govindhan Nair	CPI	13445	48.68	INC	727
41	Ranni	1	82.14	Idiculla Idiculla	PSP	16485	57.12	V. O. Markos	INC	12377	42.88	PSP	4108
42	Pathanamthitta	1	77.01	P. S. Vasudevan Pillai	INC	13364	45.09	P. Raman Pillai	IND	12538	42.30	INC	826
43	Omallur	1	75.38	N. G. Chacko	INC	16625	56.24	V. M. Kurien	PSP	12935	43.76	INC	3690
44	Ezhumattur	1	81.50	T. M. Varghese	INC	14906	56.25	Saramma Mathew	PSP	11594	43.75	INC	3312
45	Tiruvalla	1	74.54	Chandrasekharan Pillai. M. P	INC	14421	52.53	Mamman	PSP	13032	47.47	INC	1389
46	Chengannur	2	141.35 (Two seats)	Ramachandran Nair. C. K P. K. Kunjachan	PSP; CPI	27757; 27316	27.54; 27.10	Ramachandra Das; Velayudhan	INC; INC	23930; 21801	23.74; 21.63	PSP; CPI	-
47	Kadapra	1	71.12	Parameswaran Nambudiri	PSP	15817	53.76	Sadasivan Pillai	INC	13607	46.24	PSP	2210
48	Mavelikara	1	73.71	R. Sankara Narayanan Tampi	CPI	20746	63.51	P. Balakrishnan Tampi	INC	11792	36.10	CPI	8954
49	Pattiyur	1	78.45	Yesodharan	RSP	19142	63.13	Bhanu	INC	10276	33.89	RSP	8866
50	Kartikapally	1	78.44	A. Achyuthen	PSP	17863	59.20	A. P. Udayabhanu	INC	12309	40.80	PSP	5554
51	Ambalapuzha	1	73.39	Narayanan Potti	RSP	17486	63.63	Sankara Pillai	INC	9994	36.37	RSP	7492
52	Alleppey I	1	80.26	K. C. George	CPI	16703	54.16	Balakrishnan Nair	INC	14135	45.84	CPI	2568
53	Alleppey II	1	84.39	T. V. Thomas	CPI	18569	54.80	Abdulla	INC	15319	45.20	CPI	3250
54	Mararikulam	1	82.53	R. Sugathan	CPI	18447	56.32	Karunakara Thandar	INC	14308	43.68	CPI	4139
55	Shertala	1	75.95	K. R. Gouri	CPI	21042	63.16	Aiyappan	INC	12273	36.84	CPI	8769
56	Turavur	1	84.77	Sadasivan	CPI	16515	53.43	P. S. Karthikeyan	INC	14396	46.57	CPI	2119
57	Arur	1	78.00	Aviratharaken	IND	11504	36.96	P. V. Varkey Tharakan	INC	10832	34.80	IND	672
58	Takazhi	1	73.62	Narayana Kurup	INC	15205	55.75	Kumara Pillai	RSP	12069	44.25	INC	3136
59	Kalloppara	1	71.84	Mathai	INC	16219	60.42	Mathew. K. A	PSP	9633	35.88	INC	6586
60	Manimala	1	77.00	Korah	INC	14780	56.03	Rosamma	IND	11598	43.97	INC	3182
61	Vazhur	1	76.33	Narayana Kurup	PSP	14489	51.91	Narayanan	INC	13422	48.09	PSP	1067
62	Kurichi	1	81.59	Sebastian	INC	16659	54.60	Thomas	IND	13851	45.40	INC	2808
63	Changanacherry	1	70.47	Parameswaran Pillai	INC	16866	61.81	Rajasekharan Nair	RSP	10421	38.19	INC	6445
64	Tiruvarppu	1	84.29	Raghava Kurup	CPI	17523	52.10	Kesava Panicker	INC	16109	47.90	CPI	1414
65	Kottayam	1	84.19	Bhaskaran Nair	CPI	16955	52.49	P. C. Cherian	INC	15348	47.51	CPI	4.98
66	Puthuppalli	1	82.72	Thomas	INC	18742	59.71	Zacharia	PSP	12645	40.29	INC	6097
67	Vijayapuram	1	81.33	Markose	INC	18515	61.44	Sreedharan Nair	IND	11620	38.56	INC	6895
68	Ettumanur	1	82.25	Sebastian	INC	20625	63.08	Abraham	PSP	12070	36.92	INC	8555
69	Ramapuram	1	79.09	Joseph	IND	16779	58.28	Sebastian	INC	12011	41.72	IND	4768
70	Meenachil	1	76.46	Prof.K.M. Chandy	INC	18105	60.24	Ulahannan	PSP	11951	39.76	INC	6154
71	Poonjar	1	65.23	John	INC	17121	77.51	Joseph	PSP	4967	22.49	INC	12154
72	Todupuzha	1	60.97	Chacko	INC	13609	67.92	Augustine	IND	6427	32.08	INC	7182
73	Devicolam	2	125.63 (Two seats)	Seshadrinatha Sarma; Thankaiah	TTNC; TTNC	28596; 25853	25.78; 23.31	Ganapathy; Deviappan	INC; INC	21266; 20451	19.17; 18.44	TTNC; TTNC	-
74	Kanjirappalli	1	76.03	Thomas (Son of Thomas)	INC	13730	51.90	Thomas (Son of Jacob)	PSP	12239	46.32	INC	1491
75	Vaikom	1	79.05	C. K. Viswanathan	CPI	19367	56.75	V. Madhavan	INC	14760	43.25	CPI	4607
76	Kaduthuruthi	2	155.41 (Two seats)	K. M. George; T. T. Kesava Sasthri	INC; INC	36739; 36459	30.00; 29.77	K. M. Kuriakose; Sivadas	PSP; PSP	25556; 23706	20.87; 19.36	INC; INC	-
77	Muvattupuzha	1	82.36	M. V. Cherian	INC	21174	63.58	K. T. Jacob	CPI	11801	35.44	INC	9373
78	Kumaramangalam	1	71.28	Mathew	INC	18701	76.79	Krishna Pillai	RSP	5654	23.21	INC	13047
79	Pallivasal	1	67.18	Joseph. V. J	INC	16922	58.84	Kuruvilla	CPI	11837	41.16	INC	5085
80	Kothyamangalam	1	76.73	Manjanatha Prabhu	PSP	14887	50.18	Varkey	INC	14783	49.82	PSP	104
81	Kunnatnad	2	158.73 (Two seats)	Chanko; Kochukuttan	INC; INC	35969; 35039	28.85; 28.10	Kesava Pillai; Manian	PSP; PSP	28550; 25132	22.90; 20.16	INC; INC	-
82	Palliviruthi	1	77.31	Alexander	INC	18871	53.96	Sivasankaran	IND	16102	46.04	INC	2769
83	Mattancheri	1	67.67	Anantha Bhatt	INC	13628	54.09	Gangadharan	CPI	11567	45.91	INC	2061
84	Kanayannur	1	65.54	Kumaran	INC	12748	49.87	Ramakrishnan	CPI	12287	48.07	INC	461
85	Elankulam	1	76.75	Padmanabha Menon	IND	17404	53.68	Pylee	INC	15015	46.32	IND	2389
86	Ernakulam	1	75.96	O.R.Chummar	INC	17309	57.56	Krishna Pillai	IND	12760	42.44	INC	4549
87	Narakkal	1	84.72	Abraham	INC	18921	51.55	Mathai	IND	17783	48.45	INC	1138
88	Alwaye	1	78.62	Bava	INC	16891	54.38	Abdul Khadir	IND	14170	45.62	INC	2721
89	Alangad	1	78.14	Gopala Menon	INC	17439	50.85	Raman Menon	PSP	16855	49.15	INC	584
90	Parur	1	82.86	Balan	CPI	19102	51.21	E. K. Madhavan	INC	18198	48.79	CPI	904
91	Perumbavur	1	83.61	Poulose	INC	17416	54.98	Ramakrishna Iyer	IND	14263	45.02	INC	3153
92	Kothakulangara	1	77.53	M. A. Antony	INC	21774	71.23	K. V. Parameswar	IND	8793	28.77	INC	12981
93	Cranganur	1	79.95	Abdul Khadir	INC	15613	51.12	Gopalakrishna Menon	CPI	14931	48.88	INC	682
94	Irinjalakkuda	2	148.55 (Two seats)	K. V. Balakrishnan; Chathan Kavalan	INC; CPI	30887; 28833	26.59; 24.82	Ittira Ambookan; C. L. Davassy	INC; PSP	28753; 27708	24.75; 23.85	INC; CPI	-
95	Chalakkudi	1	81.43	P. Govinda Menon	INC	21236	62.99	K. K. Thomas	IND	12476	37.01	8760	
96	Kodakara	1	70.39	P. Kesava Menon	PSP	14649	55.60	K. K. Kesavan	INC	11696	44.40	PSP	2953
97	Puthukkad	1	80.63	T. P. Sitaramayyar	INC	15060	51.48	C. Achuta Menon	CPI	14196	48.52	INC	864
98	Cherpu	1	80.57	Mundasssery Joseph	IND	16844	52.34	Krishnankutty Menon	INC	15336	47.66	IND	1508
99	Ollur	1	67.74	Krishnan Ponganammula	INC	14930	54.10	Soolapani Warrier	IND	12667	45.90	INC	2263
100	Manalur	1	81.74	Kannoth Karunakaran	INC	16492	53.45	Prabhakaran	CPI	14365	46.55	INC	2127
101	Trichur	1	77.17	Panengadan Anthony	INC	14956	54.55	Krishna Vilasom	CPI	12463	45.45	INC	2493
102	Viyyur	1	69.06	Krishna Vilasom	INC	15261	53.40	Brahmakulam Anthony	PSP	13316	46.60	INC	1945
103	Kunnamkulam	1	74.36	Thalekkare Krishnan	CPI	15489	51.01	Mathew Cheruvathur	INC	14877	48.99	CPI	612
104	Vadakkancheri	2	123.49 (Two seats)	Ayyappan; Achutha Menon	CPI; INC	25487; 24578	26.54; 25.60	Balakrishna Menon; Koman	PSP; INC	24073; 21885	25.07; 22.79	CPI; INC	-
105	Nemmara	1	63.44	Sivarama Bharathy. K. A	PSP	11773	52.95	Krishnan	INC	10461	47.05	PSP	1312
106	Chittur	1	60.30	A. R. Menon	INC	11031	50.03	Subramania Mudaliar	PSP	7973	36.16	INC	3058

== State reorganization and merger ==
On 1 November 1956, under the States Reorganisation Act, 1956, Kerala was formed by the merger of Travancore-Cochin state with the Malabar district (including Fort Cochin and the Laccadive Islands) of Madras State, Kasaragod taluk of the South Canara district and the Amindive Islands. The southern part of Travancore-Cochin, the five taluks of Agastheeswaram, Thovala, Kalkulam, Vilavahcode and Shencotta, were transferred from Travancore-Cochin to the Madras State. After the reorganization, the assembly constituencies increased from 106 with 117 seats in 1954 to 114 with 126 seats in 1957.

== See also ==
- 1954 elections in India
- Travancore-Cochin
- 1952 Travancore-Cochin Legislative Assembly election
- 1952 Madras Legislative Assembly election in Malabar
- 1957 Kerala Legislative Assembly election
