= Era Bernard =

Indian politician

Era Bernard was an Indian politician and former Member of the Legislative Assembly. He was elected to the Tamil Nadu Legislative Assembly as Dravida Munnetra Kazhagam candidate from Colachel constituency in Kanyakumari district in 1996 election.
