= Cochin Party =

Former Indian political party

The Cochin Party was a political party in Cochin, India. The party was founded in 1949 by C.V. Iyyu, Kunhirama Menon and others. Although the party had no links as such with the Cochin Praja Mandal, some of its leaders had been members of that group. The party opposed integration of Cochin into a joint state with Travancore, and raised the slogan 'Cochin for Cochinites'. It sought to maintain a separate Cochin state. The party had a right-wing profile.

The election symbol of the party was a flower. The party presented twelve candidates in the 1951 Travancore-Cochin Legislative Assembly election. In total the candidates of the party obtained 59,535 votes (1.75% of the votes in the state). One candidate of the party was elected, Ayyappan from the Wadankancherry constituency (which had two seats, the other being won by the Socialist Party). The party fielded one candidate in the 1951 Lok Sabha election, Ephrahim Moovamby in the Crangannur seat. He obtained 8,947 votes (3.74% of the votes in the constituency). By the 1954 elections the party had disappeared.
