= Tamil Nadu People Front =

Indian political party

The Tamilnad People's Front was a political party in Travancore-Cochin, India. The party advocated that five taluks in the eastern and southern parts of the Travancore should have been transferred to the neighbouring Madras state. The party fielded two candidates in the 1951 Travancore-Cochin Legislative Assembly election, whom together obtained 4,025 votes. The election symbol of the party was a bow and arrow.
