= R. Athiswami =

Indian politician

R. Athiswami was an Indian politician and former Member of the Legislative Assembly. He was elected to the Tamil Nadu legislative assembly as a Janata Party candidate from Colachel constituency in Kanyakumari district in 1977 election.
