= Travancore Cochin Republican Praja Party =

- President: A.C.M. Anthraper
- General Secretary: A.V. George
- Founded: 1951
- Dissolved: 1952
- Political position: Right-wing
- Regional affiliation: Travancore-Cochin
- Travancore-Cochin Legislative Assembly: 0 / 108

The Travancore Cochin Republican Praja Party was a political party in Travancore-Cochin, India. The party was floated in 1951 by a group of wealthy plantation owners, led by A.V. George from Kottayam. This sector of plantation owners distrusted the Indian National Congress following the independence of India. A.V. George was the general secretary of the party and A.C.M. Anthraper was its president. The party had a right-wing profile.

The party fielded seven candidates in the 1951 Travancore-Cochin Legislative Assembly election. In spite of having plenty of money for their campaign, none of its candidates were elected. Together they obtained 53,034 votes (1.56% of the votes in the state). A.V. George himself finished in second place in the Kottayam constituency, with 8,649 votes (29.07%).

The party was dissolved in 1952.
