= C.C. Ayyappan =

Indian politician

C.C. Ayyappan

C.C. Ayyappan (1920-1960) was an Indian politician.

Ayyappan was born in 1920. He studied up to Pre-Degree. He was active in the struggle for social upliftment of Dalits.

He was elected as the Cochin Party candidate for the Scheduled Castes reserved seat of the Wadakkanchery constituency in the 1952 Travancore-Cochin Legislative Assembly election. Ayyappan won the reserved seat, obtaining 11,085 votes - defeating the socialist candidate Karappan by a margin of 282 votes. Ayyappan was the sole winning candidate of the Cochin Party.

In the subsequent 1954 Travancore-Cochin Legislative Assembly election he contested the Wadakkanchery reserved seat as a Communist Party of India candidate. He retained the seat, obtaining 25,487 votes against 21,885 votes for the Indian National Congress candidate Koman.

After the creation of the Kerala state, he was re-elected from the Wadakkanchery constituency in the 1957 Kerala Legislative Assembly election. He obtained 33,161 votes. In the Kerala Legislative Assembly, he was the chairman of the Committee on Petitions for the periods of 1957-1958 and 1958-1959. He lost the Wadakkanchery seat in the 1960 Kerala Legislative Assembly election, obtaining 44,199 votes. C.C. Ayyappan died later the same year.
