= S. Jeyapaul =

Indian politician

S. Jeyapaul was an Indian politician and Member of the Legislative Assembly. He was elected to the Tamil Nadu legislative assembly as an Indian National Congress candidate from Colachel constituency in Kanyakumari district in 2006 election.

He died in Chennai in a private hospital after a brief illness on July 25, 2010. He was 55 years old at the time of his death and was survived by wife, two sons and a daughter.
