= F. M. Rajarathnam =

Indian politician

F. M. Rajarathnam was an Indian politician and former Member of the Legislative Assembly. He was elected to the Tamil Nadu legislative assembly as an Anna Dravida Munnetra Kazhagam candidate from Colachel constituency in Kanyakumari district in 1984 election.
