= Third Kamaraj ministry =

Government of Madras, India (1962–1963)

- Ministry of Madras State
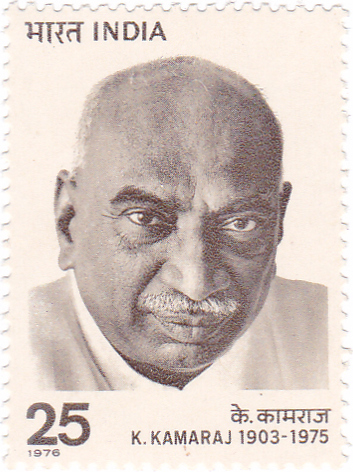
- Date formed: 3 March 1962
- Date dissolved: 2 October 1963

People and organisations
- Governor: Bishnuram Medhi
- Chief Minister: K. Kamaraj
- Member party: Indian National Congress

History
- Election: 1962
- Outgoing election: 1967
- Legislature term: 1962–1967
- Predecessor: Second Kamaraj ministry
- Successor: Bhaktavatsalam ministry

The Third Kamaraj ministry was the Council of Ministers of Madras State headed by Chief Minister K. Kamaraj from 3 March 1962 to 2 October 1963.

Kamaraj's council of ministers during his third tenure as Chief Minister was as follows:

== Council of Ministers ==
Name	Office	Portfolio	Took Office	Left Office
K. Kamaraj	Chief Minister	Public Planning and Development (including Local Development Works, Women's Welfare, Community Projects and Rural Welfare), National Extension Scheme	3 March 1962	2 October 1963
M. Bhaktavatsalam	Minister	Finance and Education	3 March 1962	2 October 1963
Jothi Venkatachalam	Minister	Public Health	3 March 1962	2 October 1963
R. Venkataraman	Minister	Revenue	3 March 1962	2 October 1963
S. M. Abdul Majid	Minister	Local Administration	3 March 1962	2 October 1963
P. Kakkan	Minister	Agriculture	3 March 1962	2 October 1963
N. Nallasenapathi Sarkarai Mandradiar	Minister	Cooperation, Forests	3 March 1962	2 October 1963
G. Bhuvaraghan	Minister	Publicity and Information	3 March 1962	2 October 1963
