= A. Pauliah =

Indian politician

A. Pauliah was an Indian politician and former Member of the Legislative Assembly. He was elected to the Tamil Nadu Legislative Assembly as an Indian National Congress (Organisation) candidate from the Colachel constituency in the 1971 election and as an Indian National Congress candidate in the 1989 and 1991 elections.
