= J. G. Prince =

Indian politician

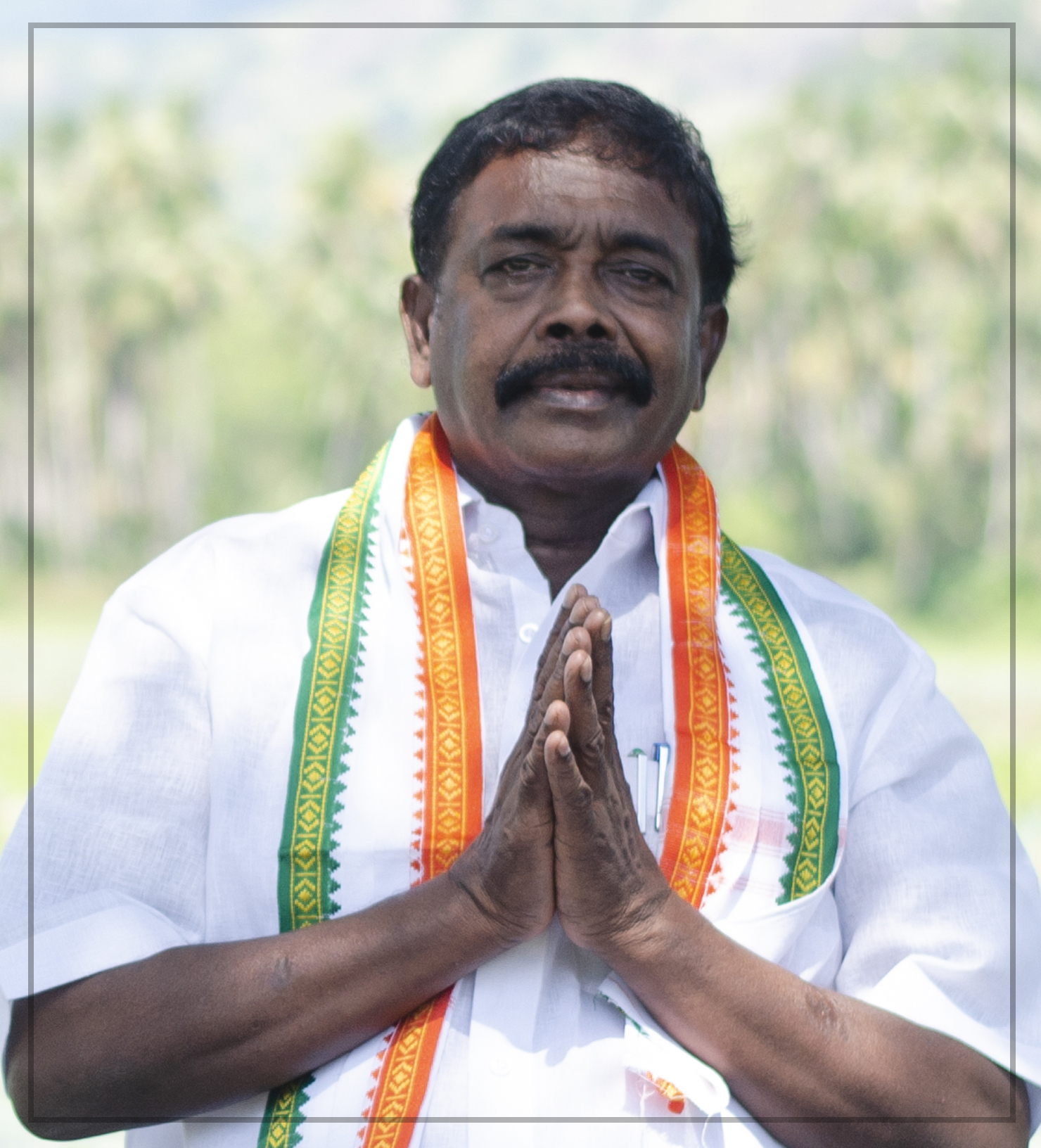

Member of Tamil Nadu Legislative Assembly
- In office 13 May 2011 – 4 May 2026
- Constituency: Colachel

Personal details
- Born: 7 May 1958 (age 68)
- Citizenship: Indian
- Party: Indian National Congress
- Spouse: Helen Joy
- Children: Donal, Donish
- Education: M.A., B.L.,
- Profession: Farmer, Politician
- Nickname: Prince

J. Gnana Prince is an Indian politician and incumbent member of the Tamil Nadu Legislative Assembly from the Colachel constituency. He represents the Indian National Congress party. He is one of the pillars of the Kanyakumari district congress. Has been serving the party since the age of 17 without changing loyalty and made the Colachel constituency a stronghold for the party. He won the 2011 and 2016 elections in Colachel constituency and in 2016 he was appointed Deputy Leader CLP, Tamil Nadu Assembly Member, AICC. As of 2021, he has 205 criminal cases pending against him.

== Early life and education ==
J. G. Prince was born on 17 May 1958 in Sama Villai, Tamil Nadu, to J. Gnana Silkhamony and V. Gnana Flora Bamy. He did his schooling at LMS School, Palliyadi and he completed a Bachelor of Law, (B.L.), Bangalore University, and Master of Arts, (M.A.), Annamalai University.

== Achievements as a DCC President ==
- Enrolled l Lakh new members to the party.
- Purchased 23 ¾ cents land for constructing the party office.
- Enrolled 25,000 labourers in the Trade Union.
- Enlarged party base in Kanyakumari District by various social programs.
- The largest party in Kanyakumari District as evidence it won all the 3 contested Assembly Constituencies with the remarkable margin of votes.

== Electoral performance ==
Year	Constituency	Party	Result	Votes	Vote %
2011	Colachel	INC	Won	58,428	40.16%
2016	Colachel	INC	Won	67,195	40.19%
2021	Colachel	INC	Won	90,681	49.56%
