= C. K. Viswanathan =

Indian politician

C. K. Viswanathan (22 November 1922 - 24 February 2002) was an Indian politician and a leader of the Communist Party of India. He was a member of the Travancore–Cochin Legislative Assembly, representing the Vaikom constituency in 1952 and 1954. He is the father of Rajya Sabha member Binoy Viswam.
