= K. T. Pachaimal =

Indian politician

K. T. Pachaimal is an Indian politician and former member of the Tamil Nadu legislative assembly from Kanyakumari constituency. He represents Anna Dravida Munnetra Kazhagam party and won in the 2011 Tamil Nadu Legislative Assembly election. He is a former minister.

He joined Tamilaga Vettri Kazhagam in the Head office of TVK in Chennai on 13 June 2026.
