= Lourdammal Simon =

Indian politician

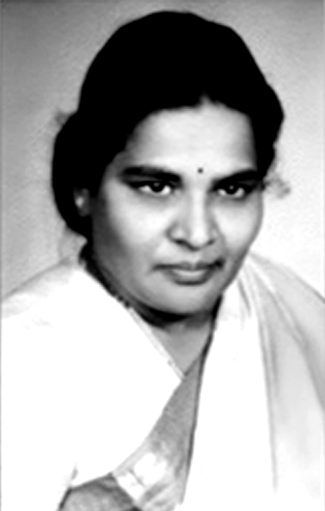
Lourdammal Simon

Lourdammal Simon (26 September 1912 – 4 May 2002) was an Indian politician and former Member of the Legislative Assembly and Minister for Local Administration and Fisheries of Madras State during 1957–1962.

== Local Administration Minister ==
She was elected to the Tamil Nadu legislative assembly as an Indian National Congress candidate from Colachel constituency in Kanyakumari district in 1957 election. She served as the Local Administration and Fisheries minister in the second Kamaraj cabinet.
