= 1952 Travancore-Cochin Legislative Assembly election =

- 27 March 1952

All 108 seats in the Travancore–Cochin Legislative Assembly 55 seats needed for a majority
- Turnout: 74.07%
| | First party | Second party | Third party |
|---|---|---|---|
| | INC | | TTNC |
| Leader | A. J. John |
| Party | INC | Socialist | TTNC |
| Leader's seat | Poonjar |
| Seats won | 44 | 11 | 8 |
| Percentage | 35.44% | 14.28 | 5.92 |
- Location of Travancore-Cochin in India
CM before election
C. Kesavan
INC
Elected CM
Anaparambil Joseph John
INC

Elections to the Legislative Assembly of the Indian state of Travancore-Cochin were held on 27 March 1952.

== Constituencies ==
Travancore-Cochin had 97 constituencies, 11 of them were two-member constituencies and 86 were single-member constituencies. There were 33,65,955 electors in the single member constituencies, while 8,44,389 electors in two-member constituencies. Total 437 candidates competed for 108 seats of the 97 constituencies in the Assembly.

== Political parties ==
Three national parties (Indian National Congress, Revolutionary Socialist Party and Socialist Party) along with four state parties (Cochin Party, Travancore Cochin Republican Praja Party, Travancore Tamil Nadu Congress and Tamil Nadu Toilers Party) and two registered unrecognized party (Kerala Socialist Party and Tamil Nadu People Front) took part in the electoral process of 1951-1952 assembly elections. Since Communist Party of India was banned in Travancore-Cochin State, its candidates took part in the electoral process as Independent candidates, which later formed a United Left front of leftists following the success in the elections.

== Results ==
Congress party fell short of the majority by 11 seats. So it formed a coalition government with the help of Travancore Tamil Nadu Congress, Kerala Socialist Party and a Nominated member.

Summary of results of the 1952 Travancore-Cochin Legislative Assembly election
| Political party | Flag | Seats Contested | Won | % of Seats | Votes | Vote % |
|---|---|---|---|---|---|---|
| Indian National Congress | | 105 | 44 | 40.74 | 12,04,364 | 35.44 |
| Socialist Party | | 70 | 11 | 10.19 | 4,85,194 | 14.28 |
| Travancore Tamil Nadu Congress | | 15 | 8 | 7.41 | 2,01,118 | 5.92 |
| Cochin Party | | 12 | 1 | 0.93 | 59,535 | 1.75 |
| Revolutionary Socialist Party | | 11 | 6 | 5.56 | 1,18,333 | 3.48 |
| Kerala Socialist Party | | 10 | 1 | 0.93 | 73,981 | 2.18 |
| Independent | | 199 | 37 | 34.26 | 11,51,555 | 33.89 |
| Total seats | | 108 | Voters | 50,54,733 | Turnout | 33,98,193 (67.23%) |

== Elected members ==
Source: ECI

| Constituency | Member | Party |
|---|---|---|
| Thovala Agasteeswaram | Samraj, A. | Socialist Party |
| Thovala Agasteeswaram | Ramaswamy Pillai, T. S. | Socialist Party |
| Nagercoil | Sankar, C. | Independent |
| Braniel | A. K. Chellaiyh | Travancore Tamil Nadu Congress |
| Braniel | A. Chidambaranatha Nadar | Travancore Tamil Nadu Congress |
| Nayyattinkara | Chandrasekharapillai | Indian National Congress |
| Parassala | Nadar, Kaujan | Independent |
| Kottukal | Morais, J. T. | Indian National Congress |
| Kazhakkoottam | Sreedharan, V . | Independent |
| Aryanad | Kesavan Nair, R. | Indian National Congress |
| Nedumangad | Pandarathil, Neelacandaran | Independent |
| Varkala | Majeed | Independent |
| Paravoor | Raveendran | Independent |
| Paravoor | Kesavan, C. | Indian National Congress |
| Chadayamangalam | Kunju, Kochu | Socialist Party |
| Chadayamangalam | Kesavapillai | Indian National Congress |
| Pattazhi | Nair, Velayudhan | Indian National Congress |
| Pathanapuram | Nair, Rajagopalan | Independent |
| Shencottah | Karayalar, Sattanatha | Independent |
| Kunnathur | Aadichan | Indian National Congress |
| Kunnathur | Unnithan, Madhavan | Indian National Congress |
| Karunagappilly | Raghavanpillai | Independent |
| Puthuppally | Karunakaran | Independent |
| Bharanikavu | Nair, Govindan | Independent |
| Bharanikavu | Kuttappan | Independent |
| Mavelikara | Chellappanpillai, K. K. | Indian National Congress |
| Kadapra | Sadasivanpillai | Indian National Congress |
| Chengannur | Das, Ramachandra | Indian National Congress |
| Chengannur | Nair, Sivaraman | Independent |
| Kallupara | Ninan, O. C. | Indian National Congress |
| Thiruvellah | Chacko | Indian National Congress |
| Pathanamthitta | Vasudevanpillai | Indian National Congress |
| Omallur | Rawther, Pareed | Indian National Congress |
| Ranni | Varghese | Indian National Congress |
| Muthukulam | Bhanu, K. | Indian National Congress |
| Alleppy I | Thomas, T. V. | Independent |
| Alleppy II | Sugathan, R. | Independent |
| Thanneermuklom | Sadasivan | Independent |
| Shertallay | Kumara Panicker, C. K. | Independent |
| Thuravoor | Gouri, K. R. | Independent |
| Aroor | Aviratharakan | Independent |
| Changanaserry | Kesavan Sastry, T. | Indian National Congress |
| Changanaserry | Korah, K. M. | Indian National Congress |
| Kangirappilly | Thomas, K. J. | Independent |
| Vazhoor | Varkey | Indian National Congress |
| Vijayapuram | Thomas, P. T. | Indian National Congress |
| Thiruvorppu | Raghava Kurup, N. | Independent |
| Kottayam | Nair, Bhaskaran | Independent |
| Ettumanoor | James | Indian National Congress |
| Meenachil | Mathew, M. C. | Indian National Congress |
| Poonjar | John, A. J. | Indian National Congress |
| Ramapuram | Kappan, Cherian J. | Indian National Congress |
| Uzhavoor | Chandy, K. M. | Indian National Congress |
| Kaduthuruthy | Madhavan | Indian National Congress |
| Vaikom | Viswanathan, C. K. | Independent |
| Piravam | Cherian, M. V. | Indian National Congress |
| Moovattupuzha | Varghese, N. P. | Indian National Congress |
| Kothamangalam | Varghese | Independent |
| Kumaramangalam | Chacko, A. C. | Indian National Congress |
| Thodupuzha | George, K. M. | Indian National Congress |
| Devicolam Peermede | Ganapathy | Indian National Congress |
| Devicolam Peermede | Kangany, Deviappan | Travancore Tamil Nadu Congress |
| Perumbavoor | Govindapillai | Independent |
| Kunnathunad | Mathai | Independent |
| Alwaye | Abdulkadir | Independent |
| Kothakulangara | Kunjithommen | Independent |
| Ayiroor | Krishna Menon, K. P. | Independent |
| Parur | Menon, Sreevallabha | Independent |
| Alengad | Varghese, E. P. | Independent |
| Kanayannur | Ayyappan | Indian National Congress |
| Ernakulam | Arackal, Jacob | Indian National Congress |
| Mattancherry | Pylee, L. M. | Indian National Congress |
| Narakkal | Ramakrishnan | Independent |
| Crangannur | Gopalakrishna Menon | Independent |
| Poomangalam | Joseph | Indian National Congress |
| Chalakudy | Govinda Menon, P. | Indian National Congress |
| Amballur | Varunni | Indian National Congress |
| Amballur | Kochukutten | Indian National Congress |
| Irinjalakuda | Warrier, Krishnankutty | Independent |
| Urakom | Velayudhan | Indian National Congress |
| Manalur | Prabhakaran | Independent |
| Trichur | Menon, Achutha | Independent |
| Viyyur | Karunakaran | Indian National Congress |
| Kuanamkulam | Krishnan | Independent |
| Wadakancherry | Ayyappan | Cochin Party |
| Wadakancherry | Menon, Balakrishna | Socialist Party |
| Chittur | Menon, Eachara | Indian National Congress |
| Nemmara | Ezhuthassan, Krishnan | Indian National Congress |

== See also ==
- Travancore-Cochin
- 1951–52 elections in India
- 1952 Madras Legislative Assembly election in Malabar
- 1954 Travancore-Cochin Legislative Assembly election
